= Marion Bartoli career statistics =

Career finals
Discipline	Type	Won	Lost	Total
Singles	Grand Slam	1	1	2
Singles	Summer Olympics	–	–	–
Singles	WTA Finals (Note: Formerly known as: Virginia Slims Championships (until 1995); WTA Tour Championships (until 2014))	–	–	–
Singles	WTA Elite (Note: Elite tier: WTA Tournament of Champions (2009–14); WTA Elite Trophy (2015–present))	0	1	1
Singles	WTA 1000 (Note: Formerly known as: Category 4 & 5 & 6 (until 1990); Tier I (until 2009); WTA Premier Mandatory and 5 (until 2021))	0	1	1
Singles	WTA 500 (Note: Formerly known as: Category 3 (until 1990); Tier II (until 2009); WTA Premier (until 2021))	2	4	6
Singles	WTA 250 (Note: Formerly known as: Category 1 & 2 (until 1990); Tier III & IV & V (until 2009); WTA International (until 2021))	5	4	9
Singles	Total	8	11	19
Doubles	Grand Slam	–	–	–
Doubles	Summer Olympics	–	–	–
Doubles	WTA Finals	–	–	–
Doubles	WTA Elite	–	–	–
Doubles	WTA 1000	–	–	–
Doubles	WTA 500	0	3	3
Doubles	WTA 250	3	1	4
Doubles	Total	3	4	7
Total		11	15	26

This is a list of the main career statistics of retired French tennis player Marion Bartoli. Bartoli reached a career-high singles ranking of No. 7 in the world on 30 January 2012, and won the women's singles title at the 2013 Wimbledon Championships. Overall, Bartoli won eight singles titles and three doubles titles in her career.

== Performance timelines ==
Key
W	F	SF	QF	#R	RR	Q#	DNQ	A	NH

(W) winner; (F) finalist; (SF) semifinalist; (QF) quarterfinalist; (#R) rounds 4, 3, 2, 1; (RR) round-robin stage; (Q#) qualification round; (DNQ) did not qualify; (A) absent; (NH) not held; (SR) strike rate (events won / competed); (W–L) win–loss record.

Only main-draw results in WTA Tour, Grand Slam tournaments, Billie Jean King Cup (Fed Cup), Hopman Cup and Olympic Games are included in win–loss records.

=== Singles ===
Tournament	2001	2002	2003	2004	2005	2006	2007	2008	2009	2010	2011	2012	2013	SR	W–L	Win%
Grand Slam tournaments
Australian Open	A	1R	1R	2R	2R	2R	2R	1R	QF	3R	2R	3R	3R	0 / 12	15–12	56%
French Open	1R	1R	2R	1R	1R	2R	4R	1R	2R	3R	SF	2R	3R	0 / 13	16–13	55%
Wimbledon	A	A	1R	3R	2R	2R	F	3R	3R	4R	QF	2R	W	1 / 11	28–10	74%
US Open	A	3R	1R	2R	3R	3R	4R	4R	2R	2R	2R	QF	A	0 / 11	20–11	65%
Win–loss	0–1	2–3	1–4	4–4	4–4	5–4	13–4	5–4	8–4	7–4	11–4	8–4	11–2	1 / 47	79–46	63%
Year-end championships
WTA Finals	DNQ						RR	DNQ			RR	DNQ		0 / 2	2–1	67%
WTA Elite (WToC)	NH								F	A	1R	A	A	0 / 2	3–2	60%
WTA 1000 + former^{†} tournaments
Dubai / Qatar Open (Note: The first Premier 5 event of the year has switched back and forth between the Dubai Tennis Championships and the Qatar Ladies Open since 2009. Dubai was classified as a Premier 5 event from 2009 to 2011 before being succeeded by Doha for the 2012–2014 period. In 2015, Dubai regained its Premier 5 status while Doha was demoted to Premier status. The Premier 5 tournaments were reclassified as WTA 1000 tournaments in 2021.)	NMS							2R	3R	3R	3R	SF	2R	0 / 6	10–6	63%
Indian Wells Open	A	A	2R	1R	2R	3R	4R	4R	2R	4R	F	QF	4R	0 / 11	18–11	62%
Miami Open	A	A	QF	A	2R	3R	2R	2R	2R	SF	4R	SF	2R	0 / 10	15–10	60%
Madrid Open	NH								1R	2R	2R	1R	3R	0 / 5	4–5	44%
Italian Open	A	A	A	Q2	A	A	A	3R	2R	A	2R	2R	A	0 / 4	3–4	43%
Canadian Open	A	A	2R	A	2R	3R	QF	SF	1R	QF	1R	3R	3R	0 / 10	15–10	60%
Cincinnati Open	NH			NMS					1R	QF	3R	2R	2R	0 / 5	4–5	44%
Pan Pacific Open	A	A	A	A	A	2R	1R	2R	QF	3R	QF	3R	A	0 / 7	11–7	61%
China Open	NMS								SF	1R	3R	SF	A	0 / 4	10–4	71%
Charleston Open^{†}	A	A	1R	A	A	3R	2R	2R	NMS					0 / 4	4–4	50%
German Open^{†}	A	A	Q1	Q2	A	A	A	3R	NH					0 / 1	1–1	50%
Southern California Open^{†}	NMS			3R	1R	1R	3R	NH/NMS						0 / 4	3–4	43%
Kremlin Cup^{†}	A	A	A	A	A	A	2R	1R	NMS					0 / 2	1–2	33%
Zurich Open^{†}	A	A	A	A	A	1R	QF	NH/NMS						0 / 2	2–2	50%
Career statistics
	2001	2002	2003	2004	2005	2006	2007	2008	2009	2010	2011	2012	2013	SR	W–L	Win%
Tournaments	1	3	21	23	25	31	31	26	24	21	29	25	16	Career total: 276		
Titles	0	0	0	0	0	3	0	0	2	0	2	0	1	Career total: 8		
Finals	0	0	0	0	0	4	2	1	4	0	5	2	1	Career total: 19		
Hard win–loss	0–0	2–2	13–11	21–13	18–19	32–17	18–16	20–16	34–14	25–13	38–17	34–17	11–10		266–165	62%
Clay win–loss	0–1	0–1	3–5	3–6	0–1	4–6	14–7	3–6	7–6	3–5	11–7	3–6	4–4		55–61	47%
Grass win–loss	0–0	0–0	1–3	2–2	3–3	3–3	12–3	4–3	5–2	5–2	9–1	4–2	8–0		56–24	70%
Carpet win–loss	0–0	0–0	2–2	0–0	5–2	6–2	3–5	2–1	0–0	1–1	0–0	0–0	0–0		19–13	59%
Overall win–loss	0–1	2–3	19–21	26–21	26–25	45–28	47–31	29–26	46–22	34–21	58–25	41–25	23–14		396–263	60%
Year-end ranking	345	106	57	41	40	17	10	17	11	16	9	11	13	$		

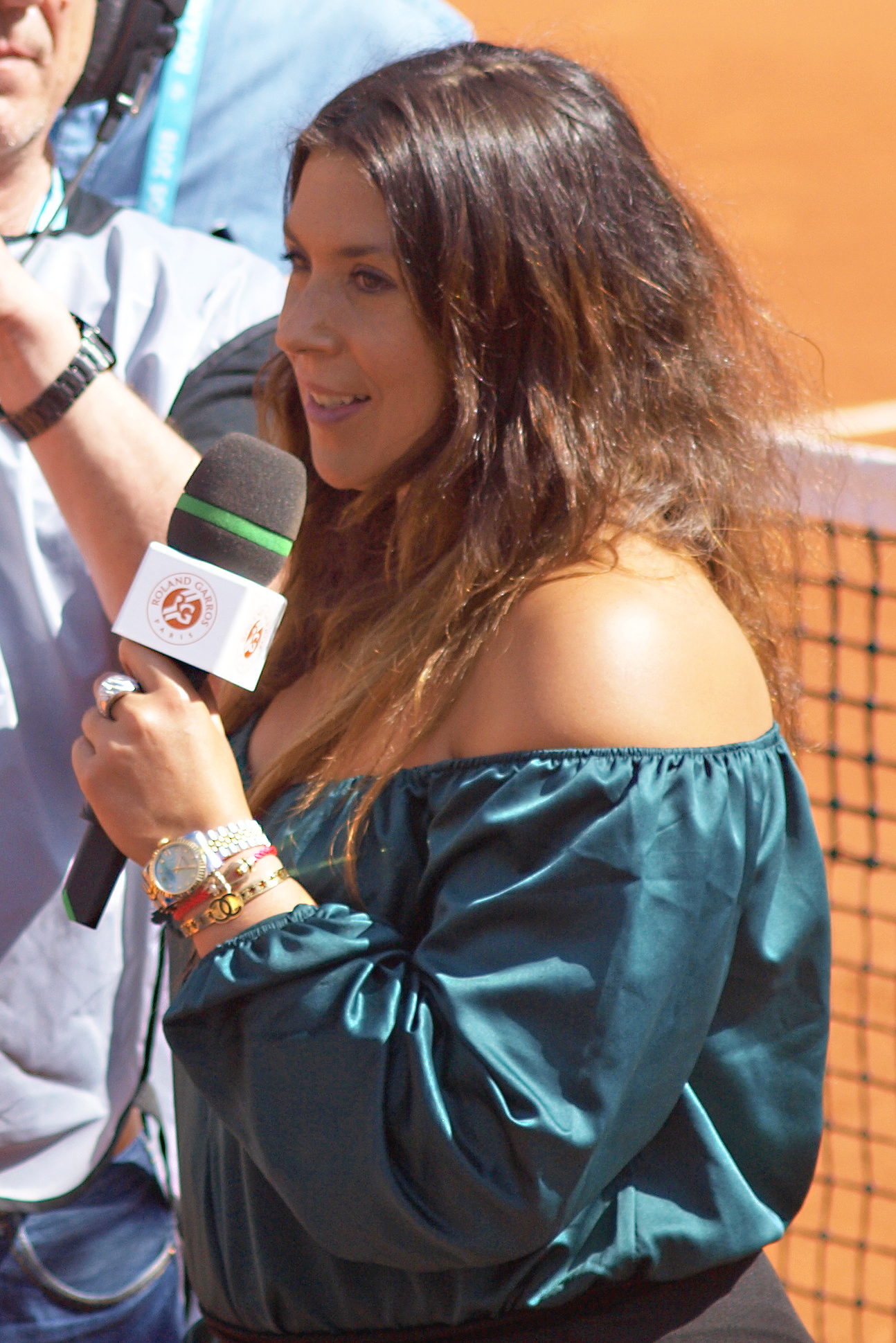
Bartoli as a Sports commentator at the 2018 French Open.

=== Doubles ===
Tournament	2002	2003	2004	2005	2006	2007	SR	W–L	Win%
Grand Slam tournaments
Australian Open	A	2R	3R	3R	A	1R	0 / 4	5–4	56%
French Open	1R	2R	2R	3R	3R	1R	0 / 6	6–6	50%
Wimbledon	A	2R	QF	3R	2R	3R	0 / 5	9–5	64%
US Open	A	SF	1R	1R	2R	A	0 / 4	5–4	56%
Win–loss	0–1	7–4	6–4	6–4	4–3	2–3	0 / 19	25–19	57%

== Grand Slam tournament finals ==
=== Singles: 2 (1 title, 1 runner-up) ===
Result	Year	Championship	Surface	Opponent	Score
Loss	2007	Wimbledon	Grass	(United States) Venus Williams	4–6, 1–6
Win	2013	Wimbledon	Grass	(Germany) Sabine Lisicki	6–1, 6–4

== Other significant finals ==
=== Tournament of Champions ===
==== Singles: 1 (runner-up) ====
Result	Year	Tournament	Surface	Opponent	Score
Loss	2009	WTA Tournament of Champions, Bali	Hard (i)	(France) Aravane Rezaï	5–7, ret.

=== WTA 1000 ===
==== Singles: 1 (runner-up) ====
Result	Year	Tournament	Surface	Opponent	Score
Loss	2011	Indian Wells Open, United States	Hard	(Denmark) Caroline Wozniacki	1–6, 6–2, 3–6

== WTA Tour finals ==
=== Singles: 19 (8 titles, 11 runner-ups) ===
Legend Grand Slam (1–1) Elite (0–1) WTA 1000 (Premier 5) (0–1) WTA 500 (Tier II / Premier) (2–4) WTA 250 (Tier III/Tier IV / International) (5–4)	Finals by surface Hard (5–8) Grass (2–1) Clay (0–2) Carpet (1–0)

Result	W–L	Date	Tournament	Tier	Surface	Opponent	Score
Win	1–0	Jan 2006	Auckland Open, New Zealand	Tier IV	Hard	(Russia) Vera Zvonareva	6–2, 6–2
Loss	1–1	Sep 2006	Bali Open, Indonesia	Tier III	Hard	(Russia) Svetlana Kuznetsova	5–7, 2–6
Win	2–1	Oct 2006	Japan Open, Japan	Tier III	Hard	(Japan) Aiko Nakamura	2–6, 6–2, 6–2
Win	3–1	Oct 2006	Tournoi de Québec, Canada	Tier III	Carpet (i)	(Russia) Olga Puchkova	6–0, 6–0
Loss	3–2	May 2007	Prague Open, Czech Republic	Tier IV	Clay	(Japan) Akiko Morigami	1–6, 3–6
Loss	3–3	Jul 2007	Wimbledon Championships, UK	Grand Slam	Grass	(United States) Venus Williams	4–6, 1–6
Loss	3–4	Jul 2008	Stanford Classic, United States	Tier II	Hard	(Canada) Aleksandra Wozniak	5–7, 3–6
Loss	3–5	Jan 2009	Brisbane International, Australia	International	Hard	(Belarus) Victoria Azarenka	3–6, 1–6
Win	4–5	Mar 2009	Monterrey Open, Mexico	International	Hard	(China) Li Na	6–4, 6–3
Win	5–5	Jul 2009	Stanford Classic, United States	Premier	Hard	(United States) Venus Williams	6–2, 5–7, 6–4
Loss	5–6	Nov 2009	Tournament of Champions, Indonesia	Elite	Hard (i)	(France) Aravane Rezaï	5–7, ret.
Loss	5–7	Mar 2011	Indian Wells Open, U.S.	Premier 5	Hard	(Denmark) Caroline Wozniacki	1–6, 6–2, 3–6
Loss	5–8	May 2011	Internationaux de Strasbourg, France	International	Clay	(Germany) Andrea Petkovic	4–6, 0–1 ret.
Win	6–8	Jun 2011	Eastbourne International, UK	Premier	Grass	(Czech Republic) Petra Kvitová	6–1, 4–6, 7–5
Loss	6–9	Jul 2011	Stanford Classic, United States	Premier	Hard	(United States) Serena Williams	5–7, 1–6
Win	7–9	Oct 2011	Japan Women's Open	International	Hard	(Australia) Samantha Stosur	6–3, 6–1
Loss	7–10	Feb 2012	Paris Indoors, France	Premier	Hard (i)	(Germany) Angelique Kerber	6–7^{(3–7)}, 7–5, 3–6
Loss	7–11	Jul 2012	Southern California Open, United States	Premier	Hard	(Slovakia) Dominika Cibulková	1–6, 5–7
Win	8–11	Jul 2013	Wimbledon Championships, UK	Grand Slam	Grass	(Germany) Sabine Lisicki	6–1, 6–4

=== Doubles: 7 (3 titles, 4 runner-ups) ===
Legend Grand Slam WTA 500 (Tier II) (0–3) WTA 250 (Tier IV / Tier V) (3–1)	Finals by surface Hard (1–3) Clay (2–0) Carpet (0–1)

Result	W–L	Date	Tournament	Tier	Surface	Partner	Opponents	Score
Loss	0–1	Feb 2003	Paris Indoors, France	Tier II	Carpet (i)	(France) Stéphanie Cohen-Aloro	(Austria) Barbara Schett; (Switzerland) Patty Schnyder	6–2, 2–6, 6–7^{(5–7)}
Loss	0–2	Oct 2003	Linz Open, Austria	Tier II	Hard (i)	(Italy) Silvia Farina Elia	(South Africa) Liezel Huber; (Japan) Ai Sugiyama	1–6, 6–7^{(6–8)}
Win	1–2	Apr 2004	Morocco Open, Morocco	Tier V	Clay	(France) Émilie Loit	(Belgium) Els Callens; (Slovenia) Katarina Srebotnik	6–4, 6–2
Loss	1–3	Oct 2004	Tashkent Open, Uzbekistan	Tier IV	Hard	(Italy) Mara Santangelo	(Italy) Adriana Serra Zanetti; (Italy) Antonella Serra Zanetti	6–1, 3–6, 4–6
Win	2–3	Jan 2005	Pattaya Open, Thailand	Tier IV	Hard	(Germany) Anna-Lena Grönefeld	(Poland) Marta Domachowska; (Croatia) Silvija Talaja	6–3, 6–2
Win	3–3	May 2006	Prague Open, Czech Republic	Tier IV	Clay	(Israel) Shahar Pe'er	(United States) Ashley Harkleroad; (United States) Bethanie Mattek	6–4, 6–4
Loss	3–4	Jan 2007	Sydney International, Australia	Tier II	Hard	(United States) Meilen Tu	(Germany) Anna-Lena Grönefeld; (United States) Meghann Shaughnessy	3–6, 6–3, 6–7^{(2–7)}

== ITF Circuit finals ==
=== Singles: 6 titles ===
Legend
$75,000 tournaments
$50,000 tournaments
$25,000 tournaments
$10,000 tournaments

Result	W–L	Date	Tournament	Tier	Surface	Opponent	Score
Win	1–0	May 2001	ITF Hatfield, UK	10,000	Clay	(Japan) Maki Arai	6–0, 6–2
Win	2–0	May 2001	ITF Torino, Italy	10,000	Clay	(France) Stéphanie Rizzi	6–1, 6–1
Win	3–0	Aug 2001	ITF Koksijde, Belgium	10,000	Clay	(Spain) Arantxa Parra Santonja	6–2, 6–1
Win	4–0	Feb 2002	ITF Columbus, United States	25,000	Hard (i)	(Canada) Maureen Drake	6–2, 6–3
Win	5–0	Nov 2002	ITF Poitiers, France	50,000	Hard (i)	(Netherlands) Seda Noorlander	6–1, 6–0
Win	6–0	Dec 2005	Dubai Challenge, U.A.E.	75,000	Hard	(Estonia) Kaia Kanepi	6–2, 6–0

=== Doubles: 2 (1 title, 1 runner-up) ===
Legend
$25,000 tournaments
$10,000 tournaments

Result	W–L	Date	Tournament	Tier	Surface	Partner	Opponents	Score
Loss	0–1	Aug 2000	ITF Koksijde, Belgium	10,000	Clay	(Spain) Carmen Cajo	(Belgium) Leslie Butkiewicz (Czech Republic) Lenka Snajdrová	3–6, 4–6
Loss	1–1	Oct 2002	ITF Cardiff, UK	25,000	Hard (i)	(Canada) Vanessa Webb	(Argentina) Mariana Díaz Oliva (United Kingdom) Julie Pullin	6–4, 6–2

== Best Grand Slam results details ==
Grand Slam winners are in boldface, and runner-ups are in italics.

Australian Open
2009 Australian Open (16th seed)
Round	Opponent	Rank	Score
1R	(United Kingdom) Melanie South	102	6–2, 6–4
2R	(Bulgaria) Tsvetana Pironkova	44	7–5, 6–2
3R	(Czech Republic) Lucie Šafářová	60	3–6, 6–2, 6–1
4R	(Serbia) Jelena Janković (1)	1	6–1, 6–4
QF	(Russia) Vera Zvonareva (7)	7	3–6, 0–6

Wimbledon Championships
2013 Wimbledon (15th seed)
Round	Opponent	Rank	Score
1R	(Ukraine) Elina Svitolina	82	6–3, 7–5
2R	(United States) Christina McHale	70	7–5, 6–4
3R	(Italy) Camila Giorgi	93	6–4, 7–5
4R	(Italy) Karin Knapp	104	6–2, 6–3
QF	(United States) Sloane Stephens (17)	17	6–4, 7–5
SF	(Belgium) Kirsten Flipkens (20)	20	6–1, 6–2
**W**	(Germany) Sabine Lisicki (23)	24	6–1, 6–4

French Open
2011 French Open (11th seed)
Round	Opponent	Rank	Score
1R	(Georgia (country)) Anna Tatishvili	106	1–6, 6–2, 6–1
2R	(Belarus) Olga Govortsova (Q)	123	6–4, 6–7^{(1–7)}, 6–2
3R	(Germany) Julia Görges (17)	18	3–6, 6–2, 6–4
4R	(Argentina) Gisela Dulko	51	7–5, 1–0 ret.
QF	(Russia) Svetlana Kuznetsova (13)	14	7–6^{(7–4)}, 6–4
SF	(Italy) Francesca Schiavone (5)	5	3–6, 3–6

US Open
2012 US Open (11th seed)
Round	Opponent	Rank	Score
1R	(United States) Jamie Hampton	100	6–3, 7–6^{(7–5)}
2R	(Switzerland) Romina Oprandi	56	6–2, 1–6, 7–5
3R	(France) Kristina Mladenovic (WC)	150	6–2, 6–4
4R	(Czech Republic) Petra Kvitová (5)	5	1–6, 6–2, 6–0
QF	(Russia) Maria Sharapova (3)	3	6–3, 3–6, 4–6

== WTA Tour career earnings ==
Bartoli earned more than 11 million dollars during her career.

Year	Grand Slam singles titles	WTA singles titles	Total singles titles	Earnings ($)	Money list rank
2003	0	0	0	274,586	39
2004	0	0	0	227,951	52
2005	0	0	0	290,759	45
2006	0	3	3	436,992	32
2007	0	0	0	1,246,906	9
2008	0	0	0	690,567	22
2009	0	2	2	940,319	14
2010	0	0	0	655,054	30
2011	0	2	2	1,757,863	12
2012	0	0	0	1,551,185	13
2013	1	0	1	2,890,132	7
Career	1	7	8	11,055,114	53

== Record against other players ==
=== No. 1 wins ===
#	Player	Event	Surface	Round	Score	Result
1.	(Belgium) Justine Henin	2007 Wimbledon Championships	Grass	SF	1–6, 7–5, 6–1	F
2.	(Serbia) Jelena Janković	2009 Australian Open	Hard	4R	6–1, 6–4	QF
3.	(Belarus) Victoria Azarenka	2012 Miami Open	Hard	QF	6–3, 6–3	SF

=== Top 10 wins ===
Season	2003	...	2006	2007	2008	2009	2010	2011	2012	2013	Total
Wins	1		3	4	2	4	2	6	2	0	24

#	Player	vsRank	Event	Surface	Round	Score	Rank
2003
1.	(United States) Lindsay Davenport	6	Miami Open, U.S.	Hard	4R	6–0, ret.	87
2006
2.	(Russia) Nadia Petrova	9	Auckland Open, New Zealand	Hard	SF	3–6, 6–4, 2–1 ret.	37
3.	(Russia) Nadia Petrova	7	Connecticut Open, U.S.	Hard	2R	4–6, 6–4, 7–6^{(7–4)}	27
4.	(Switzerland) Patty Schnyder	8	Bali Open, Indonesia	Hard	SF	6–4, 6–4	26
2007
5.	(Serbia) Jelena Janković	3	Wimbledon Championships, UK	Grass	4R	3–6, 7–5, 6–3	19
6.	(Belgium) Justine Henin	1	Wimbledon Championships, UK	Grass	SF	1–6, 7–5, 6–1	19
7.	(Russia) Anna Chakvetadze	5	Luxembourg Open, Luxembourg	Hard (i)	QF	6–4, 4–6, 6–4	11
8.	(Serbia) Jelena Janković	3	Tour Championships, Spain	Hard (i)	RR	6–1, 1–0 ret.	10
2008
9.	(Russia) Anna Chakvetadze	8	Stanford Classic, U.S.	Hard	QF	6–3, 6–4	15
10.	(Russia) Anna Chakvetadze	9	Canadian Open, Canada	Hard	3R	4–6, 7–5, 7–6^{(7–4)}	15
2009
11.	(Serbia) Jelena Janković	1	Australian Open, Australia	Hard	4R	6–1, 6–4	17
12.	(Serbia) Jelena Janković	6	Stanford Classic, U.S.	Hard	QF	3–6, 7–6^{(7–5)}, 6–3	14
13.	(United States) Venus Williams	3	Stanford Classic, U.S.	Hard	F	6–2, 5–7, 6–4	14
14.	(Russia) Vera Zvonareva	7	China Open, China	Hard	QF	3–6, 7–5, 6–2	13
2010
15.	(Russia) Svetlana Kuznetsova	4	Miami Open, U.S.	Hard	4R	6–3, 6–0	15
16.	(Denmark) Caroline Wozniacki	3	Cincinnati Open, U.S.	Hard	3R	6–4, 6–1	20
2011
17.	(Belgium) Kim Clijsters	2	Indian Wells Open, U.S.	Hard	4R	3–6, 3–1 ret.	17
18.	(Belarus) Victoria Azarenka	5	Eastbourne International, UK	Grass	QF	6–2, 2–0 ret.	9
19.	(Australia) Samantha Stosur	10	Eastbourne International, UK	Grass	SF	6–3, 6–1	9
20.	(Czech Republic) Petra Kvitová	8	Eastbourne International, UK	Grass	F	6–1, 4–6, 7–5	9
21.	(Australia) Samantha Stosur	6	Japan Women's Open, Japan	Hard	F	6–3, 6–1	11
22.	(Belarus) Victoria Azarenka	4	Tour Championships, Istanbul	Hard (i)	RR	5–7, 6–4, 6–4	9
2012
23.	(Belarus) Victoria Azarenka	1	Miami Open, U.S.	Hard	QF	6–3, 6–3	7
24.	(Czech Republic) Petra Kvitová	5	US Open, United States	Hard	4R	1–6, 6–2, 6–0	11
