= 2010 Monterrey Open =

- Date: 1–7 March
- Edition: 2nd
- Category: WTA International
- Draw: 32S / 16D
- Prize money: $220,000
- Surface: Hard / outdoor
- Location: Monterrey, Mexico

Champions

Singles
- (Russia) Anastasia Pavlyuchenkova

Doubles
- (Czech Republic) Iveta Benešová / (Czech Republic) Barbora Záhlavová-Strýcová
← 2009 ·	Monterrey Open	· 2011 →

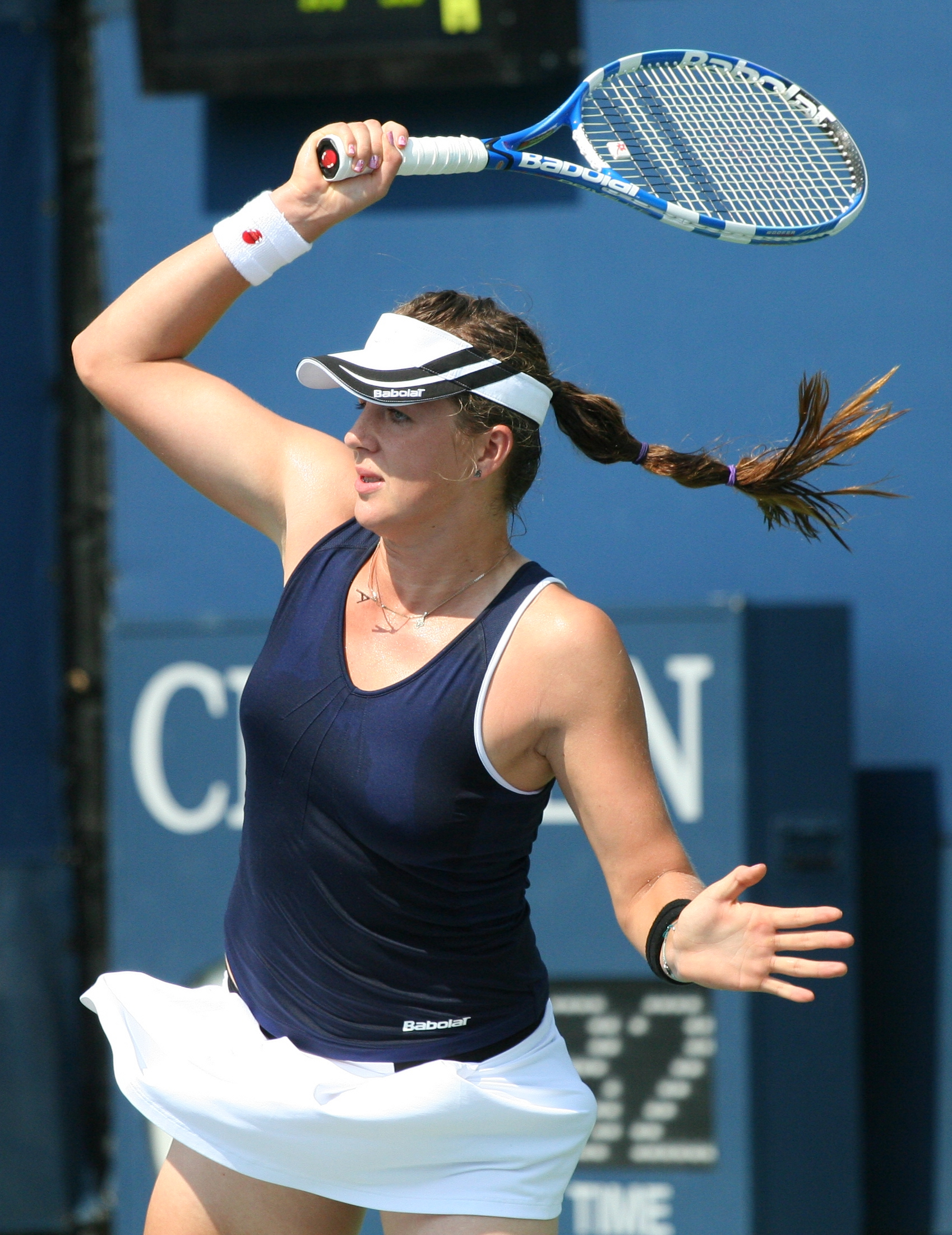
2010 Monterrey Open. Anastasia Pavlyuchenkova

The 2010 Monterrey Open was a tennis tournament played on outdoor hard courts. It was the second edition of the Monterrey Open and was categorized as an International tournament on the 2009 WTA Tour. It took place at the Sierra Madre Tennis Club in Monterrey, Mexico, from March 1 through March 7, 2010.

The tournament was headlined by former world no. 1 Jelena Janković, top-ranked Slovak players, Daniela Hantuchová and Dominika Cibulková, Ágnes Szávay, and Anastasia Pavlyuchenkova. Also in the field were Anabel Medina Garrigues, Aleksandra Wozniak, and 2010 Open GDF Suez finalist Lucie Šafářová.

== Finals ==
=== Singles ===
(Russia) Anastasia Pavlyuchenkova defeated (Slovakia) Daniela Hantuchová, 1–6, 6–1, 6–0

- It was Pavlyuchenkova's first career singles title.

=== Doubles ===
(Czech Republic) Iveta Benešová / (Czech Republic) Barbora Záhlavová-Strýcová defeated (Germany) Anna-Lena Grönefeld / (United States) Vania King, 3–6, 6–4, [10–8]

== Entrants ==
=== Seeds ===
Athlete	Nationality	Ranking*	Seeding
Jelena Janković	Serbia	9	1
Daniela Hantuchová	Slovakia	24	2
Anastasia Pavlyuchenkova	Russia	27	3
Dominika Cibulková	Slovakia	28	4
Ágnes Szávay	Hungary	31	5
Anabel Medina Garrigues	Spain	34	6
Aleksandra Wozniak	Canada	35	7
Lucie Šafářová	Czech Republic	38	8

- Rankings and seedings are as of February 22, The seedings can change.

=== Other entrants ===
The following players received wildcards into the main draw:

- (Slovakia) Dominika Cibulková
- (Slovakia) Daniela Hantuchová
- (Serbia) Jelena Janković

The following players received entry via qualifying:

- (Italy) Corinna Dentoni
- (Spain) Lourdes Domínguez Lino
- (Ukraine) Olga Savchuk
- (Georgia (country)) Anna Tatishvili
