= 2011 Monterrey Open =

- Date: February 28 – March 6
- Edition: 3rd
- Category: WTA International
- Draw: 32S / 16D
- Prize money: $220,000
- Surface: Hard / outdoor
- Location: Monterrey, Mexico
- Venue: Sierra Madre Tennis Club

Champions

Singles
- (Russia) Anastasia Pavlyuchenkova

Doubles
- (Czech Republic) Iveta Benešová (Czech Republic) Barbora Záhlavová-Strýcová
← 2010 ·	Monterrey Open	· 2012 →

The 2011 Monterrey Open was a women's tennis tournament played on outdoor hard courts. It was the third edition of the Monterrey Open and was categorized as an International tournament on the 2011 WTA Tour. It took place at the Sierra Madre Tennis Club in Monterrey, Mexico, from February 28 through March 6, 2011. Second-seeded Anastasia Pavlyuchenkova won the singles title.

== Finals ==
=== Singles ===
(Russia) Anastasia Pavlyuchenkova defeated (Serbia) Jelena Janković, 2–6, 6–2, 6–3

- It was Pavlyuchenkova's 1st title of the year and 3rd of her career. She defended her title.

=== Doubles ===
(Czech Republic) Iveta Benešová / (Czech Republic) Barbora Záhlavová-Strýcová defeated (Germany) Anna-Lena Grönefeld / (United States) Vania King, 6–7^{(8–10)}, 6–2, [10–6]

== Entrants ==
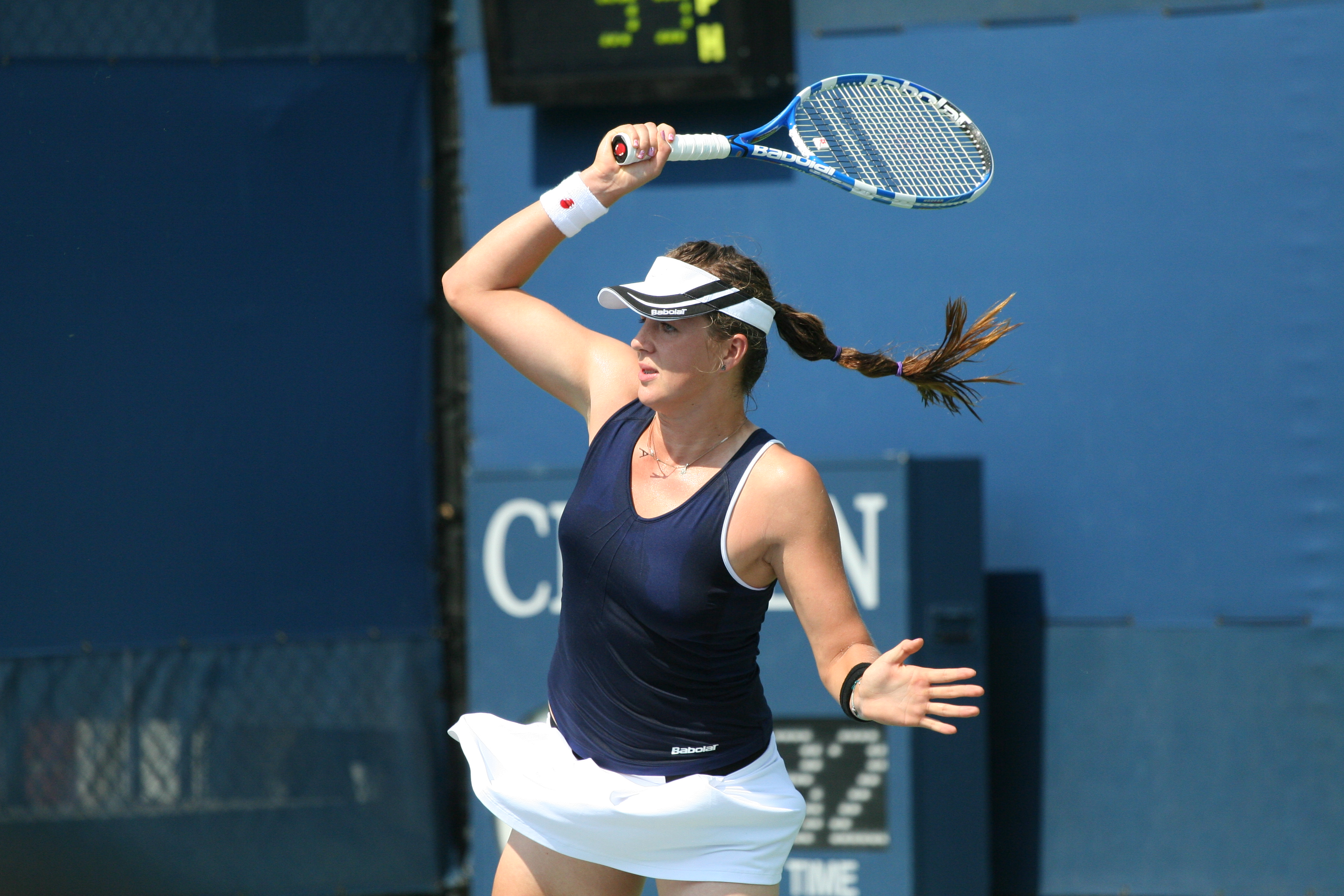
Anastasia Pavlyuchenkova at the 2010 US Open

=== Seeds ===
Country	Player	Rank*	Seed
SRB	Jelena Janković	6	1
RUS	Anastasia Pavlyuchenkova	19	2
FRA	Aravane Rezaï	23	3
GER	Julia Görges	34	4
LAT	Anastasija Sevastova	37	5
ITA	Sara Errani	41	6
CZE	Iveta Benešová	47	7
SVN	Polona Hercog	50	8

- Rankings and seedings are as of February 21, 2011.
- Seeding are subject to change.

=== Other entrants ===
The following players received wildcards into the main draw:

- (Mexico) Ximena Hermoso
- (Russia) Anastasia Pavlyuchenkova
- (France) Aravane Rezaï

The following players received entry via qualifying:

- (Greece) Eleni Daniilidou
- (Czech Republic) Lucie Hradecká
- (Spain) Laura Pous Tió
- (Canada) Aleksandra Wozniak
