= 2010 Monterrey Open – Singles =

Singles
- 2010 Monterrey Open

Final
- Champion: (Russia) Anastasia Pavlyuchenkova
- Runner-up: (Slovakia) Daniela Hantuchová
- Score: 1–6, 6–1, 6–0.

Details
- Draw: 32
- Seeds: 8

Events
Singles	Doubles
- Monterrey Open

Marion Bartoli was the defending champion; however, she didn't take part in these championships this year.
Anastasia Pavlyuchenkova won her first WTA singles title, defeating Daniela Hantuchová in the final 1–6, 6–1, 6–0.

== Seeds ==
1. (Serbia) Jelena Janković (first round)
2. (Slovakia) Daniela Hantuchová (final)
3. (Russia) Anastasia Pavlyuchenkova (champion)
4. (Slovakia) Dominika Cibulková (semifinals)
5. (Hungary) Ágnes Szávay (quarterfinals)
6. (Spain) Anabel Medina Garrigues (first round)
7. (Canada) Aleksandra Wozniak (second round)
8. (Czech Republic) Lucie Šafářová (first round)

== Draw ==
Key

- Q = Qualifier
- WC = Wild card
- LL = Lucky loser
- Alt = Alternate
- ITF = ITF entry
- PR = Protected ranking
- SR = Special ranking
- SE = Special exempt
- JE = Junior exempt
- JR = Junior Accelerator Programme entrant
- CO = College Accelerator Programme entrant
- NG = Next Gen Accelerator Program entrant
- w/o = Walkover
- r = Retired
- d = Defaulted

=== Finals ===
Semifinals
(Latvia) Anastasija Sevastova	3	6	1
3	(Russia) Anastasia Pavlyuchenkova	6	2	6
4/WC	(Slovakia) Dominika Cibulková	6	3	0
2/WC	(Slovakia) Daniela Hantuchová	4	6	6

Final
3	(Russia) Anastasia Pavlyuchenkova	1	6	6
2/WC	(Slovakia) Daniela Hantuchová	6	1	0

=== Top half ===
First round
1/WC	(Serbia) J Janković	7	4	4
(Latvia) A Sevastova	5	6	6
(United States) J Craybas	6	2	1
(Czech Republic) I Benešová	3	6	6
(France) A Cornet	6	6
(Czech Republic) B Záhlavová-Strýcová	3	1
(United States) L Granville	3	r
7	(Canada) A Wozniak	3
3	(Russia) A Pavlyuchenkova	6	6
Q	(Georgia (country)) A Tatishvili	1	2
(Slovenia) P Hercog	6	6
Q	(Italy) C Dentoni	2	4
Q	(Ukraine) O Savchuk	6^{5}	0
(Austria) P Mayr	7	6
(Czech Republic) K Zakopalová	7	7
6	(Spain) A Medina Garrigues	5	5

Second round
(Latvia) A Sevastova	6	6
(Czech Republic) I Benešová	1	2
(France) A Cornet	6	6
7	(Canada) A Wozniak	2	3
3	(Russia) A Pavlyuchenkova	6	6
(Slovenia) P Hercog	2	3
(Austria) P Mayr	4	3
(Czech Republic) K Zakopalová	6	6

Quarterfinals
(Latvia) A Sevastova	2	7	6
(France) A Cornet	6	5	1
3	(Russia) A Pavlyuchenkova	6	6
(Czech Republic) K Zakopalová	2	2

Semifinals
(Latvia) A Sevastova	3	6	1
3	(Russia) A Pavlyuchenkova	6	2	6

=== Bottom half ===
First round
5	(Hungary) Á Szávay	6	3	6
(Germany) J Görges	3	6	3
(Czech Republic) L Hradecká	2	0
(Germany) A-L Grönefeld	6	6
(Italy) S Errani	6	6
(Romania) S Cîrstea	2	3
(Italy) R Vinci	4	3
4/WC	(Slovakia) D Cibulková	6	6
8	(Czech Republic) L Šafářová	7	4	4
(France) J Coin	5	6	6
(United States) V King	4	7	6
(Czech Republic) S Záhlavová	6	5	3
(Spain) A Parra Santonja	6^{5}	4
(Estonia) K Kanepi	7	6
Q	(Spain) L Domínguez Lino	3	6^{6}
2/WC	(Slovakia) D Hantuchová	6	7

Second round
5	(Hungary) Á Szávay	6	6^{4}	6
(Germany) A-L Grönefeld	1	7	1
(Italy) S Errani	6	4	1
4/WC	(Slovakia) D Cibulková	3	6	6
(France) J Coin	3	3
(United States) V King	6	6
(Estonia) K Kanepi	1	3
2/WC	(Slovakia) D Hantuchová	6	6

Quarterfinals
5	(Hungary) Á Szávay	6	3	3
4/WC	(Slovakia) D Cibulková	3	6	6
(United States) V King	6	2	1
2/WC	(Slovakia) D Hantuchová	2	6	6

Semifinals
4/WC	(Slovakia) D Cibulková	6	3	0
2/WC	(Slovakia) D Hantuchová	4	6	6
