= 2011 Monterrey Open – Singles =

Singles
- 2011 Monterrey Open

Final
- Champion: (Russia) Anastasia Pavlyuchenkova
- Runner-up: (Serbia) Jelena Janković
- Score: 2–6, 6–2, 6–3

Details
- Draw: 32
- Seeds: 8

Events
Singles	Doubles
- Monterrey Open

Anastasia Pavlyuchenkova was the reigning champion and defended her title by defeating Jelena Janković 2–6, 6–2, 6–3 in the final.

== Seeds ==
1. (Serbia) Jelena Janković (final)
2. (Russia) Anastasia Pavlyuchenkova (champion)
3. (France) Aravane Rezaï (first round)
4. (Germany) Julia Görges (first round)
5. (Latvia) Anastasija Sevastova (quarterfinals)
6. (Italy) Sara Errani (second round)
7. (Czech Republic) Iveta Benešová (first round)
8. (Slovenia) Polona Hercog (semifinals)

== Draw ==
Key

- Q = Qualifier
- WC = Wild card
- LL = Lucky loser
- Alt = Alternate
- ITF = ITF entry
- PR = Protected ranking
- SR = Special ranking
- SE = Special exempt
- JE = Junior exempt
- JR = Junior Accelerator Programme entrant
- CO = College Accelerator Programme entrant
- NG = Next Gen Accelerator Program entrant
- w/o = Walkover
- r = Retired
- d = Defaulted

=== Finals ===
Semifinals
1	(Serbia) Jelena Janković	6	6
8	(Slovenia) Polona Hercog	3	2
(Argentina) Gisela Dulko	4	1
2/WC	(Russia) Anastasia Pavlyuchenkova	6	6

Final
1	(Serbia) Jelena Janković	6	2	3
2/WC	(Russia) Anastasia Pavlyuchenkova	2	6	6

=== Top half ===
First round
1	(Serbia) J Janković	6	6
(Spain) L Domínguez Lino	4	1
(Czech Republic) A Hlaváčková	6	3	3
(Austria) S Bammer	4	6	6
(Romania) S Halep	5	1
(France) A Cornet	7	6
Q	(Spain) L Pous Tió	2	4
5	(Latvia) A Sevastova	6	6
3/WC	(France) A Rezaï	2	1
(Russia) A Kudryavtseva	6	6
(Belarus) O Govortsova	6	6
(Czech Republic) R Voráčová	3	1
(Italy) R Oprandi	0	6	1
(Czech Republic) B Záhlavová-Strýcová	6	4	6
(Germany) A Kerber	3	3
8	(Slovenia) P Hercog	6	6

Second round
1	(Serbia) J Janković	6	6
(Austria) S Bammer	3	4
(France) A Cornet	6	2	4
5	(Latvia) A Sevastova	2	6	6
(Russia) A Kudryavtseva	3	6	0
(Belarus) O Govortsova	6	4	6
(Czech Republic) B Záhlavová-Strýcová	4	7	2
8	(Slovenia) P Hercog	6	6^{4}	6

Quarterfinals
1	(Serbia) J Janković	6	7
5	(Latvia) A Sevastova	1	5
(Belarus) O Govortsova	6	3	3
8	(Slovenia) P Hercog	4	6	6

Semifinals
1	(Serbia) J Janković	6	6
8	(Slovenia) P Hercog	3	2

=== Bottom half ===
First round
7	(Czech Republic) I Benešová	2	6^{3}
(Argentina) G Dulko	6	7
Q	(Canada) A Wozniak	6	6
WC	(Mexico) X Hermoso	2	0
Q	(Czech Republic) L Hradecká	6	6
(Czech Republic) Z Ondrášková	2	2
(Russia) K Pervak	6	7
4	(Germany) J Görges	1	5
6	(Italy) S Errani	6	6
(Sweden) J Larsson	2	4
(Hungary) G Arn	6	6
(Czech Republic) S Záhlavová	0	4
(United States) V King	4	1
(United States) M Oudin	6	6
Q	(Greece) E Daniilidou	2	7	4
2/WC	(Russia) A Pavlyuchenkova	6	6^{5}	6

Second round
(Argentina) G Dulko	6	6
Q	(Canada) A Wozniak	4	1
Q	(Czech Republic) L Hradecká	2	7	3
(Russia) K Pervak	6	6^{4}	6
6	(Italy) S Errani	6	5	4
(Hungary) G Arn	4	7	6
(United States) M Oudin	2	6^{6}
2/WC	(Russia) A Pavlyuchenkova	6	7

Quarterfinals
(Argentina) G Dulko	6	6
(Russia) K Pervak	1	0
(Hungary) G Arn	2	6^{3}
2/WC	(Russia) A Pavlyuchenkova	6	7

Semifinals
(Argentina) G Dulko	4	1
2/WC	(Russia) A Pavlyuchenkova	6	6
