= 2009 Monterrey Open =

- Date: 2–8 March
- Edition: 1st
- Category: WTA International
- Draw: 32S / 16D
- Prize money: $220,000
- Surface: Hard / outdoor
- Location: Monterrey, Mexico

Champions

Singles
- (France) Marion Bartoli

Doubles
- (France) Nathalie Dechy / (Italy) Mara Santangelo
- Monterrey Open

The 2009 Monterrey Open was a women's tennis tournament played on outdoor hard courts. It was the first edition of the Monterrey Open and was categorized as an International tournament on the 2009 WTA Tour. It took place at the Sierra Madre Tennis Club in Monterrey, Mexico, from 2 March through 8 March 2009.

The tournament included four players who were ranked in the top 20: Agnieszka Radwańska; Marion Bartoli, the 2009 Brisbane runner-up; Flavia Pennetta, the 2009 Acapulco runner-up; and Zheng Jie. Also in the field were Ágnes Szávay; Iveta Benešová, the 2009 Hobart runner-up and a 2009 Acapulco semifinalist; Gisela Dulko, the 2009 Bogotá runner-up; and Maria Kirilenko.

Second-seeded Marion Bartoli won the singles title.

== Finals ==
=== Singles ===
(France) Marion Bartoli defeated (China) Li Na 6–4, 6–3

- It was Bartoli's 1st singles title of the year and the 4th of her career.

=== Doubles ===
(France) Nathalie Dechy / (Italy) Mara Santangelo defeated (Czech Republic) Iveta Benešová / (Czech Republic) Barbora Záhlavová-Strýcová 6–3, 6–4

== Entrants ==
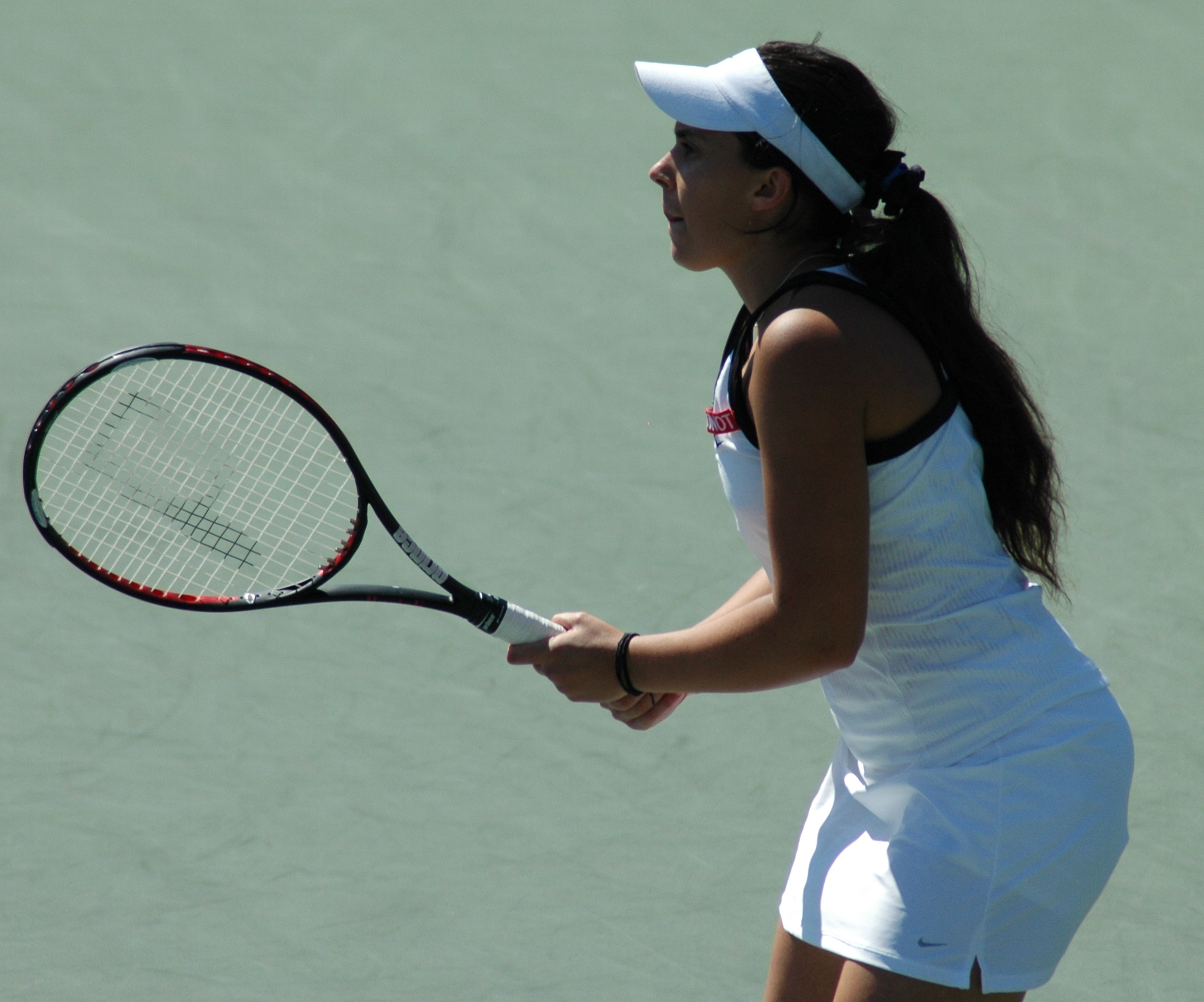

=== Seeds ===
Athlete	Nationality	Ranking*	Seeding
Agnieszka Radwańska	Poland	10	1
Marion Bartoli	France	13	2
Flavia Pennetta	Italy	15	3
Zheng Jie	China	18	4
Ágnes Szávay	Hungary	27	5
Iveta Benešová	Czech Republic	31	6
Gisela Dulko	Argentina	36	7
Maria Kirilenko	Russia	38	8

- Rankings as of March 2, 2009.

=== Other entrants ===
The following players received wildcards into the main draw:

- Melissa Torres Sandoval
- Urszula Radwańska
- Magdaléna Rybáriková

The following players received entry via qualifying:

- Lenka Wienerová
- Michaëlla Krajicek
- Vania King
- Arantxa Rus
