= 2026 Monterrey Open – Singles =

Singles
- 2026 Monterrey Open

Final
- Champion: (France) Diane Parry
- Runner-up: (Belgium) Elise Mertens
- Score: 6–4, 0–6, 6–3
- Date: 29 August 2026

Details
- Draw: 28
- Seeds: 8

Events
Singles	Doubles
- Monterrey Open

Diane Parry defeated Elise Mertens in the final, 6–4, 0–6, 6–3 to win the singles tennis title at the 2026 Monterrey Open. It was her first WTA Tour singles title. Parry was the first Frenchwoman to win Monterrey since Marion Bartoli won the inaugural edition in 2009.

Diana Shnaider was the reigning champion, but did not participate this year.

== Seeds ==
The top four seeds received a bye into the second round.

1. Ekaterina Alexandrova (second round)
2. (Belgium) Elise Mertens (final)
3. (Poland) Maja Chwalińska (second round)
4. (Austria) Anastasia Potapova (withdrew)
5. (United States) Ann Li (semifinals)
6. (Croatia) Donna Vekić (first round)
7. (Indonesia) Janice Tjen (second round)
8. (Spain) Cristina Bucșa (second round)

== Draw ==
Key

- Q = Qualifier
- WC = Wild card
- LL = Lucky loser
- Alt = Alternate
- ITF = ITF entry
- PR = Protected ranking
- SR = Special ranking
- SE = Special exempt
- JE = Junior exempt
- JR = Junior Accelerator Programme entrant
- CO = College Accelerator Programme entrant
- NG = Next Gen Accelerator Program entrant
- w/o = Walkover
- r = Retired
- d = Defaulted

=== Finals ===
Semifinals
(France) Diane Parry	7^{9}	6
5	(United States) Ann Li	6^{7}	4
(Czech Republic) Nikola Bartůňková	6	4	2
2	(Belgium) Elise Mertens	1	6	6

Final
(France) Diane Parry	6	0	6
2	(Belgium) Elise Mertens	4	6	3

=== Top half ===
First round
(Denmark) C Tauson	3	6	6
WC	(Mexico) R Zarazúa	6	3	0
(Egypt) M Sherif	3	4
(Ukraine) O Oliynykova	6	6
(France) D Parry	6^{5}	6	6
6	(Croatia) D Vekić	7^{7}	4	1
WC	(United States) A Parks	2	6	6
(Croatia) P Marčinko	6	4	4
(China) S Zhang	1	3
Q	(Uzbekistan) M Timofeeva	6	6
(Colombia) C Osorio	1	2
5	(United States) A Li	6	6

Second round
1	E Alexandrova	6^{6}	6	3
(Denmark) C Tauson	7^{8}	4	6
(Ukraine) O Oliynykova	4	6^{3}
(France) D Parry	6	7^{7}
3	(Poland) M Chwalińska	6	2	2
WC	(United States) A Parks	3	6	6
Q	(Uzbekistan) M Timofeeva
5	(United States) A Li	w/o

Quarterfinals
(Denmark) C Tauson	3	5
(France) D Parry	6	7
WC	(United States) A Parks	2	3
5	(United States) A Li	6	6

Semifinals
(France) D Parry	7^{9}	6
5	(United States) A Li	6^{7}	4

=== Bottom half ===
First round
8	(Spain) C Bucșa	6	6
Q	(Hungary) A Bondár	4	3
Q	(Czech Republic) D Vidmanova	7^{7}	6
(Australia) K Birrell	6^{2}	3
(Croatia) A Ružić	4	3
(Czech Republic) N Bartůňková	6	6
7	(Indonesia) J Tjen	2	6	7^{7}
WC	(Ukraine) D Yastremska	6	3	6^{5}
(Austria) L Tagger	3	4
(Ukraine) Y Starodubtseva	6	6
LL	(Hungary) P Udvardy	7^{7}	6
Q	(Australia) M Joint	6^{5}	1

Second round
8	(Spain) C Bucșa	4	5
Q	(Czech Republic) D Vidmanova	6	7
(Czech Republic) N Bartůňková	6^{4}	7	6
LL	(Chinese Taipei) E-s Liang	7^{7}	5	4
7	(Indonesia) J Tjen	4	3
(Ukraine) Y Starodubtseva	6	6
LL	(Hungary) P Udvardy	1	6	3
2	(Belgium) E Mertens	6	4	6

Quarterfinals
Q	(Czech Republic) D Vidmanova	4	7^{7}	3
(Czech Republic) N Bartůňková	6	6^{3}	6
(Ukraine) Y Starodubtseva	1	4
2	(Belgium) E Mertens	6	6

Semifinals
(Czech Republic) N Bartůňková	6	4	2
2	(Belgium) E Mertens	1	6	6

== Qualifying ==
=== Seeds ===
1. (Australia) Maya Joint (qualified)
2. (Hungary) Anna Bondár (qualified)
3. (Hungary) Panna Udvardy (qualifying competition, lucky loser)
4. (Thailand) Lanlana Tararudee (first round)
5. (Kazakhstan) Yulia Putintseva (qualifying competition)
6. (Uzbekistan) Kamilla Rakhimova (qualifying competition)
7. (Austria) Sinja Kraus (first round)
8. (Czech Republic) Darja Vidmanova (qualified)

=== Qualifiers ===
1. (Australia) Maya Joint
2. (Hungary) Anna Bondár
3. (Czech Republic) Darja Vidmanova
4. (Uzbekistan) Maria Timofeeva

=== Lucky losers ===
1. (Hungary) Panna Udvardy
2. (Chinese Taipei) Liang En-shuo

=== Qualifying draw ===
==== First qualifier ====
First round
1	(Australia) Maya Joint	6	6
WC	(Mexico) Jéssica Hinojosa Gómez	4	2
(Mexico) Victoria Rodríguez	4	3
5	(Kazakhstan) Yulia Putintseva	6	6

Qualifying competition
1	(Australia) Maya Joint	0	6	6
5	(Kazakhstan) Yulia Putintseva	6	3	1

==== Second qualifier ====
First round
2	(Hungary) Anna Bondár	6	6
(France) Elsa Jacquemot	3	3
(Chinese Taipei) Liang En-shuo	7	5	6
7	(Austria) Sinja Kraus	5	7	4

Qualifying competition
2	(Hungary) Anna Bondár	6	4	6
(Chinese Taipei) Liang En-shuo	3	6	1

==== Third qualifier ====
First round
3	(Hungary) Panna Udvardy	6	1	7^{7}
(Colombia) Emiliana Arango	3	6	6^{5}
(Germany) Caroline Werner	5	4
8	(Czech Republic) Darja Vidmanova	7	6

Qualifying competition
3	(Hungary) Panna Udvardy	3	6	3
8	(Czech Republic) Darja Vidmanova	6	3	6

==== Fourth qualifier ====
First round
4	(Thailand) Lanlana Tararudee	6^{5}	6	6^{4}
(Uzbekistan) Maria Timofeeva	7^{7}	2	7^{7}
(France) Léolia Jeanjean	4	6	2
6	(Uzbekistan) Kamilla Rakhimova	6	4	6

Qualifying competition
(Uzbekistan) Maria Timofeeva	3	6	7^{7}
6	(Uzbekistan) Kamilla Rakhimova	6	3	6^{1}
