= 2010 Monterrey Open – Doubles =

Doubles
- 2010 Monterrey Open

Final
- Champion: (Czech Republic) Iveta Benešová (Czech Republic) Barbora Záhlavová-Strýcová
- Runner-up: (Germany) Anna-Lena Grönefeld (United States) Vania King
- Score: 3–6, 6–4, [10–8]

Details
- Draw: 16
- Seeds: 4

Events
Singles	Doubles
← 2009 ·	Monterrey Open	· 2011 →

Nathalie Dechy and Mara Santangelo won the tournament in 2009, but Dechy retired from tennis later in the year and Santangelo chose to not participate this year.
Iveta Benešová and Barbora Záhlavová-Strýcová won in the final 3–6, 6–4, [10–8] against Anna-Lena Grönefeld and Vania King.

== Seeds ==
1. (Germany) Anna-Lena Grönefeld / (United States) Vania King (final)
2. (Czech Republic) Iveta Benešová / (Czech Republic) Barbora Záhlavová-Strýcová (champions)
3. (Czech Republic) Andrea Hlaváčková / (Czech Republic) Lucie Hradecká (first round)
4. (Czech Republic) Vladimíra Uhlířová / (Czech Republic) Renata Voráčová (first round)

== Draw ==
=== Key ===
- Q = Qualifier
- WC = Wild card
- LL = Lucky loser
- Alt = Alternate
- SE = Special exempt
- PR = Protected ranking
- ITF = ITF entry
- JE = Junior exempt
- w/o = Walkover
- r = Retired
- d = Defaulted
- SR = Special ranking

=== Draw ===
First round
1	(Germany) A-L Grönefeld (United States) V King	6	6
(United States) C Gullickson (Netherlands) M Krajicek	1	2
(Russia) M Kondratieva (France) S Lefèvre	1	3
(Russia) A Pavlyuchenkova (Czech Republic) K Zakopalová	6	6
4	(Czech Republic) V Uhlířová (Czech Republic) R Voráčová	4	2
(Italy) S Errani (Italy) R Vinci	6	6
(United States) J Craybas (Germany) J Görges	6	6
WC	(Brazil) MF Alves (Mexico) D Múñoz Gallegos	1	1
WC	(France) A Védy (United States) M Washington	4	4
(France) J Coin (Canada) M-È Pelletier	6	6
(Spain) L Domínguez Lino (Spain) A Parra Santonja	5	6	[10]
3	(Czech Republic) A Hlaváčková (Czech Republic) L Hradecká	7	2	[5]
ALT	(Russia) N Bratchikova (Germany) K Wörle	3	7	[10]
(Spain) A Medina Garrigues (United States) M Shaughnessy	6	6^{5}	[12]
(Ukraine) O Savchuk (United States) R Zalameda	4	6^{5}
2	(Czech Republic) I Benešová (Czech Republic) B Záhlavová-Strýcová	6	7

Quarterfinals
1	(Germany) A-L Grönefeld (United States) V King	4	6	[10]
(Russia) A Pavlyuchenkova (Czech Republic) K Zakopalová	6	3	[5]
(Italy) S Errani (Italy) R Vinci	6^{3}	6	[10]
(United States) J Craybas (Germany) J Görges	7	3	[4]
(France) J Coin (Canada) M-È Pelletier	7	7
(Spain) L Domínguez Lino (Spain) A Parra Santonja	6^{0}	5
(Spain) A Medina Garrigues (United States) M Shaughnessy	2	6^{3}
2	(Czech Republic) I Benešová (Czech Republic) B Záhlavová-Strýcová	6	7

Semifinals
1	(Germany) A-L Grönefeld (United States) V King	6	6	[10]
(Italy) S Errani (Italy) R Vinci	7	3	[6]
(France) J Coin (Canada) M-È Pelletier	5	5
2	(Czech Republic) I Benešová (Czech Republic) B Záhlavová-Strýcová	7	7

Finals
1	(Germany) A-L Grönefeld (United States) V King	6	4	[8]
2	(Czech Republic) I Benešová (Czech Republic) B Záhlavová-Strýcová	3	6	[10]
