= 2026 Monterrey Open =

- Date: 23–29 August
- Edition: 18th
- Category: WTA 500
- Draw: 28S / 16D
- Surface: Hard
- Location: Monterrey, Mexico
- Venue: Club Sonoma

Champions

Singles
- (France) Diane Parry

Doubles
- (Australia) Maya Joint / (China) Xu Yifan
- Monterrey Open

The 2026 Monterrey Open (also known as the Abierto GNP Seguros for sponsorship reasons) was a women's tennis tournament played on outdoor hard courts. It was the 18th edition of the Monterrey Open and a WTA 500 tournament on the 2026 WTA Tour. It took place at the Club Sonoma in Monterrey, Mexico, from 23 to 29 August 2026.

== Champions ==
=== Singles ===
- (France) Diane Parry def. (Belgium) Elise Mertens, 6–4, 0–6, 6–3

=== Doubles ===
- (Australia) Maya Joint / (China) Xu Yifan def. Maria Kozyreva / (United Kingdom) Maia Lumsden, 6–2, 4–6, [10–5]

== Singles main draw entrants ==
=== Seeds ===
Country	Player	Ranking^{1}	Seed
	Ekaterina Alexandrova	18	1
BEL	Elise Mertens	22	2
POL	Maja Chwalińska	23	3
~~AUT~~	~~Anastasia Potapova~~	~~25~~	~~4~~
USA	Ann Li	29	5
CRO	Donna Vekić	34	6
INA	Janice Tjen	37	7
ESP	Cristina Bucșa	38	8

- ^{1} Rankings as of 10 August 2026.

=== Other entrants ===
The following players received wildcards into the main draw:

- (United States) Alycia Parks
- (Ukraine) Dayana Yastremska
- (Mexico) Renata Zarazúa

The following players received entry from the qualifying draw:

- (Hungary) Anna Bondár
- (Australia) Maya Joint
- (Uzbekistan) Maria Timofeeva
- (Czech Republic) Darja Vidmanova

The following players received entry as lucky losers:

- (Chinese Taipei) Liang En-shuo
- (Hungary) Panna Udvardy

=== Withdrawals ===
- (Czech Republic) Sára Bejlek → replaced by (Hungary) Panna Udvardy
- (Romania) Sorana Cîrstea → replaced by (France) Diane Parry
- (Poland) Magdalena Fręch → replaced by (Colombia) Camila Osorio
- (Czech Republic) Linda Nosková → replaced by (China) Zhang Shuai
- (Austria) Anastasia Potapova → replaced by (Chinese Taipei) Liang En-shuo
- (Turkey) Zeynep Sönmez → replaced by (Ukraine) Yuliia Starodubtseva

== Doubles main draw entrants ==
=== Seeds ===
Country	Player	Country	Player	Rank^{1}	Seed
ESP	Cristina Bucșa	USA	Nicole Melichar-Martinez	27	1
CHN	Jiang Xinyu	CHN	Zhang Shuai	37	2
AUS	Ellen Perez	NED	Demi Schuurs	42	3
KAZ	Anna Danilina	JPN	Miyu Kato	47	4

- Rankings as of 10 August 2026.

=== Other entrants ===
The following pair received a wildcard into the doubles main draw:

- (China) Tang Qianhui / (Mexico) Renata Zarazúa
