= 2026 Monterrey Open – Doubles =

Doubles
- 2026 Monterrey Open

Final
- Champions: (Australia) Maya Joint (China) Xu Yifan
- Runners-up: Maria Kozyreva (United Kingdom) Maia Lumsden
- Score: 6–2, 4–6, [10–5]
- Date: 29 August 2026

Details
- Draw: 16
- Seeds: 4

Events
Singles	Doubles
- Monterrey Open

Maya Joint and Xu Yifan defeated Maria Kozyreva and Maia Lumsden in the final, 6–2, 4–6, [10–5] to win the doubles tennis title at the 2026 Monterrey Open.

Cristina Bucșa and Nicole Melichar-Martinez were the defending champions, but lost in the first round to Ulrikke Eikeri and Quinn Gleason.

== Seeds ==
1. (Spain) Cristina Bucșa / (United States) Nicole Melichar-Martinez (first round)
2. (China) Jiang Xinyu / (China) Zhang Shuai (first round)
3. (Australia) Ellen Perez / (Netherlands) Demi Schuurs (first round)
4. (Kazakhstan) Anna Danilina / (Japan) Miyu Kato (quarterfinals)

== Draw ==
Key

- Q = Qualifier
- WC = Wild card
- LL = Lucky loser
- Alt = Alternate
- ITF = ITF entry
- PR = Protected ranking
- SR = Special ranking
- SE = Special exempt
- JE = Junior exempt
- JR = Junior Accelerator Programme entrant
- CO = College Accelerator Programme entrant
- NG = Next Gen Accelerator Program entrant
- w/o = Walkover
- r = Retired
- d = Defaulted

First round
1	(Spain) C Bucșa (United States) N Melichar-Martinez	3	2
(Norway) U Eikeri (United States) Q Gleason	6	6
(Ukraine) L Kichenok (Indonesia) A Sutjiadi	6	3	[5]
(United States) D Krawczyk (Mexico) G Olmos	4	6	[10]
4	(Kazakhstan) A Danilina (Japan) M Kato	4	6	[10]
WC	(China) Q Tang (Mexico) R Zarazúa	6	2	[6]
M Kozyreva (United Kingdom) M Lumsden	7	6
(Slovakia) T Mihalíková (United Kingdom) O Nicholls	5	3
(Poland) M Chwalińska (Austria) S Kraus	1	6	[10]
(Belgium) M Kempen; A Panova	6	3	[8]
(Japan) S Aoyama (Chinese Taipei) E-s Liang	6	7
3	(Australia) E Perez (Netherlands) D Schuurs	4	5
(United States) A Muhammad (Hungary) F Stollár	3	4
(Australia) M Joint (China) Y Xu	6	6
(Poland) K Piter (Indonesia) J Tjen	6	6^{5}	[10]
2	(China) X Jiang (China) S Zhang	2	7^{7}	[7]

Quarterfinals
(Norway) U Eikeri (United States) Q Gleason	5	7	[10]
(United States) D Krawczyk (Mexico) G Olmos	7	5	[7]
4	(Kazakhstan) A Danilina (Japan) M Kato	3	7^{8}	[3]
M Kozyreva (United Kingdom) M Lumsden	6	6^{6}	[10]
(Poland) M Chwalińska (Austria) S Kraus	5	6	[4]
(Japan) S Aoyama (Chinese Taipei) E-s Liang	7	3	[10]
(Australia) M Joint (China) Y Xu	7^{8}	1	[10]
(Poland) K Piter (Indonesia) J Tjen	6^{6}	6	[8]

Semifinals
(Norway) U Eikeri (United States) Q Gleason	1	6^{6}
M Kozyreva (United Kingdom) M Lumsden	6	7^{8}
(Japan) S Aoyama (Chinese Taipei) E-s Liang	6^{4}	2
(Australia) M Joint (China) Y Xu	7^{7}	6

Final
M Kozyreva (United Kingdom) M Lumsden	2	6	[5]
(Australia) M Joint (China) Y Xu	6	4	[10]
