= 2009 Monterrey Open – Doubles =

Doubles
- 2009 Monterrey Open

Final
- Champion: (France) Nathalie Dechy (Italy) Mara Santangelo
- Runner-up: (Czech Republic) Iveta Benešová (Czech Republic) Barbora Záhlavová-Strýcová
- Score: 6–3, 6–4

Details
- Draw: 16
- Seeds: 4

Events
Singles	Doubles
Monterrey Open	· 2010 →

In the final, Nathalie Dechy and Mara Santangelo defeated Iveta Benešová and Barbora Záhlavová-Strýcová, 6–3, 6–4.

== Seeds ==
1. (Russia) Maria Kirilenko / (Italy) Flavia Pennetta (Kirilenko withdrew due to a left knee inflammation)
2. (United States) Vania King / (China) Zheng Jie (semifinals)
3. (Germany) Anna-Lena Grönefeld / (Israel) Shahar Pe'er (first round)
4. (France) Nathalie Dechy / (Italy) Mara Santangelo (champions)

== Draw ==
=== Key ===
- Q = Qualifier
- WC = Wild card
- LL = Lucky loser
- Alt = Alternate
- SE = Special exempt
- PR = Protected ranking
- ITF = ITF entry
- JE = Junior exempt
- w/o = Walkover
- r = Retired
- d = Defaulted
- SR = Special ranking

=== Draw ===
First round
ALT	(Japan) R Fujiwara (South Africa) C Scheepers	7	6
(Latvia) L Dekmeijere (United States) M Washington	6^{5}	3
(New Zealand) M Erakovic (Czech Republic) L Šafářová	6	7
(Ukraine) O Savchuk (Turkey) İ Şenoğlu	3	5
3	(Germany) A-L Grönefeld (Israel) S Pe'er	4	6^{7}
(Czech Republic) I Benešová (Czech Republic) B Záhlavová-Strýcová	6	7
(Czech Republic) P Cetkovská (Slovenia) A Klepač	7	6
(Ukraine) M Koryttseva (Russia) A Kudryavtseva	5	4
(United Kingdom) S Borwell (United States) C Nagle	3	6	[10]
(Russia) M Kondratieva (France) S Lefèvre	6	3	[8]
(United States) J Craybas (Romania) E Gallovits	5	4
4	(France) N Dechy (Italy) M Santangelo	7	6
(Hungary) Á Szávay (Czech Republic) V Uhlířová	6	1	[7]
(Hungary) M Czink (South Africa) N Grandin	4	6	[10]
WC	(Mexico) E Clarke (Mexico) D Múñoz Gallegos	0	3
2	(United States) V King (China) J Zheng	6	6

Quarterfinals
ALT	(Japan) R Fujiwara (South Africa) C Scheepers	3	4
(New Zealand) M Erakovic (Czech Republic) L Šafářová	6	6
(Czech Republic) I Benešová (Czech Republic) B Záhlavová-Strýcová	6	7
(Czech Republic) P Cetkovská (Slovenia) A Klepač	4	6^{4}
(United Kingdom) S Borwell (United States) C Nagle	5	6^{2}
4	(France) N Dechy (Italy) M Santangelo	7	7
(Hungary) M Czink (South Africa) N Grandin	2	2
2	(United States) V King (China) J Zheng	6	6

Semifinals
(New Zealand) M Erakovic (Czech Republic) L Šafářová	2	2
(Czech Republic) I Benešová (Czech Republic) B Záhlavová-Strýcová	6	6
4	(France) N Dechy (Italy) M Santangelo	6	6
2	(United States) V King (China) J Zheng	4	2

Final
(Czech Republic) I Benešová (Czech Republic) B Záhlavová-Strýcová	3	4
4	(France) N Dechy (Italy) M Santangelo	6	6
