= 2011 Monterrey Open – Doubles =

Doubles
- 2011 Monterrey Open

Final
- Champions: (Czech Republic) Iveta Benešová (Czech Republic) Barbora Záhlavová-Strýcová
- Runners-up: (Germany) Anna-Lena Grönefeld (United States) Vania King
- Score: 6–7^{(8–10)}, 6–2, [10–6]

Details
- Draw: 16
- Seeds: 4

Events
Singles	Doubles
← 2010 ·	Monterrey Open	· 2012 →

Iveta Benešová and Barbora Záhlavová-Strýcová successfully defended their last year's title, defeating Anna-Lena Grönefeld and Vania King 6–7^{(8–10)}, 6–2, [10–6] in the final.

== Seeds ==
1. (Czech Republic) Iveta Benešová / (Czech Republic) Barbora Záhlavová-Strýcová (champions)
2. (Germany) Anna-Lena Grönefeld / (United States) Vania King (final)
3. (Germany) Julia Görges / (Slovenia) Polona Hercog (semifinals)
4. (Czech Republic) Andrea Hlaváčková / (Czech Republic) Lucie Hradecká (semifinals)

== Draw ==
=== Key ===
- Q = Qualifier
- WC = Wild card
- LL = Lucky loser
- Alt = Alternate
- SE = Special exempt
- PR = Protected ranking
- ITF = ITF entry
- JE = Junior exempt
- w/o = Walkover
- r = Retired
- d = Defaulted
- SR = Special ranking

=== Draw ===
First round
1	(Czech Republic) I Benešová (Czech Republic) B Záhlavová-Strýcová	6	7
(Russia) M Kondratieva (France) S Lefèvre	3	5
(France) A Cornet (Ukraine) O Savchuk	7	6
(Czech Republic) P Cetkovská (Czech Republic) R Voráčová	5	2
3	(Germany) J Görges (Slovenia) P Hercog	6	6
WC	(Mexico) X Hermoso (Mexico) I López	0	2
(United Kingdom) S Borwell (Latvia) L Dekmeijere	6^{2}	6^{5}
(Canada) M-È Pelletier (United States) A Rolle	7	7
(Czech Republic) E Birnerová (Sweden) J Larsson	6	6
(Turkey) İ Şenoğlu (Germany) J Wöhr	4	2
WC	(Serbia) J Janković (Italy) R Oprandi	2	4
4	(Czech Republic) A Hlaváčková (Czech Republic) L Hradecká	6	6
(Greece) E Daniilidou (Slovenia) A Klepač	5	5
(Russia) A Kudryavtseva (Russia) A Rodionova	7	7
(Italy) S Errani (United States) M Oudin	4	7	[6]
2	(Germany) A-L Grönefeld (United States) V King	6	5	[10]

Quarterfinals
1	(Czech Republic) I Benešová (Czech Republic) B Záhlavová-Strýcová	3	6	[10]
(France) A Cornet (Ukraine) O Savchuk	6	2	[6]
3	(Germany) J Görges (Slovenia) P Hercog	7	4	[10]
(Canada) M-È Pelletier (United States) A Rolle	6^{5}	6	[6]
(Czech Republic) E Birnerová (Sweden) J Larsson	1	2
4	(Czech Republic) A Hlaváčková (Czech Republic) L Hradecká	6	6
(Russia) A Kudryavtseva (Russia) A Rodionova	2	5
2	(Germany) A-L Grönefeld (United States) V King	6	7

Semifinals
1	(Czech Republic) I Benešová (Czech Republic) B Záhlavová-Strýcová	6	6
3	(Germany) J Görges (Slovenia) P Hercog	4	3
4	(Czech Republic) A Hlaváčková (Czech Republic) L Hradecká	6	1	[6]
2	(Germany) A-L Grönefeld (United States) V King	2	6	[10]

Final
1	(Czech Republic) I Benešová (Czech Republic) B Záhlavová-Strýcová	6^{8}	6	[10]
2	(Germany) A-L Grönefeld (United States) V King	7	2	[6]
