= 2011 BNP Paribas Open – Women's singles =

Women's singles
- 2011 BNP Paribas Open

Final
- Champion: (Denmark) Caroline Wozniacki
- Runner-up: (France) Marion Bartoli
- Score: 6–1, 2–6, 6–3

Details
- Draw: 96
- Seeds: 32

Events
Singles	men	women
Doubles	men	women
- BNP Paribas Open

Caroline Wozniacki defeated Marion Bartoli in the final, 6–1, 2–6, 6–3 to win the women's singles tennis title at the 2011 Indian Wells Masters.

Jelena Janković was the defending champion, but lost to Ana Ivanovic in the fourth round.

== Seeds ==
All seeds received a bye into the second round.

1. (Denmark) Caroline Wozniacki (champion)
2. (Belgium) Kim Clijsters (fourth round, retired due to a right shoulder injury)
3. (Russia) Vera Zvonareva (third round)
4. (Australia) Samantha Stosur (third round)
5. (Italy) Francesca Schiavone (fourth round)
6. (Serbia) Jelena Janković (fourth round)
7. (China) Li Na (second round)
8. (Belarus) Victoria Azarenka (quarterfinals, retired due to a left leg injury)
9. (Poland) Agnieszka Radwańska (fourth round)
10. (Israel) Shahar Pe'er (quarterfinals)
11. (Russia) Svetlana Kuznetsova (second round)
12. (Czech Republic) Petra Kvitová (second round)
13. (Italy) Flavia Pennetta (third round)
14. (Estonia) Kaia Kanepi (third round)
15. (France) Marion Bartoli (final)
16. (Russia) Maria Sharapova (semifinals)
17. (Russia) Anastasia Pavlyuchenkova (third round)
18. (Russia) Nadia Petrova (fourth round)
19. (Serbia) Ana Ivanovic (quarterfinals)
20. (France) Aravane Rezaï (third round)
21. (Germany) Andrea Petkovic (third round)
22. (Russia) Alisa Kleybanova (fourth round)
23. (Belgium) Yanina Wickmayer (semifinals)
24. (Russia) Maria Kirilenko (third round)
25. (Slovakia) Dominika Cibulková (fourth round)
26. (Slovakia) Daniela Hantuchová (second round)
27. (Romania) Alexandra Dulgheru (second round)
28. (Spain) María José Martínez Sánchez (third round)
29. (Australia) Jarmila Groth (second round)
30. (Bulgaria) Tsvetana Pironkova (second round)
31. (Czech Republic) Klára Zakopalová (second round)
32. (Germany) Julia Görges (third round)

== Draw ==
Key

- Q = Qualifier
- WC = Wild card
- LL = Lucky loser
- Alt = Alternate
- ITF = ITF entry
- PR = Protected ranking
- SR = Special ranking
- SE = Special exempt
- JE = Junior exempt
- JR = Junior Accelerator Programme entrant
- CO = College Accelerator Programme entrant
- NG = Next Gen Accelerator Program entrant
- w/o = Walkover
- r = Retired
- d = Defaulted

=== Finals ===
Quarterfinals
1	(Denmark) Caroline Wozniacki	3
8	(Belarus) Victoria Azarenka	0^{r}
16	(Russia) Maria Sharapova	6	5	6
(China) Peng Shuai	2	7	3
10	(Israel) Shahar Pe'er	3	3
23	(Belgium) Yanina Wickmayer	6	6
19	(Serbia) Ana Ivanovic	4	6^{4}
15	(France) Marion Bartoli	6	7^{7}

Semifinals
1	(Denmark) Caroline Wozniacki	6	6
16	(Russia) Maria Sharapova	1	2
23	(Belgium) Yanina Wickmayer	1	3
15	(France) Marion Bartoli	6	6

Final
1	(Denmark) Caroline Wozniacki	6	2	6
15	(France) Marion Bartoli	1	6	3

=== Top half ===
==== Section 1 ====
First round
Q	(United States) J Hampton	2	4
WC	(United States) S Stephens	6	6
Q	(Spain) N Llagostera Vives	6	2	4
(Romania) S Halep	0	6	6
(Hungary) Á Szávay	6	6
WC	(United States) J Craybas	3	3
(Italy) R Vinci	6	5	2
(United Kingdom) E Baltacha	2	7	6

Second round
1	(Denmark) C Wozniacki	6	6
WC	(United States) S Stephens	3	2
(Romania) S Halep	5	0
28	(Spain) MJ Martínez Sánchez	7	6
22	(Russia) A Kleybanova	6	7
(Hungary) Á Szávay	3	5
(United Kingdom) E Baltacha	4	6	4
13	(Italy) F Pennetta	6	3	6

Third round
1	(Denmark) C Wozniacki	6	6
28	(Spain) MJ Martínez Sánchez	1	3
22	(Russia) A Kleybanova	6	6
13	(Italy) F Pennetta	3	4

Fourth round
1	(Denmark) C Wozniacki	2	6	6
22	(Russia) A Kleybanova	6	3	1

==== Section 2 ====
First round
(United States) V Lepchenko	1	2
(Czech Republic) I Benešová	6	6
(Russia) A Chakvetadze	7	6
Q	(Japan) M Doi	6^{0}	1
PR	(Poland) U Radwańska	3	6	7
(Serbia) B Jovanovski	6	4	6^{6}
(Russia) E Makarova	6	4	6
Q	(Canada) R Marino	4	6	4

Second round
9	(Poland) A Radwańska	7	6
(Czech Republic) I Benešová	6^{5}	4
(Russia) A Chakvetadze	2	3^{r}
24	(Russia) M Kirilenko	6	1
31	(Czech Republic) K Zakopalová	3	7	2
PR	(Poland) U Radwańska	6	5	6
(Russia) E Makarova	4	3
8	(Belarus) V Azarenka	6	6

Third round
9	(Poland) A Radwańska	6	2	7
24	(Russia) M Kirilenko	0	6	5
PR	(Poland) U Radwańska	6^{3}	3
8	(Belarus) V Azarenka	7	6

Fourth round
9	(Poland) A Radwańska	6	3	6^{3}
8	(Belarus) V Azarenka	4	6	7

==== Section 3 ====
First round
(Germany) A Kerber	2	1
Q	(Spain) L Pous Tió	6	6
(Spain) A Parra Santonja	3	3
(Russia) D Safina	6	6
(Japan) A Morita	2	6	6^{4}
Q	(China) S Zhang	6	2	7
(Spain) A Medina Garrigues	6	6
Q	(Austria) T Paszek	1	1

Second round
4	(Australia) S Stosur	6	6
Q	(Spain) L Pous Tió	2	2
(Russia) D Safina	7	6
26	(Slovakia) D Hantuchová	6^{2}	4
20	(France) A Rezaï	7	6
Q	(China) S Zhang	6^{5}	0
(Spain) A Medina Garrigues	5	7	1
16	(Russia) M Sharapova	7	6^{3}	6

Third round
4	(Australia) S Stosur	6^{2}	4
(Russia) D Safina	7	6
20	(France) A Rezaï	2	2
16	(Russia) M Sharapova	6	6

Fourth round
(Russia) D Safina	2	0
16	(Russia) M Sharapova	6	6

==== Section 4 ====
First round
(Uzbekistan) A Amanmuradova	3	1
WC	(United States) C McHale	6	6
(Sweden) S Arvidsson	6	6
(China) J Zheng	3	2
Q	(Belgium) K Flipkens	6^{6}	2
Q	(Czech Republic) L Hradecká	7	6
(Czech Republic) R Voráčová	5	1
(China) S Peng	7	6

Second round
11	(Russia) S Kuznetsova	6^{4}	6^{7}
WC	(United States) C McHale	7	7
(Sweden) S Arvidsson	4	6^{3}
18	(Russia) N Petrova	6	7
27	(Romania) A Dulgheru	6	4	4
Q	(Czech Republic) L Hradecká	4	6	6
(China) S Peng	4	6	6
7	(China) N Li	6	3	3

Third round
WC	(United States) C McHale	6	4	2
18	(Russia) N Petrova	3	6	6
Q	(Czech Republic) L Hradecká	3	6	5
(China) S Peng	6	4	7

Fourth round
18	(Russia) N Petrova	4	7	3
(China) S Peng	6	5	6

=== Bottom half ===
==== Section 5 ====
First round
(Czech Republic) Z Ondrášková	6	6
WC	(United States) L Davis	2	1
(Switzerland) P Schnyder	1	4
Q	(France) A Cornet	6	6
(Slovenia) P Hercog	5	6^{6}
(Latvia) A Sevastova	7	7
(Russia) V Dushevina	4	4
(United States) B Mattek-Sands	6	6

Second round
5	(Italy) F Schiavone	6	6
(Czech Republic) Z Ondrášková	2	0
Q	(France) A Cornet	7	3	6
30	(Bulgaria) T Pironkova	5	6	2
17	(Russia) A Pavlyuchenkova	6	7
(Latvia) A Sevastova	2	5
(United States) B Mattek-Sands	6	6^{5}	3
10	(Israel) S Pe'er	4	7	6

Third round
5	(Italy) F Schiavone	6	6
Q	(France) A Cornet	2	3
17	(Russia) A Pavlyuchenkova	6	3	5
10	(Israel) S Pe'er	2	6	7

Fourth round
5	(Italy) F Schiavone	4	6	6^{3}
10	(Israel) S Pe'er	6	3	7

==== Section 6 ====
First round
WC	(United States) V King	6	3	2
(Argentina) G Dulko	2	6	6
(United States) M Oudin	7	6
(Russia) E Vesnina	6^{2}	2
(Italy) R Oprandi	1^{r}
WC	(India) S Mirza	2
(Belarus) O Govortsova	5	6	3
(Switzerland) T Bacsinszky	7	2	6

Second round
14	(Estonia) K Kanepi	3	6	6
(Argentina) G Dulko	6	2	2
(United States) M Oudin	4	3
23	(Belgium) Y Wickmayer	6	6
25	(Slovakia) D Cibulková	6	6
WC	(India) S Mirza	3	3
(Switzerland) T Bacsinszky	3	6^{4}
3	(Russia) V Zvonareva	6	7

Third round
14	(Estonia) K Kanepi	6	4	1
23	(Belgium) Y Wickmayer	3	6	6
25	(Slovakia) D Cibulková	4	7	6
3	(Russia) V Zvonareva	6	6^{4}	4

Fourth round
23	(Belgium) Y Wickmayer	7	7
25	(Slovakia) D Cibulková	5	5

==== Section 7 ====
First round
(Romania) E Gallovits-Hall	6	3	4
WC	(United States) C Vandeweghe	4	6	6
(Sweden) J Larsson	2	6	3
(Austria) S Bammer	6	3	6
(Kazakhstan) Y Shvedova	4	5
(Japan) K Date-Krumm	6	7
WC	(United States) A Riske	2	1
(Czech Republic) B Záhlavová-Strýcová	6	6

Second round
6	(Serbia) J Janković	6	6
WC	(United States) C Vandeweghe	2	1
(Austria) S Bammer	1	3
32	(Germany) J Görges	6	6
19	(Serbia) A Ivanovic	6	6
(Japan) K Date-Krumm	4	2
(Czech Republic) B Záhlavová-Strýcová	3	6	7
12	(Czech Republic) P Kvitová	6	2	5

Third round
6	(Serbia) J Janković	6	6
32	(Germany) J Görges	2	4
19	(Serbia) A Ivanovic	6	6
(Czech Republic) B Záhlavová-Strýcová	2	2

Fourth round
6	(Serbia) J Janković	4	2
19	(Serbia) A Ivanovic	6	6

==== Section 8 ====
First round
(Australia) A Rodionova	3	1
Q	(Romania) M Niculescu	6	6
(Germany) K Barrois	6^{9}	7	0
(Czech Republic) L Šafářová	7	6^{5}	6
(Italy) S Errani	6
(Hungary) G Arn	6^{r}
Q	(Romania) S Cîrstea	6	3	3
(Russia) A Kudryavtseva	3	6	6

Second round
15	(France) M Bartoli	2	6	6
Q	(Romania) M Niculescu	6	3	2
(Czech Republic) L Šafářová	6^{8}	5
21	(Germany) A Petkovic	7	7
29	(Australia) J Groth	5	6	2
(Italy) S Errani	7	4	6
(Russia) A Kudryavtseva	2	0
2	(Belgium) K Clijsters	6	6

Third round
15	(France) M Bartoli	6	6
21	(Germany) A Petkovic	4	2
(Italy) S Errani	3	6	4
2	(Belgium) K Clijsters	6	2	6

Fourth round
15	(France) M Bartoli	3	3
2	(Belgium) K Clijsters	6	1^{r}

== Qualifying ==
=== Seeds ===
1. (Canada) Rebecca Marino (qualified)
2. (Romania) Monica Niculescu (qualified)
3. (France) Alizé Cornet (qualified)
4. (France) Mathilde Johansson (qualifying competition)
5. (Russia) Evgeniya Rodina (first round)
6. (South Africa) Chanelle Scheepers (first round)
7. (China) Zhang Shuai (qualified)
8. (Czech Republic) Lucie Hradecká (qualified)
9. (Spain) Laura Pous Tió (qualified)
10. (Russia) Ksenia Pervak (qualifying competition)
11. (Austria) Tamira Paszek (qualified)
12. (Romania) Sorana Cîrstea (qualified)
13. (France) Virginie Razzano (first round)
14. (Croatia) Petra Martić (qualifying competition)
15. (Czech Republic) Andrea Hlaváčková (qualifying competition)
16. (Croatia) Mirjana Lučić (qualifying competition)
17. (Austria) Patricia Mayr-Achleitner (first round)
18. (Czech Republic) Sandra Záhlavová (first round)
19. (Belgium) Kirsten Flipkens (qualified)
20. (Japan) Junri Namigata (first round)
21. (France) Pauline Parmentier (first round)
22. (United Kingdom) Anne Keothavong (first round)
23. (Netherlands) Arantxa Rus (first round)
24. (Russia) Vesna Manasieva (qualifying competition)

=== Qualifiers ===
1. (Canada) Rebecca Marino
2. (Romania) Monica Niculescu
3. (France) Alizé Cornet
4. (Belgium) Kirsten Flipkens
5. (Spain) Nuria Llagostera Vives
6. (Japan) Misaki Doi
7. (China) Zhang Shuai
8. (Czech Republic) Lucie Hradecká
9. (Spain) Laura Pous Tió
10. (United States) Jamie Hampton
11. (Austria) Tamira Paszek
12. (Romania) Sorana Cîrstea

=== Qualifying draw ===
Key

- Q = Qualifier
- WC = Wild card
- LL = Lucky loser
- Alt = Alternate
- ITF = ITF entry
- PR = Protected ranking
- SR = Special ranking
- SE = Special exempt
- JE = Junior exempt
- JR = Junior Accelerator Programme entrant
- CO = College Accelerator Programme entrant
- NG = Next Gen Accelerator Program entrant
- w/o = Walkover
- r = Retired
- d = Defaulted

==== First qualifier ====
First round
1	(Canada) Rebecca Marino	7	7
(Germany) Tatjana Malek	5	5
(Czech Republic) Petra Cetkovská	6	1	6
13	(France) Virginie Razzano	4	6	1

Qualifying competition
1	(Canada) Rebecca Marino	6	1	6
(Czech Republic) Petra Cetkovská	3	6	2

==== Second qualifier ====
First round
2	(Romania) Monica Niculescu	6	6
(Ukraine) Lesia Tsurenko	2	3
(Germany) Kathrin Wörle	7	6
17	(Austria) Patricia Mayr-Achleitner	5	4

Qualifying competition
2	(Romania) Monica Niculescu	6	6
(Germany) Kathrin Wörle	1	4

==== Third qualifier ====
First round
3	(France) Alizé Cornet	6	6
(China) Han Xinyun	3	1
(Czech Republic) Eva Birnerová	4	6	5
24	(Russia) Vesna Manasieva	6	4	7

Qualifying competition
3	(France) Alizé Cornet	6	4	6
24	(Russia) Vesna Manasieva	3	6	0

==== Fourth qualifier ====
First round
4	(France) Mathilde Johansson	4	7	6
WC	(United States) Krista Hardebeck	6	5	3
(United Kingdom) Heather Watson	2	6^{4}
19	(Belgium) Kirsten Flipkens	6	7

Qualifying competition
4	(France) Mathilde Johansson	4	1
19	(Belgium) Kirsten Flipkens	6	6

==== Fifth qualifier ====
First round
5	(Russia) Evgeniya Rodina	6^{4}	6	1
(Ukraine) Olga Savchuk	7	2	6
(Spain) Nuria Llagostera Vives	2	6	6
18	(Czech Republic) Sandra Záhlavová	6	3	4

Qualifying competition
(Ukraine) Olga Savchuk	2	6	3
(Spain) Nuria Llagostera Vives	6	2	6

==== Sixth qualifier ====
First round
6	(South Africa) Chanelle Scheepers	5	4
(Japan) Misaki Doi	7	6
WC	(United States) Maria Sanchez	5	3
16	(Croatia) Mirjana Lučić	7	6

Qualifying competition
(Japan) Misaki Doi	6	6
16	(Croatia) Mirjana Lučić	2	2

==== Seventh qualifier ====
First round
7	(China) Zhang Shuai	6	7
(Australia) Sophie Ferguson	4	5
(Russia) Anastasia Pivovarova	6	6
21	(France) Pauline Parmentier	0	4

Qualifying competition
7	(China) Zhang Shuai	6	6
(Russia) Anastasia Pivovarova	4	2

==== Eighth qualifier ====
First round
8	(Czech Republic) Lucie Hradecká	5	6	6
(Belarus) Anastasiya Yakimova	7	3	4
(Canada) Aleksandra Wozniak	6	0	1
14	(Croatia) Petra Martić	3	6	6

Qualifying competition
8	(Czech Republic) Lucie Hradecká	6	6
14	(Croatia) Petra Martić	4	3

==== Ninth qualifier ====
First round
9	(Spain) Laura Pous Tió	6	3	4
(Georgia (country)) Anna Tatishvili	3	6	0r
WC	(United States) Madison Keys	6	6
20	(Japan) Junri Namigata	4	4

Qualifying competition
9	(Spain) Laura Pous Tió	6	7
WC	(United States) Madison Keys	3	6^{2}

==== Tenth qualifier ====
First round
10	(Russia) Ksenia Pervak	0	6	6
(Chinese Taipei) Chan Yung-jan	6	1	4
(United States) Jamie Hampton	3	7	6
23	(Netherlands) Arantxa Rus	6	6^{5}	2

Qualifying competition
10	(Russia) Ksenia Pervak	4	0^{r}
(United States) Jamie Hampton	6	3

==== Eleventh qualifier ====
First round
11	(Austria) Tamira Paszek	6	6
WC	(United States) Madison Brengle	0	1
(United States) Irina Falconi	2	1
15	(Czech Republic) Andrea Hlaváčková	6	6

Qualifying competition
11	(Austria) Tamira Paszek	2	6	6
15	(Czech Republic) Andrea Hlaváčková	6	1	2

==== Twelfth qualifier ====
First round
12	(Romania) Sorana Cîrstea	4	7	6
WC	(Germany) Sabine Lisicki	6	6^{2}	2
WC	(Puerto Rico) Monica Puig	6	6
22	(United Kingdom) Anne Keothavong	4	1

Qualifying competition
12	(Romania) Sorana Cîrstea	3	6	6
WC	(Puerto Rico) Monica Puig	6	4	1
