= 2009 Monterrey Open – Singles =

Singles
- 2009 Monterrey Open

Final
- Champion: (France) Marion Bartoli
- Runner-up: (China) Li Na
- Score: 6–4, 6–3

Details
- Draw: 32
- Seeds: 8

Events
Singles	Doubles
- Monterrey Open

Marion Bartoli won in the final 6–4, 6–3 against Li Na.

== Seeds ==
1. (Poland) Agnieszka Radwańska (first round)
2. (France) Marion Bartoli (champion)
3. (Italy) Flavia Pennetta (second round)
4. (China) Zheng Jie (semifinals)
5. (Hungary) Ágnes Szávay (second round)
6. (Czech Republic) Iveta Benešová (semifinals)
7. (Argentina) Gisela Dulko (quarterfinals)
8. (Russia) Maria Kirilenko (second round, retired due to left knee inflammation)

== Draw ==
Key

- Q = Qualifier
- WC = Wild card
- LL = Lucky loser
- Alt = Alternate
- ITF = ITF entry
- PR = Protected ranking
- SR = Special ranking
- SE = Special exempt
- JE = Junior exempt
- JR = Junior Accelerator Programme entrant
- CO = College Accelerator Programme entrant
- NG = Next Gen Accelerator Program entrant
- w/o = Walkover
- r = Retired
- d = Defaulted

=== Finals ===
Semifinals
(China) Li Na	6	6
6	(Czech Republic) Iveta Benešová	3	3
4	(China) Zheng Jie	5	3
2	(France) Marion Bartoli	7	6

Final
(China) Li Na	4	3
2	(France) Marion Bartoli	6	6

=== Top half ===
First round
1	(Poland) A Radwańska	6^{5}	6	0
(China) N Li	7	4	6
(Slovakia) J Groth	3	2
(Czech Republic) P Cetkovská	6	6
WC	(Mexico) M Torres Sandoval	4	1
(Czech Republic) L Šafářová	6	6
(New Zealand) M Erakovic	4	3
8	(Russia) M Kirilenko	6	6
3	(Italy) F Pennetta	6	6
(United States) J Craybas	1	0
(Czech Republic) B Záhlavová-Strýcová	6	2	7
(Germany) A-L Grönefeld	3	6	6^{4}
Q	(Netherlands) A Rus	4	6	2
(Italy) R Vinci	6	2	6
(Israel) S Pe'er	4	2
6	(Czech Republic) I Benešová	6	6

Second round
(China) N Li	6	6
(Czech Republic) P Cetkovská	3	4
(Czech Republic) L Šafářová	6	4
8	(Russia) M Kirilenko	4	1	r
3	(Italy) F Pennetta	6^{4}	6	4
(Czech Republic) B Záhlavová-Strýcová	7	2	6
(Italy) R Vinci	6^{4}	2
6	(Czech Republic) I Benešová	7	6

Quarterfinals
(China) N Li	6	7
(Czech Republic) L Šafářová	3	6^{3}
(Czech Republic) B Záhlavová-Strýcová	5	4
6	(Czech Republic) I Benešová	7	6

Semifinals
(China) N Li	6	6
6	(Czech Republic) I Benešová	3	3

=== Bottom half ===
First round
7	(Argentina) G Dulko	6	7
(France) N Dechy	4	5
(Ukraine) M Koryttseva	6	6
Q	(Slovakia) L Wienerová	4	1
(Hungary) M Czink	7	6
(Russia) A Kudryavtseva	5	1
WC	(Poland) U Radwańska	3	3
4	(China) J Zheng	6	6
5	(Hungary) Á Szávay	6	6
(France) P Parmentier	2	2
(Czech Republic) K Zakopalová	1	4
Q	(United States) V King	6	6
(Romania) E Gallovits	4	6	3
WC	(Slovakia) M Rybáriková	6	3	6
Q	(Netherlands) M Krajicek	2	4
2	(France) M Bartoli	6	6

Second round
7	(Argentina) G Dulko	6	6
(Ukraine) M Koryttseva	2	4
(Hungary) M Czink	3	4
4	(China) J Zheng	6	6
5	(Hungary) Á Szávay	6	4	3
Q	(United States) V King	3	6	6
WC	(Slovakia) M Rybáriková	4	0
2	(France) M Bartoli	6	6

Quarterfinals
7	(Argentina) G Dulko	3	2
4	(China) J Zheng	6	6
Q	(United States) V King	6	2	3
2	(France) M Bartoli	2	6	6

Semifinals
4	(China) J Zheng	5	3
2	(France) M Bartoli	7	6
