= Iveta Benešová =

Czech tennis player (born 1983)

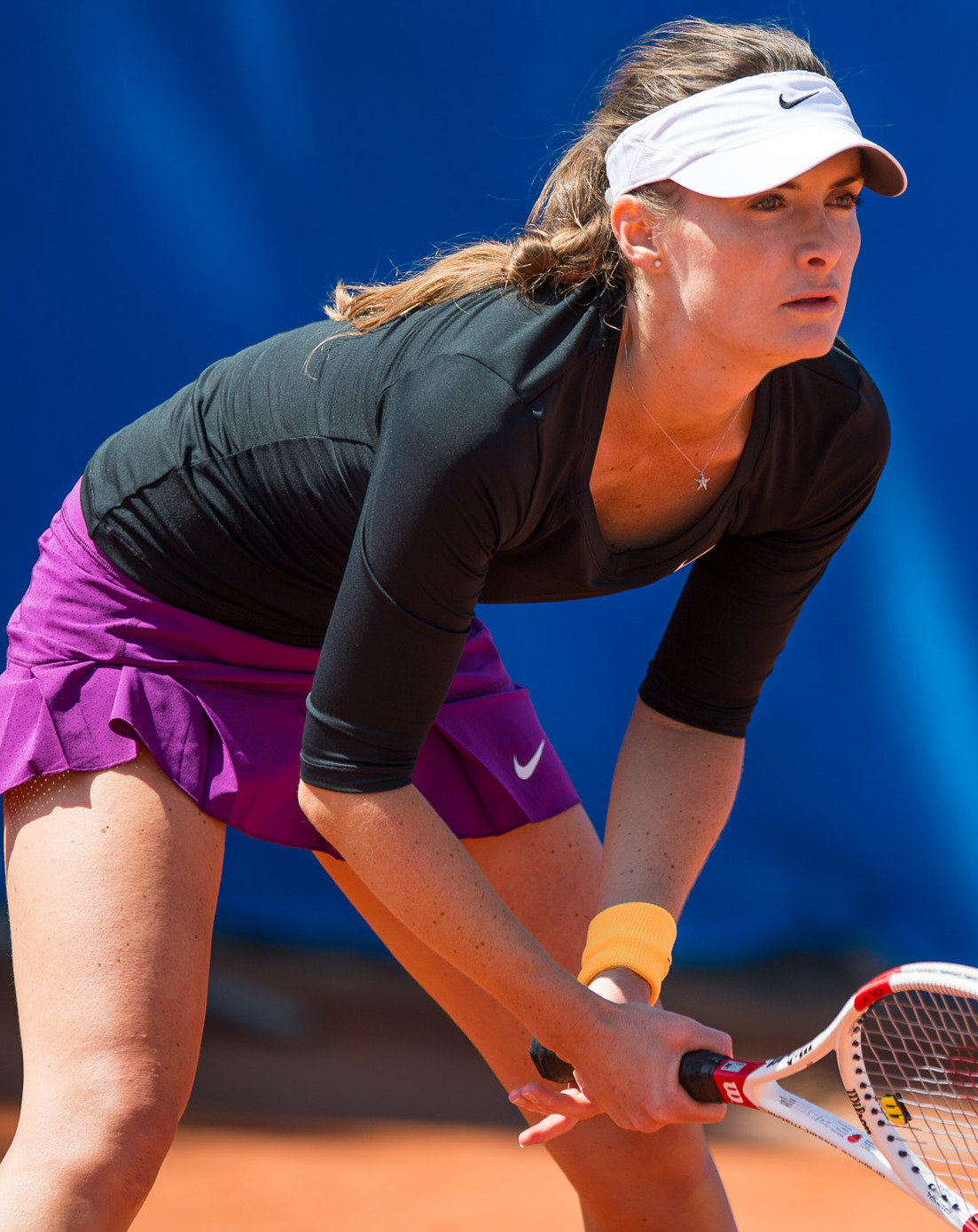
- Benešová at the 2014 Nürnberger Versicherungscup
- ITF name: Iveta Melzer
- Country (sports): Czech Republic
- Residence: Most, Czech Republic
- Born: 1 February 1983 (age 43) Most, Czechoslovakia
- Height: 1.70 m (5 ft 7 in)
- Turned pro: 1998
- Retired: 2014
- Plays: Left-handed (two-handed backhand)
- Prize money: US$ 3,329,488

Singles
- Career record: 411–341
- Career titles: 2
- Highest ranking: No. 25 (6 April 2009)

Grand Slam singles results
- Australian Open: 4R (2011, 2012)
- French Open: 3R (2008, 2009)
- Wimbledon: 2R (2007, 2009, 2011)
- US Open: 2R (2004, 2008, 2010)

Doubles
- Career record: 290–230
- Career titles: 14
- Highest ranking: No. 17 (31 January 2011)

Grand Slam doubles results
- Australian Open: 3R (2008, 2011)
- French Open: 3R (2005, 2006, 2010)
- Wimbledon: 3R (2010)
- US Open: QF (2011)

Mixed doubles
- Career titles: 1

Grand Slam mixed doubles results
- Australian Open: SF (2009)
- French Open: QF (2011)
- Wimbledon: W (2011)
- US Open: 2R (2009)

Team competitions
- Fed Cup: 11–12

Iveta Benešová (Czech pronunciation: [ˈɪvɛta ˈbɛnɛʃovaː]) (formerly Melzer, Czech: Melzerová; born 1 February 1983) is a Czech former tennis player. She began playing tennis aged seven and turned professional in 1998. She won two WTA Tour singles and 14 doubles tournaments, and one Grand Slam title in mixed doubles at the 2011 Wimbledon Championships. She announced her retirement from tennis on 13 August 2014.

== Career ==
=== 2004–2008 ===
Benešová won her first WTA Tour title at the 2004 Mexican Open, defeating Flavia Pennetta in the final.

At the 2006 Australian Open, for the first time, she reached the third round of a Grand Slam championship by beating fifth seed Mary Pierce. She lost in the next round to former world No. 1, Martina Hingis.

Entering as a qualifier in the 2008 French Open, she reached the third round, beating 15th seed and compatriate Nicole Vaidišová in the first round, but lost to Petra Cetkovská.

=== 2009 ===
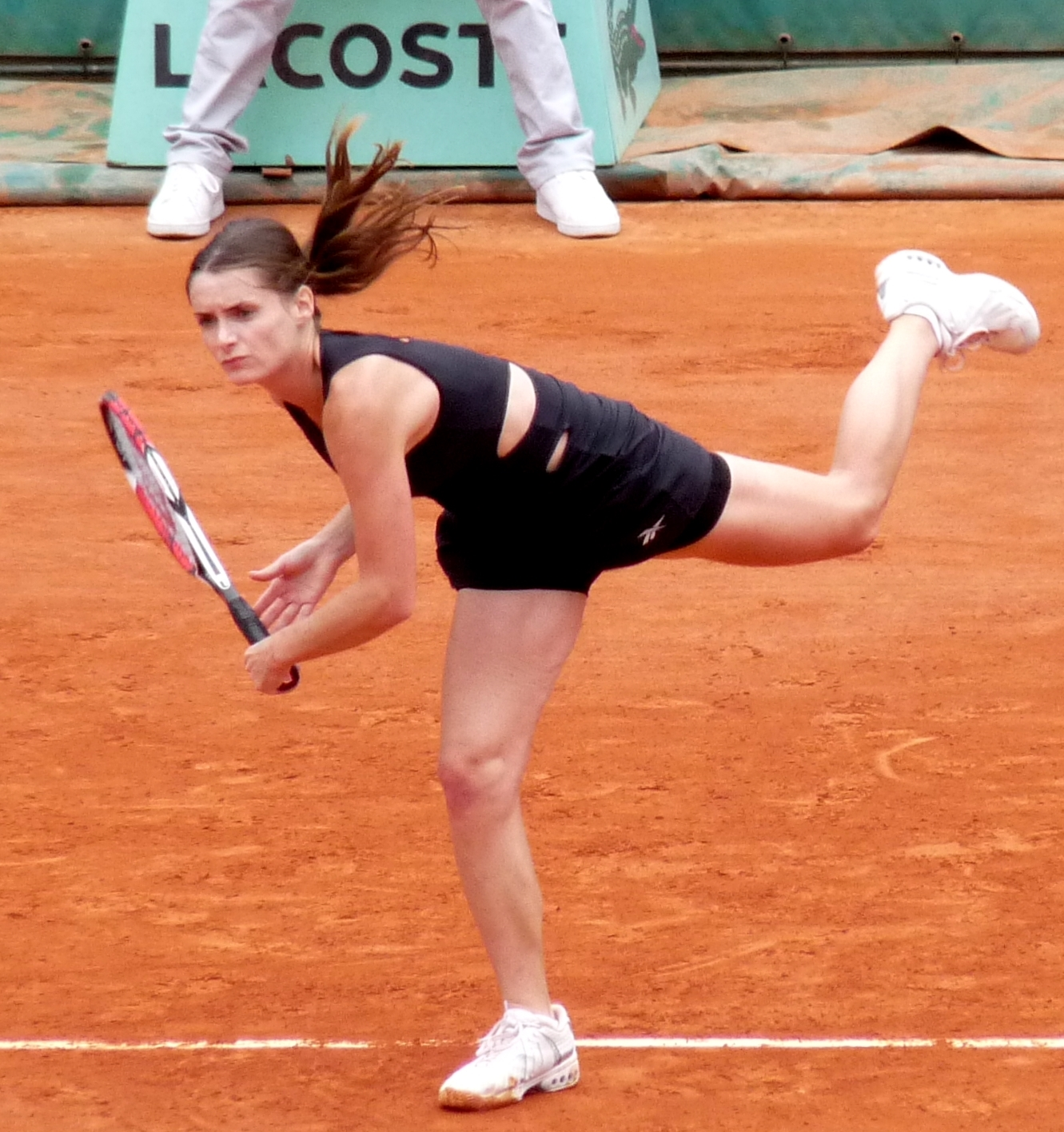
Benešová at the 2009 French Open

Benešová started the year by playing the first edition of the Brisbane International. She lost in the first round to qualifier Sesil Karatantcheva. A week later, Benešová lost the final of the Hobart International to fellow-Czech Petra Kvitová. At the Australian Open, she lost in the second round to eventual semifinalist and fourth-seeded Elena Dementieva.

Immediately after Australian, Benešová played in front of her home crowd in the Fed Cup tie against Spain. Despite losing her singles rubber to Nuria Llagostera Vives, the Czech team advanced to the semifinals after winning the tie 4–1.

At the Open GdF Suez in Paris, she lost in the first round to world No. 1, Serena Williams. Benešová then reached the semifinals of the tournament in Acapulco, a clay-court event. In the quarterfinals, she beat Mathilde Johansson, before losing to defending champion Flavia Pennetta.

On 6 April 2009, Benešová achieved her career-high singles ranking of world No. 25.

Seeded 6th at the first edition of the Monterrey Open, she beat fellow Czech Barbora Záhlavová-Strýcová in the quarterfinals, before losing in the semifinals to unseeded Li Na.

Benešová fell to Ana Ivanovic in the third round of the French Open.

At Wimbledon, she beat Katie O'Brien, before falling to Jelena Janković in the second round.

=== 2010 ===
In singles, she defeated Simona Halep in the final of the Morocco Open to win her first WTA Tour trophy since 2004.

In doubles, she won three tournaments. Along with Barbora Záhlavová-Strýcová, she grabbed the titles in Paris as their opponents Cara Black and Liezel Huber withdrew and Monterrey defeating Anna-Lena Grönefeld and Vania King. Partnering with Anabel Medina Garrigues, Benešová won in Fes, making her winning both singles and doubles there.

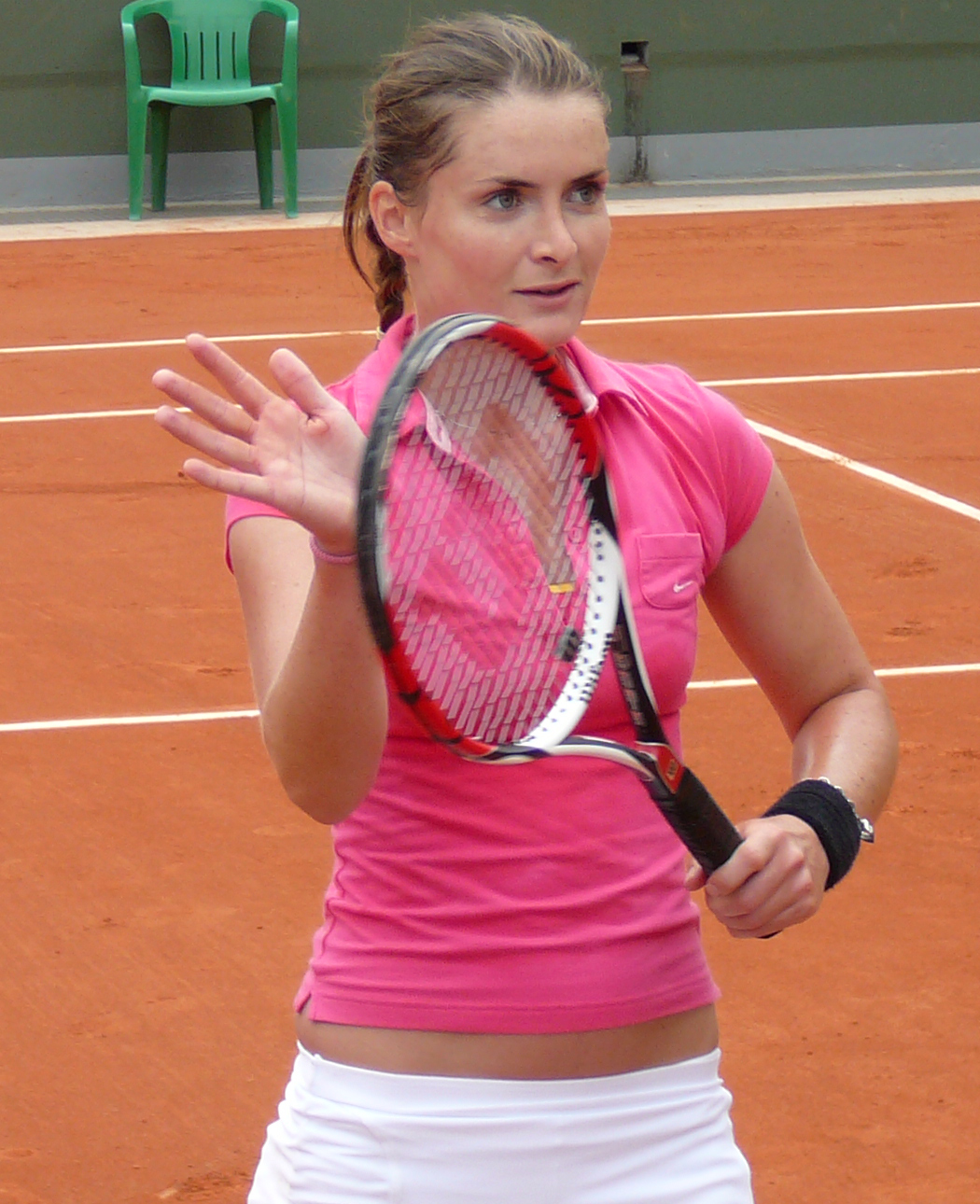
Benešová at the 2008 French Open

=== 2011 ===
Benešová reached the fourth round of the Australian Open, but was defeated by second seed Vera Zvonareva.

Along with Záhlavová-Strýcová, she won four titles in doubles.

At Wimbledon, she won the mixed doubles title with partner and later husband, Jürgen Melzer.

=== 2012 ===
Benešová once again reached the fourth round of the Australian Open, being defeated by eventual champion Victoria Azarenka in straight sets. On 29 April 2012 she won her last title at the Stuttgart doubles, again with Záhlavová-Strýcová.

She paused from playing tournaments until February 2014, mainly due to shoulder problems.

=== 2014 ===
In her first tournament as Iveta Melzer, she and her partner Petra Cetkovská reached the final of the Acapulco doubles which they lost in three sets.

At the French Open, she played the mixed doubles with her then husband Jürgen, they lost in the first round against top seeded Alexander Peya and Abigail Spears. It was their last Grand Slam mixed appearance together; at Wimbledon, Jürgen Melzer partnered Anabel Medina Garrigues.

Iveta Melzer ended her career on 15 August 2014, as shoulder problems prevented her from playing her best tennis.

== Personal life ==
On 14 September 2012, Benešová married Austrian tennis player Jürgen Melzer at Laxenburg castles in Austria. The relationship ended in 2015 and Iveta changed her name back to Benešová.

== Performance timelines ==
Key
| W | F | SF | QF | #R | RR | Q# | P# | DNQ | A | Z# | PO | G | S | B | NMS | NTI | P | NH |

(W) winner; (F) finalist; (SF) semifinalist; (QF) quarterfinalist; (#R) rounds 4, 3, 2, 1; (RR) round-robin stage; (Q#) qualification round; (P#) preliminary round; (DNQ) did not qualify; (A) absent; (Z#) Davis/Fed Cup Zonal Group (with number indication) or (PO) play-off; (G) gold, (S) silver or (B) bronze Olympic/Paralympic medal; (NMS) not a Masters tournament; (NTI) not a Tier I tournament; (P) postponed; (NH) not held; (SR) strike rate (events won / competed); (W–L) win–loss record.
To avoid confusion and double counting, these charts are updated at the conclusion of a tournament or when the player's participation has ended.

Only main-draw results in WTA Tour, Grand Slam tournaments, Fed Cup, Hopman Cup and Olympic Games are included in win–loss records.

=== Singles ===
| Tournament | 2002 | 2003 | 2004 | 2005 | 2006 | 2007 | 2008 | 2009 | 2010 | 2011 | 2012 | 2013 | 2014 | SR | W–L | Win% |
|---|---|---|---|---|---|---|---|---|---|---|---|---|---|---|---|---|
Grand Slam tournaments
| Australian Open | Q2 | 1R | Q3 | 1R | 3R | 2R | Q2 | 2R | 2R | 4R | 4R | A | A | 0 / 8 | 11–8 | 58% |
| French Open | 2R | 1R | 1R | 2R | 2R | 1R | 3R | 3R | 1R | 1R | 1R | A | 1R | 0 / 12 | 7–12 | 37% |
| Wimbledon | 1R | 1R | 1R | 1R | 1R | 2R | 1R | 2R | 1R | 2R | 1R | A | A | 0 / 11 | 3–11 | 21% |
| US Open | 1R | 1R | 2R | 1R | 1R | 1R | 2R | 1R | 2R | 1R | 1R | A | A | 0 / 11 | 3–11 | 21% |
| Win–Loss | 1–3 | 0–4 | 1–3 | 1–4 | 3–4 | 2–4 | 3–3 | 4–4 | 2–4 | 4–4 | 3–4 | 0–0 | 0–1 | 0 / 42 | 24–42 | 36% |
National representation
| Summer Olympics | Not Held | | 1R | Not Held | | | 2R | Not Held | | | A | NH | | 0 / 2 | 1–2 | 33% |
WTA Premier Mandatory & 5 + former^{†} tournaments
| Qatar Open | Not Tier I | | | | | | A | Not Held | | NTI | 2R | NTI | A | 0 / 1 | 1–1 | 25% |
| Dubai Championships | Not Tier I | | | | | | | A | 1R | 1R | NTI | A | NTI | 0 / 2 | 0–2 | 25% |
| Indian Wells Open | A | 2R | 3R | 3R | 2R | 2R | 1R | 2R | 1R | 2R | 1R | A | 1R | 0 / 11 | 6–11 | 35% |
| Miami Open | A | 1R | A | 1R | 2R | 2R | A | QF | 1R | 3R | 3R | A | 1R | 0 / 9 | 9–9 | 50% |
| Madrid Open | Not Held | | | | | | | 1R | 1R | 2R | 1R | A | A | 0 / 4 | 1–4 | 14% |
| Italian Open | A | Q2 | Q2 | A | A | Q1 | 2R | A | A | 2R | 2R | A | A | 0 / 3 | 3–3 | 50% |
| Canadian Open | A | A | A | A | A | Q2 | A | 1R | 3R | 2R | Q3 | A | A | 0 / 3 | 3–3 | 50% |
| Cincinnati Open | Not Held | | Not Tier I | | | | | 1R | A | 1R | Q1 | A | A | 0 / 2 | 0–2 | 0% |
| China Open | Not Held | | Not Tier I | | | | | 1R | A | 1R | A | A | A | 0 / 2 | 0–2 | 0% |
| Berlin Open^{†} | A | A | A | 1R | 1R | A | A | Not Held | | | | | | 0 / 2 | 0–2 | 0% |
| Charleston Open^{†} | A | A | A | 3R | 1R | A | A | Not Tier I | | | | | | 0 / 2 | 2–2 | 50% |
| San Diego Open^{†} | Not Tier I | | 2R | 2R | A | A | Not Held | | Not Tier I | | | | NH | 0 / 2 | 2–2 | 50% |
| Pan Pacific Open^{†} | A | A | A | QF | Q2 | A | A | QF | 1R | 3R | A | A | NTI | 0 / 4 | 7–4 | 64% |
| Kremlin Cup^{†} | Q2 | Q2 | Q2 | 1R | 2R | Q1 | A | Not Tier I | | | | | | 0 / 2 | 1–2 | 33% |
| Zurich Open^{†} | A | Q1 | Q2 | Q2 | A | A | NTI | Not Held | | | | | | 0 / 0 | 0–0 | – |
| Win–Loss | 0–0 | 1–2 | 3–2 | 6–7 | 2–5 | 2–2 | 1–2 | 6–7 | 2–6 | 8–9 | 4–5 | 0–0 | 0–2 | 0 / 49 | 35–49 | 42% |
Career statistics
| | 2002 | 2003 | 2004 | 2005 | 2006 | 2007 | 2008 | 2009 | 2010 | 2011 | 2012 | 2013 | 2014 | SR | W–L | Win% |
| Tournaments | 9 | 19 | 22 | 27 | 21 | 15 | 18 | 25 | 25 | 24 | 17 | 0 | 5 | Career total: 227 | | |
| Titles | 0 | 0 | 1 | 0 | 0 | 0 | 0 | 0 | 1 | 0 | 0 | 0 | 0 | Career total: 2 | | |
| Finals | 1 | 0 | 3 | 0 | 1 | 0 | 1 | 1 | 1 | 0 | 0 | 0 | 0 | Career total: 8 | | |
| Hard Win–Loss | 4–2 | 4–7 | 11–13 | 13–16 | 11–12 | 4–7 | 9–8 | 16–15 | 10–14 | 12–15 | 10–9 | 0–0 | 0–3 | 0 / 118 | 104–121 | 46% |
| Clay Win–Loss | 3–6 | 4–10 | 14–6 | 6–7 | 4–7 | 1–9 | 13–8 | 11–8 | 8–8 | 2–7 | 1–5 | 0–0 | 0–2 | 2 / 81 | 67–83 | 45% |
| Grass Win–Loss | 0–1 | 0–2 | 0–1 | 0–2 | 1–2 | 1–1 | 0–2 | 2–2 | 0–1 | 1–1 | 0–3 | 0–0 | 0–0 | 0 / 18 | 5–18 | 22% |
| Carpet Win–Loss | 1–1 | 1–2 | 0–0 | 2–3 | 1–1 | 0–0 | 0–0 | 0–2 | 0–1 | 0–1 | 0–0 | 0–0 | 0–0 | 0 / 10 | 5–11 | 31% |
| Overall Win–Loss | 8–10 | 9–21 | 25–20 | 21–28 | 17–22 | 6–17 | 22–18 | 29–27 | 18–24 | 15–24 | 11–17 | 0–0 | 0–5 | 2 / 227 | 181–233 | 44% |
| Win % | 44% | 30% | 56% | 43% | 44% | 26% | 55% | 52% | 43% | 38% | 39% | – | 0% | Career total: 44% | | |
| Year-end ranking | 81 | 140 | 36 | 54 | 60 | 119 | 43 | 39 | 60 | 54 | 81 | | | $3,329,488 | | |

=== Doubles ===
| Tournament | 2002 | 2003 | 2004 | 2005 | 2006 | 2007 | 2008 | 2009 | 2010 | 2011 | 2012 | 2013 | 2014 | SR | W–L | Win% |
|---|---|---|---|---|---|---|---|---|---|---|---|---|---|---|---|---|
Grand Slam tournaments
| Australian Open | A | A | 1R | 1R | 1R | 1R | 3R | 2R | 2R | 3R | 2R | A | A | 0 / 9 | 7–9 | 44% |
| French Open | A | A | 1R | 3R | 3R | 1R | 1R | 2R | 3R | 1R | 1R | A | 1R | 0 / 10 | 7–10 | 41% |
| Wimbledon | A | A | 1R | 1R | 2R | 1R | 2R | 3R | 3R | 3R | 2R | A | A | 0 / 9 | 9–9 | 50% |
| US Open | A | A | 2R | 1R | 1R | 2R | 2R | 2R | 3R | QF | 2R | A | A | 0 / 9 | 10–9 | 53% |
| Win–Loss | 0–0 | 0–0 | 1–4 | 2–4 | 3–4 | 1–4 | 4–4 | 5–4 | 7–4 | 7–4 | 3–4 | 0–0 | 0–1 | 0 / 37 | 33–37 | 47% |
National representation
| Summer Olympics | Not Held | | A | Not Held | | | 1R | Not Held | | | A | Not Held | | 0 / 1 | 0–1 | 0% |
WTA Premier Mandatory & 5 + former^{†} tournaments
| Qatar Open | Not Tier I | | | | | | A | Not Held | | NTI | 2R | A | A | 0 / 1 | 1–1 | 25% |
| Dubai Championships | Not Tier I | | | | | | | A | 1R | 1R | Not Tier I | | | 0 / 2 | 0–2 | 25% |
| Indian Wells Open | A | A | 1R | 1R | SF | 2R | QF | QF | QF | 2R | SF | A | 1R | 0 / 10 | 13–10 | 57% |
| Miami Open | A | A | A | 1R | 2R | A | A | 1R | 1R | 2R | 1R | A | 2R | 0 / 7 | 3–7 | 30% |
| Madrid Open | Not Held | | | | | | | A | 1R | 1R | 1R | A | A | 0 / 3 | 0–3 | 25% |
| Italian Open | A | A | A | A | A | QF | F | A | A | 2R | 2R | A | A | 0 / 4 | 8–4 | 67% |
| Canadian Open | A | A | A | A | A | 2R | A | QF | QF | 1R | 1R | A | A | 0 / 5 | 5–5 | 50% |
| Cincinnati Open | Not Held | | Not Tier I | | | | | 1R | A | 1R | 1R | A | A | 0 / 3 | 0–3 | 0% |
| China Open | Not Held | | Not Tier I | | | | | 1R | A | 2R | A | A | A | 0 / 2 | 1–2 | 33% |
| Berlin Open^{†} | A | A | 1R | 1R | QF | A | A | Not Held | | | | | | 0 / 3 | 2–3 | 33% |
| Charleston Open^{†} | A | A | A | F | 1R | A | A | Not Tier I | | | | | | 0 / 2 | 4–2 | 67% |
| San Diego Open^{†} | A | A | 1R | 1R | A | A | Not Held | | Not Tier I | | | | NH | 0 / 2 | 0–2 | 0% |
| Pan Pacific Open | A | A | A | A | QF | A | A | A | W | 1R | A | A | A | 1 / 3 | 5–2 | 71% |
| Kremlin Cup^{†} | A | 2R | 1R | 1R | F | SF | A | Not Tier I | | | | | | 0 / 5 | 6–5 | 55% |
| Zurich Open^{†} | A | A | Q1 | 1R | A | NTI | Not Held | | | | | | | 0 / 1 | 0–1 | 0% |
| Win–Loss | 0–0 | 1–1 | 0–4 | 4–7 | 10–6 | 6–4 | 5–2 | 4–5 | 8–5 | 4–9 | 5–7 | 0–0 | 1–2 | 1 / 53 | 48–52 | 48% |
Career statistics
| Tournaments | 5 | 8 | 20 | 26 | 17 | 17 | 20 | 20 | 21 | 22 | 18 | 0 | 4 | Career total: 198 | | |
| Titles | 0 | 0 | 0 | 1 | 0 | 1 | 2 | 1 | 4 | 4 | 1 | 0 | 0 | Career total: 14 | | |
| Finals | 0 | 0 | 1 | 3 | 1 | 2 | 4 | 4 | 5 | 4 | 1 | 0 | 1 | Career total: 26 | | |
| Overall Win–Loss | 2–6 | 5–8 | 14–20 | 22–25 | 18–18 | 20–16 | 24–18 | 29–19 | 32–17 | 32–17 | 18–17 | 0–0 | 4–4 | 14 / 198 | 220–185 | 54% |
| Year-end ranking | 190 | 130 | 63 | 38 | 35 | 34 | 35 | 34 | 21 | 29 | 36 | n/a | | | | |

== Grand Slam tournament finals ==
=== Mixed doubles: 1 (title) ===
| Result | Year | Tournament | Surface | Partner | Opponents | Score |
|---|---|---|---|---|---|---|
| Win | 2011 | Wimbledon | Grass | (Austria) Jürgen Melzer | (India) Mahesh Bhupathi (Russia) Elena Vesnina | 6–3, 6–2 |

== WTA Tour finals ==
=== Singles: 8 (2 titles, 6 runner-ups) ===
Legend
Tier III, IV & V / International (2–6)

| Result | W–L | Date | Tournament | Tier | Surface | Opponent | Score |
|---|---|---|---|---|---|---|---|
| Loss | 0–1 | Oct 2002 | WTA Bratislava, Slovakia | Tier V | Hard (i) | (Slovenia) Maja Matevžič | 0–6, 1–6 |
| Win | 1–1 | Mar 2004 | Mexican Open, Mexico | Tier III | Clay | (Italy) Flavia Pennetta | 7–6^{(7–5)}, 6–4 |
| Loss | 1–2 | Apr 2004 | Portugal Open, Portugal | Tier IV | Clay | (France) Émilie Loit | 5–7, 6–7^{(1–7)} |
| Loss | 1–3 | Aug 2004 | Forest Hills Classic, United States | Tier V | Hard | (Russia) Elena Likhovtseva | 3–6, 2–6 |
| Loss | 1–4 | Jan 2006 | Hobart International, Australia | Tier IV | Hard | (Netherlands) Michaëlla Krajicek | 1–6, 2–6 |
| Loss | 1–5 | May 2008 | Portugal Open, Portugal | Tier IV | Clay | (Russia) Maria Kirilenko | 4–6, 2–6 |
| Loss | 1–6 | Jan 2009 | Hobart International, Australia | International | Hard | (Czech Republic) Petra Kvitová | 5–7, 1–6 |
| Win | 2–6 | May 2010 | Rabat Grand Prix, Morocco | International | Clay | (Romania) Simona Halep | 6–4, 6–2 |

=== Doubles: 26 (14 titles, 12 runner-ups) ===
Legend
Tier I / Premier 5 (1–3)
Tier II / Premier (5–2)
Tier III & IV / International (8–7)

| Result | W–L | Date | Tournament | Tier | Surface | Partner | Opponents | Score |
|---|---|---|---|---|---|---|---|---|
| Loss | 0–1 | Jul 2004 | Silicon Valley Classic, US | Tier II | Hard | (Luxembourg) Claudine Schaul | (Greece) Eleni Daniilidou (Australia) Nicole Pratt | 2–6, 4–6 |
| Win | 1–1 | Feb 2005 | Open GDF Suez, France | Tier II | Carpet (i) | (Czech Republic) Květa Peschke | (Spain) Anabel Medina Garrigues (Russia) Dinara Safina | 6–2, 2–6, 6–2 |
| Loss | 1–2 | Apr 2005 | Charleston Open, US | Tier I | Clay (green) | (Czech Republic) Květa Peschke | (Spain) Conchita Martínez (Spain) Virginia Ruano Pascual | 1–6, 4–6 |
| Loss | 1–3 | Jun 2005 | Rosmalen Championships, Netherlands | Tier III | Grass | (Spain) Nuria Llagostera Vives | (Spain) Anabel Medina Garrigues (Russia) Dinara Safina | 6–4, 2–6, 7–6^{(11–9)} |
| Loss | 1–4 | Oct 2006 | Kremlin Cup, Russia | Tier I | Carpet (i) | (Russia) Galina Voskoboeva | (Italy) Francesca Schiavone (Czech Republic) Květa Peschke | 4–6, 7–6^{(7–4)}, 1–6 |
| Loss | 1–5 | Jan 2007 | Hardcourt Championships, Australia | Tier III | Hard | (Russia) Galina Voskoboeva | (Russia) Dinara Safina (Slovenia) Katarina Srebotnik | 3–6, 4–6 |
| Win | 2–5 | Sep 2007 | Luxembourg Open, Luxembourg | Tier II | Hard (i) | (Slovakia) Janette Husárová | (Belarus) Victoria Azarenka (Israel) Shahar Pe'er | 6–4, 6–2 |
| Win | 3–5 | Feb 2008 | Copa Colsanitas, Colombia | Tier III | Clay | (United States) Bethanie Mattek | (Croatia) Jelena Kostanić Tošić (Germany) Martina Müller | 6–3, 6–3 |
| Loss | 3–6 | Mar 2008 | Mexican Open, Mexico | Tier III | Clay | (Czech Republic) Petra Cetkovská | (Spain) Nuria Llagostera Vives (Spain) María José Martínez Sánchez | 2–6, 4–6 |
| Loss | 3–7 | May 2008 | Italian Open, Italy | Tier I | Clay | (Slovakia) Janette Husárová | (Taiwan) Chuang Chia-jung (Taiwan) Chan Yung-jan | 6–7^{(5–7)}, 3–6 |
| Win | 4–7 | Aug 2008 | Nordic Light Open, Sweden | Tier IV | Hard | (Czech Republic) Barbora Záhlavová-Strýcová | (Czech Republic) Petra Cetkovská (Czech Republic) Lucie Šafářová | 7–5, 6–4 |
| Loss | 4–8 | Mar 2009 | Monterrey Open, Mexico | International | Hard | (Czech Republic) Barbora Záhlavová-Strýcová | (Italy) Mara Santangelo (France) Nathalie Dechy | 3–6, 4–6 |
| Loss | 4–9 | Jul 2009 | Prague Open, Czech Republic | International | Clay | (Czech Republic) Barbora Záhlavová-Strýcová | (Ukraine) Kateryna Bondarenko (Ukraine) Alona Bondarenko | 1–6, 2–6 |
| Loss | 4–10 | Aug 2009 | Connecticut Open, United States | Premier | Hard | (Czech Republic) Lucie Hradecká | (Spain) Nuria Llagostera Vives (Spain) María José Martínez Sánchez | 2–6, 6–7 |
| Win | 5–10 | Oct 2009 | Luxembourg Open, Luxembourg (2) | International | Hard (i) | (Czech Republic) Barbora Záhlavová-Strýcová | (Czech Republic) Vladimíra Uhlířová (Czech Republic) Renata Voráčová | 6–1, 0–6, [10–7] |
| Win | 6–10 | Feb 2010 | Open GDF Suez, France (2) | Premier | Hard (i) | (Czech Republic) Barbora Záhlavová-Strýcová | (Zimbabwe) Cara Black (United States) Liezel Huber | walkover |
| Win | 7–10 | Mar 2010 | Monterrey Open, Mexico | International | Hard | (Czech Republic) Barbora Záhlavová-Strýcová | (Germany) Anna-Lena Grönefeld (United States) Vania King | 3–6, 6–4, [10–8] |
| Win | 8–10 | May 2010 | Rabat Grand Prix, Morocco | International | Clay | (Spain) Anabel Medina Garrigues | (Czech Republic) Lucie Hradecká (Czech Republic) Renata Voráčová | 6–3, 6–1 |
| Win | 9–10 | Oct 2010 | Pan Pacific Open, Japan | Premier 5 | Hard | (Czech Republic) Barbora Záhlavová-Strýcová | (Israel) Shahar Pe'er (China) Peng Shuai | 6–4, 4–6, [10–8] |
| Loss | 9–11 | Oct 2010 | Luxembourg Open, Luxembourg | International | Hard (i) | (Czech Republic) Barbora Záhlavová-Strýcová | (Switzerland) Timea Bacsinszky (Italy) Tathiana Garbin | 4–6, 4–6 |
| Win | 10–11 | Jan 2011 | Sydney International, Australia | Premier | Hard | (Czech Republic) Barbora Záhlavová-Strýcová | (Czech Republic) Květa Peschke (Slovenia) Katarina Srebotnik | 4–6, 6–4, [10–7] |
| Win | 11–11 | Mar 2011 | Monterrey Open, Mexico (2) | International | Hard | (Czech Republic) Barbora Záhlavová-Strýcová | (Germany) Anna-Lena Grönefeld (United States) Vania King | 6–7^{(8–10)}, 6–2, [10–6] |
| Win | 12–11 | May 2011 | Barcelona Open, Spain | International | Clay | (Czech Republic) Barbora Záhlavová-Strýcová | (South Africa) Natalie Grandin (Czech Republic) Vladimíra Uhlířová | 5–7, 6–4, [11–9] |
| Win | 13–11 | Oct 2011 | Luxembourg Open, Luxembourg (3) | International | Hard (i) | (Czech Republic) Barbora Záhlavová-Strýcová | (Czech Republic) Lucie Hradecká (Russia) Ekaterina Makarova | 7–5, 6–3 |
| Win | 14–11 | Apr 2012 | Stuttgart Open, Germany | Premier | Clay (i) | (Czech Republic) Barbora Záhlavová-Strýcová | (Germany) Julia Görges (Germany) Anna-Lena Grönefeld | 6–4, 7–5 |
| Loss | 14–12 | Mar 2014 | Mexican Open, Mexico | International | Hard | (Czech Republic) Petra Cetkovská | (France) Kristina Mladenovic (Kazakhstan) Galina Voskoboeva | 3–6, 6–2, [5–10] |

== ITF Circuit finals ==
=== Singles: 5 (4 titles, 1 runner-up) ===
Legend
75K tournaments
50K tournaments
25K tournaments
10K tournaments

| Result | W–L | Date | Tournament | Tier | Surface | Opponent | Score |
|---|---|---|---|---|---|---|---|
| Win | 1–0 | May 2001 | ITF Prešov, Slovakia | 10K | Clay | (Slovakia) Michala Bzduseková | 3–6, 6–2, 6–2 |
| Win | 2–0 | Oct 2001 | ITF Opole, Poland | 25K | Carpet (i) | (Slovakia) Eva Fislová | 6–1, 6–3 |
| Win | 3–0 | Feb 2004 | ITF Ortisei, Italy | 75K | Carpet (i) | (Hungary) Virág Németh | 6–3, 6–1 |
| Win | 4–0 | Mar 2008 | ITF Latina, Italy | 50K | Clay | (Bulgaria) Sesil Karatantcheva | 6–0, 6–2 |
| Loss | 4–1 | Apr 2008 | ITF Torhout, Belgium | 75K | Hard (i) | (United Kingdom) Elena Baltacha | 7–6^{(5)}, 1–6, 4–6 |

=== Doubles: 8 (4 titles, 4 runner-ups) ===
Legend
75K tournaments
50K tournaments
25K tournaments
10K tournaments

| Result | W–L | Date | Tournament | Tier | Surface | Partner | Opponents | Score |
|---|---|---|---|---|---|---|---|---|
| Win | 1–0 | Jul 2000 | Bella Cup, Poland | 10K | Clay | (Czech Republic) Lenka Novotná | (Czech Republic) Gabriela Chmelinová (Czech Republic) Jana Macurová | 6–1, 6–4 |
| Loss | 1–1 | Dec 2000 | ITF Mallorca, Spain | 10K | Clay | (Czech Republic) Lenka Novotná | (Czech Republic) Olga Vymetálková (Czech Republic) Gabriela Chmelinová | 3–5, 4–2, 4–0, 1–4, 2–4 |
| Win | 2–1 | Mar 2001 | ITF Rome, Italy | 10K | Clay | (Slovakia) Zuzana Kučová | (Italy) Claudia Ivone (Italy) Roberta Vinci | 4–6, 6–4, 6–4 |
| Win | 3–1 | May 2001 | ITF Szczecin, Poland | 10K | Clay | (Slovakia) Martina Babáková | (Russia) Anastassia Belova (Belarus) Darya Kustova | 6–4, 7–6^{(4)} |
| Loss | 3–2 | Apr 2002 | Open de Cagnes-sur-Mer, France | 50K | Clay | (France) Caroline Dhenin | (Madagascar) Dally Randriantefy (France) Stéphanie Cohen-Aloro | 2–6, 4–6 |
| Loss | 3–3 | Sep 2003 | ITF Bordeaux, France | 75K | Clay | (Czech Republic) Olga Vymetálková | (Estonia) Maret Ani (Czech Republic) Libuše Průšová | 3–6, 4–6 |
| Loss | 3–4 | Dec 2003 | ITF Ostrava, Czech Republic | 25K | Carpet (i) | (Czech Republic) Michaela Paštiková | (Czech Republic) Libuše Průšová (Czech Republic) Barbora Strýcová | 2–6, 4–6 |
| Win | 4–4 | Dec 2003 | ITF Valašské Meziříčí, Czech Republic | 25K | Hard (i) | (Czech Republic) Michaela Paštiková | (Estonia) Maret Ani (Czech Republic) Libuše Průšová | w/o |

== Wins against top 10 players ==
| No. | Player | Rk | Event | Surface | Rd | Score | Rk | Years | Ref |
|---|---|---|---|---|---|---|---|---|---|
| 1 | (Russia) Vera Zvonareva | 10 | Charleston Open, United States | Clay (g) | 2R | 6–4, 4–6, 7–5 | 51 | 2005 | |
| 2 | (France) Mary Pierce | 5 | Australian Open, Australia | Hard | 2R | 6–3, 7–5 | 42 | 2006 | |
| 3 | (Serbia) Jelena Janković | 3 | Canadian Open, Canada | Hard | 2R | 7–6^{(7–3)}, 6–3 | 75 | 2010 | |
| 4 | (Australia) Samantha Stosur | 6 | Brisbane International, Australia | Hard | 2R | 6–4, 6–2 | 54 | 2012 | |

- Key: (Rk) first use, opponent rank; (Rd) round; (Rk) 2nd use, player rank; (Ref) reference; (F) final; (SF) semifinal; (QF) quarterfinal; (#R) rounds 4, 3, 2, 1; (RR) round-robin stage; (Q#) qualifying rounds or stages (3), 2, 1.
