= Monterrey Open =

Coordinates: 25°37′0″N 100°18′19″W

WTA Tour
- Founded: 2009
- Location: Monterrey, Nuevo León; Mexico
- Venue: Club Sonoma
- Category: WTA 500 (2024-present); WTA 250 (2021-2023)
- Surface: Hard - outdoors
- Draw: 28S / 16Q / 16D
- Prize money: US$1,206,446 (2026)
- Website: abiertognpseguros.com

Current champions (2026)
- Singles: (France) Diane Parry
- Doubles: (Australia) Maya Joint (China) Xu Yifan

The Monterrey Open (Spanish: Torneo de Monterrey), known as the Abierto GNP Seguros for sponsorship reasons, is a professional WTA 500 tennis tournament played on outdoor hardcourts in Monterrey, Mexico. From 2009 to 2013, the tournament was held in the Sierra Madre Tennis Club and since 2014 the tournament is currently held at the Club Sonoma.

== Finals ==
=== Singles ===
Year	Champion	Runner-up	Score
2009	(France) Marion Bartoli	(China) Li Na	6–4, 6–3
2010	(Russia) Anastasia Pavlyuchenkova	(Slovakia) Daniela Hantuchová	1–6, 6–1, 6–0
2011	(Russia) Anastasia Pavlyuchenkova (2)	(Serbia) Jelena Janković	2–6, 6–2, 6–3
2012	(Hungary) Tímea Babos	(Romania) Alexandra Cadanțu	6–4, 6–4
2013	(Russia) Anastasia Pavlyuchenkova (3)	(Germany) Angelique Kerber	4–6, 6–2, 6–4
2014	(Serbia) Ana Ivanovic	(Serbia) Jovana Jakšić	6–2, 6–1
2015	(Switzerland) Timea Bacsinszky	(France) Caroline Garcia	4–6, 6–2, 6–4
2016	(United Kingdom) Heather Watson	(Belgium) Kirsten Flipkens	3–6, 6–2, 6–3
2017	(Russia) Anastasia Pavlyuchenkova (4)	(Germany) Angelique Kerber	6–4, 2–6, 6–1
2018	(Spain) Garbiñe Muguruza	(Hungary) Tímea Babos	3–6, 6–4, 6–3
2019	(Spain) Garbiñe Muguruza (2)	(Belarus) Victoria Azarenka	6–1, 3–1 ret.
2020	(Ukraine) Elina Svitolina	(Czech Republic) Marie Bouzková	7–5, 4–6, 6–4
↓ WTA 250 tournament ↓
2021	(Canada) Leylah Fernandez	(Switzerland) Viktorija Golubic	6–1, 6–4
2022	(Canada) Leylah Fernandez (2)	(Colombia) Camila Osorio	6–7^{(5–7)}, 6–4, 7–6^{(7–3)}
2023	(Croatia) Donna Vekić	(France) Caroline Garcia	6–4, 3–6, 7–5
↓ WTA 500 tournament ↓
2024	(Czech Republic) Linda Nosková	(New Zealand) Lulu Sun	7–6^{(8–6)}, 6–4
2025	Diana Shnaider	Ekaterina Alexandrova	6–3, 4–6, 6–4
2026	(France) Diane Parry	(Belgium) Elise Mertens	6–4, 0–6, 6–3

=== Doubles ===
Year	Champions	Runners-up	Score
2009	(France) Nathalie Dechy (Italy) Mara Santangelo	(Czech Republic) Iveta Benešová (Czech Republic) Barbora Strýcová	6–3, 6–4
2010	(Czech Republic) Iveta Benešová (Czech Republic) Barbora Záhlavová-Strýcová	(Germany) Anna-Lena Grönefeld (United States) Vania King	3–6, 6–4, [10–8]
2011	(Czech Republic) Iveta Benešová (2) (Czech Republic) Barbora Záhlavová-Strýcová (2)	(Germany) Anna-Lena Grönefeld (United States) Vania King	6–7^{(8–10)}, 6–2, [10–6]
2012	(Italy) Sara Errani (Italy) Roberta Vinci	(Japan) Kimiko Date-Krumm (China) Zhang Shuai	6–2, 7–6^{(8–6)}
2013	(Hungary) Tímea Babos (Japan) Kimiko Date-Krumm	(Czech Republic) Eva Birnerová (Thailand) Tamarine Tanasugarn	6–1, 6–4
2014	(Croatia) Darija Jurak (United States) Megan Moulton-Levy	(Hungary) Tímea Babos (Belarus) Olga Govortsova	7–6^{(7–5)}, 3–6, [11–9]
2015	(Canada) Gabriela Dabrowski (Poland) Alicja Rosolska	(Australia) Anastasia Rodionova (Australia) Arina Rodionova	6–3, 2–6, [10–3]
2016	(Spain) Anabel Medina Garrigues (Spain) Arantxa Parra Santonja	(Croatia) Petra Martić (United States) Maria Sanchez	4–6, 7–5, [10–7]
2017	(Japan) Nao Hibino (Poland) Alicja Rosolska (2)	(Slovenia) Dalila Jakupović (Ukraine) Nadiia Kichenok	6–2, 7–6^{(7–4)}
2018	(United Kingdom) Naomi Broady (Spain) Sara Sorribes Tormo	(United States) Desirae Krawczyk (Mexico) Giuliana Olmos	3–6, 6–4, [10–8]
2019	(United States) Asia Muhammad (United States) Maria Sanchez	(Australia) Monique Adamczak (Australia) Jessica Moore	7–6^{(7–2)}, 6–4
2020	(Ukraine) Kateryna Bondarenko (Canada) Sharon Fichman	(Japan) Miyu Kato (China) Wang Yafan	4–6, 6–3, [10–7]
↓ WTA 250 tournament ↓
2021	(United States) Caroline Dolehide (United States) Asia Muhammad (2)	(United Kingdom) Heather Watson (China) Zheng Saisai	6–2, 6–3
2022	(United States) Catherine Harrison (United States) Sabrina Santamaria	(China) Han Xinyun; Yana Sizikova	1–6, 7–5, [10–6]
2023	(Colombia) Yuliana Lizarazo (Colombia) María Paulina Pérez García	(Australia) Kimberly Birrell (Mexico) Fernanda Contreras Gómez	6–3, 5–7, [10–5]
↓ WTA 500 tournament ↓
2024	(China) Guo Hanyu (Romania) Monica Niculescu	(Mexico) Giuliana Olmos; Alexandra Panova	3–6, 6–3, [10–4]
2025	(Spain) Cristina Bucșa (United States) Nicole Melichar-Martinez	(China) Guo Hanyu; Alexandra Panova	6–2, 6–0
2026	(Australia) Maya Joint (China) Xu Yifan	Maria Kozyreva (United Kingdom) Maia Lumsden	6–2, 4–6, [10–5]

== See also ==
- Monterrey Challenger
