= 2023 BNP Paribas Open – Women's doubles =

Women's doubles
- 2023 BNP Paribas Open

Final
- Champions: (Czech Republic) Barbora Krejčíková (Czech Republic) Kateřina Siniaková
- Runners-up: (Brazil) Beatriz Haddad Maia (Germany) Laura Siegemund
- Score: 6–1, 6–7^{(3–7)}, [10–7]

Details
- Draw: 32 (3 WC)
- Seeds: 8

Events
| Singles | men | women |
| Doubles | men | women |
| ← 2022 · | BNP Paribas Open | · 2024 → |

Barbora Krejčíková and Kateřina Siniaková defeated Beatriz Haddad Maia and Laura Siegemund in the final, 6–1, 6–7^{(3–7)}, [10–7], to win the women's doubles tennis title at the 2023 Indian Wells Masters. It was their first title at Indian Wells, third WTA 1000 title, and 15th career WTA Tour doubles title together.

Xu Yifan and Yang Zhaoxuan were the defending champions, but lost in the first round to Alexa Guarachi and Erin Routliffe.

== Seeds ==
1. (Czech Republic) Barbora Krejčíková / (Czech Republic) Kateřina Siniaková (champions)
2. (United States) Coco Gauff / (United States) Jessica Pegula (second round)
3. (Ukraine) Lyudmyla Kichenok / (Latvia) Jeļena Ostapenko (second round)
4. (United States) Desirae Krawczyk / (Netherlands) Demi Schuurs (second round)
5. (China) Xu Yifan / (China) Yang Zhaoxuan (first round)
6. (Australia) Storm Hunter / (Belgium) Elise Mertens (quarterfinals)
7. (Mexico) Giuliana Olmos / (China) Zhang Shuai (first round)
8. (United States) Nicole Melichar-Martinez / (Australia) Ellen Perez (second round)

== Draw ==
=== Key ===
- Q = Qualifier
- WC = Wild card
- LL = Lucky loser
- Alt = Alternate
- SE = Special exempt
- PR = Protected ranking
- ITF = ITF entry
- JE = Junior exempt
- w/o = Walkover
- r = Retired
- d = Defaulted
- SR = Special ranking

=== Finals ===
Semifinals
1 | (Czech Republic) Barbora Krejčíková (Czech Republic) Kateřina Siniaková | 6 | 6
(Japan) Shuko Aoyama (Japan) Ena Shibahara | 4 | 2
(Brazil) Beatriz Haddad Maia (Germany) Laura Siegemund | 6 | 6
(Japan) Miyu Kato (Indonesia) Aldila Sutjiadi | 1 | 2

Final
1 | (Czech Republic) Barbora Krejčíková (Czech Republic) Kateřina Siniaková | 6 | 6^{3} | [10]
(Brazil) Beatriz Haddad Maia (Germany) Laura Siegemund | 1 | 7^{7} | [7]

=== Top half ===
First round
1 | (Czech Republic) B Krejčíková (Czech Republic) K Siniaková | 6 | 6
V Kudermetova; L Samsonova | 1 | 2
(Chinese Taipei) H-c Chan (Chinese Taipei) L Chan | 4 | 6^{5}
WC | (Canada) L Fernandez (United States) T Townsend | 6 | 7^{7}
(Hungary) A Bondár (Belgium) K Zimmermann | 2 | 2
WC | (United States) D Collins (United States) P Stearns | 6 | 6
(Spain) P Badosa (Kazakhstan) E Rybakina | 6^{2} | 3
6 | (Australia) S Hunter (Belgium) E Mertens | 7^{7} | 6
4 | (United States) D Krawczyk (Netherlands) D Schuurs | 7 | 6
(Croatia) P Martić (Czech Republic) Ka Plíšková | 5 | 3
(Poland) M Linette (United States) C McNally | 6 | 6
(Romania) M Niculescu (Poland) A Rosolska | 3 | 2
(Norway) U Eikeri (Japan) M Ninomiya | 6^{4} | 4
(Japan) S Aoyama (Japan) E Shibahara | 7^{7} | 6
WC | (Canada) B Andreescu (Kazakhstan) Y Putintseva | 6^{3} | 4
8 | (United States) N Melichar-Martinez (Australia) E Perez | 7^{7} | 6

Second round
1 | (Czech Republic) B Krejčíková (Czech Republic) K Siniaková | 7 | 3 | [10]
WC | (Canada) L Fernandez (United States) T Townsend | 5 | 6 | [7]
WC | (United States) D Collins (United States) P Stearns | 4 | 4
6 | (Australia) S Hunter (Belgium) E Mertens | 6 | 6
4 | (United States) D Krawczyk (Netherlands) D Schuurs | 6 | 1 | [9]
(Poland) M Linette (United States) C McNally | 4 | 6 | [11]
(Japan) S Aoyama (Japan) E Shibahara | 3 | 6 | [10]
8 | (United States) N Melichar-Martinez (Australia) E Perez | 6 | 4 | [8]

Quarterfinals
1 | (Czech Republic) B Krejčíková (Czech Republic) K Siniaková | 6 | 6
6 | (Australia) S Hunter (Belgium) E Mertens | 3 | 3
(Poland) M Linette (United States) C McNally | 4 | 6 | [8]
(Japan) S Aoyama (Japan) E Shibahara | 6 | 3 | [10]

Semifinals
1 | (Czech Republic) B Krejčíková (Czech Republic) K Siniaková | 6 | 6
(Japan) S Aoyama (Japan) E Shibahara | 4 | 2

=== Bottom half ===
First round
7 | (Mexico) G Olmos (China) S Zhang | 4 | 6^{4}
A Panova (United States) A Parks | 6 | 7^{7}
D Kasatkina (Italy) M Trevisan | 2 | 6 | [8]
Alt | (Switzerland) B Bencic (Switzerland) J Teichmann | 6 | 4 | [10]
(Japan) E Hozumi; Y Sizikova | 4 | 1
(Brazil) B Haddad Maia (Germany) L Siegemund | 6 | 6
(Ukraine) M Kostyuk (Romania) E-G Ruse | 2 | 3
3 | (Ukraine) L Kichenok (Latvia) J Ostapenko | 6 | 6
5 | (China) Y Xu (China) Z Yang | 1 | 7^{8} | [7]
(Chile) A Guarachi (New Zealand) E Routliffe | 6 | 6^{6} | [10]
(Canada) G Dabrowski (Brazil) L Stefani | 6 | 6
(Kazakhstan) A Danilina (United States) A Muhammad | 1 | 3
(Belgium) K Flipkens (United States) B Mattek-Sands | 2 | 0
(Japan) M Kato (Indonesia) A Sutjiadi | 6 | 6
(Czech Republic) M Kolodziejová (Czech Republic) M Vondroušová | 6^{5} | 2
2 | (United States) C Gauff (United States) J Pegula | 7^{7} | 6

Second round
A Panova (United States) A Parks | 3 | 3
Alt | (Switzerland) B Bencic (Switzerland) J Teichmann | 6 | 6
(Brazil) B Haddad Maia (Germany) L Siegemund | 6 | 4 | [10]
3 | (Ukraine) L Kichenok (Latvia) J Ostapenko | 1 | 6 | [7]
(Chile) A Guarachi (New Zealand) E Routliffe | 3 | 4
(Canada) G Dabrowski (Brazil) L Stefani | 6 | 6
(Japan) M Kato (Indonesia) A Sutjiadi | 6 | 4 | [12]
2 | (United States) C Gauff (United States) J Pegula | 4 | 6 | [10]

Quarterfinals
Alt | (Switzerland) B Bencic (Switzerland) J Teichmann
(Brazil) B Haddad Maia (Germany) L Siegemund | w/o
(Canada) G Dabrowski (Brazil) L Stefani | 2 | 6^{4}
(Japan) M Kato (Indonesia) A Sutjiadi | 6 | 7^{7}

Semifinals
(Brazil) B Haddad Maia (Germany) L Siegemund | 6 | 6
(Japan) M Kato (Indonesia) A Sutjiadi | 1 | 2

== Seeded teams ==
The following are the seeded teams, based on WTA rankings as of February 27, 2023.

| Country | Player | Country | Player | Rank | Seed |
|---|---|---|---|---|---|
| CZE | Barbora Krejčíková | CZE | Kateřina Siniaková | 3 | 1 |
| USA | Coco Gauff | USA | Jessica Pegula | 8 | 2 |
| UKR | Lyudmyla Kichenok | LAT | Jeļena Ostapenko | 18 | 3 |
| USA | Desirae Krawczyk | NED | Demi Schuurs | 22 | 4 |
| CHN | Xu Yifan | CHN | Yang Zhaoxuan | 25 | 5 |
| AUS | Storm Hunter | BEL | Elise Mertens | 27 | 6 |
| MEX | Giuliana Olmos | CHN | Zhang Shuai | 31 | 7 |
| USA | Nicole Melichar-Martinez | AUS | Ellen Perez | 35 | 8 |

== Other entry information ==
=== Wildcards ===
- (Canada) Bianca Andreescu / (Kazakhstan) Yulia Putintseva
- (United States) Danielle Collins / (United States) Peyton Stearns
- (Canada) Leylah Fernandez / (United States) Taylor Townsend

=== Alternates ===
- (Switzerland) Belinda Bencic / (Switzerland) Jil Teichmann

=== Withdrawals ===
- (United States) Caroline Dolehide / (United States) Madison Keys → replaced by (Switzerland) Belinda Bencic / (Switzerland) Jil Teichmann
