= 2021 Singapore Tennis Open – Doubles =

Doubles
- 2021 Singapore Tennis Open

Final
- Champions: (Belgium) Sander Gillé (Belgium) Joran Vliegen
- Runners-up: (Australia) Matthew Ebden (Australia) John-Patrick Smith
- Score: 6–2, 6–3

Events
| Singles | Doubles |
| Singapore Tennis Open | · 2022 → |

The Singapore Tennis Open was a new addition to the ATP Tour in 2021.

Sander Gillé and Joran Vliegen won the title, defeating Matthew Ebden and John-Patrick Smith in the final, 6–2, 6–3.

== Seeds ==
1. (Belgium) Sander Gillé / (Belgium) Joran Vliegen (champions)
2. (India) Rohan Bopanna / (Japan) Ben McLachlan (first round)
3. (United Kingdom) Luke Bambridge / (United Kingdom) Dominic Inglot (semifinals)
4. (Australia) Matthew Ebden / (Australia) John-Patrick Smith (final)

== Draw ==
=== Key ===
- Q = Qualifier
- WC = Wild card
- LL = Lucky loser
- Alt = Alternate
- SE = Special exempt
- PR = Protected ranking
- ITF = ITF entry
- JE = Junior exempt
- w/o = Walkover
- r = Retired
- d = Defaulted
- SR = Special ranking

=== Draw ===
First round
1 | (Belgium) S Gillé (Belgium) J Vliegen | 7^{7} | 6
(United States) E King (United States) H Reese | 6^{3} | 3
(South Korea) S-w Kwon (Japan) Y Uchiyama
(India) P Raja (India) R Ramanathan | w/o
3 | (United Kingdom) L Bambridge (United Kingdom) D Inglot | 6 | 6
(Germany) Y Hanfmann (Australia) J Millman | 3 | 3
WC | (United States) J Cerretani (Canada) A Shamasdin | 6 | 7
(Kazakhstan) A Bublik (Australia) M Polmans | 1 | 5
(United States) R Galloway (United States) A Lawson | 7 | 6
(Japan) T Daniel (Chinese Taipei) J Jung | 5 | 3
Alt | (United States) T-S Kwiatkowski (United States) C Eubanks | 4 | 2
4 | (Australia) M Ebden (Australia) J-P Smith | 6 | 6
WC | (Singapore) S Alam (Singapore) R Hobbs | 5 | 1
(India) S Balaji (Switzerland) L Margaroli | 7 | 6
(Venezuela) LD Martínez (Spain) D Vega Hernández | 6 | 6
2 | (India) R Bopanna (Japan) B McLachlan | 4 | 2

Quarterfinals
1 | (Belgium) S Gillé (Belgium) J Vliegen | 6 | 7^{7}
(India) P Raja (India) R Ramanathan | 4 | 6^{3}
3 | (United Kingdom) L Bambridge (United Kingdom) D Inglot | 7^{7} | 7^{7}
WC | (United States) J Cerretani (Canada) A Shamasdin | 6^{4} | 6^{1}
(United States) R Galloway (United States) A Lawson | 4 | 6 | [5]
4 | (Australia) M Ebden (Australia) J-P Smith | 6 | 3 | [10]
(India) S Balaji (Switzerland) L Margaroli | 4 | 6 | [10]
(Venezuela) LD Martínez (Spain) D Vega Hernández | 6 | 2 | [12]

Semifinals
1 | (Belgium) S Gillé (Belgium) J Vliegen | 6 | 6
3 | (United Kingdom) L Bambridge (United Kingdom) D Inglot | 4 | 4
4 | (Australia) M Ebden (Australia) J-P Smith | 6 | 6
(Venezuela) LD Martínez (Spain) D Vega Hernández | 4 | 4

Final
1 | (Belgium) S Gillé (Belgium) J Vliegen | 6 | 6
4 | (Australia) M Ebden (Australia) J-P Smith | 2 | 3
