= Matthew Ebden =

Australian tennis player

Matthew Ebden OAM
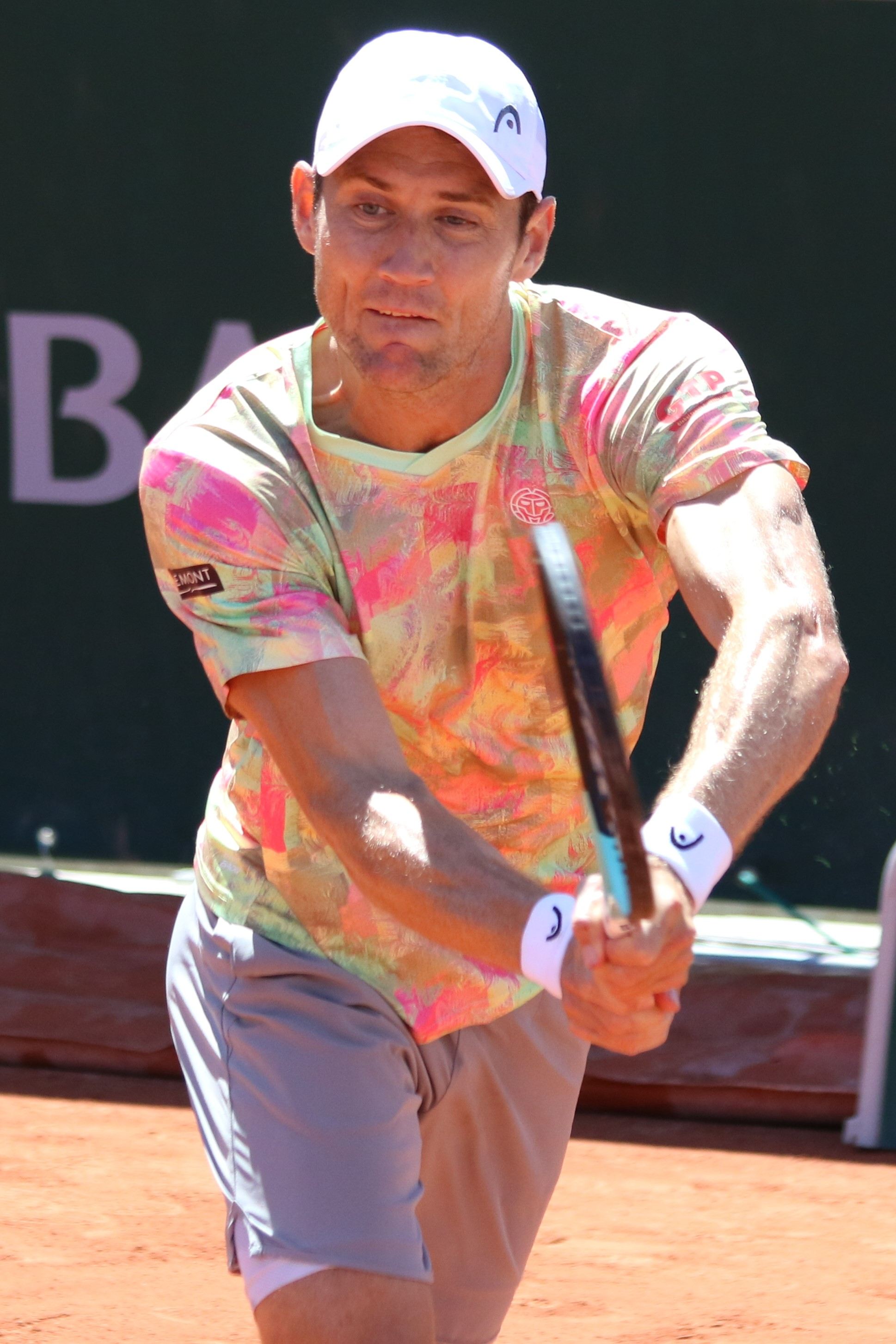
- Ebden at the 2022 French Open
- Country (sports): Australia
- Residence: Perth, Western Australia, Australia
- Born: 26 November 1987 (age 38) Durban, South Africa
- Height: 188 cm (6 ft 2 in)
- Turned pro: 2006
- Retired: 2022 (singles)
- Plays: Right-handed (two-handed backhand)
- Coach: Omar Hejleh
- Prize money: US$ 6,693,080

Singles
- Career record: 79–129
- Career titles: 0
- Highest ranking: No. 39 (22 October 2018)

Grand Slam singles results
- Australian Open: 2R (2012, 2014, 2018, 2019)
- French Open: 1R (2012, 2014, 2018, 2019)
- Wimbledon: 3R (2018)
- US Open: 2R (2012, 2014, 2018)

Other tournaments
- Olympic Games: 1R (2024)

Doubles
- Career record: 218–177
- Career titles: 13
- Highest ranking: No. 1 (26 February 2024)
- Current ranking: No. 40 (16 June 2025)

Grand Slam doubles results
- Australian Open: W (2024)
- French Open: SF (2024)
- Wimbledon: W (2022)
- US Open: F (2023)

Other doubles tournaments
- Tour Finals: SF (2023)
- Olympic Games: W (2024)

Grand Slam mixed doubles results
- Australian Open: W (2013)
- French Open: QF (2022, 2024)
- Wimbledon: F (2022)
- US Open: QF (2022, 2024)

Other mixed doubles tournaments
- Olympic Games: QF (2024)
Medal record
Olympic Games
Gold medal – first place	2024 Paris	Men's doubles
Commonwealth Games
Bronze medal – third place	2010 Delhi	Singles
- Last updated on: 16 June 2025.

Matthew Ebden (born 26 November 1987) is an Australian professional tennis player who reached a career high of world No. 1 in doubles. Ebden is a three-time Grand Slam champion, having won the 2022 Wimbledon Championships and 2024 Australian Open in doubles with Max Purcell and Rohan Bopanna respectively, and the 2013 Australian Open in mixed doubles alongside Jarmila Gajdošová. Ebden won an Olympic gold medal at the 2024 Paris Olympics with John Peers.

Ebden also finished runner-up at the 2022 Australian Open and 2023 US Open in men's doubles with Purcell and Bopanna respectively, and the 2021 Australian Open and 2022 Wimbledon Championships in mixed doubles partnering Samantha Stosur. He became world No. 1 for the first time in February 2024, the first Australian to top the doubles rankings since Todd Woodbridge in 2001, and has won 13 doubles titles on the ATP Tour, including the 2023 Indian Wells Masters and 2024 Miami Open.

In singles, Ebden reached his highest ranking of world No. 39 in October 2018, and finished runner-up at the 2017 Hall of Fame Championships. He achieved his best major result at the 2018 Wimbledon Championships, reaching the third round. Ebden has represented Australia in the Davis Cup since 2012, and won the bronze medal in singles at the 2010 Commonwealth Games.

== Personal life ==
Ebden was born in Durban, South Africa to Charles and Ann Ebden. He attended Hale School in Wembley Downs. Ebden is currently studying for a commerce degree while playing tennis professionally full-time. In Perth, Ebden plays State Grade for Wembley Downs Tennis Club as the number one player in the Tennis West State League. He married Kim Doig, a lawyer, on 16 November 2012, in Margaret River, Western Australia. Ebden became a father in February 2022 when his son was born. Ebden is a member of the Sorrento and Wembley Down Tennis Clubs in Perth.

== Career ==
Ebden spent much of his early career on the futures tour attempting to improve his ranking. It was not until the end of 2009 that Ebden had consistent results on the futures tour after making the final of the last four tournaments he entered in 2009, taking out three of the four titles.

=== Early career ===
In January 2007, Ebden competed in the qualifying tournament for the Australian Open. He defeated Richard Bloomfield of Great Britain in the first round of qualifying 6–3, 5–7, 8–6. He was defeated in the following round 2–6, 4–6 to Serbian player Ilija Bozoljac. Ebden won his first Futures event at the USA F21 event which began in August 2007. He defeated American Michael Yani in the final 3–6, 6–1, 7–5. Ebden played in the qualifying event for the Australian Open for the second year in a row in January 2008. He lost to Flavio Cipolla of Italy in his first match 3–6, 6–4, 3–6. Ebden won his second Futures tournament at the Korea F2 event beginning in May 2008. He defeated Toshihide Matsui of Japan in the final 6–4, 7–5. For the third year running, Ebden participated in the qualifying event for the Australian Open in January 2009. He won his first match against Italian Giancarlo Petrazzuolo 6–3, 6–3. He lost to Michael Berrer of Germany in his following match 4–6, 6–3, 1–6. In October 2009, Ebden won his third Futures event at Australia F8. He defeated British player Jamie Baker in the final 6–2, 6–4. He was also triumphant in his next tournament, Australia F9, which began in November 2009. He won 6–3, 6–4 in the final against fellow Australian John Millman. At Australia F11, which began in November 2009, Ebden won his fifth Futures title. He defeated fellow Australian James Lemke 6–1, 6–1 in the final.

=== 2010 ===
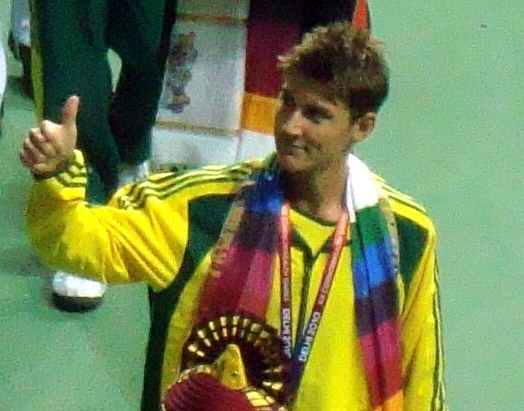
Ebden won the bronze medal at the 2010 Commonwealth Games

Ebden began 2010 by qualifying for the Brisbane International defeating Marinko Matosevic, another Australian, 6–2, 6–2. In the main draw, he was drawn against sixth seed and world number 28 Jürgen Melzer of Austria in the first round and caused a huge upset by winning in straight sets 7–5, 6–1. He was then defeated in the second round by Richard Gasquet 6–3, 6–4. At the Australian Open, he qualified defeating Michał Przysiężny In the final round of qualification 7–5, 6–2, He lost in the first round to world number 12 Gaël Monfils 4–6, 4–6, 4–6. He mainly played in the challenger circuit and reached the final of the Japan Indoor Tennis Championships losing to Yūichi Sugita 4–6, 6–4, 6–1. He then entered the qualifying draws of Roland Garros and Wimbledon and lost in the first round to Yuri Schukin 4–6, 4–6 and qualifying round to Taylor Dent 6–4, 6–7^{(1–8)}, 6–7^{(8–10)}, 3–6, respectively. At the US Open he lost Nicolas Mahut 3–6, 2–6 in the first round of the qualifying draw. Ebden represented Australia at the Commonwealth Games, he advanced to the semifinals defeating Patrick Ogier, Aisam-ul-Haq Qureshi of Pakistan 6–4, 7–5, and Joshua Goodall, but lost to number one seed Somdev Devvarman 3–6, 1–6. Edben ended up winning the bronze medal by beating fellow Australian and second seed Peter Luczak in straight sets 6–3, 6–3 in the third place play-off. Ebden won his sixth Futures event at Great Britain F16, defeating Britain's Daniel Evans 6–2, 3–6, 6–3. Ebden participated in the Australian Open Playoffs for a chance into the maindraw of the 2011 Australian Open. Ebden was the 4th seed. He defeated Benjamin Mitchell and Samuel Groth. This put Ebden in the final 4 of the tournament. He lost his semi final match to Peter Luczak 6–2, 1–6, 6–7.

=== 2011: Breakthrough and first Masters quarterfinal ===
Ebden began 2011 in a similar fashion to 2010 by being entered in the qualifying draw for the Brisbane International and qualified. In the first round of the main draw he was drawn against another Australian wildcard John Millman and won in three sets 4–6, 6–2, 6–4. His second round match was against world number 40 and eighth seed Denis Istomin and produced a huge upset by winning 6–4, 6–4 despite being 156 places below Istomin in the ATP rankings. He was eventually defeated in the quarterfinals by world number 5 and eventual champion Robin Söderling 3–6, 2–6. He was then given a wildcard into the main draw of the Medibank International Sydney. He lost to fifth seed Frenchman Richard Gasquet in the first round 4–6, 3–6. The next week, he played in the Australian Open after being given a wildcard into the main draw. He lost in the first round to American Michael Russell 3–6, 2–6, 7–5, 6–7^{(7–9)}. At the BNP Paribas Open was able to qualify to the main draw just to lose to Mischa Zverev. He also qualified for the Aegon Championships, defeating Somdev Devvarman in the first round before losing to world no. 1 Rafael Nadal in the following round. At the Campbell's Hall of Fame Tennis Championships, Ebden caused a major upset in the first round against 4th seed Ryan Sweeting by winning the match 6–4, 6–2. Ebden then followed it up with a three set win over Matthias Bachinger 2–6, 6–4, 6–4. Ebden lost to 6th seed Olivier Rochus 6–7^{(5–7)}, 3–6 in the quarterfinals. Ebden teamed with American Ryan Harrison to win the doubles title. He followed it up with another doubles title at the Atlanta Tennis Championships where he partnered with yet another American Alex Bogomolov Jr. He then competed at the Citi Open and qualified. He won his first match against Rajeev Ram, but lost to Nikolay Davydenko in the second round. At the Rakuten Japan Open Tennis Championships Ebden went through the qualifying stages to get acceptance into the main draw. In the main draw Ebden drew Spaniard Pablo Andújar and progressed to win the match 6–7^{(4–7)}, 6–4, 6–4. Ebden's run came to an end at that stage where he lost to the 3rd seed David Ferrer 6–4, 2–6, 2–6. At the Shanghai Rolex Masters, Ebden was the 14th seed in the qualifying draw and qualified for the main draw. In the first round Ebden won for the 2nd time in a week 6–4, 6–4 against Pablo Andújar of Spain. Ebden then went on to defeat Ryan Harrison 6–4, 6–2 and then 8th seed and former World No. 6 Gilles Simon 6–2, 2–6, 7–6^{(10–8)}. Ebden eventually lost in straight sets 3–6, 2–6 to the World No. 4, second seed, defending and eventual champion, Andy Murray in the quarterfinals. Because of Ebden's surprise run at the event. he went up to 80 in the world. Ebden ended the year at 86. Ebden also played at a local level in his home state Western Australia, playing for Wembley Downs Tennis Club in the 2011-12 Tennis West State League season and the Asia-Pacific Tennis League, where he went undefeated winning eight singles and doubles matches.

=== 2012: First Grand Slam doubles quarterfinal at the French Open ===
Ebden's first tournament of the year was the Brisbane International. In the first round, Ebden lost to seventh seed Radek Štěpánek in three sets 4–6, 6–3, 3–6. Ebden's next event was the Apia International Sydney where he competed as a wildcard. In the first round, Ebden upset seventh seeded Spaniard, Marcel Granollers in three sets 6–1, 3–6, 6–3 before losing to Marcos Baghdatis 6–3, 5–7, 6–7^{(3–7)} in the second round. Ebden reached the final in doubles with Jarkko Nieminen but lost to the Bryan brothers. Ebden's next event was 2012 Australian Open where he lost in the second round to Kei Nishikori despite leading two sets to love 6–3, 6–1, 4–6, 1–6, 1–6 after defeating João Souza in straight sets. Ebden made his debut for the Australia in Davis Cup against China, Ebden replaced Tomic to play Ya-Nan Ma in a dead rubber where he was victorious 6–4, 6–2. He then played at the SAP Open he was victorious in the first round against Dudi Sela 6–7^{(7–9)}, 6–2, 7–6^{(7–1)}, but lost to Kevin Anderson in the following round in straight sets. He then fell in the qualifying round of the Regions Morgan Keegan Championships and first round of the Delray Beach International Tennis Championships. At the BNP Paribas Open, Ebden entered the qualifying draw and qualified. In the first round, he faced Russian Igor Kunitsyn and won in three sets 6–1, 4–6, 6–4. He backed it up with another three set win over France's Julien Benneteau 2–6, 6–3, 6–2. In the third round he faced world no. 8 Mardy Fish and produced an upset with a straight set win 6–3, 6–4. He fell in the fourth round to John Isner in two tight sets 4–6, 5–7. Ebden then only manage to win one match between Indian Wells and the grass season and this was at the Davis Cup, where he played first live rubber match against Suk-Young Jeong and won the match 6–3, 6–3, 6–4.

Despite reaching the second round of the Queen's Club Championships losing to eventual champion Marin Čilić, Ebden then lost three consecutive first round matches, at the Aegon International as a qualifier, at Wimbledon, and at the Campbell's Hall of Fame Tennis Championships. Ebden then bounced back by reached the quarterfinals of the BB&T Atlanta Open defeating Sergey Bubka and James Blake in three sets, before losing to Gilles Müller. He also won the doubles title with Ryan Harrison. He then reached the second round of the Farmers Classic falling to Xavier Malisse and first round of the Citi Open losing to Rubén Ramírez Hidalgo. Ebden qualified for the Rogers Cup and defeated Peter Polansky 0–6, 6–4, 6–3. He then failed to qualify for the Western & Southern Open and Winston-Salem Open. At the final slam of the year, the US Open, Ebden defeated Tatsuma Ito in straight sets, before losing to Jérémy Chardy in straight sets as well. He reached the second round of Proton Malaysian Open losing to another Frenchman Julien Benneteau. Ebden qualified for the China Open, but lost in the first round to Richard Gasquet. At the Shanghai Rolex Masters, Ebden was defending a quarterfinal, but lost in the first round of the qualifying draw. This results pushed Ebden from 67 to 120 in the rankings. He then made it to back to back second rounds at the Erste Bank Open and Swiss Indoors Basel. Ebden's final match was a loss in the first round of the qualifying draw of the BNP Paribas Masters.

=== 2013: Return to top 100 in singles ===
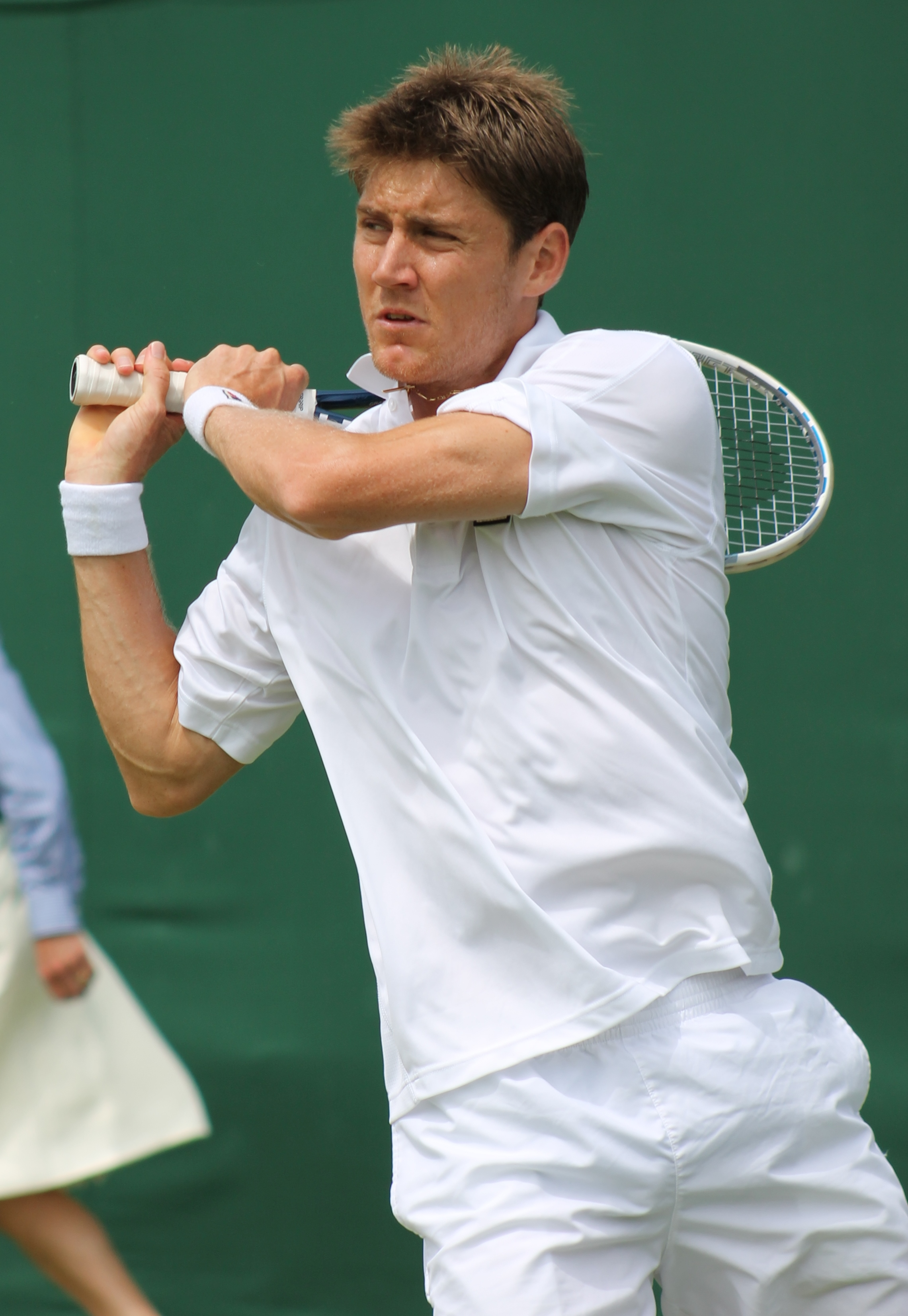
Ebden at the 2013 Wimbledon Championships

Edben started 2013, ranked at world number 105 and began with three first round losses, at the Brisbane International, Apia International Sydney, and a five set loss at the Australian Open to Mikhail Youzhny despite winning the first two sets. However, he won the mixed doubles title with compatriot Jarmila Gajdošová and in doing so, won his first grand slam title and first mixed doubles title. This win made Ebden and Gajdošová the third all Australian pairing to win the Australian Open mixed doubles title and the first since 2005 when Samantha Stosur and Scott Draper won that title. He then competed in tournaments on the American hardcourts. He lost in the second round of the SAP Open, qualifying round of the U.S. National Indoor Tennis Championships, and the first round of the Delray Beach International Tennis Championships. He qualified for the BNP Paribas Open losing to Grigor Dimitrov in the second round and lost in the first round of qualifying at the Sony Open Tennis. This results made his ranking dropped to number 137. Ebden then played on the Challenger circuit and made three consecutive quarterfinals. He then won the first Challenger title of his career at the Aegon Trophy defeating Benjamin Becker in the final. He lost in the first round of singles in the main draw of Wimbledon against Kei Nishikori and the second round of doubles with Jamie Delgado after receiving a wildcard into both events. He went on to lose in the first round of the Hall of Fame Tennis Championships to countryman Lleyton Hewitt. Ebden then reached the second rounds of Claro Open Colombia and BB&T Atlanta Open. At the American Challengers he lost in the finals of the Napa Valley Challenger to Donald Young and at the Tiburon Challenger to Peter Polansky. Ebden then played four Challenger events in Australia and Asia. He won three events at the Melbourne Challenger defeating Tatsuma Ito Keio Challenger defeating Go Soeda and the Dunlop World Challenge defeating Yūichi Sugita. Ebden ended the year at number 68, his highest year-end ranking in his career.

=== 2014 ===
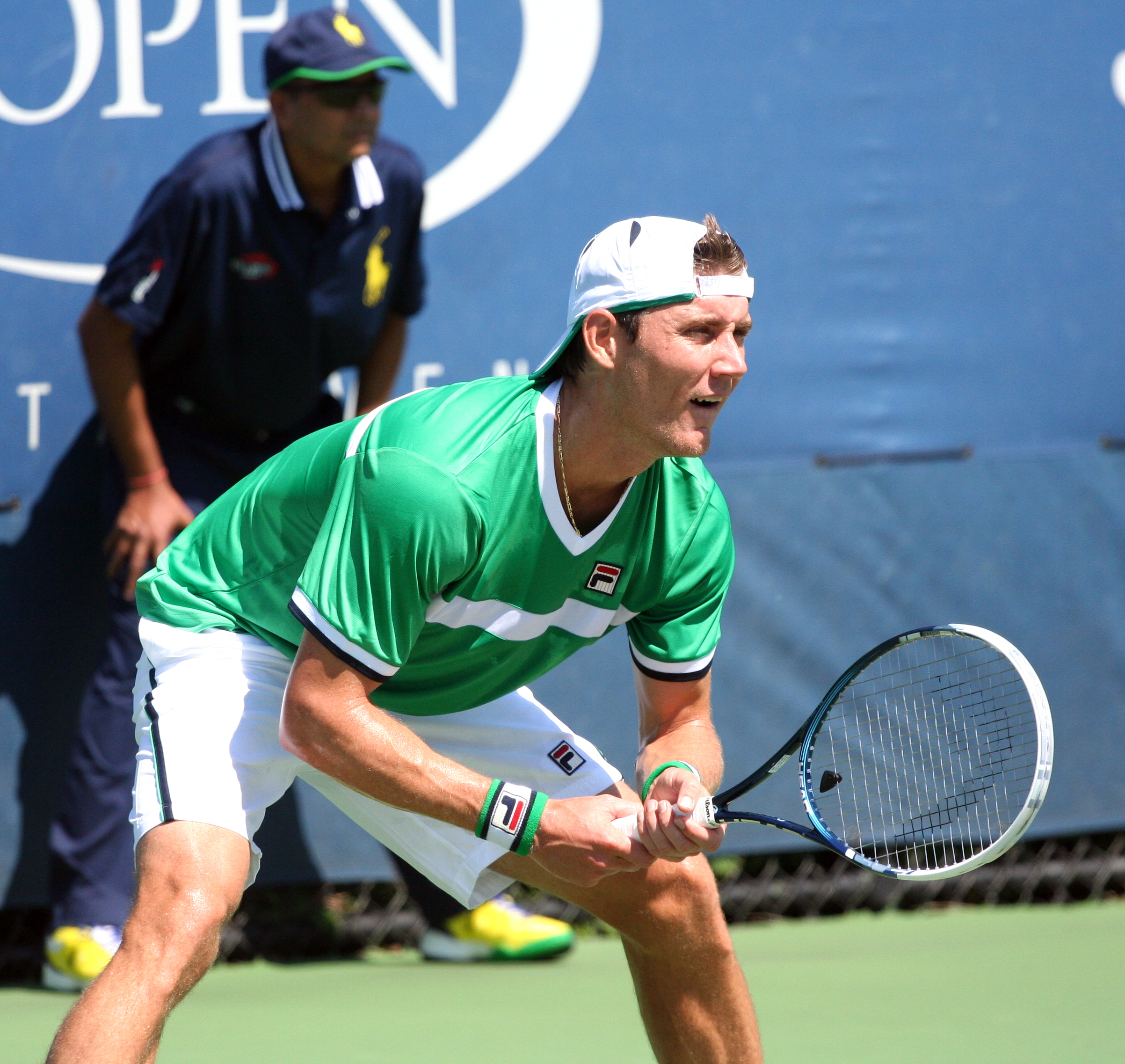
Ebden at the 2014 US Open

Ebden began his year at the 2014 Brisbane International where he won his opening round over Alex Kuznetsov after Nick Kyrgios had to withdraw with a shoulder injury. Ebden lost in the second round against second seed Kei Nishikori. He was also awarded a wildcard into the 2014 Apia International Sydney where he lost against Julien Benneteau in the first round. Ebden will then take part in the 2014 Australian Open as a direct entry. Defeated Nicolas Mahut in R1 of the 2014 Australian Open in 5 sets before losing to Vasek Pospisil in 4 sets on Rod Laver Arena. Ebden then lost in the first round at ATP tour events in Memphis, Delray Beach, Acapulco and Indian Wells. He had better success in doubles at Acapulco where he partnered Kevin Anderson and the pair won the title. It was Ebden's first ATP tour 500 doubles title. Ebden then played at the Miami Masters and defeated Łukasz Kubot in the first round before losing to world number 6 Andy Murray in 3 sets.

Ebden then started his clay court season with a string of first round losses at ATP tournaments. Firstly in Houston where he lost to eventual semi-finalist Santiago Giraldo and in Bucharest where he again lost to an eventual semi-finalist which was Robin Haase. He then contested the Portugal Open where he lost to Somdev Devvarman. Following this, he played in Nice where he lost to defending champion and eventual semi-finalist Albert Montañés. At the French Open, Ebden lost in round 1 to Pablo Cuevas in straight sets

Ebden played his first tournament on grass in London where he lost to Lukáš Lacko. Following this he played at the Topshelf Open where he defeated Adrian Mannarino before losing to 3rd seed and eventual champion Roberto Bautista Agut. Ebden then played at Wimbledon where he drew World number 9 and eventual semi-finalist Milos Raonic. He lost in straight sets.

He contested the US Open where he defeated Tobias Kamke in the first round before losing to 26th seed Leonardo Mayer. Following a string of first round losses and injuries, Ebden finished the year ranked No. 231 in the world in singles and No. 89 in doubles.

=== 2015 ===
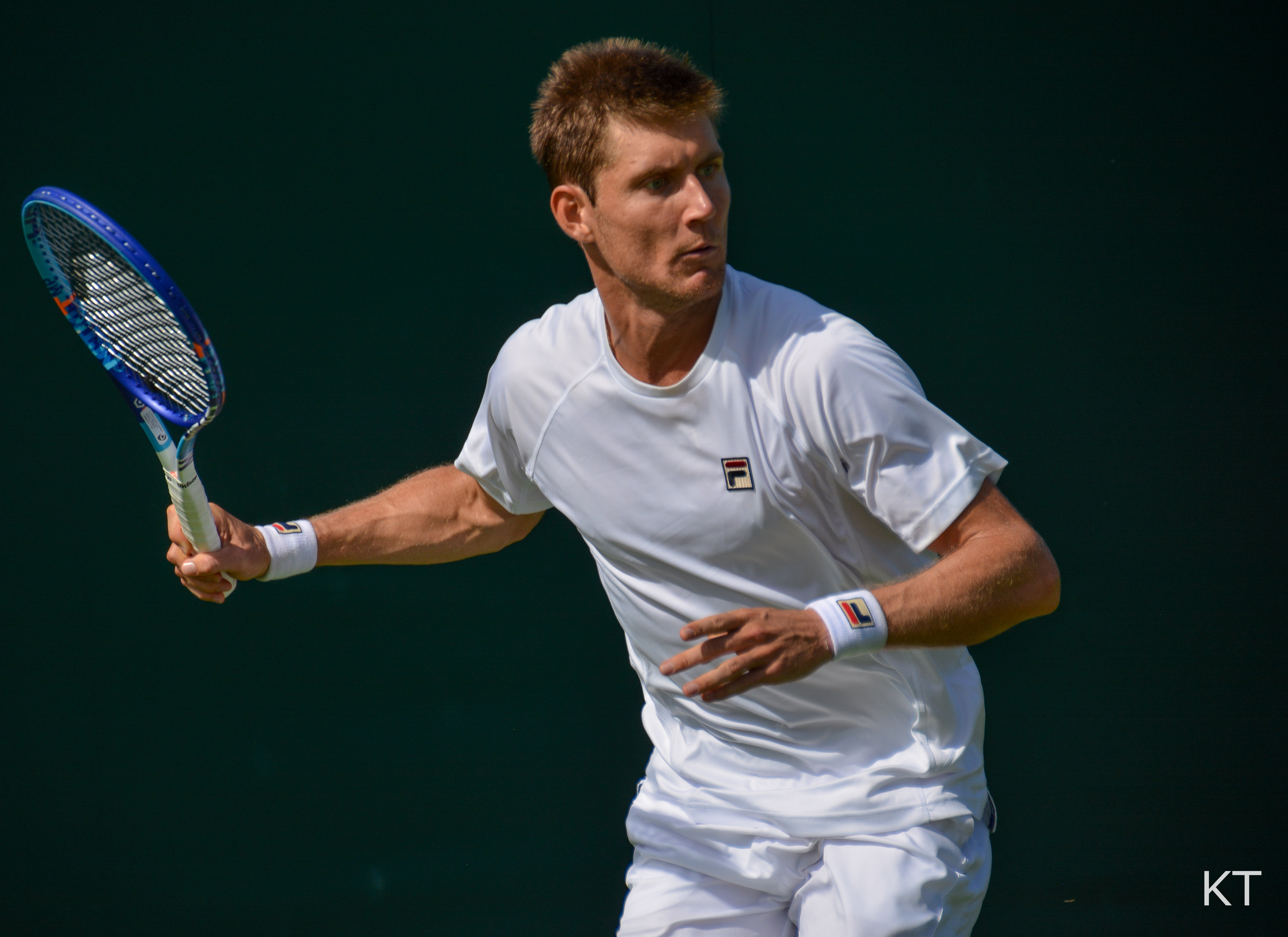
Ebden at the 2015 Wimbledon Championships

Ebden commenced the year attempting to qualify for the Australian Open but lost in round 1 to Matthias Bachinger. Ebden then competed in a series of Challenger events throughout February and March in Hong Kong, Burnie, Launceston, Shimadzu, Guangzhou, Shezhen and Israel with limited success. In April, Ebden made the quarter-finals of the Batman Challenger in Turkey before three consecutive Challenger semi-finals in Santaizi, Karshi and Samarkand in May. These results boasted his ranking from low 300's to 206. In June, Ebden played in the United Kingdom on grass and made quarter final of the Manchester Challenger before winning the Surbiton Challenger the following week as an unseeded player and defeating 4 seeds along the way; including Denis Kudla in the final. The following week, Kudla got revenge, defeating Ebden made the final of Ilkley Challenger. These results were rewarded with a wild card into Wimbledon. At Wimbleon, Edben won his career-first main draw match defeating Blaž Rola in straight sets. Ebden lost to John Isner in round 2. Following this, Ebden continued his good form on the Challenger circuit, winning the Latrobe Challenger in November. Ebden finished the year with a ranking of 105.

=== 2016: Injury-ravaged season ===
Ebden was awarded a wild card into the 2016 Australian Open but lost in round one to Marcel Granollers. In February, Ebden lost in round one of Delray Championships to Jérémy Chardy. This was his last match for seven months after which he sought advice and treatment from a multitude of health professionals in different countries.

Ebden returned to competition at the OEC Kaohsiung Challenger then played qualifying at three Asian ATP events before returning to the Australian Challenger circuit. Due to his injuries and time away from the tour, Ebden finished the year with a ranking of 698, his worst end of season ranking in a decade.

=== 2017: First ATP singles final and return to top 100 ===
Ebden made the second round of qualifying at the 2017 Australian Open. In February, he reached the quarter-finals of 2017 Burnie International before travelling the North America where he qualified for and reached the quarter-final of the Memphis Open. Ebden lost in round 1 of qualifying at Indian Wells, before returning to the Challenger Circuit in Asia. In May, Ebden lost in round 1 of qualifying at the 2017 French Open. Ebden had a poor run of form in June and early July, which saw him fail to win a main draw singles match at five consecutive tournaments. At the Hall of Fame Tennis Championships in Newport, Ebden snapped his losing streak and made a surprise run to his first ATP final, where he lost to John Isner in straight sets. At the US Open, Ebden lost in the first round of qualifying. In October, Ebden qualified for the Japan Open, an ATP 500 event. In the main draw, Ebden won his opening match against Ivo Karlović, before falling to 4th seed and eventual champion, David Goffin in the second round. Ebden then returned to the Challenger tour, where he claimed titles in Canberra and Toyota, his first trophies since 2015. With the victories, Ebden's singles ranking improved to No. 80 in the world, his highest world ranking since July 2014.

=== 2018: Best season in singles, Top 40 debut and career-high ranking ===
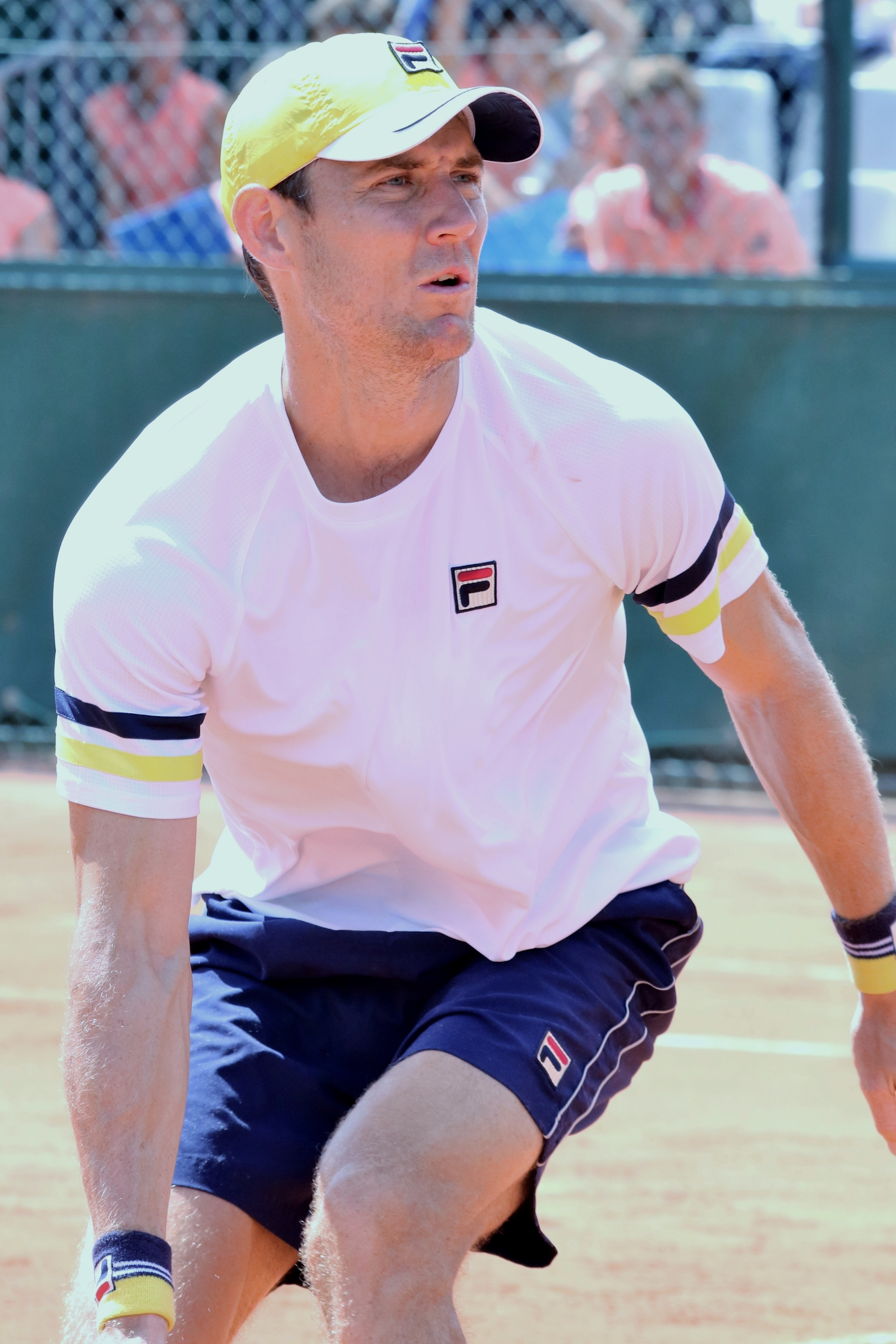
Ebden at the 2018 French Open

Ebden commenced 2018 at the Brisbane International, losing to Nick Kyrgios in round 2. At the 2018 Australian Open, Ebden recorded his first win against a top 20 player at a Grand Slam by defeating 16th seed John Isner in round 1. In March, Ebden lost to Gaël Monfils in round 1 of Indian Wells and round 2 of Miami Open. In April, Ebden returned to the Asian Challenger Circuit, winning Busan in May. At the 2018 French Open, Ebden lost in round 1 to Thomas Fabbiano. In June, Ebden reached the semifinal of Surbiton Trophy, semifinal of Rosmalen Grass Court Championships and the quarterfinal of Gerry Weber Open.

At Wimbledon, Ebden defeated 10th seed David Goffin, Stéphane Robert but lost to Gilles Simon in the third round. It was the first time he has reached the third round of a grand slam, and as a result entered into the world's top 50.

In August, Ebden reached the semifinal of Atlanta. At the US Open, Ebden reached the second round. Ebden continued his ranking rise and on 16 October 2018, Ebden broke into the world's top 40 and later reached a career-high in singles of World No. 39 on 22 October 2018, following a quarterfinal result in Shanghai Masters.

=== 2019–2020: Hopman Cup; loss of form, out of top 300 in singles ===
Ebden commenced the season representing Australia at the 2019 Hopman Cup alongside Ashleigh Barty. The duo were eliminated in the round-robin stage.

Ebden lost in round 1 of Sydney International. Ebden lost in the second round of the Australian Open to Rafael Nadal.

At the 2019 Sofia Open he defeated Bulgarian teenager Adrian Andreev in a close three sets match before losing to 2016 champion and fourth seed Roberto Bautista Agut in the second round.

=== 2021: Australian Open mixed doubles final, back to top 100 in doubles ===
Ebden started his 2021 season at the first edition of the Great Ocean Road Open. He lost in the second round to Thiago Monteiro. At the Australian Open, he was defeated in the first round of qualifying by compatriot Jason Kubler. In doubles, he and John-Patrick Smith made it to the quarterfinals where they lost to the ninth-seeded team of Ivan Dodig/Filip Polášek. In mixed doubles, he teamed up with compatriot, Sam Stosur. They reached the final where they lost to Barbora Krejčíková/Rajeev Ram.

Playing at the first edition of the Singapore Open as a wildcard, Ebden reached the quarterfinals where he lost to eventual champion Alexei Popyrin. In doubles, he and John-Patrick Smith made it to the final where they lost to the top-seeded team of Sander Gillé/Joran Vliegen. At the Saint Petersburg Challenger, he was defeated in the second round by qualifier Lucas Catarina. Getting past qualifying at the Open 13, he upset third seed Karen Khachanov in the quarterfinals to reach the semifinals of an ATP tournament for the first time since 2018. He retired during his semifinal match against top seed Daniil Medvedev due to injury. In Dubai, he retired during his second round match against fourth seed Roberto Bautista Agut due to the same injury he suffered from the previous tournament he played in. In April, he competed at the Sardegna Open. He lost in the first round of qualifying to Cedrik-Marcel Stebe. At the Orlando Open, he was beaten in the first round by sixth seed Prajnesh Gunneswaran. He was eliminated in the first round of qualifying at the French Open by Alejandro Tabilo.

Coming through qualifying at the Nottingham Open, Ebden lost in the second round to top seed Dan Evans. At the Nottingham Trophy, he retired during his second round of qualifying match against compatriot, Alex Bolt, who would end up winning the title. At Wimbledon, he was defeated in the second round of qualifying by British wildcard Arthur Fery.

Getting past the qualifying rounds at the Los Cabos Open, Ebden lost in the first round to Elias Ymer. Competing in Atlanta, he was defeated in the final round of qualifying by Evgeny Donskoy. At the Citi Open in Washington, D.C., he was eliminated in the first round of qualifying by Emilio Gómez.

At the US Open, he was beaten in the first round of qualifying by Federico Gaio. At the same tournament he reached his second Grand Slam quarterfinal of the year in doubles partnering Max Purcell.

He finished the year ranked World No. 57 in doubles and No. 232 in singles.

=== 2022: Australian Open finalist, Wimbledon champion & mixed doubles finalist, top 25 ===
Embarking on the 2022 Australian Open, Ebden partnered once more with Purcell. After defeating Jonathan Erlich and André Göransson in the first round, they went on to topple four seeded teams consecutively en route to Ebden's first career Grand Slam final and their first-ever doubles final as a pair overall. In the second round, Ebden and Purcell beat fourth seeds Juan Sebastián Cabal and Robert Farah from a set down before reaching the third round, where they defeated thirteenth seeds Raven Klaasen and Ben McLachlan in straight sets to make the quarterfinals. This equaled Ebden's career-best showing at the Australian Open and earned the pair their second Grand Slam quarterfinal appearance together. In the quarterfinals, they knocked out tenth seeds Wesley Koolhof and Neal Skupski from a set down and through the final ten-point deciding set tiebreak to reach the semifinals. Together with Thanasi Kokkinakis and Nick Kyrgios, Ebden and Purcell made it the most Australians to reach this stage of the men's doubles tournament since 1993 and the first since 1985 that two all-Australian pairings contested the semifinals. Their quarterfinals win set them up for a match against second seeds Rajeev Ram and Joe Salisbury, where they saved four set points in the second set to defeat the pair in straight sets to reach the final. Ebden and Purcell faced Kokkinakis and Kyrgios in the final, the first in men's doubles at the Australian Open to feature two all-Australian teams since 1980, where they ultimately lost in straight sets.

Seeded 14th in doubles at the 2022 Wimbledon Championships, he reached the quarterfinals with Purcell for the first time defeating the third seeded pair of Wesley Koolhof and Neal Skupski avenging their loss in the final of the 2022 Libéma Open earlier in the grass season. The pair went on to reach the semifinals defeating 7th seeds Filip Polášek and John Peers. Next they defeated the top pair of Joe Salisbury and Rajeev Ram in a five sets close to four hours match saving five match points to reach their second Major final. They went on to win the title defeating second seeded pair of Nikola Mektić and Mate Pavić in a more than a four hours, five set match with a super tiebreak. At the same tournament, in mixed doubles partnering Sam Stosur they reached their second major final as a pair defeating Jack Sock and Coco Gauff. They lost to defending champions Desirae Krawczyk and Neal Skupski.

=== 2023: New partnership with Bopanna, maiden Masters title, US Open final, World No. 4 ===
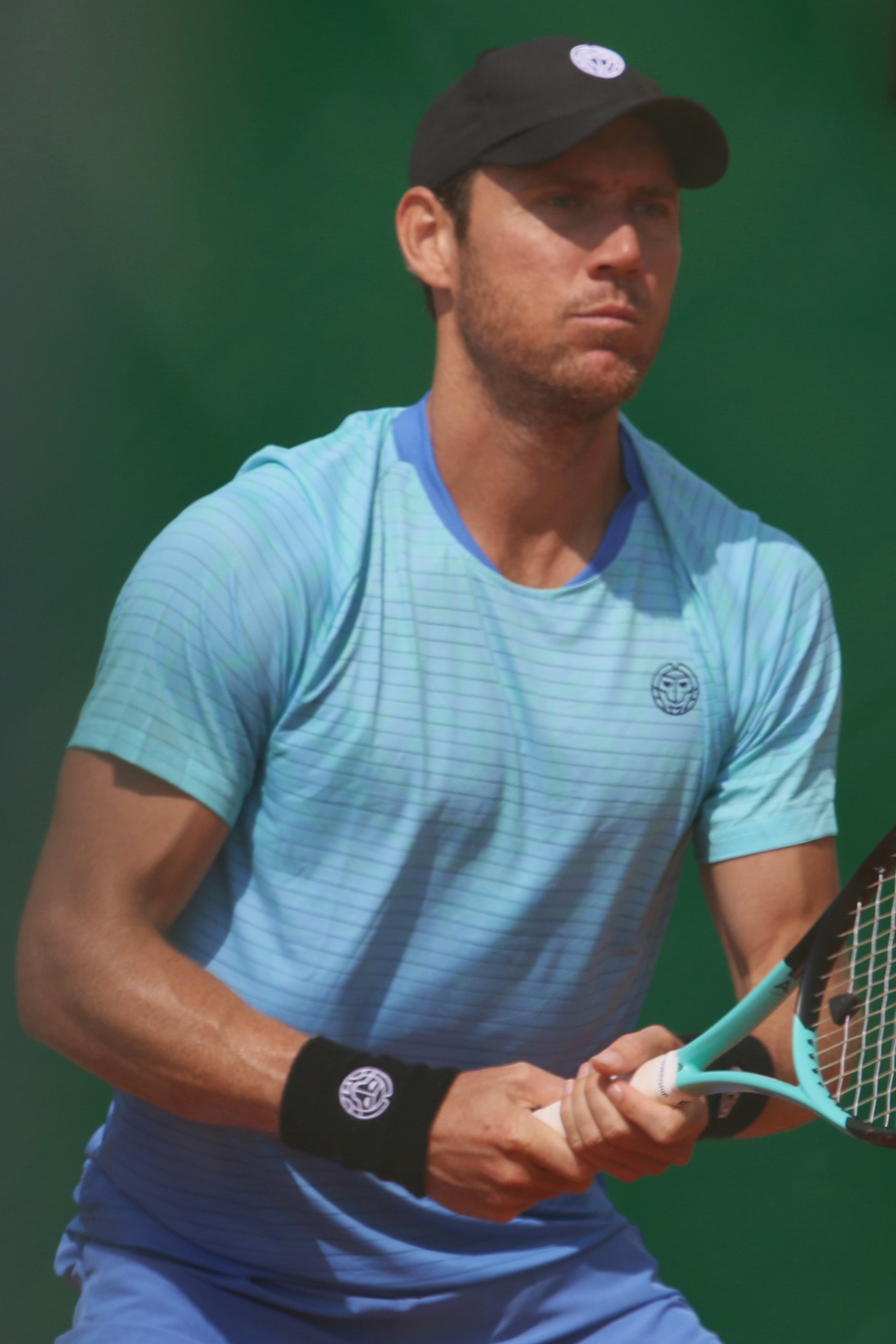
Ebden at the 2023 Monte-Carlo Masters

In Rotterdam he reached the final with his new partner Rohan Bopanna but lost after they held a championship point in the match tiebreak to Ivan Dodig and Austin Krajicek. The pair won their first title in Doha, defeating Constant Lestienne and Botic van de Zandschulp in the final. Ebden won his first Masters title at Indian Wells once again partnering Bopanna, defeating defending champions Jack Sock and John Isner in the semifinals, and top seeded and world No. 1 pair of Wesley Koolhof and Neal Skupski in the final. As a result, he reached a new career-high ranking of No. 18 on 20 March 2023 and also became Australia's Number 1 men's doubles player.

He reached the top 15 on 8 May 2023 following the final in 2023 Mutua Madrid Open, losing to Andrey Rublev and Karen Khachanov. Following the 2023 Wimbledon Championships where he reached the semifinals, he entered the top 10 in doubles on 17 July 2023. He reached the finals at the US Open. Continuing with his good form, he also reached the finals of two other Masters 1000 events at the 2023 Rolex Shanghai Masters and at the 2023 Rolex Paris Masters.

=== 2024: First Australian Open title, world No. 1, Olympic gold medal ===
Ebden alongside Bopanna reached the Adelaide International final in their first outing of the 2024 season, where they lost to the pair of Rajeev Ram and Joe Salisbury in a tight match 5–7, 7–5, [9–11]. The pair continued their good performance in the 2024 Australian Open where he was seeded second for the first time in his career. Ebden's straight sets win over the 14th-seeded pair of Wesley Koolhof and Nikola Mektic in the third round assured him of a career high ranking of World No. 3. They defeated the Argentinian pair of Máximo González and Andrés Molteni in the quarterfinals and Ebden reached a new career-high ranking of world No. 2. He reached his second Australian Open final with a win in a three sets with a super tiebreaker close match over unseeded pair of Tomáš Macháč and Zhizhen Zhang. Bopanna and Ebden won the Australian Open men's doubles in straight sets defeating the Italian duo of Simone Bolelli and Andrea Vavassori.

Ebden attained the World No. 1 doubles ranking on 26 February. However he only held the top ranking for just one week because Bopanna reclaimed the top ranking once again on 4 March 2024 after winning his first round match at the Dubai Tennis Championships. Ebden failed to defend to defend his title at the 2024 Indian Wells Open. He lost in the first round to the Belgian duo of Sander Gille and Joran Vliegen. Partnering with Storm Hunter at the same tournament, Ebden won the inaugural eight-team invitational mixed doubles title, defeating Caroline Garcia and Édouard Roger-Vasselin in the final. The following week, Ebden played at the 2024 Miami Open, where the pair went on to lift the trophy by defeating Ivan Dodig and Austin Krajicek in the final. It was their second Masters 1000 as a pair, Bopanna's sixth and Ebden's second overall.

At the 2024 Summer Olympics, Ebden entered the men's singles tournament as an alternate, where he was drawn against the top seed Novak Djokovic, and lost 0–6, 1–6. In men's doubles, Ebden partnered John Peers and won the gold medal, defeating the team from the USA, to win Australia's first tennis gold medal since 1996. In mixed doubles, Ebden and Ellen Perez were the #2 seed.

== Performance timelines ==
Key
W	F	SF	QF	#R	RR	Q#	P#	DNQ	A	Z#	PO	G	S	B	NMS	NTI	P	NH

(W) winner; (F) finalist; (SF) semifinalist; (QF) quarterfinalist; (#R) rounds 4, 3, 2, 1; (RR) round-robin stage; (Q#) qualification round; (P#) preliminary round; (DNQ) did not qualify; (A) absent; (Z#) Davis/Fed Cup Zonal Group (with number indication) or (PO) play-off; (G) gold, (S) silver or (B) bronze Olympic/Paralympic medal; (NMS) not a Masters tournament; (NTI) not a Tier I tournament; (P) postponed; (NH) not held; (SR) strike rate (events won / competed); (W–L) win–loss record.
To avoid confusion and double counting, these charts are updated at the conclusion of a tournament or when the player's participation has ended.

=== Singles ===
Tournament	2007	2008	2009	2010	2011	2012	2013	2014	2015	2016	2017	2018	2019	2020	2021	2022	SR	W–L	Win%
Grand Slam tournaments
Australian Open	Q2	Q1	Q2	1R	1R	2R	1R	2R	Q1	1R	Q2	2R	2R	Q1	Q1	Q3	0 / 8	4–8	33%
French Open	A	A	A	Q1	A	1R	Q2	1R	A	A	Q1	1R	1R	A	Q1	A	0 / 4	0–4	0%
Wimbledon	A	A	A	Q3	Q2	1R	1R	1R	2R	A	A	3R	1R	NH	Q2	A	0 / 6	3–6	33%
US Open	A	A	A	Q1	Q2	2R	Q1	2R	1R	A	Q1	2R	A	A	Q1	A	0 / 4	3–4	43%
Win–loss	0–0	0–0	0–0	0–1	0–1	2–4	0–2	2–4	1–2	0–1	0–0	4–4	1–3	0–0	0–0	0–0	0 / 22	10–22	31%
National representation
Davis Cup	A	A	A	A	A	Z1	Z1	A	A	A	A	1R	A	A	A	A	0 / 1	4–0	100%
ATP Masters Series
Indian Wells Masters	A	A	A	A	1R	4R	2R	1R	A	A	Q1	1R	1R	NH	A	A	0 / 6	4–6	40%
Miami Open	A	A	A	A	Q1	1R	Q1	2R	A	A	A	2R	1R	NH	A	Q1	0 / 4	2–4	33%
Monte-Carlo Masters	A	A	A	A	A	A	A	A	A	A	A	A	A	NH	A	A	0 / 0	0–0	–
Madrid Open	A	A	A	A	A	Q1	A	A	A	A	A	A	A	NH	A	A	0 / 0	0–0	–
Italian Open	A	A	A	A	A	Q1	A	A	A	A	A	A	A	A	A	A	0 / 0	0–0	–
Canadian Open	A	A	A	A	Q2	2R	Q1	Q1	A	A	Q2	1R	A	NH	A	Q1	0 / 2	1–2	33%
Cincinnati Masters	A	A	A	A	A	Q1	A	Q2	A	A	A	A	A	A	A	A	0 / 0	0–0	–
Shanghai Masters	NH		A	A	QF	Q1	A	A	Q1	Q1	A	QF	A	NH			0 / 2	6–2	75%
Paris Masters	A	A	A	A	Q1	Q1	A	A	A	A	A	2R	A	A	A	A	0 / 1	0–1	–
Win–loss	0–0	0–0	0–0	0–0	3–2	4–3	1–1	1–2	0–0	0–0	0–0	4–4	0–2	0–0	0–0	0–0	0 / 15	13–15	46%
Career statistics
	2007	2008	2009	2010	2011	2012	2013	2014	2015	2016	2017	2018	2019	2020	2021	2022	Career		
Tournaments	0	0	0	2	10	23	11	21	6	4	7	22	16	0	5	1	128		
Titles–Finals	0–0	0–0	0–0	0–0	0–0	0–0	0–0	0–0	0–0	0–0	0–1	0–0	0–0	0–0	0–0	0–0	0–1		
Overall win–loss	0–0	0–0	0–0	1–2	10–10	17–23	6–11	5–21	1–6	0–4	9–7	19–22	5–16	0–0	6–5	0–1	0 / 128	79–129	38%
Year-end ranking	542	332	285	196	86	105	68	231	105	698	76	46	244	317	232	740	37.98%		

=== Doubles ===
Current through the 2026 Australian Open.

Tournament	2009	2010	2011	2012	2013	2014	2015	2016	2017	2018	2019	2020	2021	2022	2023	2024	2025	2026	SR	W–L
Grand Slam tournaments
Australian Open	1R	1R	1R	1R	1R	1R	1R	A	2R	1R	1R	1R	QF	F	1R	W	1R	2R	1 / 17	16–16
French Open	A	A	A	QF	A	1R	A	A	A	1R	1R	A	1R	1R	1R	SF	QF		0 / 9	9–9
Wimbledon	A	A	A	1R	2R	1R	1R	A	A	2R	2R	NH	2R	W	SF	2R	1R		1 / 11	15–10
US Open	A	A	1R	2R	A	1R	A	A	A	2R	A	A	QF	3R	F	3R	1R		0 / 9	14–8
Win–loss	0–1	0–1	0–2	4–4	1–2	0–4	0–2	0–0	1–1	2–4	1–3	0–1	7–4	13–3	9–4	12–3	3–4	1–1	2 / 46	54–44
Year-end championships
ATP Finals	Did not qualify													Alt	SF	RR			0 / 2	3–4
ATP Masters Series
Indian Wells Masters	A	A	A	2R	A	A	A	A	A	A	A	A	A	A	W	1R	2R		1 / 4	6–3
Miami Open	A	A	A	A	A	A	A	A	A	A	A	A	A	2R	1R	W	2R		1 / 4	7–3
Monte-Carlo Masters	A	A	A	A	A	A	A	A	A	A	A	A	A	A	2R	2R	1R		0 / 3	1–3
Madrid Open	A	A	A	A	A	A	A	A	A	A	A	A	A	A	F	1R	1R		0 / 3	4–3
Italian Open	A	A	A	A	A	A	A	A	A	A	A	A	A	2R	2R	2R	2R		0 / 4	4–4
Canadian Open	A	A	A	A	A	A	A	A	A	A	A	A	A	1R	QF	2R	1R		0 / 4	1–4
Cincinnati Open	A	A	A	A	A	A	A	A	A	A	A	A	A	1R	2R	2R	2R		0 / 4	1–4
Shanghai Open	NH	A	A	A	A	A	A	A	A	1R	A	NH			F	1R	A		0 / 3	4–3
Paris Masters	A	A	A	A	A	A	A	A	A	A	A	A	A	QF	F	QF	A		0 / 3	5–3
Win–loss	0–0	0–0	0–0	1–1	0–0	0–0	0–0	0–0	0–0	0–1	0–0	0–0	0–0	4–5	17–8	7–8	4–7	0–0	2 / 32	33–30
Career Statistics
Tournaments	1	1	8	17	8	16	4	1	3	15	13	3	13	24	24	18	21	2	192	
Titles	0	0	2	1	0	1	0	0	0	0	0	0	0	3	2	3	1	0	13	
Finals	0	0	2	2	0	1	0	0	0	0	1	0	1	6	7	5	1	0	26	
Overall Win–loss	0–1	0–1	10–6	15–16	4–8	9–13	2–6	0–1	4–3	10–16	7–12	2–3	19–13	39–22	48–24	36–20	17–20	1–2	223–187	
Year-end ranking	420	207	92	70	221	89	186	592	233	106	121	117	57	26	4	13	69		$6,749,615	

=== Mixed doubles ===
Tournament	2010	2011	2012	2013	2014	...	2018	2019	2020	2021	2022	2023	2024	2025	SR	W–L
Grand Slam tournaments
Australian Open	1R	1R	2R	W	SF		1R	A	2R	F	2R	1R	2R	A	1 / 11	17–10
French Open	A	A	A	A	A		A	A	NH	A	QF	2R	QF	A	0 / 3	5–3
Wimbledon	A	A	A	A	A		A	A	NH	2R	F	QF	1R	1R	0 / 5	7–5
US Open	A	A	A	A	A		A	A	NH	A	QF	1R	QF	A	0 / 3	4–3
Win–loss	0–1	0–1	1–1	5–0	3–1		0–1	0–0	1–1	5–2	9–4	3–4	4–4	0–1	1 / 22	33–21

== Significant finals ==
=== Grand Slam finals ===
==== Doubles: 4 (2 title, 2 runner-up) ====
Result	Year	Championship	Surface	Partner	Opponents	Score
Loss	2022	Australian Open	Hard	(Australia) Max Purcell	(Australia) Thanasi Kokkinakis (Australia) Nick Kyrgios	5–7, 4–6
Win	2022	Wimbledon	Grass	(Australia) Max Purcell	(Croatia) Nikola Mektić (Croatia) Mate Pavić	7–6^{(7–5)}, 6–7^{(3–7)}, 4–6, 6–4, 7–6^{(10–2)}
Loss	2023	US Open	Hard	(India) Rohan Bopanna	(United States) Rajeev Ram (United Kingdom) Joe Salisbury	6–2, 3–6, 4–6
Win	2024	Australian Open	Hard	(India) Rohan Bopanna	(Italy) Simone Bolelli (Italy) Andrea Vavassori	7–6^{(7–0)}, 7–5

==== Mixed doubles: 3 (1 title, 2 runner-ups) ====
Result	Year	Championship	Surface	Partner	Opponents	Score
Win	2013	Australian Open	Hard	(Australia) Jarmila Gajdošová	(Czech Republic) Lucie Hradecká (Czech Republic) František Čermák	6–3, 7–5
Loss	2021	Australian Open	Hard	(Australia) Samantha Stosur	(Czech Republic) Barbora Krejčíková (United States) Rajeev Ram	1–6, 4–6
Loss	2022	Wimbledon	Grass	(Australia) Samantha Stosur	(United States) Desirae Krawczyk (United Kingdom) Neal Skupski	4–6, 3–6

=== Olympic finals ===
==== Doubles: 1 (1 Gold medal) ====
Result	Year	Tournament	Surface	Partner	Opponents	Score
Gold	2024	Summer Olympics	Clay	(Australia) John Peers	(United States) Austin Krajicek (United States) Rajeev Ram	6–7^{(6–8)}, 7–6^{(7–1)}, [10–8]

=== Masters 1000 Finals ===
==== Doubles: 5 (2 title, 3 runner-up) ====
Result	Year	Tournament	Surface	Partner	Opponents	Score
Win	2023	Indian Wells Masters	Hard	(India) Rohan Bopanna	(Netherlands) Wesley Koolhof (United Kingdom) Neal Skupski	6–3, 2–6, [10–8]
Loss	2023|	Madrid Open	Clay	(India) Rohan Bopanna	Andrey Rublev; Karen Khachonov	3–6, 6–3, [3–10]
Loss	2023	Shanghai Masters	Hard	(India) Rohan Bopanna	(Spain) Marcel Granollers (Argentina) Horacio Zeballos	7–5, 2–6, [7–10]
Loss	2023	Paris Masters	Hard (i)	(India) Rohan Bopanna	(Mexico) Santiago González (France) Édouard Roger-Vasselin	2–6, 7–5, [7–10]
Win	2024	Miami Open	Hard	(India) Rohan Bopanna	(Croatia) Ivan Dodig (United States) Austin Krajicek	6–7^{(3–7)}, 6–3, [10–6]

== ATP career finals ==
=== Singles: 1 (1 runner-up) ===
Legend Grand Slam tournaments (0–0) ATP World Tour Finals (0–0) ATP World Tour Masters 1000 (0–0) ATP World Tour 500 Series (0–0) ATP World Tour 250 Series (0–1)	Finals by surface Hard (0–0) Clay (0–0) Grass (0–1)	Finals by setting Outdoor (0–1) Indoor (0–0)

Result	W–L	Date	Tournament	Tier	Surface	Opponent	Score
Loss	0–1	Jul 2017	Hall of Fame Championships, United States	250 Series	Grass	(United States) John Isner	3–6, 6–7^{(4–7)}

=== Doubles: 26 (13 titles, 13 runner-ups) ===
Legend Grand Slam tournaments (2–2) ATP World Tour Finals (0–0) ATP World Tour Masters 1000 (2–3) Summer Olympics (1–0) ATP World Tour 500 Series (1–1) ATP World Tour 250 Series (7–7)	Finals by surface Hard (7–9) Clay (3–2) Grass (3–2)	Finals by setting Outdoor (13–10) Indoor (0–3)

Result	W–L	Date	Tournament	Tier	Surface	Partner	Opponents	Score
Win	1–0	Jul 2011	Hall of Fame Championships, United States	250 Series	Grass	(United States) Ryan Harrison	(Sweden) Johan Brunström (Canada) Adil Shamasdin	4–6, 6–3, [10–5]
Win	2–0	Jul 2011	Atlanta Open, United States	250 Series	Hard	(United States) Alex Bogomolov Jr.	(Germany) Matthias Bachinger (Germany) Frank Moser	3–6, 7–5, [10–8]
Loss	2–1	Jan 2012	Sydney International, Australia	250 Series	Hard	(Finland) Jarkko Nieminen	(United States) Bob Bryan (United States) Mike Bryan	1–6, 4–6
Win	3–1	Jul 2012	Atlanta Open, United States (2)	250 Series	Hard	(United States) Ryan Harrison	(Belgium) Xavier Malisse (United States) Michael Russell	6–3, 3–6, [10–6]
Win	4–1	Mar 2014	Mexican Open, Mexico	500 Series	Clay	(South Africa) Kevin Anderson	(Spain) Feliciano López (Belarus) Max Mirnyi	6–3, 6–3
Loss	4–2	May 2019	Geneva Open, Switzerland	250 Series	Clay	(Sweden) Robert Lindstedt	(Austria) Oliver Marach (Croatia) Mate Pavić	4–6, 4–6
Loss	4–3	Feb 2021	Singapore Open, Singapore	250 Series	Hard (i)	(Australia) John-Patrick Smith	(Belgium) Sander Gillé (Belgium) Joran Vliegen	2–6, 3–6
Loss	4–4	Jan 2022	Australian Open, Australia	Grand Slam	Hard	(Australia) Max Purcell	(Australia) Thanasi Kokkinakis (Australia) Nick Kyrgios	5–7, 4–6
Win	5–4	Apr 2022	U.S. Men's Clay Court Championships, United States	250 Series	Clay	(Australia) Max Purcell	(Serbia) Ivan Sabanov (Serbia) Matej Sabanov	6–3, 6–3
Loss	5–5	Jun 2022	Rosmalen Championships, Netherlands	250 Series	Grass	(Australia) Max Purcell	(Netherlands) Wesley Koolhof (United Kingdom) Neal Skupski	6–4, 5–7, [6–10]
Win	6–5	Jul 2022	Wimbledon Championships, United Kingdom	Grand Slam	Grass	(Australia) Max Purcell	(Croatia) Nikola Mektić (Croatia) Mate Pavić	7–6^{(7–5)}, 6–7^{(3–7)}, 4–6, 6–4, 7–6^{(10–2)}
Win	7–5	Aug 2022	Winston-Salem Open, United States	250 Series	Hard	(United Kingdom) Jamie Murray	(Monaco) Hugo Nys (Poland) Jan Zieliński	6–4, 6–2
Loss	7–6	Oct 2022	Tennis Napoli Cup, Italy	250 Series	Hard	(Australia) John Peers	(Croatia) Ivan Dodig (United States) Austin Krajicek	3–6, 6–1, [8–10]
Loss	7–7	Feb 2023	Rotterdam Open, Netherlands	500 Series	Hard (i)	(India) Rohan Bopanna	(Croatia) Ivan Dodig (United States) Austin Krajicek	6–7^{(5–7)}, 6–2, [10–12]
Win	8–7	Feb 2023	Qatar Open, Qatar	250 Series	Hard	(India) Rohan Bopanna	(France) Constant Lestienne (Netherlands) Botic van de Zandschulp	6–7^{(5–7)}, 6–4, [10–6]
Win	9–7	Mar 2023	Indian Wells, United States	Masters 1000	Hard	(India) Rohan Bopanna	(Netherlands) Wesley Koolhof (United Kingdom) Neal Skupski	6–3, 2–6, [10–8]
Loss	9–8	May 2023	Madrid Open, Spain	Masters 1000	Clay	(India) Rohan Bopanna	Andrey Rublev; Karen Khachanov	3–6, 6–3, [3–10]
Loss	9–9	Sep 2023	US Open, United States	Grand Slam	Hard	(India) Rohan Bopanna	(United States) Rajeev Ram (United Kingdom) Joe Salisbury	6–2, 3–6, 4–6
Loss	9–10	Oct 2023	Shanghai Masters, China	Masters 1000	Hard	(India) Rohan Bopanna	(Spain) Marcel Granollers (Argentina) Horacio Zeballos	7–5, 2–6, [7–10]
Loss	9–11	Oct 2023	Paris Masters, France	Masters 1000	Hard (i)	(India) Rohan Bopanna	(Mexico) Santiago González (France) Édouard Roger-Vasselin	2–6, 7–5, [7–10]
Loss	9–12	Jan 2024	Adelaide International, Australia	250 Series	Hard	(India) Rohan Bopanna	(United States) Rajeev Ram (United Kingdom) Joe Salisbury	5–7, 7–5, [9–11]
Win	10–12	Jan 2024	Australian Open, Australia	Grand Slam	Hard	(India) Rohan Bopanna	(Italy) Simone Bolelli (Italy) Andrea Vavassori	7–6^{(7–0)}, 7–5
Win	11–12	Mar 2024	Miami Open, United States	Masters 1000	Hard	(India) Rohan Bopanna	(Croatia) Ivan Dodig (United States) Austin Krajicek	6–7^{(3–7)}, 6–3, [10–6]
Loss	11–13	Jun 2024	Eastbourne International, United Kingdom	250 Series	Grass	(Australia) John Peers	(United Kingdom) Neal Skupski (New Zealand) Michael Venus	6–4, 6–7^{(2–7)}, [9–11]
Win	12–13	Aug 2024	Olympic Games, France	Olympics	Clay	(Australia) John Peers	(United States) Austin Krajicek (United States) Rajeev Ram	6–7^{(6–8)}, 7–6^{(7–1)}, [10–8]
Win	13–13	Jun 2025	Rosmalen Championships, Netherlands	250 Series	Grass	(Australia) Jordan Thompson	(United Kingdom) Julian Cash (United Kingdom) Lloyd Glasspool	6–4, 3–6, [10–7]

== Team competition finals ==
=== Davis Cup: 2 (2 runner-ups) ===
Result	Date	Tournament	Surface	Partners	Opponents	Score
Loss	Nov 2022	Davis Cup, Málaga, Spain	Hard (i)	(Australia) Alex de Minaur (Australia) Jordan Thompson (Australia) Thanasi Kokkinakis (Australia) Max Purcell	(Canada) Félix Auger-Aliassime (Canada) Denis Shapovalov (Canada) Vasek Pospisil (Canada) Alexis Galarneau (Canada) Gabriel Diallo	0–2
Loss	Nov 2023	Davis Cup, Málaga, Spain	Hard (i)	(Australia) Alex de Minaur (Australia) Alexei Popyrin (Australia) Jordan Thompson (Australia) Max Purcell	(Italy) Jannik Sinner (Italy) Lorenzo Musetti (Italy) Matteo Arnaldi (Italy) Lorenzo Sonego (Italy) Simone Bolelli	0–2

== ATP Challenger and ITF Futures finals ==
=== Singles: 21 (15 titles, 6 runners-up) ===
Legend ATP Challenger Tour (9–4) ITF Futures Tour (6–2)	Finals by surface Hard (11–3) Clay (0–0) Grass (2–2) Carpet (2–1)

Result	W–L	Date	Tournament	Tier	Surface	Opponent	Score
Win	1–0	Aug 2007	Milwaukee, United States	Futures	Hard	(United States) Michael Yani	3–6, 6–1, 7–5
Win	2–0	May 2008	Changwon, South Korea	Futures	Hard	(Japan) Toshihide Matsui	6–4, 7–5
Loss	2–1	Feb 2009	Mildura, Australia	Futures	Grass	(Australia) Brydan Klein	0–6, 4–6
Win	3–1	Oct 2009	Port Pirie, Australia	Futures	Hard	(United Kingdom) Jamie Baker	6–2, 6–4
Win	4–1	Nov 2009	Esperance, Australia	Futures	Hard	(Australia) John Millman	6–3, 6–4
Loss	4–2	Nov 2009	Kalgoorlie, Australia	Futures	Hard	(Australia) John Millman	2–6, 6–7^{(1–7)}
Win	5–2	Dec 2009	Bendigo, Australia	Futures	Hard	(Australia) James Lemke	6–1, 6–1
Loss	0–1	Mar 2010	Kyoto, Japan	Challenger	Carpet (i)	(Japan) Yūichi Sugita	6–4, 4–6, 1–6
Win	6–2	Oct 2010	Glasgow, United Kingdom	Futures	Hard	(United Kingdom) Daniel Evans	6–2, 3–6, 6–3
Win	1–1	Jun 2013	Nottingham, United Kingdom	Challenger	Grass	(Germany) Benjamin Becker	7–5, 4–6, 7–5
Loss	1–2	Sep 2013	Napa, United States	Challenger	Hard	(United States) Donald Young	6–4, 4–6, 2–6
Loss	1–3	Oct 2013	Tiburon, United States	Challenger	Hard	(Canada) Peter Polansky	5–7, 3–6
Win	2–3	Oct 2013	Melbourne, Australia	Challenger	Hard	(Japan) Tatsuma Ito	6–3, 5–7, 6–3
Win	3–3	Nov 2013	Yokohama, Japan	Challenger	Hard	(Japan) Go Soeda	2–6, 7–6^{(7–3)}, 6–3
Win	4–3	Nov 2013	Toyota, Japan	Challenger	Carpet (i)	(Japan) Yūichi Sugita	6–3, 6–2
Win	5–3	Jun 2015	Surbiton, United Kingdom	Challenger	Grass	(United States) Denis Kudla	6–7^{(4–7)}, 6–4, 7–6^{(7–5)}
Loss	5–4	Jun 2015	Ilkley, United Kingdom	Challenger	Grass	(United States) Denis Kudla	3–6, 4–6
Win	6–4	Nov 2015	Traralgon, Australia	Challenger	Hard	(Australia) Jordan Thompson	7–5, 6–3
Win	7–4	Nov 2017	Canberra, Australia	Challenger	Hard	(Japan) Taro Daniel	7–6^{(7–4)}, 6–4
Win	8–4	Nov 2017	Toyota, Japan (2)	Challenger	Carpet (i)	(France) Calvin Hemery	7–6^{(7–3)}, 6–3
Win	9–4	May 2018	Busan, South Korea	Challenger	Hard	(Canada) Vasek Pospisil	7–6^{(7–4)}, 6–1

== Record against other players ==
=== Record against top 10 players ===
Ebden's match record against those who have been ranked in the top 10, with those who have been No. 1 in boldface

- (France) Gilles Simon 2–1
- (Italy) Matteo Berrettini 1–0
- (United States) James Blake 1–0
- (Austria) Jürgen Melzer 1–0
- (Austria) Dominic Thiem 1–0
- (Cyprus) Marcos Baghdatis 1–1
- (United States) Mardy Fish 1–2
- (Russia) Karen Khachanov 1–2
- (Belgium) David Goffin 1–3
- (United States) John Isner 1–5
- (Croatia) Marin Čilić 0–1
- (Serbia) **Novak Djokovic 0–1**
- (Switzerland) **Roger Federer 0–1**
- (Spain) David Ferrer 0–1
- (Italy) Fabio Fognini 0–1
- (Russia) **Daniil Medvedev 0–1**
- (Argentina) Diego Schwartzman 0–1
- (United States) Jack Sock 0–1
- (Sweden) Robin Söderling 0–1
- (Czech Republic) Radek Štěpánek 0–1
- (Greece) Stefanos Tsitsipas 0–1
- (Russia) Nikolay Davydenko 0–2
- (Bulgaria) Grigor Dimitrov 0–2
- (Australia) **Lleyton Hewitt 0–2**
- (France) Gaël Monfils 0–2
- (United Kingdom) **Andy Murray 0–2**
- (Spain) **Rafael Nadal 0–2**
- (Canada) Milos Raonic 0–2
- (Spain) Fernando Verdasco 0–2
- (Spain) Roberto Bautista Agut 0–3
- (South Africa) Kevin Anderson 0–3
- (France) Richard Gasquet 0–3
- (Japan) Kei Nishikori 0–3
- (Russia) Mikhail Youzhny 0–3

* Statistics correct As of 27 July 2024.

=== Wins over top-10 players ===
- He has a 3–12 record against players who were, at the time the match was played, ranked in the top 10.

#	Player	Rank	Event	Surface	Rd	Score	ME Rank
**2012**
1.	(United States) Mardy Fish	8	Indian Wells, United States	Hard	3R	6–3, 6–4	91
**2018**
2.	(Belgium) David Goffin	9	Wimbledon, London, United Kingdom	Grass	1R	6–4, 6–3, 6–4	51
3.	(Austria) Dominic Thiem	7	Shanghai, China	Hard	2R	6–4, 6–7^{(8–10)}, 7–6^{(7–4)}	51

* Statistics correct As of 12 March 2021.

== National representation ==
=== Olympic Games (6–2) ===
Paris 2024 - Men's Doubles (Partner John Peers)
Rd	Opponent	Surface	Score
1R	(Lebanon) Hady Habib & Benjamin Hassan	Clay	7–6^{(7–5)}, 6–2
2R	(Spain) Pablo Carreño Busta & Marcel Granollers (PR)	Clay	6–2, 7–5
QF	(Germany) Dominik Koepfer & Jan-Lennard Struff	Clay	7–6^{(7–2)}, 7–6^{(7–4)}
SF	(United States) Taylor Fritz & Tommy Paul (3)	Clay	7–5, 6–2
W	(United States) Austin Krajicek & Rajeev Ram (4)	Clay	6–7^{(6–8)}, 7–6^{(7–1)}, [10–8]

Paris 2024 - Mixed Doubles (Partner Ellen Perez) (Seed: 2)
Rd	Opponent	Surface	Score
1R	(Spain) Sara Sorribes Tormo & Marcel Granollers	Clay	6–3, 6–4
QF	(China) Wang Xinyu & Zhang Zhizhen	Clay	7–6^{(10–8)}, 6–7^{(8–10)}, [5–10]

Paris 2024 - Men's Singles
Rd	Opponent	Surface	Score
1R	(Serbia) Novak Djokovic (1)	Clay	0–6, 1–6

=== Davis Cup (15–3) ===
All Davis Cup matches: 16–3 (Singles: 5–0, Doubles: 11–3)
Round	Date	Opponents	Tie score	Venue	Surface	Match	Opponent(s)	Rubber score
2012 Davis Cup Asia/Oceania Zone Group I
1R	10–12 Feb 2012	China	5–0	Geelong	Grass	Singles 4	Ma Yanan	6–2, 6–2
2R	6–8 Apr 2012	South Korea	5–0	Brisbane	Hard	Singles 2	Jeong Suk-young	6–3, 6–3, 6–4
2R	6–8 Apr 2012	South Korea	5–0	Brisbane	Hard	Singles 5	Cho Min-hyeok	6–2, 2–6, 6–0
2013 Davis Cup Asia/Oceania Zone Group I
1R	1–3 Feb 2013	Chinese Taipei	5–0	Kaohsiung	Hard	Singles 2	Chen Ti	6–3, 6–4, 7–5
1R	1–3 Feb 2013	Chinese Taipei	5–0	Kaohsiung	Hard	Singles 5	Yang Tsung-hua	6–1, 6–2
2R	5–7 Apr 2013	Uzbekistan	3–1	Namangan	Clay (i)	Doubles (with Lleyton Hewitt)	Farrukh Dustov / Denis Istomin	7–5, 6–7, 6–4, 3–6, 6–3
2018 Davis Cup World Group
1R	2–4 Feb 2018	Germany	1–3	Brisbane	Hard	Doubles (with John Peers	Tim Pütz / Jan-Lennard Struff	4–6, 7–6, 2–6, 7–6, 4–6
2022 Davis Cup Finals
RR	13 Sep 2022	Belgium	3–0	Hamburg	Hard (i)	Doubles (with Max Purcell)	Sander Gillé / Joran Vliegen	6–1, 6–3
RR	15 Sep 2022	France	2–1	Hamburg	Hard (i)	Doubles (with Max Purcell)	Nicolas Mahut / Arthur Rinderknech	6–4, 6–4
RR	18 Sep 2022	Germany	1–2	Hamburg	Hard (i)	Doubles (with Max Purcell)	Kevin Krawietz / Tim Pütz	4–6, 4–6
2023 Davis Cup Finals
RR	13 Sep 2023	Great Britain	2–1	Manchester	Hard (i)	Doubles (with Max Purcell)	Dan Evans / Neal Skupski	7–6^{(7–5)}, 6–4
RR	14 Sep 2023	France	2–1	Manchester	Hard (i)	Doubles (with Max Purcell)	Nicolas Mahut / Édouard Roger-Vasselin	7–5, 6–3
RR	16 Sep 2023	Switzerland	3–0	Manchester	Hard (i)	Doubles (with Max Purcell)	Marc-Andrea Hüsler / Dominic Stricker	6–2, 6–4
QF	22 Nov 2023	Czech Republic	2–1	Málaga	Hard (i)	Doubles (with Max Purcell)	Jiří Lehečka / Adam Pavlásek	6–4, 7–5
2024 Davis Cup Finals
RR	10 Sep 2024	France	2–1	Valencia	Hard (i)	Doubles (with Max Purcell)	Pierre-Hugues Herbert / Édouard Roger-Vasselin	7–5, 5–7, 6–3
RR	12 Sep 2024	Czech Republic	3–0	Valencia	Hard (i)	Doubles (with Max Purcell)	Jakub Menšík / Adam Pavlásek	6–4, 6–2
RR	15 Sep 2024	Spain	1–2	Valencia	Hard (i)	Doubles (with Max Purcell)	Marcel Granollers / Pedro Martínez	7–5, 4–6, 4–6
QF	21 Nov 2024	United States	2–1	Málaga	Hard (i)	Doubles (with Jordan Thompson	Tommy Paul / Ben Shelton	6–4, 6–4
2025 Davis Cup Qualifiers first round
1R	31 Jan – 1 Feb 2025	Sweden	3–1	Stockholm	Hard (i)	Doubles (with John Peers	Filip Bergevi / André Göransson	6–7^{(7–9)}, 6–3, 6–2

=== United Cup (3–1) ===
Matches by type Singles (0–0) Mixed Doubles (3–1)

Rubber outcome	No.	Rubber	Match type (partner if any)	Opponent nation	Opponent player(s)	Score
▲29 December 2023 – 1 January 2024; Perth Arena, Perth, Australia; group stage; hard surface
Victory	1	III	Mixed Doubles (with Storm Hunter)	(United Kingdom) Great Britain	Katie Boulter / Neal Skupski	6–3, 7–6^{(5)}
Victory	2	III	Mixed Doubles (with Storm Hunter)	United States	Jessica Pegula / Rajeev Ram	6–3, 6–1
▲2–1; 3 January 2024; Perth Arena, Perth, Australia; Quarterfinals; hard surface
Victory	3	III	Mixed Doubles (with Storm Hunter)	Serbia	Dejana Radanović / Nikola Ćaćić	6–3, 6–3
▼1–2; 6 January 2024; Ken Rosewall Arena, Sydney, Australia; Semifinals; hard surface
Defeat	1	III	Mixed Doubles (with Storm Hunter)	Germany	Laura Siegemund / Alexander Zverev	6–7^{(2)}, 7–6^{(2)} [13–15]

=== Hopman Cup (3–5) ===
Matches by type Singles (1–3) Mixed Doubles (2–2)

Rubber outcome	Rubber	Stage	Match type (partner if any)	Opponent nation	Opponent player(s)	Score
2015 Hopman Cup; Perth Arena, Perth, Australia
Defeat	II	Group	Singles	Poland	Jerzy Janowicz	6–3, 5–7 0–6
2017 Hopman Cup; Perth Arena, Perth, Australia
Defeat	III	Group	Mixed Doubles (with Daria Gavrilova)	United States	CoCo Vandeweghe / Jack Sock	1–4, 1–4
2019 Hopman Cup; Perth Arena, Perth, Australia
Victory	II	Group	Singles	France	Lucas Pouille	3–6, 7–6^{(5)}, 6–2
Defeat	III	Group	Doubles (with Ashleigh Barty)	France	Alizé Cornet / Lucas Pouille	3–4^{(4-5)}, 2–4,
Defeat	II	Group	Singles	Spain	David Ferrer	6–7^{(1)}, 5–7
Victory	III	Group	Doubles (with Ashleigh Barty)	Spain	Garbiñe Muguruza / David Ferrer	3–4^{(3-5)}, 4–3^{(5-0)}, 4–3^{(5-3)}
Defeat	II	Group	Singles	Germany	Alexander Zverev	4–6, 3–6
Victory	III	Group	Doubles (with Ashleigh Barty)	Germany	Angelique Kerber / Alexander Zverev	4–0, 4–3^{(5-1)}
