= 2023 BNP Paribas Open =

- Date: March 6–19
- Edition: 49th (ATP) / 34th (WTA)
- Category: ATP Tour Masters 1000 (Men); WTA 1000 (Women)
- Draw: 96S / 32D
- Prize money: $8,800,000 (ATP) $8,800,000 (WTA)
- Surface: Hard
- Location: Indian Wells, California, United States
- Venue: Indian Wells Tennis Garden

Champions

Men's singles
- (Spain) Carlos Alcaraz

Women's singles
- (Kazakhstan) Elena Rybakina

Men's doubles
- (India) Rohan Bopanna / (Australia) Matthew Ebden

Women's doubles
- (Czech Republic) Barbora Krejčíková / (Czech Republic) Kateřina Siniaková
← 2022 ·	Indian Wells Open	· 2024 →

The 2023 Indian Wells Open was a professional men's and women's tennis tournament played in Indian Wells, California. It was the 49th edition of the men's event and 34th of the women's event and was classified as an ATP Tour Masters 1000 event on the 2023 ATP Tour and a WTA 1000 event on the 2023 WTA Tour. Both the men's and the women's qualifying and main draw events took place from March 6 through March 19, 2023 on outdoor hard courts at the Indian Wells Tennis Garden.

Carlos Alcaraz defeated Daniil Medvedev to win the Indian Wells men's singles title. It was his 3rd ATP Masters title and eighth ATP title. Iga Świątek was the defending women's singles champion, but she lost to Elena Rybakina in the semifinals. Elena Rybakina defeated Aryna Sabalenka to win the Indian Wells women's singles title. It was her 4th WTA title and first WTA 1000 title. Taylor Fritz was the defending men's singles champion, but he lost to Jannik Sinner in the quarterfinals.

John Isner and Jack Sock were the defending men's doubles champions, Xu Yifan and Yang Zhaoxuan are the defending women's doubles champions.

== Champions ==
=== Men's singles ===
- (Spain) Carlos Alcaraz def. Daniil Medvedev, 6–3, 6–2

This was Alcaraz's eighth ATP Title, and second of the year.

=== Women's singles ===
- (Kazakhstan) Elena Rybakina def. Aryna Sabalenka, 7–6^{(13–11)}, 6–4

This was Rybakina's fourth WTA Tour title, and first of the year. This was her maiden WTA 1000 title.

=== Men's doubles ===
- (India) Rohan Bopanna / (Australia) Matthew Ebden def. (Netherlands) Wesley Koolhof / (United Kingdom) Neal Skupski, 6–3, 2–6, [10–8]

=== Women's doubles ===
- (Czech Republic) Barbora Krejčíková / (Czech Republic) Kateřina Siniaková def. (Brazil) Beatriz Haddad Maia / (Germany) Laura Siegemund, 6–1, 6–7^{(3–7)}, [10–7]

== Points and prize money ==
=== Point distribution ===
Event	W	F	SF	QF	R16	R32	R64	R128	Q	Q2	Q1
Men's singles	1000	600	360	180	90	45	25*	10	16	8	0
Men's doubles	1000	600	360	180	90	0	—	—	—	—	—
Women's singles	1000	650	390	215	120	65	35*	10	30	20	2
Women's doubles	1000	650	390	215	120	10	—	—	—	—	—

* Players with byes receive first round points.

=== Prize money ===
The total combined prize money for the 2023 BNP Paribas Open was $17,600,000 with each tour (ATP and WTA) playing for a share of $8,800,000. This represented a rise of 5.27% from 2022.

Event	W	F	SF	QF	R16	R32	R64	R128	Q2	Q1
Men's singles	$1,262,220	$662,360	$352,635	$184,465	$96,955	$55,770	$30,885	$18,660	$9,440	$5,150
Women's singles	$1,262,220	$662,360	$352,635	$184,465	$96,955	$55,770	$30,885	$18,660	$9,440	$5,150
Men's doubles*	$436,730	$231,660	$123,550	$62,630	$33,460	$18,020	—	—	—	—
Women's doubles*	$436,730	$231,660	$123,550	$62,630	$33,460	$18,020	—	—	—	—

*per team

== See also ==
- 2023 ATP Tour
- 2023 WTA Tour
- ATP Tour Masters 1000
- WTA 1000 tournaments
