= 2023 BNP Paribas Open – Men's singles =

Tennis tournament event

Men's singles
- 2023 BNP Paribas Open

Final
- Champion: (Spain) Carlos Alcaraz
- Runner-up: Daniil Medvedev
- Score: 6–3, 6–2

Details
- Draw: 96 (12 Q / 8 WC )
- Seeds: 32

Events
Singles	men	women
Doubles	men	women
- Indian Wells Open

Carlos Alcaraz defeated Daniil Medvedev in the final, 6–3, 6–2 to win the men's singles tennis title at the 2023 Indian Wells Masters. He did not drop a set en route to his third Masters 1000 title and eighth ATP Tour title overall. With the win, he regained the world No. 1 singles ranking from Novak Djokovic, who was unable to enter the United States due to being unvaccinated for COVID-19. Alcaraz also ended the 19-match winning streak of Medvedev.

Taylor Fritz was the defending champion, but lost in the quarterfinals to Jannik Sinner.

Rafael Nadal withdrew from the tournament due to a left leg injury. As a result, he dropped out of the top 10 in the ATP rankings for the first time since his top 10 debut in April 2005, ending a record streak of 912 weeks.

== Seeds ==
All seeds received a bye into the second round.

1. (Spain) Carlos Alcaraz (champion)
2. (Greece) Stefanos Tsitsipas (second round)
3. (Norway) Casper Ruud (third round)
4. (United States) Taylor Fritz (quarterfinals)
5. Daniil Medvedev (final)
6. Andrey Rublev (fourth round)
7. (Denmark) Holger Rune (third round)
8. (Canada) Félix Auger-Aliassime (quarterfinals)
9. (Poland) Hubert Hurkacz (third round)
10. (United Kingdom) Cameron Norrie (quarterfinals)
11. (Italy) Jannik Sinner (semifinals)
12. (Germany) Alexander Zverev (fourth round)
13. Karen Khachanov (third round)
14. (United States) Frances Tiafoe (semifinals)
15. (Spain) Pablo Carreño Busta (withdrew)
16. (Australia) Alex de Minaur (second round)
17. (United States) Tommy Paul (fourth round)
18. (Croatia) Borna Ćorić (second round)
19. (Italy) Lorenzo Musetti (second round)
20. (Italy) Matteo Berrettini (second round)
21. (Bulgaria) Grigor Dimitrov (second round, retired)
22. (Spain) Roberto Bautista Agut (second round)
23. (Spain) Alejandro Davidovich Fokina (quarterfinals)
24. (United Kingdom) Daniel Evans (second round)
25. (Canada) Denis Shapovalov (second round)
26. (Serbia) Miomir Kecmanović (second round)
27. (Argentina) Francisco Cerúndolo (third round)
28. (Netherlands) Botic van de Zandschulp (second round, retired)
29. (Japan) Yoshihito Nishioka (second round)
30. (Argentina) Sebastián Báez (third round)
31. (Netherlands) Tallon Griekspoor (third round)
32. (United States) Maxime Cressy (second round)

Click on the seed number of a player to go to their draw section.

== Draw ==
Key

- Q = Qualifier
- WC = Wild card
- LL = Lucky loser
- Alt = Alternate
- ITF = ITF entry
- PR = Protected ranking
- SR = Special ranking
- SE = Special exempt
- JE = Junior exempt
- JR = Junior Accelerator Programme entrant
- CO = College Accelerator Programme entrant
- NG = Next Gen Accelerator Program entrant
- w/o = Walkover
- r = Retired
- d = Defaulted

=== Finals ===
Quarterfinals
1	(Spain) Carlos Alcaraz	6	6
8	(Canada) Félix Auger-Aliassime	4	4
4	(United States) Taylor Fritz	4	6	4
11	(Italy) Jannik Sinner	6	4	6
5	Daniil Medvedev	6	7
23	(Spain) Alejandro Davidovich Fokina	3	5
10	(United Kingdom) Cameron Norrie	4	4
14	(United States) Frances Tiafoe	6	6

Semifinals
1	(Spain) Carlos Alcaraz	7^{7}	6
11	(Italy) Jannik Sinner	6^{4}	3
5	Daniil Medvedev	7	7^{7}
14	(United States) Frances Tiafoe	5	6^{4}

Final
1	(Spain) Carlos Alcaraz	6	6
5	Daniil Medvedev	3	2

=== Top half ===
==== Section 1 ====
First round
Q	(Australia) T Kokkinakis	6	6
WC	(United States) B Holt	4	1
(Brazil) T Monteiro	6	5	2
PR	(Argentina) G Pella	3	7	6
Q	(Switzerland) L Riedi	1	1
(United Kingdom) J Draper	6	6
(Argentina) TM Etcheverry	7^{7}	1	4
(United Kingdom) A Murray	6^{5}	6	6

Second round
1	(Spain) C Alcaraz	6	6
Q	(Australia) T Kokkinakis	3	3
PR	(Argentina) G Pella	6^{3}	6^{4}
31	(Netherlands) T Griekspoor	7^{7}	7^{7}
24	(United Kingdom) D Evans	4	2
(United Kingdom) J Draper	6	6
(United Kingdom) A Murray	6	6
LL	(Moldova) R Albot	4	3

Third round
1	(Spain) C Alcaraz	7^{7}	6
31	(Netherlands) T Griekspoor	6^{4}	3
(United Kingdom) J Draper	7^{8}	6
(United Kingdom) A Murray	6^{6}	2

Fourth round
1	(Spain) C Alcaraz	6	2
(United Kingdom) J Draper	2	0^{r}

==== Section 2 ====
First round
LL	(Australia) A Popyrin	6	5	6
Q	(China) Z Zhang	4	7	1
Q	(Germany) J-L Struff	1	6	6
(France) Q Halys	6	3	3
(France) G Barrère	4	2
WC	(United States) J Sock	6	6
(Spain) P Martínez	7^{7}	3	6
(Switzerland) M-A Hüsler	6^{4}	6	4

Second round
9	(Poland) H Hurkacz	6	6
LL	(Australia) A Popyrin	3	3
Q	(Germany) J-L Struff	3	3
17	(United States) T Paul	6	6
27	(Argentina) F Cerúndolo	4	6	6
WC	(United States) J Sock	6	3	4
(Spain) P Martínez	6^{5}	4
8	(Canada) F Auger-Aliassime	7^{7}	6

Third round
9	(Poland) H Hurkacz	6	2	4
17	(United States) T Paul	4	6	6
27	(Argentina) F Cerúndolo	5	4
8	(Canada) F Auger-Aliassime	7	6

Fourth round
17	(United States) T Paul	6	3	6^{6}
8	(Canada) F Auger-Aliassime	3	6	7^{8}

==== Section 3 ====
First round
(United States) B Shelton	6	6
(Italy) F Fognini	4	1
(Sweden) M Ymer	4	5
Q	(Australia) R Hijikata	6	7
(Slovakia) A Molčan	6	6
(Spain) A Ramos Viñolas	3	2
(United States) JJ Wolf	6	0	3
(Hungary) M Fucsovics	1	6	6

Second round
4	(United States) T Fritz	4	6	6
(United States) B Shelton	6	4	3
Q	(Australia) R Hijikata	3	1
30	(Argentina) S Báez	6	6
18	(Croatia) B Ćorić	3	3
(Slovakia) A Molčan	6	6
(Hungary) M Fucsovics	6	6
16	(Australia) A de Minaur	4	2

Third round
4	(United States) T Fritz	6	6
30	(Argentina) S Báez	1	2
(Slovakia) A Molčan	4	2
(Hungary) M Fucsovics	6	6

Fourth round
4	(United States) T Fritz	6	6
(Hungary) M Fucsovics	4	3

==== Section 4 ====
First round
Q	(Croatia) B Gojo	4	7^{7}	2
(France) R Gasquet	6	6^{5}	6
WC	(Austria) D Thiem	6	4	6^{5}
(France) A Mannarino	4	6	7^{7}
PR	(Switzerland) S Wawrinka	6	1	6
Q	(Australia) A Vukic	4	6	1
(United States) M McDonald	6	6
(Serbia) F Krajinović	3	0

Second round
11	(Italy) J Sinner	6	7^{7}
(France) R Gasquet	3	6^{2}
(France) A Mannarino	6	6
19	(Italy) L Musetti	4	4
26	(Serbia) M Kecmanović	6^{8}	4
PR	(Switzerland) S Wawrinka	7^{10}	6
(United States) M McDonald	5	3
7	(Denmark) H Rune	7	6

Third round
11	(Italy) J Sinner	7^{9}	6
(France) A Mannarino	6^{7}	4
PR	(Switzerland) S Wawrinka	6	6^{5}	7
7	(Denmark) H Rune	2	7^{7}	5

Fourth round
11	(Italy) J Sinner	6	6
PR	(Switzerland) S Wawrinka	1	4

=== Bottom half ===
==== Section 5 ====
First round
(United States) J Isner	6^{7}	3
(United States) B Nakashima	7^{9}	6
I Ivashka	6	6
R Safiullin	4	2
(Finland) E Ruusuvuori	6	4
(France) C Lestienne	4	1^{r}
(Argentina) P Cachin	7	6
(Georgia (country)) N Basilashvili	5	3

Second round
5	D Medvedev	6	6
(United States) B Nakashima	4	3
I Ivashka	7	3
28	(Netherlands) B van de Zandschulp	5	2^{r}
22	(Spain) R Bautista Agut	6^{5}	2
(Finland) E Ruusuvuori	7^{7}	6
(Argentina) P Cachin	3	1
12	(Germany) A Zverev	6	6

Third round
5	D Medvedev	6	3	6
I Ivashka	2	6	1
(Finland) E Ruusuvuori	5	6	5
12	(Germany) A Zverev	7	1	7

Fourth round
5	D Medvedev	6^{5}	7^{7}	7
12	(Germany) A Zverev	7^{7}	6^{5}	5

==== Section 6 ====
First round
(Serbia) L Djere	3	5
(Germany) O Otte	6	7
WC	(China) Y Wu	6^{6}	6	7^{7}
(Spain) J Munar	7^{8}	0	6^{3}
(Colombia) DE Galán	4	2
Q	(Chile) C Garín	6	6
(Argentina) D Schwartzman	6	6
(Argentina) F Coria	1	2

Second round
13	K Khachanov	6	6
(Germany) O Otte	3	3
WC	(China) Y Wu	4	1
23	(Spain) A Davidovich Fokina	6	6
29	(Japan) Y Nishioka	4	0
Q	(Chile) C Garín	6	6
(Argentina) D Schwartzman	2	3
3	(Norway) C Ruud	6	6

Third round
13	K Khachanov	3	6	4
23	(Spain) A Davidovich Fokina	6	1	6
Q	(Chile) C Garín	6	7^{7}
3	(Norway) C Ruud	4	6^{2}

Fourth round
23	(Spain) A Davidovich Fokina	6	6
Q	(Chile) C Garín	3	4

==== Section 7 ====
First round
(Czech Republic) J Lehečka	7^{7}	7
(France) A Rinderknech	6^{4}	5
(Spain) B Zapata Miralles	2	6^{6}
(France) U Humbert	6	7^{8}
Q	(Japan) T Daniel	6	7
(Spain) R Carballés Baena	1	5
(Kazakhstan) A Bublik	4	4
Q	(Chinese Taipei) T-l Wu	6	6

Second round
6	A Rublev	6	6
(Czech Republic) J Lehečka	4	2
(France) U Humbert	7	6
25	(Canada) D Shapovalov	5	4
20	(Italy) M Berrettini	6^{5}	6	3
Q	(Japan) T Daniel	7^{7}	0	6
Q	(Chinese Taipei) T-l Wu	2	4
10	(United Kingdom) C Norrie	6	6

Third round
6	A Rublev	7	6
(France) U Humbert	5	3
Q	(Japan) T Daniel	7^{7}	5	2
10	(United Kingdom) C Norrie	6^{5}	7	6

Fourth round
6	A Rublev	2	4
10	(United Kingdom) C Norrie	6	6

==== Section 8 ====
First round
(United States) M Giron	6	7
WC	(United States) A Kovacevic	3	5
(Australia) J Kubler	6	7^{7}
(Italy) L Sonego	4	6^{4}
Q	(Chile) A Tabilo	6	6
Q	(Germany) M Marterer	4	3
(Australia) J Thompson	6	6
PR	(France) G Monfils	3	1

Second round
14	(United States) F Tiafoe	6	6
(United States) M Giron	2	2
(Australia) J Kubler	2	7^{7}	3
21	(Bulgaria) G Dimitrov	6	6^{5}	0^{r}
32	(United States) M Cressy	6^{3}	6^{13}
Q	(Chile) A Tabilo	7^{7}	7^{15}
(Australia) J Thompson	7^{7}	4	7^{7}
2	(Greece) S Tsitsipas	6^{0}	6	6^{5}

Third round
14	(United States) F Tiafoe	6	6
(Australia) J Kubler	3	2
Q	(Chile) A Tabilo	6	7^{8}
(Australia) J Thompson	3	6^{6}

Fourth round
14	(United States) F Tiafoe	6	6
Q	(Chile) A Tabilo	4	4

== Seeded players ==
The following are the seeded players. Seedings are based on ATP rankings as of March 6, 2023. Rankings and points before are as of March 6, 2023.

Seed	Rank	Player	Points before	Points defending	Points earned	Points after	Status
1	2	(Spain) Carlos Alcaraz	6,780	360	1,000	7,420	Champion, defeated Daniil Medvedev [5]
2	3	(Greece) Stefanos Tsitsipas	5,805	45	10	5,770	Second round lost to (Australia) Jordan Thompson
3	4	(Norway) Casper Ruud	5,560	45	45	5,560	Third round lost to (Chile) Cristian Garín [Q]
4	5	(United States) Taylor Fritz	3,795	1,000	180	2,975	Quarterfinals lost to (Italy) Jannik Sinner [11]
5	6	Daniil Medvedev	3,775	45	600	4,330	Runner-up, lost to (Spain) Carlos Alcaraz [1]
6	7	Andrey Rublev	3,660	360	90	3,390	Fourth round lost to (United Kingdom) Cameron Norrie [10]
7	8	(Denmark) Holger Rune	3,321	41	45	3,325	Third round lost to (Switzerland) Stan Wawrinka [PR]
8	10	(Canada) Félix Auger-Aliassime	3,245	10	180	3,415	Quarterfinals lost to (Spain) Carlos Alcaraz [1]
9	11	(Poland) Hubert Hurkacz	3,110	90	45	3,065	Third round lost to (United States) Tommy Paul [17]
10	12	(United Kingdom) Cameron Norrie	2,815	180	180	2,815	Quarterfinals lost to (United States) Frances Tiafoe [14]
11	13	(Italy) Jannik Sinner	2,655	90	360	2,925	Semifinals lost to (Spain) Carlos Alcaraz [1]
12	14	(Germany) Alexander Zverev	2,500	10	90	2,580	Fourth round lost to Daniil Medvedev [5]
13	15	Karen Khachanov	2,470	10	45	2,505	Third round lost to (Spain) Alejandro Davidovich Fokina [23]
14	16	(United States) Frances Tiafoe	2,395	45	360	2,710	Semifinals lost to Daniil Medvedev [5]
~~15~~	~~17~~	~~(Spain) Pablo Carreño Busta~~	2,240	10	0	2,230	Withdrew due to elbow injury
16	18	(Australia) Alex de Minaur	2,165	90	10	2,085	Second round lost to (Hungary) Márton Fucsovics
17	19	(United States) Tommy Paul	2,000	45	90	2,045	Fourth round lost to (Canada) Félix Auger-Aliassime [8]
18	20	(Croatia) Borna Ćorić	1,905	10	10	1,905	Second round lost to (Slovakia) Alex Molčan
19	21	(Italy) Lorenzo Musetti	1,855	25	10	1,840	Second round lost to (France) Adrian Mannarino
20	23	(Italy) Matteo Berrettini	1,780	90	10	1,700	Second round lost to (Japan) Taro Daniel [Q]
21	25	(Bulgaria) Grigor Dimitrov	1,620	180	10	1,450	Second round retired against (Australia) Jason Kubler
22	27	(Spain) Roberto Bautista Agut	1,465	45	10	1,430	Second round lost to (Finland) Emil Ruusuvuori
23	28	(Spain) Alejandro Davidovich Fokina	1,390	25	180	1,545	Quarterfinals lost to Daniil Medvedev [5]
24	29	(United Kingdom) Dan Evans	1,380	45	10	1,345	Second round lost to (United Kingdom) Jack Draper
25	30	(Canada) Denis Shapovalov	1,380	45	10	1,345	Second round lost to (France) Ugo Humbert
26	31	(Serbia) Miomir Kecmanović	1,290	180	10	1,120	Second round lost to (Switzerland) Stan Wawrinka [PR]
27	32	(Argentina) Francisco Cerúndolo	1,275	0	45	1,320	Third round lost to (Canada) Félix Auger-Aliassime [8]
28	33	(Netherlands) Botic van de Zandschulp	1,205	45	10	1,170	Second round retired against Ilya Ivashka
29	34	(Japan) Yoshihito Nishioka	1,142	8	10	1,144	Second round lost to (Chile) Cristian Garín [Q]
30	35	(Argentina) Sebastián Báez	1,135	10	45	1,170	Third round lost to (United States) Taylor Fritz [4]
31	36	(Netherlands) Tallon Griekspoor	1,034	10	45	1,069	Third round lost to (Spain) Carlos Alcaraz [1]
32	37	(United States) Maxime Cressy	1,016	10	10	1,016	Second round lost to (Chile) Alejandro Tabilo [Q]

=== Withdrawn players ===
The following players would have been seeded, but withdrew before the tournament began.

Rank	Player	Points before	Points dropped	Points after	Withdrawal reason
1	(Serbia) Novak Djokovic	7,160	0	7,160	Vaccination requirements not met
9	(Spain) Rafael Nadal	3,315	600	2,715	Left leg injury
22	(Australia) Nick Kyrgios	1,825	180	1,645	Left knee injury
24	(Croatia) Marin Čilić	1,745	10	1,735	Knee injury
26	(United States) Sebastian Korda	1,550	25	1,525	Right wrist injury

== Other entry information ==
=== Wildcards ===
- (United States) Brandon Holt
- (United States) Aleksandar Kovacevic
- (United States) Jack Sock
- (Austria) Dominic Thiem
- (China) Wu Yibing

=== Protected ranking ===
- (France) Gaël Monfils
- (Argentina) Guido Pella
- (Switzerland) Stan Wawrinka

=== Withdrawals ===
- (France) Benjamin Bonzi → replaced by (Germany) Oscar Otte
- (United States) Jenson Brooksby → replaced by (France) Ugo Humbert
- (Spain) Pablo Carreño Busta → replaced by (Moldova) Radu Albot
- (Croatia) Marin Čilić → replaced by (Argentina) Tomás Martín Etcheverry
- (Serbia) Novak Djokovic → replaced by (Georgia (country)) Nikoloz Basilashvili
- (United Kingdom) Kyle Edmund → replaced by Roman Safiullin
- (Belgium) David Goffin → replaced by (Australia) Jason Kubler
- (United States) Sebastian Korda → replaced by (Brazil) Thiago Monteiro
- (South Korea) Kwon Soon-woo → replaced by (Australia) Alexei Popyrin
- (Australia) Nick Kyrgios → replaced by (Spain) Roberto Carballés Baena
- (France) Corentin Moutet → replaced by (Colombia) Daniel Elahi Galán
- (Spain) Rafael Nadal → replaced by (Australia) Jordan Thompson
- (United States) Reilly Opelka → replaced by (Spain) Bernabé Zapata Miralles

== Qualifying ==
=== Seeds ===
1. (Serbia) Dušan Lajović (first round, retired)
2. (Portugal) Nuno Borges (first round)
3. (United States) Denis Kudla (first round)
4. (Ecuador) Emilio Gómez (first round)
5. (Australia) Christopher O'Connell (first round)
6. (China) Zhang Zhizhen (qualified)
7. (Australia) Alexei Popyrin (qualifying competition, lucky loser)
8. (Chile) Cristian Garín (qualified)
9. (Australia) Thanasi Kokkinakis (qualified)
10. (United States) Christopher Eubanks (first round)
11. (Moldova) Radu Albot (qualifying competition, lucky loser)
12. (Italy) Francesco Passaro (qualifying competition, retired)
13. (Italy) Matteo Arnaldi (qualifying competition)
14. (Japan) Yosuke Watanuki (first round)
15. Alexander Shevchenko (first round)
16. (Australia) Rinky Hijikata (qualified)
17. (Japan) Taro Daniel (qualified)
18. (Croatia) Borna Gojo (qualified)
19. (Switzerland) Leandro Riedi (qualified)
20. (Czech Republic) Tomáš Macháč (withdrew)
21. (United States) Steve Johnson (first round)
22. (Germany) Jan-Lennard Struff (qualified)
23. Pavel Kotov (first round)
24. (Austria) Filip Misolic (qualifying competition)

=== Qualifiers ===
1. (Australia) Rinky Hijikata
2. (Croatia) Borna Gojo
3. (Switzerland) Leandro Riedi
4. (Australia) Aleksandar Vukic
5. (Chile) Alejandro Tabilo
6. (China) Zhang Zhizhen
7. (Japan) Taro Daniel
8. (Chile) Cristian Garín
9. (Australia) Thanasi Kokkinakis
10. (Germany) Maximilian Marterer
11. (Germany) Jan-Lennard Struff
12. (Chinese Taipei) Wu Tung-lin

=== Lucky losers ===
1. (Australia) Alexei Popyrin
2. (Moldova) Radu Albot

=== Qualifying draw ===
==== First qualifier ====
First round
1	(Serbia) Dušan Lajović	2	1^{r}
WC	(United States) Tennys Sandgren	6	4
(Brazil) Felipe Meligeni Alves	4	0^{r}
16	(Australia) Rinky Hijikata	6	4

Qualifying competition
WC	(United States) Tennys Sandgren	3	3
16	(Australia) Rinky Hijikata	6	6

==== Second qualifier ====
First round
2	(Portugal) Nuno Borges	6	3	2
(Spain) Pablo Andújar	3	6	6
(Argentina) Andrea Collarini	2	2
18	(Croatia) Borna Gojo	6	6

Qualifying competition
(Spain) Pablo Andújar	1	4
18	(Croatia) Borna Gojo	6	6

==== Third qualifier ====
First round
3	(United States) Denis Kudla	4	6	5
(France) Alexandre Müller	6	1	7
WC	(United States) Alex Michelsen	3	7^{8}	2
19	(Switzerland) Leandro Riedi	6	6^{6}	6

Qualifying competition
(France) Alexandre Müller	4	1
19	(Switzerland) Leandro Riedi	6	6

==== Fourth qualifier ====
First round
4	(Ecuador) Emilio Gómez	2	6	2
(Australia) Aleksandar Vukic	6	2	6
PR	(Italy) Roberto Marcora	6	6
Alt	(United States) Stefan Kozlov	1	3

Qualifying competition
(Australia) Aleksandar Vukic	6	6
PR	(Italy) Roberto Marcora	3	1

==== Fifth qualifier ====
First round
5	(Australia) Christopher O'Connell	3	7	5
(Chile) Alejandro Tabilo	6	5	7
WC	(United States) Zachary Svajda	4	6	7^{7}
21	(United States) Steve Johnson	6	4	6^{4}

Qualifying competition
(Chile) Alejandro Tabilo	6	4	6
WC	(United States) Zachary Svajda	3	6	4

==== Sixth qualifier ====
First round
6	(China) Zhang Zhizhen	6	7^{8}
(Sweden) Elias Ymer	3	6^{6}
(China) Shang Juncheng	7^{7}	7^{7}
14	(Japan) Yosuke Watanuki	6^{1}	6^{3}

Qualifying competition
6	(China) Zhang Zhizhen	6^{10}	6	7^{7}
(China) Shang Juncheng	7^{12}	3	6^{5}

==== Seventh qualifier ====
First round
7	(Australia) Alexei Popyrin	6	7^{7}
PR	(United States) Bradley Klahn	4	6^{3}
(Dominican Republic) Nick Hardt	7	1	4
17	(Japan) Taro Daniel	5	6	6

Qualifying competition
7	(Australia) Alexei Popyrin	4	6	1
17	(Japan) Taro Daniel	6	4	6

==== Eighth qualifier ====
First round
8	(Chile) Cristian Garín	7	7^{9}
WC	(United States) Learner Tien	5	6^{7}
(Portugal) João Sousa	6^{8}	6	3
24	(Austria) Filip Misolic	7^{10}	2	6

Qualifying competition
8	(Chile) Cristian Garín	6	6
24	(Austria) Filip Misolic	4	2

==== Ninth qualifier ====
First round
9	(Australia) Thanasi Kokkinakis	7^{7}	6
PR	(Japan) Yūichi Sugita	6^{5}	3
(South Africa) Lloyd Harris	4	3
13	(Italy) Matteo Arnaldi	6	6

Qualifying competition
9	(Australia) Thanasi Kokkinakis	6	6
13	(Italy) Matteo Arnaldi	4	4

==== Tenth qualifier ====
First round
10	(United States) Christopher Eubanks	6	5	3
(Germany) Maximilian Marterer	4	7	6
(United States) Emilio Nava	7	6^{2}	6
23	Pavel Kotov	5	7^{7}	3

Qualifying competition
(Germany) Maximilian Marterer	6	7^{7}
(United States) Emilio Nava	1	6^{4}

==== Eleventh qualifier ====
First round
11	(Moldova) Radu Albot	6	6
(Italy) Mattia Bellucci	3	4
(France) Geoffrey Blancaneaux	4	2
22	(Germany) Jan-Lennard Struff	6	6

Qualifying competition
11	(Moldova) Radu Albot	6^{4}	3
22	(Germany) Jan-Lennard Struff	7^{7}	6

==== Twelfth qualifier ====
First round
12	(Italy) Francesco Passaro	6	4	6
WC	(United States) Mitchell Krueger	4	6	0
(Chinese Taipei) Wu Tung-lin	6	6^{5}	6
15	Alexander Shevchenko	2	7^{7}	3

Qualifying competition
12	(Italy) Francesco Passaro	2	0^{r}
(Chinese Taipei) Wu Tung-lin	6	3
