= 2021 Singapore Tennis Open =

- Date: 22–28 February
- Edition: 1st
- Category: ATP Tour 250
- Draw: 28S / 16D
- Prize money: $361,800
- Surface: Hard (indoor)
- Location: Singapore, Singapore
- Venue: OCBC Arena

Champions

Singles
- (Australia) Alexei Popyrin

Doubles
- (Belgium) Sander Gillé/ (Belgium) Joran Vliegen
| ATP Singapore Open |

The 2021 Singapore Tennis Open is a tournament on the 2021 ATP Tour. It is played on indoor hard courts in Singapore. It is organised with a single-year licence in 2021, and was held at OCBC Arena in Singapore from February 22 to February 28, 2021.

== Finals ==
=== Singles ===
- (Australia) Alexei Popyrin def. (Kazakhstan) Alexander Bublik, 4–6, 6–0, 6–2.

=== Doubles ===
- (Belgium) Sander Gillé / (Belgium) Joran Vliegen def. (Australia) Matthew Ebden / (Australia) John-Patrick Smith, 6–2, 6–3.

== Points and prize money ==
=== Point distribution ===
| Event | W | F | SF | QF | Round of 16 | Round of 32 | Q | Q2 | Q1 |
| Singles | 250 | 150 | 90 | 45 | 20 | 0 | 12 | 6 | 0 |
| Doubles | 250 | 150 | 90 | 45 | 0 | — | — | — | — |

=== Prize money ===
| Event | W | F | SF | QF | Round of 16 | Round of 32 | Q2 | Q1 |
| Singles | $24,770 | $18,310 | $13,730 | $9,385 | $6,410 | $4,575 | $2,345 | $1,295 |
| Doubles* | $8,630 | $6,330 | $4,810 | $3,440 | $2,520 | — | — | — |

_{*per team}

== Singles main-draw entrants ==
=== Seeds ===
| Country | Player | Rank^{1} | Seed |
|---|---|---|---|
| FRA | Adrian Mannarino | 36 | 1 |
| AUS | John Millman | 39 | 2 |
| CRO | Marin Čilić | 43 | 3 |
| KAZ | Alexander Bublik | 45 | 4 |
| JPN | Yoshihito Nishioka | 58 | 5 |
| MDA | Radu Albot | 85 | 6 |
| RSA | Lloyd Harris | 91 | 7 |
| KOR | Kwon Soon-woo | 97 | 8 |

- ^{1} Rankings are as of February 15, 2021

=== Other entrants ===
The following players received wildcards into the main draw:

- (Bulgaria) Adrian Andreev
- (Australia) Matthew Ebden
- (Japan) Shintaro Mochizuki

The following player received an entry using a protected ranking into the main draw:

- (India) Yuki Bhambri

The following players received entry from the qualifying draw:

- (Turkey) Altuğ Çelikbilek
- (United States) Christopher Eubanks
- (United States) Thai-Son Kwiatkowski
- (Australia) John-Patrick Smith

=== Withdrawals ===
- (Canada) Félix Auger-Aliassime → replaced by (Australia) Alexei Popyrin
- (Lithuania) Ričardas Berankis → replaced by (Australia) Marc Polmans
- (France) Jérémy Chardy → replaced by (Latvia) Ernests Gulbis
- (United Kingdom) Daniel Evans → replaced by (Japan) Yasutaka Uchiyama
- (United Kingdom) Cameron Norrie → replaced by (Japan) Taro Daniel
- (Canada) Vasek Pospisil → replaced by (Australia) James Duckworth
- (Norway) Casper Ruud → replaced by (Chinese Taipei) Jason Jung
- (Finland) Emil Ruusuvuori → replaced by (Italy) Roberto Marcora
- (Japan) Yūichi Sugita → replaced by (India) Yuki Bhambri
- (Italy) Stefano Travaglia → replaced by (United States) Maxime Cressy

== Doubles main-draw entrants ==
=== Seeds ===
| Country | Player | Country | Player | Rank^{1} | Seed |
|---|---|---|---|---|---|
| BEL | Sander Gillé | BEL | Joran Vliegen | 77 | 1 |
| IND | Rohan Bopanna | JPN | Ben McLachlan | 89 | 2 |
| GBR | Luke Bambridge | GBR | Dominic Inglot | 111 | 3 |
| AUS | Matthew Ebden | AUS | John-Patrick Smith | 151 | 4 |

- Rankings are as of February 15, 2021.

=== Other entrants ===
The following pairs received wildcards into the doubles main draw:

- (Singapore) Shaheed Alam / (Singapore) Roy Hobbs
- (United States) James Cerretani / (Canada) Adil Shamasdin

=== Withdrawals ===
Before the tournament

- (United Kingdom) Dan Evans / (United Kingdom) Lloyd Glasspool → replaced by (India) Purav Raja / (India) Ramkumar Ramanathan
- (Moldova) Radu Albot / (Lithuania) Ričardas Berankis → replaced by (United States) Robert Galloway / (United States) Alex Lawson
- (Finland) Harri Heliövaara / (Finland) Emil Ruusuvuori → replaced by (Japan) Taro Daniel / (Chinese Taipei) Jason Jung
- (South Africa) Lloyd Harris / (Italy) Stefano Travaglia → replaced by (United States) Evan King / (United States) Hunter Reese
- (France) Jérémy Chardy / (France) Fabrice Martin → replaced by (India) Sriram Balaji / (Switzerland) Luca Margaroli
- (Philippines) Treat Huey / (Indonesia) Christopher Rungkat → replaced by (United States) Thai-Son Kwiatkowski / (United States) Christopher Eubanks

During the tournament

- (South Korea) Kwon Soon-woo / (Japan) Yasutaka Uchiyama
