= 2023 BNP Paribas Open – Men's doubles =

Men's doubles
- 2023 BNP Paribas Open

Final
- Champions: (India) Rohan Bopanna (Australia) Matthew Ebden
- Runners-up: (Netherlands) Wesley Koolhof (United Kingdom) Neal Skupski
- Score: 6–3, 2–6, [10–8]

Details
- Draw: 32 (3 WC)
- Seeds: 8

Events
Singles	men	women
Doubles	men	women
← 2022 ·	BNP Paribas Open	· 2024 →

Rohan Bopanna and Matthew Ebden defeated Wesley Koolhof and Neal Skupski in the final, 6–3, 2–6, [10–8], to win the men's doubles tennis title at the 2023 Indian Wells Masters. At the age of 43, Bopanna overtook Daniel Nestor to become the oldest ATP Masters 1000 finalist and champion, winning his fifth Masters 1000 title and 24th career ATP Tour doubles title overall. It was Ebden's first Masters 1000 title and ninth career doubles title.

John Isner and Jack Sock were the defending champions, but lost in the semifinals to Bopanna and Ebden.

Koolhof, Skupski, and Rajeev Ram were in contention for the ATP no. 1 doubles ranking. Koolhof and Skupski retained the top ranking after Ram lost in the first round.

== Seeds ==
1. (Netherlands) Wesley Koolhof / (United Kingdom) Neal Skupski (final)
2. (United States) Rajeev Ram / (United Kingdom) Joe Salisbury (first round)
3. (El Salvador) Marcelo Arévalo / (Netherlands) Jean-Julien Rojer (first round)
4. (Croatia) Nikola Mektić / (Croatia) Mate Pavić (second round)
5. (United Kingdom) Lloyd Glasspool / (Finland) Harri Heliövaara (quarterfinals)
6. (Spain) Marcel Granollers / (Argentina) Horacio Zeballos (first round)
7. (Monaco) Hugo Nys / (Poland) Jan Zieliński (first round)
8. (Colombia) Juan Sebastián Cabal / (Colombia) Robert Farah (first round)

== Draw ==
=== Key ===
- Q = Qualifier
- WC = Wild card
- LL = Lucky loser
- Alt = Alternate
- ITF = ITF entry
- PR = Protected ranking
- SR = Special ranking
- SE = Special exempt
- JE = Junior exempt
- JR = Junior Accelerator Programme entrant
- CO = College Accelerator Programme entrant
- NG = Next Gen Accelerator Program entrant
- w/o = Walkover
- r = Retired
- d = Defaulted

=== Finals ===
Semifinals
1	(Netherlands) Wesley Koolhof (United Kingdom) Neal Skupski	6	4	[10]
(Mexico) Santiago González (France) Édouard Roger-Vasselin	3	6	[5]
(United States) John Isner (United States) Jack Sock	6^{6}	6^{2}
(India) Rohan Bopanna (Australia) Matthew Ebden	7^{8}	7^{7}

Final
1	(Netherlands) Wesley Koolhof (United Kingdom) Neal Skupski	3	6	[8]
(India) Rohan Bopanna (Australia) Matthew Ebden	6	2	[10]

=== Top half ===
First round
1	(Netherlands) W Koolhof (United Kingdom) N Skupski	6	6
(Brazil) M Melo (Germany) A Zverev	3	1
PR	(United States) F Tiafoe (Switzerland) S Wawrinka	w/o
Alt	(Argentina) F Cerúndolo (Argentina) D Schwartzman
(United States) T Fritz (United States) T Paul	3	3
(United Kingdom) D Evans (Australia) J Peers	6	6
(United Kingdom) J Murray (New Zealand) M Venus	6	6
6	(Spain) M Granollers (Argentina) H Zeballos	3	4
4	(Croatia) N Mektić (Croatia) M Pavić	6	6
PR	(Norway) C Ruud (Austria) D Thiem	3	3
(Mexico) S González (France) É Roger-Vasselin	7	6
WC	(United States) N Lammons (United States) J Withrow	5	4
WC	(United States) M Giron (United States) JJ Wolf	7^{7}	6^{7}	[10]
WC	(Italy) J Sinner (Italy) L Sonego	6^{4}	7^{9}	[1]
(Netherlands) M Middelkoop (Netherlands) B van de Zandschulp	3	6	[6]
5	(United Kingdom) L Glasspool (Finland) H Heliövaara	6	3	[10]

Second round
1	(Netherlands) W Koolhof (United Kingdom) N Skupski	w/o
PR	(United States) F Tiafoe (Switzerland) S Wawrinka
(United Kingdom) D Evans (Australia) J Peers	6	6^{3}	[6]
(United Kingdom) J Murray (New Zealand) M Venus	3	7^{7}	[10]
4	(Croatia) N Mektić (Croatia) M Pavić	7^{10}	6^{5}	[9]
(Mexico) S González (France) É Roger-Vasselin	6^{8}	7^{7}	[11]
WC	(United States) M Giron (United States) JJ Wolf	2	3
5	(United Kingdom) L Glasspool (Finland) H Heliövaara	6	6

Quarterfinals
1	(Netherlands) W Koolhof (United Kingdom) N Skupski	6	6
(United Kingdom) J Murray (New Zealand) M Venus	3	3
(Mexico) S González (France) É Roger-Vasselin	2	6	[10]
5	(United Kingdom) L Glasspool (Finland) H Heliövaara	6	2	7

Semifinals
1	(Netherlands) W Koolhof (United Kingdom) N Skupski	6	4	[10]
(Mexico) S González (France) É Roger-Vasselin	3	6	[5]

=== Bottom half ===
First round
8	(Colombia) JS Cabal (Colombia) R Farah	7^{7}	4	[3]
(Italy) S Bolelli (Italy) F Fognini	6^{1}	6	[10]
(Australia) R Hijikata (Australia) J Kubler	1	3
(United States) A Krajicek (United States) M McDonald	6	6
K Khachanov; A Rublev	3	4
(Germany) K Krawietz (France) F Martin	6	6
(United States) J Isner (United States) J Sock	6^{6}	7	[10]
3	(El Salvador) M Arévalo (Netherlands) J-J Rojer	7^{8}	5	[7]
7	(Monaco) H Nys (Poland) J Zieliński	6	3	[6]
(Austria) L Miedler (United Kingdom) C Norrie	3	6	[10]
(Canada) F Auger-Aliassime (Canada) D Shapovalov	6	6
(Denmark) H Rune (United States) B Shelton	1	3
(Brazil) R Matos (Spain) D Vega Hernández	5	6	[6]
(India) R Bopanna (Australia) M Ebden	7	3	[10]
(Bulgaria) G Dimitrov (Poland) H Hurkacz	7^{7}	6
2	(United States) R Ram (United Kingdom) J Salisbury	6^{2}	4

Second round
(Italy) S Bolelli (Italy) F Fognini	1	6	[10]
(United States) A Krajicek (United States) M McDonald	6	3	[5]
(Germany) K Krawietz (France) F Martin	6^{8}	4
(United States) J Isner (United States) J Sock	7^{10}	6
(Austria) L Miedler (United Kingdom) C Norrie
(Canada) F Auger-Aliassime (Canada) D Shapovalov	w/o
(India) R Bopanna (Australia) M Ebden	w/o
(Bulgaria) G Dimitrov (Poland) H Hurkacz

Quarterfinals
(Italy) S Bolelli (Italy) F Fognini	2	4
(United States) J Isner (United States) J Sock	6	6
(Canada) F Auger-Aliassime (Canada) D Shapovalov	4	5
(India) R Bopanna (Australia) M Ebden	6	7

Semifinals
(United States) J Isner (United States) J Sock	6^{6}	6^{2}
(India) R Bopanna (Australia) M Ebden	7^{8}	7^{7}

== Seeded teams ==
The following are the seeded teams, based on ATP rankings as of March 6, 2023.

Country	Player	Country	Player	Rank	Seed
NED	Wesley Koolhof	GBR	Neal Skupski	2	1
USA	Rajeev Ram	GBR	Joe Salisbury	7	2
ESA	Marcelo Arévalo	NED	Jean-Julien Rojer	12	3
CRO	Nikola Mektić	CRO	Mate Pavić	13	4
GBR	Lloyd Glasspool	FIN	Harri Heliövaara	23	5
ESP	Marcel Granollers	ARG	Horacio Zeballos	29	6
MON	Hugo Nys	POL	Jan Zieliński	33	7
COL	Juan Sebastián Cabal	COL	Robert Farah	47	8

== Other entry information ==
=== Wildcards ===
- (United States) Marcos Giron / (United States) J. J. Wolf
- (United States) Nathaniel Lammons / (United States) Jackson Withrow
- (Italy) Jannik Sinner / (Italy) Lorenzo Sonego

=== Protected ranking ===
- (Norway) Casper Ruud / (Austria) Dominic Thiem
- (United States) Frances Tiafoe / (Switzerland) Stan Wawrinka

=== Alternates ===
- (Argentina) Francisco Cerúndolo / (Argentina) Diego Schwartzman

=== Withdrawals ===
- (Canada) Félix Auger-Aliassime / (United States) Sebastian Korda → replaced by (Canada) Félix Auger-Aliassime / (Canada) Denis Shapovalov
- (Spain) Roberto Bautista Agut / (Spain) Pablo Carreño Busta → replaced by (Argentina) Francisco Cerúndolo / (Argentina) Diego Schwartzman
- (Croatia) Ivan Dodig / (United States) Austin Krajicek → replaced by (United States) Austin Krajicek / (United States) Mackenzie McDonald
