= 2021 Singapore Tennis Open – Singles =

Singles
- 2021 Singapore Tennis Open

Final
- Champion: (Australia) Alexei Popyrin
- Runner-up: (Kazakhstan) Alexander Bublik
- Score: 4–6, 6–0, 6–2

Details
- Draw: 28 (4 Q / 3 WC )
- Seeds: 8

Events
Singles	Doubles
Singapore Tennis Open	· 2022 →

Alexei Popyrin defeated Alexander Bublik 4–6, 6–0, 6–2 to claim his first ATP Tour Men's Singles tennis title at the 2021 Singapore Open. The Singapore Tennis Open was a new addition to the ATP Tour in 2021

== Seeds ==
The top four seeds receive a bye into the second round.

1. (France) Adrian Mannarino (quarterfinals)
2. (Australia) John Millman (second round)
3. (Croatia) Marin Čilić (semifinals)
4. (Kazakhstan) Alexander Bublik (final)
5. (Japan) Yoshihito Nishioka (quarterfinals)
6. (Moldova) Radu Albot (semifinals)
7. (South Africa) Lloyd Harris (first round)
8. (South Korea) Kwon Soon-woo (quarterfinals)

== Draw ==
=== Key ===
- Q = Qualifier
- WC = Wild card
- LL = Lucky loser
- Alt = Alternate
- SE = Special exempt
- PR = Protected ranking
- ITF = ITF entry
- JE = Junior exempt
- w/o = Walkover
- r = Retired
- d = Defaulted
- SR = Special ranking

=== Finals ===
Semifinals
6	(Moldova) Radu Albot	6	3	4
4	(Kazakhstan) Alexander Bublik	2	6	6
3	(Croatia) Marin Čilić	6^{5}	6^{2}
(Australia) Alexei Popyrin	7^{7}	7^{7}

Final
4	(Kazakhstan) Alexander Bublik	6	0	2
(Australia) Alexei Popyrin	4	6	6

=== Top half ===
First round
(Italy) R Marcora	7	6
(Latvia) E Gulbis	5	4
(Australia) J Duckworth	2	4
(Germany) Y Hanfmann	6	6
Q	(Australia) J-P Smith	2	6	1
6	(Moldova) R Albot	6	3	6
WC	(Japan) S Mochizuki	0	4
Q	(Turkey) A Çelikbilek	6	6
(Chinese Taipei) J Jung	6^{4}	2
(United States) M Cressy	7^{7}	6
(United States) M Mmoh	2	6	3
5	(Japan) Y Nishioka	6	3	6

Second round
1	(France) A Mannarino	6	7
(Italy) R Marcora	3	5
(Germany) Y Hanfmann	7^{7}	6^{7}	3
6	(Moldova) R Albot	6^{2}	7^{9}	6
4	(Kazakhstan) A Bublik	6	6
Q	(Turkey) A Çelikbilek	2	2
(United States) M Cressy	4	2
5	(Japan) Y Nishioka	6	6

Quarterfinals
1	(France) A Mannarino	3	4
6	(Moldova) R Albot	6	6
4	(Kazakhstan) A Bublik	6	6
5	(Japan) Y Nishioka	3	2

Semifinals
6	(Moldova) R Albot	6	3	4
4	(Kazakhstan) A Bublik	2	6	6

=== Bottom half ===
First round
8	(South Korea) S-w Kwon	4	6	6
Q	(United States) T-S Kwiatkowski	6	3	4
(Japan) Y Uchiyama	6	2	6
(Australia) M Polmans	4	6	4
(Japan) T Daniel	6	6^{3}	6
(India) R Ramanathan	3	7^{7}	3
7	(South Africa) L Harris	6	3	4
WC	(Bulgaria) A Andreev	1	6	6
Q	(United States) C Eubanks	6^{5}	6^{5}
(Australia) A Popyrin	7^{7}	7^{7}
PR	(India) Y Bhambri	3	6^{3}
WC	(Australia) M Ebden	6	7^{7}

Second round
8	(South Korea) S-w Kwon	6	6
(Japan) Y Uchiyama	3	4
(Japan) T Daniel	5	4
3	(Croatia) M Čilić	7	6
WC	(Bulgaria) A Andreev	1	7	3
(Australia) A Popyrin	6	5	6
WC	(Australia) M Ebden	6	6
2	(Australia) J Millman	4	1

Quarterfinals
8	(South Korea) S-w Kwon	2	6	5
3	(Croatia) M Čilić	6	2	7
(Australia) A Popyrin	6	7^{9}
WC	(Australia) M Ebden	4	6^{7}

Semifinals
3	(Croatia) M Čilić	6^{5}	6^{2}
(Australia) A Popyrin	7^{7}	7^{7}

== Qualifying ==
=== Seeds ===
1. (United States) Thai-Son Kwiatkowski (qualified)
2. (Italy) Matteo Viola (qualifying competition)
3. (United States) Christopher Eubanks (qualified)
4. (Tunisia) Malek Jaziri (qualifying competition)
5. (Turkey) Altuğ Çelikbilek (qualified)
6. (Australia) John-Patrick Smith (qualified)
7. (Italy) Alessandro Bega (qualifying competition)
8. (Ukraine) Vladyslav Orlov (first round)

=== Qualifiers ===
1. (United States) Thai-Son Kwiatkowski
2. (Turkey) Altuğ Çelikbilek
3. (United States) Christopher Eubanks
4. (Australia) John-Patrick Smith

=== Qualifying draw ===
==== First qualifier ====
First round
1	(United States) Thai-Son Kwiatkowski	6	7^{7}
Alt	(United Kingdom) Luke Bambridge	4	6^{4}
Alt	(United States) Robert Galloway	6	6
8	(Ukraine) Vladyslav Orlov	4	4

Qualifying competition
1	(United States) Thai-Son Kwiatkowski	6	6
Alt	(United States) Robert Galloway	2	3

==== Second qualifier ====
First round
2	(Italy) Matteo Viola	6	6
Alt	(United States) Alex Lawson	3	2
(United States) Evan King	2	4
5	(Turkey) Altuğ Çelikbilek	6	6

Qualifying competition
2	(Italy) Matteo Viola	2	6	6^{5}
5	(Turkey) Altuğ Çelikbilek	6	0	7^{7}

==== Third qualifier ====
First round
3	(United States) Christopher Eubanks	6	6
Alt	(India) Rohan Bopanna	3	4
(Italy) Fabrizio Ornago	5	2
7	(Italy) Alessandro Bega	7	6

Qualifying competition
3	(United States) Christopher Eubanks	6	6
7	(Italy) Alessandro Bega	1	2

==== Fourth qualifier ====
First round
4	(Tunisia) Malek Jaziri	6	6
WC	(Singapore) Shaheed Alam	1	3
WC	(Singapore) Roy Hobbs	1	1
6	(Australia) John-Patrick Smith	6	6

Qualifying competition
4	(Tunisia) Malek Jaziri	5	6^{5}
6	(Australia) John-Patrick Smith	7	7^{7}
