= 2024 Monterrey Open – Singles =

Singles
- 2024 Monterrey Open

Final
- Champion: (Czech Republic) Linda Nosková
- Runner-up: (New Zealand) Lulu Sun
- Score: 7–6^{(8–6)}, 6–4

Details
- Draw: 28
- Seeds: 8

Events
| Singles | Doubles |
| ← 2023 · | Monterrey Open | · 2025 → |

Linda Nosková defeated Lulu Sun in the final, 7–6^{(8–6)}, 6–4 to win the singles tennis title at the 2024 Monterrey Open. Nosková did not drop a set en route to her first career WTA Tour level title. Sun became the first New Zealander to reach a tour level quarterfinal and beyond since Marina Erakovic in 2016.

Donna Vekić was the reigning champion, when the event was a WTA 250 level, but withdrew before the tournament began.

== Seeds ==
The top four seeds received a bye into the second round.

1. (United States) Danielle Collins (second round)
2. (United States) Emma Navarro (semifinals)
3. Ekaterina Alexandrova (semifinals)
4. Anastasia Pavlyuchenkova (withdrew)
5. (Ukraine) Elina Svitolina (quarterfinals)
6. (Czech Republic) Linda Nosková (champion)
7. (China) Yuan Yue (quarterfinals)
8. Veronika Kudermetova (first round)
9. (Poland) Magdalena Fręch (quarterfinals)

== Draw ==
=== Key ===
- Q = Qualifier
- WC = Wild card
- LL = Lucky loser
- Alt = Alternate
- ITF = ITF entry
- PR = Protected ranking
- SR = Special ranking
- SE = Special exempt
- JE = Junior exempt
- JR = Junior Accelerator Programme entrant
- CO = College Accelerator Programme entrant
- NG = Next Gen Accelerator Program entrant
- w/o = Walkover
- r = Retired
- d = Defaulted

=== Finals ===
Semifinals
(New Zealand) Lulu Sun | 7 | 3 | 7^{8}
3 | Ekaterina Alexandrova | 5 | 6 | 6^{6}
6 | (Czech Republic) Linda Nosková | 7^{9} | 7
2 | (United States) Emma Navarro | 6^{7} | 5

Final
(New Zealand) Lulu Sun | 6^{6} | 4
6 | (Czech Republic) Linda Nosková | 7^{8} | 6

=== Top half ===
First round
E Andreeva | 6 | 6
(Ukraine) A Kalinina | 1 | 4
(France) C Paquet | 6^{3} | 3
(New Zealand) L Sun | 7^{7} | 6
(Argentina) ML Carlé | 1 | 7 | 6
8 | V Kudermetova | 6 | 5 | 4
WC | (Mexico) V Rodríguez | 1 | 4
(Mexico) R Zarazúa | 6 | 6
Q | (Canada) C Zhao | 6^{2} | 6 | 2
(Croatia) P Martić | 7^{7} | 3 | 6
Q | (Serbia) A Krunić | 6 | 2 | 3
7 | (China) Y Yuan | 4 | 6 | 6

Second round
1 | (United States) D Collins | 6 | 3 | 3
E Andreeva | 1 | 6 | 6
(New Zealand) L Sun | 6 | 2 | 7^{7}
(Argentina) ML Carlé | 3 | 6 | 6^{2}
3 | E Alexandrova | 6 | 6
(Mexico) R Zarazúa | 3 | 4
(Croatia) P Martić | 4 | 1
7 | (China) Y Yuan | 6 | 6

Quarterfinals
E Andreeva | 4 | 3
(New Zealand) L Sun | 6 | 6
3 | E Alexandrova | 7 | 7^{7}
7 | (China) Y Yuan | 5 | 6^{3}

Semifinals
(New Zealand) L Sun | 7 | 3 | 7^{8}
3 | E Alexandrova | 5 | 6 | 6^{6}

=== Bottom half ===
First round
6 | (Czech Republic) L Nosková | 6 | 6
Q | (Kazakhstan) A Danilina | 0 | 1
(China) Xiy Wang | 6 | 6
(Germany) T Maria | 0 | 3
(Armenia) E Avanesyan | 7^{8} | 6
WC | (Italy) E Cocciaretto | 6^{6} | 1
9 | (Poland) M Fręch | 6 | 4 | 6
(Argentina) N Podoroska | 4 | 6 | 4
LL | (Israel) L Glushko | 6 | 3 | 6
Q | (Ukraine) K Volodko | 3 | 6 | 3
(Colombia) C Osorio | 6 | 7^{7}
(Australia) A Tomljanović | 2 | 6^{3}

Second round
6 | (Czech Republic) L Nosková | 6 | 7^{13}
(China) Xiy Wang | 4 | 6^{11}
(Armenia) E Avanesyan | 4 | 3
5 | (Ukraine) E Svitolina | 6 | 6
9 | (Poland) M Fręch | 6^{2} | 6 | 6
LL | (Israel) L Glushko | 7^{7} | 3 | 1
(Colombia) C Osorio | 6 | 5 | 6^{2}
2 | (United States) E Navarro | 3 | 7 | 7^{7}

Quarterfinals
6 | (Czech Republic) L Nosková | 6 | 6
5 | (Ukraine) E Svitolina | 4 | 4
9 | (Poland) M Fręch | 7^{7} | 0 | 2
2 | (United States) E Navarro | 6^{3} | 6 | 6

Semifinals
6 | (Czech Republic) L Nosková | 7^{9} | 7
2 | (United States) E Navarro | 6^{7} | 5

== Qualifying ==
=== Seeds ===
1. (France) Chloé Paquet (moved to main draw)
2. (Australia) Ajla Tomljanović (moved to main draw)
3. (France) Amandine Hesse (qualifying competition)
4. (Hungary) Tímea Babos (first round)
5. (Canada) Carol Zhao (qualified)
6. (Israel) Lina Glushko (qualifying competition, lucky loser)
7. (Serbia) Natalija Stevanović (first round, retired)
8. (Ukraine) Kateryna Baindl (qualifying competition)

=== Qualifiers ===
1. (Kazakhstan) Anna Danilina
2. (Ukraine) Kateryna Volodko
3. (Canada) Carol Zhao
4. (Serbia) Aleksandra Krunić

=== Lucky loser ===
1. (Israel) Lina Glushko

=== Qualifying draw ===
==== First qualifier ====
First round
Alt | (Kazakhstan) Anna Danilina | 6 | 7^{7}
(Norway) Ulrikke Eikeri | 3 | 6^{3}
(Romania) Gabriela Lee | 3 | 2
6 | (Israel) Lina Glushko | 6 | 6

Qualifying competition
Alt | (Kazakhstan) Anna Danilina | 6 | 6
6 | (Israel) Lina Glushko | 3 | 4

==== Second qualifier ====
First round
Alt | (Japan) Makoto Ninomiya | 7 | 4 | 6^{1}
(Ukraine) Kateryna Volodko | 5 | 6 | 7^{7}
WC | (Mexico) Julia García Ruiz | 6 | 4
7 | (Serbia) Natalija Stevanović | 4 | 0^{r}

Qualifying competition
(Ukraine) Kateryna Volodko | 6 | 6
WC | (Mexico) Julia García Ruiz | 2 | 1

==== Third qualifier ====
First round
3 | (France) Amandine Hesse | 3 | 7 | 6
(United States) Catherine Harrison | 6 | 5 | 1
WC | (Mexico) Ana Karen Guadiana Campos | 2 | 2
5 | (Canada) Carol Zhao | 6 | 6

Qualifying competition
3 | (France) Amandine Hesse | 6 | 4 | 3
5 | (Canada) Carol Zhao | 3 | 6 | 6

==== Fourth qualifier ====
First round
4 | (Hungary) Tímea Babos | 6^{7} | 6 | 4
(Serbia) Aleksandra Krunić | 7^{9} | 3 | 6
(Switzerland) Conny Perrin | 3 | 0
8 | (Ukraine) Kateryna Baindl | 6 | 6

Qualifying competition
(Serbia) Aleksandra Krunić | 6 | 6
8 | (Ukraine) Kateryna Baindl | 3 | 3
