= 2024 Monterrey Open =

- Date: 19 – 24 August
- Edition: 16th
- Category: WTA 500
- Draw: 28S / 16D
- Surface: Hard
- Location: Monterrey, Mexico
- Venue: Club Sonoma

Champions

Singles
- (Czech Republic) Linda Nosková

Doubles
- (China) Guo Hanyu / (Romania) Monica Niculescu
| ← 2023 · | Monterrey Open | · 2025 → |

The 2024 Monterrey Open (also known as the Abierto GNP Seguros for sponsorship reasons) was a women's tennis tournament played on outdoor hard courts. It was the 16th edition of the Monterrey Open and a WTA 500 tournament on the 2024 WTA Tour (upgraded from WTA 250 status in previous years). It took place at the Club Sonoma in Monterrey, Mexico, from 19 to 24 August 2024.

== Champions ==
=== Singles ===
- (Czech Republic) Linda Nosková def. (New Zealand) Lulu Sun 7–6^{(8–6)}, 6–4

=== Doubles ===
- (China) Guo Hanyu / (Romania) Monica Niculescu def. (Mexico) Giuliana Olmos / Alexandra Panova 3–6, 6–3, [10–4]

== Singles main draw entrants ==
=== Seeds ===
| Country | Player | Ranking^{1} | Seed |
|---|---|---|---|
| USA | Danielle Collins | 10 | 1 |
| USA | Emma Navarro | 13 | 2 |
| | Ekaterina Alexandrova | 26 | 3 |
| | ~~Anastasia Pavlyuchenkova~~ | ~~28~~ | ~~4~~ |
| UKR | Elina Svitolina | 29 | 5 |
| CZE | Linda Nosková | 31 | 6 |
| CHN | Yuan Yue | 39 | 7 |
| | Veronika Kudermetova | 42 | 8 |
| POL | Magdalena Fręch | 48 | 9 |

- ^{1} Rankings as of 12 August 2024.

=== Other entrants ===
The following players received wildcards into the main draw:

- (Italy) Elisabetta Cocciaretto
- (Mexico) Victoria Rodríguez

The following players received entry from the qualifying draw:

- (Kazakhstan) Anna Danilina
- (Serbia) Aleksandra Krunić
- (Ukraine) Kateryna Volodko
- (Canada) Carol Zhao

The following player received entry as a lucky loser:

- (Israel) Lina Glushko

=== Withdrawals ===
- (United States) Caroline Dolehide → replaced by (Colombia) Camila Osorio
- (Italy) Jasmine Paolini → replaced by (Argentina) Nadia Podoroska
- Anastasia Pavlyuchenkova → replaced by (Israel) Lina Glushko
- (Kazakhstan) Yulia Putintseva → replaced by (Australia) Ajla Tomljanović
- (Bulgaria) Viktoriya Tomova → replaced by (France) Chloé Paquet
- (Croatia) Donna Vekić → replaced by (Germany) Tatjana Maria
- (China) Zhu Lin → replaced by (Armenia) Elina Avanesyan

== Doubles main draw entrants ==
=== Seeds ===
| Country | Player | Country | Player | Rank^{1} | Seed |
|---|---|---|---|---|---|
| MEX | Giuliana Olmos | | Alexandra Panova | 64 | 1 |
| NOR | Ulrikke Eikeri | INA | Aldila Sutjiadi | 66 | 2 |
| CHN | Jiang Xinyu | JPN | Makoto Ninomiya | 86 | 3 |
| KAZ | Anna Danilina | | Irina Khromacheva | 88 | 4 |

- Rankings as of 12 August 2024.

=== Other entrants ===
The following pair received a wildcard into the doubles main draw:

- (Mexico) Julia García Ruiz / (Mexico) Ana Karen Guadiana Campos
