= 2025 Monterrey Open – Doubles =

Doubles
- 2025 Monterrey Open

Final
- Champions: (Spain) Cristina Bucșa (United States) Nicole Melichar-Martinez
- Runners-up: (China) Guo Hanyu; Alexandra Panova
- Score: 6–2, 6–0

Details
- Draw: 16
- Seeds: 4

Events
Singles	Doubles
← 2024 ·	Monterrey Open	· 2026 →

Cristina Bucșa and Nicole Melichar-Martinez defeated defending champion Guo Hanyu and her partner Alexandra Panova in the final, 6–2, 6–0 to win the doubles tennis title at the 2025 Monterrey Open.

Guo and Monica Niculescu were the defending champions, but chose not to compete together this year. Niculescu partnered Oksana Kalashnikova, but lost in the first round to Anna Bondár and Katarzyna Piter.

== Seeds ==
1. (Canada) Gabriela Dabrowski / (New Zealand) Erin Routliffe (quarterfinals)
2. (Ukraine) Lyudmyla Kichenok / (Australia) Ellen Perez (quarterfinals)
3. (China) Guo Hanyu / Alexandra Panova (final)
4. (Spain) Cristina Bucșa / (United States) Nicole Melichar-Martinez (champions)

== Draw ==
=== Key ===
- Q = Qualifier
- WC = Wild card
- LL = Lucky loser
- Alt = Alternate
- ITF = ITF entry
- PR = Protected ranking
- SR = Special ranking
- SE = Special exempt
- JE = Junior exempt
- JR = Junior Accelerator Programme entrant
- CO = College Accelerator Programme entrant
- NG = Next Gen Accelerator Program entrant
- w/o = Walkover
- r = Retired
- d = Defaulted

=== Draw ===
First round
1	(Canada) G Dabrowski (New Zealand) E Routliffe	6	6
I Khromacheva; K Rakhimova	2	1
(Czech Republic) L Nosková (Slovakia) R Šramková	6	2	[10]
(Slovakia) T Mihalíková (Mexico) G Olmos	4	6	[6]
3	(China) H Guo; A Panova	6	6
(Ukraine) N Kichenok (Indonesia) A Sutjiadi	3	2
(Japan) M Kato (Mexico) R Zarazúa	3	0
(Belgium) M Kempen (Czech Republic) A Sisková	6	6
(Hungary) A Bondár (Poland) K Piter	7^{8}	7
(Georgia (country)) O Kalashnikova (Romania) M Niculescu	6^{6}	5
(Spain) J Bouzas Maneiro (Italy) E Cocciaretto	3	1
4	(Spain) C Bucșa (United States) N Melichar-Martinez	6	6
(France) L Jeanjean; M Kozyreva	4	6	[10]
WC	(Mexico) J García Ruiz (Mexico) V Rodríguez	6	4	[4]
(United States) Q Gleason (Brazil) I Martins	2	3
2	(Ukraine) L Kichenok (Australia) E Perez	6	6

Quarterfinals
1	(Canada) G Dabrowski (New Zealand) E Routliffe	6	3	[7]
(Czech Republic) L Nosková (Slovakia) R Šramková	2	6	[10]
3	(China) H Guo; A Panova	7^{8}	6
(Belgium) M Kempen (Czech Republic) A Sisková	6^{6}	3
(Hungary) A Bondár (Poland) K Piter	4	4
4	(Spain) C Bucșa (United States) N Melichar-Martinez	6	6
(France) L Jeanjean; M Kozyreva	7^{7}	6
2	(Ukraine) L Kichenok (Australia) E Perez	6^{4}	4

Semifinals
(Czech Republic) L Nosková (Slovakia) R Šramková	1^{r}
3	(China) H Guo; A Panova	4
4	(Spain) C Bucșa (United States) N Melichar-Martinez	6	6
(France) L Jeanjean; M Kozyreva	4	1

Final
3	(China) H Guo; A Panova	2	0
4	(Spain) C Bucșa (United States) N Melichar-Martinez	6	6
