= 2024 Monterrey Open – Doubles =

Doubles
- 2024 Monterrey Open

Final
- Champions: (China) Guo Hanyu (Romania) Monica Niculescu
- Runners-up: (Mexico) Giuliana Olmos; Alexandra Panova
- Score: 3–6, 6–3, [10–4]

Details
- Draw: 16
- Seeds: 4

Events
Singles	Doubles
← 2023 ·	Monterrey Open	· 2025 →

Guo Hanyu and Monica Niculescu won the doubles title at the 2024 Monterrey Open, defeating Giuliana Olmos and Alexandra Panova in the final, 3–6, 6–3, [10–4].

Yuliana Lizarazo and María Paulina Pérez were the reigning champions, but Lizarazo did not participate this year. Pérez partnered Natalija Stevanović but lost in the first round to Ulrikke Eikeri and Aldila Sutjiadi.

== Seeds ==
1. (Mexico) Giuliana Olmos / Alexandra Panova (final)
2. (Norway) Ulrikke Eikeri / (Indonesia) Aldila Sutjiadi (quarterfinals)
3. (China) Jiang Xinyu / (Japan) Makoto Ninomiya (first round)
4. (Kazakhstan) Anna Danilina / Irina Khromacheva (semifinals)

== Draw ==
=== Key ===
- Q = Qualifier
- WC = Wild card
- LL = Lucky loser
- Alt = Alternate
- ITF = ITF entry
- PR = Protected ranking
- SR = Special ranking
- SE = Special exempt
- JE = Junior exempt
- JR = Junior Accelerator Programme entrant
- CO = College Accelerator Programme entrant
- NG = Next Gen Accelerator Program entrant
- w/o = Walkover
- r = Retired
- d = Defaulted

=== Draw ===
First round
1	(Mexico) G Olmos; A Panova	6	6
WC	(Mexico) J García Ruiz (Mexico) AK Guadiana Campos	3	4
(Hungary) T Babos (Ukraine) N Kichenok	6	6
(France) C Paquet (Mexico) R Zarazúa	2	1
4	(Kazakhstan) A Danilina; I Khromacheva	6	6
(France) A Hesse (Mexico) V Rodríguez	2	2
E Andreeva (Argentina) ML Carlé
(Georgia (country)) O Kalashnikova (Poland) K Piter	w/o
(Slovakia) T Mihalíková (United Kingdom) O Nicholls	6	7
(United States) C Harrison (Poland) A Rosolska	2	5
(Ukraine) L Kichenok (Serbia) A Krunić	7	6
3	(China) X Jiang (Japan) M Ninomiya	5	1
(China) H Guo (Romania) M Niculescu	6	7
(Switzerland) C Perrin (Ukraine) V Strakhova	3	5
(Colombia) MP Pérez (Serbia) N Stevanović	6^{0}	3
2	(Norway) U Eikeri (Indonesia) A Sutjiadi	7^{7}	6

Quarterfinals
1	(Mexico) G Olmos; A Panova	6	6
(Hungary) T Babos (Ukraine) N Kichenok	3	2
4	(Kazakhstan) A Danilina; I Khromacheva	6	6
(Georgia (country)) O Kalashnikova (Poland) K Piter	4	2
(Slovakia) T Mihalíková (United Kingdom) O Nicholls	6	3	[10]
(Ukraine) L Kichenok (Serbia) A Krunić	2	6	[5]
(China) H Guo (Romania) M Niculescu	6	5	[10]
2	(Norway) U Eikeri (Indonesia) A Sutjiadi	4	7	[3]

Semifinals
1	(Mexico) G Olmos; A Panova	7^{7}	6
4	(Kazakhstan) A Danilina; I Khromacheva	6^{3}	4
(Slovakia) T Mihalíková (United Kingdom) O Nicholls	6	6^{3}	[4]
(China) H Guo (Romania) M Niculescu	4	7^{7}	[10]

Final
1	(Mexico) G Olmos; A Panova	6	3	[4]
(China) H Guo (Romania) M Niculescu	3	6	[10]
