= 2024 BNP Paribas Open – Women's doubles =

Women's doubles
- 2024 BNP Paribas Open

Final
- Champions: (Chinese Taipei) Hsieh Su-wei (Belgium) Elise Mertens
- Runners-up: (Australia) Storm Hunter (Czech Republic) Kateřina Siniaková
- Score: 6–3, 6–4

Details
- Draw: 32 (3 WC)
- Seeds: 8

Events
Singles	men	women
Doubles	men	women	mixed
← 2023 ·	BNP Paribas Open	· 2025 →

Hsieh Su-wei and Elise Mertens defeated the defending champion Kateřina Siniaková and her partner Storm Hunter in the final, 6–3, 6–4 to win the women's doubles tennis title at the 2024 Indian Wells Masters. It was Hsieh's 13th and Mertens' seventh WTA 1000 doubles title. Hsieh reclaimed the WTA No. 1 doubles ranking from Mertens. Hunter was also in contention for the top ranking.

Barbora Krejčíková and Siniaková were the reigning champions, but Krejčíková did not participate this year.

== Seeds ==
1. (Chinese Taipei) Hsieh Su-wei / (Belgium) Elise Mertens (champions)
2. (Canada) Gabriela Dabrowski / (New Zealand) Erin Routliffe (second round)
3. (Australia) Storm Hunter / (Czech Republic) Kateřina Siniaková (final)
4. (United States) Nicole Melichar-Martinez / (Australia) Ellen Perez (semifinals)
5. (United States) Coco Gauff / (United States) Jessica Pegula (quarterfinals)
6. (Netherlands) Demi Schuurs / (Brazil) Luisa Stefani (quarterfinals)
7. (Brazil) Beatriz Haddad Maia / (United States) Taylor Townsend (quarterfinals)
8. (Ukraine) Lyudmyla Kichenok / (Latvia) Jeļena Ostapenko (quarterfinals)

== Draw ==
=== Key ===
- Q = Qualifier
- WC = Wild card
- LL = Lucky loser
- Alt = Alternate
- SE = Special exempt
- PR = Protected ranking
- ITF = ITF entry
- JE = Junior exempt
- w/o = Walkover
- r = Retired
- d = Defaulted
- SR = Special ranking

=== Finals ===
Semifinals
1	(Chinese Taipei) Hsieh Su-wei (Belgium) Elise Mertens	6	7^{7}
4	(United States) Nicole Melichar-Martinez (Australia) Ellen Perez	2	6^{5}
3	(Australia) Storm Hunter (Czech Republic) Kateřina Siniaková	6	6
(United States) Asia Muhammad (Japan) Ena Shibahara	4	4

Final
1	(Chinese Taipei) Hsieh Su-wei (Belgium) Elise Mertens	6	6
3	(Australia) Storm Hunter (Czech Republic) Kateřina Siniaková	3	4

=== Top half ===
First round
1	(Chinese Taipei) S-w Hsieh (Belgium) E Mertens	6	7^{7}
(Italy) J Paolini; L Samsonova	4	6^{4}
PR	(Kazakhstan) A Danilina (China) S Zhang	5	6	[1]
(Japan) M Kato (Indonesia) A Sutjiadi	7	2	[10]
(Norway) U Eikeri (China) H Guo	6	3	[10]
A Kalinskaya; V Kudermetova	3	6	[8]
(Romania) S Cîrstea (Croatia) D Vekić	2	4
6	(Netherlands) D Schuurs (Brazil) L Stefani	6	6
4	(United States) N Melichar-Martinez (Australia) E Perez	6	4	[10]
(Czech Republic) L Nosková (Czech Republic) M Vondroušová	0	6	[5]
(Georgia (country)) O Kalashnikova (United States) A Parks	5	3
(Poland) M Linette (United States) B Pera	7	6
PR	(Japan) S Aoyama (Serbia) A Krunić	7	6
(China) Xin Wang (Chinese Taipei) F-h Wu	5	2
(Italy) S Errani (Germany) L Siegemund	6	2	[8]
8	(Ukraine) L Kichenok (Latvia) J Ostapenko	1	6	[10]

Second round
1	(Chinese Taipei) S-w Hsieh (Belgium) E Mertens	6	7^{7}
(Japan) M Kato (Indonesia) A Sutjiadi	3	6^{1}
(Norway) U Eikeri (China) H Guo	2	4
6	(Netherlands) D Schuurs (Brazil) L Stefani	6	6
4	(United States) N Melichar-Martinez (Australia) E Perez	6	3	[10]
(Poland) M Linette (United States) B Pera	3	6	[6]
PR	(Japan) S Aoyama (Serbia) A Krunić	4	4
8	(Ukraine) L Kichenok (Latvia) J Ostapenko	6	6

Quarterfinals
1	(Chinese Taipei) S-w Hsieh (Belgium) E Mertens	6	6
6	(Netherlands) D Schuurs (Brazil) L Stefani	1	4
4	(United States) N Melichar-Martinez (Australia) E Perez	7	3	[10]
8	(Ukraine) L Kichenok (Latvia) J Ostapenko	5	6	[5]

Semifinals
1	(Chinese Taipei) S-w Hsieh (Belgium) E Mertens	6	7^{7}
4	(United States) N Melichar-Martinez (Australia) E Perez	2	6^{5}

=== Bottom half ===
First round
7	(Brazil) B Haddad Maia (United States) T Townsend	6	6
WC	(United States) H Baptiste (United States) C Ngounoue	3	0
(France) C Garcia (China) Y Xu	5	3
(Japan) E Hozumi (Japan) M Ninomiya	7	6
(Czech Republic) M Bouzková (Spain) S Sorribes Tormo	6	6
Alt	E Alexandrova; I Khromacheva	1	3
WC	(United States) A Krueger (United States) S Stephens	3	1
3	(Australia) S Hunter (Czech Republic) K Siniaková	6	6
5	(United States) C Gauff (United States) J Pegula	7	6
WC	(United States) S Kenin (United States) B Mattek-Sands	5	3
(United States) C Dolehide (United States) D Krawczyk	6	5	[11]
(Belgium) G Minnen (Romania) M Niculescu	3	7	[9]
(Chinese Taipei) H-c Chan (Mexico) G Olmos	6^{6}	0
(United States) A Muhammad (Japan) E Shibahara	7^{8}	6
(Spain) C Bucșa; A Panova	0	3
2	(Canada) G Dabrowski (New Zealand) E Routliffe	6	6

Second round
7	(Brazil) B Haddad Maia (United States) T Townsend	7^{7}	4	[10]
(Japan) E Hozumi (Japan) M Ninomiya	6^{3}	6	[7]
(Czech Republic) M Bouzková (Spain) S Sorribes Tormo	3	0
3	(Australia) S Hunter (Czech Republic) K Siniaková	6	6
5	(United States) C Gauff (United States) J Pegula	7^{12}	6
(United States) C Dolehide (United States) D Krawczyk	6^{10}	2
(United States) A Muhammad (Japan) E Shibahara	7^{7}	2	[12]
2	(Canada) G Dabrowski (New Zealand) E Routliffe	6^{3}	6	[10]

Quarterfinals
7	(Brazil) B Haddad Maia (United States) T Townsend	6^{5}	2
3	(Australia) S Hunter (Czech Republic) K Siniaková	7^{7}	6
5	(United States) C Gauff (United States) J Pegula	2	4
(United States) A Muhammad (Japan) E Shibahara	6	6

Semifinals
3	(Australia) S Hunter (Czech Republic) K Siniaková	6	6
(United States) A Muhammad (Japan) E Shibahara	4	4

== Seeded teams ==
The following are the seeded teams. Seedings are based on WTA rankings as of February 26, 2024.

Country	Player	Country	Player	Rank^{1}	Seed
TPE	Hsieh Su-wei	BEL	Elise Mertens	3	1
CAN	Gabriela Dabrowski	NZL	Erin Routliffe	11	2
AUS	Storm Hunter	CZE	Kateřina Siniaková	18	3
USA	Nicole Melichar-Martinez	AUS	Ellen Perez	18	4
USA	Coco Gauff	USA	Jessica Pegula	25	5
NED	Demi Schuurs	BRA	Luisa Stefani	25	6
BRA	Beatriz Haddad Maia	USA	Taylor Townsend	26	7
UKR	Lyudmyla Kichenok	LAT	Jeļena Ostapenko	43	8

== Other entry information ==
=== Wildcards ===
- (United States) Hailey Baptiste / (United States) Clervie Ngounoue
- (United States) Sofia Kenin / (United States) Bethanie Mattek-Sands
- (United States) Ashlyn Krueger / (United States) Sloane Stephens

=== Alternates ===
- Ekaterina Alexandrova / Irina Khromacheva

=== Withdrawals ===
- Mirra Andreeva / Anastasia Potapova → replaced by Ekaterina Alexandrova / Irina Khromacheva
