= 2024 BNP Paribas Open – Women's singles =

Tennis tournament event

Women's singles
- 2024 BNP Paribas Open

Final
- Champion: (Poland) Iga Świątek
- Runner-up: (Greece) Maria Sakkari
- Score: 6–4, 6–0

Details
- Draw: 96 (12 Q / 8 WC )
- Seeds: 32

Events
| Singles | men | women |
| Doubles | men | women | mixed |
- Indian Wells Open

Iga Świątek defeated Maria Sakkari in the final, 6–4, 6–0 to win the women's singles tennis title at the 2024 Indian Wells Open. She did not drop a set en route to her eighth WTA 1000 title and 19th career WTA Tour title. Świątek was the first player since Maria Sharapova in 2013 to win the title without dropping a set, and lost just 21 games during the tournament — the fewest since Steffi Graf lost 16 games in 1994. The final was a rematch of the 2022 final, which Świątek also won.

Elena Rybakina was the reigning champion, but withdrew due to gastrointestinal illness.

== Seeds ==
All seeds received a bye into the second round.

1. (Poland) Iga Świątek (champion)
2. Aryna Sabalenka (fourth round)
3. (United States) Coco Gauff (semifinals)
4. (Kazakhstan) Elena Rybakina (withdrew)
5. (United States) Jessica Pegula (second round)
6. (Tunisia) Ons Jabeur (second round)
7. (Czech Republic) Markéta Vondroušová (third round, withdrew)
8. (China) Zheng Qinwen (second round)
9. (Greece) Maria Sakkari (final)
10. (Latvia) Jeļena Ostapenko (second round)
11. Daria Kasatkina (fourth round)
12. (Brazil) Beatriz Haddad Maia (third round)
13. (Italy) Jasmine Paolini (fourth round)
14. Liudmila Samsonova (second round)
15. Ekaterina Alexandrova (second round)
16. (Ukraine) Elina Svitolina (third round)
17. Veronika Kudermetova (third round)
18. (United States) Madison Keys (third round)
19. (Romania) Sorana Cîrstea (second round)
20. (France) Caroline Garcia (third round)
21. Anna Kalinskaya (third round)
22. Anastasia Pavlyuchenkova (fourth round)
23. (United States) Emma Navarro (quarterfinals)
24. (Belgium) Elise Mertens (fourth round)
25. (Croatia) Donna Vekić (second round)
26. (Czech Republic) Linda Nosková (third round)
27. Victoria Azarenka (second round)
28. Anastasia Potapova (quarterfinals)
29. (Canada) Leylah Fernandez (second round)
30. (Ukraine) Dayana Yastremska (second round, retired)
31. (Ukraine) Marta Kostyuk (semifinals)
32. (Ukraine) Anhelina Kalinina (second round)

Click on the seed number of a player to go to their draw section.

== Draw ==
Key

- Q = Qualifier
- WC = Wild card
- LL = Lucky loser
- Alt = Alternate
- ITF = ITF entry
- PR = Protected ranking
- SR = Special ranking
- SE = Special exempt
- JE = Junior exempt
- JR = Junior Accelerator Programme entrant
- CO = College Accelerator Programme entrant
- NG = Next Gen Accelerator Program entrant
- w/o = Walkover
- r = Retired
- d = Defaulted

=== Finals ===
Quarterfinals
1 | (Poland) Iga Świątek | 6 | 1
WC | (Denmark) Caroline Wozniacki | 4 | 0^{r}
28 | Anastasia Potapova | 0 | 5
31 | (Ukraine) Marta Kostyuk | 6 | 7
(China) Yuan Yue | 4 | 3
3 | (United States) Coco Gauff | 6 | 6
9 | (Greece) Maria Sakkari | 5 | 6 | 6
23 | (United States) Emma Navarro | 7 | 2 | 4

Semifinals
1 | (Poland) Iga Świątek | 6 | 6
31 | (Ukraine) Marta Kostyuk | 2 | 1
3 | (United States) Coco Gauff | 4 | 7^{7} | 2
9 | (Greece) Maria Sakkari | 6 | 6^{5} | 6

Final
1 | (Poland) Iga Świątek | 6 | 6
9 | (Greece) Maria Sakkari | 4 | 0

=== Top half ===
==== Section 1 ====
First round
Q | E Andreeva | 6^{3} | 6^{6}
(United States) D Collins | 7^{7} | 7^{8}
(Italy) C Giorgi | 6 | 6
(United Kingdom) K Boulter | 3 | 2
Q | (United States) R Montgomery | 2 | 6 | 1
Q | (United States) H Baptiste | 6 | 4 | 6
(Germany) T Korpatsch | 2 | 3
(Kazakhstan) Y Putintseva | 6 | 6

Second round
1 | (Poland) I Świątek | 6 | 6
(United States) D Collins | 3 | 0
(Italy) C Giorgi | 3 | 5
26 | (Czech Republic) L Nosková | 6 | 7
18 | (United States) M Keys | 6 | 4 | 7^{7}
Q | (United States) H Baptiste | 4 | 6 | 6^{4}
(Kazakhstan) Y Putintseva | 7 | 6
15 | E Alexandrova | 5 | 1

Third round
1 | (Poland) I Świątek | 6 | 6
26 | (Czech Republic) L Nosková | 4 | 0
18 | (United States) M Keys | 4 | 1
(Kazakhstan) Y Putintseva | 6 | 6

Fourth round
1 | (Poland) I Świątek | 6 | 6
(Kazakhstan) Y Putintseva | 1 | 2

==== Section 2 ====
First round
PR | (Germany) A Kerber | 6 | 6
(Croatia) P Martić | 3 | 4
Q | (Japan) N Hibino | 2 | 6 | 6
WC | (United States) V Williams | 6 | 3 | 0
WC | (Denmark) C Wozniacki | 7^{8} | 6
(China) L Zhu | 6^{6} | 1
M Andreeva | 5 | 5
WC | (United States) K Volynets | 7 | 7

Second round
10 | (Latvia) J Ostapenko | 7 | 3 | 3
PR | (Germany) A Kerber | 5 | 6 | 6
Q | (Japan) N Hibino | 1 | 5
17 | V Kudermetova | 6 | 7
25 | (Croatia) D Vekić | 6^{5} | 3
WC | (Denmark) C Wozniacki | 7^{7} | 6
WC | (United States) K Volynets | 6 | 6
6 | (Tunisia) O Jabeur | 4 | 4

Third round
PR | (Germany) A Kerber | 6 | 7
17 | V Kudermetova | 4 | 5
WC | (Denmark) C Wozniacki | 6 | 4 | 6
WC | (United States) K Volynets | 2 | 6 | 0

Fourth round
PR | (Germany) A Kerber | 4 | 2
WC | (Denmark) C Wozniacki | 6 | 6

==== Section 3 ====
First round
LL | (Argentina) N Podoroska | 3 | 6 | 6
WC | (United States) A Krueger | 6 | 3 | 3
(Spain) S Sorribes Tormo | 1 | 1
(Czech Republic) M Bouzková | 6 | 6
Q | (United States) T Townsend | 3 | 7^{7} | 6
(Poland) M Linette | 6 | 6^{3} | 1
(Germany) T Maria | 7^{7} | 6
(Netherlands) A Rus | 6^{5} | 2

Second round
LL | (United States) K Day | 6^{3} | 4
LL | (Argentina) N Podoroska | 7^{7} | 6
(Czech Republic) M Bouzková | 5 | 1
28 | A Potapova | 7 | 6
21 | A Kalinskaya | 7 | 3 | 6
Q | (United States) T Townsend | 5 | 6 | 4
(Germany) T Maria | 3 | 3
13 | (Italy) J Paolini | 6 | 6

Third round
LL | (Argentina) N Podoroska | 1 | 1
28 | A Potapova | 6 | 6
21 | A Kalinskaya | 3 | 6 | 4
13 | (Italy) J Paolini | 6 | 3 | 6

Fourth round
28 | A Potapova | 7 | 0 | 6
13 | (Italy) J Paolini | 5 | 6 | 3

==== Section 4 ====
First round
Q | (Slovakia) R Šramková | 6 | 6
(China) Y Wang | 4 | 0
WC | (United States) M Kessler | 3 | 6^{3}
Q | (Spain) N Párrizas Díaz | 6 | 7^{7}
Q | (Japan) M Hontama | 5 | 6 | 6
PR | (China) S Zhang | 7 | 2 | 0
Q | (United States) B Pera | 7 | 4 | 7^{7}
PR | (Australia) D Saville | 5 | 6 | 6^{5}

Second round
12 | (Brazil) B Haddad Maia | 7 | 6
Q | (Slovakia) R Šramková | 5 | 2
Q | (Spain) N Párrizas Díaz | 3 | 1
22 | A Pavlyuchenkova | 6 | 6
31 | (Ukraine) M Kostyuk | 6 | 6
Q | (Japan) M Hontama | 4 | 2
Q | (United States) B Pera | 0 | 2
7 | (Czech Republic) M Vondroušová | 6 | 6

Third round
12 | (Brazil) B Haddad Maia | 6 | 4 | 3
22 | A Pavlyuchenkova | 2 | 6 | 6
31 | (Ukraine) M Kostyuk | w/o
7 | (Czech Republic) M Vondroušová

Fourth round
22 | A Pavlyuchenkova | 4 | 1
31 | (Ukraine) M Kostyuk | 6 | 6

=== Bottom half ===
==== Section 5 ====
First round
(France) V Gracheva | 4 | 1
(China) Y Yuan | 6 | 6
(Spain) C Bucșa | 2 | 0
(United States) C Dolehide | 6 | 6
(United States) S Stephens | 7 | 6
(Egypt) M Sherif | 5 | 3
E Avanesyan | 6 | 3 | 6^{4}
(France) O Dodin | 1 | 6 | 7^{7}

Second round
8 | (China) Q Zheng | 4 | 3
(China) Y Yuan | 6 | 6
(United States) C Dolehide | 7 | 2 | 6
27 | V Azarenka | 5 | 6 | 3
19 | (Romania) S Cîrstea | 0 | 5
(United States) S Stephens | 6 | 7
(France) O Dodin | 3 | 6^{5}
11 | D Kasatkina | 6 | 7^{7}

Third round
(China) Y Yuan | 1 | 6 | 7^{7}
(United States) C Dolehide | 6 | 4 | 6^{2}
(United States) S Stephens | 6 | 4 | 4
11 | D Kasatkina | 2 | 6 | 6

Fourth round
(China) Y Yuan | 4 | 6 | 6
11 | D Kasatkina | 6 | 4 | 3

==== Section 6 ====
First round
PR | (Japan) N Osaka | 6 | 6
Q | (Italy) S Errani | 3 | 1
(China) Xin Wang | 6 | 6
(Slovakia) AK Schmiedlová | 0 | 4
(Poland) M Fręch | 2 | 4
(Italy) L Bronzetti | 6 | 6
(China) Xiy Wang | 6 | 2 | 4
(France) C Burel | 4 | 6 | 6

Second round
14 | L Samsonova | 5 | 3
PR | (Japan) N Osaka | 7 | 6
(China) Xin Wang | 1 | 4
24 | (Belgium) E Mertens | 6 | 6
32 | (Ukraine) A Kalinina | 3 | 4
(Italy) L Bronzetti | 6 | 6
(France) C Burel | 6 | 3 | 6^{4}
3 | (United States) C Gauff | 2 | 6 | 7^{7}

Third round
PR | (Japan) N Osaka | 5 | 4
24 | (Belgium) E Mertens | 7 | 6
(Italy) L Bronzetti | 2 | 6^{5}
3 | (United States) C Gauff | 6 | 7^{7}

Fourth round
24 | (Belgium) E Mertens | 0 | 2
3 | (United States) C Gauff | 6 | 6

==== Section 7 ====
First round
A Blinkova | 6 | 2 | 6
WC | (Czech Republic) Ka Plíšková | 1 | 6 | 4
(France) D Parry | 7 | 6
(Italy) M Trevisan | 5 | 3
(Bulgaria) V Tomova | 6 | 7^{7}
(United States) S Kenin | 4 | 6^{5}
D Shnaider | 5 | 7^{8} | 6
(Romania) A Bogdan | 7 | 6^{6} | 3

Second round
5 | (United States) J Pegula | 2 | 6 | 3
A Blinkova | 6 | 3 | 6
(France) D Parry | 7 | 5 | 6
29 | (Canada) L Fernandez | 5 | 7 | 2
20 | (France) C Garcia | 6 | 3 | 6
(Bulgaria) V Tomova | 1 | 6 | 3
D Shnaider | 7 | 4 | 0
9 | (Greece) M Sakkari | 5 | 6 | 6

Third round
A Blinkova | 4 | 3
(France) D Parry | 6 | 6
20 | (France) C Garcia | 3 | 4
9 | (Greece) M Sakkari | 6 | 6

Fourth round
(France) D Parry | 2 | 6 | 3
9 | (Greece) M Sakkari | 6 | 3 | 6

==== Section 8 ====
First round
(Czech Republic) K Siniaková | 7 | 7^{7}
(Belgium) G Minnen | 5 | 6^{3}
Q | (United States) L Hovde | 3 | 1
(Ukraine) L Tsurenko | 6 | 6
WC | (United Kingdom) E Raducanu | 6 | 6
Q | (Spain) R Masarova | 2 | 3
(Italy) E Cocciaretto | 3 | 2
(United States) P Stearns | 6 | 6

Second round
16 | (Ukraine) E Svitolina | 6 | 2 | 6
(Czech Republic) K Siniaková | 3 | 6 | 1
(Ukraine) L Tsurenko | 6 | 5 | 5
23 | (United States) E Navarro | 4 | 7 | 7
30 | (Ukraine) D Yastremska | 0^{r}
WC | (United Kingdom) E Raducanu | 4
(United States) P Stearns | 7^{7} | 2 | 6^{6}
2 | A Sabalenka | 6^{2} | 6 | 7^{8}

Third round
16 | (Ukraine) E Svitolina | 1 | 6 | 3
23 | (United States) E Navarro | 6 | 4 | 6
WC | (United Kingdom) E Raducanu | 3 | 5
2 | A Sabalenka | 6 | 7

Fourth round
23 | (United States) E Navarro | 6 | 3 | 6
2 | A Sabalenka | 3 | 6 | 2

== Seeded players ==
| ^{‡} | Champion |
| ^{†} | Runner-up |

The following are the seeded players. Seedings are based on WTA rankings as of February 26, 2024. Rankings and points before are as of March 4, 2024.

| Seed | Rank | Player | Points before | Points defending | Points earned | Points after | Status |
|---|---|---|---|---|---|---|---|
| 1 | 1 | (Poland) Iga Świątek ‡ | 10,105 | 390 | 1,000 | 10,715 | Champion, defeated (Greece) Maria Sakkari [9] |
| 2 | 2 | Aryna Sabalenka | 8,725 | 650 | 120 | 8,195 | Fourth round lost to (United States) Emma Navarro [23] |
| 3 | 3 | (United States) Coco Gauff | 6,975 | 215 | 390 | 7,150 | Semifinals lost to (Greece) Maria Sakkari [9] |
| 4 | 4 | (Kazakhstan) Elena Rybakina | 6,848 | 1,000 | 0 | 5,848 | Withdrew due to gastrointestinal illness |
| 5 | 5 | (United States) Jessica Pegula | 5,145 | 120 | 10 | 5,035 | Second round lost to Anna Blinkova |
| 6 | 6 | (Tunisia) Ons Jabeur | 4,173 | 65 | 10 | 4,118 | Second round lost to (United States) Katie Volynets [WC] |
| 7 | 7 | (Czech Republic) Markéta Vondroušová | 4,070 | 120 | 65 | 4,015 | Third round withdrew for personal reasons |
| 8 | 8 | (China) Zheng Qinwen | 4,040 | 0 | 10 | 4,050 | Second round lost to (China) Yuan Yue |
| 9 | 9 | (Greece) Maria Sakkari † | 3,565 | 390 | 650 | 3,825 | Runner-up, lost to (Poland) Iga Świątek [1] |
| 10 | 10 | (Latvia) Jeļena Ostapenko | 3,548 | 65 | 10 | 3,493 | Second round lost to (Germany) Angelique Kerber [PR] |
| 11 | 12 | Daria Kasatkina | 3,063 | 65 | 120 | 3,118 | Fourth round lost to (China) Yuan Yue |
| 12 | 13 | (Brazil) Beatriz Haddad Maia | 2,870 | 65 | 65 | 2,870 | Third round lost to Anastasia Pavlyuchenkova [22] |
| 13 | 14 | (Italy) Jasmine Paolini | 2,700 | 10 | 120 | 2,810 | Fourth round lost to Anastasia Potapova [28] |
| 14 | 15 | Liudmila Samsonova | 2,605 | 10 | 10 | 2,605 | Second round lost to (Japan) Naomi Osaka [PR] |
| 15 | 16 | Ekaterina Alexandrova | 2,475 | 10 | 10 | 2,475 | Second round lost to (Kazakhstan) Yulia Putintseva |
| 16 | 17 | (Ukraine) Elina Svitolina | 2,332 | 0 | 65 | 2,397 | Third round lost to (United States) Emma Navarro [23] |
| 17 | 19 | Veronika Kudermetova | 2,305 | 65 | 65 | 2,305 | Third round lost to (Germany) Angelique Kerber [PR] |
| 18 | 20 | (United States) Madison Keys | 2,287 | 10 | 65 | 2,342 | Third round lost to (Kazakhstan) Yulia Putintseva |
| 19 | 22 | (Romania) Sorana Cîrstea | 2,223 | 215 | 10 | 2,018 | Second round lost to (United States) Sloane Stephens |
| 20 | 26 | (France) Caroline Garcia | 1,920 | 120 | 65 | 1,865 | Third round lost to (Greece) Maria Sakkari [9] |
| 21 | 25 | Anna Kalinskaya | 1,943 | 35 | 65 | 1,973 | Third round lost to (Italy) Jasmine Paolini [13] |
| 22 | 24 | Anastasia Pavlyuchenkova | 1,981 | (10)^{†} | 120 | 2,091 | Fourth round lost to (Ukraine) Marta Kostyuk [31] |
| 23 | 23 | (United States) Emma Navarro | 1,998 | 35 | 215 | 2,178 | Quarterfinals lost to (Greece) Maria Sakkari [9] |
| 24 | 28 | (Belgium) Elise Mertens | 1,646 | 10 | 120 | 1,756 | Fourth round lost to (United States) Coco Gauff [3] |
| 25 | 36 | (Croatia) Donna Vekić | 1,518 | 10 | 10 | 1,518 | Second round lost to (Denmark) Caroline Wozniacki [WC] |
| 26 | 29 | (Czech Republic) Linda Nosková | 1,613 | 65 | 65 | 1,613 | Third round lost to (Poland) Iga Świątek [1] |
| 27 | 30 | Victoria Azarenka | 1,591 | 10 | 10 | 1,591 | Second round lost to (United States) Caroline Dolehide |
| 28 | 33 | Anastasia Potapova | 1,557 | 65 | 215 | 1,707 | Quarterfinals lost to (Ukraine) Marta Kostyuk [31] |
| 29 | 34 | (Canada) Leylah Fernandez | 1,545 | 65 | 10 | 1,490 | Second round lost to (France) Diane Parry |
| 30 | 31 | (Ukraine) Dayana Yastremska | 1,577 | 35 | 10 | 1,552 | Second round retired against (United Kingdom) Emma Raducanu [WC] |
| 31 | 32 | (Ukraine) Marta Kostyuk | 1,566 | 10 | 390 | 1,946 | Semifinals lost to (Poland) Iga Świątek [1] |
| 32 | 35 | (Ukraine) Anhelina Kalinina | 1,538 | 65 | 10 | 1,483 | Second round lost to (Italy) Lucia Bronzetti |

† The player did not qualify for the main draw in 2023. Points for her 18th best result will be deducted instead.

=== Withdrawn players ===
The following players would have been seeded, but withdrew before the tournament began.

| Rank | Player | Points before | Points dropped | Points after | Withdrawal reason |
|---|---|---|---|---|---|
| 11 | (Czech Republic) Karolína Muchová | 3,275 | 215 | 3,060 | Wrist surgery |
| 18 | (Czech Republic) Petra Kvitová | 2,305 | 215 | 2,090 | Pregnancy |
| 21 | (Czech Republic) Barbora Krejčíková | 2,233 | 120 | 2,113 | Severe flu |

== Other entry information ==
=== Wild cards ===
- ~~(Spain) Paula Badosa~~
- (United States) McCartney Kessler
- (United States) Ashlyn Krueger
- (Czech Republic) Karolína Plíšková
- (United Kingdom) Emma Raducanu
- (United States) Katie Volynets
- (United States) Venus Williams
- (Denmark) Caroline Wozniacki

=== Protected ranking ===
- (Germany) Angelique Kerber
- (Japan) Naomi Osaka
- (Australia) Daria Saville
- (China) Zhang Shuai

=== Withdrawals ===
- ‡ (United States) Amanda Anisimova → replaced by Diana Shnaider
- † (Switzerland) Belinda Bencic → replaced by (Spain) Cristina Bucșa
- @ (Spain) Paula Badosa (SR)→ replaced by (Belgium) Greet Minnen
- § (Spain) Paula Badosa (WC)→ replaced by (Argentina) Nadia Podoroska
- ‡ (Czech Republic) Barbora Krejčíková → replaced by (Slovakia) Anna Karolína Schmiedlová
- † (Czech Republic) Petra Kvitová → replaced by (United States) Danielle Collins
- ‡ (Czech Republic) Karolína Muchová → replaced by (France) Océane Dodin
- § (Kazakhstan) Elena Rybakina → replaced by (United States) Kayla Day
- ‡ (Latvia) Anastasija Sevastova → replaced by (Germany) Tamara Korpatsch

† – not included on entry list
‡ – withdrew from entry list
@ – withdrew from entry list, received wild card, and withdrew again
§ – withdrew from main draw

== Qualifying ==
=== Seeds ===
1. (Romania) Jaqueline Cristian (first round)
2. (United States) Bernarda Pera (qualified)
3. (Japan) Nao Hibino (qualified)
4. (United States) Taylor Townsend (qualified)
5. (Argentina) Nadia Podoroska (qualifying competition, lucky loser)
6. (Belgium) Yanina Wickmayer (first round)
7. (Germany) Laura Siegemund (first round)
8. (United States) Kayla Day (qualifying competition, lucky loser)
9. (Italy) Sara Errani (qualified)
10. (United Kingdom) Harriet Dart (qualifying competition)
11. (Denmark) Clara Tauson (qualifying competition)
12. (United States) Emina Bektas (first round)
13. Kamilla Rakhimova (first round)
14. Erika Andreeva (qualified)
15. (Spain) Rebeka Masarova (qualified)
16. (Colombia) Camila Osorio (qualifying competition)
17. (Australia) Arina Rodionova (qualifying competition)
18. Aliaksandra Sasnovich (first round)
19. (Argentina) María Lourdes Carlé (first round)
20. (Mexico) Renata Zarazúa (first round)
21. Maria Timofeeva (first round)
22. (France) Alizé Cornet (first round)
23. (United States) Hailey Baptiste (qualified)
24. (Spain) Marina Bassols Ribera (first round)

=== Qualifiers ===
1. (United States) Robin Montgomery
2. (United States) Bernarda Pera
3. (Japan) Nao Hibino
4. (United States) Taylor Townsend
5. (Spain) Nuria Párrizas Díaz
6. (Slovakia) Rebecca Šramková
7. (Japan) Mai Hontama
8. Erika Andreeva
9. (Italy) Sara Errani
10. (United States) Liv Hovde
11. (United States) Hailey Baptiste
12. (Spain) Rebeka Masarova

=== Lucky losers ===
1. (Argentina) Nadia Podoroska
2. (United States) Kayla Day

=== Qualifying draw ===
==== First qualifier ====
First round
1 | (Romania) Jaqueline Cristian | 3 | 5
(Australia) Storm Hunter | 6 | 7
WC | (United States) Robin Montgomery | 6 | 6
24 | (Spain) Marina Bassols Ribera | 4 | 4

Qualifying competition
(Australia) Storm Hunter | 6 | 3 | 4
WC | (United States) Robin Montgomery | 3 | 6 | 6

==== Second qualifier ====
First round
2 | (United States) Bernarda Pera | 5 | 6 | 7^{8}
WC | (United States) Christasha McNeil | 7 | 2 | 6^{6}
(Brazil) Laura Pigossi | 6 | 3 | 4
16 | (Colombia) Camila Osorio | 4 | 6 | 6

Qualifying competition
2 | (United States) Bernarda Pera | 6 | 3 | 6
16 | (Colombia) Camila Osorio | 2 | 6 | 1

==== Third qualifier ====
First round
3 | (Japan) Nao Hibino | 6 | 4 | 6
(Argentina) Julia Riera | 3 | 6 | 3
PR | (Chinese Taipei) Hsieh Su-wei | 3 | 6 | 6
13 | Kamilla Rakhimova | 6 | 3 | 4

Qualifying competition
3 | (Japan) Nao Hibino | 2 | 6 | 6
PR | (Chinese Taipei) Hsieh Su-wei | 6 | 1 | 2

==== Fourth qualifier ====
First round
4 | (United States) Taylor Townsend | 6 | 6
WC | (United States) Iva Jovic | 1 | 2
WC | (United States) Clervie Ngounoue | 6 | 6
22 | (France) Alizé Cornet | 2 | 3

Qualifying competition
4 | (United States) Taylor Townsend | 3 | 6 | 6
WC | (United States) Clervie Ngounoue | 6 | 1 | 2

==== Fifth qualifier ====
First round
5 | (Argentina) Nadia Podoroska | 6 | 6
(Australia) Olivia Gadecki | 2 | 4
(Spain) Nuria Párrizas Díaz | 7^{7} | 6
19 | (Argentina) María Lourdes Carlé | 6^{5} | 3

Qualifying competition
5 | (Argentina) Nadia Podoroska | 5 | 7^{7} | 3
(Spain) Nuria Párrizas Díaz | 7 | 6^{4} | 6

==== Sixth qualifier ====
First round
6 | (Belgium) Yanina Wickmayer | 0 | 1
(Slovakia) Rebecca Šramková | 6 | 6
(France) Jessika Ponchet | 5 | 6 | 6
20 | (Mexico) Renata Zarazúa | 7 | 3 | 4

Qualifying competition
(Slovakia) Rebecca Šramková | 2 | 6 | 7^{7}
(France) Jessika Ponchet | 6 | 2 | 6^{5}

==== Seventh qualifier ====
First round
7 | (Germany) Laura Siegemund | 1 | 6 | 4
(Japan) Mai Hontama | 6 | 3 | 6
(United States) Claire Liu | 7^{7} | 6
21 | Maria Timofeeva | 6^{5} | 2

Qualifying competition
(Japan) Mai Hontama | 6 | 5 | 6
(United States) Claire Liu | 1 | 7 | 3

==== Eighth qualifier ====
First round
8 | (United States) Kayla Day | 6 | 6
(United States) Alycia Parks | 1 | 4
(Colombia) Emiliana Arango | 6 | 4 | 1
14 | Erika Andreeva | 3 | 6 | 6

Qualifying competition
8 | (United States) Kayla Day | 1 | 6 | 3
14 | Erika Andreeva | 6 | 3 | 6

==== Ninth qualifier ====
First round
9 | (Italy) Sara Errani | 7 | 6
PR | (Serbia) Aleksandra Krunić | 5 | 1
(Hungary) Dalma Gálfi | 2 | 5
17 | (Australia) Arina Rodionova | 6 | 7

Qualifying competition
9 | (Italy) Sara Errani | 6 | 6
17 | (Australia) Arina Rodionova | 4 | 0

==== Tenth qualifier ====
First round
10 | (United Kingdom) Harriet Dart | 6 | 6
(Latvia) Darja Semeņistaja | 2 | 2
WC | (United States) Liv Hovde | 6 | 6
18 | Aliaksandra Sasnovich | 2 | 4

Qualifying competition
10 | (United Kingdom) Harriet Dart | 2 | 3
WC | (United States) Liv Hovde | 6 | 6

==== Eleventh qualifier ====
First round
11 | (Denmark) Clara Tauson | 6 | 6
WC | (United States) Haley Giavara | 3 | 1
Alt | (Ukraine) Daria Snigur | 2 | 3
23 | (United States) Hailey Baptiste | 6 | 6

Qualifying competition
11 | (Denmark) Clara Tauson | 6^{2} | 6^{3}
23 | (United States) Hailey Baptiste | 7^{7} | 7^{7}

==== Twelfth qualifier ====
First round
12 | (United States) Emina Bektas | 6^{4} | 3
(Czech Republic) Linda Fruhvirtová | 7^{7} | 6
(United Kingdom) Heather Watson | 6 | 4 | 4
15 | (Spain) Rebeka Masarova | 3 | 6 | 6

Qualifying competition
(Czech Republic) Linda Fruhvirtová | 1 | 5
15 | (Spain) Rebeka Masarova | 6 | 7
