= 2025 Monterrey Open =

- Date: 18–23 August
- Edition: 17th
- Category: WTA 500
- Draw: 28S / 16D
- Prize money: $1,064,510
- Surface: Hard
- Location: Monterrey, Mexico
- Venue: Club Sonoma

Champions

Singles
- Diana Shnaider

Doubles
- (Spain) Cristina Bucșa / (United States) Nicole Melichar-Martinez
- Monterrey Open

The 2025 Monterrey Open, also known as the Abierto GNP Seguros for sponsorship reasons, was a women's tennis tournament played on outdoor hard courts. It was the 17th edition of the Monterrey Open and a WTA 500 tournament on the 2025 WTA Tour. It took place at the Club Sonoma in Monterrey, Mexico, from 18 August through 23 August 2025. Third-seeded Diana Shnaider won the singles title.

== Champions ==
=== Singles ===
- Diana Shnaider def. Ekaterina Alexandrova, 6–3, 4–6, 6–4

=== Doubles ===
- (Spain) Cristina Bucșa / (United States) Nicole Melichar-Martinez def. (China) Guo Hanyu / Alexandra Panova 6–2, 6–0

== Singles main draw entrants ==
=== Seeds ===
Country	Player	Ranking^{1}	Seed
USA	Emma Navarro	11	1
	Ekaterina Alexandrova	16	2
	Diana Shnaider	20	3
BRA	Beatriz Haddad Maia	21	4
BEL	Elise Mertens	22	5
CZE	Linda Nosková	23	6
CAN	Leylah Fernandez	25	7
	Anastasia Pavlyuchenkova	33	8

- ^{1} Rankings as of 11 August 2025.

=== Other entrants ===
The following players received wildcards into the main draw:

- (United States) Emma Navarro
- (Mexico) Victoria Rodríguez
- (Greece) Maria Sakkari
- (Australia) Ajla Tomljanović

The following players received entry from the qualifying draw:

- (Spain) Cristina Bucșa
- (France) Léolia Jeanjean
- (Croatia) Antonia Ružić
- (New Zealand) Lulu Sun

=== Withdrawals ===
- (Poland) Magdalena Fręch → replaced by (United States) Alycia Parks
- Anna Kalinskaya → replaced by (Mexico) Renata Zarazúa
- (United States) Sofia Kenin → replaced by (Hungary) Anna Bondár
- Veronika Kudermetova → replaced by Kamilla Rakhimova

== Doubles main draw entrants ==
=== Seeds ===
Country	Player	Country	Player	Rank^{1}	Seed
CAN	Gabriela Dabrowski	NZL	Erin Routliffe	20	1
UKR	Lyudmyla Kichenok	AUS	Ellen Perez	35	2
CHN	Guo Hanyu		Alexandra Panova	54	3
ESP	Cristina Bucșa	USA	Nicole Melichar-Martinez	57	4

- Rankings as of 11 August 2025.

=== Other entrants ===
The following pair received a wildcard into the doubles main draw:

- (Mexico) Julia García Ruiz / (Mexico) Victoria Rodríguez
