= 2024 BNP Paribas Open =

- Date: March 6–17
- Edition: 50th (ATP) / 35th (WTA)
- Category: ATP Tour Masters 1000 (Men); WTA 1000 (Women)
- Draw: 96S / 32D
- Prize money: $9,495,555 (ATP) $9,258,080 (WTA)
- Surface: Hard
- Location: Indian Wells, California, United States
- Venue: Indian Wells Tennis Garden

Champions

Men's singles
- (Spain) Carlos Alcaraz

Women's singles
- (Poland) Iga Świątek

Men's doubles
- (Netherlands) Wesley Koolhof / (Croatia) Nikola Mektić

Women's doubles
- (Chinese Taipei) Hsieh Su-wei / (Belgium) Elise Mertens

Mixed doubles
- (Australia) Storm Hunter / (Australia) Matthew Ebden
← 2023 ·	Indian Wells Open	· 2025 →

The 2024 Indian Wells Open was a professional men's and women's tennis tournament played in Indian Wells, California. It was the 50th edition of the men's event and 35th of the women's event and was classified as an ATP Tour Masters 1000 event on the 2024 ATP Tour and a WTA 1000 event on the 2024 WTA Tour. The men's and women's main draw events took place from March 6 through March 17, 2024 on outdoor hard courts at the Indian Wells Tennis Garden.

== Champions ==
=== Men's Singles ===
- (Spain) Carlos Alcaraz def. Daniil Medvedev 7–6^{(7–5)}, 6–1

=== Women's Singles ===
- (Poland) Iga Świątek def. (Greece) Maria Sakkari: 6–4, 6–0

=== Men's Doubles ===
- (Netherlands) Wesley Koolhof / (Croatia) Nikola Mektić def. (Spain) Marcel Granollers / (Argentina) Horacio Zeballos: 7–6^{(7–2)}, 7–6^{(7–4)}

=== Women's Doubles ===
- (Chinese Taipei) Hsieh Su-wei / (Belgium) Elise Mertens def. (Australia) Storm Hunter / (Czech Republic) Kateřina Siniaková: 6–3, 6–4

=== Mixed Doubles ===
- (Australia) Storm Hunter / (Australia) Matthew Ebden def. (France) Caroline Garcia / (France) Édouard Roger-Vasselin: 6–3, 6–3

== Points and prize money ==
=== Point distribution ===
Event	W	F	SF	QF	R16	R32	R64	R128	Q	Q2	Q1
Men's singles	1000	650	400	200	100	50	30*	10**	20	10	0
Men's doubles	1000	600	360	180	90	0	—	—	—	—	—
Women's singles	1000	650	390	215	120	65	35*	10	30	20	2
Women's doubles	1000	650	390	215	120	10	—	—	—	—	—

* Players with byes receive first-round points.
** Singles players with wild cards earn 0 points.

=== Prize money ===
The total combined prize money for the 2024 BNP Paribas Open was $17,991,110, with each tour (ATP and WTA) playing for a share of $8,995,555. This represented a rise of 2.22% from 2023.

For 2024, more prize money was allocated to the earlier rounds. For example, the champion's prize money was reduced by 12.85% ($1,100,000 in 2024 vs $1,262,220 in 2023), while first-round losers' pay increased by 61.04% ($30,050 in 2024 vs $18,660 in 2023).

Event	W	F	SF	QF	R16	R32	R64	R128	Q2	Q1
Men's singles	$1,100,000	$585,000	$325,000	$185,000	$101,000	$59,100	$42,000	$30,050	$14,400	$7,800
Women's singles	$1,100,000	$585,000	$325,000	$185,000	$101,000	$59,100	$42,000	$30,050	$14,400	$7,800
Men's doubles*	$447,300	$236,800	$127,170	$63,600	$34,100	$18,640	—	—	—	—
Women's doubles*	$447,300	$236,800	$127,170	$63,600	$34,100	$18,640	—	—	—	—

*per team

== See also ==
- 2024 ATP Tour
- 2024 WTA Tour
- ATP Tour Masters 1000
- WTA 1000 tournaments
