= 2024 BNP Paribas Open – Men's doubles =

Men's doubles
- 2024 BNP Paribas Open

Final
- Champions: (Netherlands) Wesley Koolhof (Croatia) Nikola Mektić
- Runners-up: (Spain) Marcel Granollers (Argentina) Horacio Zeballos
- Score: 7–6^{(7–2)}, 7–6^{(7–4)}

Details
- Draw: 32 (3 WC)
- Seeds: 8

Events
Singles	men	women
Doubles	men	women	mixed
← 2023 ·	BNP Paribas Open	· 2025 →

Wesley Koolhof and Nikola Mektić defeated Marcel Granollers and Horacio Zeballos in the final, 7–6^{(7–2)}, 7–6^{(7–4)} to win the men's doubles tennis title at the 2024 Indian Wells Masters. It was the fourth ATP Masters 1000 doubles title for both players.

Rohan Bopanna and Matthew Ebden were the defending champions, but lost in the first round to Sander Gillé and Joran Vliegen.

Austin Krajicek regained the ATP No. 1 doubles ranking at the end of the tournament. Bopanna and Joe Salisbury were also in contention for the top ranking.

== Seeds ==
1. (India) Rohan Bopanna / (Australia) Matthew Ebden (first round)
2. (Croatia) Ivan Dodig / (United States) Austin Krajicek (quarterfinals)
3. (United States) Rajeev Ram / (United Kingdom) Joe Salisbury (second round)
4. (Mexico) Santiago González / (United Kingdom) Neal Skupski (first round)
5. (Spain) Marcel Granollers / (Argentina) Horacio Zeballos (final)
6. (Argentina) Máximo González / (Argentina) Andrés Molteni (first round)
7. (Germany) Kevin Krawietz / (Germany) Tim Pütz (semifinals)
8. (United Kingdom) Jamie Murray / (New Zealand) Michael Venus (second round, withdrew)

== Draw ==
=== Key ===
- Q = Qualifier
- WC = Wild card
- LL = Lucky loser
- Alt = Alternate
- ITF = ITF entry
- PR = Protected ranking
- SR = Special ranking
- SE = Special exempt
- JE = Junior exempt
- JR = Junior Accelerator Programme entrant
- CO = College Accelerator Programme entrant
- NG = Next Gen Accelerator Program entrant
- w/o = Walkover
- r = Retired
- d = Defaulted

=== Finals ===
Semifinals
5	(Spain) Marcel Granollers (Argentina) Horacio Zeballos	4	7^{9}	[10]
(Italy) Simone Bolelli (Italy) Andrea Vavassori	6	6^{7}	[8]
7	(Germany) Kevin Krawietz (Germany) Tim Pütz	4	1
(Netherlands) Wesley Koolhof (Croatia) Nikola Mektić	6	6

Final
5	(Spain) Marcel Granollers (Argentina) Horacio Zeballos	6^{2}	6^{4}
(Netherlands) Wesley Koolhof (Croatia) Nikola Mektić	7^{7}	7^{7}

=== Top half ===
First round
1	(India) R Bopanna (Australia) M Ebden	6^{1}	6	[8]
(Belgium) S Gillé (Belgium) J Vliegen	7^{7}	4	[10]
(France) N Mahut (France) É Roger-Vasselin	2	6	[11]
(Spain) A Davidovich Fokina (Germany) A Mies	6	2	[9]
K Khachanov; A Rublev	5	1
(Italy) J Sinner (Italy) L Sonego	7	6
(United States) C Eubanks (United States) B Shelton	2	4
5	(Spain) M Granollers (Argentina) H Zeballos	6	6
4	(Mexico) S González (United Kingdom) N Skupski	6	3	[5]
Alt	(Italy) L Musetti (Australia) J Peers	3	6	[10]
(United States) T Fritz (Czech Republic) J Lehečka	3	5
(United States) N Lammons (United States) J Withrow	6	7
(Monaco) H Nys (Poland) J Zieliński	4	4
(Italy) S Bolelli (Italy) A Vavassori	6	6
(France) U Humbert (France) F Martin	6^{7}	3
8	(United Kingdom) J Murray (New Zealand) M Venus	7^{9}	6

Second round
(Belgium) S Gillé (Belgium) J Vliegen	4	5
(France) N Mahut (France) É Roger-Vasselin	6	7
(Italy) J Sinner (Italy) L Sonego	6^{0}	3
5	(Spain) M Granollers (Argentina) H Zeballos	7^{7}	6
Alt	(Italy) L Musetti (Australia) J Peers	3	3
(United States) N Lammons (United States) J Withrow	6	6
(Italy) S Bolelli (Italy) A Vavassori	w/o
8	(United Kingdom) J Murray (New Zealand) M Venus

Quarterfinals
(France) N Mahut (France) É Roger-Vasselin
5	(Spain) M Granollers (Argentina) H Zeballos	w/o
(United States) N Lammons (United States) J Withrow	6^{4}	1
(Italy) S Bolelli (Italy) A Vavassori	7^{7}	6

Semifinals
5	(Spain) M Granollers (Argentina) H Zeballos	4	7^{9}	[10]
(Italy) S Bolelli (Italy) A Vavassori	6	6^{7}	[8]

=== Bottom half ===
First round
7	(Germany) K Krawietz (Germany) T Pütz	7^{8}	7^{8}
(Kazakhstan) A Bublik (France) A Mannarino	6^{6}	6^{6}
(El Salvador) M Arévalo (Croatia) M Pavić	6	6
(Chile) N Jarry (Australia) M Purcell	1	4
WC	(Canada) F Auger-Aliassime (United States) S Korda	6	6^{4}	[3]
(United Kingdom) L Glasspool (Netherlands) J-J Rojer	3	7^{7}	[10]
Alt	(France) S Doumbia (France) F Reboul	6^{5}	3
3	(United States) R Ram (United Kingdom) J Salisbury	7^{7}	6
6	(Argentina) M González (Argentina) A Molteni	6	5	[8]
WC	(United States) R Seggerman (United States) P Trhac	3	7	[10]
WC	(United States) S Johnson (United States) T Paul	2	6^{3}
(Netherlands) W Koolhof (Croatia) N Mektić	6	7^{7}
Alt	(New Zealand) M Daniell (Australia) J-P Smith	2	4
(Brazil) M Melo (Germany) A Zverev	6	6
(Netherlands) T Griekspoor (Poland) H Hurkacz	1	6	[7]
2	(Croatia) I Dodig (United States) A Krajicek	6	3	[10]

Second round
7	(Germany) K Krawietz (Germany) T Pütz	5	6	[10]
(El Salvador) M Arévalo (Croatia) M Pavić	7	4	[5]
(United Kingdom) L Glasspool (Netherlands) J-J Rojer	6	6
3	(United States) R Ram (United Kingdom) J Salisbury	4	1
WC	(United States) R Seggerman (United States) P Trhac	4	6^{6}
(Netherlands) W Koolhof (Croatia) N Mektić	6	7^{8}
(Brazil) M Melo (Germany) A Zverev	3	4
2	(Croatia) I Dodig (United States) A Krajicek	6	6

Quarterfinals
7	(Germany) K Krawietz (Germany) T Pütz	6	5	[10]
(United Kingdom) L Glasspool (Netherlands) J-J Rojer	3	7	[8]
(Netherlands) W Koolhof (Croatia) N Mektić	6	6^{9}	[10]
2	(Croatia) I Dodig (United States) A Krajicek	4	7^{11}	[7]

Semifinals
7	(Germany) K Krawietz (Germany) T Pütz	4	1
(Netherlands) W Koolhof (Croatia) N Mektić	6	6

== Seeded teams ==
The following are the seeded teams, based on ATP rankings as of March 4, 2024.

Country	Player	Country	Player	Rank	Seed
IND	Rohan Bopanna	AUS	Matthew Ebden	3	1
CRO	Ivan Dodig	USA	Austin Krajicek	7	2
USA	Rajeev Ram	GBR	Joe Salisbury	11	3
MEX	Santiago González	GBR	Neal Skupski	17	4
ESP	Marcel Granollers	ARG	Horacio Zeballos	21	5
ARG	Máximo González	ARG	Andrés Molteni	26	6
GER	Kevin Krawietz	GER	Tim Pütz	33	7
GBR	Jamie Murray	NZL	Michael Venus	33	8

== Other entry information ==
=== Wildcards ===
- (Canada) Félix Auger-Aliassime / (United States) Sebastian Korda
- (United States) Steve Johnson / (United States) Tommy Paul
- (United States) Ryan Seggerman / (United States) Patrik Trhac

=== Alternates ===
- (New Zealand) Marcus Daniell / (Australia) John-Patrick Smith
- (France) Sadio Doumbia / (France) Fabien Reboul
- (Italy) Lorenzo Musetti / (Australia) John Peers

=== Withdrawals ===
- (Argentina) Francisco Cerúndolo / (United Kingdom) Cameron Norrie → replaced by (Italy) Lorenzo Musetti / (Australia) John Peers
- (Australia) Alex de Minaur / (Australia) Alexei Popyrin → replaced by (France) Sadio Doumbia / (France) Fabien Reboul
- (Bulgaria) Grigor Dimitrov / (United Kingdom) Dan Evans → replaced by (New Zealand) Marcus Daniell / (Australia) John-Patrick Smith
