= 2024 BNP Paribas Open – Mixed doubles =

Tennis tournament event

Mixed doubles
- 2024 BNP Paribas Open

Final
- Champions: (Australia) Storm Hunter (Australia) Matthew Ebden
- Runners-up: (France) Caroline Garcia (France) Édouard Roger-Vasselin
- Score: 6–3, 6–3
- Date: 15 March 2024

Details
- Draw: 8

Events
Singles	men	women
Doubles	men	women	mixed
- Indian Wells Open

For the first time, a Mixed Doubles Invitational was held at the Indian Wells Tennis Garden alongside main draw play of the ATP and WTA 1000 tournament. The eight-team event was in a knockout format and offered $150,000 in total prize money.

Storm Hunter and Matthew Ebden won the inaugural edition by defeating Caroline Garcia and Édouard Roger-Vasselin in the final, 6–3, 6–3.

== Draw ==
Key

- Q = Qualifier
- WC = Wild card
- LL = Lucky loser
- Alt = Alternate
- ITF = ITF entry
- PR = Protected ranking
- SR = Special ranking
- SE = Special exempt
- JE = Junior exempt
- JR = Junior Accelerator Programme entrant
- CO = College Accelerator Programme entrant
- NG = Next Gen Accelerator Program entrant
- w/o = Walkover
- r = Retired
- d = Defaulted

=== Draw ===
Quarterfinals
(Australia) Storm Hunter (Australia) Matthew Ebden	6	7
(Japan) Ena Shibahara (United Kingdom) Joe Salisbury	3	5
(Czech Republic) Kateřina Siniaková (Czech Republic) Tomáš Macháč	5	5
(United States) Taylor Townsend (United States) Jackson Withrow	7	7
(Australia) Daria Saville (Australia) John Peers	5	6	[11]
(United States) Bethanie Mattek-Sands (Croatia) Mate Pavić	7	4	[9]
(United States) Desirae Krawczyk (Australia) Andrew Harris	4	7^{7}	[8]
(France) Caroline Garcia (France) Édouard Roger-Vasselin	6	6^{5}	[10]

Semifinals
(Australia) S Hunter (Australia) M Ebden	6	5	[10]
(United States) T Townsend (United States) J Withrow	4	7	[3]
(Australia) D Saville (Australia) J Peers	3	7^{8}	[8]
(France) C Garcia (France) É Roger-Vasselin	6	6^{6}	[10]

Final
(Australia) S Hunter (Australia) M Ebden	6	6
(France) C Garcia (France) É Roger-Vasselin	3	3
