= 2023 Monterrey Open – Singles =

Singles
- 2023 Monterrey Open

Final
- Champion: (Croatia) Donna Vekić
- Runner-up: (France) Caroline Garcia
- Score: 6–4, 3–6, 7–5

Details
- Draw: 32
- Seeds: 8

Events
Singles	Doubles
← 2022 ·	Monterrey Open	· 2024 →

Donna Vekić defeated Caroline Garcia in the final, 6–4, 3–6, 7–5 to win the women's singles tennis title at the 2023 Monterrey Open. It was her fourth career WTA title.

Leylah Fernandez was the two-time defending champion, but chose not to participate this year.

== Seeds ==
1. (France) Caroline Garcia (final)
2. (Czech Republic) Marie Bouzková (first round)
3. (Croatia) Donna Vekić (champion)
4. (Belgium) Elise Mertens (semifinals)
5. (China) Zhu Lin (semifinals)
6. (Czech Republic) Kateřina Siniaková (first round)
7. (Egypt) Mayar Sherif (quarterfinals)
8. (Italy) Elisabetta Cocciaretto (quarterfinals)

== Draw ==
=== Key ===
- Q = Qualifier
- WC = Wild card
- LL = Lucky loser
- Alt = Alternate
- SE = Special exempt
- PR = Protected ranking
- ITF = ITF entry
- JE = Junior exempt
- w/o = Walkover
- r = Retired
- d = Defaulted
- SR = Special ranking

=== Finals ===
Semifinals
1	(France) Caroline Garcia	6	6
4	(Belgium) Elise Mertens	3	4
3	(Croatia) Donna Vekić	7	6
5	(China) Zhu Lin	5	2

Final
1	(France) Caroline Garcia	4	6	5
3	(Croatia) Donna Vekić	6	3	7

=== Top half ===
First round
1	(France) C Garcia	6	6
(Slovenia) K Juvan	3	4
(Spain) N Párrizas Díaz	7^{7}	2	6
(China) Xiy Wang	6^{5}	6	4
Q	(United States) S Vickery	3	4
(China) Xin Wang	6	6
(Colombia) C Osorio	6^{5}	2^{r}
7	(Egypt) M Sherif	7^{7}	4
4	(Belgium) E Mertens	6	6
D Shnaider	0	4
Q	(Romania) E-G Ruse	6	7
(Italy) C Giorgi	4	5
(Italy) L Bronzetti	1	0
(Germany) T Maria	6	6
LL	(Spain) M Bassols Ribera	5	2
8	(Italy) E Cocciaretto	7	6

Second round
1	(France) C Garcia	6	6
(Spain) N Párrizas Díaz	3	2
(China) Xin Wang	6	6^{6}	4
7	(Egypt) M Sherif	3	7^{8}	6
4	(Belgium) E Mertens	6	3	6
Q	(Romania) E-G Ruse	3	6	2
(Germany) T Maria	6^{5}	6^{3}
8	(Italy) E Cocciaretto	7^{7}	7^{7}

Quarterfinals
1	(France) C Garcia	6	6
7	(Egypt) M Sherif	0	4
4	(Belgium) E Mertens	6	6
8	(Italy) E Cocciaretto	2	2

Semifinals
1	(France) C Garcia	6	6
4	(Belgium) E Mertens	3	4

=== Bottom half ===
First round
6	(Czech Republic) K Siniaková	6^{6}	6	6^{5}
Q	K Rakhimova	7^{8}	2	7^{7}
Q	(Greece) D Papamichail	6^{5}	6	1
(Belgium) Y Bonaventure	7^{7}	4	6
WC	(United States) E Navarro	6	6
(France) L Jeanjean	4	2
Q	(Ukraine) L Tsurenko	6	0^{r}
3	(Croatia) D Vekić	2	5
5	(China) L Zhu	6	7^{7}
(Hungary) A Bondár	4	6^{4}
WC	(Mexico) F Contreras Gómez	6^{4}	6^{4}
(Canada) R Marino	7^{7}	7^{7}
Q	(United States) C Dolehide	6	6
(Germany) J Niemeier	1	0
(Slovakia) AK Schmiedlová	6	6
2/WC	(Czech Republic) M Bouzková	4	2

Second round
Q	K Rakhimova	6^{2}	6	3
(Belgium) Y Bonaventure	7^{7}	1	6
WC	(United States) E Navarro	3	2
3	(Croatia) D Vekić	6	6
5	(China) L Zhu	7^{7}	2	6
(Canada) R Marino	6^{4}	6	3
Q	(United States) C Dolehide	6	6
(Slovakia) AK Schmiedlová	2	4

Quarterfinals
(Belgium) Y Bonaventure	2	7	6^{5}
3	(Croatia) D Vekić	6	5	7^{7}
5	(China) L Zhu	6	6
Q	(United States) C Dolehide	3	2

Semifinals
3	(Croatia) D Vekić	7	6
5	(China) L Zhu	5	2

== Qualifying ==
=== Seeds ===
1. Kamilla Rakhimova (qualified)
2. (Ukraine) Lesia Tsurenko (qualified)
3. (Brazil) Laura Pigossi (first round)
4. (Switzerland) Simona Waltert (first round)
5. (Spain) Marina Bassols Ribera (qualifying competition, lucky loser)
6. (Italy) Lucrezia Stefanini (first round)
7. (Australia) Kimberly Birrell (qualifying competition)
8. (Sweden) Rebecca Peterson (special exempt to main draw)
9. (Croatia) Ana Konjuh (qualifying competition)
10. (Spain) Aliona Bolsova (qualifying competition)
11. (Greece) Despina Papamichail (qualified)
12. (United States) Katrina Scott (first round)

=== Qualifiers ===
1. Kamilla Rakhimova
2. (Ukraine) Lesia Tsurenko
3. (United States) Caroline Dolehide
4. (Romania) Elena-Gabriela Ruse
5. (Greece) Despina Papamichail
6. (United States) Sachia Vickery

=== Lucky loser ===
1. (Spain) Marina Bassols Ribera

=== Qualifying draw ===
==== First qualifier ====
First round
1	Kamilla Rakhimova	7^{7}	6
(Colombia) Yuliana Lizarazo	6^{5}	4
(France) Carole Monnet	3	0
7	(Australia) Kimberly Birrell	6	6

Qualifying competition
1	Kamilla Rakhimova	6	4	7
7	(Australia) Kimberly Birrell	2	6	5

==== Second qualifier ====
First round
2	(Ukraine) Lesia Tsurenko	6	6
(Italy) Camilla Rosatello	4	2
WC	(Mexico) Victoria Rodríguez	4	3
9	(Croatia) Ana Konjuh	6	6

Qualifying competition
2	(Ukraine) Lesia Tsurenko	6	7^{7}
9	(Croatia) Ana Konjuh	1	6^{5}

==== Third qualifier ====
First round
3	(Brazil) Laura Pigossi	2	4
(United States) Caroline Dolehide	6	6
(Mexico) Marcela Zacarías	6	6
Alt	(Venezuela) Andrea Gámiz	4	0

Qualifying competition
(United States) Caroline Dolehide	6	7
(Mexico) Marcela Zacarías	4	5

==== Fourth qualifier ====
First round
4	(Switzerland) Simona Waltert	7^{7}	0	2
(Romania) Elena-Gabriela Ruse	6^{4}	6	6
(Czech Republic) Jesika Malečková	3	6	6
12	(United States) Katrina Scott	6	4	3

Qualifying competition
(Romania) Elena-Gabriela Ruse	5	6	6
(Czech Republic) Jesika Malečková	7	3	1

==== Fifth qualifier ====
First round
5	(Spain) Marina Bassols Ribera	6	2	6
WC	(Mexico) Renata Zarazúa	4	6	4
WC	(Mexico) Lya Isabel Fernández Olivares	1	1
11	(Greece) Despina Papamichail	6	6

Qualifying competition
5	(Spain) Marina Bassols Ribera	4	4
11	(Greece) Despina Papamichail	6	6

==== Sixth qualifier ====
First round
6	(Italy) Lucrezia Stefanini	7^{7}	0	4
(United States) Sachia Vickery	6^{5}	6	6
WC	(Mexico) Ana Sofía Sánchez	2	7^{7}	0
10	(Spain) Aliona Bolsova	6	6^{3}	6

Qualifying competition
(United States) Sachia Vickery	6	6
10	(Spain) Aliona Bolsova	2	0
