= 2023 Monterrey Open – Doubles =

Doubles
- 2023 Monterrey Open

Final
- Champions: (Colombia) Yuliana Lizarazo (Colombia) María Paulina Pérez
- Runners-up: (Australia) Kimberly Birrell (Mexico) Fernanda Contreras Gómez
- Score: 6–3, 5–7, [10–5]

Details
- Draw: 16
- Seeds: 4

Events
| Singles | Doubles |
| ← 2022 · | Monterrey Open | · 2024 → |

Yuliana Lizarazo and María Paulina Pérez defeated Kimberly Birrell and Fernanda Contreras Gómez in the final, 6–3, 5–7, [10–5] to win the doubles tennis title at the 2023 Monterrey Open.

Catherine Harrison and Sabrina Santamaria were the reigning champions, but Harrison chose not to participate this year. Santamaria partnered Kaitlyn Christian, but lost in the quarterfinals to Han Xinyun and Lidziya Marozava.

== Seeds ==
1. (Hungary) Anna Bondár / (Romania) Elena-Gabriela Ruse (semifinals, withdrew)
2. (United Kingdom) Alicia Barnett / (United Kingdom) Olivia Nicholls (first round)
3. (United States) Kaitlyn Christian / (United States) Sabrina Santamaria (quarterfinals)
4. (Czech Republic) Anastasia Dețiuc / (Japan) Eri Hozumi (first round)

== Draw ==
=== Key ===
- Q = Qualifier
- WC = Wild card
- LL = Lucky loser
- Alt = Alternate
- SE = Special exempt
- PR = Protected ranking
- ITF = ITF entry
- JE = Junior exempt
- w/o = Walkover
- r = Retired
- d = Defaulted
- SR = Special ranking

=== Draw ===
First round
1 | (Hungary) A Bondár (Romania) E-G Ruse | 2 | 7 | [12]
(Czech Republic) J Malečková (Greece) D Papamichail | 6 | 5 | [10]
(Netherlands) R van der Hoek (Chinese Taipei) F-h Wu | 7 | 6
(Belgium) Y Bonaventure (Italy) L Bronzetti | 5 | 3
4 | (Czech Republic) A Dețiuc (Japan) E Hozumi | 3 | 3
(United Kingdom) E Appleton (Netherlands) I Haverlag | 6 | 6
WC | (Mexico) M Zacarías (Mexico) R Zarazúa | 5 | 6 | [5]
(Colombia) Y Lizarazo (Colombia) MP Pérez | 7 | 4 | [10]
(China) X Han; L Marozava | 6^{4} | 6 | [13]
(United Kingdom) F Christie (United Kingdom) A Collins | 7^{7} | 4 | [11]
(Venezuela) A Gámiz (Brazil) I Gamarra Martins | 5 | 4
3 | (United States) K Christian (United States) S Santamaria | 7 | 6
(Slovakia) T Mihalíková (Egypt) M Sherif | 6^{3} | 7 | [10]
(Georgia (country)) N Dzalamidze (Canada) R Marino | 7^{7} | 5 | [4]
WC | (Australia) K Birrell (Mexico) F Contreras Gómez | 6 | 6
2 | (United Kingdom) A Barnett (United Kingdom) O Nicholls | 4 | 4

Quarterfinals
1 | (Hungary) A Bondár (Romania) E-G Ruse | 7^{7} | 6
(Netherlands) R van der Hoek (Chinese Taipei) F-h Wu | 6^{1} | 0
(United Kingdom) E Appleton (Netherlands) I Haverlag | 6^{3} | 4
(Colombia) Y Lizarazo (Colombia) MP Pérez | 7^{7} | 6
(China) X Han; L Marozava | 6 | 6
3 | (United States) K Christian (United States) S Santamaria | 1 | 3
(Slovakia) T Mihalíková (Egypt) M Sherif | 3 | 6 | [9]
WC | (Australia) K Birrell (Mexico) F Contreras Gómez | 6 | 4 | [11]

Semifinals
1 | (Hungary) A Bondár (Romania) E-G Ruse
(Colombia) Y Lizarazo (Colombia) MP Pérez | w/o
(China) X Han; L Marozava | 4 | 1
WC | (Australia) K Birrell (Mexico) F Contreras Gómez | 6 | 6

Final
(Colombia) Y Lizarazo (Colombia) MP Pérez | 6 | 5 | [10]
WC | (Australia) K Birrell (Mexico) F Contreras Gómez | 3 | 7 | [5]
