= 2024 BNP Paribas Open – Men's singles =

Tennis tournament event

Men's singles
- 2024 BNP Paribas Open

Final
- Champion: (Spain) Carlos Alcaraz
- Runner-up: Daniil Medvedev
- Score: 7–6^{(7–5)}, 6–1

Details
- Draw: 96 (12 Q / 5 WC )
- Seeds: 32

Events
Singles	men	women
Doubles	men	women	mixed
- Indian Wells Open

Defending champion Carlos Alcaraz defeated Daniil Medvedev in a rematch of the previous year's final, 7–6^{(7–5)}, 6–1 to win the men's singles tennis title at the 2024 Indian Wells Open. It was his fifth Masters 1000 title and 13th career ATP Tour title. Alcaraz was the first player to defend the title since Novak Djokovic in 2016, and the eighth overall; he was the second player to do so before turning 21, after Boris Becker in 1988.

Alcaraz and Medvedev were the second pair of men's players to contest consecutive Indian Wells finals, following Djokovic and Roger Federer in 2014 and 2015.

Alcaraz defeated Jannik Sinner in the semifinals, snapping Sinner's 19-match winning streak dating back to the 2023 Davis Cup Finals. Djokovic was attempting to win a record sixth Indian Wells title, but lost in the third round to Luca Nardi. Ranked No. 123 in the world, Nardi was the lowest-ranked player to defeat Djokovic at the Masters level or higher (a record later surpassed by Valentin Vacherot at the 2025 Shanghai Masters), as well as the third lucky loser to defeat a reigning world No. 1, after Lorenzo Sonego at the 2020 Vienna Open and David Goffin at the 2022 Astana Open.

== Seeds ==
All seeds received a bye into the second round.

1. (Serbia) Novak Djokovic (third round)
2. (Spain) Carlos Alcaraz (champion)
3. (Italy) Jannik Sinner (semifinals)
4. Daniil Medvedev (final)
5. Andrey Rublev (third round)
6. (Germany) Alexander Zverev (quarterfinals)
7. (Denmark) Holger Rune (quarterfinals)
8. (Poland) Hubert Hurkacz (second round)
9. (Norway) Casper Ruud (quarterfinals)
10. (Australia) Alex de Minaur (fourth round)
11. (Greece) Stefanos Tsitsipas (fourth round)
12. (United States) Taylor Fritz (fourth round)
13. (Bulgaria) Grigor Dimitrov (fourth round)
14. (France) Ugo Humbert (third round)
15. Karen Khachanov (second round)
16. (United States) Ben Shelton (fourth round)
17. (United States) Tommy Paul (semifinals)
18. (United States) Frances Tiafoe (third round)
19. (Argentina) Sebastián Báez (third round)
20. (Kazakhstan) Alexander Bublik (third round)
21. (France) Adrian Mannarino (third round)
22. (Argentina) Francisco Cerúndolo (third round)
23. (Spain) Alejandro Davidovich Fokina (second round)
24. (Chile) Nicolás Jarry (second round)
25. (Germany) Jan-Lennard Struff (third round)
26. (Italy) Lorenzo Musetti (third round)
27. (Netherlands) Tallon Griekspoor (third round)
28. (United Kingdom) Cameron Norrie (third round)
29. (United States) Sebastian Korda (third round)
30. (Argentina) Tomás Martín Etcheverry (withdrew)
31. (Canada) Félix Auger-Aliassime (third round)
32. (Czech Republic) Jiří Lehečka (quarterfinals)

Click on the seed number of a player to go to their draw section.

== Draw ==
Key

- Q = Qualifier
- WC = Wild card
- LL = Lucky loser
- Alt = Alternate
- ITF = ITF entry
- PR = Protected ranking
- SR = Special ranking
- SE = Special exempt
- JE = Junior exempt
- JR = Junior Accelerator Programme entrant
- CO = College Accelerator Programme entrant
- NG = Next Gen Accelerator Program entrant
- w/o = Walkover
- r = Retired
- d = Defaulted

=== Finals ===
Quarterfinals
17	(United States) Tommy Paul	6	1	6
9	(Norway) Casper Ruud	2	6	3
4	Daniil Medvedev	7	6
7	(Denmark) Holger Rune	5	4
32	(Czech Republic) Jiří Lehečka	3	3
3	(Italy) Jannik Sinner	6	6
6	(Germany) Alexander Zverev	3	1
2	(Spain) Carlos Alcaraz	6	6

Semifinals
17	(United States) Tommy Paul	6	6^{3}	2
4	Daniil Medvedev	1	7^{7}	6
3	(Italy) Jannik Sinner	6	3	2
2	(Spain) Carlos Alcaraz	1	6	6

Final
4	Daniil Medvedev	6^{5}	1
2	(Spain) Carlos Alcaraz	7^{7}	6

=== Top half ===
==== Section 1 ====
First round
Q	(Japan) S Mochizuki	6^{4}	6^{6}
(Australia) A Vukic	7^{7}	7^{8}
WC	(United States) A Kovacevic	7^{7}	3	5
(China) Z Zhang	6^{2}	6	7
(United States) A Michelsen	6	6
(Spain) J Munar	2	3
Q	(United States) E Quinn	1	6^{1}
WC	(United States) P Kypson	6	7^{7}

Second round
1	(Serbia) N Djokovic	6	5	6
(Australia) A Vukic	2	7	3
(China) Z Zhang	3	6	3
LL	(Italy) L Nardi	6	3	6
17	(United States) T Paul	6	6
(United States) A Michelsen	2	2
WC	(United States) P Kypson	4	4
14	(France) U Humbert	6	6

Third round
1	(Serbia) N Djokovic	4	6	3
LL	(Italy) L Nardi	6	3	6
17	(United States) T Paul	6	6
14	(France) U Humbert	4	4

Fourth round
LL	(Italy) L Nardi	4	3
17	(United States) T Paul	6	6

==== Section 2 ====
First round
Q	(United States) N Moreno de Alboran	6^{8}	4
Q	(Slovakia) L Klein	7^{10}	6
(France) A Fils	7^{7}	6
(Portugal) N Borges	6^{5}	2
(Italy) L Sonego	7^{7}	6
(Serbia) M Kecmanović	6^{1}	4
(France) G Monfils	6	6
(Australia) M Purcell	1	2

Second round
9	(Norway) C Ruud	6	7^{7}
Q	(Slovakia) L Klein	4	6^{4}
(France) A Fils	6	6
23	(Spain) A Davidovich Fokina	3	4
28	(United Kingdom) C Norrie	6	6
(Italy) L Sonego	4	4
(France) G Monfils	6	6^{5}	6
8	(Poland) H Hurkacz	0	7^{7}	2

Third round
9	(Norway) C Ruud	6	6
(France) A Fils	2	4
28	(United Kingdom) C Norrie	7^{7}	6^{5}	3
(France) G Monfils	6^{5}	7^{7}	6

Fourth round
9	(Norway) C Ruud	3	7^{7}	6
(France) G Monfils	6	6^{3}	4

==== Section 3 ====
First round
(Italy) F Cobolli	4	4
(Spain) R Carballés Baena	6	6
R Safiullin	6	5	6
(United Kingdom) D Evans	1	7	2
(Switzerland) S Wawrinka	6^{3}	6	2
(Czech Republic) T Macháč	7^{7}	4	6
Q	(France) H Grenier	6^{5}	5
(France) A Müller	7^{7}	7

Second round
4	D Medvedev	6	6
(Spain) R Carballés Baena	2	3
R Safiullin	4	2
29	(United States) S Korda	6	6
21	(France) A Mannarino	6	6
(Czech Republic) T Macháč	1	2
(France) A Müller	5	2
13	(Bulgaria) G Dimitrov	7	6

Third round
4	D Medvedev	6	5	6
29	(United States) S Korda	4	7	3
21	(France) A Mannarino	3	3
13	(Bulgaria) G Dimitrov	6	6

Fourth round
4	D Medvedev	6	6
13	(Bulgaria) G Dimitrov	4	4

==== Section 4 ====
First round
P Kotov	6	3	5
(Chile) A Tabilo	4	6	7
WC	(Italy) F Fognini	4	6	6
(Spain) B Zapata Miralles	6	2	3
(Netherlands) B van de Zandschulp	1	4
PR	(Canada) D Shapovalov	6	6
PR	(Canada) M Raonic	6	6
LL	(India) S Nagal	3	3

Second round
12	(United States) T Fritz	7^{7}	6
(Chile) A Tabilo	6^{2}	2
WC	(Italy) F Fognini	5	3
19	(Argentina) S Báez	7	6
26	(Italy) L Musetti	6	2	7
PR	(Canada) D Shapovalov	4	6	5
PR	(Canada) M Raonic
7	(Denmark) H Rune	w/o

Third round
12	(United States) T Fritz	6	6
19	(Argentina) S Báez	2	2
26	(Italy) L Musetti	2	6^{5}
7	(Denmark) H Rune	6	7^{7}

Fourth round
12	(United States) T Fritz	6	6^{2}	3
7	(Denmark) H Rune	2	7^{7}	6

=== Bottom half ===
==== Section 5 ====
First round
(United Kingdom) A Murray	6	6
Q	(Belgium) D Goffin	3	2
(United States) C Eubanks	3	6^{3}
WC	(United States) B Nakashima	6	7^{7}
(Serbia) D Lajović	7	6
(Finland) E Ruusuvuori	5	2
Q	(France) L Pouille	6	6
(Germany) D Altmaier	4	3

Second round
5	A Rublev	7^{7}	6
(United Kingdom) A Murray	6^{3}	1
WC	(United States) B Nakashima	6	3	4
32	(Czech Republic) J Lehečka	3	6	6
18	(United States) F Tiafoe	6	6
(Serbia) D Lajović	3	3
Q	(France) L Pouille	3	2
11	(Greece) S Tsitsipas	6	6

Third round
5	A Rublev	4	4
32	(Czech Republic) J Lehečka	6	6
18	(United States) F Tiafoe	3	3
11	(Greece) S Tsitsipas	6	6

Fourth round
32	(Czech Republic) J Lehečka	6	6
11	(Greece) S Tsitsipas	2	4

==== Section 6 ====
First round
WC	(Czech Republic) J Menšík	6	6
Q	(South Korea) S-c Hong	3	4
(Kazakhstan) A Shevchenko	6	1	7^{7}
(Germany) D Koepfer	3	6	6^{3}
(Croatia) B Ćorić	6	3	6
(Austria) S Ofner	2	6	0
(Australia) T Kokkinakis	6	7
(United States) M Giron	3	5

Second round
16	(United States) B Shelton	4	6	6
WC	(Czech Republic) J Menšík	6	3	4
(Kazakhstan) A Shevchenko	2	1^{r}
22	(Argentina) F Cerúndolo	6	3
25	(Germany) J-L Struff	6^{3}	6	7^{11}
(Croatia) B Ćorić	7^{7}	2	6^{9}
(Australia) T Kokkinakis	3	0
3	(Italy) J Sinner	6	6

Third round
16	(United States) B Shelton	7^{7}	3	7^{7}
22	(Argentina) F Cerúndolo	6^{5}	6	6^{5}
25	(Germany) J-L Struff	3	4
3	(Italy) J Sinner	6	6

Fourth round
16	(United States) B Shelton	6^{4}	1
3	(Italy) J Sinner	7^{7}	6

==== Section 7 ====
First round
(Australia) C O'Connell	1	6	6
(United Kingdom) J Draper	6	3	2
(Germany) Y Hanfmann	6^{7}	6	6
(Argentina) P Cachín	7^{9}	4	1
Q	(China) J Shang	6	6
(Australia) J Thompson	2	3
(Japan) T Daniel	6	6
(Colombia) DE Galán	4	1

Second round
6	(Germany) A Zverev	6	6
(Australia) C O'Connell	4	4
(Germany) Y Hanfmann	3	3
27	(Netherlands) T Griekspoor	6	6
20	(Kazakhstan) A Bublik	6	6
Q	(China) J Shang	4	1
(Japan) T Daniel	1	2
10	(Australia) A de Minaur	6	6

Third round
6	(Germany) A Zverev	7^{9}	6
27	(Netherlands) T Griekspoor	6^{7}	3
20	(Kazakhstan) A Bublik	5	0
10	(Australia) A de Minaur	7	6

Fourth round
6	(Germany) A Zverev	5	6	6
10	(Australia) A de Minaur	7	2	3

==== Section 8 ====
First round
Q	(Brazil) T Seyboth Wild	6	6
(United States) JJ Wolf	2	1
(Hungary) F Marozsán	6	6
LL	(Austria) J Rodionov	3	2
Q	(France) C Lestienne	3	6	6
Q	(United States) D Kudla	6	2	4
(France) L Van Assche	6^{6}	6^{3}
(Italy) M Arnaldi	7^{8}	7^{7}

Second round
15	K Khachanov	1	5
Q	(Brazil) T Seyboth Wild	6	7
(Hungary) F Marozsán	3	7	6
24	(Chile) N Jarry	6	5	4
31	(Canada) F Auger-Aliassime	6	6
Q	(France) C Lestienne	4	1
(Italy) M Arnaldi	7^{7}	0	1
2	(Spain) C Alcaraz	6^{5}	6	6

Third round
Q	(Brazil) T Seyboth Wild	2	2
(Hungary) F Marozsán	6	6
31	(Canada) F Auger-Aliassime	2	3
2	(Spain) C Alcaraz	6	6

Fourth round
(Hungary) F Marozsán	3	3
2	(Spain) C Alcaraz	6	6

== Seeded players ==
The following are the seeded players. Seedings are based on ATP rankings as of March 4, 2024. Rankings and points before are as of March 4, 2024.

Seed	Rank	Player	Points before	Points defending	Points earned	Points after	Status
1	1	(Serbia) Novak Djokovic	9,675	0	50	9,725	Third round lost to (Italy) Luca Nardi [LL]
2	2	(Spain) Carlos Alcaraz	8,805	1,000	1,000	8,805	Champion, defeated Daniil Medvedev [4]
3	3	(Italy) Jannik Sinner	8,270	360	400 (Note: On 20 August 2024, it was announced that Sinner received an anti-doping sanction and was stripped of his money and points from the Indian Wells tournament in March, due to testing positive for Clostebol, a banned anabolic steroid. However, these points were deducted as point deduction was not applied retroactively.)	8,310	Semifinals lost to (Spain) Carlos Alcaraz [2]
4	4	Daniil Medvedev	7,715	600	650	7,765	Runner-up, lost to (Spain) Carlos Alcaraz [2]
5	5	Andrey Rublev	5,010	90	50	4,970	Third round lost to (Czech Republic) Jiří Lehečka [32]
6	6	(Germany) Alexander Zverev	4,950	90	200	5,060	Quarterfinals lost to (Spain) Carlos Alcaraz [2]
7	7	(Denmark) Holger Rune	3,720	45	200	3,875	Quarterfinals lost to Daniil Medvedev [4]
8	8	(Poland) Hubert Hurkacz	3,405	45	10	3,370	Second round lost to (France) Gaël Monfils
9	9	(Norway) Casper Ruud	3,405	45	200	3,560	Quarterfinals lost to (United States) Tommy Paul [17]
10	10	(Australia) Alex de Minaur	3,210	10	100	3,300	Fourth round lost to (Germany) Alexander Zverev [6]
11	11	(Greece) Stefanos Tsitsipas	3,170	(15)^{†}	100	3,255	Fourth round lost to (Czech Republic) Jiří Lehečka [32]
12	12	(United States) Taylor Fritz	3,015	180	100	2,935	Fourth round lost to (Denmark) Holger Rune [7]
13	13	(Bulgaria) Grigor Dimitrov	2,880	(45)^{†}	100	2,935	Fourth round lost to Daniil Medvedev [4]
14	14	(France) Ugo Humbert	2,415	45	50	2,420	Third round lost to (United States) Tommy Paul [17]
15	15	Karen Khachanov	2,300	45	10	2,265	Second round lost to (Brazil) Thiago Seyboth Wild [Q]
16	16	(United States) Ben Shelton	2,145	25	100	2,220	Fourth round lost to (Italy) Jannik Sinner [3]
17	17	(United States) Tommy Paul	2,120	90	400	2,430	Semifinals lost to Daniil Medvedev [4]
18	18	(United States) Frances Tiafoe	2,115	360	50	1,805	Third round lost to (Greece) Stefanos Tsitsipas [11]
19	19	(Argentina) Sebastián Báez	1,985	45	50	1,990	Third round lost to (United States) Taylor Fritz [12]
20	20	(Kazakhstan) Alexander Bublik	1,984	(32)^{‡}	50	2,002	Third round lost to (Australia) Alex de Minaur [10]
21	21	(France) Adrian Mannarino	1,950	45	50	1,955	Third round lost to (Bulgaria) Grigor Dimitrov [13]
22	22	(Argentina) Francisco Cerúndolo	1,840	45	50	1,845	Third round lost to (United States) Ben Shelton [16]
23	23	(Spain) Alejandro Davidovich Fokina	1,595	180	10	1,425	Second round lost to (France) Arthur Fils
24	24	(Chile) Nicolás Jarry	1,575	(10)^{§}	10	1,575	Second round lost to (Hungary) Fábián Marozsán
25	25	(Germany) Jan-Lennard Struff	1,531	41+66	50+10	1,484	Third round lost to (Italy) Jannik Sinner [3]
26	26	(Italy) Lorenzo Musetti	1,480	10	50	1,520	Third round lost to (Denmark) Holger Rune [7]
27	27	(Netherlands) Tallon Griekspoor	1,445	45	50	1,450	Third round lost to (Germany) Alexander Zverev [6]
28	28	(United Kingdom) Cameron Norrie	1,380	180	50	1,250	Third round lost to (France) Gaël Monfils
29	29	(United States) Sebastian Korda	1,345	0	50	1,395	Third round lost to Daniil Medvedev [4]
30	30	(Argentina) Tomás Martín Etcheverry	1,335	10	0	1,325	Withdrew
31	31	(Canada) Félix Auger-Aliassime	1,295	180	50	1,165	Third round lost to (Spain) Carlos Alcaraz [2]
32	32	(Czech Republic) Jiří Lehečka	1,260	25	200	1,435	Quarterfinals lost to (Italy) Jannik Sinner [3]

† The player's 2023 points were replaced by a better result for purposes of his ranking as of March 4, 2024. Points for his 19th best result will be deducted instead.
‡ The player's 2023 points were replaced by a better result for purposes of his ranking as of March 4, 2024. Points for an ATP Challenger Tour event (Phoenix) held during the second week of the 2023 tournament will be deducted instead.
§ The player did not qualify for the main draw in 2023. Points for his 19th best result will be deducted instead.

== Other entry information ==
=== Wildcards ===
- (Italy) Fabio Fognini
- (United States) Aleksandar Kovacevic
- (United States) Patrick Kypson
- (Czech Republic) Jakub Menšík
- (United States) Brandon Nakashima

=== Protected ranking ===
- ~~(Spain) Rafael Nadal~~
- (Canada) Milos Raonic
- (Canada) Denis Shapovalov

=== Withdrawals ===
- ‡ (Serbia) Laslo Djere → replaced by (Spain) Bernabé Zapata Miralles
- § (Argentina) Tomás Martín Etcheverry → replaced by (Italy) Luca Nardi
- ‡ Aslan Karatsev → replaced by (Australia) Thanasi Kokkinakis
- ‡ (United States) Mackenzie McDonald → replaced by (Colombia) Daniel Elahi Galán
- § (Spain) Rafael Nadal → replaced by (India) Sumit Nagal
- § (Australia) Alexei Popyrin → replaced by (Austria) Jurij Rodionov

‡ – withdrew from entry list
§ – withdrew from main draw

== Qualifying ==
=== Seeds ===
1. (Brazil) Thiago Seyboth Wild (qualified)
2. (Australia) Rinky Hijikata (first round)
3. (Japan) Yoshihito Nishioka (first round)
4. (France) Hugo Gaston (first round)
5. (France) Arthur Cazaux (first round)
6. (Austria) Jurij Rodionov (qualifying competition, lucky loser)
7. (Germany) Maximilian Marterer (first round)
8. (India) Sumit Nagal (qualifying competition, lucky loser)
9. (France) Constant Lestienne (qualified)
10. (France) Quentin Halys (first round)
11. (Italy) Luca Nardi (qualifying competition, lucky loser)
12. (France) Benoît Paire (first round)
13. (Belgium) David Goffin (qualified)
14. (Czech Republic) Vít Kopřiva (qualifying competition)
15. (Serbia) Hamad Medjedovic (first round)
16. (Argentina) Diego Schwartzman (first round)
17. (Croatia) Duje Ajduković (first round)
18. (United States) Michael Mmoh (first round)
19. (Japan) Yosuke Watanuki (withdrew)
20. (United Kingdom) Liam Broady (qualifying competition)
21. (Brazil) Felipe Meligeni Alves (first round)
22. (France) Harold Mayot (qualifying competition)
23. (Italy) Andrea Vavassori (qualifying competition)
24. (United States) Emilio Nava (qualifying competition)

=== Qualifiers ===
1. (Brazil) Thiago Seyboth Wild
2. (France) Lucas Pouille
3. (China) Shang Juncheng
4. (United States) Denis Kudla
5. (Japan) Shintaro Mochizuki
6. (United States) Nicolas Moreno de Alboran
7. (Slovakia) Lukáš Klein
8. (South Korea) Hong Seong-chan
9. (France) Constant Lestienne
10. (United States) Ethan Quinn
11. (Belgium) David Goffin
12. (France) Hugo Grenier

=== Lucky losers ===
1. (Austria) Jurij Rodionov
2. (India) Sumit Nagal
3. (Italy) Luca Nardi

=== Qualifying draw ===
==== First qualifier ====
First round
1	(Brazil) Thiago Seyboth Wild	6	6
(Australia) Adam Walton	1	3
(Australia) Marc Polmans	3	2
20	(United Kingdom) Liam Broady	6	6

Qualifying competition
1	(Brazil) Thiago Seyboth Wild	6	6
20	(United Kingdom) Liam Broady	1	1

==== Second qualifier ====
First round
2	(Australia) Rinky Hijikata	7	1	3
WC	(France) Lucas Pouille	5	6	6
(Kazakhstan) Beibit Zhukayev	3	1
22	(France) Harold Mayot	6	6

Qualifying competition
WC	(France) Lucas Pouille	0	6	6
22	(France) Harold Mayot	6	4	2

==== Third qualifier ====
First round
3	(Japan) Yoshihito Nishioka	6	6^{12}	3
(China) Shang Juncheng	4	7^{14}	6
(Argentina) Facundo Bagnis	3	6	6
18	(United States) Michael Mmoh	6	4	4

Qualifying competition
(China) Shang Juncheng	6	7
(Argentina) Facundo Bagnis	2	5

==== Fourth qualifier ====
First round
4	(France) Hugo Gaston	1	3
(United States) Denis Kudla	6	6
WC	(United States) Steve Johnson	7^{8}	6^{10}	4
24	(United States) Emilio Nava	6^{6}	7^{12}	6

Qualifying competition
(United States) Denis Kudla	6	6
24	(United States) Emilio Nava	2	4

==== Fifth qualifier ====
First round
5	(France) Arthur Cazaux	4	4
(Germany) Benjamin Hassan	6	6
(Japan) Shintaro Mochizuki	6	6
16	(Argentina) Diego Schwartzman	4	3

Qualifying competition
(Germany) Benjamin Hassan	4	6^{4}
(Japan) Shintaro Mochizuki	6	7^{7}

==== Sixth qualifier ====
First round
6	(Austria) Jurij Rodionov	6	6
(Italy) Federico Gaio	1	2
(United States) Nicolas Moreno de Alboran	6	6
21	(Brazil) Felipe Meligeni Alves	3	1

Qualifying competition
6	(Austria) Jurij Rodionov	3	6	3
(United States) Nicolas Moreno de Alboran	6	4	6

==== Seventh qualifier ====
First round
7	(Germany) Maximilian Marterer	2	4
(Slovakia) Lukáš Klein	6	6
(United States) Zachary Svajda	2	6	6
17	(Croatia) Duje Ajduković	6	2	0

Qualifying competition
(Slovakia) Lukáš Klein	6	6^{6}	6
(United States) Zachary Svajda	4	7^{8}	3

==== Eighth qualifier ====
First round
8	(India) Sumit Nagal	6	6
WC	(United States) Stefan Dostanic	2	2
PR	(South Korea) Kwon Soon-woo	3	3
Alt	(South Korea) Hong Seong-chan	6	6

Qualifying competition
8	(India) Sumit Nagal	6	2	6^{4}
Alt	(South Korea) Hong Seong-chan	2	6	7^{7}

==== Ninth qualifier ====
First round
9	(France) Constant Lestienne	6	7^{9}
(Sweden) Elias Ymer	4	6^{7}
WC	(United States) Cooper Woestendick	2	3
14	(Czech Republic) Vít Kopřiva	6	6

Qualifying competition
9	(France) Constant Lestienne	6	6
14	(Czech Republic) Vít Kopřiva	1	3

==== Tenth qualifier ====
First round
10	(France) Quentin Halys	1	5
WC	(United States) Ethan Quinn	6	7
(Bosnia and Herzegovina) Damir Džumhur	4	3
23	(Italy) Andrea Vavassori	6	6

Qualifying competition
WC	(United States) Ethan Quinn	4	6	6
23	(Italy) Andrea Vavassori	6	1	2

==== Eleventh qualifier ====
First round
11	(Italy) Luca Nardi	6	6
(France) Térence Atmane	4	0
(United States) Maxime Cressy	7^{7}	3	3
13	(Belgium) David Goffin	6^{5}	6	6

Qualifying competition
11	(Italy) Luca Nardi	6^{4}	7	4
13	(Belgium) David Goffin	7^{7}	5	6

==== Twelfth qualifier ====
First round
12	(France) Benoît Paire	6^{5}	3
(Slovakia) Alex Molčan	7^{7}	6
(France) Hugo Grenier	6	6
15	(Serbia) Hamad Medjedovic	1	1

Qualifying competition
(Slovakia) Alex Molčan	3	2
(France) Hugo Grenier	6	6
