= 2025 Monterrey Open – Singles =

Singles
- 2025 Monterrey Open

Final
- Champion: Diana Shnaider
- Runner-up: Ekaterina Alexandrova
- Score: 6–3, 4–6, 6–4

Details
- Draw: 28
- Seeds: 8

Events
Singles	Doubles
- Monterrey Open

Diana Shnaider defeated Ekaterina Alexandrova in the final, 6–3, 4–6, 6–4 to win the singles tennis title at the 2025 Monterrey Open. It was her fifth WTA Tour singles title, and she saved five match points en route, in the quarterfinals against Elise Mertens.

Linda Nosková was the defending champion, but lost in the quarterfinals to Alexandrova.

== Seeds ==
The top four seeds received a bye into the second round.

1. (United States) Emma Navarro (second round)
2. Ekaterina Alexandrova (final)
3. Diana Shnaider (champion)
4. (Brazil) Beatriz Haddad Maia (second round)
5. (Belgium) Elise Mertens (quarterfinals)
6. (Czech Republic) Linda Nosková (quarterfinals)
7. (Canada) Leylah Fernandez (second round)
8. Anastasia Pavlyuchenkova (first round)

== Draw ==
Key

- Q = Qualifier
- WC = Wild card
- LL = Lucky loser
- Alt = Alternate
- ITF = ITF entry
- PR = Protected ranking
- SR = Special ranking
- SE = Special exempt
- JE = Junior exempt
- JR = Junior Accelerator Programme entrant
- CO = College Accelerator Programme entrant
- NG = Next Gen Accelerator Program entrant
- w/o = Walkover
- r = Retired
- d = Defaulted

=== Finals ===
Semifinals
(United States) Alycia Parks	3	6^{8}
3	Diana Shnaider	6	7^{10}
(Czech Republic) Marie Bouzková	3	0^{r}
2	Ekaterina Alexandrova	6	0

Final
3	Diana Shnaider	6	4	6
2	Ekaterina Alexandrova	3	6	4

=== Top half ===
First round
Q	(Spain) C Bucșa	2	1
(United States) A Parks	6	6
(Slovakia) R Šramková	6	6
WC	(Mexico) V Rodríguez	0	3
(Romania) J Cristian	3	5
7	(Canada) L Fernandez	6	7
(Spain) J Bouzas Maneiro	4	5
K Rakhimova	6	7
WC	(Greece) M Sakkari	2	3
(Croatia) D Vekić	6	6
A Blinkova	4	3
5	(Belgium) E Mertens	6	6

Second round
1/WC	(United States) E Navarro	6	3	2
(United States) A Parks	4	6	6
(Slovakia) R Šramková	2	6	6
7	(Canada) L Fernandez	6	3	2
3	D Shnaider	7^{7}	6
K Rakhimova	6^{3}	1
(Croatia) D Vekić	3	3
5	(Belgium) E Mertens	6	6

Quarterfinals
(United States) A Parks	6	7
(Slovakia) R Šramková	2	5
3	D Shnaider	3	7^{8}	7^{7}
5	(Belgium) E Mertens	6	6^{6}	6^{4}

Semifinals
(United States) A Parks	3	6^{8}
3	D Shnaider	6	7^{10}

=== Bottom half ===
First round
8	A Pavlyuchenkova	6^{4}	1
Q	(Croatia) A Ružić	7^{7}	6
Q	(France) L Jeanjean	3	4
(Italy) E Cocciaretto	6	6
(Czech Republic) M Bouzková	3	6	6
(Turkey) Z Sönmez	6	2	4
6	(Czech Republic) L Nosková	7^{7}	7^{9}
Q	(New Zealand) L Sun	6^{2}	6^{7}
(Hungary) A Bondár	6^{5}	5
(Germany) T Maria	7^{7}	7
(Mexico) R Zarazúa	6	3	6^{1}
WC	(Australia) A Tomljanović	4	6	7^{7}

Second round
Q	(Croatia) A Ružić	7^{7}	2	6
(Italy) E Cocciaretto	6^{2}	6	0
(Czech Republic) M Bouzková	6	6
4	(Brazil) B Haddad Maia	3	4
6	(Czech Republic) L Nosková	6	6
(Germany) T Maria	3	2
WC	(Australia) A Tomljanović	4	3
2	E Alexandrova	6	6

Quarterfinals
Q	(Croatia) A Ružić	3	2
(Czech Republic) M Bouzková	6	6
6	(Czech Republic) L Nosková	6^{5}	6	2
2	E Alexandrova	7^{7}	4	6

Semifinals
(Czech Republic) M Bouzková	3	0^{r}
2	E Alexandrova	6	0

== Qualifying ==
=== Seeds ===
1. (Croatia) Antonia Ružić (qualified)
2. (New Zealand) Lulu Sun (qualified)
3. (Spain) Cristina Bucșa (qualified)
4. (France) Léolia Jeanjean (qualified)
5. (France) Diane Parry (qualifying competition)
6. (Canada) Kayla Cross (qualifying competition)
7. (United States) Elvina Kalieva (qualifying competition)
8. (Japan) Mei Yamaguchi (first round)

=== Qualifiers ===
1. (Croatia) Antonia Ružić
2. (New Zealand) Lulu Sun
3. (Spain) Cristina Bucșa
4. (France) Léolia Jeanjean

=== Qualifying draw ===
==== First qualifier ====
First round
1	(Croatia) Antonia Ružić	6	6
WC	(Canada) Bianca Fernandez	3	1
(China) You Xiaodi	6	6
8	(Japan) Mei Yamaguchi	3	0

Qualifying competition
1	(Croatia) Antonia Ružić	6	6
(China) You Xiaodi	0	4

==== Second qualifier ====
First round
2	(New Zealand) Lulu Sun	6	7^{7}
(United States) Lea Ma	3	6^{2}
(France) Amandine Hesse	2	4
5	(France) Diane Parry	6	6

Qualifying competition
2	(New Zealand) Lulu Sun	6	7^{7}
5	(France) Diane Parry	4	6^{5}

==== Third qualifier ====
First round
3	(Spain) Cristina Bucșa	6	6
(Bulgaria) Lia Karatantcheva	2	1
WC	(Mexico) Julia García Ruiz	3	3
6	(Canada) Kayla Cross	6	6

Qualifying competition
3	(Spain) Cristina Bucșa	6	6
6	(Canada) Kayla Cross	1	4

==== Fourth qualifier ====
First round
4	(France) Léolia Jeanjean	6	6
(Czech Republic) Anna Sisková	4	0
(Italy) Nicole Fossa Huergo	3	2
7	(United States) Elvina Kalieva	6	6

Qualifying competition
4	(France) Léolia Jeanjean	6	6
7	(United States) Elvina Kalieva	2	3
