= 2023 Monterrey Open =

- Date: 27 February – 5 March
- Edition: 15th
- Category: WTA 250
- Draw: 32S / 16D
- Prize money: $259,303
- Surface: Hard
- Location: Monterrey, Mexico
- Venue: Club Sonoma

Champions

Singles
- (Croatia) Donna Vekić

Doubles
- (Colombia) Yuliana Lizarazo / (Colombia) María Paulina Pérez
- Monterrey Open

The 2023 Monterrey Open (also known as the Abierto GNP Seguros for sponsorship reasons) was a women's tennis tournament played on outdoor hard courts. It was the 15th edition of the Monterrey Open and a WTA 250 tournament on the 2023 WTA Tour. It took place at the Club Sonoma in Monterrey, Mexico, from February 27 to March 5, 2023.

== Champions ==
=== Singles ===
- (Croatia) Donna Vekić def. (France) Caroline Garcia, 6–4, 3–6, 7–5

=== Doubles ===
- (Colombia) Yuliana Lizarazo / (Colombia) María Paulina Pérez def. (Australia) Kimberly Birrell / (Mexico) Fernanda Contreras Gómez, 6–3, 5–7, [10–5]

== Points and prize money ==
=== Point distribution ===
Event	W	F	SF	QF	Round of 16	Round of 32	Q	Q2	Q1
Singles	280	180	110	60	30	1	18	12	1
Doubles	280	180	110	60	1	—N/a	—N/a	—N/a	—N/a

=== Prize money ===
Event	W	F	SF	QF	Round of 16	Round of 32	Q2	Q1
Singles	$34,228	$20,226	$11,275	$6,418	$3,922	$2,804	$2,075	$1,340
Doubles*	$12,447	$7,000	$4,020	$2,400	$1,848	—N/a	—N/a	—N/a

_{*per team}

== Singles main draw entrants ==
=== Seeds ===
Country	Player	Ranking^{1}	Seed
FRA	Caroline Garcia	5	1
CZE	Marie Bouzková	26	2
CRO	Donna Vekić	31	3
BEL	Elise Mertens	38	4
CHN	Zhu Lin	42	5
CZE	Kateřina Siniaková	47	6
EGY	Mayar Sherif	53	7
ITA	Elisabetta Cocciaretto	54	8

- ^{1} Rankings as of February 20, 2023.

=== Other entrants ===
The following players received wildcards into the main draw:

- (Czech Republic) Marie Bouzková
- (Mexico) Fernanda Contreras Gómez
- (United States) Emma Navarro

The following player received a special exempt into the main draw:

- ~~(Sweden) Rebecca Peterson~~

The following players received entry from the qualifying draw:

- (United States) Caroline Dolehide
- (Greece) Despina Papamichail
- Kamilla Rakhimova
- (Romania) Elena-Gabriela Ruse
- (Ukraine) Lesia Tsurenko
- (United States) Sachia Vickery

=== Withdrawals ===
Before the tournament

- (Ukraine) Kateryna Baindl → replaced by (Slovenia) Kaja Juvan
- (Brazil) Beatriz Haddad Maia → replaced by (Belgium) Ysaline Bonaventure
- (Sweden) Rebecca Peterson → replaced by (Spain) Marina Bassols Ribera

=== Retirements ===
- (Colombia) Camila Osorio (adductor injury)
- (Ukraine) Lesia Tsurenko (right elbow injury)

== Doubles main draw entrants ==
=== Seeds ===
Country	Player	Country	Player	Rank^{1}	Seed
HUN	Anna Bondár	ROU	Elena-Gabriela Ruse	88	1
GBR	Alicia Barnett	GBR	Olivia Nicholls	126	2
USA	Kaitlyn Christian	USA	Sabrina Santamaria	132	3
CZE	Anastasia Dețiuc	JPN	Eri Hozumi	137	4

- Rankings as of February 20, 2023.

=== Other entrants ===
The following pairs received wildcards into the doubles main draw:

- (Australia) Kimberly Birrell / (Mexico) Fernanda Contreras Gómez
- (Mexico) Marcela Zacarías / (Mexico) Renata Zarazúa

=== Withdrawals ===
Before the tournament

- (Czech Republic) Jesika Malečková / (Czech Republic) Renata Voráčová → replaced by (Czech Republic) Jesika Malečková / (Greece) Despina Papamichail

During the tournament

- (Hungary) Anna Bondár / (Romania) Elena-Gabriela Ruse (Ruse – left thigh injury)
