= Guo Hanyu =

Chinese tennis player (born 1998)

Guo Hanyu 郭涵煜
- Guo at the 2026 Wimbledon Championships
- Country (sports): China
- Born: 18 May 1998 (age 28) Zhengzhou, Henan
- Height: 1.70 m (5 ft 7 in)
- Plays: Right-handed (two-handed backhand)
- Coach: Robert Cokan
- Prize money: US$ 1,709,284

Singles
- Career record: 243–149
- Career titles: 6 ITF
- Highest ranking: No. 156 (23 February 2026)
- Current ranking: No. 213 (2 November 2026)

Grand Slam singles results
- Australian Open: Q1 (2026)
- French Open: 1R (2026)
- Wimbledon: Q1 (2026)
- US Open: Q1 (2026)

Doubles
- Career record: 218–120
- Career titles: 7
- Highest ranking: No. 9 (13 July 2026)
- Current ranking: No. 15 (12 October 2026)

Grand Slam doubles results
- Australian Open: 3R (2024, 2025, 2026)
- French Open: QF (2026)
- Wimbledon: W (2026)
- US Open: 2R (2025)

Other doubles tournaments
- Tour Finals: SF (2026)

Grand Slam mixed doubles results
- Wimbledon: 1R (2026)
Medal record
Women's tennis
Representing China
World University Games
| Gold medal – first place | 2021 Chengdu | Singles |
| Silver medal – second place | 2021 Chengdu | Doubles |
| Silver medal – second place | 2021 Chengdu | Team |
- Last updated on: 18 October 2026.

Guo Hanyu (Chinese: 郭涵煜; pinyin: Guō Hányù; Mandarin pronunciation: [kwó xǎn ŷ]; born 18 May 1998) is a Chinese professional tennis player. She has a career-high doubles ranking of world No. 9, achieved in July 2026, and a singles ranking of No. 156, reached in February 2026. Guo is the 2026 Wimbledon champion in doubles. She has won an additional six WTA Tour doubles titles.

She has also won six titles in singles and 12 in doubles on the ITF Women's Circuit.

== Career ==
=== 2017-19: Tour doubles debut and first WTA 125 titles ===
Partnering Ye Qiuyu, Guo made her WTA Tour main-draw debut at the 2017 Tianjin Open.

=== 2023: WTA 250 title and 1000 debut ===
Guo won her first WTA Tour title at the Guangzhou Open with Jiang Xinyu. She also reached the final of the 2023 Ningbo Open with Jiang Xinyu.

She received a wildcard for the WTA 1000 China Open in doubles with Jiang. She received a wildcard for the WTA 500 Zhengzhou Open in singles. At the same tournament, she received a wildcard into the doubles event with Jiang. She received another wildcard for the Jiangxi Open. At the same tournament, she reached the semifinals in doubles with Jiang.

=== 2024: Major and top 50 doubles debuts, WTA 500 title ===
Following a fourth final at the Thailand Open in Hia Hin, partnering with Jiang Xinyu, and a first third-round showing on her Grand Slam debut, at the Australian Open, she a new career-high on 4 March 2024 at No. 35.

In August, Guo won the WTA 500 Monterrey Open doubles title with Monica Niculescu beating Giuliana Olmos and Alexandra Panova in the final. Partnering Moyuka Uchijima, she won her third WTA Tour doubles title at the 2024 Jiangxi Open, defeating Katarzyna Piter and Fanny Stollár in the final.

=== 2025: Tour singles debut and win, WTA 500 doubles titles, top 20 ===
Partnering with Alexandra Panova, Guo won the WTA 500 doubles title at the Adelaide International, defeating Beatriz Haddad Maia and Laura Siegemund in the final. They were also champions at the WTA 500 Bad Homburg Open.

She qualified to make her WTA Tour main-draw singles debut at the Canadian Open, losing in the second round to Iga Świątek.

Playing with Alexandra Panova, she was a finalist at the Cincinnati Open, losing Gabriela Dabrowski and Erin Routliffe. As a result, she reached the top 20 in the WTA doubles rankings on 18 August 2025.

=== 2026: French Open singles debut, Wimbledon champion, top 10 ===
At the 2026 Wimbledon Championships, Guo won her first major title with Kristina Mladenovic, defeating Gabriela Dabrowski and Luisa Stefani. As a result, she reached the top 10 in the doubles rankings on 13 July 2026 at world No. 9.

== Performance timelines ==
Key
| W | F | SF | QF | #R | RR | Q# | P# | DNQ | A | Z# | PO | G | S | B | NMS | NTI | P | NH |

(W) winner; (F) finalist; (SF) semifinalist; (QF) quarterfinalist; (#R) rounds 4, 3, 2, 1; (RR) round-robin stage; (Q#) qualification round; (P#) preliminary round; (DNQ) did not qualify; (A) absent; (Z#) Davis/Fed Cup Zonal Group (with number indication) or (PO) play-off; (G) gold, (S) silver or (B) bronze Olympic/Paralympic medal; (NMS) not a Masters tournament; (NTI) not a Tier I tournament; (P) postponed; (NH) not held; (SR) strike rate (events won / competed); (W–L) win–loss record.
To avoid confusion and double counting, these charts are updated at the conclusion of a tournament or when the player's participation has ended.

=== Doubles ===
Current through the 2026 Wuhan Open.

| Tournament | 2023 | 2024 | 2025 | 2026 | SR | W–L |
|---|---|---|---|---|---|---|
Grand Slam tournaments
| Australian Open | A | 3R | 3R | 3R | 0 / 3 | 6–3 |
| French Open | A | 1R | 1R | QF | 0 / 3 | 3–3 |
| Wimbledon | A | 1R | 2R | W | 1 / 3 | 7–2 |
| US Open | A | 1R | 2R | 1R | 0 / 3 | 1–3 |
| Win–Loss | 0–0 | 2–4 | 4–4 | 11–3 | 1 / 12 | 17–11 |
Year-end championships
| WTA Finals | DNQ | | Alt | Q | 0 / 0 | 0–0 |
WTA 1000 tournaments
| Qatar Open | NTI | QF | A | A | 0 / 1 | 2–1 |
| Dubai Championships | A | 2R | A | A | 0 / 1 | 1–1 |
| Indian Wells Open | A | 2R | A | QF | 0 / 2 | 3–2 |
| Miami Open | A | 1R | A | A | 0 / 1 | 0–1 |
| Madrid Open | A | 1R | A | A | 0 / 1 | 0–1 |
| Italian Open | A | 1R | A | A | 0 / 1 | 0–1 |
| Canadian Open | A | 2R | QF | 1R | 0 / 3 | 3–3 |
| Cincinnati Open | A | 1R | F | QF | 0 / 3 | 5–3 |
| China Open | 2R | 1R | 1R | A | 0 / 3 | 1–3 |
| Wuhan Open | NH | 2R | A | 2R (Note: Withdrew during the tournament. Not counted as a loss.) | 0 / 2 | 2–1 |
| Win–Loss | 1–1 | 6–10 | 5–3 | 5–3 | 0 / 17 | 17–17 |

== Grand Slam tournament finals ==
=== Doubles: 1 (title) ===
| Result | Year | Tournament | Surface | Partner | Opponents | Score |
|---|---|---|---|---|---|---|
| Win | 2026 | Wimbledon | Grass | (France) Kristina Mladenovic | (Canada) Gabriela Dabrowski (Brazil) Luisa Stefani | 6–3, 7–5 |

== WTA 1000 finals ==
=== Doubles: 1 (runner-up) ===
| Result | Year | Tournament | Surface | Partner | Opponents | Score |
|---|---|---|---|---|---|---|
| Loss | 2025 | Cincinnati Open | Hard | Alexandra Panova | (Canada) Gabriela Dabrowski (New Zealand) Erin Routliffe | 4–6, 3–6 |

== WTA Tour finals ==
=== Doubles: 13 (7 titles, 6 runner-ups) ===
| Legend Grand Slam (1–0) WTA 1000 (0–1) WTA 500 (3–2) WTA 250 (3–3) | Finals by surface Hard (5–5) Clay (0–1) Grass (2–0) |

| Result | W–L | Date | Tournament | Tier | Surface | Partner | Opponent | Score |
|---|---|---|---|---|---|---|---|---|
| Win | 1–0 | Sep 2023 | Guangzhou Open, China | WTA 250 | Hard | (China) Jiang Xinyu | (Japan) Eri Hozumi (Japan) Makoto Ninomiya | 6–3, 7–6^{(7–4)} |
| Loss | 1–1 | Sep 2023 | Ningbo Open, China | WTA 250 | Hard | (China) Jiang Xinyu | Vera Zvonareva (Germany) Laura Siegemund | 6–4, 3–6, [5–10] |
| Loss | 1–2 | Jan 2024 | Hobart International, Australia | WTA 250 | Hard | (China) Jiang Xinyu | (Chinese Taipei) Chan Hao-ching (Mexico) Giuliana Olmos | 3–6, 3–6 |
| Loss | 1–3 | Feb 2024 | Hua Hin Championships, Thailand | WTA 250 | Hard | (China) Jiang Xinyu | (Japan) Miyu Kato (Indonesia) Aldila Sutjiadi | 4–6, 6–1, [7–10] |
| Win | 2–3 | Aug 2024 | Monterrey Open, Mexico | WTA 500 | Hard | (Romania) Monica Niculescu | Alexandra Panova (Mexico) Giuliana Olmos | 3–6, 6–3, [10-4] |
| Win | 3–3 | Oct 2024 | Jiangxi International, China | WTA 250 | Hard | (Japan) Moyuka Uchijima | (Poland) Katarzyna Piter (Hungary) Fanny Stollár | 7–6^{(7–5)}, 7–5 |
| Win | 4–3 | Jan 2025 | Adelaide International, Australia | WTA 500 | Hard | Alexandra Panova | (Brazil) Beatriz Haddad Maia (Germany) Laura Siegemund | 7–5, 6–4 |
| Loss | 4–4 | May 2025 | Strasbourg International, France | WTA 500 | Clay | (United States) Nicole Melichar-Martinez | (Brazil) Luisa Stefani (Hungary) Tímea Babos | 3–6, 7–6^{(7–4)}, [7–10] |
| Win | 5–4 | Jun 2025 | Bad Homburg Open, Germany | WTA 500 | Grass | Alexandra Panova | (Ukraine) Lyudmyla Kichenok (Australia) Ellen Perez | 4−6, 7−6^{(7−4)}, [10−5] |
| Loss | 5–5 | Aug 2025 | Cincinnati Open, United States | WTA 1000 | Hard | Alexandra Panova | (Canada) Gabriela Dabrowski (New Zealand) Erin Routliffe | 4–6, 3–6 |
| Loss | 5–6 | Aug 2025 | Monterrey Open, Mexico | WTA 500 | Hard | Alexandra Panova | (Spain) Cristina Bucșa (United States) Nicole Melichar-Martinez | 2–6, 0–6 |
| Win | 6–6 | Jan 2026 | Auckland Open, New Zealand | WTA 250 | Hard | (France) Kristina Mladenovic | (China) Xu Yifan (China) Yang Zhaoxuan | 7–6^{(9–7)}, 6–1 |
| Win | 7–6 | Jul 2026 | Wimbledon, UK | Grand Slam | Grass | (France) Kristina Mladenovic | (Canada) Gabriela Dabrowski (Brazil) Luisa Stefani | 6–3, 7–5 |

== WTA 125 finals ==
=== Singles: 1 (runner-up) ===
| Result | W–L | Date | Tournament | Surface | Opponent | Score |
|---|---|---|---|---|---|---|
| Loss | 0–1 | Feb 2026 | Midland Tennis Classic, United States | Hard (i) | Alina Charaeva | 4–6, 6–7^{(4–7)} |

=== Doubles: 2 (2 runner-ups) ===
| Result | W–L | Date | Tournament | Surface | Partner | Opponents | Score |
|---|---|---|---|---|---|---|---|
| Loss | 0–1 | Sep 2017 | Dalian Open, China | Hard | (China) Ye Qiuyu | (China) Lu Jingjing (China) You Xiaodi | 6–7^{(2)}, 6–4, [5–10] |
| Loss | 0–2 | May 2018 | Kunming Open, China | Clay | (China) Sun Xuliu | (Slovenia) Dalila Jakupović (Russia) Irina Khromacheva | 1–6, 1–6 |

== ITF Circuit finals ==
=== Singles: 14 (6 titles, 8 runner-ups) ===
Legend
$60,000 tournaments (0–1)
$50,000 tournaments (1–2)
$25,000 tournaments (3–2)
$10/15,000 tournaments (2–3)

| Result | W–L | Date | Tournament | Tier | Surface | Opponent | Score |
|---|---|---|---|---|---|---|---|
| Loss | 0–1 | Sep 2016 | ITF Guiyang, China | 25k | Hard | (Uzbekistan) Sabina Sharipova | 7–6^{(1)}, 6–7^{(0)}, 4–6 |
| Win | 1–1 | Oct 2016 | ITF Hua Hin, Thailand | 10k | Hard | (India) Karman Thandi | 6–3, 6–3 |
| Loss | 1–2 | Feb 2017 | ITF Nanjing, China | 15k | Hard | (Italy) Cristiana Ferrando | 0–6, 2–6 |
| Loss | 1–3 | Oct 2017 | Suzhou Ladies Open, China | 60k | Hard | (Italy) Sara Errani | 1–6, 0–6 |
| Loss | 1–4 | Mar 2017 | ITF Nanchang, China | 15k | Clay (i) | (China) Lu Jiaxi | 6–7^{(4)}, 3–6 |
| Win | 2–4 | Jun 2019 | ITF Luzhou, China | W25 | Hard | (China) Xun Fangying | 6–2, 6–1 |
| Win | 3–4 | Feb 2023 | ITF Kuala Lumpur, Malaysia | W15 | Hard | (Japan) Ayumi Koshiishi | 6–4, 6–3 |
| Loss | 3–5 | Mar 2023 | ITF Kuching, Malaysia | W15 | Hard | (Japan) Ayumi Koshiishi | 7–5, 2–6, 1–6 |
| Win | 4–5 | Sep 2023 | ITF Guiyang, China | W25 | Hard | (China) Liu Fangzhou | 7–5, 2–6, 6–4 |
| Loss | 4–6 | Sep 2024 | ITF Fuzhou, China | W50 | Hard | Daria Kudashova | 1–6, 1–6 |
| Win | 5–6 | Oct 2024 | ITF Qiandaohu, China | W35 | Hard | (China) Wang Meiling | 6–2, 6–2 |
| Loss | 5–7 | Feb 2025 | Burnie International, Australia | W35 | Hard | (France) Tessah Andrianjafitrimo | 2–6, 3–6 |
| Win | 6–7 | Mar 2025 | ITF Shenzhen, China | W50 | Hard | (China) You Xiaodi | 6–4, 7–5 |
| Loss | 6–8 | Mar 2026 | ITF Maanshan, China | W50 | Hard | (China) Wang Xiyu | 2–6, 6–7^{(3)} |

=== Doubles: 24 (12 titles, 12 runner-ups) ===
Legend
$100,000 tournaments (2–0)
$50/60,000 tournaments (0–2)
$40,000 tournaments (1–0)
$25,000 tournaments (5–6)
$10/15,000 tournaments (4–4)

| Result | W–L | Date | Tournament | Tier | Surface | Partner | Opponents | Score |
|---|---|---|---|---|---|---|---|---|
| Win | 1–0 | Jun 2016 | ITF Anning, China | 10k | Clay | (China) Lu Jiaxi | (China) Sheng Yuqi (China) Xin Yuan | 6–3, 6–4 |
| Loss | 1–1 | Sep 2016 | Zhuhai Open, China | 50k | Hard | (China) Jiang Xinyu | (India) Ankita Raina (United Kingdom) Emily Webley-Smith | 4–6, 4–6 |
| Loss | 1–2 | Oct 2016 | ITF Hua Hin, Thailand | 10k | Hard | (China) Lu Jiaxi | (China) Zhang Yukun (Thailand) Nudnida Luangnam | 2–6, 3–6 |
| Loss | 1–3 | Feb 2017 | ITF Nanjing, China | 15k | Hard | (China) Tang Haochen | (China) Li Yihong (China) Zhang Ying | 7–5, 3–6, [3–10] |
| Loss | 1–4 | Apr 2017 | ITF Nanjing, China | 25k | Hard | (China) Gai Ao | (China) Lu Jingjing (Russia) Valeria Savinykh | 4–6, 4–6 |
| Win | 2–4 | Jan 2018 | ITF Orlando, United States | 25k | Clay | (Chinese Taipei) Hsu Ching-wen | (Norway) Ulrikke Eikeri (Belarus) Ilona Kremen | 6–3, 3–6, [12–10] |
| Loss | 2–5 | Apr 2018 | Industrial Bank Cup, China | 60k | Hard | (China) Wang Xinyu | (China) Han Xinyun (China) Ye Qiuyu | 6–7^{(3)}, 6–7^{(6)} |
| Loss | 2–6 | May 2018 | ITF Wuhan, China | 25k | Hard | (China) Zhang Ying | (Japan) Mai Minokoshi (Japan) Erika Sema | 4–6, 1–6 |
| Loss | 2–7 | Jul 2018 | ITF Nonthaburi, Thailand | 25k | Hard | (Thailand) Peangtarn Plipuech | (Japan) Robu Kajitani (Chinese Taipei) Lee Pei-chi | 4–6, 2–6 |
| Loss | 2–8 | Oct 2018 | ITF Nanning, China | 25k | Hard | (China) Feng Shuo | (South Korea) Kim Na-ri (China) Ye Qiuyu | 3–6, 0–6 |
| Win | 3–8 | Mar 2019 | ITF Nanchang, China | W15 | Clay (i) | (China) Zheng Wushuang | (China) Ma Yexin (Japan) Mei Yamaguchi | 6–0, 6–1 |
| Loss | 3–9 | Mar 2019 | ITF Nanchang, China | W15 | Clay (i) | (China) Tang Qianhui | (China) Cao Siqi (China) Guo Meiqi | 4–6, 6–4, [8–10] |
| Loss | 3–10 | Jun 2019 | ITF Luzhou, China | W25 | Hard | (China) Ye Qiuyu | (China) Feng Shuo (China) Xun Fangying | 3–6, 1–6 |
| Win | 4–10 | Jun 2019 | ITF Shenzhen, China | W25 | Hard | (China) Ye Qiuyu | (China) Chen Jiahui (China) Wu Meixu | 1–6, 7–6^{(4)}, [11–9] |
| Loss | 4–11 | Feb 2023 | ITF Ipoh, Malaysia | W15 | Hard | (China) Feng Shuo | (Chinese Taipei) Li Yu-yun (Ukraine) Anastasiia Poplavska | 5–7, 2–6 |
| Win | 5–11 | Feb 2023 | ITF Kuala Lumpur, Malaysia | W15 | Hard | (Chinese Taipei) Li Yu-yun | (Thailand) Anchisa Chanta (Japan) Ayaka Okuno | 6–0, 2–6, [10–2] |
| Win | 6–11 | Mar 2023 | ITF Kuching, Malaysia | W15 | Hard | (Chinese Taipei) Li Yu-yun | (China) Feng Shuo (China) Guo Meiqi | 6–2, 6–3 |
| Win | 7–11 | Apr 2023 | ITF Jakarta, Indonesia | W25 | Hard | (Hong Kong) Cody Wong | (South Korea) Choi Ji-hee (South Korea) Park So-hyun | 6–2, 7–6^{(6)} |
| Loss | 7–12 | May 2023 | ITF Goyang, Korea | W25 | Hard | (China) Tang Qianhui | (Thailand) Luksika Kumkhum (Thailand) Punnin Kovapitukted | 3–6, 6–1, [6–10] |
| Win | 8–12 | Jun 2023 | ITF Changwon, Korea | W25 | Hard | (China) Jiang Xinyu | (Chinese Taipei) Cho I-hsuan (Chinese Taipei) Cho Yi-tsen | 7–6^{(4)}, 7–6^{(1)} |
| Win | 9–12 | Aug 2023 | Kunming Open, China | W40 | Clay | (China) Jiang Xinyu | (Kazakhstan) Zhibek Kulambayeva (Thailand) Lanlana Tararudee | 6–2, 6–0 |
| Win | 10–12 | Sep 2023 | ITF Guiyang, China | W25 | Hard | (China) Jiang Xinyu | (Chinese Taipei) Cho I-hsuan (Chinese Taipei) Cho Yi-tsen | 7–5, 6–4 |
| Win | 11–12 | Nov 2023 | Takasaki Open, Japan | W100 | Hard | (China) Jiang Xinyu | (Japan) Momoko Kobori (Japan) Ayano Shimizu | 7–6^{(5)}, 5–7, [10–5] |
| Win | 12–12 | Apr 2025 | Tokyo Open, Japan | W100 | Hard | (Japan) Ena Shibahara | (Thailand) Mananchaya Sawangkaew (Thailand) Lanlana Tararudee | 5–7, 7–6^{(1)}, [10–5] |
