= Ana Karen Guadiana Campos =

Mexican tennis player (born 2002)

- Full name: Ana Karen Guadiana Campos
- Country (sports): Mexico
- Born: 22 January 2002 (age 23) Monterrey, Mexico
- College: Northern Arizona; Western Michigan
- Prize money: US $17,674

Singles
- Career record: 9–25
- Highest ranking: No. 691 (8 April 2019)
- Current ranking: No. 1129 (3 February 2025)

Doubles
- Career record: 4–12
- Highest ranking: No. 787 (5 May 2025)
- Current ranking: No. 932 (3 February 2025)
- Last updated on: 3 February 2025.

Ana Karen Guadiana Campos (born 22 January 2002) is a Mexican professional tennis player. She has a career-high ranking of No. 691 in singles, achieved on 8 April 2019.

== Early life ==
Guadiana Campos was born in Monterrey to Miguel Ángel Guadiana and Silvia Raquel Campos. She attended Prepa Tec. She began playing tennis at the age of three. She trained for a time at the SotoTennis Academy in Sotogrande, Spain.

== College and professional career ==
In April 2019, she received a wildcard into the qualifying draw of the Monterrey Open, but failed to advance to the main draw. In 2020, she received a scholarship to play collegiate tennis at Western Michigan University. She later transferred to Northern Arizona University.

In August 2024, she and compatriot Julia García Ruiz received a wildcard into the doubles main draw of the Monterrey Open.
