= Julia García Ruiz =

Mexican tennis player (born 2003)

- Country (sports): Mexico
- Born: 5 August 2003 (age 23) Morelia, Mexico
- Plays: Left (two-handed backhand)
- College: Oklahoma
- Prize money: $46,698

Singles
- Career record: 33–26
- Highest ranking: No. 763 (21 July 2025)
- Current ranking: No. 1,060 (28 September 2026)

Doubles
- Career record: 28–17
- Career titles: 4 ITF
- Highest ranking: No. 691 (8 June 2026)
- Current ranking: No. 851 (28 September 2026)
- Last updated on: 29 September 2026.

Julia García Ruiz (born 5 August 2003) is a Mexican professional tennis player. She has career-high rankings of No. 763 in singles, achieved on 21 July 2025, and No. 691 in doubles, achieved on 8 June 2026. She played collegiate tennis at the University of Oklahoma.

== Early life ==
García Ruiz is a native of Morelia. She began playing tennis at the age of four. In her youth, she represented the Club Deportivo Futurama in Aguascalientes before moving to the Academia Tenis Conade in Acapulco.

== Collegiate years ==
In 2022, she began playing collegiate tennis for the Oklahoma Sooners. She was twice named a Big 12 Tennis Player of the Week in 2024.

== Professional ==
In August 2024, she made her WTA Tour debut with a wildcard into the doubles main draw of the Monterrey Open with compatriot Ana Karen Guadiana Campos. She also received a wildcard into the singles qualifying competition where she defeated Natalija Stevanović.

== ITF Circuit finals ==
=== Doubles: 6 (4 titles, 2 runner-ups) ===
| Legend W35 tournaments (2–1) W15 tournaments (2–1) | Finals by surface Hard (4–2) |

| Result | W–L | Date | Tournament | Tier | Surface | Partner | Opponent | Score |
|---|---|---|---|---|---|---|---|---|
| Win | 1–0 | Jun 2024 | ITF Santo Domingo, Dominican Republic | W35 | Hard | (Dominican Republic) Ana Carmen Zamburek | (Ecuador) Mell Reasco (Germany) Antonia Schmidt | 6–4, 2–6, [10–4] |
| Win | 2–0 | Jun 2024 | ITF Santo Domingo, Dominican Republic | W15 | Hard | (United States) Sofía Camila Rojas | (Mexico) Jessica Hinojosa Gómez (Bolivia) Noelia Zeballos | 6–4, 7–6^{(6)} |
| Win | 3–0 | Jun 2025 | ITF Wichita, United States | W35 | Hard | (Spain) Maria Berlanga Bandera | (United States) Catherine Harrison (United States) Christina Rosca | 7–5, 7–5 |
| Loss | 3–1 | Oct 2025 | ITF Norman, United States | W35 | Hard | (Spain) Maria Berlanga Bandera | (United States) Savannah Broadus (Netherlands) Rose Marie Nijkamp | 2–6, 3–6 |
| Win | 4–1 | Aug 2026 | ITF Logroño, Spain | W15 | Hard | (United States) Jenna DeFalco | (Spain) Olga Bienzobas Fernandez (Estonia) Anet Koskel | 2–6, 6–4, [11–9] |
| Loss | 4–2 | Aug 2026 | ITF Torelló, Spain | W15 | Hard | (Spain) Ariadna Garcia-Patrón Canals | (Spain) Aliona Bolsova (Spain) Celia Cerviño Ruiz | 2–6, 2–6 |
