= 2019 Monterrey Open =

- Date: 1–7 April
- Edition: 11th
- Category: WTA International
- Draw: 32S / 16D
- Prize money: $250,000
- Surface: Hard
- Location: Monterrey, Mexico

Champions

Singles
- (Spain) Garbiñe Muguruza

Doubles
- (United States) Asia Muhammad / (United States) Maria Sanchez
| ← 2018 · | Monterrey Open | · 2020 → |

The 2019 Monterrey Open, also known as the 2019 Abierto GNP Seguros for sponsorship reasons, was a women's tennis tournament played on outdoor hard courts. It was the 11th edition of the Monterrey Open and an International tournament on the 2019 WTA Tour. It took place at the Club Sonoma in Monterrey, Mexico, from 1 April until 7 April 2019. Second-seeded Garbiñe Muguruza won her second consecutive singles title at the event.

== Finals ==
=== Singles ===
(Spain) Garbiñe Muguruza defeated (Belarus) Victoria Azarenka, 6–1, 3–1, ret.

- It was Muguruza's only singles title of the year and the 7th of her career.

=== Doubles ===
(United States) Asia Muhammad / (United States) Maria Sanchez defeated (Australia) Monique Adamczak / (Australia) Jessica Moore, 7–6^{(7–2)}, 6–4

== Points and prize money ==
=== Point distribution ===
| Event | W | F | SF | QF | Round of 16 | Round of 32 | Q | Q3 | Q2 | Q1 |
| Singles | 280 | 180 | 110 | 60 | 30 | 1 | 18 | 14 | 10 | 1 |
| Doubles | 280 | 180 | 110 | 60 | 1 | — | — | — | — | — |

=== Prize money ===
| Event | W | F | SF | QF | Round of 16 | Round of 32 | Q3 | Q2 | Q1 |
| Singles | $43,000 | $21,400 | $11,300 | $5,900 | $3,310 | $1,925 | $1,005 | $730 | $530 |
| Doubles | $12,300 | $6,400 | $3,435 | $1,820 | $960 | — | — | — | — |
Doubles prize money per team

== Singles main draw entrants ==
=== Seeds ===
| Country | Player | Ranking^{1} | Seed |
|---|---|---|---|
| GER | Angelique Kerber | 4 | 1 |
| ESP | Garbiñe Muguruza | 17 | 2 |
| RUS | Anastasia Pavlyuchenkova | 33 | 3 |
| USA | Alison Riske | 45 | 4 |
| BLR | Victoria Azarenka | 46 | 5 |
| BEL | Kirsten Flipkens | 56 | 6 |
| FRA | Kristina Mladenovic | 68 | 7 |
| SVK | Magdaléna Rybáriková | 73 | 8 |

- ^{1} Rankings as of 18 March 2019.

=== Other entrants ===
The following players received wildcards into the main draw:

- (Mexico) Giuliana Olmos
- (Mexico) Victoria Rodríguez
- (Mexico) Renata Zarazúa

The following players received entry from the qualifying draw:

- (Brazil) Beatriz Haddad Maia
- (Japan) Miyu Kato
- (Slovakia) Kristína Kučová
- (China) Xu Shilin

The following players received entry as lucky losers:

- (Hungary) Gréta Arn
- (Romania) Elena-Gabriela Ruse

=== Withdrawals ===
Before the tournament

- (Canada) Eugenie Bouchard → replaced by (United Kingdom) Harriet Dart
- (United Kingdom) Katie Boulter → replaced by (Hungary) Gréta Arn
- (Croatia) Donna Vekić → replaced by (Serbia) Olga Danilović
- (China) Wang Yafan → replaced by (Serbia) Ivana Jorović
- (Ukraine) Dayana Yastremska → replaced by (Japan) Misaki Doi
- (Russia) Vera Zvonareva → replaced by (Romania) Elena-Gabriela Ruse

=== Retirements ===
- (Belarus) Victoria Azarenka (right lower leg injury)

== Doubles main draw entrants ==
=== Seeds ===
| Country | Player | Country | Player | Rank^{1} | Seed |
|---|---|---|---|---|---|
| JPN | Miyu Kato | JPN | Makoto Ninomiya | 75 | 1 |
| ESP | Lara Arruabarrena | SLO | Dalila Jakupović | 82 | 2 |
| USA | Asia Muhammad | USA | Maria Sanchez | 119 | 3 |
| JPN | Nao Hibino | USA | Desirae Krawczyk | 120 | 4 |

- Rankings as of April 1, 2019.

=== Other entrants ===
The following pairs received wildcards into the doubles main draw:

- (Serbia) Jovana Jakšić / (Mexico) Renata Zarazúa
- (Mexico) Victoria Rodríguez / (Mexico) Ana Sofía Sánchez

=== Withdrawals ===
- (United States) Christina McHale (right finger injury)
