= 2020 Monterrey Open – Doubles =

Doubles
- 2020 Monterrey Open

Final
- Champions: (Ukraine) Kateryna Bondarenko (Canada) Sharon Fichman
- Runners-up: (Japan) Miyu Kato (China) Wang Yafan
- Score: 4–6, 6–3, [10–7]

Details
- Draw: 16
- Seeds: 4

Events
Singles	Doubles
← 2019 ·	Monterrey Open	· 2021 →

Asia Muhammad and Maria Sanchez were the defending champions, but Muhammad chose to compete in the Indian Wells 125K event instead. Sanchez played alongside Monique Adamczak, but lost in the first round to Marie Bouzková and Renata Voráčová.

Kateryna Bondarenko and Sharon Fichman won the title, defeating Miyu Kato and Wang Yafan in the final, 4–6, 6–3, [10–7].

== Seeds ==
1. (Spain) Georgina García Pérez / (Spain) Sara Sorribes Tormo (quarterfinals)
2. (United States) Desirae Krawczyk / (Mexico) Giuliana Olmos (quarterfinals)
3. (Australia) Ellen Perez / (Australia) Storm Sanders (semifinals)
4. (Australia) Monique Adamczak / (United States) Maria Sanchez (first round)

== Draw ==
=== Key ===
- Q = Qualifier
- WC = Wild card
- LL = Lucky loser
- Alt = Alternate
- SE = Special exempt
- PR = Protected ranking
- ITF = ITF entry
- JE = Junior exempt
- w/o = Walkover
- r = Retired
- d = Defaulted
- SR = Special ranking

=== Draw ===
First round
1	(Spain) G García Pérez (Spain) S Sorribes Tormo	6	7
(Spain) L Arruabarrena (United States) L Davis	2	5
(Sweden) C Lister (Russia) Y Sizikova	4	4
(Japan) M Kato (China) Y Wang	6	6
3	(Australia) E Perez (Australia) S Sanders	7	6
(United States) K Christian (Slovenia) D Jakupović	5	2
WC	(Italy) E Cocciaretto (Mexico) R Zarazúa	6	4	[7]
(United States) I Neel (United States) S Santamaria	4	6	[10]
WC	(Italy) S Errani (Chile) D Seguel	6^{5}	3
(United Kingdom) J Konta (Ukraine) E Svitolina	7^{7}	6
(Czech Republic) M Bouzková (Czech Republic) R Voráčová	6	3	[10]
4	(Australia) M Adamczak (United States) M Sanchez	3	6	[5]
PR	(Ukraine) K Bondarenko (Canada) S Fichman	7	6
(Netherlands) A Rus (Slovenia) T Zidanšek	5	4
(United States) C Dolehide (Australia) A Sharma	6^{9}	7	[9]
2	(United States) D Krawczyk (Mexico) G Olmos	7^{11}	5	[11]

Quarterfinals
1	(Spain) G García Pérez (Spain) S Sorribes Tormo	7^{7}	4	[8]
(Japan) M Kato (China) Y Wang	6^{1}	6	[10]
3	(Australia) E Perez (Australia) S Sanders	6	6
(United States) I Neel (United States) S Santamaria	4	4
(United Kingdom) J Konta (Ukraine) E Svitolina
(Czech Republic) M Bouzková (Czech Republic) R Voráčová	w/o
PR	(Ukraine) K Bondarenko (Canada) S Fichman	6	6
2	(United States) D Krawczyk (Mexico) G Olmos	4	4

Semifinals
(Japan) M Kato (China) Y Wang	6^{3}	6	[10]
3	(Australia) E Perez (Australia) S Sanders	7^{7}	4	[8]
(Czech Republic) M Bouzková (Czech Republic) R Voráčová	4	6	[11]
PR	(Ukraine) K Bondarenko (Canada) S Fichman	6	0	[13]

Final
(Japan) M Kato (China) Y Wang	6	3	[7]
PR	(Ukraine) K Bondarenko (Canada) S Fichman	4	6	[10]
