= 2018 Monterrey Open =

- Date: 2–8 April
- Edition: 10th
- Category: WTA International
- Draw: 32S / 16D
- Prize money: $250,000
- Surface: Hard / outdoor
- Location: Monterrey, Mexico

Champions

Singles
- (Spain) Garbiñe Muguruza

Doubles
- (United Kingdom) Naomi Broady / (Spain) Sara Sorribes Tormo
← 2017 ·	Monterrey Open	· 2019 →

The 2018 Monterrey Open, also known as the Abierto GNP Seguros for sponsorship reasons, was a women's tennis tournament played on outdoor hard courts. It was the 10th edition of the Monterrey Open and an International tournament on the 2018 WTA Tour. It took place at the Club Sonoma in Monterrey, Mexico, from 2 April until 8 April 2018. Firsts-seeded Garbiñe Muguruza won the singles title.

== Finals ==
=== Singles ===
- (Spain) Garbiñe Muguruza defeating (Hungary) Tímea Babos, 3–6, 6–4, 6–3
- It was Muguruza's only singles title of the year and the 6th of her career.

=== Doubles ===
- (United Kingdom) Naomi Broady / (Spain) Sara Sorribes Tormo defeating (United States) Desirae Krawczyk / (Mexico) Giuliana Olmos, 3–6, 6–4, [10–8]

== Points and prize money ==
=== Point distribution ===
Event	W	F	SF	QF	Round of 16	Round of 32	Q	Q3	Q2	Q1
Singles	280	180	110	60	30	1	18	14	10	1
Doubles	280	180	110	60	1	—	—	—	—	—

=== Prize money ===
Event	W	F	SF	QF	Round of 16	Round of 32	Q3	Q2	Q1
Singles	$43,000	$11,300	$5,900	$3,310	$1,925	$1,005	$730	$530	
Doubles	$12,300	$6,400	$3,435	$1,820	$960	—	—	—	—
Doubles prize money per team

== Singles main draw entrants ==
=== Seeds ===
Country	Player	Ranking^{1}	Seed
ESP	Garbiñe Muguruza	3	1
SVK	Magdaléna Rybáriková	18	2
UKR	Lesia Tsurenko	41	3
HUN	Tímea Babos	47	4
PUR	Monica Puig	82	5
ROU	Ana Bogdan	85	6
USA	Sachia Vickery	89	7
AUS	Ajla Tomljanović	90	8

- ^{1} Rankings as of 19 March 2018.

=== Other entrants ===
The following players received wildcards into the main draw:

- (Mexico) Victoria Rodriguez
- (Mexico) Ana Sofía Sánchez
- (Mexico) Renata Zarazúa

The following players received entry from the qualifying draw:

- (United States) Usue Maitane Arconada
- (Czech Republic) Marie Bouzková
- (Greece) Valentini Grammatikopoulou
- (Slovenia) Dalila Jakupović

=== Withdrawals ===
Before the tournament

- (Germany) Sabine Lisicki → replaced by (Japan) Risa Ozaki
- (Romania) Monica Niculescu → replaced by (United States) Irina Falconi
- (Russia) Anastasia Pavlyuchenkova → replaced by (Canada) Carol Zhao

During the tournament

- (Ukraine) Lesia Tsurenko

== Doubles main draw entrants ==
=== Seeds ===
Country	Player	Country	Player	Rank^{1}	Seed
JPN	Nao Hibino	CRO	Darija Jurak	107	1
ARG	María Irigoyen	JPN	Miyu Kato	124	2
SLO	Dalila Jakupović	RUS	Irina Khromacheva	130	3
RUS	Anna Blinkova	BLR	Lidziya Marozava	178	4

- Rankings as of March 19, 2018.

=== Other entrants ===
The following pairs received wildcards into the doubles main draw:

- (Serbia) Jovana Jakšić / (Mexico) Ana Sofía Sánchez
- (Mexico) Marcela Zacarías / (Mexico) Renata Zarazúa

=== Withdrawals ===
During the tournament

- (Ukraine) Lesia Tsurenko
