= 2019 Monterrey Open – Doubles =

Doubles
- 2019 Monterrey Open

Final
- Champions: (United States) Asia Muhammad (United States) Maria Sanchez
- Runners-up: (Australia) Monique Adamczak (Australia) Jessica Moore
- Score: 7–6^{(7–2)}, 6–4

Details
- Draw: 16
- Seeds: 4

Events
Singles	Doubles
← 2018 ·	Monterrey Open	· 2020 →

Naomi Broady and Sara Sorribes Tormo were the defending champions, but Broady chose not to participate and Sorribes Tormo chose to compete in Charleston instead.

Asia Muhammad and Maria Sanchez won the title, defeating Monique Adamczak and Jessica Moore in the final, 7–6^{(7–2)}, 6–4.

== Seeds ==
1. (Japan) Miyu Kato / (Japan) Makoto Ninomiya (first round)
2. (Spain) Lara Arruabarrena / (Slovenia) Dalila Jakupović (first round)
3. (United States) Asia Muhammad / (United States) Maria Sanchez (champions)
4. (Japan) Nao Hibino / (United States) Desirae Krawczyk (first round)

== Draw ==
=== Key ===
- Q = Qualifier
- WC = Wild card
- LL = Lucky loser
- Alt = Alternate
- SE = Special exempt
- PR = Protected ranking
- ITF = ITF entry
- JE = Junior exempt
- w/o = Walkover
- r = Retired
- d = Defaulted
- SR = Special ranking

=== Draw ===
First round
1	(Japan) M Kato (Japan) M Ninomiya	6	5	[4]
(United Kingdom) H Dart (Russia) V Savinykh	1	7	[10]
(Japan) M Doi (Georgia (country)) O Kalashnikova	6^{4}	6	[7]
(Australia) M Adamczak (Australia) J Moore	7^{7}	3	[10]
4	(Japan) N Hibino (United States) D Krawczyk	6	5	[6]
(Romania) A Bogdan (Romania) E-G Ruse	0	7	[10]
(United States) D Lao (United States) C McHale
(Canada) S Fichman (New Zealand) E Routliffe	w/o
(Chile) A Guarachi (United States) S Santamaria	7^{7}	6
WC	(Serbia) J Jakšić (Mexico) R Zarazúa	6^{5}	2
WC	(Mexico) V Rodríguez (Mexico) AS Sánchez	4	1
3	(United States) A Muhammad (United States) M Sanchez	6	6
(Russia) A Blinkova (Russia) A Panova	3	6	[3]
(Poland) P Kania (Russia) Y Sizikova	6	2	[10]
(Mexico) G Olmos (Brazil) L Stefani	6	7
2	(Spain) L Arruabarrena (Slovenia) D Jakupović	3	5

Quarterfinals
(United Kingdom) H Dart (Russia) V Savinykh	3	7	[1]
(Australia) M Adamczak (Australia) J Moore	6	5	[10]
(Romania) A Bogdan (Romania) E-G Ruse	6	1	[10]
(Canada) S Fichman (New Zealand) E Routliffe	4	6	[8]
(Chile) A Guarachi (United States) S Santamaria	2	4
3	(United States) A Muhammad (United States) M Sanchez	6	6
(Poland) P Kania (Russia) Y Sizikova	1	2
(Mexico) G Olmos (Brazil) L Stefani	6	6

Semifinals
(Australia) M Adamczak (Australia) J Moore	6^{2}	6	[10]
(Romania) A Bogdan (Romania) E-G Ruse	7^{7}	3	[5]
3	(United States) A Muhammad (United States) M Sanchez	6	6
(Mexico) G Olmos (Brazil) L Stefani	4	4

Final
(Australia) M Adamczak (Australia) J Moore	6^{2}	4
3	(United States) A Muhammad (United States) M Sanchez	7^{7}	6
