= Garbiñe Muguruza career statistics =

Statistics

Career finals
Discipline	Type	Won	Lost	Total
Singles	Grand Slam	2	2	4
Singles	WTA Finals	1	0	1
Singles	WTA 1000	3	2	5
Singles	WTA 500/250	4	3	7
Singles	Olympics	–	–	–
Singles	Total	10	7	17
Doubles	Grand Slam	–	–	–
Doubles	WTA Finals	–	1	1
Doubles	WTA 1000	–	3	3
Doubles	WTA 500/250	5	1	6
Doubles	Olympics	–	–	–
Doubles	Total	5	5	10

This is a list of the main career statistics of Spanish professional tennis player, Garbiñe Muguruza. To date, she has won 15 WTA Tour-level tournaments, winning ten of them in singles and five in doubles. In her titles collection, she also has seven singles and one doubles titles on the ITF Circuit. Having good performances at the majors, she won the French Open title in 2016 and then the following year at Wimbledon. Along with that, she reached two more Grand Slam finals (2015 Wimbledon and 2020 Australian Open).

At the 2021 WTA Finals, she reached her first final there, and won the title defeating Anett Kontaveit. Muguruza reached her career-high ranking of world No. 1 on 11 September 2017. In 2015, when her breakthrough happened, she reached her first WTA 1000 final at the Wuhan Open. The following week, she won her first WTA 1000-level tournament at the China Open. Later, she won two more WTA 1000 titles; at the 2017 Cincinnati Open and the 2021 Dubai Championships.

Being more recognized for her singles results, she done well in doubles as well. Most significant results are the finals at the 2017 WTA Finals and three more from the WTA 1000 tier. She also reached semifinals at the 2014 French Open. All mentioned doubles achievements she made alongside compatriot Carla Suárez Navarro. On the 23 February 2015, she had her top 10 debut in the doubles rankings as No. 10, her highest up to date.

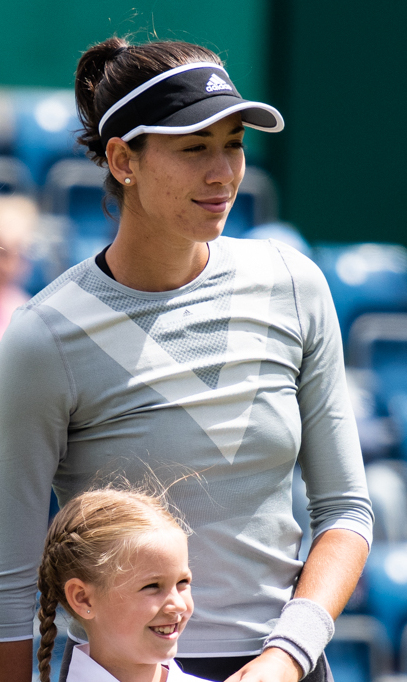
Muguruza at the 2018 Birmingham Classic.

== Performance timelines ==
Key
W	F	SF	QF	#R	RR	Q#	P#	DNQ	A	Z#	PO	G	S	B	NMS	NTI	P	NH

(W) winner; (F) finalist; (SF) semifinalist; (QF) quarterfinalist; (#R) rounds 4, 3, 2, 1; (RR) round-robin stage; (Q#) qualification round; (P#) preliminary round; (DNQ) did not qualify; (A) absent; (Z#) Davis/Fed Cup Zonal Group (with number indication) or (PO) play-off; (G) gold, (S) silver or (B) bronze Olympic/Paralympic medal; (NMS) not a Masters tournament; (NTI) not a Tier I tournament; (P) postponed; (NH) not held; (SR) strike rate (events won / competed); (W–L) win–loss record.
To avoid confusion and double counting, these charts are updated at the conclusion of a tournament or when the player's participation has ended.

Only main-draw results in WTA Tour, Grand Slam tournaments, Fed Cup/Billie Jean King Cup and Olympic Games are included in Win–loss records.

=== Singles ===
Tournament	2012	2013	2014	2015	2016	2017	2018	2019	2020	2021	2022	2023	SR	W–L	Win %
Grand Slam tournaments
Australian Open	A	2R	4R	4R	3R	QF	2R	4R	F	4R	2R	1R	0 / 11	27–11	71%
French Open	Q3	2R	QF	QF	W	4R	SF	4R	3R	1R	1R	A	1 / 10	29–9	76%
Wimbledon	Q2	2R	1R	F	2R	W	2R	1R	NH	3R	1R	A	1 / 9	18–8	69%
US Open	1R	A	1R	2R	2R	4R	2R	1R	2R	4R	3R	A	0 / 10	12–10	55%
Win–loss	0–1	3–3	7–4	14–4	11–3	17–3	8–4	6–4	9–3	8–4	3–4	0–1	2 / 40	86–38	69%
Year-end championships
WTA Finals	DNQ			SF	RR	RR	DNQ		NH	W	DNQ		1 / 4	9–6	60%
WTA Elite Trophy (Note: Formerly known as WTA Tournament of Champions until 2015.)	DNQ		SF	A	A	A	SF	DNQ	NH			DNQ	0 / 2	5–2	71%
National representation
Summer Olympics	A	NH			3R	NH				QF	NH		0 / 2	5–2	71%
Billie Jean King Cup (Note: Formerly known as Fed Cup until 2020.)	A	A	A	WG2	PO	QF	PO2	PO	A (Note: Edition was split into the two years due to COVID-19.)		A	A	0 / 1	9–3	75%
WTA 1000
Dubai / Qatar Open (Note: The first Premier 5 event of the year has switched back and forth between the Dubai Tennis Championships and the Qatar Open since 2009. Dubai was classified as a Premier 5 event from 2009 to 2011 before being succeeded by Doha for the 2012–2014 period. In 2015, Dubai regained its Premier 5 status while Doha was demoted to Premier status. The two tournaments have since alternated status every year. The Premier 5 tournaments were reclassified as WTA 1000 tournaments in 2021.)	A	A	A	SF	QF	2R	F	3R	QF	W	QF	A	1 / 8	22–7	76%
Indian Wells Open	A	4R	2R	3R	2R	QF	2R	QF	NH	2R	2R	A	0 / 9	10–9	53%
Miami Open	4R	4R	2R	3R	4R	4R	4R	2R	NH	4R	A	A	0 / 9	14–9	63%
Madrid Open	1R	Q2	2R	2R	2R	1R	3R	1R	NH	A	2R	A	0 / 8	6–8	43%
Italian Open	A	2R	2R	A	SF	SF	2R	3R	SF	3R	2R	A	0 / 9	16–9	64%
Canadian Open	A	A	2R	2R	A	QF	A	A	NH	2R	3R	A	0 / 5	4–5	44%
Cincinnati Open	Q1	A	1R	1R	SF	W	2R	1R	A	3R	2R	A	1 / 8	9–7	56%
Pan Pacific / Wuhan Open (Note: In 2014, the Pan Pacific Open was downgraded to a Premier event and replaced by the Wuhan Open. The Premier 5 tournaments were reclassified as WTA 1000 tournaments in 2021.)	Q2	A	3R	F	2R	QF	3R	2R	NH				0 / 6	11–5	69%
China Open	Q1	A	1R	W	3R	1R	2R	1R	NH			A	1 / 6	8–5	62%
Guadalajara Open	NH										A	A	0 / 0	0–0	–
Career statistics
	2012	2013	2014	2015	2016	2017	2018	2019	2020	2021	2022	2023	Career		
Tournaments	8	12	23	20	20	21	22	16	8	19	17	4	Career total: 190		
Titles	0	0	1	1	1	2	1	1	0	3	0	0	Career total: 10		
Finals	0	0	2	3	1	2	2	1	1	5	0	0	Career total: 17		
Hard win–loss	3–4	8–6	27–15	27–12	20–15	31–15	24–14	17–12	17–5	35–12	9–10	0–4	7 / 120	218–124	64%
Clay win–loss	3–3	2–4	9–4	7–4	14–3	6–4	7–4	5–3	6–2	3–3	2–4	0–0	1 / 39	64–38	63%
Grass win–loss	0–1	4–2	2–2	7–3	1–2	10–2	2–2	0–1	0–0	4–2	1–3	0–0	1 / 21	31–20	61%
Overall win–loss	6–8	14–12	38–21	41–19	35–20	47–21	33–20	22–16	23–7	42–17	12–17	0–4	10 / 190	313–182	63%
Win (%)	43%	54%	64%	68%	64%	69%	62%	58%	77%	71%	41%	0%	Career total: 63%		
Year-end ranking	104	64	21	3	7	2	18	36	15	3	55	1056	$24,813,892		

=== Doubles ===
Tournament	2013	2014	2015	2016	2017	2018	2019	2020	2021	2022	SR	W–L	Win%
Grand Slam tournaments
Australian Open	A	2R	2R	A	A	A	A	A	A	A	0 / 2	2–2	50%
French Open	1R	SF	1R	A	A	A	A	A	A	A	0 / 3	4–3	57%
Wimbledon	1R	3R	2R	A	A	A	A	NH	A	A	0 / 3	3–3	50%
US Open	A	3R	2R	A	A	A	A	A	A	A	0 / 2	3–2	60%
Win–loss	0–2	9–4	3–4	0–0	0–0	0–0	0–0	0–0	0–0	0–0	0 / 10	12–10	55%
Year-end championship
WTA Finals	DNQ	QF	F	DNQ				NH	DNQ		0 / 2	3–3	50%
National representation
Summer Olympics	NH			QF	NH				2R	NH	0 / 2	3–2	67%
Billie Jean King Cup	A	A	WG2	A	A	A	PO	A			0 / 2	1–1	50%
WTA 1000
Dubai / Qatar Open	A	A	F	A	A	A	A	A	A	A	0 / 1	4–1	80%
Indian Wells Open	A	A	2R	1R	A	A	2R	NH	A	A	0 / 3	2–2	50%
Miami Open	1R	QF	2R	A	A	A	A	NH	A	A	0 / 3	3–3	50%
Madrid Open	1R	F	F	2R	A	A	A	NH	A	A	0 / 4	8–3	73%
Italian Open	A	A	A	A	A	A	A	A	A	A	0 / 0	0–0	–
Canadian Open	A	2R	2R	A	A	A	A	NH	A	A	0 / 2	2–2	50%
Cincinnati Open	A	QF	1R	A	A	A	A	A	A	A	0 / 2	2–2	50%
Pan Pacific / Wuhan Open	A	2R	QF	A	A	A	A	NH			0 / 2	3–0	100%
China Open	A	QF	A	A	A	A	A	NH			0 / 1	1–1	50%
Guadalajara Open	NH									A	0 / 0	0–0	–
Career statistics
Tournaments	8	16	14	3	1	1	1	0	3	0	Career total: 44		
Titles	1	2	2	0	0	0	0	0	0	0	Career total: 5		
Finals	1	4	5	0	0	0	0	0	0	0	Career total: 10		
Overall win–loss	5–7	31–13	26–14	3–2	1–1	1–1	2–0	0–0	3–3	0–0	5 / 44	82–50	62%
Year-end ranking	153	16	16	387	466	493	480	505					

== Grand Slam tournament finals ==
=== Singles: 4 (2 titles, 2 runner-ups) ===
Result	Year	Championship	Surface	Opponent	Score
Loss	2015	Wimbledon	Grass	(United States) Serena Williams	4–6, 4–6
Win	2016	French Open	Clay	(United States) Serena Williams	7–5, 6–4
Win	2017	Wimbledon	Grass	(United States) Venus Williams	7–5, 6–0
Loss	2020	Australian Open	Hard	(United States) Sofia Kenin	6–4, 2–6, 2–6

== Other significant finals ==
=== Year-end championships finals ===
==== Singles: 1 (1 title) ====
Result	Year	Tournament	Surface	Opponent	Score
Win	2021	WTA Finals Guadalajara	Hard	(Estonia) Anett Kontaveit	6–3, 7–5

==== Doubles: 1 (1 runner-up) ====
Result	Year	Tournament	Surface	Partner	Opponents	Score
Loss	2015	WTA Finals Singapore	Hard (i)	(Spain) Carla Suárez Navarro	(Switzerland) Martina Hingis (India) Sania Mirza	0–6, 3–6

=== WTA 1000 finals ===
==== Singles: 5 (3 titles, 2 runner-ups) ====
Result	Year	Tournament	Surface	Opponent	Score
Loss	2015	Wuhan Open	Hard	(United States) Venus Williams	3–6, 0–3 ret.
Win	2015	China Open	Hard	(Switzerland) Timea Bacsinszky	7–5, 6–4
Win	2017	Cincinnati Open	Hard	(Romania) Simona Halep	6–1, 6–0
Loss	2018	Qatar Total Open	Hard	(Czech Republic) Petra Kvitová	6–3, 3–6, 4–6
Win	2021	Dubai Championships	Hard	(Czech Republic) Barbora Krejčíková	7–6^{(8–6)}, 6–3

==== Doubles: 3 (3 runner-ups) ====
Result	Year	Tournament	Surface	Partner	Opponents	Score
Loss	2014	Madrid Open	Clay	(Spain) Carla Suárez Navarro	(Italy) Sara Errani (Italy) Roberta Vinci	4–6, 3–6
Loss	2015	Dubai Championships	Hard	(Spain) Carla Suárez Navarro	(Hungary) Tímea Babos (France) Kristina Mladenovic	3–6, 2–6
Loss	2015	Madrid Open	Clay	(Spain) Carla Suárez Navarro	(Australia) Casey Dellacqua (Kazakhstan) Yaroslava Shvedova	3–6, 7–6^{(7–4)}, [5–10]

== WTA career finals ==
=== Singles: 17 (10 titles, 7 runner-ups) ===
Legend
Grand Slam (2–2)
WTA Finals (1–0)
WTA 1000 (3–2)
WTA 500 (1–2)
WTA 250 (3–1)

Result	W–L	Date	Tournament	Tier	Surface	Opponent	Score
Win	1–0	Jan 2014	Hobart International, Australia	International (Note: The WTA International tournaments were reclassified as WTA 250 tournaments in 2021.)	Hard	(Czech Republic) Klára Zakopalová	6–4, 6–0
Loss	1–1	Mar 2014	Brasil Cup, Brazil	International	Hard	(Czech Republic) Klára Zakopalová	6–4, 5–7, 0–6
Loss	1–2	Jul 2015	Wimbledon, United Kingdom	Grand Slam	Grass	(United States) Serena Williams	4–6, 4–6
Loss	1–3	Oct 2015	Wuhan Open, China	Premier 5 (Note: The WTA Premier 5 & Mandatory tournaments were reclassified as WTA 1000 tournaments in 2021.)	Hard	(United States) Venus Williams	3–6, 0–3 ret.
Win	2–3	Oct 2015	China Open, China	Premier M	Hard	(Switzerland) Timea Bacsinszky	7–5, 6–4
Win	3–3	Jun 2016	French Open, France	Grand Slam	Clay	(United States) Serena Williams	7–5, 6–4
Win	4–3	Jul 2017	Wimbledon, United Kingdom	Grand Slam	Grass	(United States) Venus Williams	7–5, 6–0
Win	5–3	Aug 2017	Cincinnati Open, United States	Premier 5	Hard	(Romania) Simona Halep	6–1, 6–0
Loss	5–4	Feb 2018	Qatar Open, Qatar	Premier 5	Hard	(Czech Republic) Petra Kvitová	6–3, 3–6, 4–6
Win	6–4	Apr 2018	Monterrey Open, Mexico	International	Hard	(Hungary) Tímea Babos	3–6, 6–4, 6–3
Win	7–4	Apr 2019	Monterrey Open, Mexico (2)	International	Hard	(Belarus) Victoria Azarenka	6–1, 3–1 ret.
Loss	7–5	Jan 2020	Australian Open, Australia	Grand Slam	Hard	(United States) Sofia Kenin	6–4, 2–6, 2–6
Loss	7–6	Feb 2021	Yarra Valley Classic, Australia	WTA 500	Hard	(Australia) Ashleigh Barty	6–7^{(3–7)}, 4–6
Loss	7–7	Mar 2021	Qatar Open, Qatar	WTA 500	Hard	(Czech Republic) Petra Kvitová	2–6, 1–6
Win	8–7	Mar 2021	Dubai Championships, UAE	WTA 1000	Hard	(Czech Republic) Barbora Krejčíková	7–6^{(8–6)}, 6–3
Win	9–7	Oct 2021	Chicago Fall Classic, United States	WTA 500	Hard	(Tunisia) Ons Jabeur	3–6, 6–3, 6–0
Win	10–7	Nov 2021	WTA Finals, Guadalajara	WTA Finals	Hard	(Estonia) Anett Kontaveit	6–3, 7–5

=== Doubles: 10 (5 titles, 5 runner-ups) ===
Legend
Grand Slam (0–0)
WTA Finals (0–1)
WTA 1000 (0–3)
WTA 500 (3–1)
WTA 250 (2–0)

Result	W–L	Date	Tournament	Tier	Surface	Partner	Opponents	Score
Win	1–0	Jan 2013	Hobart International, Australia	International	Hard	(Spain) María Teresa Torró Flor	(Hungary) Tímea Babos (Luxembourg) Mandy Minella	6–3, 7–6^{(7–5)}
Win	2–0	Apr 2014	Morocco Open, Morocco	International	Clay	(Switzerland) Romina Oprandi	(Poland) Katarzyna Piter (Ukraine) Maryna Zanevska	4–6, 6–2, [11–9]
Loss	2–1	May 2014	Madrid Open, Spain	Premier M	Clay	(Spain) Carla Suárez Navarro	(Italy) Sara Errani (Italy) Roberta Vinci	4–6, 3–6
Win	3–1	Aug 2014	Stanford Classic, United States	Premier (Note: The WTA Premier tournaments were reclassified as WTA 500 tournaments in 2021.)	Hard	(Spain) Carla Suárez Navarro	(Poland) Paula Kania (Czech Republic) Kateřina Siniaková	6–2, 4–6, [10–5]
Loss	3–2	Sep 2014	Pan Pacific Open, Japan	Premier	Hard	(Spain) Carla Suárez Navarro	(Zimbabwe) Cara Black (India) Sania Mirza	2–6, 5–7
Loss	3–3	Feb 2015	Dubai Championships, UAE	Premier 5	Hard	(Spain) Carla Suárez Navarro	(Hungary) Tímea Babos (France) Kristina Mladenovic	3–6, 2–6
Loss	3–4	May 2015	Madrid Open, Spain	Premier M	Clay	(Spain) Carla Suárez Navarro	(Australia) Casey Dellacqua (Kazakhstan) Yaroslava Shvedova	3–6, 7–6^{(7–4)}, [5–10]
Win	4–4	Jun 2015	Birmingham Classic, UK	Premier	Grass	(Spain) Carla Suárez Navarro	(Czech Republic) Andrea Hlaváčková (Czech Republic) Lucie Hradecká	6–4, 6–4
Win	5–4	Sep 2015	Pan Pacific Open, Japan	Premier	Hard	(Spain) Carla Suárez Navarro	(Chinese Taipei) Yung-jan Chan (Chinese Taipei) Hao-Ching Chan	7–5, 6–1
Loss	5–5	Nov 2015	WTA Finals, Singapore	WTA Finals	Hard (i)	(Spain) Carla Suárez Navarro	(Switzerland) Martina Hingis (India) Sania Mirza	0–6, 3–6

== ITF Circuit finals ==
=== Singles: 13 (7 titles, 6 runner-ups) ===
Legend
$100,000 tournaments (0–1)
$80,000 tournaments (0–0)
$60,000 tournaments (0–1)
$25,000 tournaments (3–0)
$15,000 tournaments (0–0)
$10,000 tournaments (4–4)

Result	W–L	Date	Tournament	Tier	Surface	Opponent	Score
Loss	0–1	May 2009	ITF Antalya, Turkey	10,000	Clay	(United Kingdom) Amanda Carreras	5–7, 5–7
Win	1–1	Dec 2009	ITF Vinaròs, Spain	10,000	Clay	(Bosnia and Herzegovina) Ema Burgić	6–2, 3–0 retired
Loss	1–2	Feb 2010	ITF Mallorca, Spain	10,000	Clay	(Russia) Viktoria Kamenskaya	6–7^{(4–7)}, 6–3, 2–6
Win	2–2	Feb 2010	ITF Mallorca, Spain	10,000	Clay	(Poland) Katarzyna Kawa	3–6, 6–2, 6–0
Loss	2–3	Mar 2011	ITF Antalya, Turkey	10,000	Clay	(Hungary) Réka-Luca Jani	2–6, 1–6
Win	3–3	Apr 2011	ITF Torrent, Valencia, Spain	10,000	Clay	(Venezuela) Marina Giral Lores	6–1, 6–3
Win	4–3	Jun 2011	ITF Montemor-o-Novo, Portugal	10,000	Clay	(Venezuela) Andrea Gámiz	6–4, 6–4
Loss	4–4	Jun 2011	ITF Alcobaça, Portugal	10,000	Clay	(France) Victoria Larrière	3–6, 6–3, 3–6
Win	5–4	Jul 2011	ITF Cáceres, Spain	25,000	Clay	(Turkey) Çağla Büyükakçay	6–4, 6–3
Loss	5–5	Sep 2011	Save Cup Mestre, Italy	50,000 (Note: The $50,000 ITF tournaments were reclassified as $60,000 in 2017.)	Clay	(Germany) Mona Barthel	5–7, 2–6
Win	6–5	Nov 2011	ITF Benicarló, Spain	25,000	Clay	(Bulgaria) Elitsa Kostova	7–6^{(7–3)}, 6–7^{(4–7)}, 6–3
Win	7–5	Mar 2012	ITF Clearwater, United States	25,000	Hard	(United States) Grace Min	6–0, 6–1
Loss	7–6	July 2012	Open Romania Ladies	100,000	Clay	(Spain) María Teresa Torró Flor	3–6, 6–4, 4–6

=== Doubles: 2 (1 title, 1 runner-up) ===
Legend
$100,000 tournaments
$80,000 tournaments
$60,000 tournaments
$25,000 tournaments
$15,000 tournaments
$10,000 tournaments (1–1)

Result	W–L	Date	Tournament	Tier	Surface	Partner	Opponents	Score
Loss	0–1	Sep 2009	ITF Lérida, Spain	10,000	Clay	(Mexico) Ximena Hermoso	(Georgia (country)) Sofia Kvatsabaia (Russia) Avgusta Tsybysheva	3–6, 2–6
Win	1–1	Oct 2009	ITF Les Franqueses del Vallès, Spain	10,000	Clay	(Mexico) Ximena Hermoso	(Israel) Efrat Mishor (Germany) Anna Zaja	6–2, 6–2

== WTA Tour career earnings ==
Year	Grand Slam singles titles	WTA singles titles	Total singles titles	Earnings ($)	Money list rank
2013	0	0	0	320,450	83
2014	0	1	1	1,194,824	22
2015	0	1	1	4,498,308	3
2016	1	0	1	3,903,388	7
2017	1	1	2	5,433,457	2
2018	0	1	1	2,675,489	14
2019	0	1	1	1,025,618	42
2020	0	0	0	1,942,072	5
2021	0	3	3	2,846,871	5
2022	0	0	0	715,649	57
2023	0	0	0	91,238	282
Career	2	8	10	24,813,892	20

== Career Grand Slam statistics ==
=== Seedings ===
The tournaments won by Muguruza are in boldface, and advanced into finals by Muguruza are in italics.

Year	Australian Open	French Open	Wimbledon	US Open
2012	did not play	did not qualify	did not qualify	not seeded
2013	not seeded	not seeded	not seeded	did not play
2014	not seeded	not seeded	27th	25th
2015	24th	21st	20th	9th
2016	3rd	**4th**	2nd	3rd
2017	7th	4th	**14th**	3rd
2018	3rd	3rd	3rd	12th
2019	18th	19th	26th	24th
2020	not seeded	11th	cancelled	10th
2021	14th	12th	11th	9th
2022	3rd	10th	9th	9th
2023	not seeded	did not play	did not play	did not play

=== Best Grand Slam results details ===
**Australian Open**
**2020 Australian Open (not seeded)**
Round	Opponent	Rank	Score
1R	(United States) Shelby Rogers (Q)	155	0–6, 6–1, 6–0
2R	(Australia) Ajla Tomljanović	52	6–3, 3–6, 6–3
3R	(Ukraine) Elina Svitolina (5)	5	6–1, 6–2
4R	(Netherlands) Kiki Bertens (9)	10	6–3, 6–3
QF	(Russia) Anastasia Pavlyuchenkova (30)	30	7–5, 6–3
SF	(Romania) Simona Halep (4)	3	7–6^{(10–8)}, 7–5
F	(United States) **Sofia Kenin (14)**	15	6–4, 2–6, 2–6

**Wimbledon Championships**
**2017 Wimbledon (14th Seed)**
Round	Opponent	Rank	Score
1R	(Russia) Ekaterina Alexandrova	75	6–2, 6–4
2R	(Belgium) Yanina Wickmayer	96	6–2, 6–4
3R	(Romania) Sorana Cîrstea	63	6–2, 6–2
4R	(Germany) Angelique Kerber (1)	**1**	4–6, 6–4, 6–4
QF	(Russia) Svetlana Kuznetsova (7)	8	6–3, 6–4
SF	(Slovakia) Magdaléna Rybáriková (PR)	87	6–1, 6–1
**W**	(United States) Venus Williams (10)	11	7–5, 6–0

**French Open**
**2016 French Open (4th Seed)**
Round	Opponent	Rank	Score
1R	(Slovakia) Anna Karolína Schmiedlová	38	3–6, 6–3, 6–3
2R	(France) Myrtille Georges	203	6–2, 6–0
3R	(Belgium) Yanina Wickmayer	54	6–3, 6–0
4R	(Russia) Svetlana Kuznetsova(13)	15	6–3, 6–4
QF	(United States) Shelby Rogers	108	7–5, 6–3
SF	(Australia) Samantha Stosur (21)	24	6–2, 6–4
**W**	(United States) Serena Williams (1)	**1**	7–5, 6–4

**US Open**
**2017 US Open (3rd Seed)**
Round	Opponent	Rank	Score
1R	(United States) Varvara Lepchenko	64	6–0, 6–3
2R	(China) Duan Yingying	92	6–4, 6–0
3R	(Slovakia) Magdaléna Rybáriková (31)	32	6–1, 6–1
4R	(Czech Republic) Petra Kvitová (13)	14	6–7^{(3–7)}, 3–6
**2021 US Open (9th Seed)**
Round	Opponent	Rank	Score
1R	(Croatia) Donna Vekić	57	7–6^{(7–4)}, 7–6^{(7–5)}
2R	(Germany) Andrea Petkovic	68	6–4, 6–2
3R	(Belarus) Victoria Azarenka (18)	19	6–4, 3–6, 6–2
4R	(Czech Republic) Barbora Krejčíková (8)	9	3–6, 6–7^{(4–7)}

== Wins against top 10 players ==
Season	2012	2013	2014	2015	2016	2017	2018	2019	2020	2021	Total
Wins	1	1	3	10	4	8	2	3	3	7	42

#	Player	Rk	Event	Surface	Rd	Score	Rk	Ref
2012
1.	(Russia) Vera Zvonareva	9	Miami Open, United States	Hard	2R	6–4, 6–3	208	
2013
2.	(Denmark) Caroline Wozniacki	9	Miami Open, United States	Hard	3R	6–2, 6–4	73	
2014
3.	(Denmark) Caroline Wozniacki	10	Australian Open, Australia	Hard	3R	4–6, 7–5, 6–3	38	
4.	(United States) Serena Williams	1	French Open, France	Clay	2R	6–2, 6–2	35	
5.	(Romania) Simona Halep	2	Wuhan Open, China	Hard	2R	2–6, 6–2, 6–3	22	
2015
6.	(Poland) Agnieszka Radwańska	6	Sydney International, Australia	Hard	2R	3–6, 7–6^{(7–4)}, 6–2	24	
7.	(Romania) Simona Halep	3	Fed Cup, Romania	Hard (i)	WG II	6–4, 6–3	24	
8.	(Poland) Agnieszka Radwańska	8	Dubai Championships, UAE	Hard	3R	6–4, 6–2	24	
9.	(Germany) Angelique Kerber	10	Wimbledon, United Kingdom	Grass	3R	7–6^{(14–12)}, 1–6, 6–2	20	
10.	(Denmark) Caroline Wozniacki	5	Wimbledon, United Kingdom	Grass	4R	6–4, 6–4	20	
11.	(Serbia) Ana Ivanovic	9	Wuhan Open, China	Hard	3R	4–6, 6–1, 6–0	8	
12.	(Poland) Agnieszka Radwańska	8	China Open, China	Hard	SF	4–6, 6–3, 6–4	5	
13.	(Czech Republic) Lucie Šafářová	9	WTA Finals, Singapore	Hard (i)	RR	6–3, 7–6^{(7–4)}	3	
14.	(Germany) Angelique Kerber	7	WTA Finals, Singapore	Hard (i)	RR	6–4, 6–4	3	
15.	(Czech Republic) Petra Kvitová	5	WTA Finals, Singapore	Hard (i)	RR	6–4, 4–6, 7–5	3	
2016
16.	(Italy) Roberta Vinci	8	Fed Cup, Spain	Clay	P-O (WG)	6–2, 6–2	4	
17.	(Switzerland) Timea Bacsinszky	10	Italian Open, Italy	Clay	QF	7–5, 6–2	4	
18.	(United States) Serena Williams	1	French Open, France	Clay	F	7–5, 6–4	4	
19.	(Russia) Svetlana Kuznetsova	9	WTA Finals, Singapore	Hard (i)	RR	3–6, 6–0, 6–1	6	
2017
20.	(Russia) Svetlana Kuznetsova	9	Brisbane International, Australia	Hard	QF	7–5, 6–4	7	
21.	(Ukraine) Elina Svitolina	10	Indian Wells Open, United States	Hard	4R	7–6^{(7–5)}, 1–6, 6–0	7	
22.	(Germany) Angelique Kerber	1	Wimbledon, United Kingdom	Grass	4R	4–6, 6–4, 6–4	15	
23.	(Russia) Svetlana Kuznetsova	8	Wimbledon, United Kingdom	Grass	QF	6–3, 6–4	15	
24.	(Russia) Svetlana Kuznetsova	8	Cincinnati Open, United States	Hard	QF	6–2, 5–7, 7–5	6	
25.	(Czech Republic) Karolína Plíšková	1	Cincinnati Open, United States	Hard	SF	6–3, 6–2	6	
26.	(Romania) Simona Halep	2	Cincinnati Open, United States	Hard	F	6–1, 6–0	6	
27.	(Latvia) Jeļena Ostapenko	7	WTA Finals, Singapore	Hard (i)	RR	6–3, 6–4	2	
2018
28.	(France) Caroline Garcia	7	Qatar Open, Qatar	Hard	QF	3–6, 6–1, 6–4	4	
29.	(France) Caroline Garcia	7	Dubai Championships, UAE	Hard	QF	7–5, 6–2	3	
2019
30.	(United States) Serena Williams	10	Indian Wells Open, United States	Hard	3R	6–3, 1–0 ret.	20	
31.	(Netherlands) Kiki Bertens	7	Indian Wells Open, United States	Hard	4R	5–7, 6–1, 6–4	20	
32.	(Ukraine) Elina Svitolina	9	French Open, France	Clay	3R	6–3, 6–3	19	
2020
33.	(Ukraine) Elina Svitolina	5	Australian Open, Australia	Hard	3R	6–1, 6–2	32	
34.	(Netherlands) Kiki Bertens	10	Australian Open, Australia	Hard	4R	6–3, 6–3	32	
35.	(Romania) Simona Halep	3	Australian Open, Australia	Hard	SF	7–6^{(10–8)}, 7–5	32	
2021
36.	(United States) Sofia Kenin	4	Yarra Valley Classic, Australia	Hard	QF	6–2, 6–2	15	
37.	(Belarus) Aryna Sabalenka	8	Qatar Open, Qatar	Hard	2R	6–2, 6–7^{(5–7)}, 6–3	16	
38.	(Belarus) Aryna Sabalenka	8	Dubai Championships, UAE	Hard	QF	3–6, 6–3, 6–2	16	
39.	(Czech Republic) Barbora Krejčíková	3	WTA Finals, Guadalajara	Hard	RR	2–6, 6–3, 6–4	5	
40.	(Estonia) Anett Kontaveit	8	WTA Finals, Guadalajara	Hard	RR	6–4, 6–4	5	
41.	(Spain) Paula Badosa	10	WTA Finals, Guadalajara	Hard	SF	6–3, 6–3	5	
42.	(Estonia) Anett Kontaveit	8	WTA Finals, Guadalajara	Hard	F	6–3, 7–5	5	

== Longest winning streaks ==
=== 9–match singles winning streak (2017) ===
#	Tournament	Category	Start date	Surface	Rd	Opponent	Rank	Score
–	Eastbourne International, United Kingdom	Premier	25 June 2017	Grass	2R	(Czech Republic) Barbora Strýcová	No. 23	1–6, 0–6
1	Wimbledon, United Kingdom	Grand Slam	3 Jul 2017	Grass	1R	(Russia) Ekaterina Alexandrova	No. 75	6–2, 6–4
2	Wimbledon, United Kingdom	Grand Slam	3 Jul 2017	Grass	2R	(Belgium) Yanina Wickmayer	No. 96	6–2, 6–4
3	Wimbledon, United Kingdom	Grand Slam	3 Jul 2017	Grass	3R	(Romania) Sorana Cîrstea	No. 63	6–2, 6–2
4	Wimbledon, United Kingdom	Grand Slam	3 Jul 2017	Grass	4R	(Germany) Angelique Kerber (1)	No. 1	4–6, 6–4, 6–4
5	Wimbledon, United Kingdom	Grand Slam	3 Jul 2017	Grass	QF	(Russia) Svetlana Kuznetsova (7)	No. 8	6–3, 6–4
6	Wimbledon, United Kingdom	Grand Slam	3 Jul 2017	Grass	SF	(Slovakia) Magdaléna Rybáriková (PR)	No. 87	6–1, 6–1
7	Wimbledon, United Kingdom	Grand Slam	3 Jul 2017	Grass	F	(United States) Venus Williams (10)	No. 11	7–5, 6–0
–	Stanford Classic, United States	Premier	31 Jul 2017	Hard	1R	bye		
8	Stanford Classic, United States	Premier	31 Jul 2017	Hard	2R	(United States) Kayla Day	No. 129	6–2, 6–0
9	Stanford Classic, United States	Premier	31 Jul 2017	Hard	QF	(Croatia) Ana Konjuh (5)	No. 20	6–1, 6–3
–	Stanford Classic, United States	Premier	31 Jul 2017	Hard	SF	(United States) Madison Keys (3)	No. 21	3–6, 2–6
