= 2018 Monterrey Open – Singles =

Singles
- 2018 Monterrey Open

Final
- Champion: (Spain) Garbiñe Muguruza
- Runner-up: (Hungary) Tímea Babos
- Score: 3–6, 6–4, 6–3

Details
- Draw: 32
- Seeds: 8

Events
Singles	Doubles
- Monterrey Open

Anastasia Pavlyuchenkova was the defending champion, but withdrew before the tournament began.

Garbiñe Muguruza won the title, defeating Tímea Babos in the final, 3–6, 6–4, 6–3.

== Seeds ==
1. (Spain) Garbiñe Muguruza (champion)
2. (Slovakia) Magdaléna Rybáriková (quarterfinals)
3. (Ukraine) Lesia Tsurenko (second round, withdrew)
4. (Hungary) Tímea Babos (final)
5. (Puerto Rico) Monica Puig (quarterfinals)
6. (Romania) Ana Bogdan (semifinals)
7. (United States) Sachia Vickery (semifinals)
8. (Australia) Ajla Tomljanović (quarterfinals)

== Draw ==
Key

- Q = Qualifier
- WC = Wild card
- LL = Lucky loser
- Alt = Alternate
- ITF = ITF entry
- PR = Protected ranking
- SR = Special ranking
- SE = Special exempt
- JE = Junior exempt
- JR = Junior Accelerator Programme entrant
- CO = College Accelerator Programme entrant
- NG = Next Gen Accelerator Program entrant
- w/o = Walkover
- r = Retired
- d = Defaulted

=== Finals ===
Semifinals
1	(Spain) Garbiñe Muguruza	6	7
6	(Romania) Ana Bogdan	0	5
4	(Hungary) Tímea Babos	1	6	6
7	(United States) Sachia Vickery	6	2	2

Final
1	(Spain) Garbiñe Muguruza	3	6	6
4	(Hungary) Tímea Babos	6	4	3

=== Top half ===
First round
1	(Spain) G Muguruza	6	6
WC	(Mexico) R Zarazúa	1	1
(Russia) E Rodina	0	6^{4}
(United States) A Riske	6	7^{7}
(Russia) A Blinkova	7^{9}	5	6
(Sweden) R Peterson	6^{7}	7	4
(Slovakia) AK Schmiedlová	6	1	6^{6}
8	(Australia) A Tomljanović	4	6	7^{8}
3	(Ukraine) L Tsurenko	6^{2}	6	6
(Japan) N Hibino	7^{7}	4	4
(Colombia) M Duque Mariño	1	3
(United States) D Collins	6	6
(Spain) S Sorribes Tormo	6	7
(Czech Republic) T Martincová	1	5
WC	(Mexico) V Rodríguez	6	4	6^{5}
6	(Romania) A Bogdan	4	6	7^{7}

Second round
1	(Spain) G Muguruza	6	6
(United States) A Riske	2	3
(Russia) A Blinkova	2	7	2
8	(Australia) A Tomljanović	6	5	6
3	(Ukraine) L Tsurenko
(United States) D Collins	w/o
(Spain) S Sorribes Tormo	2	3
6	(Romania) A Bogdan	6	6

Quarterfinals
1	(Spain) G Muguruza	6	6
8	(Australia) A Tomljanović	3	0
(United States) D Collins	2	4
6	(Romania) A Bogdan	6	6

Semifinals
1	(Spain) G Muguruza	6	7
6	(Romania) A Bogdan	0	5

=== Bottom half ===
First round
5	(Puerto Rico) M Puig	6	6
(United States) N Gibbs	3	3
(Switzerland) S Vögele	6	6
Q	(Slovenia) D Jakupović	3	4
(United Kingdom) N Broady	6	6^{5}	6
(Canada) C Zhao	3	7^{7}	2
Q	(Czech Republic) M Bouzková	3	4
4	(Hungary) T Babos	6	6
7	(United States) S Vickery	6	6
(United States) I Falconi	1	4
Q	(United States) UM Arconada	3	6	4
WC	(Mexico) AS Sánchez	6	4	6
Q	(Greece) V Grammatikopoulou	0	2
(Croatia) J Fett	6	6
(Japan) R Ozaki	4	3
2	(Slovakia) M Rybáriková	6	6

Second round
5	(Puerto Rico) M Puig	6	6
(Switzerland) S Vögele	4	3
(United Kingdom) N Broady	3	7^{8}	5
4	(Hungary) T Babos	6	6^{6}	7
7	(United States) S Vickery	6	6
WC	(Mexico) AS Sánchez	3	3
(Croatia) J Fett	5	2
2	(Slovakia) M Rybáriková	7	6

Quarterfinals
5	(Puerto Rico) M Puig	4	2
4	(Hungary) T Babos	6	6
7	(United States) S Vickery	6	6
2	(Slovakia) M Rybáriková	0	3

Semifinals
4	(Hungary) T Babos	1	6	6
7	(United States) S Vickery	6	2	2

== Qualifying ==
=== Seeds ===
1. (Belgium) Ysaline Bonaventure (first round)
2. (Japan) Miyu Kato (second round)
3. (Italy) Jasmine Paolini (qualifying competition)
4. (United States) Jamie Loeb (second round)
5. (Australia) Lizette Cabrera (first round)
6. (Slovenia) Dalila Jakupović (qualified)
7. (Czech Republic) Marie Bouzková (qualified)
8. (Switzerland) Conny Perrin (qualifying competition)

=== Qualifiers ===
1. (Greece) Valentini Grammatikopoulou
2. (Slovenia) Dalila Jakupović
3. (United States) Usue Maitane Arconada
4. (Czech Republic) Marie Bouzková

=== Draw ===
==== First qualifier ====
First round
1	(Belgium) Ysaline Bonaventure	6^{5}	7^{7}	1
(Australia) Priscilla Hon	7^{7}	6^{2}	6
(Croatia) Tereza Mrdeža	3	6	2
(Greece) Valentini Grammatikopoulou	6	2	6
(United States) Ashley Kratzer	6	1	3
WC	(Russia) Yana Sizikova	3	6	6
(United States) Emina Bektas	3	3
8	(Switzerland) Conny Perrin	6	6

Second round
(Australia) Priscilla Hon	6^{4}	3
(Greece) Valentini Grammatikopoulou	7^{7}	6
WC	(Russia) Yana Sizikova	5	0
8	(Switzerland) Conny Perrin	7	6

Qualifying competition
(Greece) Valentini Grammatikopoulou	6	6
8	(Switzerland) Conny Perrin	2	2

==== Second qualifier ====
First round
2	(Japan) Miyu Kato	6	6
WC	(Mexico) Andrea Renée Villarreal	2	3
(Argentina) Nadia Podoroska	4	6	5
(United States) Sabrina Santamaria	6	2	7
(Sweden) Cornelia Lister	5	6	6
(Russia) Valeria Savinykh	7	3	2
(Russia) Irina Khromacheva	2	3
6	(Slovenia) Dalila Jakupović	6	6

Second round
2	(Japan) Miyu Kato	6	3	3
(United States) Sabrina Santamaria	1	6	6
(Sweden) Cornelia Lister	4	6^{6}
6	(Slovenia) Dalila Jakupović	6	7^{8}

Qualifying competition
(United States) Sabrina Santamaria	2	5
6	(Slovenia) Dalila Jakupović	6	7

==== Third qualifier ====
First round
3	(Italy) Jasmine Paolini	6	2	6
WC	(Mexico) Marcela Zacarías	2	6	1
(Japan) Miharu Imanishi	6^{6}	6	4
(Venezuela) Andrea Gámiz	7^{8}	4	6
(Serbia) Jovana Jakšić	6	3	6
(Ukraine) Olga Ianchuk	3	6	4
(United States) Usue Maitane Arconada	6	6
5	(Australia) Lizette Cabrera	3	4

Second round
3	(Italy) Jasmine Paolini	6	6
(Venezuela) Andrea Gámiz	0	0
(Serbia) Jovana Jakšić	5	1
(United States) Usue Maitane Arconada	7	6

Qualifying competition
3	(Italy) Jasmine Paolini	1	7	1
(United States) Usue Maitane Arconada	6	5	6

==== Fourth qualifier ====
First round
4	(United States) Jamie Loeb	6	6
(United States) Danielle Lao	3	2
(Mexico) Giuliana Olmos	0	2
(Israel) Deniz Khazaniuk	6	6
(Spain) Aliona Bolsova Zadoinov	6	6
WC	(United States) Rushri Wijesundera	1	3
(United States) Jacqueline Cako	3	4
7	(Czech Republic) Marie Bouzková	6	6

Second round
4	(United States) Jamie Loeb	3	2
(Israel) Deniz Khazaniuk	6	6
(Spain) Aliona Bolsova Zadoinov	1	2
7	(Czech Republic) Marie Bouzková	6	6

Qualifying competition
(Israel) Deniz Khazaniuk	2	7	5
7	(Czech Republic) Marie Bouzková	6	5	7
