= 2019 Monterrey Open – Singles =

Singles
- 2019 Monterrey Open

Final
- Champion: (Spain) Garbiñe Muguruza
- Runner-up: (Belarus) Victoria Azarenka
- Score: 6–1, 3–1, ret.

Details
- Draw: 32
- Seeds: 8

Events
Singles	Doubles
- Monterrey Open

Garbiñe Muguruza was the reigning champion and successfully defended her title, after Victoria Azarenka retired in the final with a leg injury with the score at 6–1, 3–1.

== Seeds ==
1. (Germany) Angelique Kerber (semifinals)
2. (Spain) Garbiñe Muguruza (champion)
3. (Russia) Anastasia Pavlyuchenkova (quarterfinals)
4. (United States) Alison Riske (first round)
5. (Belarus) Victoria Azarenka (final, retired)
6. (Belgium) Kirsten Flipkens (quarterfinals)
7. (France) Kristina Mladenovic (quarterfinals)
8. (Slovakia) Magdaléna Rybáriková (semifinals)

== Draw ==
Key

- Q = Qualifier
- WC = Wild card
- LL = Lucky loser
- Alt = Alternate
- ITF = ITF entry
- PR = Protected ranking
- SR = Special ranking
- SE = Special exempt
- JE = Junior exempt
- JR = Junior Accelerator Programme entrant
- CO = College Accelerator Programme entrant
- NG = Next Gen Accelerator Program entrant
- w/o = Walkover
- r = Retired
- d = Defaulted

=== Finals ===
Semifinals
1	(Germany) Angelique Kerber	4	6	1
5	(Belarus) Victoria Azarenka	6	4	6
8	(Slovakia) Magdaléna Rybáriková	2	3
2	(Spain) Garbiñe Muguruza	6	6

Final
5	(Belarus) Victoria Azarenka	1	1^{r}
2	(Spain) Garbiñe Muguruza	6	3

=== Top half ===
First round
1	(Germany) A Kerber	7^{7}	6
Q	(Slovakia) K Kučová	6^{4}	2
Q	(China) S Xu	4	7	3
(Czech Republic) K Muchová	6	5	6
(United Kingdom) H Dart	2	3
(Slovenia) D Jakupović	6	6
(Serbia) O Danilović	2	1
6	(Belgium) K Flipkens	6	6
3	(Russia) A Pavlyuchenkova	6	6
(Russia) A Blinkova	0	3
(Hungary) T Babos	6	4	3
(Serbia) I Jorović	2	6	6
WC	(Mexico) R Zarazúa	5	4
(Kazakhstan) Z Diyas	7	6
Q	(Japan) M Kato	4	2
5	(Belarus) V Azarenka	6	6

Second round
1	(Germany) A Kerber	6	6
(Czech Republic) K Muchová	3	4
(Slovenia) D Jakupović	3	3
6	(Belgium) K Flipkens	6	6
3	(Russia) A Pavlyuchenkova	6	6
(Serbia) I Jorović	0	0
(Kazakhstan) Z Diyas	3	2
5	(Belarus) V Azarenka	6	6

Quarterfinals
1	(Germany) A Kerber	6	6
6	(Belgium) K Flipkens	2	4
3	(Russia) A Pavlyuchenkova	0	4
5	(Belarus) V Azarenka	6	6

Semifinals
1	(Germany) A Kerber	4	6	1
5	(Belarus) V Azarenka	6	4	6

=== Bottom half ===
First round
8	(Slovakia) M Rybáriková	2	7^{7}	6
(Japan) M Doi	6	6^{5}	4
(Romania) A Bogdan	6^{4}	2
(Switzerland) S Vögele	7^{7}	6
(Japan) N Hibino	4	6	7^{7}
WC	(Mexico) G Olmos	6	1	6^{5}
(United States) S Vickery	7^{8}	6
4	(United States) A Riske	6^{6}	1
7	(France) K Mladenovic	6	1	7^{7}
Q	(Brazil) B Haddad Maia	4	6	6^{5}
LL	(Hungary) G Arn	7	3	7
(Spain) L Arruabarrena	5	6	5
WC	(Mexico) V Rodríguez	1	0
(Russia) M Gasparyan	6	6
LL	(Romania) E-G Ruse	4	6^{4}
2	(Spain) G Muguruza	6	7^{7}

Second round
8	(Slovakia) M Rybáriková	5	6	6
(Switzerland) S Vögele	7	2	3
(Japan) N Hibino	5	7	6^{5}
(United States) S Vickery	7	5	7^{7}
7	(France) K Mladenovic	6	6
LL	(Hungary) G Arn	0	2
(Russia) M Gasparyan	3	7^{7}	2
2	(Spain) G Muguruza	6	6^{1}	6

Quarterfinals
8	(Slovakia) M Rybáriková	6	6
(United States) S Vickery	4	4
7	(France) K Mladenovic	1	6^{5}
2	(Spain) G Muguruza	6	7^{7}

Semifinals
8	(Slovakia) M Rybáriková	2	3
2	(Spain) G Muguruza	6	6

== Qualifying ==
=== Seeds ===
1. (Czech Republic) Marie Bouzková (first round)
2. (United States) Christina McHale (first round)
3. (Romania) Monica Niculescu (second round, withdrew)
4. (Brazil) Beatriz Haddad Maia (qualified)
5. (United States) Danielle Lao (second round)
6. (China) Lu Jiajing (first round)
7. (United Kingdom) Katie Swan (first round)
8. (United States) Kristie Ahn (second round)

=== Qualifiers ===
1. (Japan) Miyu Kato
2. (Slovakia) Kristína Kučová
3. (China) Xu Shilin
4. (Brazil) Beatriz Haddad Maia

=== Lucky losers ===
1. (Hungary) Gréta Arn
2. (Romania) Elena-Gabriela Ruse

=== Draw ===
==== First qualifier ====
First round
1	(Czech Republic) Marie Bouzková	6	4	4
(Japan) Hiroko Kuwata	3	6	6
(United States) Ashley Kratzer	6^{4}	6	3
(Japan) Miyu Kato	7^{7}	2	6
(Russia) Alexandra Panova	6	7^{12}
(Croatia) Jana Fett	2	6^{10}
(United States) Asia Muhammad	7^{7}	6
6	(China) Lu Jiajing	6^{3}	4

Second round
(Japan) Hiroko Kuwata	6	3	5
(Japan) Miyu Kato	1	6	7
(Russia) Alexandra Panova	1	6	6
(United States) Asia Muhammad	6	3	3

Qualifying competition
(Japan) Miyu Kato	6	6
(Russia) Alexandra Panova	4	0

==== Second qualifier ====
First round
2	(United States) Christina McHale	2	4
(Slovakia) Kristína Kučová	6	6
(Chile) Alexa Guarachi	6	6
WC	(Mexico) Romary Cárdenas Rifka	1	0
(United States) Maria Sanchez	3	6^{4}
(Serbia) Jovana Jakšić	6	7^{7}
(Romania) Elena-Gabriela Ruse	6	7
7	(United Kingdom) Katie Swan	2	5

Second round
(Slovakia) Kristína Kučová	6	6
(Chile) Alexa Guarachi	1	0
(Serbia) Jovana Jakšić	2	4
(Romania) Elena-Gabriela Ruse	6	6

Qualifying competition
(Slovakia) Kristína Kučová	6	6
(Romania) Elena-Gabriela Ruse	2	3

==== Third qualifier ====
First round
3	(Romania) Monica Niculescu	7^{7}	6
(Serbia) Natalija Kostić	6^{2}	2
WC	(Mexico) Ana Karen Guadiana Campos	7^{7}	7^{7}
WC	(United States) Nikita Uberoi	6^{3}	6^{4}
(China) Xu Shilin	6	6
(Mexico) Ana Sofía Sánchez	2	1
(Russia) Valeria Savinykh	3	5
8	(United States) Kristie Ahn	6	7

Second round
3	(Romania) Monica Niculescu
WC	(Mexico) Ana Karen Guadiana Campos	w/o
(China) Xu Shilin	7	6
8	(United States) Kristie Ahn	5	1

Qualifying competition
WC	(Mexico) Ana Karen Guadiana Campos	2	2
(China) Xu Shilin	6	6

==== Fourth qualifier ====
First round
4	(Brazil) Beatriz Haddad Maia	6	6
WC	(Mexico) Marcela Zacarías	2	4
(Russia) Yana Sizikova	4	1
(Venezuela) Andrea Gámiz	6	6
(Hungary) Gréta Arn	6^{2}	6	6
(Romania) Andreea Roșca	7^{7}	4	1
(Israel) Deniz Khazaniuk	4	2
5	(United States) Danielle Lao	6	6

Second round
4	(Brazil) Beatriz Haddad Maia	6	6
(Venezuela) Andrea Gámiz	1	4
(Hungary) Gréta Arn	6	6
5	(United States) Danielle Lao	4	1

Qualifying competition
4	(Brazil) Beatriz Haddad Maia	6	7
(Hungary) Gréta Arn	4	5
