= 2020 Monterrey Open =

Women's tennis tournament in Mexico

- Date: 2–8 March
- Edition: 12th
- Category: WTA International
- Draw: 32S / 16D
- Prize money: $275,000
- Surface: Hard / outdoor
- Location: Monterrey, Mexico

Champions

Singles
- (Ukraine) Elina Svitolina

Doubles
- (Ukraine) Kateryna Bondarenko / (Canada) Sharon Fichman
- Monterrey Open

The 2020 Monterrey Open, also known as the Abierto GNP Seguros for sponsorship reasons, was a women's tennis tournament played on outdoor hard courts. It was the 12th edition of the Monterrey Open and an International tournament on the 2020 WTA Tour. It took place at the Club Sonoma in Monterrey, Mexico, from 2 March through 8 March 2020. First-seeded Elina Svitolina won the singles title.

== Finals ==
=== Singles ===
- (Ukraine) Elina Svitolina defeated (Czech Republic) Marie Bouzková, 7–5, 4–6, 6–4

=== Doubles ===
- (Ukraine) Kateryna Bondarenko / (Canada) Sharon Fichman defeated (Japan) Miyu Kato / (China) Wang Yafan, 4–6, 6–3, [10–7]

== Points and prize money ==
=== Point distribution ===
Event	W	F	SF	QF	Round of 16	Round of 32	Q	Q2	Q1
Singles	280	180	110	60	30	1	18	12	1
Doubles	280	180	110	60	1	—N/a	—N/a	—N/a	—N/a

=== Prize money ===
Event	W	F	SF	QF	Round of 16	Round of 32	Q2	Q1
Singles	$43,000	$21,400	$11,600	$6,275	$3,600	$2,300	$1,685	$1,100
Doubles*	$13,580	$7,200	$4,000	$2,300	$1,520	—N/a	—N/a	—N/a

_{*per team}

== Singles main draw entrants ==
=== Seeds ===
Country	Player	Ranking^{1}	Seed
UKR	Elina Svitolina	7	1
GBR	Johanna Konta	15	2
~~KAZ~~	~~Yulia Putintseva~~	~~32~~	~~3~~
~~POL~~	~~Magda Linette~~	~~33~~	~~4~~
USA	Sloane Stephens	35	5
SWE	Rebecca Peterson	43	6
BLR	Victoria Azarenka	51	7
CHN	Wang Yafan	56	8
CZE	Marie Bouzková	57	9
USA	Lauren Davis	60	10

- ^{1} Rankings as of 24 February 2020.

=== Other entrants ===
The following players received wildcards into the main draw:

- (Belgium) Kim Clijsters
- (United States) Emma Navarro
- (United States) Sloane Stephens
- (United States) Venus Williams

The following player received entry into the singles main draw using a protected ranking:

- (Ukraine) Kateryna Bondarenko

The following player received entry as a special exempt:

- (Canada) Leylah Annie Fernandez

The following players received entry from the qualifying draw:

- (Spain) Lara Arruabarrena
- (Italy) Giulia Gatto-Monticone
- (Belarus) Olga Govortsova
- (Argentina) Nadia Podoroska
- (Slovakia) Anna Karolína Schmiedlová
- (Switzerland) Stefanie Vögele

The following players received entry as lucky losers:

- (United States) Caroline Dolehide
- (Russia) Varvara Flink
- (Slovakia) Kristína Kučová
- (Australia) Astra Sharma

=== Withdrawals ===
Before the tournament

- (Kazakhstan) Zarina Diyas → replaced by (Slovakia) Kristína Kučová
- (France) Fiona Ferro → replaced by (Netherlands) Arantxa Rus
- (Belgium) Kirsten Flipkens → replaced by (Australia) Astra Sharma
- (Poland) Magda Linette → replaced by (United States) Caroline Dolehide
- (China) Zheng Saisai → replaced by (Spain) Sara Sorribes Tormo
- (Kazakhstan) Yulia Putintseva → replaced by (Russia) Varvara Flink

=== Retirements ===
- (Russia) Varvara Flink

== Doubles main draw entrants ==
=== Seeds ===
Country	Player	Country	Player	Rank^{1}	Seed
ESP	Georgina García Pérez	ESP	Sara Sorribes Tormo	115	1
USA	Desirae Krawczyk	MEX	Giuliana Olmos	116	2
AUS	Ellen Perez	AUS	Storm Sanders	128	3
AUS	Monique Adamczak	USA	Maria Sanchez	149	4

- Rankings as of February 24, 2020.

=== Other entrants ===
The following pairs received wildcards into the doubles main draw:

- (Italy) Elisabetta Cocciaretto / (Mexico) Renata Zarazúa
- (Italy) Sara Errani / (Chile) Daniela Seguel

=== Withdrawals ===
During the tournament

- (United Kingdom) Johanna Konta
