= 2018 Monterrey Open – Doubles =

Doubles
- 2018 Monterrey Open

Final
- Champions: (United Kingdom) Naomi Broady (Spain) Sara Sorribes Tormo
- Runners-up: (United States) Desirae Krawczyk (Mexico) Giuliana Olmos
- Score: 3–6, 6–4, [10–8]

Details
- Draw: 16
- Seeds: 4

Events
Singles	Doubles
← 2017 ·	Monterrey Open	· 2019 →

Nao Hibino and Alicja Rosolska were the defending champions, but Rosolska chose to compete in Charleston instead. Hibino played alongside Darija Jurak, but lost in the quarterfinals to Valeria Savinykh and Yana Sizikova.

Naomi Broady and Sara Sorribes Tormo won the title, defeating Desirae Krawczyk and Giuliana Olmos in the final, 3–6, 6–4, [10–8].

== Seeds ==
1. (Japan) Nao Hibino / (Croatia) Darija Jurak (quarterfinals)
2. (Argentina) María Irigoyen / (Japan) Miyu Kato (quarterfinals)
3. (Slovenia) Dalila Jakupović / (Russia) Irina Khromacheva (quarterfinals)
4. (Russia) Anna Blinkova / (Belarus) Lidziya Marozava (first round)

== Draw ==
=== Key ===
- Q = Qualifier
- WC = Wild card
- LL = Lucky loser
- Alt = Alternate
- SE = Special exempt
- PR = Protected ranking
- ITF = ITF entry
- JE = Junior exempt
- w/o = Walkover
- r = Retired
- d = Defaulted
- SR = Special ranking

=== Draw ===
First round
1	(Japan) N Hibino (Croatia) D Jurak	7	6
(Belgium) Y Bonaventure (Mexico) V Rodríguez	5	1
WC	(Mexico) M Zacarías (Mexico) R Zarazúa	3	0
(Russia) V Savinykh (Russia) Y Sizikova	6	6
3	(Slovenia) D Jakupović (Russia) I Khromacheva	6	6
(Argentina) N Podoroska (India) P Thombare	2	2
(United States) K Christian (United States) S Santamaria	3	7^{7}	[4]
(United States) D Krawczyk (Mexico) G Olmos	6	6^{4}	[10]
(United States) E Bektas (Australia) P Hon	6	5	[8]
(Colombia) M Duque Mariño (Russia) E Rodina	4	7	[10]
(United States) I Falconi (Ukraine) L Tsurenko	3	6	[10]
4	(Russia) A Blinkova (Belarus) L Marozava	6	3	[8]
(United States) J Cako (Sweden) C Lister	3	2
(United Kingdom) N Broady (Spain) S Sorribes Tormo	6	6
WC	(Serbia) J Jakšić (Mexico) AS Sánchez	0	6	[7]
2	(Argentina) M Irigoyen (Japan) M Kato	6	3	[10]

Quarterfinals
1	(Japan) N Hibino (Croatia) D Jurak	2	6^{6}
(Russia) V Savinykh (Russia) Y Sizikova	6	7^{8}
3	(Slovenia) D Jakupović (Russia) I Khromacheva	3	5
(United States) D Krawczyk (Mexico) G Olmos	6	7
(Colombia) M Duque Mariño (Russia) E Rodina	w/o
(United States) I Falconi (Ukraine) L Tsurenko
(United Kingdom) N Broady (Spain) S Sorribes Tormo	6	6
2	(Argentina) M Irigoyen (Japan) M Kato	3	2

Semifinals
(Russia) V Savinykh (Russia) Y Sizikova	7	6^{4}	[1]
(United States) D Krawczyk (Mexico) G Olmos	5	7^{7}	[10]
(Colombia) M Duque Mariño (Russia) E Rodina	3	1
(United Kingdom) N Broady (Spain) S Sorribes Tormo	6	6

Final
(United States) D Krawczyk (Mexico) G Olmos	6	4	[8]
(United Kingdom) N Broady (Spain) S Sorribes Tormo	3	6	[10]
