= 2020 Monterrey Open – Singles =

Singles
- 2020 Monterrey Open

Final
- Champion: (Ukraine) Elina Svitolina
- Runner-up: (Czech Republic) Marie Bouzková
- Score: 7–5, 4–6, 6–4

Details
- Draw: 32
- Seeds: 8

Events
Singles	Doubles
- Monterrey Open

Garbiñe Muguruza was the two-time defending champion, but chose not to participate.

Elina Svitolina won the title, defeating Marie Bouzková in the final, 7–5, 4–6, 6–4. It was her first WTA Tour title since winning the WTA Finals in October 2018.

== Seeds ==
1. (Ukraine) Elina Svitolina (champion)
2. (United Kingdom) Johanna Konta (semifinals)
3. (Kazakhstan) Yulia Putintseva (withdrew)
4. (Poland) Magda Linette (withdrew)
5. (United States) Sloane Stephens (second round)
6. (Sweden) Rebecca Peterson (quarterfinals)
7. (Belarus) Victoria Azarenka (first round)
8. (China) Wang Yafan (quarterfinals)
9. (Czech Republic) Marie Bouzková (final)
10. (United States) Lauren Davis (second round)

== Draw ==
Key

- Q = Qualifier
- WC = Wild card
- LL = Lucky loser
- Alt = Alternate
- ITF = ITF entry
- PR = Protected ranking
- SR = Special ranking
- SE = Special exempt
- JE = Junior exempt
- JR = Junior Accelerator Programme entrant
- CO = College Accelerator Programme entrant
- NG = Next Gen Accelerator Program entrant
- w/o = Walkover
- r = Retired
- d = Defaulted

=== Finals ===
Semifinals
1	(Ukraine) Elina Svitolina	6	6
(Netherlands) Arantxa Rus	0	1
9	(Czech Republic) Marie Bouzková	6	6
2	(United Kingdom) Johanna Konta	3	4

Final
1	(Ukraine) Elina Svitolina	7	4	6
9	(Czech Republic) Marie Bouzková	5	6	4

=== Top half ===
First round
1	(Ukraine) E Svitolina	6	6
(Montenegro) D Kovinić	3	2
Q	(Belarus) O Govortsova	3	6	6
LL	(United States) C Dolehide	6	2	1
Q	(Switzerland) S Vögele	6^{5}	2
SE	(Canada) L Fernandez	7^{7}	6
WC	(United States) E Navarro	4	7	1
5/WC	(United States) S Stephens	6	5	6
10	(United States) L Davis	6	6
Q	(Argentina) N Podoroska	0	3
(Netherlands) A Rus	4
LL	(Russia) V Flink	3^{r}
PR	(Ukraine) K Bondarenko	4	6	6
(Spain) S Sorribes Tormo	6	0	2
(Ukraine) K Kozlova	6	6^{1}	4
6	(Sweden) R Peterson	3	7^{7}	6

Second round
1	(Ukraine) E Svitolina	6	6
Q	(Belarus) O Govortsova	3	4
SE	(Canada) L Fernandez	6^{4}	6	6
5/WC	(United States) S Stephens	7^{7}	3	3
10	(United States) L Davis	5	0
(Netherlands) A Rus	7	6
PR	(Ukraine) K Bondarenko	6^{2}	5
6	(Sweden) R Peterson	7^{7}	7

Quarterfinals
1	(Ukraine) E Svitolina	6	7
SE	(Canada) L Fernandez	4	5
(Netherlands) A Rus	6	6
6	(Sweden) R Peterson	1	1

Semifinals
1	(Ukraine) E Svitolina	6	6
(Netherlands) A Rus	0	1

=== Bottom half ===
First round
8	(China) Y Wang	6	6
Q	(Spain) L Arruabarrena	4	4
LL	(Australia) A Sharma	6	6
(Serbia) N Stojanović	4	4
WC	(United States) V Williams	6	3	2
Q	(Slovakia) AK Schmiedlová	4	6	6
LL	(Slovakia) K Kučová	4	2
9	(Czech Republic) M Bouzková	6	6
7	(Belarus) V Azarenka	2	2
(Slovenia) T Zidanšek	6	6
(Russia) A Potapova	6	4	6
Q	(Italy) G Gatto-Monticone	4	6	4
(United Kingdom) H Watson	6^{4}	6	5
(Germany) T Maria	7^{7}	3	7
WC	(Belgium) K Clijsters	3	5
2	(United Kingdom) J Konta	6	7

Second round
8	(China) Y Wang	7^{7}	4	6
LL	(Australia) A Sharma	6^{5}	6	3
Q	(Slovakia) AK Schmiedlová	4	1
9	(Czech Republic) M Bouzková	6	6
(Slovenia) T Zidanšek	6	6^{3}	1
(Russia) A Potapova	1	7^{7}	6
(Germany) T Maria	6^{4}	3
2	(United Kingdom) J Konta	7^{7}	6

Quarterfinals
8	(China) Y Wang	2	5
9	(Czech Republic) M Bouzková	6	7
(Russia) A Potapova	7^{8}	3	6^{7}
2	(United Kingdom) J Konta	6^{6}	6	7^{9}

Semifinals
9	(Czech Republic) M Bouzková	6	6
2	(United Kingdom) J Konta	3	4

== Qualifying ==
=== Seeds ===
1. (Italy) Jasmine Paolini (first round)
2. (Switzerland) Stefanie Vögele (qualified)
3. (Australia) Maddison Inglis (first round)
4. (Australia) Lizette Cabrera (first round)
5. (Slovenia) Kaja Juvan (first round)
6. (Australia) Astra Sharma (Qualifying competition, lucky loser)
7. (Russia) Varvara Flink (Qualifying competition, lucky loser)
8. (United States) Caroline Dolehide (Qualifying competition, lucky loser)
9. (Belarus) Olga Govortsova (qualified)
10. (Italy) Martina Trevisan (qualifying competition)
11. (Italy) Giulia Gatto-Monticone (qualified)
12. (Italy) Elisabetta Cocciaretto (qualifying competition)

=== Qualifiers ===
1. (Belarus) Olga Govortsova
2. (Switzerland) Stefanie Vögele
3. (Spain) Lara Arruabarrena
4. (Slovakia) Anna Karolína Schmiedlová
5. (Argentina) Nadia Podoroska
6. (Italy) Giulia Gatto-Monticone

=== Lucky losers ===
1. (Australia) Astra Sharma
2. (Russia) Varvara Flink
3. (United States) Caroline Dolehide
4. (Slovakia) Kristína Kučová

=== Qualifying draw ===
==== First qualifier ====
First round
1	(Italy) Jasmine Paolini	5	1
(Slovakia) Kristína Kučová	7	6
WC	(Mexico) Marcela Zacarías	0	5
9	(Belarus) Olga Govortsova	6	7

Qualifying competition
(Slovakia) Kristína Kučová	2	2
9	(Belarus) Olga Govortsova	6	6

==== Second qualifier ====
First round
2	(Switzerland) Stefanie Vögele	7^{7}	7
(Italy) Sara Errani	6^{2}	5
(Slovenia) Dalila Jakupović	6^{5}	3
10	(Italy) Martina Trevisan	7^{7}	6

Qualifying competition
2	(Switzerland) Stefanie Vögele	6^{4}	7	6
10	(Italy) Martina Trevisan	7^{7}	5	4

==== Third qualifier ====
First round
3	(Australia) Maddison Inglis	2	2
(Spain) Lara Arruabarrena	6	6
WC	(Mexico) Ana Sofía Sánchez	3	6	5
8	(United States) Caroline Dolehide	6	4	7

Qualifying competition
(Spain) Lara Arruabarrena	6	7^{7}
8	(United States) Caroline Dolehide	4	6^{4}

==== Fourth qualifier ====
First round
4	(Australia) Lizette Cabrera	3	2
(Slovakia) Anna Karolína Schmiedlová	6	6
WC	(Mexico) Fernanda Contreras	0	2
7	(Russia) Varvara Flink	6	6

Qualifying competition
(Slovakia) Anna Karolína Schmiedlová	6	6
7	(Russia) Varvara Flink	2	2

==== Fifth qualifier ====
First round
5	(Slovenia) Kaja Juvan	4	7^{10}	1
(Argentina) Nadia Podoroska	6	6^{8}	6
(Chile) Daniela Seguel	3	2
12	(Italy) Elisabetta Cocciaretto	6	6

Qualifying competition
(Argentina) Nadia Podoroska	6^{1}	6	6
12	(Italy) Elisabetta Cocciaretto	7^{7}	2	1

==== Sixth qualifier ====
First round
6	(Australia) Astra Sharma	6	6
WC	(Mexico) Ana Karen Guadiana Campos	1	1
Alt	(Romania) Gabriela Talabă	2	6	4
11	(Italy) Giulia Gatto-Monticone	6	3	6

Qualifying competition
6	(Australia) Astra Sharma	3	2
11	(Italy) Giulia Gatto-Monticone	6	6
