= 2015 Wuhan Open – Singles =

Singles
- 2015 Wuhan Open

Final
- Champion: (United States) Venus Williams
- Runner-up: (Spain) Garbiñe Muguruza
- Score: 6–3, 3–0, ret.

Events
Singles	Doubles
- Wuhan Open

Venus Williams won the singles tennis title at the 2015 Wuhan Open after Garbiñe Muguruza retired in the final, with the scoreline at 6–3, 3–0. Williams saved a match point en route to the title, in the semifinals against Roberta Vinci.

Petra Kvitová was the defending champion, but lost to Vinci in the third round.

== Seeds ==
The top eight seeds received a bye into the second round.

1. (Romania) Simona Halep (third round)
2. (Russia) Maria Sharapova (second round, retired with left arm injury)
3. (Czech Republic) Petra Kvitová (third round)
4. (Denmark) Caroline Wozniacki (second round)
5. (Spain) Garbiñe Muguruza (final, retired)
6. (Germany) Angelique Kerber (semifinals)
7. (Spain) Carla Suárez Navarro (third round)
8. (Czech Republic) Karolína Plíšková (quarterfinals)

9. (Serbia) Ana Ivanovic (third round)
10. (Poland) Agnieszka Radwańska (first round)
11. (Switzerland) Belinda Bencic (second round, retired)
12. (Ukraine) Elina Svitolina (third round)
13. (Germany) Andrea Petkovic (first round)
14. (United States) Madison Keys (second round)
15. (Italy) Roberta Vinci (semifinals)
16. (Italy) Sara Errani (first round)

Click on the seed number of a player to go to their draw section.

== Draw ==
Key

- Q = Qualifier
- WC = Wild card
- LL = Lucky loser
- Alt = Alternate
- ITF = ITF entry
- PR = Protected ranking
- SR = Special ranking
- SE = Special exempt
- JE = Junior exempt
- JR = Junior Accelerator Programme entrant
- CO = College Accelerator Programme entrant
- NG = Next Gen Accelerator Program entrant
- w/o = Walkover
- r = Retired
- d = Defaulted

=== Finals ===
Quarterfinals
Q	(United Kingdom) Johanna Konta	4	6	5
(United States) Venus Williams	6	3	7
15	(Italy) Roberta Vinci	7^{7}	6
8	(Czech Republic) Karolína Plíšková	6^{2}	3
5	(Spain) Garbiñe Muguruza	6	6
(Slovakia) Anna Karolína Schmiedlová	2	2
6	(Germany) Angelique Kerber	6	3
(United States) CoCo Vandeweghe	1	1^{r}

Semifinals
(United States) Venus Williams	5	6	7^{7}
15	(Italy) Roberta Vinci	7	2	6^{4}
5	(Spain) Garbiñe Muguruza	6	7^{7}
6	(Germany) Angelique Kerber	4	6^{5}

Final
(United States) Venus Williams	6	3
5	(Spain) Garbiñe Muguruza	3	0^{r}

=== Top half ===
==== Section 1 ====
First round
(Russia) A Pavlyuchenkova	6	6
(Russia) S Kuznetsova	0	1
Q	(United States) L Davis	2	6^{4}
(Belarus) V Azarenka	6	7^{7}
Q	(United Kingdom) J Konta	6	7
13	(Germany) A Petkovic	4	5
10	(Poland) A Radwańska	1	6^{4}
(United States) V Williams	6	7^{7}
(France) A Cornet	3	3
Q	(Germany) J Görges	6	6
(Romania) M Niculescu	6	6
WC	(China) F Liu	1	1

Second round
1	(Romania) S Halep	6	6
(Russia) A Pavlyuchenkova	2	1
(Belarus) V Azarenka	4	0^{r}
Q	(United Kingdom) J Konta	6	1
(United States) V Williams	6	6
Q	(Germany) J Görges	4	3
(Romania) M Niculescu	7	3	4
7	(Spain) C Suárez Navarro	5	6	6

Third round
1	(Romania) S Halep	3	6	5
Q	(United Kingdom) J Konta	6	3	7
(United States) V Williams	6	6
7	(Spain) C Suárez Navarro	3	4

Quarterfinals
Q	(United Kingdom) J Konta	4	6	5
(United States) V Williams	6	3	7

==== Section 2 ====
First round
(Russia) D Gavrilova	6	7^{9}
(Brazil) T Pereira	2	6^{7}
(Kazakhstan) Z Diyas	6^{5}	6^{5}
(Romania) I-C Begu	7^{7}	7^{7}
Q	(Montenegro) D Kovinić	7	1	3
15	(Italy) R Vinci	5	6	6
12	(Ukraine) E Svitolina	6	6
WC	(Slovakia) D Hantuchová	4	4
(United States) V Lepchenko	6	6
WC	(China) S Zheng	4	0
(Australia) S Stosur	2	1
(Croatia) M Lučić-Baroni	6	6

Second round
3	(Czech Republic) P Kvitová	6	4	7
(Russia) D Gavrilova	3	6	5
(Romania) I-C Begu	4	3
15	(Italy) R Vinci	6	6
12	(Ukraine) E Svitolina	6	6
(United States) V Lepchenko	4	2
(Croatia) M Lučić-Baroni	6^{4}	7	6^{5}
8	(Czech Republic) Ka Plíšková	7^{7}	5	7^{7}

Third round
3	(Czech Republic) P Kvitová	6^{3}	2
15	(Italy) R Vinci	7^{7}	6
12	(Ukraine) E Svitolina	6	4	4
8	(Czech Republic) Ka Plíšková	2	6	6

Quarterfinals
15	(Italy) R Vinci	7^{7}	6
8	(Czech Republic) Ka Plíšková	6^{2}	3

=== Bottom half ===
==== Section 3 ====
First round
(United States) A Riske	6^{4}	3
(United States) S Stephens	7^{7}	6
(United States) M Brengle	6	6
PR	(Slovakia) D Cibulková	3	4
(Romania) A Dulgheru	1	3
9	(Serbia) A Ivanovic	6	6
14	(United States) M Keys	6	4	7^{7}
(Slovakia) M Rybáriková	2	6	6^{4}
Q	(Romania) PM Țig	1	4
(France) K Mladenovic	6	6
Q	(Colombia) M Duque Mariño	4	4
(Slovakia) AK Schmiedlová	6	6

Second round
5	(Spain) G Muguruza	6	6
(United States) S Stephens	2	0
(United States) M Brengle	0	3
9	(Serbia) A Ivanovic	6	6
14	(United States) M Keys	5	6	2
(France) K Mladenovic	7	1	6
(Slovakia) AK Schmiedlová	1	6	7^{8}
4	(Denmark) C Wozniacki	6	4	6^{6}

Third round
5	(Spain) G Muguruza	4	6	6
9	(Serbia) A Ivanovic	6	1	0
(France) K Mladenovic	4	2
(Slovakia) AK Schmiedlová	6	6

Quarterfinals
5	(Spain) G Muguruza	6	6
(Slovakia) AK Schmiedlová	2	2

==== Section 4 ====
First round
(Serbia) J Janković	6	2	6
Q	(United Kingdom) H Watson	3	6	3
(Bulgaria) T Pironkova	6	2	5
(Italy) C Giorgi	2	6	7
LL	(Croatia) A Tomljanović	5	5
11	(Switzerland) B Bencic	7	7
16	(Italy) S Errani	7^{7}	4	2
(France) C Garcia	6^{4}	6	6
(Ukraine) L Tsurenko	2	6	3
(United States) C Vandeweghe	6	2	6
(Czech Republic) B Strýcová	7^{11}	6
Q	(Hungary) T Babos	6^{9}	2

Second round
6	(Germany) A Kerber	6	2	6
(Serbia) J Janković	4	6	2
(Italy) C Giorgi	6	0
11	(Switzerland) B Bencic	2	0^{r}
(France) C Garcia	3	7^{7}	6^{6}
(United States) C Vandeweghe	6	6^{4}	7^{8}
(Czech Republic) B Strýcová	6^{1}	7^{7}	1
2/WC	(Russia) M Sharapova	7^{7}	6^{4}	2^{r}

Third round
6	(Germany) A Kerber	6	6
(Italy) C Giorgi	2	4
(United States) C Vandeweghe	3	6	7^{7}
(Czech Republic) B Strýcová	6	2	6^{3}

Quarterfinals
6	(Germany) A Kerber	6	3
(United States) C Vandeweghe	1	1^{r}

== Qualifying ==
=== Seeds ===
1. (Germany) Mona Barthel (first round)
2. (Czech Republic) Lucie Hradecká (first round)
3. (Croatia) Ajla Tomljanović (qualifying competition, lucky loser)
4. (Germany) Julia Görges (qualified)
5. (United Kingdom) Heather Watson (qualified)
6. (United States) Christina McHale (qualifying competition)
7. (United Kingdom) Johanna Konta (qualified)
8. (Poland) Magda Linette (qualifying competition)
9. (Belarus) Olga Govortsova (first round, retired)
10. (Croatia) Ana Konjuh (qualifying competition)
11. (United States) Irina Falconi (qualifying competition)
12. (United States) Lauren Davis (qualified)
13. (Montenegro) Danka Kovinić (qualified)
14. (Hungary) Tímea Babos (qualified)
15. (Kazakhstan) Yulia Putintseva (qualifying competition)
16. (Colombia) Mariana Duque Mariño (qualified)

=== Qualifiers ===
1. (Romania) Patricia Maria Țig
2. (Montenegro) Danka Kovinić
3. (Hungary) Tímea Babos
4. (Germany) Julia Görges
5. (United Kingdom) Heather Watson
6. (Colombia) Mariana Duque Mariño
7. (United Kingdom) Johanna Konta
8. (United States) Lauren Davis

=== Lucky loser ===
1. (Croatia) Ajla Tomljanović

=== Draw ===
==== First qualifier ====
First round
1	(Germany) Mona Barthel	4	2
(Romania) Patricia Maria Țig	6	6
WC	(China) Xu Yifan	2	7	0
9	(Belarus) Olga Govortsova	6	5	0^{r}

Qualifying competition
(Romania) Patricia Maria Țig	6	6
WC	(China) Xu Yifan	2	3

==== Second qualifier ====
First round
2	(Czech Republic) Lucie Hradecká	6^{5}	4
(China) Wang Yafan	7^{7}	6
WC	(China) Yang Zhaoxuan	6	2	0
13	(Montenegro) Danka Kovinić	1	6	6

Qualifying competition
(China) Wang Yafan	4	6^{4}
13	(Montenegro) Danka Kovinić	6	7^{7}

==== Third qualifier ====
First round
3	(Croatia) Ajla Tomljanović	6	3	6
(Italy) Francesca Schiavone	1	6	1
(Czech Republic) Andrea Hlaváčková	3	1
14	(Hungary) Tímea Babos	6	6

Qualifying competition
3	(Croatia) Ajla Tomljanović	6^{1}	7^{7}	2
14	(Hungary) Tímea Babos	7^{7}	6^{2}	6

==== Fourth qualifier ====
First round
4	(Germany) Julia Görges	6	7^{7}
(Bulgaria) Sesil Karatantcheva	2	6^{4}
WC	(China) Tang Yu	1	0
10	(Croatia) Ana Konjuh	6	6

Qualifying competition
4	(Germany) Julia Görges	3	6	6
10	(Croatia) Ana Konjuh	6	4	4

==== Fifth qualifier ====
First round
5	(United Kingdom) Heather Watson	6	7^{7}
(Australia) Jarmila Gajdošová	1	6^{4}
WC	(China) Liu Chang	1	2
15	(Kazakhstan) Yulia Putintseva	6	6

Qualifying competition
5	(United Kingdom) Heather Watson	6	6
15	(Kazakhstan) Yulia Putintseva	2	4

==== Sixth qualifier ====
First round
6	(United States) Christina McHale	6	6
(Russia) Alla Kudryavtseva	4	2
(Australia) Casey Dellacqua	7	6^{1}	3
16	(Colombia) Mariana Duque Mariño	5	7^{7}	6

Qualifying competition
6	(United States) Christina McHale	6	2	2
16	(Colombia) Mariana Duque Mariño	1	6	6

==== Seventh qualifier ====
First round
7	(United Kingdom) Johanna Konta	6	7^{7}
Alt	(Canada) Gabriela Dabrowski	2	6^{2}
(Puerto Rico) Monica Puig	2	7^{7}	3
11	(United States) Irina Falconi	6	6^{4}	6

Qualifying competition
7	(United Kingdom) Johanna Konta	6	6
11	(United States) Irina Falconi	2	1

==== Eighth qualifier ====
First round
8	(Poland) Magda Linette	6	6
(China) Duan Yingying	4	2
Alt	(China) Han Xinyun	7	6^{2}	5
12	(United States) Lauren Davis	5	7^{7}	7

Qualifying competition
8	(Poland) Magda Linette	4	6^{4}
12	(United States) Lauren Davis	6	7^{7}
