= Giuliana Olmos =

Mexican tennis player (born 1993)

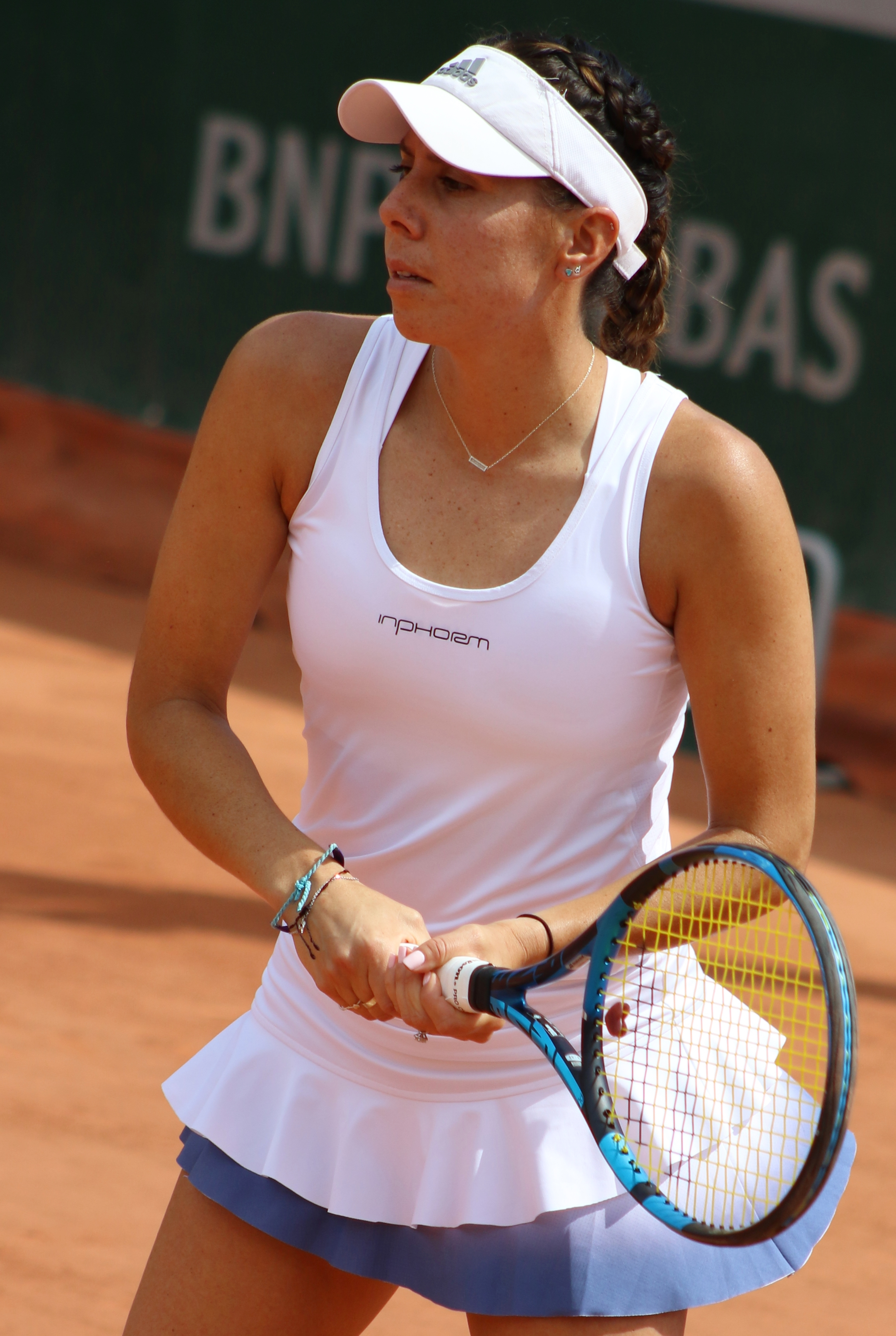
- Olmos at the 2021 French Open
- Full name: Giuliana Marion Olmos Dick
- Country (sports): Mexico
- Residence: Fremont, United States
- Born: 4 March 1993 (age 33) Schwarzach im Pongau, Austria
- Height: 1.70 m (5 ft 7 in)
- Turned pro: 2018
- Plays: Right (two-handed backhand)
- College: University of Southern California
- Coach: Dr. Dave Marshall
- Prize money: $2,125,947

Singles
- Career record: 138–93
- Career titles: 0 WTA, 4 ITF
- Highest ranking: No. 343 (4 March 2019)

Doubles
- Career record: 298–229
- Career titles: 7
- Highest ranking: No. 6 (10 April 2023)
- Current ranking: No. 37 (10 August 2026)

Grand Slam doubles results
- Australian Open: QF (2021)
- French Open: QF (2024)
- Wimbledon: QF (2026)
- US Open: QF (2022)

Other doubles tournaments
- Tour Finals: RR (2021, 2022)
- Olympic Games: 1R (2021)

Grand Slam mixed doubles results
- Australian Open: 2R (2022, 2023)
- French Open: SF (2021)
- Wimbledon: F (2024)
- US Open: F (2021)

Team competitions
- Fed Cup: 30–20
Medal record
Tennis
Representing Mexico
Central American and Caribbean Games
Gold medal – first place	2018 Barranquilla	Doubles
Silver medal – second place	2018 Barranquilla	Team
Bronze medal – third place	2018 Barranquilla	Singles
- Last updated on: 20 August 2026.

Giuliana Marion Olmos Dick (born 4 March 1993) is an Austrian-born Mexican professional tennis player. Olmos, a graduate of USC, has a career-high doubles ranking of world No. 6, achieved on 10 April 2023. She has won seven doubles titles on the WTA Tour. With her partner Desirae Krawczyk, she became the first Mexican player in the Open era to reach a WTA Tour final, at the 2018 Monterrey Open. In 2019, she became the first Mexican player to win a title on WTA Tour, taking the doubles crown at the Nottingham Open. In 2020, she became the first Mexican woman to win the Mexican Open, also with Krawczyk. And at last in 2022, she became the first Mexican woman to enter the top 10 in the WTA rankings in either singles or doubles. She has a best singles ranking of world No. 343, achieved on 4 March 2019, and has won four singles titles on the ITF Women's Circuit.

== Early life ==
Olmos is the daughter of a Mexican man and a Mexican-Austrian woman, who was born in the Austrian city of Schwarzach im Pongau, and moved to Fremont, California at the age of two. Along with her two younger sisters she was taken to events attended by Mexican sportswomen, like golfer Lorena Ochoa and tennis player Melissa Torres Sandoval. Olmos started playing tennis at the age of four, and decided she wanted to be a professional player at eleven. Holding citizenship for three countries, she played for the United States in junior and ITF tournaments and ranked second among American players until the age of 16, when she accepted an offer to represent Mexico, who would sponsor her, pay for travel expenses and give her a spot in the Junior Fed Cup and Fed Cup teams. While attending the University of Southern California, majoring in international relations and minoring in occupational therapy, Olmos took part in two editions of the Summer Universiade, in 2013 and 2015.

== Career ==
=== 2018–20: Breakthrough, maiden WTA Tour title in doubles ===
After graduating from the USC, where she learned she was a better doubles player, Olmos became the first Mexican player in the Open era to reach a WTA Tour final at the 2018 Monterrey Open, partnering Desirae Krawczyk. One year later, also alongside Krawczyk, Olmos was the first Mexican champion of a WTA Tour tournament at the 2019 Nottingham Open. In 2020, she also became the first Mexican woman to win the Mexican Open in Acapulco alongside Krawczyk.

=== 2021: WTA 1000 title, top 25 & WTA Finals debuts ===
In February, Olmos and Canadian player Sharon Fichman reached their first Grand Slam quarterfinal at the Australian Open, and in April she partnered with another Canadian, Gabriela Dabrowski, to reach the semifinals of another WTA-1000 tournament at the Miami Open.

In May, Olmos won the biggest title in her tennis career at the WTA 1000 Italian Open, partnering with Fichman; in the final, they defeated the pair of Kristina Mladenovic and Markéta Vondroušová who were making their debut playing together. They entered the tournament as alternates and defeated top seeds Hsieh/Mertens and the Japanese fourth-seeded duo Aoyama/Shibahara en route to the championship match. As a result, she entered the top 30 in doubles for the first time in her career.

Also in 2021, Olmos qualified for the 2020 Tokyo Olympics, partnering Renata Zarazúa, both making their Olympics debut, and being the first Mexican woman to play Olympic tennis since Angélica Gavaldón in 1996.

At the US Open, Olmos partnered Marcelo Arévalo in the mixed doubles draw and reached the final by defeating top seeds Nicole Melichar-Martinez and Ivan Dodig en route. They lost to second-seeded pair, Desirae Krawczyk and Joe Salisbury, in straight sets. Olmos became the first Mexican to reach a major final since Santiago González made the men's doubles final (with American Donald Young) at Roland Garros in 2017. Olmos and Fichman ended up playing the 2021 WTA Finals in front of her home crowd in Guadalajara.

=== 2022: New partnership & first WTA 1000 title with Dabrowski, historic top 10 ===
Olmos started to play the 2022 season with Dabrowski, with whom she had played the 2021 Miami Open. Seeded second, they went on to win their first Masters tournament together at the Madrid Open. As a result, she reached a new career-high doubles ranking of world No. 11, on 9 May 2022. Olmos and Dabrowski followed that by also reaching the final of the Italian Open.

She made the top 10 on 12 September 2022, at world No. 8, after reaching the quarterfinals at the US Open with Dabrowski, becoming the first ever Mexican woman to be ranked inside the WTA top 10 in either singles or doubles. At the Pan Pacific Open, she won her second team title with Dabrowski, without losing a single set. Following this run, she achieved another career-high of world No. 7, on 26 September 2022, and qualified for the 2022 WTA Finals with Dabrowski in their first appearance as a team.

=== 2023: World No. 6, fourth WTA 1000 final ===
At the Charleston Open, as the top seeded pair with Ena Shibahara, they finished runners-up. As a result, she reached a new career-high doubles ranking of world No. 6, on 10 April.

She also reached her fourth WTA 1000 final with Chan Hao-ching at the China Open.

=== 2024: Wimbledon mixed doubles final ===
Partnering with Chan Hao-ching, Olmos won the doubles title at the Hobart International in January.

She reached a second mixed doubles final at the 2024 Wimbledon Championships with compatriot Santiago González. They became the first Mexican duo to reach the mixed doubles final at Wimbledon. Olmos became the first Mexican woman since Yola Ramírez in 1959 to reach the semifinals, and the first in the Open Era to reach the final of the same event at the All England Club. However, they lost in straight sets to Jan Zieliński and Hsieh Su-wei.

Partnering with Alexandra Panova, Olmos was runner-up in the doubles at the Monterrey Open, losing to Guo Hanyu and Monica Niculescu in final.

=== 2025: Singapore title ===
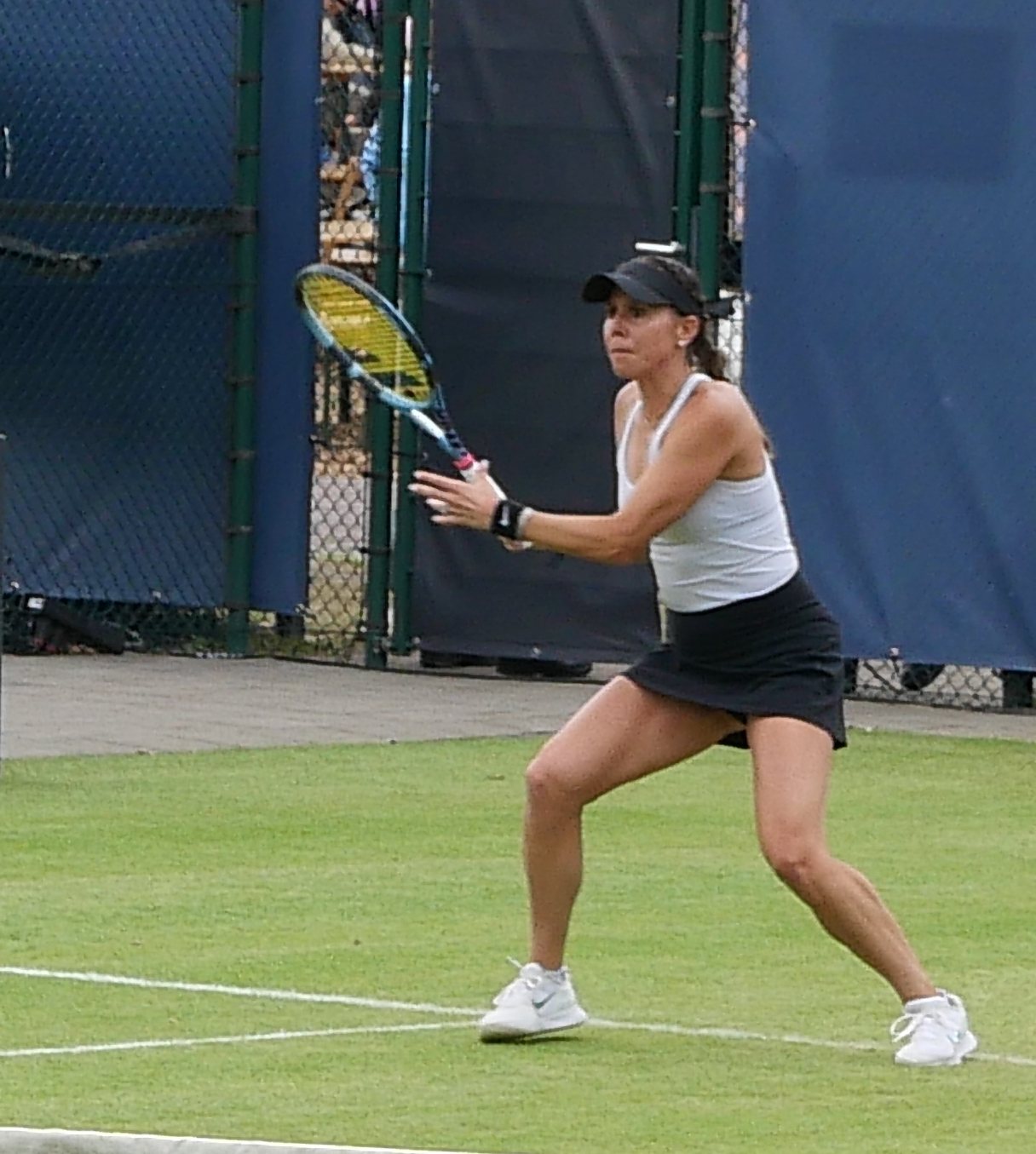
Olmos at the 2026 Libéma Open

Partnering Desirae Krawczyk, Olmos won the doubles title at the Singapore Open, defeating the pair of Wang Xinyu and Zheng Saisai in the final.

== Fed Cup/BJK Cup ==
Olmos has represented Mexico in the Fed Cup where she has a win–loss record of 30–20 (23–7 in doubles) as of May 2026. In 2022, she was selected as captain for the 2022 Billie Jean King Cup Americas Zone.

== Performance timeline ==
Key
W	F	SF	QF	#R	RR	Q#	P#	DNQ	A	Z#	PO	G	S	B	NMS	NTI	P	NH

(W) winner; (F) finalist; (SF) semifinalist; (QF) quarterfinalist; (#R) rounds 4, 3, 2, 1; (RR) round-robin stage; (Q#) qualification round; (P#) preliminary round; (DNQ) did not qualify; (A) absent; (Z#) Davis/Fed Cup Zonal Group (with number indication) or (PO) play-off; (G) gold, (S) silver or (B) bronze Olympic/Paralympic medal; (NMS) not a Masters tournament; (NTI) not a Tier I tournament; (P) postponed; (NH) not held; (SR) strike rate (events won / competed); (W–L) win–loss record.
To avoid confusion and double counting, these charts are updated at the conclusion of a tournament or when the player's participation has ended.

Only main-draw results in WTA Tour, Grand Slam tournaments, Fed Cup/Billie Jean King Cup and Olympic Games are included in win–loss records.

=== Doubles ===
Current through the 2024 French Open.

Tournament	2017	2018	2019	2020	2021	2022	2023	2024	2025	2026	SR	W–L	Win%
Grand Slam tournaments
Australian Open	A	A	A	A	QF	2R	3R	2R	1R	2R	0 / 6	8–6	57%
French Open	A	A	1R	2R	3R	3R	3R	QF	2R	1R	0 / 8	11–8	58%
Wimbledon	A	1R	2R	NH	3R	3R	1R	1R	1R	QF	0 / 8	8–8	50%
US Open	A	A	1R	1R	1R	QF	2R	2R	2R		0 / 7	6–7	46%
Win–loss	0–0	0–1	1–3	1–2	7–4	8–4	5–4	5–4	2–4	4–3	0 / 29	33-29	53%
Year-end championships
WTA Finals	DNQ			NH	RR	RR	DNQ				0 / 2	1–5	17%
National representation
Summer Olympics	NH				1R	NH		A	NH		0 / 1	0–1	0%
WTA 1000
Dubai / Qatar Open (Note: The first Premier 5 event of the year has switched back and forth between the Dubai Tennis Championships and the Qatar Ladies Open since 2009. Dubai was classified as a Premier 5 event from 2009 to 2011 before being succeeded by Doha for the 2012–2014 period. In 2015, Dubai regained its Premier 5 status while Doha was demoted to Premier status. The Premier 5 tournaments were reclassified as WTA 1000 tournaments in 2021.)	A	A	A	A	A	2R	2R	1R	2R	QF	0 / 5	3–5	38%
Indian Wells Open	A	A	A	NH	2R	SF	1R	1R	1R	1R	0 / 6	4–6	40%
Miami Open	A	A	A	NH	SF	2R	2R	1R	1R	1R	0 / 6	5–6	45%
Madrid Open	A	A	A	NH	2R	W	2R	2R	1R	1R	1 / 6	6–5	55%
Italian Open	A	A	A	1R	W	F	1R	QF	2R	2R	1 / 7	12–6	67%
Canadian Open	A	A	A	NH	A	SF	1R	QF	1R	2R	0 / 5	5–5	50%
Cincinnati Open	A	A	A	1R	A	QF	SF	1R	2R		0 / 5	6–5	55%
Guadalajara Open	NH					QF	1R	NMS	A		0 / 2	1–2	33%
Wuhan Open	A	A	A	NH				1R	QF		0 / 2	2–2	50%
China Open	A	A	A	NH			F	2R	2R		0 / 3	6–3	67%
Career statistics
Tournaments	3	11	12	9	20	23	13				Career total: 96		
Titles	0	0	1	1	1	2	0				Career total; 5		
Finals	0	1	3	1	2	4	3				Career total: 14		
Overall win–loss	3–6	10–11	17–12	12–9	25–19	39–22	21–13				5 / 96	128–96	57%
Year-end ranking	101	85	74	61	18	8	25				$1,038,831		

=== Mixed doubles ===
Tournament	2021	2022	2023	2024	2025	2026	SR	W–L	Win%
Australian Open	A	2R	2R	1R	1R	A	0 / 4	2–4	33%
French Open	SF	1R	2R	A	QF	1R	0 / 5	5–5	50%
Wimbledon	1R	1R	1R	F	1R	A	0 / 5	4–5	44%
US Open	F	1R	2R	2R	A		0 / 4	6–4	60%
Win–loss	6–2	1–4	3–4	5–3	2–3	0–1	0 / 18	17–18	49%

== Grand Slam tournament finals ==
=== Mixed doubles: 2 (runner-ups) ===
Result	Year	Tournament	Surface	Partner	Opponents	Score
Loss	2021	US Open	Hard	(El Salvador) Marcelo Arévalo	(United States) Desirae Krawczyk (United Kingdom) Joe Salisbury	5–7, 2–6
Loss	2024	Wimbledon	Grass	(Mexico) Santiago González	(Poland) Jan Zieliński (Chinese Taipei) Hsieh Su-wei	4–6, 2–6

== Other significant finals ==
=== WTA 1000 tournaments ===
==== Doubles: 4 (2 titles, 2 runner-ups) ====
Result	Year	Tournament	Surface	Partner	Opponents	Score
Win	2021	Italian Open	Clay	(Canada) Sharon Fichman	(France) Kristina Mladenovic (Czech Republic) Markéta Vondroušová	4–6, 7–5, [10–5]
Win	2022	Madrid Open	Clay	(Canada) Gabriela Dabrowski	(United States) Desirae Krawczyk (Netherlands) Demi Schuurs	7–6^{(7–1)}, 5–7, [10–7]
Loss	2022	Italian Open	Clay	(Canada) Gabriela Dabrowski	(Russia) Veronika Kudermetova (Russia) Anastasia Pavlyuchenkova	6–1, 4–6, [7–10]
Loss	2023	China Open	Hard	(Chinese Taipei) Chan Hao-ching	(Czech Republic) Marie Bouzková (Spain) Sara Sorribes Tormo	6–3, 0–6, [4–10]

== WTA Tour finals ==
=== Doubles: 20 (7 titles, 13 runner-ups) ===
Legend WTA 1000 (2–2) WTA 500 (1–5) WTA 250 (4–6)	Finals by surface Hard (4–8) Grass (1–1) Clay (2–4)

Result	W–L	Date	Tournament	Tier	Surface	Partner	Opponents	Score
Loss	0–1	Apr 2018	Monterrey Open, Mexico	International (Note: The WTA International tournaments were reclassified as WTA 250 tournaments in 2021.)	Hard	(United States) Desirae Krawczyk	(United Kingdom) Naomi Broady (Spain) Sara Sorribes Tormo	6–3, 4–6, [8–10]
Loss	0–2	Mar 2019	Abierto Mexicano, Mexico	International	Hard	(United States) Desirae Krawczyk	(Belarus) Victoria Azarenka (China) Zheng Saisai	1–6, 2–6
Win	1–2	Jun 2019	Nottingham Open, United Kingdom	International	Grass	(United States) Desirae Krawczyk	(Australia) Ellen Perez (Australia) Anastasia Rodionova	7–6^{(7–5)}, 7–5
Loss	1–3	Sep 2019	Guangzhou Open, China	International	Hard	(Chile) Alexa Guarachi	(China) Peng Shuai (Germany) Laura Siegemund	2–6, 1–6
Win	2–3	Feb 2020	Abierto Mexicano, Mexico	International	Hard	(United States) Desirae Krawczyk	(Ukraine) Kateryna Bondarenko (Canada) Sharon Fichman	6–3, 7–6^{(7–5)}
Loss	2–4	Mar 2021	Abierto Zapopan, Mexico	WTA 250	Hard	(United States) Desirae Krawczyk	(Australia) Ellen Perez (Australia) Astra Sharma	4–6, 4–6
Win	3–4	May 2021	Italian Open, Italy	WTA 1000	Clay	(Canada) Sharon Fichman	(France) Kristina Mladenovic (Czech Republic) Markéta Vondroušová	4–6, 7–5, [10–5]
Win	4–4	May 2022	Madrid Open, Spain	WTA 1000	Clay	(Canada) Gabriela Dabrowski	(United States) Desirae Krawczyk (Netherlands) Demi Schuurs	7–6^{(7–1)}, 5–7, [10–7]
Loss	4–5	May 2022	Italian Open, Italy	WTA 1000	Clay	(Canada) Gabriela Dabrowski	(Russia) Veronika Kudermetova (Russia) Anastasia Pavlyuchenkova	6–1, 4–6, [7–10]
Win	5–5	Sep 2022	Pan Pacific Open, Japan	WTA 500	Hard	(Canada) Gabriela Dabrowski	(United States) Nicole Melichar-Martinez (Australia) Ellen Perez	6–4, 6–4
Loss	5–6	Oct 2022	San Diego Open, United States	WTA 500	Hard	(Canada) Gabriela Dabrowski	(United States) Coco Gauff (United States) Jessica Pegula	6–1, 5–7, [4–10]
Loss	5–7	Apr 2023	Charleston Open, United States	WTA 500	Clay	(Japan) Ena Shibahara	(United States) Danielle Collins (United States) Desirae Krawczyk	6–0, 4–6, [12–14]
Loss	5–8	Apr 2023	Stuttgart Grand Prix, Germany	WTA 500	Clay (i)	(United States) Nicole Melichar-Martinez	(United States) Desirae Krawczyk (Netherlands) Demi Schuurs	4–6, 1–6
Loss	5–9	May 2023	Internationaux de Strasbourg, France	WTA 250	Clay	(United States) Desirae Krawczyk	(China) Xu Yifan (China) Yang Zhaoxuan	3–6, 2–6
Loss	5–10	Oct 2023	China Open, China	WTA 1000	Hard	(Chinese Taipei) Chan Hao-ching	(Spain) Sara Sorribes Tormo (Czech Republic) Marie Bouzková	6–3, 0–6, [4–10]
Win	6–10	Jan 2024	Hobart International, Australia	WTA 250	Hard	(Chinese Taipei) Chan Hao-ching	(China) Guo Hanyu (China) Jiang Xinyu	6–3, 6–3
Loss	6–11	Aug 2024	Monterrey Open, Mexico	WTA 500	Hard	(Russia) Alexandra Panova	(China) Guo Hanyu (Romania) Monica Niculescu	6–3, 3–6, [4–10]
Win	7–11	Feb 2025	Singapore Open, Singapore	WTA 250	Hard	(United States) Desirae Krawczyk	(China) Wang Xinyu (China) Zheng Saisai	7–5, 6–0
Loss	7–12	Sep 2025	Guadalajara Open, Mexico	WTA 500	Hard	(Indonesia) Aldila Sutjiadi	(United States) Nicole Melichar-Martinez; Irina Khromacheva	3–6, 4–6
Loss	7–13	Jun 2026	Rosmalen Open, Netherlands	WTA 250	Grass	(Estonia) Ingrid Neel	(Japan) Shuko Aoyama (Chinese Taipei) Liang En-shuo	2–6, 6–2, [7–10]

== WTA 125 finals ==
=== Doubles: 2 (2 runner-ups) ===
Result	W–L	Date	Tournament	Surface	Partner	Opponents	Score
Loss	0–1	Nov 2018	Houston Challenger, United States	Hard	(United States) Desirae Krawczyk	(United States) Maegan Manasse (United States) Jessica Pegula	6–1, 4–6, [8–10]
Loss	0–2	May 2023	Firenze Ladies Open, Italy	Clay	(United States) Asia Muhammad	(Germany) Vivian Heisen (Estonia) Ingrid Neel	6–1, 2–6, [8–10]

== ITF Circuit finals ==
=== Singles: 5 (4 titles, 1 runner-up) ===
Legend $10/15,000 tournaments (4–1)	Finals by surface Hard (4–1)

Result	W–L	Date	Tournament	Tier	Surface	Opponents	Score
Win	1–0	Jun 2015	ITF Manzanillo, Mexico	10,000	Hard	(Chile) Fernanda Brito	4–6, 7–6^{(5)}, 6–0
Win	2–0	Jun 2015	ITF Manzanillo, Mexico	10,000	Hard	(Italy) Gaia Sanesi	6–1, 6–2
Win	3–0	Jun 2015	ITF Manzanillo, Mexico	10,000	Hard	(Mexico) Nazari Urbina	5–7, 6–2, 7–5
Win	4–0	Jan 2017	ITF Fort-de-France, Martinique	15,000	Hard	(Czech Republic) Monika Kilnarová	7–5, 6–1
Loss	4–1	Jan 2017	ITF Petit-Bourg, Guadeloupe	15,000	Hard	(Japan) Mayo Hibi	3–6, 0–6

=== Doubles: 21 (11 titles, 10 runner-ups) ===
Legend $100,000 tournaments (1–3) $80,000 tournaments (1–2) $60,000 tournaments (2–1) $25,000 tournaments (5–2) $10/15,000 tournaments (2–2)	Finals by surface Hard (11–9) Clay (0–1)

Result	W–L	Date	Tournament	Tier	Surface	Partner	Opponents	Score
Loss	0–1	Jun 2015	ITF Manzanillo, Mexico	10,000	Hard	(Mexico) Constanza Gorches	(Mexico) Camila Fuentes (Dominican Republic) Francesca Segarelli	6–2, 4–6, [5–10]
Loss	0–2	Aug 2015	ITF Fort Worth, United States	10,000	Hard	(United States) Jessica Ho	(Mexico) Josie Kuhlman (United States) Maegan Manasse	4–6, 4–6
Loss	0–3	Oct 2016	ITF Stillwater, United States	25,000	Hard	(Mexico) Nazari Urbina	(United States) Ronit Yurovsky (United States) Emina Bektas	4–6, 7–6^{(6)}, [6–10]
Win	1–3	Jan 2017	ITF Fort-de-France, Martinique	15,000	Hard	(United States) Desirae Krawczyk	(France) Sara Cakarevic (France) Emmanuelle Salas	6–3, 6–2
Win	2–3	Jan 2017	ITF Saint Martin, Guadeloupe	15,000	Hard	(United States) Desirae Krawczyk	(Netherlands) Chayenne Ewijk (Netherlands) Rosalie van der Hoek	6–1, 6–1
Win	3–3	Apr 2017	ITF Irapuato, Mexico	25,000	Hard	(United States) Desirae Krawczyk	(United States) Ronit Yurovsky (Mexico) Marcela Zacarías	6–1, 6–0
Win	4–3	May 2017	ITF Incheon, South Korea	25,000	Hard	(United States) Desirae Krawczyk	(South Korea) Choi Ji-hee (South Korea) Kim Na-ri	6–3, 2–6, [10–8]
Win	5–3	Jun 2017	ITF Sumter, United States	25,000	Hard	(United States) Kaitlyn Christian	(Australia) Ellen Perez (Brazil) Luisa Stefani	6–2, 3–6, [10–7]
Win	6–3	Jul 2017	Sacramento Challenger, United States	60,000	Hard	(United States) Desirae Krawczyk	(Serbia) Jovana Jakšić (Belarus) Vera Lapko	6–1, 6–2
Win	7–3	Aug 2017	ITF Fort Worth, United States	25,000	Hard	(Australia) Ellen Perez	(Japan) Miharu Imanishi (Japan) Ayaka Okuno	6–4, 6–3
Loss	7–4	Aug 2017	Vancouver Open, Canada	100,000	Hard	(United States) Desirae Krawczyk	(Australia) Jessica Moore (United Kingdom) Jocelyn Rae	1–6, 5–7
Loss	7–5	Sep 2017	Abierto Tampico, Mexico	100,000	Hard	(United States) Kaitlyn Christian	(United States) Caroline Dolehide (Argentina) María Irigoyen	4–6, 4–6
Win	8–5	Oct 2017	ITF Templeton Pro, United States	60,000	Hard	(United States) Kaitlyn Christian	(Switzerland) Viktorija Golubic (Switzerland) Amra Sadiković	7–5, 6–3
Loss	8–6	Mar 2018	ITF Irapuato, Mexico	25,000	Hard	(United States) Desirae Krawczyk	(Chile) Alexa Guarachi (New Zealand) Erin Routliffe	6–4, 2–6, [6–10]
Win	9–6	May 2018	ITF Les Franqueses del Vallès, Spain	25,000	Hard	(Brazil) Laura Pigossi	(Romania) Raluca Șerban (India) Pranjala Yadlapalli	6–4, 6–4
Loss	9–7	Jul 2018	Budapest Pro Open, Hungary	W100	Clay	(United States) Kaitlyn Christian	(Romania) Alexandra Cadanțu (Slovakia) Chantal Škamlová	1–6, 3–6
Win	10–7	Aug 2018	Vancouver Open, Canada	W100	Hard	(United States) Desirae Krawczyk	(Ukraine) Kateryna Kozlova (Netherlands) Arantxa Rus	6–2, 7–5
Loss	10–8	Nov 2018	Tyler Pro Challenge, United States	W80	Hard	(United States) Desirae Krawczyk	(United States) Nicole Gibbs (United States) Asia Muhammad	6–3, 3–6, [12–14]
Win	11–8	Oct 2021	Tyler Pro Challenge, United States	W80	Hard	(Mexico) Marcela Zacarías	(Japan) Misaki Doi (Poland) Katarzyna Kawa	7–5, 1–6, [10–5]
Loss	11–9	Mar 2022	Arcadia Pro Open, United States	W60	Hard	(United Kingdom) Harriet Dart	(United States) Ashlyn Krueger (United States) Robin Montgomery	w/o
Loss	11–10	Oct 2022	Rancho Santa Fe Open, United States	W80	Hard	(Mexico) Marcela Zacarías	(United States) Elvina Kalieva (Poland) Katarzyna Kawa	1–6, 6–3, [2–10]

== Best Grand Slam results details ==
=== Doubles ===
	Australian Open			
2021 Australian Open
with (Canada) Sharon Fichman
Round	Opponents	Rank	Score	GOR
1R	(Chinese Taipei) Chan Hao-ching (5) (Chinese Taipei) Latisha Chan (5)	No. 16; No. 16	1–6, 7–6^{(7–1)}, 6–2	No. 61
2R	(Czech Republic) Lucie Hradecká (Czech Republic) Kristýna Plíšková	No. 35; No. 50	7–5, 6–3	No. 61
3R	(Canada) Leylah Fernandez (United Kingdom) Heather Watson	No. 230; No. 150	7–5, 6–3	No. 61
QF	(Czech Republic) Barbora Krejčíková (3) (Czech Republic) Kateřina Siniaková (3)	No. 7 No. 8	5–7, 7–5, 2–6	No. 61

	French Open			
2024 French Open
with Alexandra Panova
Round	Opponents	Rank	Score	GOR
1R	(Georgia (country)) Oksana Kalashnikova; Aliaksandra Sasnovich	No. 58; No. 70	6–4, 6–3	No. 32
2R	(United States) Asia Muhammad (15) (Indonesia) Aldila Sutjiadi (15)	No. 34; No. 35	7–6^{(7–4)}, 6–4	No. 32
3R	(Czech Republic) Barbora Krejčíková (4) (Germany) Laura Siegemund (4)	No. 27; No. 6	6–3, 1–6, 3–6	No. 32
QF	(United States) Caroline Dolehide (8) (United States) Desirae Krawczyk (8)	No. 23; No. 14	5–7, 6–4, 5–7	No. 32

	Wimbledon Championships			
2021 Wimbledon (9th seed)
with (Canada) Sharon Fichman
Round	Opponents	Rank	Score	GOR
1R	(Germany) Vivian Heisen (Czech Republic) Květa Peschke	No. 113; No. 19	6–2, 6–1	No. 26
2R	(Ukraine) Marta Kostyuk (Latvia) Jeļena Ostapenko	No. 126; No. 20	Walkover	No. 26
3R	(Serbia) Aleksandra Krunić (Serbia) Nina Stojanović	No. 57; No. 55	Withdrew	No. 26
2022 Wimbledon (3rd seed)
with (Canada) Gabriela Dabrowski
Round	Opponents	Rank	Score	GOR
1R	(Kazakhstan) Yulia Putintseva (PR) (Belgium) Yanina Wickmayer (PR)	No. 756; No. 686	6–7^{(2–7)}, 6–3, 6–2	No. 15
2R	(Ukraine) Marta Kostyuk (Czech Republic) Tereza Martincová	No. 47; No. 88	7–5, 3–6, 6–3	No. 15
3R	(United States) Danielle Collins (United States) Desirae Krawczyk	No. 328; No. 13	4–6, 3–6	No. 15

	US Open			
2022 US Open (5th seed)
with (Canada) Gabriela Dabrowski
Round	Opponents	Rank	Score	GOR
1R	(United States) Ashlyn Krueger (WC) (United States) Peyton Stearns (WC)	No. 190; No. 432	6–2, 6–1	No. 12
2R	(United States) Hailey Baptiste (WC) (United States) Whitney Osuigwe (WC)	No. 372; No. 306	6–1, 6–4	No. 12
3R	(United States) Asia Muhammad (9) (Japan) Ena Shibahara (9)	No. 33; No. 13	6–3, 3–6, 7–6^{(10–8)}	No. 12
QF	(Czech Republic) Barbora Krejčíková (3) (Czech Republic) Kateřina Siniaková (3)	No. 7 No. 3	3–6, 7–6^{(7–4)}, 3–6	No. 12

=== Mixed doubles ===
	Australian Open	
2022 Australian Open
with (El Salvador) Marcelo Arévalo
Round	Opponents	Score
1R	(United States) Desirae Krawczyk (1) (United Kingdom) Joe Salisbury (1)	6–7^{(7–9)}, 6–4, [10–5]
2R	(Czech Republic) Lucie Hradecká (Ecuador) Gonzalo Escobar	4–6, 4–6
2023 Australian Open (top seed)
with (El Salvador) Marcelo Arévalo
Round	Opponents	Score
1R	(Chinese Taipei) Latisha Chan (Monaco) Hugo Nys	6–2, 3–6, [10–6]
2R	(Latvia) Jeļena Ostapenko (Spain) David Vega Hernández	7–6^{(7–4)}, 6–7^{(6–7)}, [8–10]

	French Open	
2021 French Open (Note: The draw will feature only 16 pairs, rather than the usual 32.)
with (Colombia) Juan Sebastián Cabal
Round	Opponents	Score
1R	(United States) Bethanie Mattek-Sands (United Kingdom) Jamie Murray	7–6^{(7–4)}, 6–7^{(3–7)}, [10–6]
QF	(Czech Republic) Barbora Krejčíková (1) (Slovakia) Filip Polášek (1)	6–2, 5–7, [12–10]
SF	(United States) Desirae Krawczyk (United Kingdom) Joe Salisbury	Withdrew

	Wimbledon Championships	
2024 Wimbledon
with (Mexico) Santiago González
Round	Opponents	Score
1R	(United Kingdom) Freya Christie (WC) (United Kingdom) Luke Johnson (WC)	6–4, 6–0
2R	(United States) Asia Muhammad (Argentina) Andrés Molteni	7–6^{(7–5)}, 4–6, [10–8]
QF	(United Kingdom) Alicia Barnett (WC) (United Kingdom) Marcus Willis (WC)	6–3, 7–5
SF	(Norway) Ulrikke Eikeri (Argentina) Máximo González	6–3, 7–6^{(7–5)}
F	(Chinese Taipei) Hsieh Su-wei (7) (Poland) Jan Zieliński (7)	4–6, 2–6

	US Open	
2021 US Open
with (El Salvador) Marcelo Arévalo
Round	Opponents	Score
1R	(United States) Asia Muhammad (WC) (United States) Jackson Withrow (WC)	7–6^{(7–5)}, 6–3
2R	(United States) Nicole Melichar-Martinez (1) (Croatia) Ivan Dodig (1)	7–5, 3–6, [10–5]
QF	(Australia) Ellen Perez (Alt) (Brazil) Marcelo Demoliner (Alt)	3–6, 6–3, [10–4]
SF	(Ukraine) Dayana Yastremska (Alt) (Australia) Max Purcell (Alt)	4–6, 6–4, [10–6]
F	(United States) Desirae Krawczyk (2) (United Kingdom) Joe Salisbury (2)	5–7, 2–6
