= 2004 US Open – Men's singles qualifying =

Men's singles qualifying
- 2004 US Open

Events
Singles	men	women		boys	girls
Doubles	men	women	mixed	boys	girls
WC Singles	men	women	quad
WC Doubles	men	women	quad
Legends	men	women	mixed

Qualification
Singles	men	women
- US Open

This article displays the qualifying draw for the Men's Singles at the 2004 US Open.

== Seeds ==
1. (Czech Republic) Jan Hernych (first round)
2. (Luxembourg) Gilles Müller (first round)
3. (Italy) Potito Starace (qualified)
4. (Germany) Philipp Kohlschreiber (qualified)
5. (Belgium) Kristof Vliegen (qualifying competition, lucky loser)
6. (Chile) Adrián García (second round)
7. (Australia) Todd Reid (first round)
8. (Brazil) Ricardo Mello (qualified)
9. (Serbia and Montenegro) Janko Tipsarević (qualifying competition, lucky loser)
10. (Spain) Guillermo García-López (second round)
11. (France) Richard Gasquet (first round)
12. (Colombia) Alejandro Falla (second round)
13. (France) Nicolas Mahut (qualified)
14. (Czech Republic) Bohdan Ulihrach (first round)
15. (United States) Glenn Weiner (qualifying competition)
16. (Germany) Lars Burgsmüller (first round)
17. (Austria) Alexander Peya (qualified)
18. (Spain) Marc López (first round)
19. (Spain) Santiago Ventura (first round)
20. (Switzerland) Michel Kratochvil (first round)
21. (France) Julien Jeanpierre (first round)
22. (Germany) Dieter Kindlmann (second round)
23. (Czech Republic) Jan Vacek (qualifying competition)
24. (Switzerland) Ivo Heuberger (qualified)
25. (Israel) Harel Levy (first round)
26. (Czech Republic) Tomáš Zíb (qualified)
27. (Argentina) Franco Squillari (qualifying competition)
28. (Israel) Noam Okun (second round)
29. (Australia) Peter Luczak (first round)
30. (Croatia) Roko Karanušić (first round)
31. (Ecuador) Nicolás Lapentti (first round)
32. (Netherlands) Peter Wessels (qualifying competition)

== Qualifiers ==
1. (Cyprus) Marcos Baghdatis
2. (Thailand) Danai Udomchoke
3. (Italy) Potito Starace
4. (Germany) Philipp Kohlschreiber
5. (Switzerland) Ivo Heuberger
6. (Japan) Takao Suzuki
7. (Italy) Andreas Seppi
8. (Brazil) Ricardo Mello
9. (Austria) Alexander Peya
10. (Finland) Tuomas Ketola
11. (France) Jérôme Golmard
12. (United Kingdom) Alex Bogdanovic
13. (France) Nicolas Mahut
14. (Czech Republic) Michal Tabara
15. (United States) Paul Goldstein
16. (Czech Republic) Tomáš Zíb

== Lucky losers ==
1. (Belgium) Kristof Vliegen
2. (Serbia and Montenegro) Janko Tipsarević

== Qualifying draw ==
Key

- Q = Qualifier
- WC = Wild card
- LL = Lucky loser
- Alt = Alternate
- ITF = ITF entry
- PR = Protected ranking
- SR = Special ranking
- SE = Special exempt
- JE = Junior exempt
- JR = Junior Accelerator Programme entrant
- CO = College Accelerator Programme entrant
- NG = Next Gen Accelerator Program entrant
- w/o = Walkover
- r = Retired
- d = Defaulted

=== First qualifier ===
First round
1	(Czech Republic) Jan Hernych	5	6^{4}
(France) Marc Gicquel	7	7^{7}
(Argentina) Mariano Delfino	6	3
(Argentina) Diego Veronelli	1	0^{r}
(Argentina) Federico Browne	2	1
(Cyprus) Marcos Baghdatis	6	6
(United States) Jeff Salzenstein	6	5	7^{7}
18	(Spain) Marc López	1	7	6^{4}

Second round
(France) Marc Gicquel	6	6
(Argentina) Mariano Delfino	3	3
(Cyprus) Marcos Baghdatis	6	5	6
(United States) Jeff Salzenstein	0	7	3

Qualifying competition
(France) Marc Gicquel	6	0	3
(Cyprus) Marcos Baghdatis	4	6	6

=== Second qualifier ===
First round
2	(Luxembourg) Gilles Müller	6	6^{5}	2
(Thailand) Danai Udomchoke	1	7^{7}	6
(United States) Andres Pedroso	3	0
(Canada) Frank Dancevic	6	6
WC	(United States) Donald Young	3	2
(Italy) Federico Luzzi	6	6
(Serbia and Montenegro) Dušan Vemić	6	4	0
23	(Czech Republic) Jan Vacek	2	6	6

Second round
(Thailand) Danai Udomchoke	5	7^{7}	6
(Canada) Frank Dancevic	7	6^{3}	4
(Italy) Federico Luzzi	0	3
23	(Czech Republic) Jan Vacek	6	6

Qualifying competition
(Thailand) Danai Udomchoke	6	7
23	(Czech Republic) Jan Vacek	4	5

=== Third qualifier ===
First round
3	(Italy) Potito Starace	7	6^{4}	6
(France) Gilles Simon	5	7^{7}	3
(Netherlands) Fred Hemmes	6	6
(United Kingdom) Jonathan Marray	4	2
(France) Florent Serra	7^{7}	7^{8}
(Italy) Massimo Dell'Acqua	6^{2}	6^{6}
(Czech Republic) Tomáš Cakl	7^{7}	7^{7}
25	(Israel) Harel Levy	6^{2}	6^{2}

Second round
3	(Italy) Potito Starace	6	6
(Netherlands) Fred Hemmes	3	4
(France) Florent Serra	5	6	7^{7}
(Czech Republic) Tomáš Cakl	7	4	6^{3}

Qualifying competition
3	(Italy) Potito Starace	6	6
(France) Florent Serra	4	3

=== Fourth qualifier ===
First round
4	(Germany) Philipp Kohlschreiber	6	6
WC	(United States) Phillip Simmonds	3	2
(Belgium) Dick Norman	1	4
(Austria) Julian Knowle	6	6
WC	(United States) Todd Widom	3	4
(Azerbaijan) Emin Ağayev	6	6
(Chinese Taipei) Jimmy Wang	6^{4}	1
28	(Israel) Noam Okun	7^{7}	6

Second round
4	(Germany) Philipp Kohlschreiber	6	6
(Austria) Julian Knowle	2	1
(Azerbaijan) Emin Ağayev	6^{4}	6	7^{7}
28	(Israel) Noam Okun	7^{7}	4	6^{2}

Qualifying competition
4	(Germany) Philipp Kohlschreiber	6	6
(Azerbaijan) Emin Ağayev	2	1

=== Fifth qualifier ===
First round
5	(Belgium) Kristof Vliegen	1	7^{7}	6
(Sweden) Jacob Adaktusson	6	6^{5}	4
(Greece) Konstantinos Economidis	6	6
(Czech Republic) Jaroslav Pospíšil	2	4
(United States) Brian Vahaly	6	7
(Italy) Andrea Stoppini	4	5
(United States) Eric Taino	3	2
24	(Switzerland) Ivo Heuberger	6	6

Second round
5	(Belgium) Kristof Vliegen	6^{6}	6	6
(Greece) Konstantinos Economidis	7^{8}	3	3
(United States) Brian Vahaly	3	6^{3}
24	(Switzerland) Ivo Heuberger	6	7^{7}

Qualifying competition
5	(Belgium) Kristof Vliegen	2	5
24	(Switzerland) Ivo Heuberger	6	7

=== Sixth qualifier ===
First round
6	(Chile) Adrián García	6	6
(Czech Republic) Ivo Minář	4	3
WC	(United States) Brendan Evans	6	6^{7}	6
(France) Édouard Roger-Vasselin	3	7^{9}	1
(Mexico) Santiago González	3	3
(Japan) Takao Suzuki	6	6
(Switzerland) Stan Wawrinka	6	4
20	(Switzerland) Michel Kratochvil	4	0^{r}

Second round
6	(Chile) Adrián García	6^{2}	6	2
WC	(United States) Brendan Evans	7^{7}	3	6
(Japan) Takao Suzuki	6	6
(Switzerland) Stan Wawrinka	4	2

Qualifying competition
WC	(United States) Brendan Evans	1	2
(Japan) Takao Suzuki	6	6

=== Seventh qualifier ===
First round
7	(Australia) Todd Reid	2	2
(Brazil) André Sá	6	6
(Czech Republic) Petr Kralert	2	7	4
(Italy) Uros Vico	6	5	6
(Italy) Andreas Seppi	6	7^{7}
(Russia) Igor Kunitsyn	3	6^{4}
(Argentina) Juan Pablo Guzmán	6	7^{7}
21	(France) Julien Jeanpierre	4	6^{5}

Second round
(Brazil) André Sá	4	6^{3}
(Italy) Uros Vico	6	7^{7}
(Italy) Andreas Seppi	6	6
(Argentina) Juan Pablo Guzmán	4	1

Qualifying competition
(Italy) Uros Vico	7	4	2
(Italy) Andreas Seppi	5	6	6

=== Eighth qualifier ===
First round
8	(Brazil) Ricardo Mello	6	6
(Paraguay) Ramón Delgado	4	2
(Bulgaria) Todor Enev	6	3	3
(South Africa) Wesley Whitehouse	4	6	6
(Argentina) Nicolás Todero	6	7
(Argentina) Sergio Roitman	3	5
WC	(Australia) Chris Guccione	7^{7}	7
19	(Spain) Santiago Ventura	6^{5}	5

Second round
8	(Brazil) Ricardo Mello	6	6
(South Africa) Wesley Whitehouse	2	2
(Argentina) Nicolás Todero	6^{1}	6^{2}
WC	(Australia) Chris Guccione	7^{7}	7^{7}

Qualifying competition
8	(Brazil) Ricardo Mello	7^{7}	6
WC	(Australia) Chris Guccione	6^{5}	4

=== Ninth qualifier ===
First round
9	(Serbia and Montenegro) Janko Tipsarević	6	6
WC	(United States) Nikita Kryvonos	2	4
(Spain) Salvador Navarro	5
(Canada) Simon Larose	0^{r}
(United Kingdom) Arvind Parmar	6	7^{7}
(Brazil) Bruno Soares	3	6^{5}
WC	(United States) Lesley Joseph	3	4
17	(Austria) Alexander Peya	6	6

Second round
9	(Serbia and Montenegro) Janko Tipsarević	7^{7}	6
(Spain) Salvador Navarro	6^{3}	2
(United Kingdom) Arvind Parmar	4	6^{2}
17	(Austria) Alexander Peya	6	7^{7}

Qualifying competition
9	(Serbia and Montenegro) Janko Tipsarević	1	4
17	(Austria) Alexander Peya	6	6

=== Tenth qualifier ===
First round
10	(Spain) Guillermo García-López	6	6
WC	(United States) Alex Kuznetsov	2	3
PR	(United States) Justin Gimelstob	3	6	5
(Finland) Tuomas Ketola	6	3	7
(Italy) Daniele Bracciali	2	2
(United States) Cecil Mamiit	6	6
(Italy) Vincenzo Santopadre	4	6^{3}
32	(Netherlands) Peter Wessels	6	7^{7}

Second round
10	(Spain) Guillermo García-López	3	6	3
(Finland) Tuomas Ketola	6	3	6
(United States) Cecil Mamiit	6^{3}	6^{2}
32	(Netherlands) Peter Wessels	7^{7}	7^{7}

Qualifying competition
(Finland) Tuomas Ketola	6	1	7^{8}
32	(Netherlands) Peter Wessels	3	6	6^{6}

=== Eleventh qualifier ===
First round
11	(France) Richard Gasquet	7	1^{d}
(United States) Michael Russell	5	4
(France) Jean-Michel Pequery	6	4	7^{7}
(Switzerland) Marco Chiudinelli	2	6	6^{3}
(France) Jo-Wilfried Tsonga	4	6	6
(Mexico) Alejandro Hernández	6	2	3
PR	(France) Jérôme Golmard	7	4	6
29	(Australia) Peter Luczak	5	6	4

Second round
(United States) Michael Russell	6	6
(France) Jean-Michel Pequery	3	1
(France) Jo-Wilfried Tsonga	4	4
PR	(France) Jérôme Golmard	6	6

Qualifying competition
(United States) Michael Russell	3	2
PR	(France) Jérôme Golmard	6	6

=== Twelfth qualifier ===
First round
12	(Colombia) Alejandro Falla	2	6	6
PR	(Australia) Paul Baccanello	6	4	3
(United Kingdom) Jamie Delgado	6^{2}	4
PR	(France) Julien Varlet	7^{7}	6
(Czech Republic) Jiří Vaněk	4	7^{7}	7^{7}
(Germany) Björn Phau	6	6^{4}	6^{4}
(United Kingdom) Alex Bogdanovic	6	6
30	(Croatia) Roko Karanušić	3	4

Second round
12	(Colombia) Alejandro Falla	3	6	4
PR	(France) Julien Varlet	6	3	6
(Czech Republic) Jiří Vaněk	3	5
(United Kingdom) Alex Bogdanovic	6	7

Qualifying competition
PR	(France) Julien Varlet	2	2
(United Kingdom) Alex Bogdanovic	6	6

=== Thirteenth qualifier ===
First round
13	(France) Nicolas Mahut	6	6
(United States) Robert Kendrick	4	4
(Croatia) Lovro Zovko	4	1
(United States) Matías Boeker	6	6
(France) Jean-Christophe Faurel	6	6
(Canada) Frédéric Niemeyer	4	4
(United States) Hugo Armando	6	6^{6}	3
27	(Argentina) Franco Squillari	2	7^{8}	6

Second round
13	(France) Nicolas Mahut	6	6
(United States) Matías Boeker	2	3
(France) Jean-Christophe Faurel	3	7	6^{5}
27	(Argentina) Franco Squillari	6	5	7^{7}

Qualifying competition
13	(France) Nicolas Mahut	6	6
27	(Argentina) Franco Squillari	4	4

=== Fourteenth qualifier ===
First round
14	(Czech Republic) Bohdan Ulihrach	4	3
(Germany) Michael Berrer	6	6
WC	(United States) Scott Oudsema	5	4
(Chile) Hermes Gamonal	7	6
(Czech Republic) Michal Tabara	6	7
(Slovakia) Viktor Bruthans	1	5
(Switzerland) Jean-Claude Scherrer	3	4
22	(Germany) Dieter Kindlmann	6	6

Second round
(Germany) Michael Berrer	6	6
(Chile) Hermes Gamonal	3	4
(Czech Republic) Michal Tabara	6	6
22	(Germany) Dieter Kindlmann	2	2

Qualifying competition
(Germany) Michael Berrer	2	5
(Czech Republic) Michal Tabara	6	7

=== Fifteenth qualifier ===
First round
15	(United States) Glenn Weiner	7^{7}	2	7
(Argentina) Ignacio González King	6^{5}	6	5
(Romania) Răzvan Sabău	6	6
(Spain) Iván Navarro	4	4
(Argentina) Carlos Berlocq	6^{6}	1
(United States) Paul Goldstein	7^{8}	6
(Peru) Iván Miranda	6	6
31	(Ecuador) Nicolás Lapentti	4	4

Second round
15	(United States) Glenn Weiner	6	6
(Romania) Răzvan Sabău	3	3
(United States) Paul Goldstein	6	6
(Peru) Iván Miranda	3	3

Qualifying competition
15	(United States) Glenn Weiner	3	2
(United States) Paul Goldstein	6	6

=== Sixteenth qualifier ===
First round
16	(Germany) Lars Burgsmüller	3	0
(Austria) Daniel Köllerer	6	6
(South Africa) Rik de Voest	6^{4}	6	0
(Pakistan) Aisam-ul-Haq Qureshi	7^{7}	2	6
(Sweden) Filip Prpic	5	7	6^{4}
(Sweden) Björn Rehnquist	7	5	7^{7}
(South Africa) Wesley Moodie	3	6	4
26	(Czech Republic) Tomáš Zíb	6	3	6

Second round
(Austria) Daniel Köllerer	6	6
(Pakistan) Aisam-ul-Haq Qureshi	4	3
(Sweden) Björn Rehnquist	6	3	0
26	(Czech Republic) Tomáš Zíb	4	6	6

Qualifying competition
(Austria) Daniel Köllerer	0	1
26	(Czech Republic) Tomáš Zíb	6	6
