= 2004 US Open – Women's singles qualifying =

Women's singles qualifying
- 2004 US Open

Events
Singles	men	women		boys	girls
Doubles	men	women	mixed	boys	girls
WC Singles	men	women	quad
WC Doubles	men	women	quad
Legends	men	women	mixed

Qualification
Singles	men	women
- US Open

== Seeds ==
1. (Germany) Anna-Lena Grönefeld (qualified)
2. (China) Peng Shuai (first round)
3. (Spain) Nuria Llagostera Vives (qualifying competition, lucky loser)
4. (France) Séverine Beltrame (qualified)
5. (Ukraine) Yuliana Fedak (second round)
6. (Italy) Roberta Vinci (qualified)
7. (France) Camille Pin (qualifying competition, lucky loser)
8. (Poland) Marta Domachowska (qualifying competition)
9. (France) Stéphanie Foretz (qualified)
10. (Sweden) Sofia Arvidsson (first round)
11. (Italy) Antonella Serra Zanetti (qualified)
12. (Czech Republic) Zuzana Ondrášková (first round)
13. (Russia) Evgenia Linetskaya (qualified)
14. (Argentina) Mariana Díaz Oliva (second round)
15. (Luxembourg) Anne Kremer (second round)
16. (Tunisia) Selima Sfar (first round)
17. (Bosnia and Herzegovina) Mervana Jugić-Salkić (qualifying competition)
18. (Ukraine) Yuliya Beygelzimer (second round)
19. (Czech Republic) Nicole Vaidišová (qualified)
20. (Czech Republic) Lenka Němečková (first round)
21. (United States) Lilia Osterloh (second round)
22. (United States) Samantha Reeves (first round)
23. (Russia) Lioudmila Skavronskaia (second round)
24. (Czech Republic) Eva Birnerová (qualifying competition)
25. (Israel) Tzipi Obziler (qualified)
26. (Ukraine) Alona Bondarenko (qualifying competition)
27. (Spain) Conchita Martínez Granados (first round)
28. (Germany) Julia Schruff (qualified)
29. (Puerto Rico) Vilmarie Castellvi (qualifying competition)
30. (Indonesia) Angelique Widjaja (qualified)
31. (France) Virginie Pichet (first round)
32. (Czech Republic) Michaela Paštiková (first round)

== Players advancing to the main draw ==
=== Qualifiers ===
1. (Germany) Anna-Lena Grönefeld
2. (China) Liu Nannan
3. (Czech Republic) Nicole Vaidišová
4. (France) Séverine Beltrame
5. (Canada) Maureen Drake
6. (Italy) Roberta Vinci
7. (Germany) Julia Schruff
8. (Israel) Tzipi Obziler
9. (France) Stéphanie Foretz
10. (Indonesia) Angelique Widjaja
11. (Italy) Antonella Serra Zanetti
12. (Bulgaria) Sessil Karatantcheva
13. (Russia) Evgenia Linetskaya
14. (United States) Abigail Spears
15. (United States) Shikha Uberoi
16. (Russia) Anna Chakvetadze

=== Lucky losers ===
1. (Spain) Nuria Llagostera Vives
2. (France) Camille Pin

== Results ==
Key

- Q = Qualifier
- WC = Wild card
- LL = Lucky loser
- Alt = Alternate
- ITF = ITF entry
- PR = Protected ranking
- SR = Special ranking
- SE = Special exempt
- JE = Junior exempt
- JR = Junior Accelerator Programme entrant
- CO = College Accelerator Programme entrant
- NG = Next Gen Accelerator Program entrant
- w/o = Walkover
- r = Retired
- d = Defaulted

=== First qualifier ===
First round
1	(Germany) Anna-Lena Grönefeld	6	6
(Germany) Adriana Barna	0	2
(Croatia) Sanda Mamić	6^{2}	6	6
(Czech Republic) Květa Peschke	7	2	4
(Netherlands) Elise Tamaëla	6	6
(United States) Meilen Tu	1	2
(Russia) Goulnara Fattakhetdinova	1	1
26	(Ukraine) Alona Bondarenko	6	6

Second round
1	(Germany) Anna-Lena Grönefeld	1	7	6
(Croatia) Sanda Mamić	6	5	3
(Netherlands) Elise Tamaëla	6	2	3
26	(Ukraine) Alona Bondarenko	2	6	6

Qualifying competition
1	(Germany) Anna-Lena Grönefeld	6	6
26	(Ukraine) Alona Bondarenko	3	3

=== Second qualifier ===
First round
2	(China) Peng Shuai	6	4	3
(Russia) Anastasia Rodionova	1	6	6
(Bulgaria) Desislava Topalova	6	1	6
(Spain) Paula García	1	6	4
(China) Liu Nannan	6	6
(Spain) Cristina Torrens Valero	1	0
(Germany) Stephanie Gehrlein	4	6	6
20	(Czech Republic) Lenka Němečková	6	4	0

Second round
(Russia) Anastasia Rodionova	3	1^{r}
(Bulgaria) Desislava Topalova	6	5
(China) Liu Nannan	6	6
(Germany) Stephanie Gehrlein	1	3

Qualifying competition
(Bulgaria) Desislava Topalova	6^{5}	4
(China) Liu Nannan	7	6

=== Third qualifier ===
First round
3	(Spain) Nuria Llagostera Vives	6	7
(Canada) Marie-Ève Pelletier	3	5
(Germany) Angelika Rösch	2	3
(Slovakia) Stanislava Hrozenská	6	6
(Russia) Galina Voskoboeva	6	6
(Germany) Vanessa Henke	4	4
(Australia) Christina Wheeler	1	3
19	(Czech Republic) Nicole Vaidišová	6	6

Second round
3	(Spain) Nuria Llagostera Vives	6	6
(Slovakia) Stanislava Hrozenská	1	2
(Russia) Galina Voskoboeva	1	0
19	(Czech Republic) Nicole Vaidišová	6	6

Qualifying competition
3	(Spain) Nuria Llagostera Vives	4	5
19	(Czech Republic) Nicole Vaidišová	6	7

=== Fourth qualifier ===
First round
4	(France) Séverine Beltrame	6	7
(China) Xie Yanze	1	6^{3}
(Germany) Barbara Rittner	4	6	6
WC	(United States) Sarah Fansler	6	3	0
(Romania) Delia Sescioreanu	6	2
(Argentina) Natalia Gussoni	1	0^{r}
(Ukraine) Olga Lazarchuk	4	6	6
27	(Spain) Conchita Martínez Granados	6	4	4

Second round
4	(France) Séverine Beltrame	6	6
(Germany) Barbara Rittner	1	3
(Romania) Delia Sescioreanu	7	6
(Ukraine) Olga Lazarchuk	6^{2}	1

Qualifying competition
4	(France) Séverine Beltrame	6^{7}	6	6
(Romania) Delia Sescioreanu	7	3	0

=== Fifth qualifier ===
First round
5	(Ukraine) Yuliana Fedak	5	7	6
(Netherlands) Anousjka van Exel	7	6^{4}	1
(Slovakia) Janette Husárová	0	6	3
(Spain) Laura Pous Tió	6	3	6
(Czech Republic) Olga Blahotová	3	7	6
(United States) Ansley Cargill	6	5	3
(Canada) Maureen Drake	6	5	6
31	(France) Virginie Pichet	1	7	4

Second round
5	(Ukraine) Yuliana Fedak	3	5
(Spain) Laura Pous Tió	6	7
(Czech Republic) Olga Blahotová	2	2
(Canada) Maureen Drake	6	6

Qualifying competition
(Spain) Laura Pous Tió	1	6^{5}
(Canada) Maureen Drake	6	7

=== Sixth qualifier ===
First round
6	(Italy) Roberta Vinci	6	6
(Paraguay) Rossana de los Ríos	3	3
WC	(United States) Jessica Nguyen	2	4
(Czech Republic) Lucie Šafářová	6	6
WC	(United States) Alexa Glatch	6	6
(Japan) Miho Saeki	4	2
(Hungary) Kyra Nagy	4	6	3
17	(Bosnia and Herzegovina) Mervana Jugić-Salkić	6	4	6

Second round
6	(Italy) Roberta Vinci	6	7
(Czech Republic) Lucie Šafářová	3	6^{6}
WC	(United States) Alexa Glatch	3	0
17	(Bosnia and Herzegovina) Mervana Jugić-Salkić	6	6

Qualifying competition
6	(Italy) Roberta Vinci	4	6	6
17	(Bosnia and Herzegovina) Mervana Jugić-Salkić	6	3	1

=== Seventh qualifier ===
First round
7	(France) Camille Pin	6	6
WC	(United States) Vania King	4	1
(Sweden) Åsa Svensson	6^{13}	5
(Brazil) Maria Fernanda Alves	7	7
PR	(France) Karolina Jagieniak	0	2
(Japan) Shiho Hisamatsu	6	6
(Hungary) Rita Kuti-Kis	4	0
28	(Germany) Julia Schruff	6	6

Second round
7	(France) Camille Pin	7	6
(Brazil) Maria Fernanda Alves	6^{1}	0
(Japan) Shiho Hisamatsu	0	4
28	(Germany) Julia Schruff	6	6

Qualifying competition
7	(France) Camille Pin	6^{6}	6	2
28	(Germany) Julia Schruff	7	2	6

=== Eighth qualifier ===
First round
8	(Poland) Marta Domachowska	6	6
WC	(United States) Andrea Remynse	0	4
(Hungary) Virág Németh	7	3	6^{3}
(Croatia) Lana Popadić	5	6	7
(Belarus) Tatiana Poutchek	4	3
(Australia) Evie Dominikovic	6	6
(Slovakia) Jarmila Gajdošová	4	1
25	(Israel) Tzipi Obziler	6	6

Second round
8	(Poland) Marta Domachowska	6	6
(Croatia) Lana Popadić	0	3
(Australia) Evie Dominikovic	6^{1}	1
25	(Israel) Tzipi Obziler	7	6

Qualifying competition
8	(Poland) Marta Domachowska	5	4
25	(Israel) Tzipi Obziler	7	6

=== Ninth qualifier ===
First round
9	(France) Stéphanie Foretz	6	6
(Czech Republic) Libuše Průšová	2	3
(Italy) Nathalie Viérin	6	6
(United States) Kristen Schlukebir	0	3
(Austria) Sybille Bammer	3	6	7
(Hungary) Zsófia Gubacsi	6	4	6^{6}
(Serbia and Montenegro) Ana Ivanovic	6	4	5
23	(Russia) Lioudmila Skavronskaia	1	6	7

Second round
9	(France) Stéphanie Foretz	4	7	6
(Italy) Nathalie Viérin	6	6^{4}	4
(Austria) Sybille Bammer	6	6
23	(Russia) Lioudmila Skavronskaia	1	4

Qualifying competition
9	(France) Stéphanie Foretz	1	6	6
(Austria) Sybille Bammer	6	1	3

=== Tenth qualifier ===
First round
10	(Sweden) Sofia Arvidsson	3	3
(Germany) Angelika Bachmann	6	6
(United States) Jewel Peterson	7	7
(Germany) Sandra Klösel	5	5
(Slovakia) Eva Fislová	4	4
(United Kingdom) Elena Baltacha	6	6
(Thailand) Suchanun Viratprasert	4	6	3
30	(Indonesia) Angelique Widjaja	6	4	6

Second round
(Germany) Angelika Bachmann	7	6
(United States) Jewel Peterson	6^{4}	3
(United Kingdom) Elena Baltacha	1	1
30	(Indonesia) Angelique Widjaja	6	6

Qualifying competition
(Germany) Angelika Bachmann	4	1
30	(Indonesia) Angelique Widjaja	6	6

=== Eleventh qualifier ===
First round
11	(Italy) Antonella Serra Zanetti	6	6
(South Korea) Jeon Mi-ra	2	0
(Israel) Shahar Pe'er	7	5	7
(Japan) Aiko Nakamura	5	7	5
(Estonia) Maret Ani	6	6
(Sweden) Hanna Nooni	3	4
(France) Capucine Rousseau	6	6
32	(Czech Republic) Michaela Paštiková	3	1

Second round
11	(Italy) Antonella Serra Zanetti	6	6
(Israel) Shahar Pe'er	2	4
(Estonia) Maret Ani	4	3
(France) Capucine Rousseau	6	6

Qualifying competition
11	(Italy) Antonella Serra Zanetti	6	6
(France) Capucine Rousseau	1	1

=== Twelfth qualifier ===
First round
12	(Czech Republic) Zuzana Ondrášková	4	2
WC	(United States) Alexandra Mueller	6	6
(Bulgaria) Sessil Karatantcheva	6	6
PR	(Spain) Ainhoa Goñi Blanco	1	0
(Serbia and Montenegro) Ana Timotić	6	7
(Spain) Lourdes Domínguez Lino	1	5
(Italy) Adriana Serra Zanetti	6	4	3
24	(Czech Republic) Eva Birnerová	1	6	6

Second round
WC	(United States) Alexandra Mueller	6^{2}	6	5
(Bulgaria) Sessil Karatantcheva	7	4	7
(Serbia and Montenegro) Ana Timotić	0	0
24	(Czech Republic) Eva Birnerová	6	6

Qualifying competition
(Bulgaria) Sessil Karatantcheva	3	6	6
24	(Czech Republic) Eva Birnerová	6	3	4

=== Thirteenth qualifier ===
First round
13	(Russia) Evgenia Linetskaya	6	6
(Ukraine) Mariya Koryttseva	4	3
(Germany) Martina Müller	4	6	1
(Japan) Yuka Yoshida	6	2	6
WC	(United States) Sunitha Rao	6	6
(South Africa) Natalie Grandin	3	2
(Austria) Patricia Wartusch	6	6
22	(United States) Samantha Reeves	3	2

Second round
13	(Russia) Evgenia Linetskaya	6	6
(Japan) Yuka Yoshida	4	1
WC	(United States) Sunitha Rao	3	1
(Austria) Patricia Wartusch	6	6

Qualifying competition
13	(Russia) Evgenia Linetskaya	6	6
(Austria) Patricia Wartusch	4	3

=== Fourteenth qualifier ===
First round
14	(Argentina) Mariana Díaz Oliva	6	6
(Romania) Edina Gallovits	2	2
(United States) Abigail Spears	7	6
(Slovakia) Zuzana Kučová	6^{3}	4
(Republic of Ireland) Kelly Liggan	2	6^{5}
(Slovakia) Dominika Nociarová	6	7
(Bulgaria) Lubomira Bacheva	3	3
21	(United States) Lilia Osterloh	6	6

Second round
14	(Argentina) Mariana Díaz Oliva	5	2
(United States) Abigail Spears	7	6
(Slovakia) Dominika Nociarová	6	6
21	(United States) Lilia Osterloh	1	4

Qualifying competition
(United States) Abigail Spears	6	6
(Slovakia) Dominika Nociarová	3	1

=== Fifteenth qualifier ===
First round
15	(Luxembourg) Anne Kremer	6	6
(Italy) Alice Canepa	1	2
WC	(United States) Shikha Uberoi	6	6
(Croatia) Ivana Abramović	1	2
(United Kingdom) Jane O'Donoghue	6^{4}	6^{4}
(Argentina) Vanina García Sokol	7	7
(Czech Republic) Kateřina Böhmová	5	5
29	(Puerto Rico) Vilmarie Castellvi	7	7

Second round
15	(Luxembourg) Anne Kremer	4	6^{7}
WC	(United States) Shikha Uberoi	6	7
(Argentina) Vanina García Sokol	6	5	0
29	(Puerto Rico) Vilmarie Castellvi	1	7	6

Qualifying competition
WC	(United States) Shikha Uberoi	6	6
29	(Puerto Rico) Vilmarie Castellvi	4	2

=== Sixteenth qualifier ===
First round
16	(Tunisia) Selima Sfar	5	7	3
(Japan) Rika Fujiwara	7	6^{5}	6
WC	(United States) Neha Uberoi	4	7	4
(United States) Cory Ann Avants	6	6^{4}	6
(Russia) Anna Chakvetadze	6	6
(Ukraine) Elena Tatarkova	1	3
(United States) Jessica Lehnhoff	3	4
18	(Ukraine) Yuliya Beygelzimer	6	6

Second round
(Japan) Rika Fujiwara	6	1	6
(United States) Cory Ann Avants	3	6	5^{r}
(Russia) Anna Chakvetadze	6	6
18	(Ukraine) Yuliya Beygelzimer	4	3

Qualifying competition
(Japan) Rika Fujiwara	6^{5}	2
(Russia) Anna Chakvetadze	7	6
