= 2005 NASDAQ-100 Open – Women's singles =

Women's singles
- 2005 NASDAQ-100 Open

Final
- Champion: (Belgium) Kim Clijsters
- Runner-up: (Russia) Maria Sharapova
- Score: 6–3, 7–5

Details
- Draw: 96 (8WC/12Q/1LL)
- Seeds: 32

Events
Singles	men	women
Doubles	men	women
- Miami Open

Kim Clijsters defeated Maria Sharapova in the final, 6–3, 7–5 to win the women's singles tennis title at the 2005 Miami Open. She did not lose a set during the tournament, and became the second woman to achieve the Sunshine Double (after Steffi Graf). At the time, Clijsters was the lowest-ranked player to win the title, doing so as the world No. 38.

Serena Williams was the three-time defending champion, but lost in the quarterfinals to her sister, Venus Williams.

== Seeds ==
All seeds received a bye into the second round.

1. (France) Amélie Mauresmo (semifinals)
2. (Russia) Maria Sharapova (final)
3. (United States) Serena Williams (quarterfinals)
4. (Russia) Elena Dementieva (quarterfinals)
5. (Russia) Anastasia Myskina (fourth round)
6. (Russia) Svetlana Kuznetsova (fourth round)
7. (Australia) Alicia Molik (fourth round)
8. (United States) Venus Williams (semifinals)
9. (Russia) Vera Zvonareva (second round)
10. (Russia) Nadia Petrova (second round)
11. (Switzerland) Patty Schnyder (third round)
12. (France) Nathalie Dechy (third round)
13. (Russia) Elena Bovina (third round)
14. (Italy) Francesca Schiavone (third round)
15. (Russia) Elena Likhovtseva (fourth round)
16. (Croatia) Karolina Šprem (fourth round)
17. (Argentina) Paola Suárez (second round)
18. (Serbia and Montenegro) Jelena Janković (second round)
19. (Belgium) Justine Henin-Hardenne (quarterfinals)
20. (Slovakia) Daniela Hantuchová (second round)
21. (Japan) Ai Sugiyama (third round)
22. (France) Tatiana Golovin (fourth round)
23. (Japan) Shinobu Asagoe (fourth round)
24. (United States) Amy Frazier (second round)
25. (Colombia) Fabiola Zuluaga (third round)
26. (Italy) Flavia Pennetta (third round)
27. (Bulgaria) Magdalena Maleeva (third round)
28. (France) Marion Bartoli (second round)
29. (Argentina) Gisela Dulko (third round)
30. (Israel) Anna Smashnova (third round)
31. (Russia) Dinara Safina (second round)
32. (Czech Republic) Klára Koukalová (second round)

== Draw ==
Key

- Q = Qualifier
- WC = Wild card
- LL = Lucky loser
- Alt = Alternate
- ITF = ITF entry
- PR = Protected ranking
- SR = Special ranking
- SE = Special exempt
- JE = Junior exempt
- JR = Junior Accelerator Programme entrant
- CO = College Accelerator Programme entrant
- NG = Next Gen Accelerator Program entrant
- w/o = Walkover
- r = Retired
- d = Defaulted

=== Finals ===
Quarterfinals
1	(France) Amélie Mauresmo	6	6
(Serbia and Montenegro) Ana Ivanovic	1	4
4	(Russia) Elena Dementieva	2	1
(Belgium) Kim Clijsters	6	6
8	(United States) Venus Williams	6	7^{10}
3	(United States) Serena Williams	1	6^{8}
19	(Belgium) Justine Henin-Hardenne	1	7^{8}	2
2	(Russia) Maria Sharapova	6	6^{6}	6

Semifinals
1	(France) Amélie Mauresmo	1	0
(Belgium) Kim Clijsters	6	6
8	(United States) Venus Williams	4	3
2	(Russia) Maria Sharapova	6	6

Final
(Belgium) Kim Clijsters	6	7
2	(Russia) Maria Sharapova	3	5

=== Top half ===
==== Section 1 ====
First round
(Russia) A Chakvetadze	5	3
(Russia) M Kirilenko	7	6
WC	(United States) J Kirkland	2	2
(Japan) A Morigami	6	6
(Czech Republic) B Strýcová	6	4	3
LL	(France) S Cohen-Aloro	3	6	6
(Spain) A Parra Santonja	6	0	6
WC	(Georgia (country)) A Tatishvili	3	6	2

Second round
1	(France) A Mauresmo	4	6	6
(Russia) M Kirilenko	6	4	1
(Japan) A Morigami	5	4
30	(Israel) A Smashnova	7	6
20	(Slovakia) D Hantuchová	6^{3}	2
LL	(France) S Cohen-Aloro	7	6
(Spain) A Parra Santonja	3	6	4
16	(Croatia) K Šprem	6	1	6

Third round
1	(France) A Mauresmo	6	6
30	(Israel) A Smashnova	2	1
LL	(France) S Cohen-Aloro	2	2
16	(Croatia) K Šprem	6	6

Fourth round
1	(France) A Mauresmo	6	7
16	(Croatia) K Šprem	1	5

==== Section 2 ====
First round
(Serbia and Montenegro) A Ivanovic	6	7
Q	(United States) L Granville	3	5
(Slovenia) K Srebotnik	5	1
(Czech Republic) N Vaidišová	7	6
(Madagascar) D Randriantefy	6	6
Q	(United States) J Peterson	4	3
WC	(United States) N Uberoi	4	2
Q	(Russia) G Voskoboeva	6	6

Second round
10	(Russia) N Petrova	4	5
(Serbia and Montenegro) A Ivanovic	6	7
(Czech Republic) N Vaidišová	6	7
18	(Serbia and Montenegro) J Janković	2	6^{6}
32	(Czech Republic) K Koukalová	2	1
(Madagascar) D Randriantefy	6	6
Q	(Russia) G Voskoboeva	1	3
8	(Russia) S Kuznetsova	6	6

Third round
(Serbia and Montenegro) A Ivanovic	6	7
(Czech Republic) N Vaidišová	2	6^{4}
(Madagascar) D Randriantefy	1	3
8	(Russia) S Kuznetsova	6	6

Fourth round
(Serbia and Montenegro) A Ivanovic	6	3	7
8	(Russia) S Kuznetsova	3	6	5

==== Section 3 ====
First round
(Slovakia) M Suchá	1	4
(Russia) E Linetskaya	6	6
WC	(Ukraine) V Kutuzova	3	5
(Spain) V Ruano Pascual	6	7
WC	(United States) A Haynes	6	7
Q	(Argentina) M Díaz Oliva	3	6^{5}
(Ukraine) T Perebiynis	6	2	6
(Spain) M Marrero	3	6	3

Second round
4	(Russia) E Dementieva	6	2	6
(Russia) E Linetskaya	3	6	4
(Spain) V Ruano Pascual	4	6	5
27	(Bulgaria) M Maleeva	6	3	7
22	(France) T Golovin	6	6^{8}	6
WC	(United States) A Haynes	0	7	3
(Ukraine) T Perebiynis	3	2
13	(Russia) E Bovina	6	6

Third round
4	(Russia) E Dementieva	6	6
27	(Bulgaria) M Maleeva	3	4
22	(France) T Golovin	6	7
13	(Russia) E Bovina	3	6^{4}

Fourth round
4	(Russia) E Dementieva	3	6	6
22	(France) T Golovin	6	2	1

==== Section 4 ====
First round
(United States) M Washington	4	2
(United States) L Raymond	6	6
Q	(Germany) S Kloesel	0	1
(Belgium) K Clijsters	6	6
WC	(India) S Mirza	2	5
(Spain) M Sánchez Lorenzo	6	7
(Venezuela) M Vento-Kabchi	6	6
(Luxembourg) C Schaul	3	1

Second round
12	(France) N Dechy	6	6
(United States) L Raymond	4	2
(Belgium) K Clijsters	6	6
24	(United States) A Frazier	2	3
26	(Italy) F Pennetta	6	6
(Spain) M Sánchez Lorenzo	3	3
(Venezuela) M Vento-Kabchi	2	1
5	(Russia) A Myskina	6	6

Third round
12	(France) N Dechy	0	2
(Belgium) K Clijsters	6	6
26	(Italy) F Pennetta	4	0
5	(Russia) A Myskina	6	6

Fourth round
(Belgium) K Clijsters	6	6
5	(Russia) A Myskina	3	4

=== Bottom half ===
==== Section 5 ====
First round
(Germany) A-L Grönefeld	6	6
Q	(Germany) J Schruff	4	2
(Spain) A Medina Garrigues	6	4
(Germany) M Weingärtner	1	3	r
Q	(Colombia) C Castaño	6	6
Q	(France) S Foretz	1	3
(Czech Republic) K Peschke	6	6
WC	(Bulgaria) S Karatantcheva	3	1

Second round
8	(United States) V Williams	6	6
(Germany) A-L Grönefeld	2	0
(Spain) A Medina Garrigues	5	1
25	(Colombia) F Zuluaga	7	6
17	(Argentina) P Suárez	5	3
Q	(Colombia) C Castaño	7	6
(Czech Republic) K Peschke	4	1
11	(Switzerland) P Schnyder	6	6

Third round
8	(United States) V Williams	6	6
25	(Colombia) F Zuluaga	2	0
Q	(Colombia) C Castaño	6	2	6
11	(Switzerland) P Schnyder	3	6	1

Fourth round
8	(United States) V Williams	6	2	6
Q	(Colombia) C Castaño	4	6	1

==== Section 6 ====
First round
(Czech Republic) I Benešová	4	6	2
(Czech Republic) D Chládková	6	4	6
(France) V Razzano	6	3	2
(United States) J Craybas	4	6	6
Q	(Israel) S Pe'er	6	2	7
(Poland) M Domachowska	2	6	5
(Russia) V Dushevina	6	6
(France) É Loit	3	3

Second round
15	(Russia) E Likhovtseva	7	6
(Czech Republic) D Chládková	6^{4}	2
(United States) J Craybas	5	4
21	(Japan) A Sugiyama	7	6
28	(France) M Bartoli	6	4	5
Q	(Israel) S Pe'er	2	6	7
(Russia) V Dushevina	3	0
3	(United States) S Williams	6	6

Third round
15	(Russia) E Likhovtseva	6	3	6
21	(Japan) A Sugiyama	4	6	3
Q	(Israel) S Pe'er	3	3
3	(United States) S Williams	6	6

Fourth round
15	(Russia) E Likhovtseva	4	6	4
3	(United States) S Williams	6	1	6

==== Section 7 ====
First round
(Thailand) T Tanasugarn	3	2
(Australia) N Pratt	6	6
(Puerto Rico) K Brandi	6	6
WC	(United States) J Jackson	3	2
(Australia) S Stosur	6^{5}	6	1
(United States) A Spears	7	4	6
(United States) L Lee-Waters	2	0
(Spain) N Llagostera Vives	6	6

Second round
7	(Australia) A Molik	6	6
(Australia) N Pratt	2	3
(Puerto Rico) K Brandi	6	0	3
29	(Argentina) G Dulko	4	6	6
19	(Belgium) J Henin-Hardenne	6	6
(United States) A Spears	4	3
(Spain) N Llagostera Vives	3	6	6
9	(Russia) V Zvonareva	6	3	1

Third round
7	(Australia) A Molik	3	6	6
29	(Argentina) G Dulko	6	3	4
19	(Belgium) J Henin-Hardenne	6	6
(Spain) N Llagostera Vives	3	2

Fourth round
7	(Australia) A Molik	4	6	2
19	(Belgium) J Henin-Hardenne	6	2	6

==== Section 8 ====
First round
(United States) M Shaughnessy	6	6
Q	(Ukraine) Y Fedak	3	0
Q	(Ukraine) A Bondarenko	2	0
(Russia) A Jidkova	6	6
(United States) M Irvin	6	7
Q	(Spain) M Serna	3	5
(Greece) E Daniilidou	6	4	6
(Italy) T Garbin	3	6	1

Second round
14	(Italy) F Schiavone	7	4	6
(United States) M Shaughnessy	6^{5}	6	6^{2}
(Russia) A Jidkova	7	4	6^{4}
23	(Japan) S Asagoe	6^{5}	6	7
31	(Russia) D Safina	6^{4}	6	4
(United States) M Irvin	7	0	6
(Greece) E Daniilidou	0	4
2	(Russia) M Sharapova	6	6

Third round
14	(Italy) F Schiavone	0	3
23	(Japan) S Asagoe	6	6
(United States) M Irvin	2	0
2	(Russia) M Sharapova	6	6

Fourth round
23	(Japan) S Asagoe	1	2
2	(Russia) M Sharapova	6	6

== Qualifying ==
=== Seeds ===
1. (Ukraine) Yuliana Fedak (qualified)
2. (United States) Laura Granville (qualified)
3. (Ukraine) Alona Bondarenko (qualified)
4. (France) Séverine Beltrame (first round)
5. (Argentina) Mariana Díaz Oliva (qualified)
6. (France) Stéphanie Cohen-Aloro (qualifying competition, Lucky loser)
7. (Luxembourg) Anne Kremer (first round)
8. (France) Stéphanie Foretz (qualified)
9. (Italy) Antonella Serra Zanetti (first round)
10. (United States) Lilia Osterloh (first round)
11. (Japan) Aiko Nakamura (qualifying competition)
12. (Hungary) ~~Petra Mandula~~ (moved to Main Draw)
13. (Croatia) Sanda Mamić (first round)
14. (Croatia) Silvija Talaja (qualifying competition)
15. (Czech Republic) Michaela Paštiková (first round)
16. (Switzerland) Emmanuelle Gagliardi (qualifying competition)
17. (Australia) Evie Dominikovic (qualifying competition)
18. (Colombia) Catalina Castaño (qualified)
19. (Slovakia) Ľubomíra Kurhajcová (first round)
20. (France) Camille Pin (first round)
21. (South Korea) Cho Yoon-jeong (first round)
22. (Tunisia) Selima Sfar (first round)
23. (Germany) Julia Schruff (qualified)
24. (Israel) Tzipora Obziler (first round)
25. (United Kingdom) Elena Baltacha (qualifying competition)

=== Qualifiers ===
1. (Ukraine) Yuliana Fedak
2. (United States) Laura Granville
3. (Ukraine) Alona Bondarenko
4. (Germany) Julia Schruff
5. (Argentina) Mariana Díaz Oliva
6. (Spain) Magüi Serna
7. (United States) Jewel Peterson
8. (France) Stéphanie Foretz
9. (Israel) Shahar Pe'er
10. (Colombia) Catalina Castaño
11. (Russia) Galina Voskoboeva
12. (Germany) Sandra Klösel

=== Lucky loser ===
1. (France) Stéphanie Cohen-Aloro

=== Qualifying draw ===
==== First qualifier ====
First round					Qualifying competition
1	(Ukraine) Yuliana Fedak	6	3	7^{7}
	(Spain) Laura Pous Tió	2	6	6^{2}	1	(Ukraine) Yuliana Fedak	3	6	6
	(United States) Kelly McCain	6^{6}	6	3	17	(Australia) Evie Dominikovic	6	4	3
17	(Australia) Evie Dominikovic	7^{8}	4	6

==== Second qualifier ====
First round				Qualifying competition
2	(United States) Laura Granville	6	6
	(Venezuela) Milagros Sequera	0	0	2	(United States) Laura Granville	7^{7}	3	6
WC	(United States) Ahsha Rolle	1	5	16	(Switzerland) Emmanuelle Gagliardi	6^{4}	6	0
16	(Switzerland) Emmanuelle Gagliardi	6	7

==== Third qualifier ====
First round				Qualifying competition
3	(Ukraine) Alona Bondarenko	6	6
	(Netherlands) Seda Noorlander	0	1	3	(Ukraine) Alona Bondarenko	6	3	6
	(United States) Jennifer Hopkins	6	6		(United States) Jennifer Hopkins	4	6	1
20	(France) Camille Pin	2	1

==== Fourth qualifier ====
First round					Qualifying competition
4	(France) Séverine Beltrame	3	2
WC	(Russia) Alisa Kleybanova	6	6		WC	(Russia) Alisa Kleybanova	1	3
WC	(Canada) Aleksandra Wozniak	2	6	0	23	(Germany) Julia Schruff	6	6
23	(Germany) Julia Schruff	6	0	6

==== Fifth qualifier ====
First round					Qualifying competition
5	(Argentina) Mariana Díaz Oliva	6	6
WC	(United States) Alexandra Mueller	4	4		5	(Argentina) Mariana Díaz Oliva	6	6^{4}	6
	(Belarus) Anastasiya Yakimova	7^{7}	2	6		(Belarus) Anastasiya Yakimova	3	7^{7}	3
13	(Croatia) Sanda Mamić	6^{2}	6	4

==== Sixth qualifier ====
First round				Qualifying competition
6	(France) Stéphanie Cohen-Aloro	6	6
WC	(Czech Republic) Dája Bedáňová	3	4	6	(France) Stéphanie Cohen-Aloro	4	3
	(Spain) Magüi Serna	7	6		(Spain) Magüi Serna	6	6
24	(Israel) Tzipora Obziler	5	4

==== Seventh qualifier ====
First round				Qualifying competition
7	(Luxembourg) Anne Kremer	4	3
	(Argentina) María Emilia Salerni	6	6		(Argentina) María Emilia Salerni	4	3
WC	(United States) Jewel Peterson	6	6	WC	(United States) Jewel Peterson	6	6
15	(Czech Republic) Michaela Paštiková	3	4

==== Eighth qualifier ====
First round				Qualifying competition
8	(France) Stéphanie Foretz	6	6
Alt	(Romania) Delia Sescioreanu	1	1	8	(France) Stéphanie Foretz	6	6
	(Czech Republic) Kateřina Böhmová	6	6		(Czech Republic) Kateřina Böhmová	2	3
22	(Tunisia) Selima Sfar	4	1

==== Ninth qualifier ====
First round				Qualifying competition
9	(Italy) Antonella Serra Zanetti	3	1
	(Israel) Shahar Pe'er	6	6		(Israel) Shahar Pe'er	6	6
	(Hungary) Melinda Czink	0	3	14	(Croatia) Silvija Talaja	1	1
14	(Croatia) Silvija Talaja	6	6

==== Tenth qualifier ====
First round				Qualifying competition
10	(United States) Lilia Osterloh	0	3
	(Czech Republic) Zuzana Ondrášková	6	6		(Czech Republic) Zuzana Ondrášková	4	2
	(Canada) Marie-Ève Pelletier	3	5	18	(Colombia) Catalina Castaño	6	6
18	(Colombia) Catalina Castaño	6	7

==== Eleventh qualifier ====
First round					Qualifying competition
11	(Japan) Aiko Nakamura	6	6
	(India) Shikha Uberoi	1	2		11	(Japan) Aiko Nakamura	1	3
	(Russia) Galina Voskoboeva	7^{7}	1	6		(Russia) Galina Voskoboeva	6	6
21	(South Korea) Cho Yoon-jeong	6^{4}	6	3

==== Twelfth qualifier ====
First round					Qualifying competition
25	(United Kingdom) Elena Baltacha	6	6
	(Czech Republic) Alena Vašková	4	3		25	(United Kingdom) Elena Baltacha	2	0
	(Germany) Sandra Klösel	6^{5}	6	6		(Germany) Sandra Klösel	6	6
19	(Slovakia) Ľubomíra Kurhajcová	7^{7}	1	2
