= 2003 Pacific Life Open – Women's singles =

Women's singles
- 2003 Pacific Life Open

Final
- Champion: (Belgium) Kim Clijsters
- Runner-up: (United States) Lindsay Davenport
- Score: 6–4, 7–5

Details
- Draw: 96 (8WC/12Q)
- Seeds: 32

Events
| Singles | men | women |
| Doubles | men | women |
- Indian Wells Masters

Kim Clijsters defeated Lindsay Davenport in the final, 6–4, 7–5 to win the women's singles tennis title at the 2003 Indian Wells Masters.

Daniela Hantuchová was the defending champion, but lost in the fourth round to Amanda Coetzer.

== Seeds ==
A champion seed is indicated in bold text while text in italics indicates the round in which that seed was eliminated. All thirty-two seeds received a bye to the second round.

1. (Belgium) **Kim Clijsters (champion)**
2. (United States) Jennifer Capriati (semifinals)
3. (Slovakia) Daniela Hantuchová (fourth round)
4. (United States) Lindsay Davenport (final)
5. (France) Amélie Mauresmo (quarterfinals)
6. (Federal Republic of Yugoslavia) Jelena Dokić (second round)
7. (Russia) Anastasia Myskina (second round)
8. (United States) Chanda Rubin (quarterfinals)
9. (Switzerland) Patty Schnyder (second round)
10. (Bulgaria) Magdalena Maleeva (third round)
11. (Israel) Anna Pistolesi (second round)
12. (Greece) Eleni Daniilidou (third round)
13. (Russia) Elena Bovina (fourth round)
14. (Russia) Elena Dementieva (fourth round)
15. (France) Nathalie Dechy (fourth round)
16. (South Africa) Amanda Coetzer (quarterfinals)
17. (Italy) Silvia Farina Elia (third round)
18. (United States) Lisa Raymond (third round)
19. (Russia) Tatiana Panova (second round)
20. (Argentina) Paola Suárez (second round)
21. (Japan) Ai Sugiyama (fourth round)
22. (United States) Alexandra Stevenson (second round)
23. (United States) Meghann Shaughnessy (fourth round)
24. (Argentina) Clarisa Fernández (second round)
25. (Russia) Elena Likhovtseva (third round)
26. (Spain) Conchita Martínez (semifinals)
27. (Slovenia) Katarina Srebotnik (third round)
28. (Croatia) Iva Majoli (second round)
29. (Thailand) Tamarine Tanasugarn (third round)
30. (United States) Laura Granville (second round)
31. (Italy) Francesca Schiavone (third round)
32. (Slovakia) Janette Husárová (second round)

== Draw ==
Key

- Q = Qualifier
- WC = Wild card
- LL = Lucky loser
- Alt = Alternate
- ITF = ITF entry
- PR = Protected ranking
- SR = Special ranking
- SE = Special exempt
- JE = Junior exempt
- JR = Junior Accelerator Programme entrant
- CO = College Accelerator Programme entrant
- NG = Next Gen Accelerator Program entrant
- w/o = Walkover
- r = Retired
- d = Defaulted

=== Finals ===
Quarterfinals
1 | (Belgium) Kim Clijsters | 6 | 6
8 | (United States) Chanda Rubin | 2 | 3
16 | (South Africa) Amanda Coetzer | 2 | 1
26 | (Spain) Conchita Martínez | 6 | 6
5 | (France) Amélie Mauresmo
4 | (United States) Lindsay Davenport | w/o
(Russia) Vera Zvonareva | 5 | 2
2 | (United States) Jennifer Capriati | 7 | 6

Semifinals
1 | (Belgium) Kim Clijsters | 6 | 6
26 | (Spain) Conchita Martínez | 3 | 2
4 | (United States) Lindsay Davenport | 6 | 4 | 6
2 | (United States) Jennifer Capriati | 4 | 6 | 4

Final
1 | (Belgium) Kim Clijsters | 6 | 7
4 | (United States) Lindsay Davenport | 4 | 5

=== Top half ===
==== Section 1 ====
First round
(United States) J Craybas | 6 | 3 | 2
(Colombia) F Zuluaga | 2 | 6 | 6
WC | (France) T Golovin | 6 | 6
WC | (Argentina) G Dulko | 2 | 3
(Russia) A Jidkova | 7 | 6
Q | (United States) S Cacic | 5 | 1
Q | (Russia) E Kulikovskaya | 6 | 6
(Italy) R Grande | 4 | 1

Second round
1 | (Belgium) K Clijsters | 6 | 7
(Colombia) F Zuluaga | 3 | 5
WC | (France) T Golovin | 5 | 5
31 | (Italy) F Schiavone | 7 | 7
17 | (Italy) S Farina Elia | 6 | 6
(Russia) A Jidkova | 4 | 0
Q | (Russia) E Kulikovskaya | 2 | 1
15 | (France) N Dechy | 6 | 6

Third round
1 | (Belgium) K Clijsters | 7 | 6
31 | (Italy) F Schiavone | 5 | 4
17 | (Italy) S Farina Elia | 6 | 4 | 4
15 | (France) N Dechy | 3 | 6 | 6

Fourth round
1 | (Belgium) K Clijsters | 6 | 3 | 6
15 | (France) N Dechy | 3 | 6 | 1

==== Section 2 ====
First round
(Austria) B Schett | 6 | 1 | 3
WC | (France) S Cohen-Aloro | 4 | 6 | 6
WC | (China) S Peng | 3 | 4
Q | (Luxembourg) C Schaul | 6 | 6
(Croatia) J Kostanić | 4 | 6 | 6
(Spain) C Torrens Valero | 6 | 4 | 2
(Slovakia) H Nagyová | 1 | 4
Q | (France) M Bartoli | 6 | 6

Second round
10 | (Bulgaria) M Maleeva | 6 | 2 | 7^{7}
WC | (France) S Cohen-Aloro | 3 | 6 | 6^{1}
Q | (Luxembourg) C Schaul | 4 | 4
21 | (Japan) A Sugiyama | 6 | 6
32 | (Slovakia) J Husárová | 3 | 7^{7} | 2
(Croatia) J Kostanić | 6 | 6^{4} | 6
Q | (France) M Bartoli | 4 | 3
8 | (United States) C Rubin | 6 | 6

Third round
10 | (Bulgaria) M Maleeva | 4 | 3
21 | (Japan) A Sugiyama | 6 | 6
(Croatia) J Kostanić | 1 | 3
8 | (United States) C Rubin | 6 | 6

Fourth round
21 | (Japan) A Sugiyama | 6 | 4 | 4
8 | (United States) C Rubin | 0 | 6 | 6

==== Section 3 ====
First round
WC | (Federal Republic of Yugoslavia) J Janković | 4 | 2
Q | (Hungary) P Mandula | 6 | 6
(Sweden) Å Svensson | 6 | 4 | 4
(Belgium) E Callens | 2 | 6 | 6
(Croatia) S Talaja | 6 | 3 | 6
(South Africa) J Kruger | 2 | 6 | 2
(Spain) M Marrero | 4 | 3
(Czech Republic) K Koukalová | 6 | 6

Second round
3 | (Slovakia) D Hantuchová | 6 | 6
Q | (Hungary) P Mandula | 2 | 3
(Belgium) E Callens | 4 | 0
27 | (Slovenia) K Srebotnik | 6 | 6
18 | (United States) L Raymond | 3 | 6 | 6
(Croatia) S Talaja | 6 | 3 | 2
(Czech Republic) K Koukalová | 2 | 2
16 | (South Africa) A Coetzer | 6 | 6

Third round
3 | (Slovakia) D Hantuchová | 7^{7} | 6
27 | (Slovenia) K Srebotnik | 6^{4} | 2
18 | (United States) L Raymond | 0 | 3
16 | (South Africa) A Coetzer | 6 | 6

Fourth round
3 | (Slovakia) D Hantuchová | 4 | 4
16 | (South Africa) A Coetzer | 6 | 6

==== Section 4 ====
First round
(Zimbabwe) C Black | 6 | 6
(United States) S Taylor | 0 | 4
(Switzerland) E Gagliardi | 7 | 6
WC | (Croatia) M Lučić | 5 | 3
Q | (Slovakia) Ľ Cervanová | 0 | 1
(France) V Razzano | 6 | 6
(Germany) B Rittner | 3 | 6 | 7^{7}
Q | (Canada) M Drake | 6 | 4 | 6^{5}

Second round
11 | (Israel) A Pistolesi | 6^{3} | 3
(Zimbabwe) C Black | 7^{7} | 6
(Switzerland) E Gagliardi | 4 | 6 | 6
19 | (Russia) T Panova | 6 | 4 | 4
26 | (Spain) C Martínez | 5 | 7^{7} | 6
(France) V Razzano | 7 | 6^{5} | 3
(Germany) B Rittner | 6 | 5 | 6
6 | (Federal Republic of Yugoslavia) J Dokić | 1 | 7 | 3

Third round
(Zimbabwe) C Black | 6^{3} | 0
(Switzerland) E Gagliardi | 7^{7} | 6
26 | (Spain) C Martínez | 0 | 6 | 6
(Germany) B Rittner | 6 | 3 | 3

Fourth round
(Switzerland) E Gagliardi | 1 | 2
26 | (Spain) C Martínez | 6 | 6

=== Bottom half ===
==== Section 5 ====
First round
(Germany) M Müller | 3 | 4
(Switzerland) M Casanova | 6 | 6
(Japan) S Asagoe | 7^{7} | 6
(Uzbekistan) I Tulyaganova | 6^{4} | 2
(Spain) M Serna | 6 | 6
(France) É Loit | 4 | 3
(Indonesia) A Widjaja | 5 | 6 | 6
Q | (Japan) A Morigami | 7 | 2 | 4

Second round
5 | (France) A Mauresmo | 6 | 6
(Switzerland) M Casanova | 4 | 0
(Japan) S Asagoe | 2 | 0
29 | (Thailand) T Tanasugarn | 6 | 6
24 | (Argentina) C Fernández | 6 | 4 | 1
(Spain) M Serna | 3 | 6 | 6
(Indonesia) A Widjaja | 6 | 6
9 | (Switzerland) P Schnyder | 4 | 2

Third round
5 | (France) A Mauresmo | 6 | 5 | 6
29 | (Thailand) T Tanasugarn | 3 | 7 | 2
(Spain) M Serna | 7 | 6
(Indonesia) A Widjaja | 5 | 2

Fourth round
5 | (France) A Mauresmo | 6 | 6
(Spain) M Serna | 2 | 3

==== Section 6 ====
First round
Q | (Slovakia) M Suchá | 1 | 3
(South Korea) Y-j Cho | 6 | 6
WC | (Russia) M Sharapova | 3 | 6 | 0
Q | (United States) S Reeves | 6 | 1 | 6
(United States) M Tu | 2 | 6 | 6
(Germany) A Roesch | 6 | 0 | 1
(Austria) P Wartusch | 3 | 2
(Czech Republic) D Bedáňová | 6 | 6

Second round
13 | (Russia) E Bovina | 6 | 5 | 6
(South Korea) Y-j Cho | 4 | 7 | 1
Q | (United States) S Reeves | 4 | 6 | 6
20 | (Argentina) P Suárez | 6 | 3 | 3
25 | (Russia) E Likhovtseva | 6 | 6
(United States) M Tu | 2 | 2
(Czech Republic) D Bedáňová | 3 | 7 | 1
4 | (United States) L Davenport | 6 | 5 | 6

Third round
13 | (Russia) E Bovina | 6 | 6
Q | (United States) S Reeves | 1 | 0
25 | (Russia) E Likhovtseva | 3 | 0
4 | (United States) L Davenport | 6 | 6

Fourth round
13 | (Russia) E Bovina | 4 | 3
4 | (United States) L Davenport | 6 | 6

==== Section 7 ====
First round
Q | (United States) J Kirkland | 3 | 0
(Russia) S Kuznetsova | 6 | 6
(Russia) V Zvonareva | 6 | 7
(Belarus) T Poutchek | 2 | 5
WC | (United States) B Mattek | 0 | 6 | 1
(Italy) F Pennetta | 6 | 4 | 6
(France) S Foretz | 7 | 2 | 7
(Germany) A Barna | 5 | 6 | 5

Second round
7 | (Russia) A Myskina | 4 | 7^{9} | 3
(Russia) S Kuznetsova | 6 | 6^{7} | 6
(Russia) V Zvonareva | 6 | 3 | 6
28 | (Croatia) I Majoli | 1 | 6 | 2
23 | (United States) M Shaughnessy | 6 | 6^{6} | 6
(Italy) F Pennetta | 3 | 7^{8} | 3
(France) S Foretz | 5 | 4
12 | (Greece) E Daniilidou | 7 | 6

Third round
(Russia) S Kuznetsova | 6 | 6^{5} | 4
(Russia) V Zvonareva | 3 | 7^{7} | 6
23 | (United States) M Shaughnessy | 6 | 6
12 | (Greece) E Daniilidou | 4 | 3

Fourth round
(Russia) V Zvonareva | 6 | 4 | 6
23 | (United States) M Shaughnessy | 3 | 6 | 2

==== Section 8 ====
First round
(Slovenia) T Pisnik | 7^{7} | 4 | 2
(Czech Republic) I Benešová | 6^{2} | 6 | 6
(Spain) V Ruano Pascual | 6 | 6
(United States) M Irvin | 3 | 0
(Czech Republic) D Chládková | 0 | 7^{7} | 7^{7}
(Russia) D Safina | 6 | 6^{4} | 6^{2}
(Italy) Ad. Serra Zanetti | 7^{7} | 3 | 3
Q | (Italy) An. Serra Zanetti | 6^{3} | 6 | 6

Second round
14 | (Russia) E Dementieva | 2 | 6 | 6
(Czech Republic) I Benešová | 6 | 4 | 1
(Spain) V Ruano Pascual | 6 | 6
22 | (United States) A Stevenson | 4 | 4
30 | (United States) L Granville | 3 | 0
(Czech Republic) D Chládková | 6 | 6
Q | (Italy) An. Serra Zanetti | 4 | 2
2 | (United States) J Capriati | 6 | 6

Third round
14 | (Russia) E Dementieva | 6 | 6^{1} | 6
(Spain) V Ruano Pascual | 3 | 7^{7} | 3
(Czech Republic) D Chládková | 2 | 2
2 | (United States) J Capriati | 6 | 6

Fourth round
14 | (Russia) E Dementieva | 4 | 6 | 1
2 | (United States) J Capriati | 6 | 4 | 6

== Qualifying ==
=== Qualifying seeds ===
1. (Spain) Conchita Martínez Granados (first round)
2. (Hungary) Petra Mandula (qualified)
3. (United States) ~~Sarah Taylor~~ (moved to Main Draw)
4. (France) Marion Bartoli (qualified)
5. (Spain) María Sánchez Lorenzo (first round)
6. (Paraguay) Rossana de los Ríos (first round)
7. (Italy) Antonella Serra Zanetti (qualified)
8. (Germany) Marlene Weingärtner (first round)
9. (Slovakia) Ľudmila Cervanová (qualified)
10. (Russia) Evgenia Kulikovskaya (qualified)
11. (Canada) Maureen Drake (qualified)
12. (Argentina) Mariana Díaz Oliva (qualifying competition)
13. (Japan) Saori Obata (qualifying competition)
14. (United States) Lindsay Lee-Waters (qualifying competition)
15. (United States) Ansley Cargill (qualifying competition)
16. (Russia) Nadia Petrova (qualifying competition)
17. (United States) Samantha Reeves (qualified)
18. (Indonesia) Wynne Prakusya (qualifying competition)
19. (Slovakia) Ľubomíra Kurhajcová (first round)
20. (Venezuela) Milagros Sequera (qualifying competition)
21. (Japan) Akiko Morigami (qualified)
22. (Hungary) Anikó Kapros (qualifying competition)
23. (Israel) Tzipora Obziler (qualifying competition)
24. (Slovakia) Martina Suchá (qualifying)
25. (Germany) Gréta Arn (qualifying competition)

=== Qualifiers ===
1. (United States) Sandra Cacic
2. (Hungary) Petra Mandula
3. (United States) Jessica Kirkland
4. (France) Marion Bartoli
5. (Luxembourg) Claudine Schaul
6. (Japan) Akiko Morigami
7. (Italy) Antonella Serra Zanetti
8. (United States) Samantha Reeves
9. (Slovakia) Ľudmila Cervanová
10. (Russia) Evgenia Kulikovskaya
11. (Canada) Maureen Drake
12. (Slovakia) Martina Suchá

=== Qualifying draw ===
==== First qualifier ====
| First round | | | | | Qualifying competition |
| 1 | (Spain) Conchita Martínez Granados | 7 | 2 | 2 |
| PR | (United States) Sandra Cacic | 5 | 6 | 6 | PR | (United States) Sandra Cacic | 0 | 7^{7} | 3 |
| | (United States) Mashona Washington | 4 | 7^{7} | 6^{2} | 22 | (Hungary) Anikó Kapros | 6 | 6^{3} | 1^{r} |
| 22 | (Hungary) Anikó Kapros | 6 | 6^{1} | 7^{7} |

==== Second qualifier ====
| First round | | | | | Qualifying competition |
| 2 | (Hungary) Petra Mandula | 6 | 6 |
| WC | (United States) Anne Yelsey | 1 | 2 | | 2 | (Hungary) Petra Mandula | 6 | 6 |
| | (Ukraine) Julia Vakulenko | 6 | 6^{5} | 3 | 20 | (Venezuela) Milagros Sequera | 3 | 0 |
| 20 | (Venezuela) Milagros Sequera | 1 | 7^{7} | 6 |

==== Third qualifier ====
| First round | | | | | Qualifying competition |
| 25 | (Germany) Gréta Arn | 2 | 6 | 6 |
| | (Spain) Gala León García | 6 | 2 | 4 | 25 | (Germany) Gréta Arn | 3 | 6 | 4 |
| WC | (United States) Jessica Kirkland | 6 | 6 | | WC | (United States) Jessica Kirkland | 6 | 4 | 6 |
| 19 | (Slovakia) Ľubomíra Kurhajcová | 3 | 4 |

==== Fourth qualifier ====
| First round | | | | | Qualifying competition |
| 4 | (France) Marion Bartoli | 6 | 6 |
| WC | (United States) Alexandra Podkolzina | 0 | 0 | | 4 | (France) Marion Bartoli | 6 | 6 |
| | (Ukraine) Tatiana Perebiynis | 2 | 6 | 2 | 15 | (United States) Ansley Cargill | 2 | 4 |
| 15 | (United States) Ansley Cargill | 6 | 4 | 6 |

==== Fifth qualifier ====
| First round | | | | | Qualifying competition |
| 5 | (Spain) María Sánchez Lorenzo | 3 | 3 |
| | (Luxembourg) Claudine Schaul | 6 | 6 | | | (Luxembourg) Claudine Schaul | 6 | 6 |
| | (Argentina) María Emilia Salerni | 6 | 4 | 4 | 14 | (United States) Lindsay Lee-Waters | 3 | 4 |
| 14 | (United States) Lindsay Lee-Waters | 2 | 6 | 6 |

==== Sixth qualifier ====
| First round | | | | Qualifying competition |
| 6 | (Paraguay) Rossana de los Ríos | 4 | 2 |
| | (Netherlands) Seda Noorlander | 6 | 6 | | (Netherlands) Seda Noorlander | 4 | 7 | 1 |
| | (Slovakia) Stanislava Hrozenská | 4 | 2 | 21 | (Japan) Akiko Morigami | 6 | 5 | 6 |
| 21 | (Japan) Akiko Morigami | 6 | 6 |

==== Seventh qualifier ====
| First round | | | | | Qualifying competition |
| 7 | (Italy) Antonella Serra Zanetti | 6 | 6 |
| | (Russia) Anastasia Rodionova | 2 | 2 | | 7 | (Italy) Antonella Serra Zanetti | 6 | 6 |
| | (Hungary) Zsófia Gubacsi | 4 | 6 | 3 | 23 | (Israel) Tzipora Obziler | 3 | 1 |
| 23 | (Israel) Tzipora Obziler | 6 | 2 | 6 |

==== Eighth qualifier ====
| First round | | | | Qualifying competition |
| 8 | (Germany) Marlene Weingärtner | 3 | 6^{4} |
| | (France) Camille Pin | 6 | 7^{7} | | (France) Camille Pin | 7^{9} | 2 | 1 |
| Alt | (Czech Republic) Alena Vašková | 4 | 2 | 17 | (United States) Samantha Reeves | 6^{7} | 6 | 6 |
| 17 | (United States) Samantha Reeves | 6 | 6 |

==== Ninth qualifier ====
| First round | | | | | Qualifying competition |
| 9 | (Slovakia) Ľudmila Cervanová | 6 | 0 | 6 |
| | (Czech Republic) Renata Voráčová | 3 | 6 | 3 | 9 | (Slovakia) Ľudmila Cervanová | 6 | 6^{5} | 6 |
| | (Germany) Jana Kandarr | 2 | 6^{4} | | 18 | (Indonesia) Wynne Prakusya | 2 | 7^{7} | 1 |
| 18 | (Indonesia) Wynne Prakusya | 6 | 7^{7} |

==== Tenth qualifier ====
| First round | | | | Qualifying competition |
| 10 | (Russia) Evgenia Kulikovskaya | 6 | 6 |
| | (Slovakia) Eva Fislová | 2 | 2 | 10 | (Russia) Evgenia Kulikovskaya | 6 | 6 |
| WC | (United States) Robyn Baker | 1 | 0 | 16 | (Russia) Nadia Petrova | 3 | 4 |
| 16 | (Russia) Nadia Petrova | 6 | 6 |

==== Eleventh qualifier ====
| First round | | | | Qualifying competition |
| 11 | (Canada) Maureen Drake | 6 | 6 |
| WC | (United States) Cory Ann Avants | 4 | 2 | 11 | (Canada) Maureen Drake | 6 | 6 |
| | (Belarus) Olga Barabanschikova | 6^{6} | 4 | 13 | (Japan) Saori Obata | 2 | 1 |
| 13 | (Japan) Saori Obata | 7^{8} | 6 |

==== Twelfth qualifier ====
| First round | | | | | Qualifying competition |
| 12 | (Argentina) Mariana Díaz Oliva | 6 | 3 | 6 |
| WC | (United States) Allison Bradshaw | 4 | 6 | 4 | 12 | (Argentina) Mariana Díaz Oliva | 6^{4} | 7^{7} | 2 |
| | (Czech Republic) Sandra Kleinová | 2 | 3 | | 24 | (Slovakia) Martina Suchá | 7^{7} | 6^{5} | 6 |
| 24 | (Slovakia) Martina Suchá | 6 | 6 |
