= Jewel Peterson =

American tennis player

- Full name: Jewel Renee Peterson
- Country (sports): United States
- Born: September 10, 1981 (age 44) College Park, Georgia, U.S.
- Height: 5 ft 7 in (170 cm)
- Plays: Right-handed
- Prize money: $57,232

Singles
- Highest ranking: No. 214 (June 7, 2004)

Grand Slam singles results
- US Open: Q2 (2004)

Doubles
- Highest ranking: No. 449 (November 14, 2005)

Grand Slam doubles results
- US Open: 1R (2004)

Grand Slam mixed doubles results
- US Open: 1R (2004)

Jewel Renee Peterson (born September 10, 1981) is an American former professional tennis player.

Peterson, born and raised in College Park, Georgia, played collegiate tennis at the University of Southern California (USC). While at USC she was a four-time All-American and an NCAA semi-finalist as a senior in 2003.

A right-handed player, Peterson reached a career high singles ranking of 214 in the world and qualified for the main draw of the 2005 Miami Open. She featured in both doubles main draws at the 2004 US Open, partnering Alexandra Mueller in the women's and Phillip Simmonds in the mixed event.

Peterson was a childhood coach of Coco Gauff in Atlanta.

== ITF finals ==
Legend
$25,000 tournaments
$10,000 tournaments

=== Singles: 2 (0–2) ===
Outcome	No.	Date	Tournament	Surface	Opponent	Score
Runner-up	1.	June 15, 2003	Allentown, U.S.	Hard	(United States) Diana Ospina	6–2, 2–6, 0–6
Runner-up	2.	July 14, 2003	Baltimore, U.S.	Hard	(Russia) Olga Puchkova	2–6, 4–6
