= 2004 US Open – Girls' doubles =

Girls' doubles
- 2004 US Open

Final
- Champions: (New Zealand) Marina Erakovic (Netherlands) Michaëlla Krajicek
- Runners-up: (Romania) Mădălina Gojnea (Romania) Monica Niculescu
- Score: 7–6^{(7–4)}, 6–0

Events
Singles	men	women		boys	girls
Doubles	men	women	mixed	boys	girls
WC Singles	men	women	quad
WC Doubles	men	women	quad
Legends	men	women	mixed
- US Open

Marina Erakovic and Michaëlla Krajicek won in the final 7–6^{(7–4)}, 6–0, against Mădălina Gojnea and Monica Niculescu.

== Seeds ==
1. N.A.
2. (Belarus) Victoria Azarenka / (Belarus) Olga Govortsova (semifinals)
3. (New Zealand) Marina Erakovic / (Netherlands) Michaëlla Krajicek (champions)
4. (Russia) Alisa Kleybanova / (Israel) Shahar Pe'er (quarterfinals)
5. (Romania) Mădălina Gojnea / (Romania) Monica Niculescu (final)
6. (Canada) Stéphanie Dubois / (Canada) Aleksandra Wozniak (quarterfinals)
7. (Czech Republic) Nikola Fraňková / (Hungary) Ágnes Szávay (semifinals)
8. (Switzerland) Timea Bacsinszky / (Poland) Marta Leśniak (first round)

== Draw ==
Key

- Q = Qualifier
- WC = Wild card
- LL = Lucky loser
- Alt = Alternate
- ITF = ITF entry
- PR = Protected ranking
- SR = Special ranking
- SE = Special exempt
- JE = Junior exempt
- JR = Junior Accelerator Programme entrant
- CO = College Accelerator Programme entrant
- NG = Next Gen Accelerator Program entrant
- w/o = Walkover
- r = Retired
- d = Defaulted

=== Finals ===
Semifinals
5	(Romania) Mădălina Gojnea (Romania) Monica Niculescu	6	5	7
7	(Czech Republic) Nikola Fraňková (Hungary) Ágnes Szávay	2	7	5
3	(New Zealand) Marina Erakovic (Netherlands) Michaëlla Krajicek	4	7^{9}	6
2	(Belarus) Victoria Azarenka (Belarus) Olga Govortsova	6	6^{7}	2

Final
5	(Romania) Mădălina Gojnea (Romania) Monica Niculescu	6^{4}	0
3	(New Zealand) Marina Erakovic (Netherlands) Michaëlla Krajicek	7^{7}	6

=== Top half ===
First round
Alt	(Chinese Taipei) I-Hsuan Hwang (Brazil) Roxane Vaisemberg	3	5
(Netherlands) Bibiane Schoofs (Italy) Verdiana Verardi	6	7
(United States) Mary Gambale (United States) Krystina Marcio	3	7	4
(Serbia and Montenegro) Vojislava Lukić (Russia) Olga Puchkova	6	5	6
(Germany) Tatjana Malek (Germany) Vanessa Pinto	6	4	6
(Croatia) Sanja Ančić (Netherlands) Nicole Thyssen	4	6	4
(Canada) Sharon Fichman (Canada) Mélanie Gloria	0	2
5	(Romania) Mădălina Gojnea (Romania) Monica Niculescu	6	6
4	(Russia) Alisa Kleybanova (Israel) Shahar Pe'er	6	6
(United States) Andrea Remynse (United States) Jennifer Stevens	4	2
(Russia) Ekaterina Kosminskaya (Russia) Evgeniya Rodina	5	5
(Germany) Maraike Biglmaier (Poland) Magdalena Kiszczyńska	7	7
(Serbia and Montenegro) Teodora Mirčić (Argentina) Florencia Molinero	6	3	6
(Austria) Tamira Paszek (Denmark) Caroline Wozniacki	2	6	4
WC	(United States) Jessica Kirkland (United States) Alexandra Mueller	3	6	0
7	(Czech Republic) Nikola Fraňková (Hungary) Ágnes Szávay	6	4	6

Second round
(Netherlands) B Schoofs (Italy) V Verardi	3	6	6
(Serbia and Montenegro) V Lukić (Russia) O Puchkova	6	4	4
(Germany) T Malek (Germany) V Pinto	2	1
5	(Romania) M Gojnea (Romania) M Niculescu	6	6
4	(Russia) A Kleybanova (Israel) S Pe'er	6	6
(Germany) M Biglmaier (Poland) M Kiszczyńska	2	1
(Serbia and Montenegro) T Mirčić (Argentina) F Molinero	5	1
7	(Czech Republic) N Fraňková (Hungary) Á Szávay	7	6

Quarterfinals
(Netherlands) B Schoofs (Italy) V Verardi	4	1
5	(Romania) M Gojnea (Romania) M Niculescu	6	6
4	(Russia) A Kleybanova (Israel) S Pe'er	4	3
7	(Czech Republic) N Fraňková (Hungary) Á Szávay	6	6

Semifinals
5	(Romania) M Gojnea (Romania) M Niculescu	6	5	7
7	(Czech Republic) N Fraňková (Hungary) Á Szávay	2	7	5

=== Bottom half ===
First round
6	(Canada) Stéphanie Dubois (Canada) Aleksandra Wozniak	6	6
WC	(United States) Vania King (United States) Riza Zalameda	1	3
(Slovakia) Dominika Cibulková (Croatia) Mirna Marinović	6	3	2
(South Korea) So-Jung Kim (Japan) Ayumi Morita	2	6	6
(United States) Yasmin Schnack (United States) Katrina Tsang	3	3
(Romania) Mihaela Buzărnescu (Romania) Ágnes Szatmári	6	6
WC	(United States) Julia Cohen (United States) Yvette Hyndman	0	2
3	(New Zealand) Marina Erakovic (Netherlands) Michaëlla Krajicek	6	6
8	(Switzerland) Timea Bacsinszky (Poland) Marta Leśniak	2	6	3
(Russia) Irina Kotkina (Russia) Yaroslava Shvedova	6	3	6
(Bolivia) María Fernanda Álvarez Terán (Slovenia) Ana Jerman	4	1
(Sweden) Michaela Johansson (United States) Ellah Nze	6	6
(Italy) Giulia Gabba (Italy) Karin Knapp	6	6
WC	(United States) Sarah Fansler (United States) Elizabeth Kobak	0	2
(United States) Lindsay Burdette (United States) Alexa Glatch	4	7^{7}	0
2	(Belarus) Victoria Azarenka (Belarus) Olga Govortsova	6	6^{1}	6

Second round
6	(Canada) S Dubois (Canada) A Wozniak	6	7
(South Korea) S-J Kim (Japan) A Morita	3	5
(Romania) M Buzărnescu (Romania) Á Szatmári	6^{5}	3
3	(New Zealand) M Erakovic (Netherlands) M Krajicek	7^{7}	6
(Russia) I Kotkina (Russia) Y Shvedova	6	6
(Sweden) M Johansson (United States) E Nze	2	3
(Italy) G Gabba (Italy) K Knapp	5	4
2	(Belarus) V Azarenka (Belarus) O Govortsova	7	6

Quarterfinals
6	(Canada) S Dubois (Canada) A Wozniak	1	2
3	(New Zealand) M Erakovic (Netherlands) M Krajicek	6	6
(Russia) I Kotkina (Russia) Y Shvedova	5	2
2	(Belarus) V Azarenka (Belarus) O Govortsova	7	6

Semifinals
3	(New Zealand) M Erakovic (Netherlands) M Krajicek	4	7^{9}	6
2	(Belarus) V Azarenka (Belarus) O Govortsova	6	6^{7}	2
