= 2004 US Open – Boys' doubles =

Boys' doubles
- 2004 US Open

Final
- Champion: (United States) Brendan Evans (United States) Scott Oudsema
- Runner-up: (Germany) Andreas Beck (Germany) Sebastian Rieschick
- Score: 4–6, 6–1, 6–2

Events
Singles	men	women		boys	girls
Doubles	men	women	mixed	boys	girls
WC Singles	men	women	quad
WC Doubles	men	women	quad
Legends	men	women	mixed
- US Open

Brendan Evans and Scott Oudsema won in the final 4–6, 6–1, 6–2, against Andreas Beck and Sebastian Rieschick.

== Seeds ==
1. (United States) Brendan Evans / (United States) Scott Oudsema (champions)
2. (United States) Alex Kuznetsov / (Germany) Mischa Zverev (quarterfinals)
3. (Spain) Pablo Andújar / (Argentina) Juan Martín del Potro (second round)
4. (United States) Scoville Jenkins / (United States) Nikita Kryvonos (second round)
5. (Germany) Andreas Beck / (Germany) Sebastian Rieschick (final)
6. (Netherlands) Robin Haase / (Netherlands) Igor Sijsling (quarterfinals)
7. (Serbia and Montenegro) Viktor Troicki / (Chinese Taipei) Chu-Huan Yi (semifinals)
8. (El Salvador) Rafael Arévalo / (Netherlands) Coen van Keulen (first round, retired)

== Draw ==
Key

- Q = Qualifier
- WC = Wild card
- LL = Lucky loser
- Alt = Alternate
- ITF = ITF entry
- PR = Protected ranking
- SR = Special ranking
- SE = Special exempt
- JE = Junior exempt
- JR = Junior Accelerator Programme entrant
- CO = College Accelerator Programme entrant
- NG = Next Gen Accelerator Program entrant
- w/o = Walkover
- r = Retired
- d = Defaulted

=== Finals ===
Semifinals
1	(United States) Brendan Evans (United States) Scott Oudsema	6	6^{4}	6
(United Kingdom) Andy Murray (United Kingdom) Jamie Murray	1	7^{7}	4
7	(Serbia and Montenegro) Viktor Troicki (Chinese Taipei) Chu-Huan Yi	6	5	2
5	(Germany) Andreas Beck (Germany) Sebastian Rieschick	3	7	6

Final
1	(United States) Brendan Evans (United States) Scott Oudsema	4	6	6
5	(Germany) Andreas Beck (Germany) Sebastian Rieschick	6	1	2

=== Top half ===
First round
1	(United States) Brendan Evans (United States) Scott Oudsema	4	6	6
(Italy) Andrea Arnaboldi (Denmark) Martin Pedersen	6	3	2
(United States) Dennis Lajola (United States) Donald Young	6	6
WC	(United States) Shan Sondhu (United States) Okechi Womeodu	4	3
(United States) Alex Clayton (United States) Jamie Hunt	6	3	4
(New Zealand) G.D. Jones (New Zealand) William Ward	3	6	6
(Germany) Steven Moneke (Germany) Dominik Müller	1
8	(El Salvador) Rafael Arévalo (Netherlands) Coen van Keulen	3^{r}
3	(Spain) Pablo Andújar (Argentina) Juan Martín del Potro	6	7^{7}
(France) Jérémy Chardy (Italy) Fabio Fognini	4	6^{1}
(United Kingdom) Andy Murray (United Kingdom) Jamie Murray	6	6
(India) Tushar Liberhan (India) Divij Sharan	2	3
(United States) Vahid Mirzadeh (United States) Phillip Simmonds	6	6
(Czech Republic) Dušan Lojda (Croatia) Franko Škugor	3	2
(Croatia) Jurica Grubisic (Croatia) Antonio Veić	2	7^{7}	4
6	(Netherlands) Robin Haase (Netherlands) Igor Sijsling	6	6^{4}	6

Second round
1	(United States) B Evans (United States) S Oudsema	6	6
(United States) D Lajola (United States) D Young	3	1
(New Zealand) GD Jones (New Zealand) W Ward	6	6
(Germany) S Moneke (Germany) D Müller	3	4
3	(Spain) P Andújar (Argentina) JM del Potro	1	2
(United Kingdom) A Murray (United Kingdom) J Murray	6	6
(United States) V Mirzadeh (United States) P Simmonds	6	3	3
6	(Netherlands) R Haase (Netherlands) I Sijsling	3	6	6

Quarterfinals
1	(United States) B Evans (United States) S Oudsema	4	6	6
(New Zealand) GD Jones (New Zealand) W Ward	6	4	3
(United Kingdom) A Murray (United Kingdom) J Murray	6	6
6	(Netherlands) R Haase (Netherlands) I Sijsling	3	4

Semifinals
1	(United States) B Evans (United States) S Oudsema	6	6^{4}	6
(United Kingdom) A Murray (United Kingdom) J Murray	1	7^{7}	4

=== Bottom half ===
First round
7	(Serbia and Montenegro) Viktor Troicki (Chinese Taipei) Chu-Huan Yi	6	6
WC	(United States) Kellen Damico (United States) Calvin Kemp	2	3
(Netherlands) Remko de Rijke (Netherlands) Antal van der Duim	6	6
(United Kingdom) Jamie Baker (United Kingdom) Tom Rushby	4	4
WC	(United States) Dylan Arnould (United States) Jesse Levine	6	2	5
(South Africa) Kevin Anderson (South Africa) Fritz Wolmarans	4	6	7
(Canada) Érik Chvojka (India) Navdeep Singh	4	1
4	(United States) Scoville Jenkins (United States) Nikita Kryvonos	6	6
5	(Germany) Andreas Beck (Germany) Sebastian Rieschick	6	6
(Belgium) Niels Desein (Italy) Gianluca Naso	1	2
WC	(United States) Sam Querrey (United States) Spencer Vegosen	3	4
(Ukraine) Sergei Bubka (United Kingdom) Miles Kasiri	6	6
(United States) Timothy Neilly (United States) Tim Smyczek	6	7^{7}
(Croatia) Marin Čilić (Ukraine) Oleksandr Nedovyesov	3	6^{1}
Alt	(United States) Robert Cameron (United States) Gregory Ouellette	2	4
2	(United States) Alex Kuznetsov (Germany) Mischa Zverev	6	6

Second round
7	(Serbia and Montenegro) V Troicki (Chinese Taipei) C-H Yi	6	6
(Netherlands) R de Rijke (Netherlands) A van der Duim	1	2
(South Africa) K Anderson (South Africa) F Wolmarans	6	6
4	(United States) S Jenkins (United States) N Kryvonos	4	4
5	(Germany) A Beck (Germany) S Rieschick	6	6
(Ukraine) S Bubka (United Kingdom) M Kasiri	4	1
(United States) T Neilly (United States) T Smyczek	6^{6}	2
2	(United States) A Kuznetsov (Germany) M Zverev	7^{8}	6

Quarterfinals
7	(Serbia and Montenegro) V Troicki (Chinese Taipei) C-H Yi	6	3	7^{10}
(South Africa) K Anderson (South Africa) F Wolmarans	3	6	6^{8}
5	(Germany) A Beck (Germany) S Rieschick	1	6	6
2	(United States) A Kuznetsov (Germany) M Zverev	6	4	3

Semifinals
7	(Serbia and Montenegro) V Troicki (Chinese Taipei) C-H Yi	6	5	2
5	(Germany) A Beck (Germany) S Rieschick	3	7	6
