= 2004 US Open – Men's doubles =

Men's doubles
- 2004 US Open

Final
- Champion: (The Bahamas) Mark Knowles (Canada) Daniel Nestor
- Runner-up: (India) Leander Paes (Czech Republic) David Rikl
- Score: 6–3, 6–3

Details
- Draw: 64
- Seeds: 16

Events
Singles	men	women		boys	girls
Doubles	men	women	mixed	boys	girls
WC Singles	men	women	quad
WC Doubles	men	women	quad
Legends	men	women	mixed
← 2003 ·	US Open	· 2005 →

Jonas Björkman and Todd Woodbridge were the defending champions, but lost in the third round to Leander Paes and David Rikl.

Mark Knowles and Daniel Nestor won the title, defeating Leander Paes and David Rikl in the final, 6–3, 6–3.

== Seeds ==
1. (Sweden) Jonas Björkman / (Australia) Todd Woodbridge (third round)
2. (United States) Bob Bryan / (United States) Mike Bryan (third round)
3. (The Bahamas) Mark Knowles / (Canada) Daniel Nestor (champions)
4. (India) Mahesh Bhupathi / (Belarus) Max Mirnyi (third round)
5. (France) Michaël Llodra / (France) Fabrice Santoro (second round)
6. (Zimbabwe) Wayne Black / (Zimbabwe) Kevin Ullyett (quarterfinals)
7. (Australia) Wayne Arthurs / (Australia) Paul Hanley (first round)
8. (Czech Republic) Martin Damm / (Czech Republic) Cyril Suk (third round)
9. (Austria) Julian Knowle / (Serbia) Nenad Zimonjić (second round)
10. (Argentina) Gastón Etlis / (Argentina) Martín Rodríguez (first round)
11. (Czech Republic) František Čermák / (Czech Republic) Leoš Friedl (first round)
12. (United States) Jared Palmer / (Czech Republic) Pavel Vízner (third round)
13. (India) Leander Paes / (Czech Republic) David Rikl (final)
14. (Israel) Jonathan Erlich / (Israel) Andy Ram (first round)
15. (Argentina) Lucas Arnold Ker / (Argentina) Mariano Hood (second round)
16. (South Africa) Chris Haggard / (Czech Republic) Petr Pála (first round)

== Draw ==
=== Key ===
- Q = Qualifier
- WC = Wild card
- LL = Lucky loser
- Alt = Alternate
- ITF = ITF entry
- PR = Protected ranking
- SR = Special ranking
- SE = Special exempt
- JE = Junior exempt
- JR = Junior Accelerator Programme entrant
- CO = College Accelerator Programme entrant
- NG = Next Gen Accelerator Program entrant
- w/o = Walkover
- r = Retired
- d = Defaulted

=== Finals ===
Quarterfinals
13	(India) Leander Paes (Czech Republic) David Rikl	7	6
(Spain) Feliciano López (Spain) Fernando Verdasco	6^{4}	3
(Spain) Rafael Nadal (Spain) Tommy Robredo	7	7
(South Africa) Robbie Koenig (United States) Travis Parrott	5	5
(Chile) Fernando González (Chile) Nicolás Massú	6^{1}	7	4
3	(The Bahamas) Mark Knowles (Canada) Daniel Nestor	7	5	6
6	(Zimbabwe) Wayne Black (Zimbabwe) Kevin Ullyett	4	7	4
(France) Julien Benneteau (France) Nicolas Mahut	6	6^{5}	6

Semifinals
13	(India) Leander Paes (Czech Republic) David Rikl	6	6
(Spain) Rafael Nadal (Spain) Tommy Robredo	3	3
3	(The Bahamas) Mark Knowles (Canada) Daniel Nestor	7	7
(France) Julien Benneteau (France) Nicolas Mahut	6^{5}	6^{5}

Final
13	(India) Leander Paes (Czech Republic) David Rikl	3	3
3	(The Bahamas) Mark Knowles (Canada) Daniel Nestor	6	6

=== Top half ===
==== Section 1 ====
First round
1	(Sweden) J Björkman (Australia) T Woodbridge	6	6^{6}	6
(United States) S Humphries (United States) D Johnson	3	7	1
(Slovakia) D Hrbatý (Czech Republic) J Levinský	7	7
(Argentina) J Mónaco (Argentina) M Zabaleta	6^{5}	6^{5}
(Switzerland) Y Allegro (Germany) M Kohlmann	6	3	7
(Morocco) H Arazi (Belgium) T Vanhoudt	3	6	5
(Croatia) M Ančić (Croatia) I Ljubičić	4	2
13	(India) L Paes (Czech Republic) D Rikl	6	6
10	(Argentina) G Etlis (Argentina) M Rodríguez	1	4
(Sweden) S Aspelin (Australia) T Perry	6	6
(Italy) M Bertolini (Italy) F Volandri	3	3
(Austria) J Melzer (Austria) A Peya	6	6
(Spain) F López (Spain) F Verdasco	7	6
WC	(United States) B Evans (United States) S Oudsema	5	4
(Czech Republic) J Novák (Czech Republic) R Štěpánek	7	5	6^{5}
5	(France) M Llodra (France) F Santoro	5	7	7

Second round
1	(Sweden) J Björkman (Australia) T Woodbridge	6	6^{6}	6
(Slovakia) D Hrbatý (Czech Republic) J Levinský	3	7	1
(Switzerland) Y Allegro (Germany) M Kohlmann	2	6^{5}
13	(India) L Paes (Czech Republic) D Rikl	6	7
(Sweden) S Aspelin (Australia) T Perry	6	6
(Austria) J Melzer (Austria) A Peya	3	3
(Spain) F López (Spain) F Verdasco	7	6
5	(France) M Llodra (France) F Santoro	6^{4}	3

Third round
1	(Sweden) J Björkman (Australia) T Woodbridge	6	5	4
13	(India) L Paes (Czech Republic) D Rikl	2	7	6
(Sweden) S Aspelin (Australia) T Perry	6	6^{4}	4
(Spain) F López (Spain) F Verdasco	3	7	6

Quarterfinals
13	(India) L Paes (Czech Republic) D Rikl	7	6
(Spain) F López (Spain) F Verdasco	6^{4}	3

==== Section 2 ====
First round
4	(India) M Bhupathi (Belarus) M Mirnyi	4	6	7
(Argentina) M García (Argentina) S Prieto	6	4	6^{3}
(Argentina) F Browne (Argentina) G Cañas	7	4	3
(Germany) R Schüttler (Russia) M Youzhny	6^{4}	6	6
(Australia) J Kerr (United States) J Thomas	3	7	6
(France) S Grosjean (France) P-H Mathieu	6	6^{2}	4
(Spain) R Nadal (Spain) T Robredo	6	6
16	(South Africa) C Haggard (Czech Republic) P Pála	4	2
11	(Czech Republic) F Čermák (Czech Republic) L Friedl	3	3
(South Africa) R Koenig (United States) T Parrott	6	6
(Russia) I Andreev (Spain) D Ferrer	6	6
(Georgia (country)) I Labadze (Spain) Á López Morón	3	2
(Poland) M Fyrstenberg (Poland) M Matkowski	7	7
WC	(United States) S Jenkins (United States) A Kuznetsov	6^{4}	5
(Germany) F Mayer (Netherlands) R Wassen	7	4	6
7	(Australia) W Arthurs (Australia) P Hanley	5	6	4

Second round
4	(India) M Bhupathi (Belarus) M Mirnyi	w/o
(Germany) R Schüttler (Russia) M Youzhny
(Australia) J Kerr (United States) J Thomas	6^{5}	5
(Spain) R Nadal (Spain) T Robredo	7	7
(South Africa) R Koenig (United States) T Parrott	6	6
(Russia) I Andreev (Spain) D Ferrer	3	3
(Poland) M Fyrstenberg (Poland) M Matkowski	6	5	4
(Germany) F Mayer (Netherlands) R Wassen	4	7	6

Third round
4	(India) M Bhupathi (Belarus) M Mirnyi	4	4
(Spain) R Nadal (Spain) T Robredo	6	6
(South Africa) R Koenig (United States) T Parrott	7	7
(Germany) F Mayer (Netherlands) R Wassen	5	5

Quarterfinals
(Spain) R Nadal (Spain) T Robredo	7	7
(South Africa) R Koenig (United States) T Parrott	5	5

=== Bottom half ===
==== Section 3 ====
First round
8	(Czech Republic) M Damm (Czech Republic) C Suk	6	6
(Sweden) T Johansson (Sweden) R Lindstedt	1	4
(Czech Republic) T Berdych (Croatia) I Karlović	7	7
(United States) R Ginepri (The Bahamas) M Merklein	5	6^{4}
(Germany) K Braasch (Armenia) S Sargsian	6^{3}	4
(Chile) F González (Chile) N Massú	7	6
(Belgium) X Malisse (Belgium) O Rochus	1	4
9	(Austria) J Knowle (Serbia) N Zimonjić	6	6
15	(Argentina) L Arnold Ker (Argentina) M Hood	7	6
(Czech Republic) T Cibulec (Czech Republic) D Škoch	6^{3}	4
(France) G Carraz (France) A Clément	7	3	4
WC	(United States) J Gimelstob (United States) G Oliver	6^{3}	6	6
(France) J-F Bachelot (Romania) A Pavel	6	7
(Denmark) K Carlsen (United States) V Spadea	3	6^{1}
(Brazil) G Kuerten (Brazil) A Sá	4	3
3	(The Bahamas) M Knowles (Canada) D Nestor	6	6

Second round
8	(Czech Republic) M Damm (Czech Republic) C Suk	6^{3}	6	6
(Czech Republic) T Berdych (Croatia) I Karlović	7	3	3
(Chile) F González (Chile) N Massú	5	7	7
9	(Austria) J Knowle (Serbia) N Zimonjić	7	5	6^{5}
15	(Argentina) L Arnold Ker (Argentina) M Hood	5	3
WC	(United States) J Gimelstob (United States) G Oliver	7	6
(France) J-F Bachelot (Romania) A Pavel	6	4	4
3	(The Bahamas) M Knowles (Canada) D Nestor	3	6	6

Third round
8	(Czech Republic) M Damm (Czech Republic) C Suk	6	6^{5}	2
(Chile) F González (Chile) N Massú	3	7	6
WC	(United States) J Gimelstob (United States) G Oliver	2	1
3	(The Bahamas) M Knowles (Canada) D Nestor	6	6

Quarterfinals
(Chile) F González (Chile) N Massú	6^{1}	7	4
3	(The Bahamas) M Knowles (Canada) D Nestor	7	5	6

==== Section 4 ====
First round
6	(Zimbabwe) W Black (Zimbabwe) K Ullyett	6	6
(Argentina) J-I Chela (Argentina) G Gaudio	2	1
WC	(United States) K Corkery (United States) S Warburg	4	4
(Spain) A Martín (Spain) D Sánchez	6	6
(United States) R Leach (United States) B MacPhie	4	6^{5}
(Russia) N Davydenko (Australia) A Fisher	6	7
(Argentina) J Acasuso (Peru) L Horna	6^{3}	6^{3}
12	(United States) J Palmer (Czech Republic) P Vízner	7	7
14	(Israel) J Erlich (Israel) A Ram	4	6	6^{5}
(France) J Benneteau (France) N Mahut	6	1	7
WC	(United States) V Mirzadeh (United States) P Simmonds	2	3
WC	(United States) B Baker (United States) R Ram	6	6
(Slovakia) K Beck (Sweden) R Söderling	6^{1}	6	6
(South Africa) J Coetzee (France) C Saulnier	7	3	4
WC	(United States) A Delic (United States) J Morrison	3	4
2	(United States) B Bryan (United States) M Bryan	6	6

Second round
6	(Zimbabwe) W Black (Zimbabwe) K Ullyett	6	6
(Spain) A Martín (Spain) D Sánchez	3	4
(Russia) N Davydenko (Australia) A Fisher	4	1
12	(United States) J Palmer (Czech Republic) P Vízner	6	6
(France) J Benneteau (France) N Mahut	6	6
WC	(United States) B Baker (United States) R Ram	2	4
(Slovakia) K Beck (Sweden) R Söderling	1	3
2	(United States) B Bryan (United States) M Bryan	6	6

Third round
6	(Zimbabwe) W Black (Zimbabwe) K Ullyett	6	6
12	(United States) J Palmer (Czech Republic) P Vízner	1	0
(France) J Benneteau (France) N Mahut	7	6
2	(United States) B Bryan (United States) M Bryan	6^{5}	1

Quarterfinals
6	(Zimbabwe) W Black (Zimbabwe) K Ullyett	4	7	4
(France) J Benneteau (France) N Mahut	6	6^{5}	6
