= 2004 US Open (tennis) =

- Date: August 30 - September 12
- Edition: 124th
- Category: Grand Slam (ITF)
- Surface: Hardcourt
- Location: New York City, U.S.
- Venue: USTA Billie Jean King National Tennis Center

Champions

Men's singles
- (Switzerland) Roger Federer

Women's singles
- (Russia) Svetlana Kuznetsova

Men's doubles
- (The Bahamas) Mark Knowles / (Canada) Daniel Nestor

Women's doubles
- (Spain) Virginia Ruano Pascual / (Argentina) Paola Suárez

Mixed doubles
- (United States) Bob Bryan / (Russia) Vera Zvonareva

Boys' singles
- (United Kingdom) Andy Murray

Girls' singles
- (Netherlands) Michaëlla Krajicek

Boys' doubles
- (United States) Brendan Evans / (United States) Scott Oudsema

Girls' doubles
- (New Zealand) Marina Erakovic / (Netherlands) Michaëlla Krajicek
← 2003 ·	US Open	· 2005 →

The 2004 US Open was held between August 30, 2004 – September 12, 2004.

Both Andy Roddick and Justine Henin-Hardenne were unsuccessful in their title defenses, Roddick losing in the quarter-finals to Joachim Johansson and Henin-Hardenne falling in the fourth round to Nadia Petrova. On the men's side, Roger Federer won his first US Open, defeating rival and 2001 champion Lleyton Hewitt in a lopsided final. Svetlana Kuznetsova won the women's title defeating Elena Dementieva in the final.

== Seniors ==
=== Men's singles ===
(Switzerland) Roger Federer defeated (Australia) Lleyton Hewitt, 6–0, 7–6^{(7–3)}, 6–0

• It was Federer's 4th career Grand Slam singles title and his 1st title at the US Open. It was Federer's 9th title of the year, and his 20th overall.

=== Women's singles ===
(Russia) Svetlana Kuznetsova defeated (Russia) Elena Dementieva, 6–3, 7–5

• It was Kuznetsova's 1st career Grand Slam singles title.

=== Men's doubles ===
(The Bahamas) Mark Knowles / (Canada) Daniel Nestor defeated (India) Leander Paes / (Czech Republic) David Rikl, 6–3, 6–3

• It was Knowles' 2nd career Grand Slam doubles title and his 1st title at the US Open.
• It was Nestor's 2nd career Grand Slam doubles title and his 1st title at the US Open.

=== Women's doubles ===
(Spain) Virginia Ruano Pascual / (Argentina) Paola Suárez defeated (Russia) Svetlana Kuznetsova / (Russia) Elena Likhovtseva, 6–4, 7–5

• It was Ruano Pascual's 7th career Grand Slam doubles title and her 3rd and last title at the US Open.
• It was Suárez' 7th career Grand Slam doubles title and her 3rd and last title at the US Open.

=== Mixed doubles ===
(Russia) Vera Zvonareva / (United States) Bob Bryan defeated (Australia) Alicia Molik / (Australia) Todd Woodbridge, 6–3, 6–4

• It was Zvonareva's 1st career Grand Slam mixed doubles title.
• It was Bryan's 2nd career Grand Slam mixed doubles title and his 2nd (consecutive) title at the US Open.

== Juniors ==
=== Boys' singles ===
(United Kingdom) Andy Murray defeated (Ukraine) Sergiy Stakhovsky, 6–4, 6–2

=== Girls' singles ===
(Netherlands) Michaëlla Krajicek defeated (United States) Jessica Kirkland, 6–1, 6–1

=== Boys' doubles ===
(United States) Brendan Evans / (United States) Scott Oudsema defeated (Germany) Andreas Beck / (Germany) Sebastian Rieschick, 4–6, 6–1, 6–2

=== Girls' doubles ===
(New Zealand) Marina Erakovic / (Netherlands) Michaëlla Krajicek defeated (Romania) Mădălina Gojnea / (Romania) Monica Niculescu, 7–6^{(7–4)}, 6–0

== Withdrawals ==
Men's Singles

- (United States) James Blake → replaced by (Belgium) Kristof Vliegen
- (France) Julien Boutter → replaced by (Belgium) Gilles Elseneer
- (Argentina) Agustín Calleri → replaced by (Denmark) Kristian Pless
- (Argentina) Guillermo Coria → replaced by (France) Arnaud Di Pasquale
- (Australia) Scott Draper → replaced by (Argentina) Juan Mónaco
- (France) Nicolas Escudé → replaced by (Serbia and Montenegro) Janko Tipsarević
- (Netherlands) Sjeng Schalken → replaced by (Germany) Daniel Elsner
- (Netherlands) Martin Verkerk → replaced by (France) Thierry Ascione

Women's Singles

- (Belgium) Kim Clijsters → replaced by (Zimbabwe) Cara Black
- (Russia) Lina Krasnoroutskaya → replaced by (Spain) Nuria Llagostera Vives
- (France) Sandrine Testud → replaced by (France) Camille Pin

Preceded by 2004 Wimbledon Championships	Grand Slams	Succeeded by 2005 Australian Open
