= 2004 US Open – Women's doubles =

Women's doubles
- 2004 US Open

Final
- Champion: (Spain) Virginia Ruano Pascual (Argentina) Paola Suárez
- Runner-up: (Russia) Svetlana Kuznetsova (Russia) Elena Likhovtseva
- Score: 6–4, 7–5

Details
- Draw: 64 (7 WC )
- Seeds: 16

Events
Singles	men	women		boys	girls
Doubles	men	women	mixed	boys	girls
WC Singles	men	women	quad
WC Doubles	men	women	quad
Legends	men	women	mixed
← 2003 ·	US Open	· 2005 →

Virginia Ruano Pascual and Paola Suárez were the 2-time defending champions, and won in the final 6–4, 7–5, against Svetlana Kuznetsova and Elena Likhovtseva.

In the Open Era (since May 1968), Ruano Pascual and Suárez became the first two women, to win the US Open women’s doubles titles in 3 consecutive years, as well as becoming the first team to win 3 consecutive titles.

== Seeds ==
1. (Spain) Virginia Ruano Pascual / (Argentina) Paola Suárez (champions)
2. (Russia) Svetlana Kuznetsova / (Russia) Elena Likhovtseva (finals)
3. (Zimbabwe) Cara Black / (Australia) Rennae Stubbs (third round)
4. (Russia) Nadia Petrova / (United States) Meghann Shaughnessy (second round)
5. (United States) Martina Navratilova / (United States) Lisa Raymond (quarterfinals)
6. (Slovakia) Janette Husárová / (Spain) Conchita Martínez (quarterfinals)
7. (South Africa) Liezel Huber / (Thailand) Tamarine Tanasugarn (quarterfinals)
8. (Russia) Anastasia Myskina / (Russia) Vera Zvonareva (first round)
9. (France) Marion Bartoli / (Switzerland) Myriam Casanova (first round)
10. (France) Émilie Loit / (Australia) Nicole Pratt (third round)
11. (Venezuela) María Vento-Kabchi / (Indonesia) Angelique Widjaja (first round)
12. (Austria) Barbara Schett / (Switzerland) Patty Schnyder (semifinals)
13. (Australia) Alicia Molik / (Spain) Magüi Serna (first round)
14. (Italy) Silvia Farina Elia / (Italy) Francesca Schiavone (second round)
15. (Russia) Elena Dementieva / (Japan) Ai Sugiyama (semifinals)
16. (Belgium) Els Callens / (Hungary) Petra Mandula (first round)

== Draw ==
=== Key ===
- Q = Qualifier
- WC = Wild card
- LL = Lucky loser
- Alt = Alternate
- ITF = ITF entry
- PR = Protected ranking
- SR = Special ranking
- SE = Special exempt
- JE = Junior exempt
- JR = Junior Accelerator Programme entrant
- CO = College Accelerator Programme entrant
- NG = Next Gen Accelerator Program entrant
- w/o = Walkover
- r = Retired
- d = Defaulted

=== Finals ===
Quarterfinals
1	(Spain) Virginia Ruano Pascual (Argentina) Paola Suárez	6	6
6	(Slovakia) Janette Husárová (Spain) Conchita Martínez	3	3
15	(Russia) Elena Dementieva (Japan) Ai Sugiyama	4	6	6
7	(South Africa) Liezel Huber (Thailand) Tamarine Tanasugarn	6	2	4
12	(Austria) Barbara Schett (Switzerland) Patty Schnyder	6	7
(Chinese Taipei) Janet Lee (China) Peng Shuai	2	5
5	(United States) Martina Navratilova (United States) Lisa Raymond	7	6^{5}	1
2	(Russia) Svetlana Kuznetsova (Russia) Elena Likhovtseva	6^{6}	7	6

Semifinals
1	(Spain) Virginia Ruano Pascual (Argentina) Paola Suárez	w/o
15	(Russia) Elena Dementieva (Japan) Ai Sugiyama
12	(Austria) Barbara Schett (Switzerland) Patty Schnyder	4	2
2	(Russia) Svetlana Kuznetsova (Russia) Elena Likhovtseva	6	6

Finals
1	(Spain) Virginia Ruano Pascual (Argentina) Paola Suárez	6	7
2	(Russia) Svetlana Kuznetsova (Russia) Elena Likhovtseva	4	5

=== Top half ===
==== Section 1 ====
First round
1	(Spain) V Ruano Pascual (Argentina) P Suárez	6	7
(Slovakia) D Hantuchová (Russia) D Safina	3	5
(Australia) L McShea (United States) C Morariu	6	7
(Czech Republic) O Blahotová (Czech Republic) G Navrátilová	2	6^{0}
WC	(United States) A Mueller (United States) J Peterson	2	5
(United States) L Granville (Turkey) İ Şenoğlu	6	7
(Italy) ME Camerin (Venezuela) M Sequera	3	6	7
13	(Australia) A Molik (Spain) M Serna	6	2	6^{4}
11	(Venezuela) M Vento-Kabchi (Indonesia) A Widjaja	3	1
(France) C Dhenin (Croatia) S Talaja	6	6
(Spain) M Marrero (Spain) A Medina Garrigues	6	6
WC	(United States) J Jackson (United States) K McCain	2	1
WC	(United States) N Uberoi (United States) S Uberoi	4	1
(Greece) E Daniilidou (Slovenia) K Srebotnik	6	6
WC	(United States) J Kirkland (United States) L Lee-Waters	6	6^{7}	0
6	(Slovakia) J Husárová (Spain) C Martínez	4	7	6

Second round
1	(Spain) V Ruano Pascual (Argentina) P Suárez	6	6
(Australia) L McShea (United States) C Morariu	2	4
(United States) L Granville (Turkey) İ Şenoğlu	7	6
(Italy) ME Camerin (Venezuela) M Sequera	5	2
(France) C Dhenin (Croatia) S Talaja	6	6
(Spain) M Marrero (Spain) A Medina Garrigues	4	3
(Greece) E Daniilidou (Slovenia) K Srebotnik	7	2	4
6	(Slovakia) J Husárová (Spain) C Martínez	5	6	6

Third round
1	(Spain) V Ruano Pascual (Argentina) P Suárez	6	3
(United States) L Granville (Turkey) İ Şenoğlu	2	4
(France) C Dhenin (Croatia) S Talaja	6^{5}	6	2
6	(Slovakia) J Husárová (Spain) C Martínez	7	3	6

Quarterfinals
1	(Spain) V Ruano Pascual (Argentina) P Suárez	6	6
6	(Slovakia) J Husárová (Spain) C Martínez	3	3

==== Section 2 ====
First round
3	(Zimbabwe) C Black (Australia) R Stubbs	6	6
WC	(United States) L Osterloh (United States) S Perry	3	4
(Croatia) J Kostanić (Luxembourg) C Schaul	7	6
(France) S Beltrame (Italy) R Vinci	5	3
(Hungary) Z Gubacsi (Hungary) K Nagy	6	2	1
(Sweden) Å Svensson (United States) M Tu	4	6	6
(United States) J Russell (Italy) M Santangelo	1	7	5
15	(Russia) E Dementieva (Japan) A Sugiyama	6	6^{3}	7
10	(France) É Loit (Australia) N Pratt	6	6
(United States) J Lehnhoff (Australia) C Wheeler	3	4
(Bosnia and Herzegovina) M Jugić-Salkić (Russia) G Voskoboeva	6	3	6
(Japan) S Asagoe (Japan) R Fujiwara	1	6	1
(China) Yan Zi (China) Zheng Jie	6	7
(Argentina) G Dulko (Argentina) P Tarabini	1	5
(Russia) A Rodionova (Austria) P Wartusch	1	6	2
7	(South Africa) L Huber (Thailand) T Tanasugarn	6	4	6

Second round
3	(Zimbabwe) C Black (Australia) R Stubbs	6	6
(Croatia) J Kostanić (Luxembourg) C Schaul	1	1
(Sweden) Å Svensson (United States) M Tu	1	3
15	(Russia) E Dementieva (Japan) A Sugiyama	6	6
10	(France) É Loit (Australia) N Pratt	5	6	6
(Bosnia and Herzegovina) M Jugić-Salkić (Russia) G Voskoboeva	7	1	4
(China) Yan Zi (China) Zheng Jie	7	4	3
7	(South Africa) L Huber (Thailand) T Tanasugarn	5	6	6

Third round
3	(Zimbabwe) C Black (Australia) R Stubbs	2	4
15	(Russia) E Dementieva (Japan) A Sugiyama	6	6
10	(France) É Loit (Australia) N Pratt	4	6	3
7	(South Africa) L Huber (Thailand) T Tanasugarn	6	2	6

Quarterfinals
15	(Russia) E Dementieva (Japan) A Sugiyama	4	6	6
7	(South Africa) L Huber (Thailand) T Tanasugarn	6	2	4

=== Bottom half ===
==== Section 3 ====
First round
8	(Russia) A Myskina (Russia) V Zvonareva
WC	(United States) A Cohen (Philippines) R Zalameda	w/o
(United States) B Mattek (United States) A Spears	6	5	4
(United States) J Hopkins (United States) M Washington	4	7	6
(Czech Republic) M Paštiková (Germany) J Wöhr	6	4	3
(France) S Cohen-Aloro (Spain) C Martínez Granados	4	6	6
(Italy) A Serra Zanetti (Italy) A Serra Zanetti	4	3
12	(Austria) B Schett (Switzerland) P Schnyder	6	6
16	(Belgium) E Callens (Hungary) P Mandula	1	1
(United States) J Craybas (Germany) M Weingärtner	6	6
(Italy) T Garbin (Slovenia) T Križan	7	6
(United States) T Ashley (Ukraine) E Tatarkova	5	4
(Chinese Taipei) J Lee (China) Peng Shuai	7	6
(Spain) N Llagostera Vives (Spain) A Parra Santonja	6^{3}	3
(Ukraine) Y Beygelzimer (Belarus) T Poutchek	1	4
4	(Russia) N Petrova (United States) M Shaughnessy	6	6

Second round
WC	(United States) A Cohen (Philippines) R Zalameda	6	1	2
(United States) J Hopkins (United States) M Washington	3	6	6
(France) S Cohen-Aloro (Spain) C Martínez Granados	1	2
12	(Austria) B Schett (Switzerland) P Schnyder	6	6
(United States) J Craybas (Germany) M Weingärtner	7	3	4
(Italy) T Garbin (Slovenia) T Križan	6^{11}	6	6
(Chinese Taipei) J Lee (China) Peng Shuai	4	6	6
4	(Russia) N Petrova (United States) M Shaughnessy	6	1	4

Third round
(United States) J Hopkins (United States) M Washington	6^{6}	6^{5}
12	(Austria) B Schett (Switzerland) P Schnyder	7	7
(Italy) T Garbin (Slovenia) T Križan	6	1	6^{9}
(Chinese Taipei) J Lee (China) Peng Shuai	4	6	7

Quarterfinals
12	(Austria) B Schett (Switzerland) P Schnyder	6	7
(Chinese Taipei) J Lee (China) Peng Shuai	2	5

==== Section 4 ====
First round
5	(United States) M Navratilova (United States) L Raymond	6	6
(United States) J Ditty (United States) S Reeves	3	2
WC	(United States) L Fisher (United States) R Kops-Jones	6^{3}	3
(Czech Republic) I Benešová (Czech Republic) E Birnerová	7	6
Alt	(Australia) C Dellacqua (Australia) N Sewell	3	1	r
(Australia) B Stewart (Australia) S Stosur	6	1
(United States) A Cargill (Japan) N Miyagi	6	6
9	(France) M Bartoli (Switzerland) M Casanova	4	2
14	(Italy) S Farina Elia (Italy) F Schiavone	6	5	6
(Russia) A Jidkova (Romania) A Vanc	2	7	4
(Czech Republic) D Chládková (Czech Republic) L Průšová	1	5
(Italy) R Grande (Italy) F Pennetta	6	7
(Switzerland) E Gagliardi (Germany) A-L Grönefeld	7	6
(Slovakia) L Kurhajcová (Slovakia) H Nagyová	5	2
(Estonia) M Ani (Ukraine) T Perebiynis	2	5
2	(Russia) S Kuznetsova (Russia) E Likhovtseva	6	7

Second round
5	(United States) M Navratilova (United States) L Raymond	6	2	7
(Czech Republic) I Benešová (Czech Republic) E Birnerová	3	6	5
(Australia) B Stewart (Australia) S Stosur	6	2	6
(United States) A Cargill (Japan) N Miyagi	3	6	4
14	(Italy) S Farina Elia (Italy) F Schiavone	4	3
(Italy) R Grande (Italy) F Pennetta	6	6
(Switzerland) E Gagliardi (Germany) A-L Grönefeld	4	2
2	(Russia) S Kuznetsova (Russia) E Likhovtseva	6	6

Third round
5	(United States) M Navratilova (United States) L Raymond	6	6
(Australia) B Stewart (Australia) S Stosur	4	3
(Italy) R Grande (Italy) F Pennetta	2	r
2	(Russia) S Kuznetsova (Russia) E Likhovtseva	6

Quarterfinals
5	(United States) M Navratilova (United States) L Raymond	7	6^{5}	1
2	(Russia) S Kuznetsova (Russia) E Likhovtseva	6^{6}	7	6
