= 2004 US Open – Boys' singles =

Boys' singles
- 2004 US Open

Final
- Champion: (United Kingdom) Andy Murray
- Runner-up: (Ukraine) Sergiy Stakhovsky
- Score: 6–4, 6–2

Events
Singles	men	women		boys	girls
Doubles	men	women	mixed	boys	girls
WC Singles	men	women	quad
WC Doubles	men	women	quad
Legends	men	women	mixed
- US Open

Jo-Wilfried Tsonga was the defending champion, but turned professional during this season.

Gaël Monfils would have been the first junior to achieve a calendar Grand Slam since Stefan Edberg in 1983 but lost in the third round to Viktor Troicki.

Andy Murray won the title by defeating Sergiy Stakhovsky 6–4, 6–2 in the final. It was the 1st and only Grand Slam title in his Juniors career. Murray would go on to win the senior title in his maiden Grand Slam title eight years later.

== Seeds ==
1. (France) Gaël Monfils (third round)
2. (Germany) Andreas Beck (semifinals)
3. (United Kingdom) Andy Murray (champion)
4. (United States) Alex Kuznetsov (second round)
5. (United States) Brendan Evans (second round)
6. (Argentina) Eduardo Schwank (third round)
7. (Ukraine) Sergiy Stakhovsky (final)
8. (Germany) Mischa Zverev (semifinals)
9. (Germany) Sebastian Rieschick (first round)
10. (United States) Scoville Jenkins (quarterfinals)
11. (United States) Scott Oudsema (third round)
12. (Spain) Pablo Andújar (first round)
13. (India) Karan Rastogi (first round)
14. (Netherlands) Igor Sijsling (first round)
15. (Italy) Fabio Fognini (second round)
16. (Serbia and Montenegro) Viktor Troicki (quarterfinals)

== Draw ==
Key

- Q = Qualifier
- WC = Wild card
- LL = Lucky loser
- Alt = Alternate
- ITF = ITF entry
- PR = Protected ranking
- SR = Special ranking
- SE = Special exempt
- JE = Junior exempt
- JR = Junior Accelerator Programme entrant
- CO = College Accelerator Programme entrant
- NG = Next Gen Accelerator Program entrant
- w/o = Walkover
- r = Retired
- d = Defaulted

=== Finals ===
Quarterfinals
16	(Serbia and Montenegro) Viktor Troicki	5	0
8	(Germany) Mischa Zverev	7	6
3	(United Kingdom) Andy Murray	2	7^{7}	6
WC	(United States) Sam Querrey	6	6^{2}	1
7	(Ukraine) Sergiy Stakhovsky	6	7^{7}
Q	(Russia) Evgeny Kirillov	0	6^{3}
10	(United States) Scoville Jenkins	3	6^{5}
2	(Germany) Andreas Beck	6	7^{7}

Semifinals
8	(Germany) Mischa Zverev	3	2
3	(United Kingdom) Andy Murray	6	6
7	(Ukraine) Sergiy Stakhovsky	6	7
2	(Germany) Andreas Beck	4	5

Final
3	(United Kingdom) Andy Murray	6	6
7	(Ukraine) Sergiy Stakhovsky	4	2

=== Top half ===
==== Section 1 ====
First round
1	(France) Gaël Monfils	4	6	6
(Netherlands) Remko de Rijke	6	3	4
(United States) Phillip Simmonds	6	7
Q	(India) Navdeep Singh	4	5
Q	(South Africa) Fritz Wolmarans	2	6	6
(El Salvador) Rafael Arévalo	6	1	2
(Denmark) Martin Pedersen	6^{6}	2
16	(Serbia and Montenegro) Viktor Troicki	7^{8}	6
11	(United States) Scott Oudsema	4	6	6
(Ukraine) Sergei Bubka	6	3	2
(Italy) Andrea Arnaboldi	3	5
(United Kingdom) Tom Rushby	6	7
(Czech Republic) Dušan Lojda	2	4
(Croatia) Franko Škugor	6	6
WC	(United States) Jean-Yves Aubone	5	0
8	(Germany) Mischa Zverev	7	6

Second round
1	(France) G Monfils	7	0	6
(United States) P Simmonds	5	6	2
Q	(South Africa) F Wolmarans	6	4	4
16	(Serbia and Montenegro) V Troicki	1	6	6
11	(United States) S Oudsema	6	7
(United Kingdom) T Rushby	4	5
(Croatia) F Škugor	6^{3}	6	4
8	(Germany) M Zverev	7^{7}	4	6

Third round
1	(France) G Monfils	4	2
16	(Serbia and Montenegro) V Troicki	6	6
11	(United States) S Oudsema	1	6^{9}
8	(Germany) M Zverev	6	7^{11}

Quarterfinals
16	(Serbia and Montenegro) V Troicki	5	0
8	(Germany) M Zverev	7	6

==== Section 2 ====
First round
3	(United Kingdom) Andy Murray	6	6
(Argentina) Juan Martín del Potro	0	1
(United States) Vahid Mirzadeh	4	7^{7}	6
Q	(Netherlands) Antal van der Duim	6	6^{5}	1
(New Zealand) William Ward	6	6
SE	(Ukraine) Alexandr Dolgopolov	3	3
WC	(United States) Tim Smyczek	6	6
13	(India) Karan Rastogi	1	3
9	(Germany) Sebastian Rieschick	4	4
Q	(Croatia) Marin Čilić	6	6
WC	(United States) Sam Querrey	6	6
WC	(United States) Jamie Hunt	3	4
(Italy) Gianluca Naso	3	6	3
(Netherlands) Coen van Keulen	6	3	6
WC	(United States) Dennis Lajola	1	3
5	(United States) Brendan Evans	6	6

Second round
3	(United Kingdom) A Murray	6	6
(United States) V Mirzadeh	1	2
(New Zealand) W Ward	2	6	6
WC	(United States) T Smyczek	6	3	1
Q	(Croatia) M Čilić	7	3	6^{4}
WC	(United States) S Querrey	5	6	7^{7}
(Netherlands) C van Keulen	7^{7}	4	6
5	(United States) B Evans	6^{3}	6	4

Third round
3	(United Kingdom) A Murray	6	6
(New Zealand) W Ward	1	2
WC	(United States) S Querrey	4	7^{7}	7
(Netherlands) C van Keulen	6	6^{5}	5

Quarterfinals
3	(United Kingdom) A Murray	2	7^{7}	6
WC	(United States) S Querrey	6	6^{2}	1

=== Bottom half ===
==== Section 3 ====
First round
7	(Ukraine) Sergiy Stakhovsky	6	1	7^{7}
WC	(United States) Donald Young	3	6	6^{5}
Q	(Canada) Érik Chvojka	6	3	6^{4}
(France) Jérémy Chardy	3	6	7^{7}
(Chinese Taipei) Yi Chu-huan	5	7^{10}	3
(Belgium) Niels Desein	7	6^{8}	6
LL	(Croatia) Antonio Veić	7	7^{7}
12	(Spain) Pablo Andújar	5	6^{3}
15	(Italy) Fabio Fognini	7	6
(Germany) Dominik Müller	5	3
Q	(Russia) Evgeny Kirillov	6	6
(India) Tushar Liberhan	2	2
WC	(United States) Marcus Fugate	3	6	3
(United Kingdom) Miles Kasiri	6	4	6
(Netherlands) Robin Haase	6^{4}	0
4	(United States) Alex Kuznetsov	7^{7}	6

Second round
7	(Ukraine) S Stakhovsky	6	6
(France) J Chardy	4	3
(Belgium) N Desein	3	6	5
LL	(Croatia) A Veić	6	3	7
15	(Italy) F Fognini	4	1
Q	(Russia) E Kirillov	6	6
(United Kingdom) M Kasiri	6	7^{7}
4	(United States) A Kuznetsov	4	6^{5}

Third round
7	(Ukraine) S Stakhovsky	6	6
LL	(Croatia) A Veić	0	4
Q	(Russia) E Kirillov	6	6
(United Kingdom) M Kasiri	4	0

Quarterfinals
7	(Ukraine) S Stakhovsky	6	7^{7}
Q	(Russia) E Kirillov	0	6^{3}

==== Section 4 ====
First round
6	(Argentina) Eduardo Schwank	6	7
Q	(United States) Gregory Ouellette	4	5
WC	(United States) Alex Clayton	1	3
(United Kingdom) Jamie Murray	6	6
(Germany) Steven Moneke	7^{8}	5	2
SE	(United States) Timothy Neilly	6^{6}	7	6
(India) Divij Sharan	4	1
10	(United States) Scoville Jenkins	6	6
14	(Netherlands) Igor Sijsling	3	5
(United Kingdom) Jamie Baker	6	7
(Ukraine) Aleksandr Nedovyesov	6	4	6
Q	(Croatia) Jurica Grbusic	3	6	3
(New Zealand) G. D. Jones	4	6	6
(United States) Nikita Kryvonos	6	4	0
(South Africa) Kevin Anderson	1	2
2	(Germany) Andreas Beck	6	6

Second round
6	(Argentina) E Schwank	7	7
(United Kingdom) J Murray	5	5
SE	(United States) T Neilly	2	3
10	(United States) S Jenkins	6	6
(United Kingdom) J Baker	7^{11}	6
(Ukraine) A Nedovyesov	6^{9}	4
(New Zealand) GD Jones	2	1
2	(Germany) A Beck	6	6

Third round
6	(Argentina) E Schwank	0	2
10	(United States) S Jenkins	6	6
(United Kingdom) J Baker	2	3
2	(Germany) A Beck	6	6

Quarterfinals
10	(United States) S Jenkins	3	6^{5}
2	(Germany) A Beck	6	7^{7}
