= 2004 US Open – Mixed doubles =

Tennis tournament

Mixed doubles
- 2004 US Open

Final
- Champion: (Russia) Vera Zvonareva (United States) Bob Bryan
- Runner-up: (Australia) Alicia Molik (Australia) Todd Woodbridge
- Score: 6–3, 6–4

Details
- Draw: 32
- Seeds: 8

Events
Singles	men	women		boys	girls
Doubles	men	women	mixed	boys	girls
WC Singles	men	women	quad
WC Doubles	men	women	quad
Legends	men	women	mixed
- US Open

Defending champion Bob Bryan and his partner Vera Zvonareva defeated Alicia Molik and Todd Woodbridge in the final, 6–3, 6–4 to win the mixed doubles tennis title at the 2004 US Open.

Katarina Srebotnik and Bryan were the reigning champions, but Srebtonik did not compete this year.

== Seeds ==
1. (Australia) Rennae Stubbs / (Canada) Daniel Nestor (semifinal)
2. (Zimbabwe) Cara Black / (Zimbabwe) Wayne Black (second round)
3. (United States) Lisa Raymond / (India) Mahesh Bhupathi (second round)
4. (Russia) Vera Zvonareva / (United States) Bob Bryan (champions)
5. (Russia) Elena Likhovtseva / (Serbia and Montenegro) Nenad Zimonjić (Quarterfinal)
6. (Japan) Ai Sugiyama / (Zimbabwe) Kevin Ullyett (second round)
7. (Spain) Virginia Ruano Pascual / (United States) Jared Palmer (second round)
8. (United States) Martina Navratilova / (India) Leander Paes (semifinal)

== Draw ==
Key

- Q = Qualifier
- WC = Wild card
- LL = Lucky loser
- Alt = Alternate
- ITF = ITF entry
- PR = Protected ranking
- SR = Special ranking
- SE = Special exempt
- JE = Junior exempt
- JR = Junior Accelerator Programme entrant
- CO = College Accelerator Programme entrant
- NG = Next Gen Accelerator Program entrant
- w/o = Walkover
- r = Retired
- d = Defaulted

=== Finals ===
Semifinals
1	(Australia) Rennae Stubbs (Canada) Daniel Nestor	5	3
4	(Russia) Vera Zvonareva (United States) Bob Bryan	7	6
(Australia) Alicia Molik (Australia) Todd Woodbridge	4	6	[10]
8	(United States) Martina Navratilova (India) Leander Paes	6	3	[3]

Final
4	(Russia) Vera Zvonareva (United States) Bob Bryan	6	6
(Australia) Alicia Molik (Australia) Todd Woodbridge	3	4

=== Top half ===
First round
1	(Australia) R Stubbs (Canada) D Nestor	6	6
WC	(United States) L Granville (United States) S Lipsky	4	3
(Australia) L McShea (Czech Republic) C Suk	1	6	[10]
(South Africa) L Huber (Israel) J Erlich	6	4	[7]
(Spain) C Martínez (Argentina) S Prieto	3	2
(Sweden) A Svensson (Sweden) J Björkman	6	6
(Slovakia) J Husárová (Czech Republic) L Friedl	4	7^{7}	[6]
6	(Japan) A Sugiyama (Zimbabwe) K Ullyett	6	6^{4}	[10]
4	(Russia) V Zvonareva (United States) B Bryan	6	6
(Australia) N Pratt (Czech Republic) P Vizner	3	4
WC	(United States) C Rubin (United States) S Humphries	6	4	[10]
WC	(United States) V King (Israel) G Weiner	2	6	[7]
(Switzerland) M Casanova (South Africa) C Haggard	4	7^{7}	[8]
(Switzerland) E Gagliardi (Argentina) G Etlis	6	6^{3}	[10]
WC	(United States) J Peterson (United States) P Simmonds	2	4
7	(Spain) V Ruano Pascual (United States) J Palmer	6	6

Second round
1	(Australia) R Stubbs (Canada) D Nestor	6	6
(Australia) L McShea (Czech Republic) C Suk	3	2
(Sweden) A Svensson (Sweden) J Björkman	3	6	[10]
6	(Japan) A Sugiyama (Zimbabwe) K Ullyett	6	0	[6]
4	(Russia) V Zvonareva (United States) B Bryan	7^{9}	6
WC	(United States) C Rubin (United States) S Humphries	6^{7}	4
(Switzerland) E Gagliardi (Argentina) G Etlis	6	7^{7}
7	(Spain) V Ruano Pascual (United States) J Palmer	2	5^{5}

Quarterfinals
1	(Australia) R Stubbs (Canada) D Nestor	7	6
(Sweden) A Svensson (Sweden) J Björkman	5	2
4	(Russia) V Zvonareva (United States) B Bryan	6	6
(Switzerland) E Gagliardi (Argentina) G Etlis	4	3

Semifinals
1	(Australia) R Stubbs (Canada) D Nestor	5	3
4	(Russia) V Zvonareva (United States) B Bryan	7	6

=== Bottom half ===
First round
5	(Russia) E Likhovtseva (Serbia and Montenegro) N Zimonjic	7	6
(Austria) B Schett (Austria) J Knowle	5	4
WC	(United States) C Morariu (United States) D Johnson	4	4
WC	(United States) A Stevenson (United States) R Leach	6	6
(Australia) A Molik (Australia) T Woodbridge	6	6
(Switzerland) P Schnyder (Australia) T Perry	4	1
(Hungary) P Mandula (Australia) P Hanley	4	2
3	(United States) L Raymond (India) M Bhupathi	6	6
8	(United States) M Navratilova (India) L Paes	6	7^{7}
(Slovakia) D Hantuchová (The Bahamas) M Knowles	1	6^{5}
(Venezuela) M Vento-Kabchi (Argentina) M Hood	6	3	[6]
Alt	(Belgium) E Callens (Czech Republic) M Damm	4	6	[10]
(Israel) A Smashnova- Pistolesi (Israel) A Ram	4	4
(Russia) M Sharapova (Belarus) M Mirnyi	6	6
(Indonesia) A Widjaja (Argentina) M Rodríguez	4	2
2	(Zimbabwe) C Black (Zimbabwe) W Black	6	6

Second round
5	(Russia) E Likhovtseva (Serbia and Montenegro) N Zimonjic	6	6
WC	(United States) A Stevenson (United States) R Leach	1	4
(Australia) A Molik (Australia) T Woodbridge	7^{7}	7^{7}
3	(United States) L Raymond (India) M Bhupathi	6^{1}	6^{3}
8	(United States) M Navratilova (India) L Paes	6	6
Alt	(Belgium) E Callens (Czech Republic) M Damm	3	4
(Russia) M Sharapova (Belarus) M Mirnyi	6	7^{7}
2	(Zimbabwe) C Black (Zimbabwe) W Black	3	6^{4}

Quarterfinals
5	(Russia) E Likhovtseva (Serbia and Montenegro) N Zimonjic	6^{7}	6^{6}
(Australia) A Molik (Australia) T Woodbridge	7^{9}	7^{8}
8	(United States) M Navratilova (India) L Paes	6	6
(Russia) M Sharapova (Belarus) M Mirnyi	4	4

Semifinals
(Australia) A Molik (Australia) T Woodbridge	4	6	[10]
8	(United States) M Navratilova (India) L Paes	6	3	[3]
