= 2004 US Open – Girls' singles =

Girls' singles
- 2004 US Open

Final
- Champion: (Netherlands) Michaëlla Krajicek
- Runner-up: (United States) Jessica Kirkland
- Score: 6–1, 6–1

Events
Singles	men	women		boys	girls
Doubles	men	women	mixed	boys	girls
WC Singles	men	women	quad
WC Doubles	men	women	quad
Legends	men	women	mixed
- US Open

Kirsten Flipkens was the defending champion, but did not compete in the juniors that year.

Michaëlla Krajicek won the tournament, defeating Jessica Kirkland in the final, 6–1, 6–1.

== Seeds ==
1. (Ukraine) Kateryna Bondarenko (quarterfinals)
2. (Israel) Shahar Pe'er (semifinals)
3. (Netherlands) Michaëlla Krajicek (champion)
4. (United States) Jessica Kirkland (final)
5. (Switzerland) Timea Bacsinszky (third round)
6. (Chinese Taipei) Yung-Jan Chan (second round)
7. (Belarus) Victoria Azarenka (semifinals)
8. (Belarus) Olga Govortsova (quarterfinals)
9. (Romania) Monica Niculescu (quarterfinals)
10. (New Zealand) Marina Erakovic (quarterfinals)
11. (Czech Republic) Veronika Chvojková (first round)
12. (Russia) Irina Kotkina (third round)
13. (Hungary) Ágnes Szávay (third round)
14. (Romania) Mădălina Gojnea (third round)
15. (Russia) Alisa Kleybanova (second round)
16. (Canada) Aleksandra Wozniak (third round)

== Draw ==
Key

- Q = Qualifier
- WC = Wild card
- LL = Lucky loser
- Alt = Alternate
- ITF = ITF entry
- PR = Protected ranking
- SR = Special ranking
- SE = Special exempt
- JE = Junior exempt
- JR = Junior Accelerator Programme entrant
- CO = College Accelerator Programme entrant
- NG = Next Gen Accelerator Program entrant
- w/o = Walkover
- r = Retired
- d = Defaulted

=== Finals ===
Quarterfinals
1	(Ukraine) Kateryna Bondarenko	0	0^{r}
7	(Belarus) Victoria Azarenka	6	1
3	(Netherlands) Michaëlla Krajicek	6	6
10	(New Zealand) Marina Erakovic	4	3
9	(Romania) Monica Niculescu	0	3
4	(United States) Jessica Kirkland	6	6
8	(Belarus) Olga Govortsova	3	2
2	(Israel) Shahar Pe'er	6	6

Semifinals
7	(Belarus) Victoria Azarenka	6	6^{5}	4
3	(Netherlands) Michaëlla Krajicek	1	7^{7}	6
4	(United States) Jessica Kirkland	6	4	6
2	(Israel) Shahar Pe'er	2	6	2

Final
3	(Netherlands) Michaëlla Krajicek	6	6
4	(United States) Jessica Kirkland	1	1

=== Top half ===
==== Section 1 ====
First round
1	(Ukraine) Kateryna Bondarenko	6	6
(United States) Krystina Marcio	4	4
(Sweden) Michaela Johansson	7	6
WC	(United States) Sarah Fansler	5	2
(Italy) Giulia Gabba	6^{3}	2
(Serbia and Montenegro) Vojislava Lukić	7^{7}	6
(Slovenia) Ana Jerman	2	6	3
15	(Russia) Alisa Kleybanova	6	4	6
11	(Czech Republic) Veronika Chvojková	4	4
Q	(Romania) Mihaela Buzărnescu	6	6
(Poland) Marta Leśniak	4	6	0
WC	(United States) Jessica Nguyen	6	4	6
(Canada) Stéphanie Dubois	6	6
(Germany) Vanessa Pinto	0	3
WC	(United States) Elizabeth Kobak	3	5
7	(Belarus) Victoria Azarenka	6	7

Second round
1	(Ukraine) K Bondarenko	6	7
(Sweden) M Johansson	3	5
(Serbia and Montenegro) V Lukić	6	7
15	(Russia) A Kleybanova	4	5
Q	(Romania) M Buzărnescu	7	6
WC	(United States) J Nguyen	5	3
(Canada) S Dubois	2	2
7	(Belarus) V Azarenka	6	6

Third round
1	(Ukraine) K Bondarenko	4	6	6
(Serbia and Montenegro) V Lukić	6	3	3
Q	(Romania) M Buzărnescu	2	2
7	(Belarus) V Azarenka	6	6

Quarterfinals
1	(Ukraine) K Bondarenko	0	0^{r}
7	(Belarus) V Azarenka	6	1

==== Section 2 ====
First round
3	(Netherlands) Michaëlla Krajicek	6	6
(Japan) Ayumi Morita	0	4
Q	(Russia) Olga Puchkova	6	7
(Bolivia) Maria-Fernanda Alvarez-Teran	2	5
Q	(Poland) Magdalena Kiszczyńska	6	6
(Argentina) Florencia Molinero	0	3
Q	(Canada) Sharon Fichman	1	1
14	(Romania) Mădălina Gojnea	6	6
10	(New Zealand) Marina Erakovic	6	6
(Germany) Maraike Biglmaier	2	2
(Russia) Regina Kulikova	6	6
WC	(United States) Jennifer Stevens	2	1
(Russia) Ekaterina Kosminskaya	6	7^{9}
WC	(United States) Andrea Remynse	2	6^{7}
(United States) Julia Cohen	1	1
6	(Chinese Taipei) Chan Yung-jan	6	6

Second round
3	(Netherlands) M Krajicek	6	7
Q	(Russia) O Puchkova	3	5
Q	(Poland) M Kiszczyńska	6^{5}	2
14	(Romania) M Gojnea	7^{7}	6
10	(New Zealand) M Erakovic	6	7^{7}
(Russia) R Kulikova	1	6^{5}
(Russia) E Kosminskaya	4	6	2
6	(Chinese Taipei) Y-j Chan	6	3	0^{r}

Third round
3	(Netherlands) M Krajicek	6	6
14	(Romania) M Gojnea	4	4
10	(New Zealand) M Erakovic	6	6
(Russia) E Kosminskaya	3	1

Quarterfinals
3	(Netherlands) M Krajicek	6	6
10	(New Zealand) M Erakovic	4	3

=== Bottom half ===
==== Section 3 ====
First round
5	(Switzerland) Timea Bacsinszky	6	6
(Egypt) Magy Aziz	0	1
(Slovakia) Dominika Cibulková	7^{7}	6
(Netherlands) Bibiane Schoofs	6^{3}	0
(Russia) Evgeniya Rodina	6	6
WC	(United States) Neha Uberoi	4	1
(Chinese Taipei) I-hsuan Hwang	0	0
9	(Romania) Monica Niculescu	6	6
13	(Hungary) Ágnes Szávay	3	6	6
(South Korea) So-Jung Kim	6	2	2
(Russia) Yaroslava Shvedova	7	3	6
(Croatia) Sanja Ančić	5	6	2
(Serbia and Montenegro) Teodora Mirčić	3	2
Q	(Canada) Mélanie Gloria	6	6
(Czech Republic) Nikola Fraňková	3	3
4	(United States) Jessica Kirkland	6	6

Second round
5	(Switzerland) T Bacsinszky	5	6	7^{7}
(Slovakia) D Cibulková	7	4	6^{3}
(Russia) E Rodina	0	2
9	(Romania) M Niculescu	6	6
13	(Hungary) Á Szávay	7^{7}	2	6
(Russia) Y Shvedova	6^{1}	6	1
Q	(Canada) M Gloria	6^{6}	1
4	(United States) J Kirkland	7^{8}	6

Third round
5	(Switzerland) T Bacsinszky	6	2	0
9	(Romania) M Niculescu	3	6	6
13	(Hungary) Á Szávay	3	6^{6}
4	(United States) J Kirkland	6	7^{8}

Quarterfinals
9	(Romania) M Niculescu	0	3
4	(United States) J Kirkland	6	6

==== Section 4 ====
First round
8	(Belarus) Olga Govortsova	6	4	6
(United States) Mary Gambale	2	6	3
WC	(United States) Lindsay Burdette	7^{8}	2	6
Q	(Denmark) Caroline Wozniacki	6^{6}	6	2
Q	(United States) Vania King	6	6
(United States) Yasmin Schnack	3	2
WC	(United States) Ellah Nze	1	3
12	(Russia) Irina Kotkina	6	6
16	(Canada) Aleksandra Wozniak	6	6
(Germany) Tatjana Malek	1	2
(Romania) Ágnes Szatmári	3	4
(United States) Alexa Glatch	6	6
(Netherlands) Nicole Thyssen	1	6	4
(Italy) Verdiana Verardi	6	2	6
Q	(Austria) Tamira Paszek	5	3
2	(Israel) Shahar Pe'er	7	6

Second round
8	(Belarus) O Govortsova	6	6
WC	(United States) L Burdette	0	1
Q	(United States) V King	5	3
12	(Russia) I Kotkina	7	6
16	(Canada) A Wozniak	7^{7}	6
(United States) A Glatch	6^{0}	0
(Italy) Verdiana Verardi	4	3
2	(Israel) S Pe'er	6	6

Third round
8	(Belarus) O Govortsova	7	6
12	(Russia) I Kotkina	5	1
16	(Canada) A Wozniak	6	2	4
2	(Israel) S Pe'er	3	6	6

Quarterfinals
8	(Belarus) O Govortsova	3	2
2	(Israel) S Pe'er	6	6

== Sources ==
- Draw
