= Jessica Kirkland =

American tennis player (born 1987)

- Country (sports): United States
- Residence: Miami, Florida, United States
- Born: November 10, 1987 (age 38) Dayton, Ohio, United States
- Height: 1.75 m (5 ft 9 in)
- Turned pro: 2002
- Retired: 2009
- Plays: Right-handed (two-handed backhand)
- Prize money: US$187,373

Singles
- Career record: 83–80
- Career titles: 0 WTA, 3 ITF
- Highest ranking: No. 151 (21 March 2005)

Grand Slam singles results
- Australian Open: 1R (2005)
- French Open: Q2 (2006)
- Wimbledon: Q2 (2005, 2006)
- US Open: 1R (2004, 2005, 2006)

Doubles
- Career record: 14–27
- Career titles: 0 WTA, 1 ITF
- Highest ranking: No. 269 (16 April 2007)

Grand Slam doubles results
- US Open: 1R (2004, 2005, 2006)

Jessica Kirkland (born November 10, 1987) is a former professional tennis player from the United States. In her career, Kirkland won a total of four ITF titles, of which three were in singles and one in doubles. As a junior, she was runner-up in singles at the 2004 US Open and was ranked No. 1 junior in the world in 2005. Her highest ranking on the WTA Tour was world No. 151 in March 2005.

== Career ==
Kirkland started playing tennis at the age of four. In 2004 Kirkland won the Girls'18-and-under singles title at the Orange Bowl held at Crandon Park in Key Biscayne, Florida after a straight sets win in the final against Alla Kudryavtseva. Kirkland's career highlight was reaching the fourth round of the Tier I Pacific Life Open at Indian Wells in March 2005, beating No. 22 seeded Marion Bartoli in straight sets en route. Her biggest ITF title came when she won the singles of the $50,000 event at Carson, California, in June 2007.

== Junior Grand Slam finals ==
=== Girls' singles: 1 (1 runner–up) ===
Result	Year	Tournament	Surface	Opponent	Score
Loss	2004	US Open	Hard	(Netherlands) Michaëlla Krajicek	1–6, 1–6

== ITF Circuit finals ==
=== Singles: 4 (3 title, 1 runner–ups) ===
Legend $100,000 tournaments $80,000 tournaments $60,000 tournaments $25,000 tournaments $15,000 tournaments	Finals by surface Hard (3–1) Clay (0–0) Grass (0–0) Carpet (0–0)

Result	W–L	Date	Tournament	Tier	Surface	Opponent	Score
Win	1–0	Apr 2004	ITF Poza Rica, Mexico	25,000	Hard	(Portugal) Frederica Piedade	6–1, 6–2
Win	2–0	May 2004	ITF Coatzacoalcos, Mexico	25,000	Hard	(Spain) Laura Pous Tió	6–0, 6–4
Loss	2–1	Jan 2006	ITF Waikoloa, United States	50,000	Hard	(United States) Lilia Osterloh	4–6, 1–6
Win	3–1	Jun 2007	ITF Carson, United States	50,000	Hard	(United States) Lauren Albanese	7–6^{(7–2)}, 6–2

=== Doubles: 2 (1 title, 1 runner-up) ===
Legend $100,000 tournaments $80,000 tournaments $60,000 tournaments $25,000 tournaments $15,000 tournaments	Finals by surface Hard (0–1) Clay (1–0) Grass (0–0) Carpet (0–0)

Result	W–L	Date	Tournament	Tier	Surface	Partner	Opponents	Score
Win	1–0	May 2006	ITF Indian Harbor Beach, United States	50,000	Clay	(Romania) Edina Gallovits-Hall	(Brazil) Maria Fernanda Alves (Canada) Stéphanie Dubois	6–3, 6–2
Loss	1–1	Apr 2007	ITF Putignano, Italy	25,000	Hard	(Germany) Carmen Klaschka	(Slovenia) Andreja Klepač (Romania) Monica Niculescu	2–6, 5–7

== Performance timelines ==
Key
W	F	SF	QF	#R	RR	Q#	DNQ	A	NH

(W) winner; (F) finalist; (SF) semifinalist; (QF) quarterfinalist; (#R) rounds 4, 3, 2, 1; (RR) round-robin stage; (Q#) qualification round; (DNQ) did not qualify; (A) absent; (NH) not held; (SR) strike rate (events won / competed); (W–L) win–loss record.
To avoid confusion and double counting, these charts are updated at the conclusion of a tournament or when the player's participation has ended.

Only main-draw results in WTA Tour, Grand Slam tournaments, Billie Jean King Cup and Olympic Games are included in win–loss records.

=== Singles ===
Tournament	2003	2004	2005	2006	2007	SR	W–L	Win%
Grand Slam tournaments
Australian Open	A	A	1R	Q2	Q1	0 / 1	0–1	0%
French Open	A	A	Q1	Q2	A	0 / 0	0–0	–
Wimbledon	A	A	Q2	Q2	A	0 / 0	0–0	–
US Open	Q1	1R	1R	1R	A	0 / 3	0–3	0%
Win–loss	0–0	0–1	0–2	0–1	0–0	0 / 4	0–4	–
WTA 1000
Indian Wells	1R	A	4R	2R	Q1	0 / 3	4–3	57%
Miami Open	A	Q2	1R	A	A	0 / 1	0–1	0%
Cincinnati Open	A	A	1R	1R	A	0 / 2	0–2	0%
Win–loss	0–1	0–0	3–3	1–2	0–0	0 / 6	4–6	40%

Sporting positions
Preceded by (Czech Republic) Nicole Vaidišová	Orange Bowl Girls' Singles Champion; Category: 18 and under 2004	Succeeded by (Denmark) Caroline Wozniacki
