= 2006 Challenge Bell – Singles =

Singles
- 2006 Challenge Bell

Final
- Champion: (France) Marion Bartoli
- Runner-up: (Russia) Olga Poutchkova
- Score: 6–0, 6–0

Details
- Draw: 32
- Seeds: 8

Events
Singles	Doubles
- Tournoi de Québec

Amy Frazier was the defending champion, but decided not to participate this year.

Marion Bartoli won the title, defeating Olga Poutchkova 6–0, 6–0 in the final.

== Seeds ==
1. (Serbia) Jelena Janković (quarterfinals)
2. (France) Marion Bartoli (champion)
3. (Sweden) Sofia Arvidsson (first round)
4. (France) Séverine Brémond (semifinals)
5. (Austria) Sybille Bammer (second round)
6. (United States) Shenay Perry (quarterfinals)
7. (United States) Jamea Jackson (first round)
8. (Russia) Olga Poutchkova (final)

== Draw ==
Key

- Q = Qualifier
- WC = Wild card
- LL = Lucky loser
- Alt = Alternate
- ITF = ITF entry
- PR = Protected ranking
- SR = Special ranking
- SE = Special exempt
- JE = Junior exempt
- JR = Junior Accelerator Programme entrant
- CO = College Accelerator Programme entrant
- NG = Next Gen Accelerator Program entrant
- w/o = Walkover
- r = Retired
- d = Defaulted

=== Finals ===
Semifinals
8	(Russia) Olga Poutchkova	2	6	7
4	(France) Séverine Brémond	6	0	5
Q	(United States) Lilia Osterloh	6	3	1
2	(France) Marion Bartoli	3	6	6

Final
8	(Russia) Olga Poutchkova	0	0
2	(France) Marion Bartoli	6	6

=== Top half ===
First round
1	(Serbia) J Janković	6	6
(Venezuela) M Sequera	1	3
(Uzbekistan) V Lepchenko	6	3	4
(United States) V King	2	6	6
Q	(Romania) IR Olaru	7^{7}	3	4
Q	(Germany) T Ostertag	6^{4}	6	6
WC	(Canada) V Tétreault	0	2
8	(Russia) O Poutchkova	6	6
4	(France) S Brémond	6	3	6
(United States) J Craybas	4	6	4
WC	(Canada) S Dubois	3	3
Q	(Germany) G Arn	6	6
(United States) C Rubin	4	2
(Slovakia) M Suchá	6	6
(Belarus) V Azarenka	6	2	1
5	(Austria) S Bammer	2	6	6

Second round
1	(Serbia) J Janković	4	6	6
(United States) V King	6	1	4
Q	(Germany) T Ostertag	7	1	2
8	(Russia) O Poutchkova	5	6	6
4	(France) S Brémond	6	6
Q	(Germany) G Arn	1	4
(Slovakia) M Suchá	7	6
5	(Austria) S Bammer	5	4

Quarterfinals
1	(Serbia) J Janković	6	4	1^{r}
8	(Russia) O Poutchkova	2	6	3
4	(France) S Brémond	6	6
(Slovakia) M Suchá	1	4

Semifinals
8	(Russia) O Poutchkova	2	6	7
4	(France) S Brémond	6	0	5

=== Bottom half ===
First round
7	(United States) J Jackson	2	1^{r}
(Russia) A Rodionova	6	2
WC	(Canada) M-È Pelletier	5	6	3
Q	(United States) L Osterloh	7	4	6
(Canada) A Wozniak	6	6
(Russia) A Jidkova	4	2
(United States) A Harkleroad	7^{7}	6
3	(Sweden) S Arvidsson	6^{5}	3
6	(United States) S Perry	6	3	6
(Hungary) M Czink	2	6	3
LL	(United States) A Spears	7^{8}	6^{2}	6
(Australia) N Pratt	6^{6}	7^{7}	3
(Croatia) J Kostanić	4	4
(United States) L Granville	6	6
(Russia) G Voskoboeva	1	4
2	(France) M Bartoli	6	6

Second round
(Russia) A Rodionova	4	1
Q	(United States) L Osterloh	6	6
(Canada) A Wozniak	6	6
(United States) A Harkleroad	1	4
6	(United States) S Perry	6	7
LL	(United States) A Spears	1	5
(United States) L Granville	4	3
2	(France) M Bartoli	6	6

Quarterfinals
Q	(United States) L Osterloh	6	6
(Canada) A Wozniak	3	2
6	(United States) S Perry	1	0
2	(France) M Bartoli	6	6

Semifinals
Q	(United States) L Osterloh	6	3	1
2	(France) M Bartoli	3	6	6
