= 2007 Rogers Cup – Singles =

Singles
- 2007 Rogers Cup

Final
- Champion: (Belgium) Justine Henin
- Runner-up: (Serbia) Jelena Janković
- Score: 7–6^{(7–3)}, 7–5

Details
- Draw: 56 (3WC/12Q/1LL)
- Seeds: 16

Events
Singles	Doubles
- Canadian Open

Justine Henin defeated Jelena Janković in the final, 7–6^{(7–3)}, 7–5 to win the women's singles tennis title at the 2007 Canadian Open.

Ana Ivanovic was the defending champion, but lost in the second round to Yan Zi.

== Seeds ==
The top eight seeds receive a bye into the second round.

1. (Belgium) Justine Henin (champion)
2. (Serbia) Jelena Janković (final)
3. (Russia) Svetlana Kuznetsova (quarterfinals)
4. (Serbia) Ana Ivanovic (second round)
5. (Russia) Anna Chakvetadze (second round, retired due to a viral illness)
6. (Russia) Nadia Petrova (quarterfinals)
7. (France) Marion Bartoli (quarterfinals, retired due to a viral illness)
8. (Russia) Elena Dementieva (second round)
9. (Russia) Dinara Safina (third round)
10. (Switzerland) Patty Schnyder (third round)
11. (Israel) Shahar Pe'er (third round)
12. (France) Tatiana Golovin (semifinals)
13. (Austria) Sybille Bammer (third round)
14. (Slovenia) Katarina Srebotnik (second round, retired due to a viral illness)
15. (Ukraine) Alona Bondarenko (first round)
16. (Czech Republic) Lucie Šafářová (second round)

== Draw ==
Key

- Q = Qualifier
- WC = Wild card
- LL = Lucky loser
- Alt = Alternate
- ITF = ITF entry
- PR = Protected ranking
- SR = Special ranking
- SE = Special exempt
- JE = Junior exempt
- JR = Junior Accelerator Programme entrant
- CO = College Accelerator Programme entrant
- NG = Next Gen Accelerator Program entrant
- w/o = Walkover
- r = Retired
- d = Defaulted

=== Finals ===
Quarterfinals
1	(Belgium) Justine Henin	7	6
6	(Russia) Nadia Petrova	6^{3}	3
Q	(China) Yan Zi	6	3
7	(France) Marion Bartoli	2	0^{r}
12	(France) Tatiana Golovin	2	7	6
3	(Russia) Svetlana Kuznetsova	6	5	1
(France) Virginie Razzano	5	2
2	(Serbia) Jelena Janković	7	6

Semifinals
1	(Belgium) Justine Henin	6	6
Q	(China) Yan Zi	3	0
12	(France) Tatiana Golovin	7	3	2
2	(Serbia) Jelena Janković	5	6	6

Final
1	(Belgium) Justine Henin	7	7
2	(Serbia) Jelena Janković	6^{3}	5

=== Top half ===
==== Section 1 ====
First round
Q	(Slovenia) A Klepač	6	6
(United States) M Tu	3	1
Q	(Denmark) C Wozniacki	0	7	2
(China) S Peng	6	6^{4}	6
(Ukraine) K Bondarenko	7	2	2
14	(Slovenia) K Srebotnik	5	6	6
10	(Switzerland) P Schnyder	6	6
(Spain) A Medina Garrigues	3	2
(Russia) O Poutchkova	3	5
Q	(Italy) F Pennetta	6	7
WC	(Canada) S Dubois	6^{5}	6	7
(Japan) A Sugiyama	7	4	5

Second round
1	(Belgium) J Henin	6	6
Q	(Slovenia) A Klepač	3	1
(China) S Peng	6	4
14	(Slovenia) K Srebotnik	1	2^{r}
10	(Switzerland) P Schnyder	6	6
Q	(Italy) F Pennetta	3	2
WC	(Canada) S Dubois	7	2	1
6	(Russia) N Petrova	6^{4}	6	6

Third round
1	(Belgium) J Henin	7	6
(China) S Peng	5	2
10	(Switzerland) P Schnyder	4	1
6	(Russia) N Petrova	6	6

Quarterfinals
1	(Belgium) J Henin	7	6
6	(Russia) N Petrova	6^{4}	3

==== Section 2 ====
First round
(France) S Brémond	4	0
Q	(China) Yan Zi	6	6
(Greece) E Daniilidou	6	6
(Argentina) G Dulko	2	3
Q	(Italy) ME Camerin	6	6
15	(Ukraine) A Bondarenko	4	3
9	(Russia) D Safina	7	3	7
Q	(France) C Pin	6^{9}	6	5
(France) N Dechy	6	7
Q	(Switzerland) E Gagliardi	4	5
(Russia) M Kirilenko	6	6
(Germany) M Müller	1	3

Second round
4	(Serbia) A Ivanovic	3	1
Q	(China) Yan Zi	6	6
(Greece) E Daniilidou	7	4	7
Q	(Italy) ME Camerin	6^{5}	6	5
9	(Russia) D Safina	6	6
(France) N Dechy	1	2
(Russia) M Kirilenko	2	1^{r}
7	(France) M Bartoli	6	2

Third round
Q	(China) Yan Zi	6	5	7
(Greece) E Daniilidou	3	7	6^{5}
9	(Russia) D Safina	2	7	0
7	(France) M Bartoli	6	6^{2}	6

Quarterfinals
Q	(China) Yan Zi	6	3
7	(France) M Bartoli	2	0^{r}

=== Bottom half ===
==== Section 3 ====
First round
(Italy) F Schiavone	6	2	6
(Austria) T Paszek	2	6	3
Q	(Slovakia) D Cibulková	6	6
Q	(Germany) A Bachmann	2	4
(Ukraine) J Vakulenko	2	1
12	(France) T Golovin	6	6
16	(Czech Republic) L Šafářová	6	6^{2}	6
Q	(Uzbekistan) V Lepchenko	2	7	1
(United States) M Shaughnessy	6	7
(Italy) M Santangelo	4	6^{3}
(Spain) N Llagostera Vives	0	0
(Italy) R Vinci	6	6

Second round
8	(Russia) E Dementieva	7	3	2
(Italy) F Schiavone	6^{5}	6	6
Q	(Slovakia) D Cibulková	4	3
12	(France) T Golovin	6	6
16	(Czech Republic) L Šafářová	6	4	5
(United States) M Shaughnessy	3	6	7
(Italy) R Vinci	2	6^{7}
3	(Russia) S Kuznetsova	6	7

Third round
(Italy) F Schiavone	2	0
12	(France) T Golovin	6	6
(United States) M Shaughnessy	3	2
3	(Russia) S Kuznetsova	6	6

Quarterfinals
12	(France) T Golovin	2	7	6
3	(Russia) S Kuznetsova	6	5	1

==== Section 4 ====
First round
(France) A Rezaï	4	6	3
(France) V Razzano	6	4	6
(Italy) T Garbin	6	6
LL	(United States) L Granville	2	0
(Netherlands) M Krajicek	5	6^{7}
11	(Israel) S Pe'er	7	7
13	(Austria) S Bammer	6	6
(France) É Loit	1	2
Q	(Russia) A Rodionova	4	0^{r}
WC	(Canada) A Wozniak	6	5
WC	(Canada) M-È Pelletier	5	6	6
Q	(Canada) E Shulaeva	7	4	2

Second round
5	(Russia) A Chakvetadze	6^{5}	0^{r}
(France) V Razzano	7	2
(Italy) T Garbin	3	2
11	(Israel) S Pe'er	6	6
13	(Austria) S Bammer	6	6
WC	(Canada) A Wozniak	4	2
WC	(Canada) M-È Pelletier	0	1
2	(Serbia) J Janković	6	6

Third round
(France) V Razzano	6	6
11	(Israel) S Pe'er	4	3
13	(Austria) S Bammer	2	3
2	(Serbia) J Janković	6	6

Quarterfinals
(France) V Razzano	5	2
2	(Serbia) J Janković	7	6

== Qualifying ==
=== Qualifying seeds ===
1. (United States) Laura Granville (qualifying competition, lucky loser)
2. (France) ~~Aravane Rezaï~~ (moved to the main draw)
3. (Germany) Angelique Kerber (first round)
4. (Slovakia) Dominika Cibulková (qualified)
5. (Australia) ~~Alicia Molik~~ (still playing at Los Angeles)
6. (Italy) Maria Elena Camerin (qualified)
7. (Belarus) ~~Tatiana Poutchek~~ (withdrew)
8. (Denmark) Caroline Wozniacki (qualified)
9. (Russia) Anastasia Rodionova (qualified)
10. (Spain) Virginia Ruano Pascual (first round)
11. (Italy) Flavia Pennetta (qualified)
12. (Romania) Raluca Olaru (qualifying competition)
13. (Croatia) Jelena Kostanić Tošić (qualifying competition)
14. (Czech Republic) Iveta Benešová (qualifying competition)
15. (France) Stéphanie Cohen-Aloro (first round)
16. (France) Camille Pin (qualified)
17. (Israel) Tzipora Obziler (qualifying competition)
18. (Germany) Gréta Arn (qualifying competition)
19. (Ukraine) Olga Savchuk (first round)
20. (Italy) Sara Errani (first round)
21. (Slovakia) Jarmila Gajdošová (qualifying competition)
22. (Uzbekistan) Akgul Amanmuradova (qualifying competition)
23. (France) Youlia Fedossova (first round)
24. (Italy) Alberta Brianti (first round)
25. (Argentina) Jorgelina Cravero (first round)

=== Qualifiers ===
1. (Germany) Angelika Bachmann
2. (Canada) Ekaterina Shulaeva
3. (Uzbekistan) Varvara Lepchenko
4. (Slovakia) Dominika Cibulková
5. (Slovenia) Andreja Klepač
6. (Italy) Maria Elena Camerin
7. (Switzerland) Emmanuelle Gagliardi
8. (Denmark) Caroline Wozniacki
9. (Russia) Anastasia Rodionova
10. (China) Yan Zi
11. (Italy) Flavia Pennetta
12. (France) Camille Pin

=== Lucky loser ===
1. (United States) Laura Granville

=== Qualifying draw ===
==== First qualifier ====
First round
1	(United States) Laura Granville	6	6
WC	(Canada) Mélanie Gloria	2	0
(Germany) Angelika Bachmann	6	7^{7}
23	(France) Youlia Fedossova	3	6^{3}

Qualifying competition
1	(United States) Laura Granville	4	6^{1}
(Germany) Angelika Bachmann	6	7^{7}

==== Second qualifier ====
First round
25	(Argentina) Jorgelina Cravero	5	6^{4}
WC	(Canada) Ekaterina Shulaeva	7	7^{7}
WC	(Canada) Valérie Tétreault	2	2
22	(Uzbekistan) Akgul Amanmuradova	6	6

Qualifying competition
WC	(Canada) Ekaterina Shulaeva	7^{7}	6
22	(Uzbekistan) Akgul Amanmuradova	6^{4}	3

==== Third qualifier ====
First round
3	(Germany) Angelique Kerber	6	0	0
(Uzbekistan) Varvara Lepchenko	1	6	6
(France) Stéphanie Foretz	2	4
17	(Israel) Tzipora Obziler	6	6

Qualifying competition
(Uzbekistan) Varvara Lepchenko	6	6
17	(Israel) Tzipora Obziler	3	3

==== Fourth qualifier ====
First round
4	(Slovakia) Dominika Cibulková	6	6
(United States) Jamea Jackson	1	3
WC	(Canada) Sharon Fichman	6	7^{7}
15	(France) Stéphanie Cohen-Aloro	3	6^{4}

Qualifying competition
4	(Slovakia) Dominika Cibulková	6	6
WC	(Canada) Sharon Fichman	3	1

==== Fifth qualifier ====
First round
Alt	(Argentina) Betina Jozami	1	2
(Slovenia) Andreja Klepač	6	6
(United Kingdom) Anne Keothavong	3	0
18	(Germany) Gréta Arn	6	6

Qualifying competition
(Slovenia) Andreja Klepač	6	2	7^{7}
18	(Germany) Gréta Arn	4	6	6^{5}

==== Sixth qualifier ====
First round
6	(Italy) Maria Elena Camerin	6	6
(United Kingdom) Katie O'Brien	4	0
(Tunisia) Selima Sfar	6	7^{8}
24	(Italy) Alberta Brianti	2	6^{6}

Qualifying competition
6	(Italy) Maria Elena Camerin	7	6
(Tunisia) Selima Sfar	5	1

==== Seventh qualifier ====
First round
Alt	(Belarus) Iryna Kuryanovich	3	2
(Switzerland) Emmanuelle Gagliardi	6	6
(China) Sun Tiantian	4	3
13	(Croatia) Jelena Kostanić Tošić	6	6

Qualifying competition
(Switzerland) Emmanuelle Gagliardi	6	6
13	(Croatia) Jelena Kostanić Tošić	3	3

==== Eighth qualifier ====
First round
8	(Denmark) Caroline Wozniacki	6	6
WC	(Canada) Gabriela Dabrowski	0	3
(Czech Republic) Hana Šromová	6	6
19	(Ukraine) Olga Savchuk	2	4

Qualifying competition
8	(Denmark) Caroline Wozniacki	6	6
(Czech Republic) Hana Šromová	3	3

==== Ninth qualifier ====
First round
9	(Russia) Anastasia Rodionova	6	2
(Hungary) Melinda Czink	4	1^{r}
WC	(United States) Mallory Cecil	4	3
14	(Czech Republic) Iveta Benešová	6	6

Qualifying competition
9	(Russia) Anastasia Rodionova	7	6
14	(Czech Republic) Iveta Benešová	5	2

==== Tenth qualifier ====
First round
10	(Spain) Virginia Ruano Pascual	5	4
Alt	(China) Yan Zi	7	6
(Russia) Galina Voskoboeva	2	6	6
20	(Italy) Sara Errani	6	4	2

Qualifying competition
Alt	(China) Yan Zi	6	1	7^{7}
(Russia) Galina Voskoboeva	4	6	6^{4}

==== Eleventh qualifier ====
First round
11	(Italy) Flavia Pennetta	6	6
(France) Mathilde Johansson	4	4
(Germany) Julia Schruff	6^{3}	4
21	(Slovakia) Jarmila Gajdošová	7^{7}	6

Qualifying competition
11	(Italy) Flavia Pennetta	6	6
21	(Slovakia) Jarmila Gajdošová	3	3

==== Twelfth qualifier ====
First round
12	(Romania) Raluca Olaru	6	6
(Czech Republic) Eva Birnerová	2	1
(Russia) Alina Jidkova	6	0	2
16	(France) Camille Pin	3	6	6

Qualifying competition
12	(Romania) Raluca Olaru	6^{6}	2
16	(France) Camille Pin	7^{8}	6
