= 2005 Challenge Bell – Singles =

Singles
- 2005 Challenge Bell

Final
- Champion: (United States) Amy Frazier
- Runner-up: (Sweden) Sofia Arvidsson
- Score: 6–1, 7–5

Details
- Draw: 32
- Seeds: 8

Events
Singles	Doubles
- Tournoi de Québec

Martina Suchá was the defending champion, but decided not to participate this year.

Amy Frazier won the title, defeating Sofia Arvidsson 6–1, 7–5 in the final.

== Seeds ==
1. (France) Nathalie Dechy (semifinals)
2. (Slovakia) Daniela Hantuchová (withdrew)
3. (France) Marion Bartoli (semifinals)
4. (United States) Laura Granville (second round)
5. (Italy) Antonella Serra Zanetti (second round)
6. (United States) Amy Frazier (champion)
7. (United States) Jamea Jackson (first round)
8. (Sweden) Sofia Arvidsson (final)
9. (Germany) Julia Schruff (second round)

== Draw ==
Key

- Q = Qualifier
- WC = Wild card
- LL = Lucky loser
- Alt = Alternate
- ITF = ITF entry
- PR = Protected ranking
- SR = Special ranking
- SE = Special exempt
- JE = Junior exempt
- JR = Junior Accelerator Programme entrant
- CO = College Accelerator Programme entrant
- NG = Next Gen Accelerator Program entrant
- w/o = Walkover
- r = Retired
- d = Defaulted

=== Finals ===
Semifinals
1	(France) Nathalie Dechy	4	5
6	(United States) Amy Frazier	6	7
8	(Sweden) Sofia Arvidsson	6	1
3	(France) Marion Bartoli	4	0^{r}

Final
6	(United States) Amy Frazier	6	7
8	(Sweden) Sofia Arvidsson	1	5

=== Top half ===
First round
1	(France) N Dechy	6	6
(United States) A Harkleroad	4	1
(Argentina) ME Salerni	7^{11}	1	6
LL	(United States) D Ospina	6^{9}	6	3
(Russia) A Rodionova	7	6
(Canada) M-È Pelletier	5	4
WC	(Canada) S Dubois	7	6
7	(United States) J Jackson	5	4
4	(United States) L Granville	6	6
Q	(United States) A Cargill	4	2
(Slovakia) H Nagyová	6	2	6
(Croatia) J Kostanić	3	6	4
Q	(France) Y Fedossova	6	6
(Puerto Rico) K Brandi	4	2
WC	(Canada) A Wozniak	4	6	6^{6}
6	(United States) A Frazier	6	3	7^{8}

Second round
1	(France) N Dechy	6	7^{7}
(Argentina) ME Salerni	1	6^{5}
(Russia) A Rodionova	6	4	2
WC	(Canada) S Dubois	3	6	6
4	(United States) L Granville	2	5
(Slovakia) H Nagyová	6	7
Q	(France) Y Fedossova	3	0
6	(United States) A Frazier	6	6

Quarterfinals
1	(France) N Dechy	2	6	6
WC	(Canada) S Dubois	6	0	0
(Slovakia) H Nagyová	4	1
6	(United States) A Frazier	6	6

Semifinals
1	(France) N Dechy	4	5
6	(United States) A Frazier	6	7

=== Bottom half ===
First round
8	(Sweden) S Arvidsson	6	7
Q	(Puerto Rico) V Castellvi	2	5
(Czech Republic) M Paštiková	0	4
(United Kingdom) A Keothavong	6	6
(France) S Brémond	3	6^{1}
(Russia) E Vesnina	6	7^{7}
(France) C Pin	6	1	5
5	(Italy) A Serra Zanetti	1	6	7
9	(Germany) J Schruff	7	6
(United States) A Spears	5	3
LL	(Slovakia) Ľ Kurhajcová	2	6	5
(United States) S Perry	6	4	7
(Finland) E Laine	6	6
Q	(United Kingdom) S Borwell	4	1
(Germany) S Kloesel	1	2
3	(France) M Bartoli	6	6

Second round
8	(Sweden) S Arvidsson	6	6
(United Kingdom) A Keothavong	3	1
(Russia) E Vesnina	6	6
5	(Italy) A Serra Zanetti	3	3
9	(Germany) J Schruff	6^{4}	3
(United States) S Perry	7^{7}	6
(Finland) E Laine	6	1	5
3	(France) M Bartoli	2	6	7

Quarterfinals
8	(Sweden) S Arvidsson	2	6	6
(Russia) E Vesnina	6	4	1
(United States) S Perry	0	4
3	(France) M Bartoli	6	6

Semifinals
8	(Sweden) S Arvidsson	6	1
3	(France) M Bartoli	4	0^{r}
