= 2007 Challenge Bell – Doubles =

Doubles
- 2007 Challenge Bell

Final
- Champions: (United States) Christina Fusano (United States) Raquel Kops-Jones
- Runners-up: (Canada) Stéphanie Dubois (Czech Republic) Renata Voráčová
- Score: 6–2, 7–6^{(8–6)}

Details
- Draw: 16
- Seeds: 4

Events
Singles	Doubles
← 2006 ·	Tournoi de Québec	· 2008 →

Carly Gullickson and Laura Granville were the defending champions, but decided not to participate this year.

Christina Fusano and Raquel Kops-Jones won the title, defeating Stéphanie Dubois and Renata Voráčová 6–2, 7–6^{(8–6)} in the final.

== Seeds ==
1. (United States) Meilen Tu / (Russia) Vera Zvonareva (quarterfinals)
2. (France) Séverine Brémond / (United States) Jill Craybas (first round)
3. (Canada) Stéphanie Dubois / (Czech Republic) Renata Voráčová (final)
4. (United States) Julie Ditty / (United States) Ashley Harkleroad (first round)

== Draw ==
=== Key ===
- Q = Qualifier
- WC = Wild card
- LL = Lucky loser
- Alt = Alternate
- SE = Special exempt
- PR = Protected ranking
- ITF = ITF entry
- JE = Junior exempt
- w/o = Walkover
- r = Retired
- d = Defaulted
- SR = Special ranking

First round
1	(United States) M Tu (Russia) V Zvonareva	6	6
(Sweden) S Arvidsson (United States) A Haynes	3	2
(Argentina) J Cravero (Ukraine) Y Fedak	2	4
(Brazil) MF Alves (Argentina) B Jozami	6	6
4	(United States) J Ditty (United States) A Harkleroad	2	6	[6]
(United States) C Fusano (United States) R Kops-Jones	6	1	[10]
WC	(Canada) E Shulaeva (Canada) A Wozniak	2	4
(Czech Republic) E Hrdinová (Canada) M-È Pelletier	6	6
(Russia) A Jidkova (Russia) Y Shvedova	6	6
(France) S Foretz (Luxembourg) A Kremer	3	1
(Colombia) C Castaño (United States) A Spears	3	4
3	(Canada) S Dubois (Czech Republic) R Voráčová	6	6
(India) S Rao (Australia) C Wheeler	6	7^{7}
(Estonia) M Ani (Slovenia) A Klepač	4	6^{3}
(Germany) A Bachmann (Latvia) L Dekmeijere	6	7^{8}
2	(France) S Brémond (United States) J Craybas	4	6^{6}

Quarterfinals
1	(United States) M Tu (Russia) V Zvonareva	3	6	[3]
(Brazil) MF Alves (Argentina) B Jozami	6	4	[10]
(United States) C Fusano (United States) R Kops-Jones	6	6
(Czech Republic) E Hrdinová (Canada) M-È Pelletier	3	4
(Russia) A Jidkova (Russia) Y Shvedova	4	7^{7}	[6]
3	(Canada) S Dubois (Czech Republic) R Voráčová	6	6^{5}	[10]
(India) S Rao (Australia) C Wheeler	3	6	[10]
(Germany) A Bachmann (Latvia) L Dekmeijere	6	1	[5]

Semifinals
(Brazil) MF Alves (Argentina) B Jozami	3	4
(United States) C Fusano (United States) R Kops-Jones	6	6
3	(Canada) S Dubois (Czech Republic) R Voráčová	6	6
(India) S Rao (Australia) C Wheeler	1	3

Final
(United States) C Fusano (United States) R Kops-Jones	6	7^{8}
3	(Canada) S Dubois (Czech Republic) R Voráčová	2	6^{6}
