= 2007 Challenge Bell – Singles =

Singles
- 2007 Challenge Bell

Final
- Champion: (United States) Lindsay Davenport
- Runner-up: (Ukraine) Julia Vakulenko
- Score: 6–4, 6–1

Details
- Draw: 32
- Seeds: 8

Events
Singles	Doubles
- Tournoi de Québec

Marion Bartoli was the defending champion, but decided not to participate this year.

Lindsay Davenport won the title, defeating Julia Vakulenko 6–4, 6–1 in the final.

== Seeds ==
1. (Czech Republic) Nicole Vaidišová (first round)
2. (Russia) Vera Zvonareva (semifinals)
3. (Ukraine) Julia Vakulenko (final)
4. (United States) Meilen Tu (first round)
5. (Belarus) Olga Govortsova (quarterfinals)
6. (France) Alizé Cornet (first round)
7. (Germany) Angelique Kerber (first round)
8. (Russia) Olga Poutchkova (quarterfinals)

== Draw ==
Key

- Q = Qualifier
- WC = Wild card
- LL = Lucky loser
- Alt = Alternate
- ITF = ITF entry
- PR = Protected ranking
- SR = Special ranking
- SE = Special exempt
- JE = Junior exempt
- JR = Junior Accelerator Programme entrant
- CO = College Accelerator Programme entrant
- NG = Next Gen Accelerator Program entrant
- w/o = Walkover
- r = Retired
- d = Defaulted

=== Finals ===
Semifinals
(United States) Julie Ditty	1	6	5
3	(Ukraine) Julia Vakulenko	6	4	7
WC	(United States) Lindsay Davenport	6	6^{3}	6
2	(Russia) Vera Zvonareva	2	7^{7}	3

Final
3	(Ukraine) Julia Vakulenko	4	1
WC	(United States) Lindsay Davenport	6	6

=== Top half ===
First round
1	(Czech Republic) N Vaidišová	6	3	0^{r}
(Czech Republic) R Voráčová	2	6	0
(Luxembourg) A Kremer	2	1
(United States) V King	6	6
(Estonia) M Ani	6	2	6
LL	(Slovenia) A Klepač	2	6	1
Q	(United States) J Ditty	7	6
6	(France) A Cornet	5	3
3	(Ukraine) J Vakulenko	6	6
(Paraguay) R de los Ríos	2	0
Q	(United States) A Spears	1	4
WC	(Canada) S Dubois	6	6
LL	(Russia) A Jidkova	6	5	6
(United States) S Rao	4	7	4
(Argentina) J Cravero	4	3
5	(Belarus) O Govortsova	6	6

Second round
(Czech Republic) R Voráčová	2	6	4
(United States) V King	6	4	6
(Estonia) M Ani	3	3
Q	(United States) J Ditty	6	6
3	(Ukraine) J Vakulenko	6	2	7
WC	(Canada) S Dubois	1	6	5
LL	(Russia) A Jidkova	3	0^{r}
5	(Belarus) O Govortsova	6	5

Quarterfinals
(United States) V King	4	6	4
Q	(United States) J Ditty	6	3	6
3	(Ukraine) J Vakulenko	6	6
5	(Belarus) O Govortsova	3	2

Semifinals
Q	(United States) J Ditty	1	6	5
3	(Ukraine) J Vakulenko	6	4	7

=== Bottom half ===
First round
7	(Germany) A Kerber	3	3
WC	(United States) L Davenport	6	6
(Canada) A Wozniak	6	6
(United States) A Harkleroad	4	2
(Russia) Y Shvedova	3	4
(France) S Foretz	6	6
Q	(Sweden) S Arvidsson	6	6
4	(United States) M Tu	2	2
8	(Russia) O Poutchkova	6	6
Q	(New Zealand) M Erakovic	1	2
(United States) J Craybas	6	2	6
(United States) L Osterloh	4	6	2
WC	(Canada) M-È Pelletier	2	3
(France) S Brémond	6	6
(Colombia) C Castaño	2	4
2	(Russia) V Zvonareva	6	6

Second round
WC	(United States) L Davenport	6	6
(Canada) A Wozniak	1	0
(France) S Foretz	1	6	7
Q	(Sweden) S Arvidsson	6	2	5
8	(Russia) O Poutchkova	6	6
(United States) J Craybas	2	3
(France) S Brémond	3	6^{6}
2	(Russia) V Zvonareva	6	7^{8}

Quarterfinals
WC	(United States) L Davenport	6	6
(France) S Foretz	4	0
8	(Russia) O Poutchkova	2	1
2	(Russia) V Zvonareva	6	6

Semifinals
WC	(United States) L Davenport	6	6^{3}	6
2	(Russia) V Zvonareva	2	7^{7}	3
