= 2005 Challenge Bell – Doubles =

Doubles
- 2005 Challenge Bell

Final
- Champions: (Russia) Anastasia Rodionova (Russia) Elena Vesnina
- Runners-up: (Latvia) Līga Dekmeijere (United States) Ashley Harkleroad
- Score: 6–7^{(4–7)}, 6–4, 6–2

Details
- Draw: 16
- Seeds: 4

Events
Singles	Doubles
← 2004 ·	Tournoi de Québec	· 2006 →

Carly Gullickson and María Emilia Salerni were the defending champions, but Gullickson decided not to participate this year. Salerni partnered with Marion Bartoli, but withdrew from their semifinal match against Līga Dekmeijere and Ashley Harkleroad.

Anastasia Rodionova and Elena Vesnina won the title, defeating Dekmeijere and Harkleroad 6–7^{(4–7)}, 6–4, 6–2 in the final.

== Seeds ==
1. (France) Marion Bartoli / (Argentina) María Emilia Salerni (semifinals)
2. (Croatia) Jelena Kostanić / (Czech Republic) Michaela Paštiková (semifinals)
3. (Germany) Sandra Kloesel / (Germany) Julia Schruff (first round)
4. (Latvia) Līga Dekmeijere / (United States) Ashley Harkleroad (final)

== Draw ==
=== Key ===
- Q = Qualifier
- WC = Wild card
- LL = Lucky loser
- Alt = Alternate
- SE = Special exempt
- PR = Protected ranking
- ITF = ITF entry
- JE = Junior exempt
- w/o = Walkover
- r = Retired
- d = Defaulted
- SR = Special ranking

First round
1	(France) M Bartoli (Argentina) ME Salerni	6	6
(Canada) S Dubois (Canada) M-È Pelletier	1	2
(United Kingdom) A Keothavong (United Kingdom) K Paterson	6^{5}	7^{8}	7
(United States) L Barnikow (Puerto Rico) V Castellvi	7^{7}	6^{6}	5
4	(Latvia) L Dekmeijere (United States) A Harkleroad	7	6
(Germany) A Matic (Netherlands) S Noorlander	5	4
(Ukraine) O Antypina (Finland) E Laine	5	6	2
(France) S Brémond (Slovakia) H Nagyová	7	4	6
Q	(United States) V King (France) C Pin	6	2^{r}
(Sweden) S Arvidsson (Italy) A Serra Zanetti	3	5
(Russia) A Rodionova (Russia) E Vesnina	6	6
3	(Germany) S Kloesel (Germany) J Schruff	4	4
WC	(Canada) M Gloria (Canada) A Wozniak	4	0
(United States) A Frazier (United States) J Jackson	6	6
(Argentina) M-J Argeri (Brazil) L Sobral	3	4
2	(Croatia) J Kostanić (Czech Republic) M Paštiková	6	6

Quarterfinals
1	(France) M Bartoli (Argentina) ME Salerni	6	6
(United Kingdom) A Keothavong (United Kingdom) K Paterson	1	3
4	(Latvia) L Dekmeijere (United States) A Harkleroad	6	6
(France) S Brémond (Slovakia) H Nagyová	1	3
(Sweden) S Arvidsson (Italy) A Serra Zanetti
(Russia) A Rodionova (Russia) E Vesnina	w/o
(United States) A Frazier (United States) J Jackson	1	0^{r}
2	(Croatia) J Kostanić (Czech Republic) M Paštiková	6	0

Semifinals
1	(France) M Bartoli (Argentina) ME Salerni
4	(Latvia) L Dekmeijere (United States) A Harkleroad	w/o
(Russia) A Rodionova (Russia) E Vesnina	3	6	6
2	(Croatia) J Kostanić (Czech Republic) M Paštiková	6	0	3

Final
4	(Latvia) L Dekmeijere (United States) A Harkleroad	7^{7}	4	2
(Russia) A Rodionova (Russia) E Vesnina	6^{4}	6	6
