= 2006 Challenge Bell – Doubles =

Doubles
- 2006 Challenge Bell

Final
- Champions: (United States) Carly Gullickson (United States) Laura Granville
- Runners-up: (United States) Jill Craybas (Russia) Alina Jidkova
- Score: 6–3, 6–4

Details
- Draw: 16
- Seeds: 4

Events
Singles	Doubles
← 2005 ·	Tournoi de Québec	· 2007 →

Anastasia Rodionova and Elena Vesnina were the defending champions, but Vesnina decided not to participate this year. Rodionova partnered with Galina Voskoboeva, but lost in the first round to Neha Uberoi and Shikha Uberoi.

Carly Gullickson and Laura Granville won the title, defeating Jill Craybas and Alina Jidkova 6–3, 6–4 in the final.

== Seeds ==
1. (Russia) Anastasia Rodionova / (Russia) Galina Voskoboeva (first round)
2. (United States) Vania King / (Croatia) Jelena Kostanić (semifinals)
3. (Belarus) Victoria Azarenka / (Australia) Nicole Pratt (semifinals)
4. (United States) Julie Ditty / (Venezuela) Milagros Sequera (first round)

== Draw ==
=== Key ===
- Q = Qualifier
- WC = Wild card
- LL = Lucky loser
- Alt = Alternate
- SE = Special exempt
- PR = Protected ranking
- ITF = ITF entry
- JE = Junior exempt
- w/o = Walkover
- r = Retired
- d = Defaulted
- SR = Special ranking

First round
1	(Russia) A Rodionova (Russia) G Voskoboeva	6	6^{6}	3
(United States) N Uberoi (India) S Uberoi	4	7^{8}	6
(United States) L Granville (United States) C Gullickson	6	6
(United States) A Haynes (Hungary) Á Szávay	4	2
3	(Belarus) V Azarenka (Australia) N Pratt	6	6
(Germany) A Bachmann (United States) L Osterloh	0	3
WC	(Canada) H El Tabakh (Canada) V Tétreault	2	4
(United States) C Fusano (United States) A Tsoubanos	6	6
(Canada) M Drake (Canada) A Wozniak	6^{6}	6	5
(United States) J Craybas (Russia) A Jidkova	7^{8}	3	7
(Austria) S Bammer (Hungary) M Czink	6^{2}	7	6
4	(United States) J Ditty (Venezuela) M Sequera	7^{7}	5	3
(Canada) M-È Pelletier (United States) A Spears	2	6	4
Q	(Uzbekistan) V Lepchenko (Russia) O Poutchkova	6	3	6
(Sweden) S Arvidsson (Canada) S Dubois	1	6^{7}
2	(United States) V King (Croatia) J Kostanić	6	7^{9}

Quarterfinals
(United States) N Uberoi (India) S Uberoi	0	1
(United States) L Granville (United States) C Gullickson	6	6
3	(Belarus) V Azarenka (Australia) N Pratt	6	6
(United States) C Fusano (United States) A Tsoubanos	2	2
(United States) J Craybas (Russia) A Jidkova	7^{8}	7^{7}
(Austria) S Bammer (Hungary) M Czink	6^{6}	6^{5}
Q	(Uzbekistan) V Lepchenko (Russia) O Poutchkova	1	2
2	(United States) V King (Croatia) J Kostanić	6	6

Semifinals
(United States) L Granville (United States) C Gullickson	4	6	6
3	(Belarus) V Azarenka (Australia) N Pratt	6	3	0
(United States) J Craybas (Russia) A Jidkova	7^{11}	6
2	(United States) V King (Croatia) J Kostanić	6^{9}	1

Final
(United States) L Granville (United States) C Gullickson	6	6
(United States) J Craybas (Russia) A Jidkova	3	4
