= 2011 Porsche Tennis Grand Prix – Singles qualifying =

This article displays the qualifying draw of the 2011 Porsche Tennis Grand Prix.

== Players ==
=== Seeds ===
1. (Russia) Anna Chakvetadze (qualified)
2. (Japan) Kimiko Date-Krumm (second round)
3. (Austria) Tamira Paszek (qualified)
4. (Croatia) Mirjana Lučić (first round)
5. (Romania) Sorana Cîrstea (withdrew)
6. (United States) Jamie Hampton (qualified)
7. (Austria) Yvonne Meusburger (second round)
8. (Slovakia) Zuzana Kučová (qualifying competition) (lucky loser)

=== Qualifiers ===
1. (Russia) Anna Chakvetadze
2. (Netherlands) Michaëlla Krajicek
3. (Austria) Tamira Paszek
4. (United States) Jamie Hampton

=== Lucky losers ===
1. (Slovakia) Zuzana Kučová
2. (Spain) Beatriz García Vidagany

== Qualifying draw ==
=== First qualifier ===
First round
1	(Russia) Anna Chakvetadze	6	6
WC	(Germany) Julia Kimmelmann	3	3
(Russia) Regina Kulikova	6	6
(Slovakia) Michaela Pochabová	3	1
(Ukraine) Mariya Koryttseva	6	6
(Germany) Kathrin Wörle	1	2
(Russia) Vitalia Diatchenko	6^{4}	6	6
Alt	(Germany) Tanja Ostertag	7	3	1

Second round
1	(Russia) Anna Chakvetadze	6	6
(Russia) Regina Kulikova	3	4
(Ukraine) Mariya Koryttseva	6	6
(Russia) Vitalia Diatchenko	4	0

Qualifying competition
1	(Russia) Anna Chakvetadze	6^{3}	7	6
(Ukraine) Mariya Koryttseva	7	5	4

=== Second qualifier ===
First round
2	(Japan) Kimiko Date-Krumm	7	6^{1}	6
(Finland) Emma Laine	5	7	3
(Spain) Beatriz García Vidagany	2	6	6
WC	(Germany) Annika Beck	6	1	3
(Netherlands) Michaëlla Krajicek	7	7
PR	(Hungary) Katalin Marosi	6^{8}	5
(Germany) Laura Siegemund	6^{5}	2
7	(Austria) Yvonne Meusburger	7	6

Second round
2	(Japan) Kimiko Date-Krumm	2	6^{4}
(Spain) Beatriz García Vidagany	6	7
(Netherlands) Michaëlla Krajicek	7	6
7	(Austria) Yvonne Meusburger	6^{4}	2

Qualifying competition
(Spain) Beatriz García Vidagany	0	4
(Netherlands) Michaëlla Krajicek	6	6

=== Third qualifier ===
First round
3	(Austria) Tamira Paszek	6	6
(Kazakhstan) Sesil Karatantcheva	1	3
(Slovakia) Lenka Juríková	6	4	6
(Germany) Julia Schruff	4	6	3
WC	(Germany) Scarlett Werner	3	6	6
(Chinese Taipei) Chang Kai-chen	6	4	4
(Luxembourg) Mandy Minella	1	3
8	(Slovakia) Zuzana Kučová	6	6

Second round
3	(Austria) Tamira Paszek	7	6
(Slovakia) Lenka Juríková	5	4
WC	(Germany) Scarlett Werner	3	1
8	(Slovakia) Zuzana Kučová	6	6

Qualifying competition
3	(Austria) Tamira Paszek	7	6
8	(Slovakia) Zuzana Kučová	6^{3}	2

=== Fourth qualifier ===
First round
4	(Croatia) Mirjana Lučić	3	3
(Kazakhstan) Zarina Diyas	6	6
WC	(Germany) Carina Witthöft	5	2
(Croatia) Ana Vrljić	7	6
(United States) Madison Brengle	6	5	6^{3}
(Slovakia) Kristína Kučová	2	7	7
(Bulgaria) Dia Evtimova	2	5
6	(United States) Jamie Hampton	6	7

Second round
(Kazakhstan) Zarina Diyas	4	5
(Croatia) Ana Vrljić	6	7
(Slovakia) Kristína Kučová	4	2
6	(United States) Jamie Hampton	6	6

Qualifying competition
(Croatia) Ana Vrljić	6	1	3
6	(United States) Jamie Hampton	4	6	6
