= 2005 Challenge Bell =

- Date: October 31 – November 6
- Edition: 13th
- Category: WTA Tier III
- Draw: 32S (32Q) / 16D (4Q)
- Prize money: US$170,000
- Surface: Carpet – indoors
- Location: Quebec City, Canada
- Venue: PEPS de l'Université Laval

Champions

Singles
- (United States) Amy Frazier

Doubles
- (Russia) Anastasia Rodionova / (Russia) Elena Vesnina
← 2004 ·	Tournoi de Québec	· 2006 →

The 2005 Challenge Bell was a women's tennis tournament played on indoor carpet courts at the PEPS de l'Université Laval in Quebec City in Canada that was part of Tier III of the 2005 WTA Tour. It was the 13th edition of the Challenge Bell, and was held from October 31 through November 6, 2005. Sixth-seeded Amy Frazier won the singles title.

== Finals ==
=== Singles ===
(United States) Amy Frazier defeated (Sweden) Sofia Arvidsson, 6–1, 7–5

- It was Frazier's only title of the year and the 8th of her career.

=== Doubles ===
(Russia) 'Anastasia Rodionova / (Russia) Elena Vesnina defeated (Latvia) Līga Dekmeijere / (United States) Ashley Harkleroad, 6–7^{(4–7)}, 6–4, 6–2

- It was Rodionova's only title of the year and the 1st of her career. It was Vesnina's only title of the year and the 1st of her career.
