= 2006 Challenge Bell =

- Date: October 30 – November 5
- Edition: 14th
- Category: WTA Tier III
- Draw: 32S (32Q) / 16D (4Q)
- Prize money: US$175,000
- Surface: Carpet – indoors
- Location: Quebec City, Canada
- Venue: PEPS de l'Université Laval

Champions

Singles
- (France) Marion Bartoli

Doubles
- (United States) Carly Gullickson / (United States) Laura Granville
| ← 2005 · | Tournoi de Québec | · 2007 → |

The 2006 Challenge Bell was a women's tennis tournament played on indoor carpet courts at the PEPS de l'Université Laval in Quebec City in Canada that was part of Tier III of the 2006 WTA Tour. It was the 14th edition of the Challenge Bell, and was held from October 30 through November 5, 2006. Second-seeded Marion Bartoli won the singles title.

== Finals ==
=== Singles ===
(France) Marion Bartoli defeated (Russia) Olga Poutchkova, 6–0, 6–0

- It was Bartoli's 3rd title of the year and the 3rd of her career.

=== Doubles ===
(United States) Carly Gullickson / (United States) Laura Granville defeated (United States) Jill Craybas / (Russia) Alina Jidkova, 6–3, 6–4

- It was Gullickson's only title of the year and the 2nd of her career. It was Granville's only title of the year and the 2nd of her career.
