= 2007 Challenge Bell =

- Date: October 29 – November 4
- Edition: 15th
- Category: WTA Tier III
- Draw: 32S (32Q) / 16D (0Q)
- Prize money: US$175,000
- Surface: Carpet – indoors
- Location: Quebec City, Canada
- Venue: PEPS de l'Université Laval

Champions

Singles
- (United States) Lindsay Davenport

Doubles
- (United States) Christina Fusano / (United States) Raquel Kops-Jones
← 2006 ·	Tournoi de Québec	· 2008 →

The 2007 Challenge Bell was a women's tennis tournament played on indoor carpet courts. It was the 15th edition of the Challenge Bell, and was part of the Tier III tournaments of the 2007 WTA Tour. It was held at the PEPS de l'Université Laval in Quebec City, Canada, from October 29 through November 4, 2007. Unseeded Lindsay Davenport, who entered the main draw on a wildcard, won the singles title.

== Finals ==
=== Singles ===
(United States) Lindsay Davenport defeated (Ukraine) Julia Vakulenko, 6–4, 6–1

=== Doubles ===
(United States) Christina Fusano / (United States) Raquel Kops-Jones defeated (Canada) Stéphanie Dubois / (Czech Republic) Renata Voráčová, 6–2, 7–6^{(8–6)}

== Entrants ==
=== Seeds ===
Country	Player	Rank^{1}	Seed
CZE	Nicole Vaidišová	14	1
RUS	Vera Zvonareva	22	2
UKR	Julia Vakulenko	38	3
USA	Meilen Tu	47	4
BLR	Olga Govortsova	50	5
FRA	Alizé Cornet	68	6
GER	Angelique Kerber	77	7
RUS	Olga Poutchkova	80	8

- ^{1} Rankings are as of October 15, 2007

=== Other entrants ===
The following players received wildcards into the singles main draw:

- (United States) Lindsay Davenport
- (Canada) Stéphanie Dubois
- (Canada) Marie-Ève Pelletier

The following players received entry from the qualifying draw:

- (Sweden) Sofia Arvidsson
- (United States) Julie Ditty
- (New Zealand) Marina Erakovic
- (United States) Abigail Spears

The following players received entry as lucky losers:

- (Russia) Alina Jidkova
- (Slovenia) Andreja Klepač

=== Retirements ===
- (Russia) Alina Jidkova (dizziness)
- (Germany) Tatjana Malek (ear infection)
- (United States) Ahsha Rolle (right knee sprain)
- (Czech Republic) Nicole Vaidišová (right wrist injury)
