= Tanja Ostertag =

German former professional tennis player (born 1987)

- Country (sports): Germany
- Born: 26 September 1987 (age 37)
- Plays: Right-handed
- Prize money: $41,914

Singles
- Career record: 117–109
- Career titles: 2 ITF
- Highest ranking: No. 287 (20 November 2006)

Doubles
- Career record: 7–8
- Highest ranking: No. 876 (16 May 2005)

Tanja Ostertag (born 26 September 1987) is a German former professional tennis player.

A native of Stuttgart, Ostertag reached a career high ranking of 287 while competing on the professional tour.

Ostertag won two titles on the ITF Women's Circuit, both in Switzerland, and in 2006 had a win over world number 75 Kaia Kanepi at a tournament in Prostejov, which is the highest ranked opponent she defeated on tour.

In Quebec in 2006 she qualified for her only WTA Tour main draw, winning her first round match over Raluca Olaru at the Challenge Bell tournament, before being eliminated in the second round by Olga Puchkova.

== ITF finals ==
Legend
$25,000 tournaments
$10,000 tournaments

=== Singles: 4 (2–2) ===
Outcome	No.	Date	Tournament	Surface	Opponent	Score
Runner-up	1.	1 August 2004	ITF Bad Saulgau, Germany	Clay	(Germany) Gréta Arn	4–6, 2–6
Winner	1.	11 September 2005	ITF Vessy, Switzerland	Clay	(France) Stéphanie Rizzi	6–4, 7–6^{(17)}
Runner-up	2.	28 October 2007	ITF Augusta, United States	Hard	(Russia) Alisa Kleybanova	2–6, 1–6
Winner	2.	20 June 2010	ITF Lenzerheide, Switzerland	Clay	(Russia) Daria Salnikova	3–6, 7–6^{(7)}, 7–6^{(4)}
