= Ekaterina Shulaeva =

Canadian tennis player

- Country (sports): Canada
- Residence: Oakville, Canada
- Born: 30 May 1987 (age 38); Kishinev, Moldavian SSR, Soviet Union (Chișinău, Moldova)
- Turned pro: 2001
- Retired: 2017
- Plays: Right-handed (two-handed backhand)
- Prize money: US$42,905

Singles
- Career record: 89–81
- Career titles: 0
- Highest ranking: No. 253 (25 February 2008)

Doubles
- Career record: 25–32
- Career titles: 1 ITF
- Highest ranking: No. 339 (17 December 2007)

Ekaterina Shulaeva (born 30 May 1987 in Chișinău) is a retired Moldovan-born Canadian tennis player.

Shulaeva has a career-high singles ranking by the Women's Tennis Association (WTA) of 253, achieved on 25 February 2008. Shulaeva also has a career-high WTA doubles ranking of 339, achieved on 17 December 2007. In 2010, she won the $10k ITF São Paulo doubles title with partner Roxane Vaisemberg.

Shulaeva made her WTA Tour main-draw debut at the 2007 Challenge Bell, in the doubles event, partnering Aleksandra Wozniak.

== ITF finals ==
Legend
$25,000 tournaments
$10,000 tournaments

=== Singles (0–1) ===
Outcome	Date	Tournament	Surface	Opponent	Score
Runner-up	10 February 2008	Cali, Colombia	Clay	(France) Mathilde Johansson	6–3, 0–6, 1–6

=== Doubles (1–0) ===
Outcome	Date	Tournament	Surface	Partner	Opponents	Score
Winner	6 June 2010	São Paulo, Brazil	Clay	(Brazil) Roxane Vaisemberg	(Brazil) Fernanda Faria (Brazil) Paula Cristina Gonçalves	6–3, 6–3

== Junior Fed Cup participation ==
=== Singles (6–0) ===
W/L	Year	No.	Date	Location	Against	Surface	Opponent	Score
W	2002	1.	13 September 2002	La Baule-Escoublac, France	Brazil	Clay	Patricia Coimbra	6–4, 7–6^{(7–5)}
W	2002	2.	14 September 2002	La Baule-Escoublac, France	United States	Clay	Riza Zalameda	6–3, 6–3
W	2003	3.	16 September 2003	Essen, Germany	Russia	Clay	Ekaterina Kirianova	6–2, 3–6, 6–3
W	2003	4.	17 September 2003	Essen, Germany	Thailand	Clay	Nudnida Luangnam	6–4, 6–0
W	2003	5.	19 September 2003	Essen, Germany	Israel	Clay	Efrat Zlotikamin	6–1, 6–3
W	2003	6.	21 September 2003	Essen, Germany	Netherlands	Clay	Bibiane Schoofs	6–1, 6–3

=== Doubles (3–2) ===
W/L	Year	No.	Date	Location	Against	Surface	Partner	Opponents	Score
L	2002	1.	10 September 2002	La Baule-Escoublac, France	France	Clay	Aleksandra Wozniak	Alexandra Sellem; Charlene Vanneste	3–6, 2–6
W	2002	2.	13 September 2002	La Baule-Escoublac, France	Brazil	Clay	Aleksandra Wozniak	Patricia Coimbra; Bruna Paes	6–2, 6–4
W	2002	3.	14 September 2002	La Baule-Escoublac, France	United States	Clay	Aleksandra Wozniak	Whitney Deason; Riza Zalameda	6–3, 6–1
L	2003	4.	16 September 2003	Essen, Germany	Russia	Clay	Katarina Zoricic	Ekaterina Kosminskaya; Ekaterina Makarova	3–6, 3–6
W	2003	5.	18 September 2003	Essen, Germany	Brazil	Clay	Katarina Zoricic	Bruna Cunha; Bruna Paes	6–0, 6–3
