= Sunitha Rao =

Indian-American tennis player

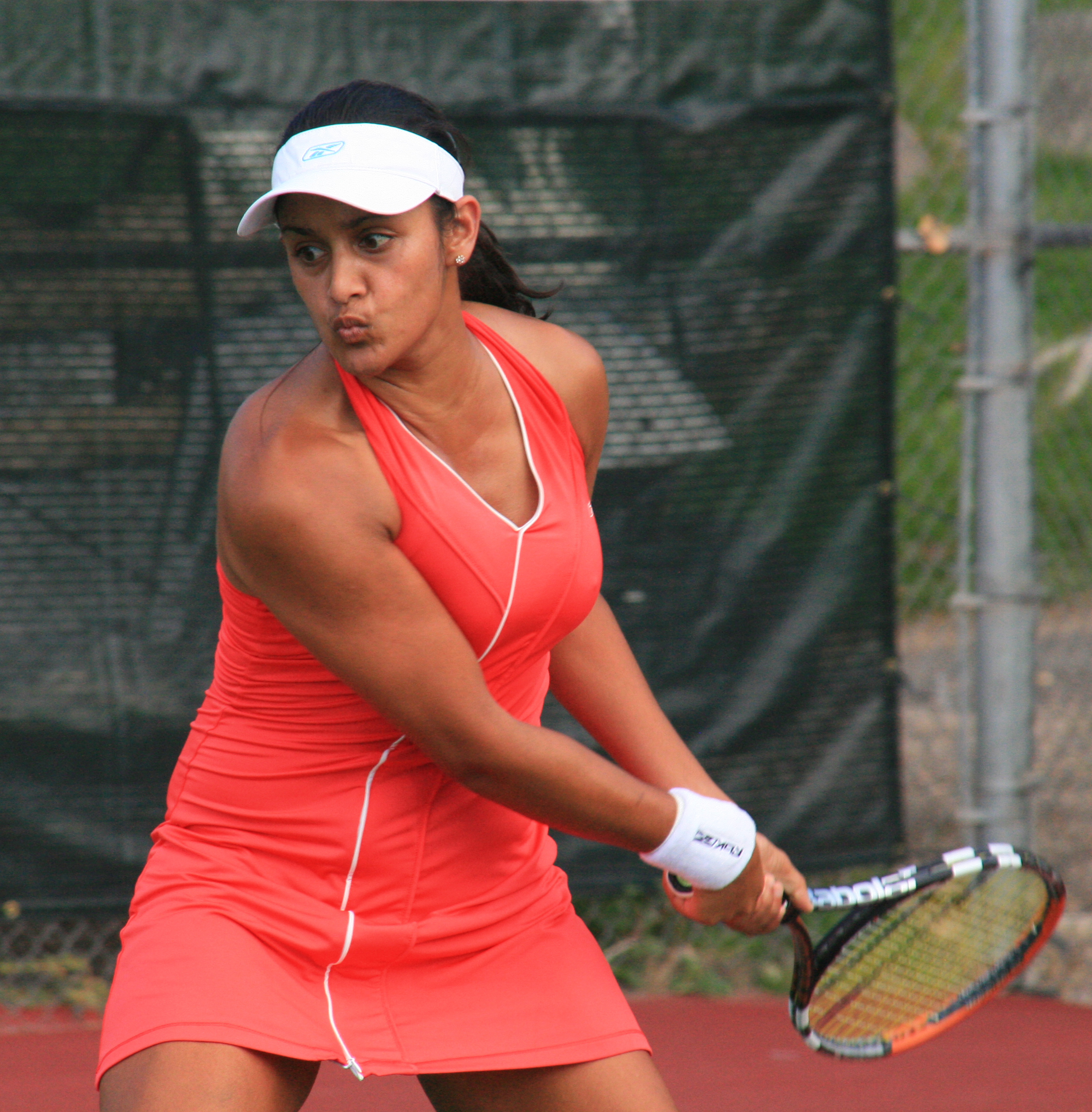
- Rao at the 2008 Coleman Vision Tennis Championships in Albuquerque, New Mexico
- Country (sports): United States (2000–09); India (2007–09; Fed Cup and Olympic tournaments only)
- Residence: Bradenton, Florida
- Born: October 27, 1985 (age 39) Jersey City, New Jersey
- Height: 5 ft 7 in (170 cm)
- Turned pro: 2004
- Retired: 2009
- Plays: Right-handed (two-handed backhand)
- Prize money: US$ 238,224

Singles
- Career record: 196–188
- Career titles: 0
- Highest ranking: No. 144 (July 7, 2008)

Grand Slam singles results
- Australian Open: Q3 (2003, 2005)
- French Open: Q2 (2005, 2006)
- Wimbledon: Q3 (2003)
- US Open: Q3 (2007)

Doubles
- Career record: 107–105
- Career titles: 8 ITF
- Highest ranking: No. 108 (May 19, 2008)

Other doubles tournaments
- Olympic Games: 2R (2008)

Sunitha Rao (born October 27, 1985) is an Indian-American former professional tennis player, who represented India in international tournaments. She won eight doubles titles on the ITF Circuit in her career. On July 7, 2008, she reached her best singles ranking of world No. 144. On May 19, 2008, she peaked at No. 108 in the doubles rankings.

Playing for India Fed Cup team, she has a win–loss record of 5–6. Rao also is the fourth female tennis player in history representing India to enter the top-200 world rankings, after Nirupama Sanjeev, Shikha Uberoi, and Sania Mirza.

== Personal life ==
Rao was born in Jersey City, New Jersey in 1985 and was raised by her Telugu Indian immigrant parents Manohar and Savithri, who were from Chennai.

== Career ==
=== 2002–2007 ===
Rao played her first WTA Tour match at the 2002 Brasil Open, where she defeated Vanessa Henke in the first round. She was beaten by Anastasia Myskina in the second round.

Rao played at the 2004 Korea Open where she was beaten by Miho Saeki in the first round. Rao participated at the 2005 Internationaux de Strasbourg, but was overpowered by Iveta Benešová in the first round. Then she played at the Sunfeast Open where she beat Neha Uberoi in the first round before falling to Elena Likhovtseva.

She took part at the 2006 Commonwealth Bank Tennis Classic, where she lost to Angelique Widjaja in the first round. She also suffered a first-round defeat at the 2006 Sunfeast Open to Nicole Pratt. Rao defeated Sandy Gumulya in the first round of the 2007 Sunfeast Open to advance to the second round where she lost to Anne Keothavong. She then lost in the first round of the 2007 Challenge Bell to Alina Jidkova.

=== 2008 ===
Rao received an entry into the PTT Pattaya Open via a lucky loser spot. She beat Junri Namigata before losing to Ekaterina Bychkova. Then, at the Copa Colsanitas, she lost to Edina Gallovits in the first round.

Rao received the best result of her WTA career at the 2008 DFS Classic in Birmingham. She beat Petra Kvitová (who would be the future world No. 2 and Wimbledon titlist) in the first round and Naomi Cavaday in the second before falling to Alona Bondarenko in the third round.

She partnered with Sania Mirza, representing India in the women's doubles event at the 2008 Summer Olympics in Beijing. They got a walkover in round one, but lost to Svetlana Kuznetsova and Dinara Safina of Russia in round two.

Rao announced retirement from tennis in 2009. She graduated from the Babson College in 2014 and works in the real estate business.

== ITF finals ==
Legend
$75,000 tournaments
$50,000 tournaments
$25,000 tournaments
$10,000 tournaments

=== Singles (0–7) ===
| Result | No. | Date | Location | Surface | Opponent | Score |
|---|---|---|---|---|---|---|
| Loss | 1. | February 24, 2002 | Mumbai, India | Hard | (China) Peng Shuai | 3–6, 6–7^{(3–7)} |
| Loss | 2. | November 10, 2002 | Mexico City | Hard | (Czech Republic) Olga Vymetálková | 6–7^{(2–7)}, 3–6 |
| Loss | 3. | October 17, 2004 | Mackay, Australia | Hard | (Australia) Evie Dominikovic | 5–7, 3–6 |
| Loss | 4. | October 24, 2004 | Rockhampton, Australia | Hard | (Australia) Evie Dominikovic | 0–6, 0–2 ret. |
| Loss | 5. | July 8, 2007 | Southlake, United States | Hard | (United States) Alexa Glatch | 2–6, 5–7 |
| Loss | 6. | October 14, 2007 | San Francisco, United States | Hard | (United States) Ashley Harkleroad | 1–6, 2–6 |
| Loss | 7. | March 22, 2008 | Noida, India | Hard | (Latvia) Anastasija Sevastova | 2–6, 1–6 |

=== Doubles (8–7) ===
| Result | No. | Date | Location | Surface | Partner | Opponents | Score |
|---|---|---|---|---|---|---|---|
| Loss | 1. | January 18, 2004 | Tampa, United States | Hard | (United States) Milangela Morales | (Russia) Alisa Kleybanova (Japan) Mayumi Yamamoto | 2–6, 4–6 |
| Loss | 2. | May 16, 2004 | Charlottesville, United States | Clay | (Puerto Rico) Vilmarie Castellvi | (Argentina) Erica Krauth (United States) Jessica Lehnhoff | 0–6, 1–6 |
| Win | 1. | November 14, 2004 | Port Pirie, Australia | Hard | (Australia) Casey Dellacqua | (Australia) Daniella Dominikovic (Australia) Evie Dominikovic | 4–6, 6–3, 7–6^{(6)} |
| Win | 2. | November 13, 2005 | Port Pirie, Australia | Hard | (Germany) Gréta Arn | (Australia) Monique Adamczak (Australia) Christina Horiatopoulos | 6–4, 3–6, 6–2 |
| Win | 3. | November 27, 2005 | Mount Gambier, Australia | Hard | (Japan) Ryōko Fuda | (Germany) Gréta Arn (Russia) Anastasia Rodionova | 6–1, ret. |
| Win | 4. | May 7, 2006 | Charlottesville, United States | Clay | (Canada) Marie-Ève Pelletier | (Brazil) Maria Fernanda Alves (United States) Lilia Osterloh | 6–7^{(6)}, 6–2, 6–3 |
| Loss | 3. | July 23, 2006 | Hammond, United States | Hard | (Japan) Ryōko Fuda | (United States) Christina Fusano (United States) Raquel Kops-Jones | 6–7^{(3)}, 6–4, 1–6 |
| Loss | 4. | October 8, 2006 | Traralgon, Australia | Hard | (Australia) Casey Dellacqua | (Australia) Christina Horiatopoulos (United States) Raquel Kops-Jones | 2–6, 6–7^{(5)} |
| Win | 5. | October 15, 2006 | Melbourne, Australia | Hard | (Australia) Casey Dellacqua | (Australia) Daniella Dominikovic (Australia) Evie Dominikovic | 6–3, 6–2 |
| Loss | 5. | January 20, 2007 | Fort Walton Beach, United States | Hard | (Canada) Marie-Ève Pelletier | (Germany) Angelika Bachmann (United States) Tetiana Luzhanska | 7–5, 6–7^{(7)}, 6–7^{(4)} |
| Win | 6. | June 2, 2007 | Carson, United States | Hard | (South Africa) Kim Grant | (United States) Angela Haynes (United States) Lindsay Lee-Waters | 6–4, 6–4 |
| Win | 7. | June 17, 2007 | Allentown, United States | Hard | (Japan) Ryōko Fuda | (United States) Angela Haynes (United States) Lindsay Lee-Waters | 6–7^{(3)}, 6–4, 6–1 |
| Loss | 6. | March 14, 2008 | New Delhi, India | Hard | (France) Aurélie Védy | (China) Ji Chunmei (China) Sun Shengnan | 6–2, 2–6, [4–10] |
| Win | 8. | May 11, 2008 | Zagreb Ladies Open, Croatia | Clay | (Hungary) Melinda Czink | (France) Stéphanie Foretz (Croatia) Jelena Kostanić Tošić | 6–4, 6–2 |
| Loss | 7. | October 5, 2008 | Troy, United States | Hard | (United States) Angela Haynes | (United States) Raquel Kops-Jones (United States) Abigail Spears | 2–6, 0–6 |
