= Jamea Jackson =

American tennis player

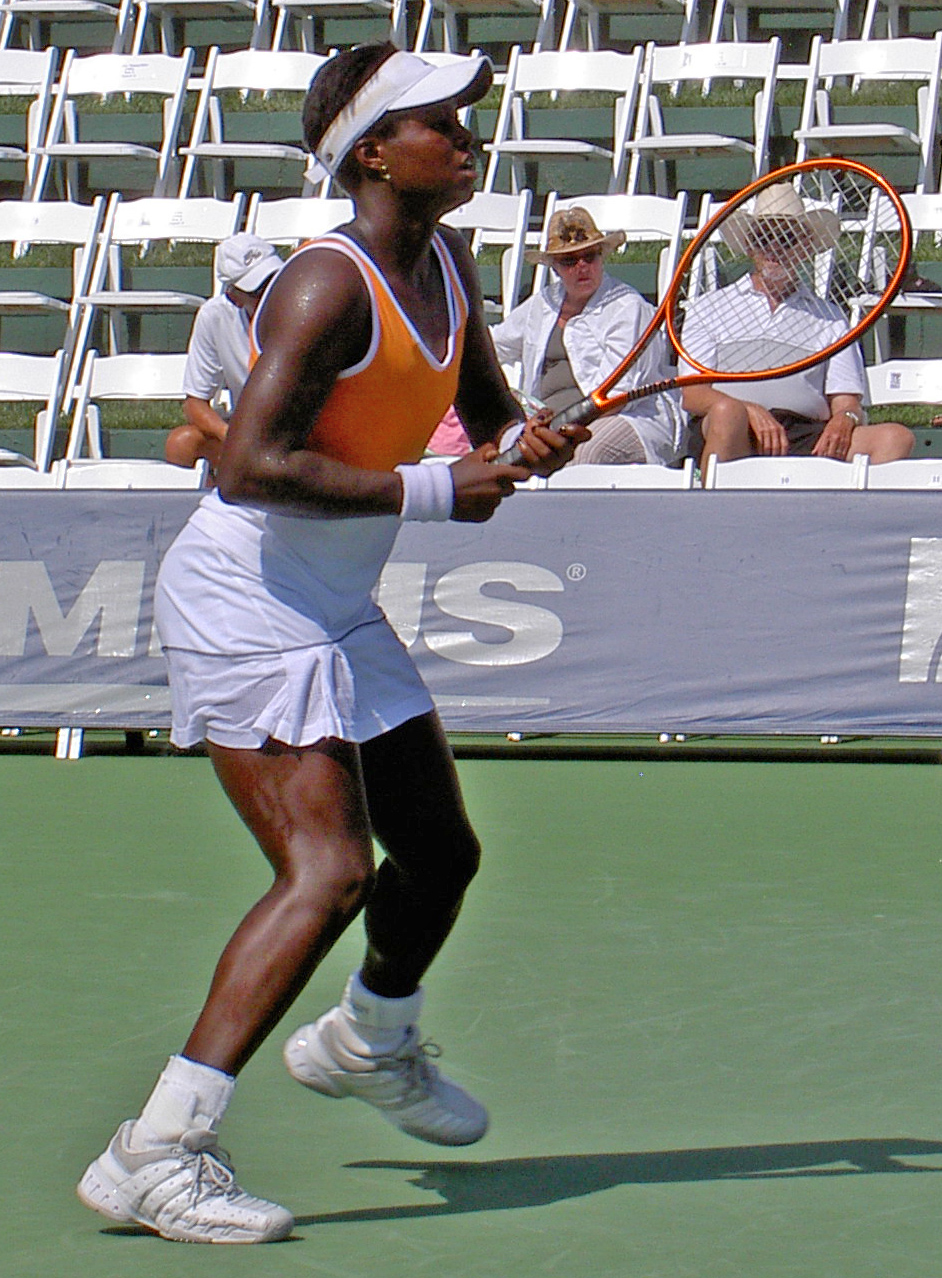
- Country (sports): United States
- Residence: Bradenton, Florida
- Born: September 7, 1986 (age 40) Atlanta, Georgia, U.S.
- Height: 5 ft 4 in (1.63 m)
- Turned pro: 2003
- Retired: August 24, 2009
- Plays: Right-handed (two-handed backhand)
- Prize money: $455,220

Singles
- Career record: 120–87
- Career titles: 2 ITF
- Highest ranking: No. 45 (November 13, 2006)

Grand Slam singles results
- Australian Open: 2R (2006)
- French Open: 2R (2006)
- Wimbledon: 2R (2005, 2006)
- US Open: 2R (2006)

Doubles
- Career record: 7–23
- Career titles: 0
- Highest ranking: No. 266 (October 30, 2006)

Grand Slam doubles results
- French Open: 1R (2006)
- Wimbledon: 1R (2006)
- US Open: 1R (2004, 2005, 2006)

Mixed doubles
- Career record: 1–1

Grand Slam mixed doubles results
- US Open: 2R (2006)
- Last updated on: February 26, 2010.

Jamea Jackson (/dʒəˈmiːə/ jə-MEE-ə; born September 7, 1986) is an American former Women's Tennis Association (WTA) player and current United States Tennis Association (USTA) coach. She reached a singles ranking of 45 in the world at the end of 2006.

Jackson was born in Atlanta, Georgia and attended the Nick Bollettieri Tennis Academy in Bradenton, Florida. She was announced as the Assistant Coach of the Oklahoma State University Women's Tennis Team in August 2009. In 2010 and 2011, Jackson coached the USTA collegiate team. In July 2013, Jackson joined the USTA staff in Boca Raton, Florida as a National Coach for Women's Tennis.

== Tennis career ==
She won two ITF Women's Circuit singles titles. The first was a $10,000 hard-court event in 2003 in Dallas, Texas. The second was a $50,000 hard-court event in 2004 in Tucson, Arizona.

She began her tennis career on the ITF Junior Circuit where, in 2003, was ranked in the top 20 in the world in both singles and doubles. She turned professional that same year and competed the next few years on the ITF Women's Circuit. In 2004, began playing more WTA events and began a full schedule in 2005, when she cracked the top 100 in the world. In 2006, Jamea had her best year of her career, compiling a 26–22 singles record. Jackson is the first tennis player ever to use the instant replay system in a tour level match, challenging a call in her first round win at the 2006 Nasdaq 100 Open in Miami, against compatriot Ashley Harkleroad. The call ended up being wrong, and Harkleroad challenged later in the match, becoming the first person to correctly challenge. Jackson ended up winning in a battle 7–5, 6–7, 7–5. She led the United States Fed Cup team to a victory over Germany that same year. She won both her matches to notch the win for the U.S. She defeated Anna-Lena Grönefeld and Martina Müller to guide the USA into the next round. Jackson reached her first WTA Tour final on June 17, 2006 when she beat both Jelena Janković and Maria Sharapova in Birmingham on grass. However, she was defeated by Vera Zvonareva in the final match of the DFS Classic in straight sets. At the tailend of 2006 and her short 2007 seasons, Jamea suffered a recurring hip injury requiring surgery. In April 2008, after eight months away from the tour, she came back at a $75,000 ITF event in Dothan, Alabama. She won 6 consecutive matches, 3 in qualifying and then 3 in the main draw before giving a walkover to Bethanie Mattek-Sands. She did not play her next event until the U.S. Open Series, where she scored an upset win over Marion Bartoli. She played her final match at the 2008 US Open, losing to seed Alyona Bondarenko losing 2–6, 6–3, 6–2. She officially retired from pro tennis on August 24, 2009 due to her recurring hip injury, as well as her coaching position at Oklahoma State University.

== WTA career finals ==
=== Singles (1 runner-up) ===
Legend
Grand Slam
WTA Championships
Tier I
Tier II
Tier III
Tier IV & V (0–1)

Outcome	No.	Date	Tournament	Surface	Opponent	Score
Runner-up	1.	June 18, 2006	Birmingham Classic, United Kingdom	Grass	(Russia) Vera Zvonareva	6–7^{(12–14)}, 6–7^{(5–7)}

== ITF finals ==
=== Singles (2 titles, 1 runner-up) ===
Legend
$100,000 tournaments
$75,000 tournaments
$50,000 tournaments
$25,000 tournaments
$10,000 tournaments

Outcome	No.	Date	Tournament	Surface	Opponent	Score
Winner	1.	22 June 2003	ITF Dallas, United States	Hard	(United States) Angela Haynes	7–6^{(7–5)}, 6–3
Runner-up	1.	May 16, 2004	ITF Charlottesville, United States	Clay	(United States) Marissa Irvin	3–6, 6–7^{(5–7)}
Winner	2.	21 November 2004	ITF Tucson, United States	Hard	(Canada) Stéphanie Dubois	7–6^{(7–5)}, 7–5

== Grand Slam singles performance timeline ==
Key
W	F	SF	QF	#R	RR	Q#	DNQ	A	NH

(W) winner; (F) finalist; (SF) semifinalist; (QF) quarterfinalist; (#R) rounds 4, 3, 2, 1; (RR) round-robin stage; (Q#) qualification round; (DNQ) did not qualify; (A) absent; (NH) not held; (SR) strike rate (events won / competed); (W–L) win–loss record.

Tournament	2004	2005	2006	2007	2008	Career W–L
Australian Open	A	Q2	2R	A	A	1–1
French Open	A	Q1	2R	1R	A	1–2
Wimbledon	A	2R	2R	1R	A	2–3
US Open	1R	1R	2R	1R	1R	1–5
Win–loss	0–1	1–2	4–4	0–3	0–1	5–11

== Personal ==
Jamea started playing tennis at age 8. Her father, Ernest, played in the NFL as cornerback for the New Orleans Saints, the Atlanta Falcons, and the Detroit Lions. Her mother, Ruby, wrote Flying High: Diary of a Flight Attendant , based on her flight attendant career that lasted over 30 years. She has an older brother, Jarryd Jackson. Jamea was hired as assistant coach at Oklahoma State University with her real emphasis on mentoring the players, as well as recruiting. In 2014, Jamea graduated from Oklahoma State with a B.A. in University Studies and a minor in Psychology.
