= PEPS =

Sports and recreation facility at Laval University in Québec City, Canada

The Laval University Sports and Physical Education Complex, Pavillon de l'éducation physique et des sports de l'Université Laval PEPS is a sports complex located in Quebec City, Quebec, on the Université Laval campus. PEPS opened in 1970 and includes an outdoor stadium (Telus Stadium), an indoor stadium, two indoor swimming pools (aquatic centre), basketball and tennis courts, a fitness centre, and two hockey arenas.

For the 1976 Summer Olympics, it hosted four women's and seven men's team handball competitions.

The main arena seats 2,000 and was home to the reborn Quebec Remparts of the Quebec Major Junior Hockey League from 1997 to 1999 when they moved back to their traditional home at the Colisée Pepsi.

From 2004 to 2018, PEPS was home to the WTA Tour Coupe Banque Nationale. From 2009 to 2012, it was home to the Quebec Kebs basketball franchise in the National Basketball League of Canada.

A major expansion from 2010 to 2012 added an indoor Olympic size swimming pool, a 3,000-seat gymnasium, a covered soccer stadium, and other facilities. Upgrades were also made to the outdoor stadium.
