= Valérie Tétreault =

Canadian tennis player

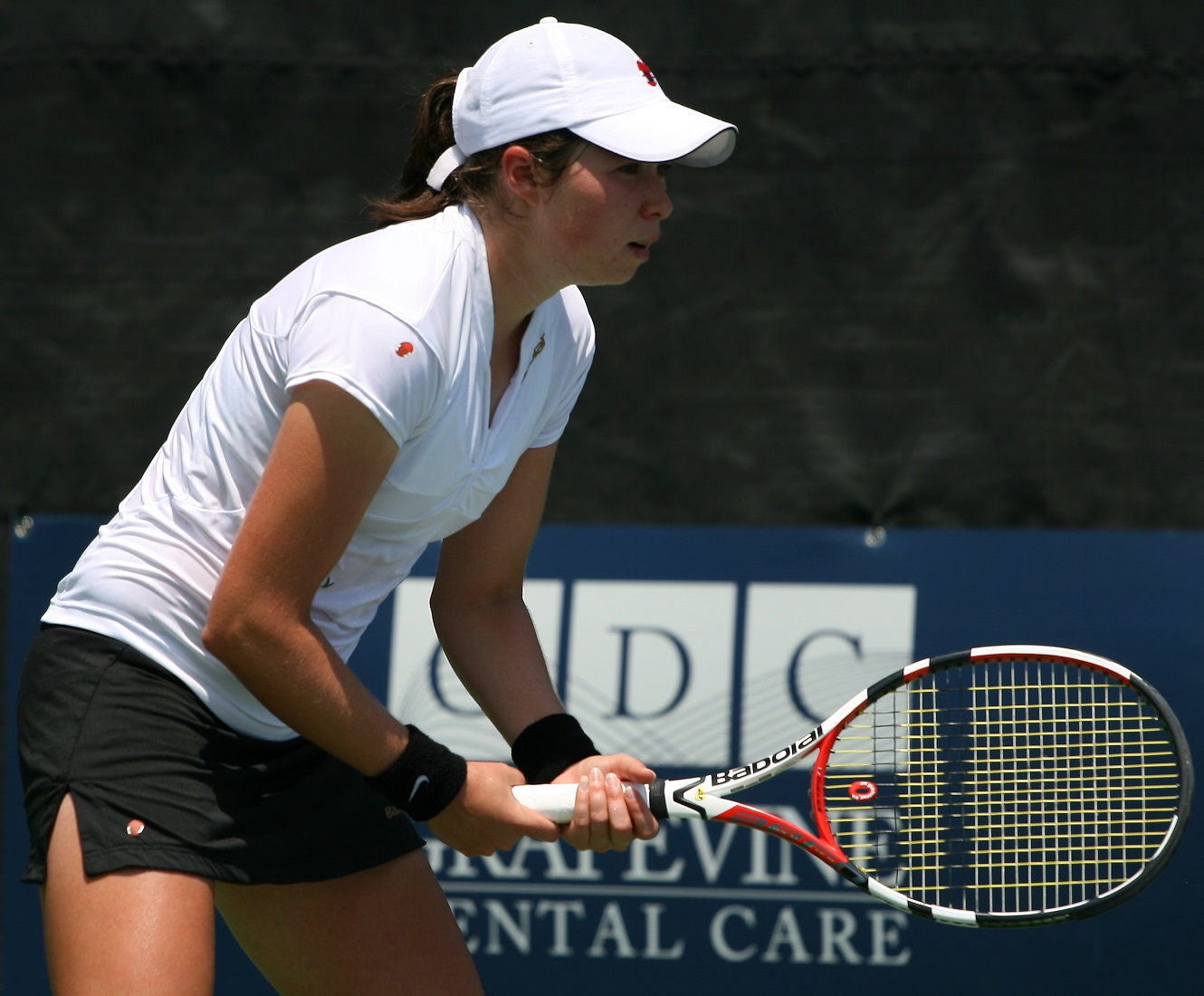
- Country (sports): Canada
- Residence: Saint-Jean-sur-Richelieu, Québec
- Born: January 21, 1988 (age 38) Saint-Jean-sur-Richelieu
- Height: 1.70 m (5 ft 7 in)
- Turned pro: 2006
- Retired: December 9, 2010
- Plays: Right-handed (two-handed backhand)
- Prize money: $158,841

Singles
- Career record: 130–98
- Career titles: 3 ITF
- Highest ranking: No. 112 (February 22, 2010)

Grand Slam singles results
- Australian Open: 1R (2010)
- French Open: Q1 (2010)
- US Open: 1R (2009)

Doubles
- Career record: 36–58
- Career titles: 0
- Highest ranking: No. 307 (April 5, 2010)

Valérie Tétreault (born January 21, 1988) is a Canadian former professional tennis player. She reached a career-high singles ranking of world No. 112 in February 2010, and peaked at No. 307 in the doubles rankings in April of the same year.

== Tennis career ==
=== 2006–2010 ===
In 2006, at the Rogers Cup, she played doubles with Sharon Fichman, but they lost in the first round against the eventual winning team of Martina Navratilova and Nadia Petrova, in two sets. In 2007, she played again the Rogers Cup, this time with Aleksandra Wozniak. They lost their first-round match against Francesca Schiavone and Roberta Vinci, in two sets. In 2008, she played with Mélanie Gloria in the doubles draw at the Rogers Cup. They lost their match in the first round in three sets against Melinda Czink and Olga Savchuk. At the 2008 Challenge Bell, she lost in the second round of the singles competition against Bethanie Mattek-Sands in three sets. In 2009, she was handed a wildcard for the Rogers Cup, but lost her first-round match against Ágnes Szávay, in two sets. At the 2009 US Open, she lost her first-round match against Magdaléna Rybáriková, in three sets. In 2010, her final year on the tour, she won three qualifying matches at the Australian Open, but was handily eliminated by Kim Clijsters, former No. 1 and reigning US Open champion, in straight sets. She announced her retirement from professional tennis with immediate effect on December 9, 2010.

She had a brief comeback in October 2011 at the Challenger of Saguenay, but lost in the final round of qualifying.

=== Life after tennis ===
Tétreault today works for Tennis Canada as the regional manager for the communications and media relations. She is also a tennis analyst for TVA Sports.

== ITF Circuit finals ==
=== Singles: 8 (3 titles, 5 runner-ups) ===
Legend
$50,000 tournaments (2–1)
$25,000 tournaments (1–3)
$10,000 tournaments (0–1)

Result	W–L	Date	Tournament	Tier	Surface	Opponent	Score
Loss	0–1	Feb 2006	Challenger de Saguenay, Canada	25,000	Hard (i)	(Germany) Angelique Kerber	7–5, 5–7, 6–7^{(6)}
Loss	0–2	Apr 2006	ITF Bath, United Kingdom	10,000	Hard (i)	(Poland) Urszula Radwańska	6–7^{(6)}, 2–6
Loss	0–3	Jul 2006	ITF Hamilton, Canada	25,000	Clay	(Canada) Aleksandra Wozniak	1–6, 7–6^{(5)}, 2–6
Loss	0–4	Aug 2006	Vancouver Open, Canada	25,000	Hard	(United States) Ansley Cargill	5–7, 4–6
Win	1–4	May 2009	Carson Challenger, United States	50,000	Hard	(United States) Alexandra Stevenson	4–6, 6–2, 6–4
Win	2–4	Jun 2009	ITF El Paso, United States	25,000	Hard	(United States) Mashona Washington	6–4, 6–3
Win	3–4	Jul 2009	ITF Grapevine, United States	50,000	Hard	(Canada) Stéphanie Dubois	2–6, 7–6^{(6)}, 7–6^{(1)}
Loss	3–5	Oct 2009	ITF Kansas, United States	50,000	Hard	(Russia) Regina Kulikova	4–6, 1–6

=== Doubles: 3 (3 runner-ups) ===
Legend
$50,000 tournaments (0–1)
$25,000 tournaments (0–1)
$10,000 tournaments (0–1)

Result	W–L	Date	Tournament	Tier	Surface	Partner	Opponents	Score
Loss	0–1	May 2006	ITF Monterrey, Mexico	10,000	Hard	(Mexico) Lorena Villalobos Cruz	(Argentina) Betina Jozami (Argentina) Agustina Lepore	6–4, 1–6, 2–6
Loss	0–2	Jul 2007	ITF Southlake, United States	25,000	Hard	(Canada) Stéphanie Dubois	(South Africa) Surina De Beer (South Africa) Kim Grant	6–4, 4–6, 4–6
Loss	0–3	Jul 2009	ITF Grapevine, United States	50,000	Hard	(United States) Kimberly Couts	(United States) Lindsay Lee-Waters (United States) Riza Zalameda	6–7^{(5)}, 3–6

== Grand Slam singles performance timeline ==
Key
W	F	SF	QF	#R	RR	Q#	DNQ	A	NH

(W) winner; (F) finalist; (SF) semifinalist; (QF) quarterfinalist; (#R) rounds 4, 3, 2, 1; (RR) round-robin stage; (Q#) qualification round; (DNQ) did not qualify; (A) absent; (NH) not held; (SR) strike rate (events won / competed); (W–L) win–loss record.

Tournament	2009	2010	W–L
Australian Open	A	1R	0–1
French Open	A	Q1	0–0
Wimbledon	A	A	0–0
US Open	1R	Q3	0–1
Win–loss	0–1	0–1	0–2

== Head-to-head records ==
=== Record against top-100 players ===
Tétreault's win–loss record (6–15, 29%) against players who were ranked world No. 100 or higher when played is as follows:
Players who have been ranked world No. 1 are in boldface.

- (Czech Republic) Barbora Strýcová 2–0
- (United States) Edina Gallovits-Hall 2–2
- (France) Mathilde Johansson 1–0 (Note: has a 2–2 overall record vs. Johansson)
- (United Kingdom) Katie O'Brien 1–0
- (Belgium) **Kim Clijsters** 0–1
- (Czech Republic) Lucie Šafářová 0–1
- (France) Marion Bartoli 0–1
- (Italy) Roberta Vinci 0–1
- (Hungary) Ágnes Szávay 0–1
- (United States) Bethanie Mattek-Sands 0–1
- (Slovakia) Magdaléna Rybáriková 0–1
- (Russia) Olga Puchkova 0–1
- (United States) Lindsay Lee-Waters 0–1 (Note: has a 1–3 overall record vs. Lee-Waters)
- (Czech Republic) Lucie Hradecká 0–1
- (United Kingdom) Elena Baltacha 0–1
- (Uzbekistan) Akgul Amanmuradova 0–1 (Note: has a 0–2 overall record vs. Amanmuradova)
- (Germany) Julia Schruff 0–1
