= Stéphanie Dubois =

Canadian tennis player

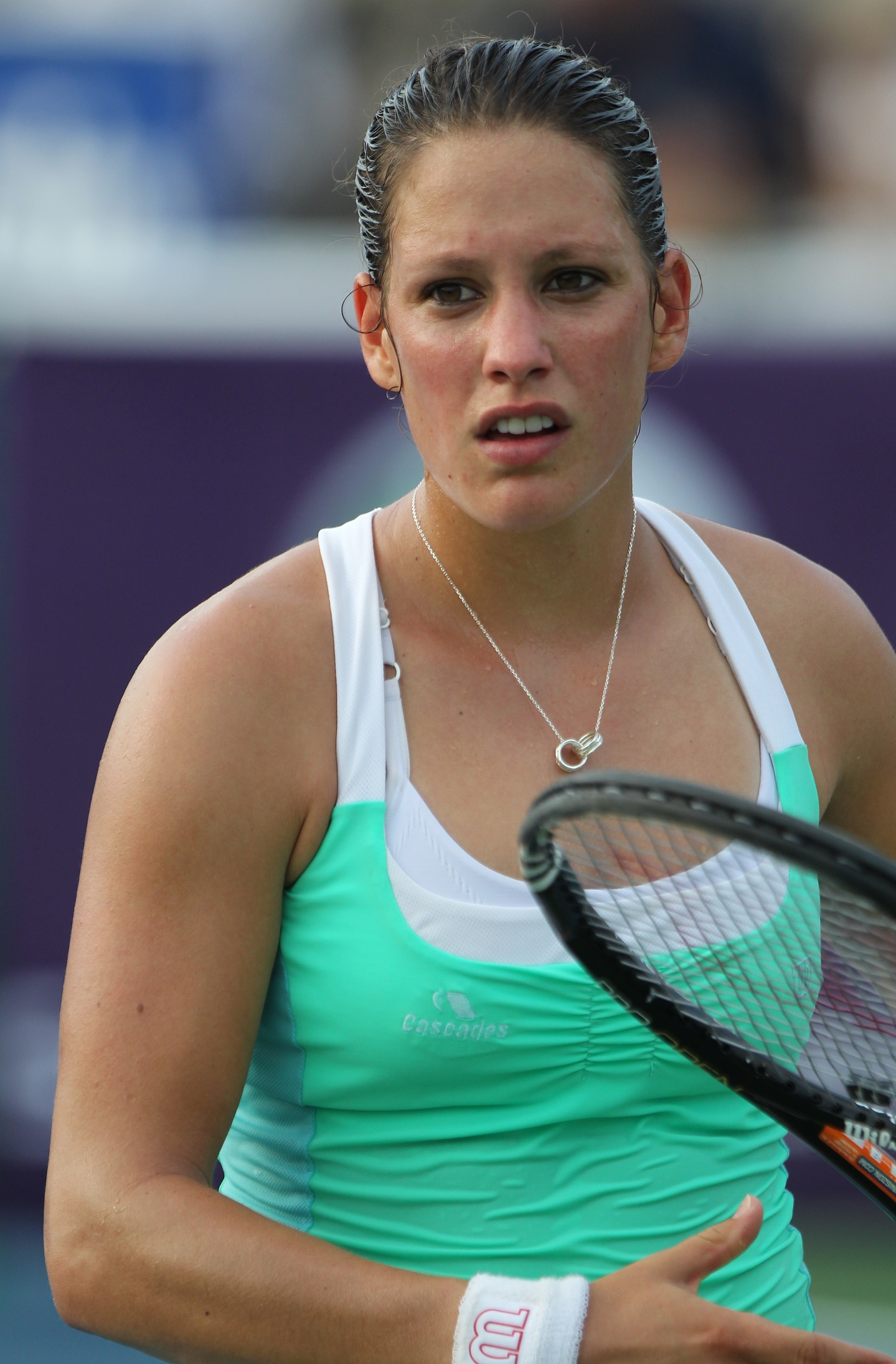
- Stéphanie Dubois at the 2011 Citi Open
- Country (sports): Canada
- Residence: London, England
- Born: October 31, 1986 (age 39) Laval, Québec
- Height: 1.62 m (5 ft 4 in)
- Turned pro: 2004
- Retired: September 8, 2014
- Plays: Right-handed (two-handed backhand)
- Prize money: $902,867

Singles
- Career record: 347–264
- Career titles: 10 ITF
- Highest ranking: No. 87 (January 30, 2012)

Grand Slam singles results
- Australian Open: 2R (2012)
- French Open: 1R (2008, 2010, 2012)
- Wimbledon: 2R (2011)
- US Open: 2R (2009)

Doubles
- Career record: 113–112
- Career titles: 8 ITF
- Highest ranking: No. 102 (September 22, 2008)

Grand Slam doubles results
- Wimbledon: Q1 (2009)

Other doubles tournaments
- Olympic Games: 1R (2012)

Team competitions
- Fed Cup: 23–10

Stéphanie Dubois (born October 31, 1986) is a former tennis player from Canada. She turned professional in 2004 and achieved a career-best ranking of world No. 87 in January 2012.

Dubois was awarded Female Player of the Year by Tennis Canada two times (2005, 2007). She retired after the tournoi de Québec in September 2014.

== Tennis career ==
=== 2004–07 ===
Dubois made her first appearance in July 2004 in the Fed Cup World Group play-offs against Switzerland. She reached her first WTA quarterfinal at the 2005 Challenge Bell in Quebec City. At the 2006 Rogers Cup, she scored the biggest win of her career when she defeated Kim Clijsters (who retired from the match), to reach the third round. In 2007, Dubois and Renata Voráčová reached the Challenge Bell final but lost to Christina Fusano and Raquel Kops-Jones in straight sets.

=== 2008–10 ===
In 2008, she got in the main draw of the Australian Open and the French Open, participating in a first in the latter, where two Quebec native players were in the main draw by their own ranking for the first time. Also in 2008, Dubois had three match points against eighth seed Anna Chakvetadze in the first round of Wimbledon but lost with a score of 6–8 in the final set. She also reached the third round of the 2008 Rogers Cup for the second time of her career with a victory over world No. 20, Maria Kirilenko. In 2009, Dubois won the $75k Vancouver Open by beating the top seed Sania Mirza in three sets. Also in 2009, she defeated Kristina Mladenovic in the first round of the US Open, her first major main-draw win, before losing to Sorana Cîrstea in the second round.

=== 2011–14 ===
Dubois reached the second round at Wimbledon in 2011 where she lost to world No. 11, Andrea Petkovic, in three sets. She reached at the end of July the second WTA Tour quarterfinal of her career at the Washington Open in College Park, but lost to Tamira Paszek in a match that lasted almost four hours. In January 2012, Dubois won her first-round match at the Australian Open for the first time, with a win over Elena Vesnina. She lost in the second round to 30th seed Angelique Kerber. At the 2012 Summer Olympics, she teamed with Aleksandra Wozniak to represent Canada in the women's doubles; they lost in the opening round.

In September 2014, Dubois retired from tennis after losing in the first round of the Tournoi de Québec.

== Life after tennis ==
In the spring of 2015, Dubois studied in communication at Promédia. She married Briton Oliver Sheath in July 2015 and gave birth to their daughter Alicia in April 2017 and Annabelle later. Dubois lives in Kent and works as a tennis analyst for the WTA. She also has a level-3 coach certification from the LTA.

== WTA Tour finals ==
=== Doubles: 1 (runner-up) ===
Legend Tier II Tier III, IV & V (0–1)	Finals by surface Hard (0–0) Carpet (0–1)

Result	Date	Tournament	Tier	Surface	Partner	Opponents	Score
Loss	Oct 2007	Tournoi de Québec, Canada	Tier III	Carpet (i)	(Czech Republic) Renata Voráčová	(United States) Christina Fusano (United States) Raquel Kops-Jones	2–6, 6–7^{(6–8)}

== ITF Circuit finals ==
=== Singles: 23 (10–13) ===
Legend
$100,000 tournaments
$75,000 tournaments (1–1)
$50,000 tournaments (3–8)
$25,000 tournaments (6–3)
$10,000 tournaments (0–1)

Result	W–L	Date	Tournament	Tier	Surface	Opponent	Score
Win	1–0	Jun 2004	ITF Hamilton, Canada	25,000	Clay	(United States) Alexa Glatch	6–1, 7–5
Loss	1–1	Jun 2004	ITF Mont-Tremblant, Canada	10,000	Clay	(Argentina) Soledad Esperón	3–6, 4–6
Loss	1–2	Sep 2004	Albuquerque Championships, US	75,000	Hard	(United States) Marissa Irvin	1–6, 6–4, 4–6
Loss	1–3	Nov 2004	ITF Tucson, United States	50,000	Hard	(United States) Jamea Jackson	6–7^{(5)}, 5–7
Win	2–3	Feb 2005	ITF Rockford, United States	25,000	Hard (i)	(Czech Republic) Hana Šromová	6–1, 6–2
Loss	2–4	Jul 2005	Lexington Open, United States	50,000	Hard	(South Africa) Natalie Grandin	4–6, 3–6
Win	3–4	Feb 2006	ITF Rockford, United States	25,000	Hard (i)	(Romania) Anda Perianu	7–6^{(4)}, 6–3
Loss	3–5	Apr 2006	ITF Jackson, United States	25,000	Clay	(Russia) Vasilisa Bardina	6–4, 2–6, 0–6
Win	4–5	Nov 2006	ITF Lawrenceville, United States	50,000	Hard	(United States) Julie Ditty	6–3, 7–6^{(6)}
Win	5–5	Jul 2007	ITF Hamilton, Canada	25,000	Clay	(Canada) Sharon Fichman	6–2, 6–2
Win	6–5	Jul 2007	Lexington Open, United States	50,000	Hard	(United Kingdom) Anne Keothavong	4–6, 6–3, 6–3
Loss	6–6	Aug 2007	Vancouver Open, Canada	50,000	Hard	(United Kingdom) Anne Keothavong	5–7, 1–6
Loss	6–7	Oct 2007	Classic of Troy, United States	50,000	Hard	(Estonia) Maret Ani	6–3, 4–6, 2–6
Loss	6–8	Nov 2007	ITF La Quinta, United States	50,000	Hard	(United States) Ashley Harkleroad	3–6, 6–7^{(6)}
Loss	6–9	Oct 2008	Toronto Challenger, Canada	50,000	Hard (i)	(United States) Alexa Glatch	4–6, 3–6
Loss	6–10	Jul 2009	ITF Grapevine, United States	50,000	Hard	(Canada) Valérie Tétreault	6–2, 6–7^{(6)}, 6–7^{(1)}
Win	7–10	Aug 2009	Vancouver Open, Canada	75,000	Hard	(India) Sania Mirza	1–6, 6–4, 6–4
Loss	7–11	Jul 2010	Lexington Open, United States	50,000	Hard	(Japan) Kurumi Nara	4–6, 4–6
Win	8–11	May 2011	Charlottesville Open, United States	50,000	Clay	(Portugal) Michelle Larcher de Brito	1–6, 7–6^{(5)}, 6–1
Win	9–11	Jul 2011	Challenger de Granby, Canada	25,000	Hard	(Hong Kong) Zhang Ling	6–2, 2–6, 6–1
Loss	9–12	Jul 2012	Challenger de Granby, Canada	25,000	Hard	(Canada) Eugenie Bouchard	2–6, 2–5 ret.
Win	10–12	Oct 2012	Classic of Troy, United States	25,000	Hard	(Canada) Sharon Fichman	3–6, 6–4, 6–3
Loss	10–13	Oct 2012	ITF Florence, United States	25,000	Hard	(Colombia) Mariana Duque Mariño	6–4, 2–6, 1–6

=== Doubles: 17 (8–9) ===
Legend
$75,000 tournaments (2–4)
$50,000 tournaments (3–3)
$25,000 tournaments (3–2)

Result	W–L	Date	Tournament	Tier	Surface	Partner	Opponents	Score
Win	1–0	Apr 2004	ITF Jackson, United States	25,000	Clay	(Russia) Alisa Kleybanova	(United States) Cory Ann Avants (United States) Kristen Schlukebir	6–2, 6–3
Loss	1–1	Sep 2004	Albuquerque Championships, United States	75,000	Hard	(Argentina) María Emilia Salerni	(Canada) Maureen Drake (United States) Carly Gullickson	3–6, 6–7^{(6)}
Win	2–1	Mar 2005	ITF Redding, United States	25,000	Hard	(Ukraine) Yulia Beygelzimer	(New Zealand) Leanne Baker (Italy) Francesca Lubiani	6–4, 6–7^{(1)}, 6–3
Loss	2–2	May 2005	ITF Raleigh, United States	75,000	Clay	(Brazil) Maria Fernanda Alves	(United States) Ashley Harkleroad (United States) Lindsay Lee-Waters	2–6, 6–0, 3–6
Loss	2–3	Mar 2006	ITF Orange, United States	50,000	Hard	(United States) Lilia Osterloh	(Ukraine) Kateryna Bondarenko (Ukraine) Alona Bondarenko	2–6, 4–6
Win	3–3	Nov 2006	ITF Pittsburgh, United States	75,000	Hard (i)	(Russia) Alisa Kleybanova	(United States) Ashley Harkleroad (Russia) Galina Voskoboeva	6–4, 5–7, 6–1
Loss	3–4	Feb 2007	Midland Tennis Classic, US	75,000	Hard (i)	(Canada) Maureen Drake	(United States) Laura Granville (United States) Abigail Spears	4–6, 6–3, 3–6
Loss	3–5	Jul 2007	ITF Southlake, United States	25,000	Hard	(Canada) Valérie Tétreault	(South Africa) Surina De Beer (South Africa) Kim Grant	6–4, 4–6, 4–6
Win	4–5	Jul 2007	ITF Hamilton, Canada	25,000	Clay	(South Africa) Surina De Beer	(Sweden) Michaela Johansson (Colombia) Paula Zabala	w/o
Win	5–5	Aug 2007	Vancouver Open, Canada	50,000	Hard	(Canada) Marie-Ève Pelletier	(Argentina) Soledad Esperón (Argentina) Agustina Lepore	6–4, 6–4
Win	6–5	Oct 2007	ITF Lawrenceville, US	50,000	Hard	(Russia) Alisa Kleybanova	(New Zealand) Leanne Baker (United States) Julie Ditty	6–2, 6–0
Win	7–5	Nov 2007	ITF Pittsburgh, United States	75,000	Hard (i)	(Russia) Alisa Kleybanova	(United States) Raquel Kops-Jones (United States) Abigail Spears	6–4, 4–6, [10–6]
Loss	7–6	Apr 2008	Dothan Pro Classic, US	75,000	Clay	(Brazil) Maria Fernanda Alves	(Ukraine) Tetiana Luzhanska (Czech Republic) Michaela Paštiková	1–6, 3–6
Win	8–6	Oct 2008	Toronto Challenger, Canada	50,000	Hard (i)	(Canada) Marie-Ève Pelletier	(Czech Republic) Nikola Fraňková (Germany) Carmen Klaschka	6–4, 6–2
Loss	8–7	Sep 2009	Challenger de Saguenay, Canada	50,000	Hard (i)	(Canada) Rebecca Marino	(Sweden) Sofia Arvidsson (France) Séverine Brémond Beltrame	3–6, 1–6
Loss	8–8	Apr 2013	ITF Poza Rica, Mexico	25,000	Hard	(Ukraine) Olga Savchuk	(Bolivia) María Fernanda Álvarez Terán (Brazil) Maria Fernanda Alves	2–6, 3–6
Loss	8–9	May 2013	Open Saint-Gaudens, France	50,000	Clay	(Japan) Kurumi Nara	(Israel) Julia Glushko (Argentina) Paula Ormaechea	5–7, 6–7^{(11)}

== Grand Slam singles performance timeline ==
Key
W	F	SF	QF	#R	RR	Q#	DNQ	A	NH

(W) winner; (F) finalist; (SF) semifinalist; (QF) quarterfinalist; (#R) rounds 4, 3, 2, 1; (RR) round-robin stage; (Q#) qualification round; (DNQ) did not qualify; (A) absent; (NH) not held; (SR) strike rate (events won / competed); (W–L) win–loss record.

Tournament	2005	2006	2007	2008	2009	2010	2011	2012	2013	2014	SR	W–L
Australian Open	Q1	A	Q1	1R	1R	1R	Q3	2R	Q3	Q3	0 / 4	1–4
French Open	Q1	Q1	Q2	1R	Q2	1R	Q3	1R	Q2	A	0 / 3	0–3
Wimbledon	Q1	Q1	Q1	1R	1R	1R	2R	1R	Q1	A	0 / 5	1–5
US Open	Q2	1R	Q3	Q2	2R	Q3	Q3	Q2	Q2	A	0 / 2	1–2
Win–loss	0–0	0–1	0–0	0–3	1–3	0–3	1–1	1–3	0–0	0–0	0 / 14	3–14

== Record against top-50 players ==
Dubois' win–loss record (8–32, 20%) against players who were ranked world No. 50 or higher when played is as follows:
Players who have been ranked world No. 1 are in boldface.

- (Belarus) Olga Govortsova 3–0 (Note: Has a 4–1 overall record vs. Govortsova)
- **(Belgium) Kim Clijsters** 1–0
- (Spain) Carla Suárez Navarro 1–0
- (Czech Republic) Květa Peschke 1–0
- (Russia) Maria Kirilenko 1–1
- (Japan) Ai Sugiyama 1–2
- **(Belarus) Victoria Azarenka** 0–1 (Note: Has a 0–2 overall record vs. Azarenka)
- **(Serbia) Jelena Janković** 0–1
- **(United States) Venus Williams** 0–1
- (Russia) Nadia Petrova 0–1
- (Russia) Anna Chakvetadze 0–1
- (Germany) Angelique Kerber 0–1 (Note: Has a 0–2 overall record vs. Kerber)
- (Germany) Andrea Petkovic 0–1 (Note: Has a 1–1 overall record vs. Petkovic)
- (France) Nathalie Dechy 0–1
- (Israel) Shahar Pe'er 0–1 (Note: Has a 0–3 overall record vs. Pe'er)
- (Italy) Roberta Vinci 0–1 (Note: Has a 0–2 overall record vs. Vinci)
- (Hungary) Ágnes Szávay 0–1 (Note: Has a 0–2 overall record vs. Szávay)
- (China) Zheng Jie 0–1
- (Thailand) Tamarine Tanasugarn 0–1 (Note: Has a 0–2 overall record vs. Tanasugarn)
- (France) Virginie Razzano 0–1
- (Czech Republic) Lucie Šafářová 0–1 (Note: Has a 1–1 overall record vs. Šafářová)
- (Austria) Sybille Bammer 0–1
- (Czech Republic) Klára Zakopalová 0–1 (Note: Has a 0–2 overall record vs. Zakopalová)
- (Romania) Sorana Cîrstea 0–1
- (Austria) Tamira Paszek 0–1 (Note: Has a 0–2 overall record vs. Paszek)
- (United States) Bethanie Mattek-Sands 0–1
- (Bulgaria) Tsvetana Pironkova 0–1 (Note: Has a 0–5 overall record vs. Pironkova)
- (Ukraine) Julia Vakulenko 0–1 (Note: Has a 1–1 overall record vs. Vakulenko)
- (South Africa) Chanelle Scheepers 0–1 (Note: Has a 1–1 overall record vs. Scheepers)
- (Canada) Rebecca Marino 0–1 (Note: Has a 1–3 overall record vs. Marino)
- (France) Pauline Parmentier 0–1 (Note: Has a 0–2 overall record vs. Parmentier)
- (Italy) Sara Errani 0–2
- (Slovenia) Katarina Srebotnik 0–2

== Awards ==
- 2005 – Tennis Canada female player of the year
- 2007 – Tennis Canada female player of the year
