= Laura Granville =

American tennis player (born 1981)

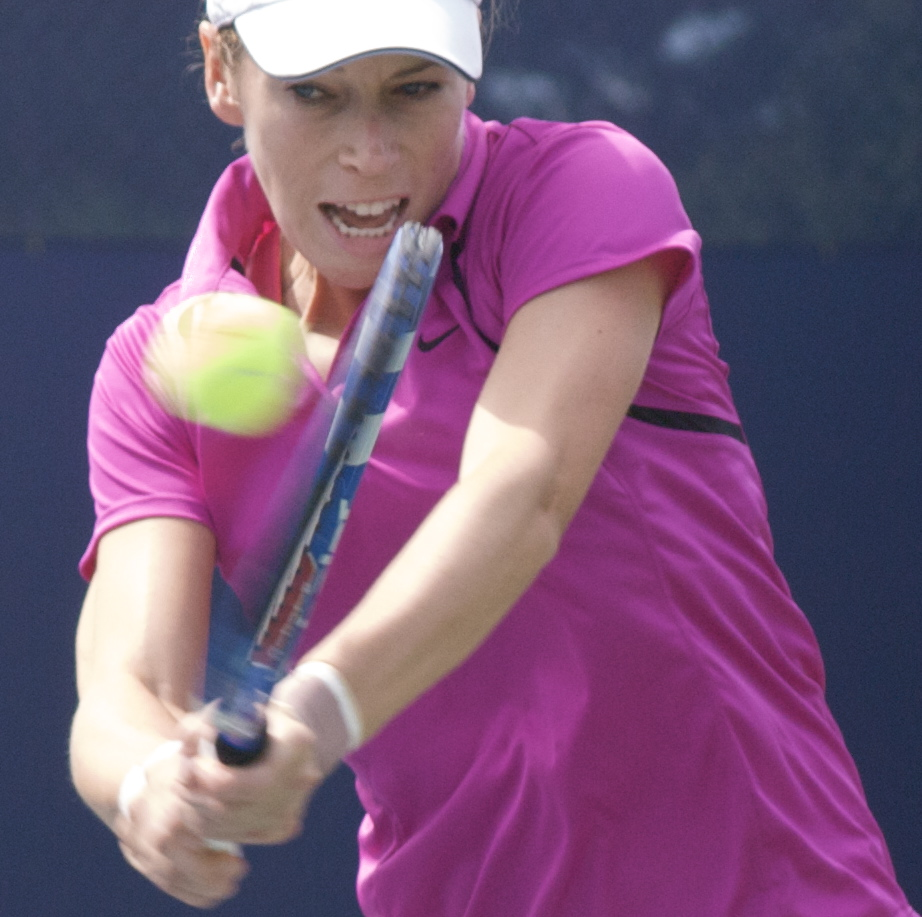
- Granville at the 2009 US Open
- Country (sports): United States
- Residence: Chicago, Illinois, U.S.
- Born: May 12, 1981 (age 45) Chicago, Illinois, U.S.
- Height: 1.75 m (5 ft 9 in)
- Turned pro: 2001
- Retired: 2010
- Plays: Right-handed (two-handed backhand)
- Prize money: US$ 1,327,584

Singles
- Career record: 249–177
- Career titles: 9 ITF
- Highest ranking: No. 28 (June 9, 2003)

Grand Slam singles results
- Australian Open: 3R (2004, 2006)
- French Open: 3R (2003)
- Wimbledon: 4R (2002, 2007)
- US Open: 3R (2005)

Doubles
- Career record: 121–98
- Career titles: 2 WTA, 6 ITF
- Highest ranking: No. 47 (July 23, 2007)

Laura Granville (born May 12, 1981) is an American former professional tennis player. During the two years she spent at Stanford University, she set the record for most consecutive singles victories with 58 and finished with an overall record of 93–3. Granville won the NCAA Championship in singles as well as the ITA Player of the Year in both 2000 and 2001.

In 2001, Stanford won the women's tennis national team championship, and Granville was also a doubles finalist. She retired in 2010 after seven full years on the WTA Tour and returned to Stanford, where she completed her studies and graduated in 2012. She was inducted into the Stanford University Athletics Hall of Fame in 2014.

Granville is now in her sixth season as the head coach of the Princeton University women's tennis team. In 2014, the Princeton women's tennis program won the Ivy League title and defeated Arizona State 4–3 to win its first-ever NCAA tournament match.

== Career highlights ==
1996—Won the Illinois girl's high school tennis state singles championships as a sophomore at The Latin School of Chicago.

1998—Claimed the USTA National Girls' 18 Singles and earned a wildcard into the US Open main draw, losing in the second round (defeating world No. 96, Paola Suárez, en route.)

1999—Repeated as the USTA National Girls' 18 Singles and earned a wildcard into the US Open main draw.

2000—Won the National Collegiate Athletic Association (NCAA) women's singles championship as a freshman at Stanford University.

2001—Won the Honda Sports Award as the nation's best female tennis player.

2001—Won her second consecutive NCAA singles championship as a sophomore at Stanford University.

2001—Turned professional after her sophomore year and reached three ITF Circuit semifinals.

2002—Won two ITF tournaments, was the runner-up in two ITF tournaments, reached her first-ever WTA Tour quarterfinals in New Haven, U.S. and Luxembourg (beating Arantxa Sánchez Vicario in the first round), won three singles matches at Wimbledon (including a defeat of Mary Pierce), reached the third round at the tournament in Montreal, and made her top 100 and top 50 debuts.

2007—Defeated former world No. 1, Martina Hingis, in the third round at Wimbledon to match her career best showing there. Defeated 2013 Wimbledon champion Marion Bartoli indoors at Memphis.

2008—Won the ITF tournament in Midland, Michigan.

== WTA career finals ==
=== Singles: 1 (runner-up) ===
Result	No.	Date	Tournament	Tier	Surface	Opponent	Score
Loss	1.	Aug 2004	Vancouver Open	Tier V	Hard	(Czech Republic) Nicole Vaidišová	6–2, 4–6, 2–6

=== Doubles: 5 (2 titles, 3 runner-ups) ===
Result	No.	Date	Tournament	Tier	Surface	Partner	Opponents	Score
Loss	1.	May 2003	Internationaux de Strasbourg	Tier III	Clay	(Croatia) Jelena Kostanić	(Canada) Sonya Jeyaseelan (Croatia) Maja Matevžič	4–6, 4–6
Loss	2.	Feb 2005	Memphis Cup	Tier III	Hard (i)	(United States) Abigail Spears	(Japan) Yuka Yoshida (Japan) Miho Saeki	3–6, 4–6
Win	1.	Jul 2005	Cincinnati Open	Tier II	Hard	(United States) Abigail Spears	(Czech Republic) Květa Peschke (Argentina) María Emilia Salerni	3–6, 6–2, 6–4
Win	2.	Nov 2006	Tournoi de Québec	Tier III	Carpet (i)	(United States) Carly Gullickson	(United States) Jill Craybas (Russia) Alina Jidkova	6–3, 6–4
Loss	3.	Jan 2010	Auckland Open	International	Hard	(South Africa) Natalie Grandin	(Zimbabwe) Cara Black (United States) Liezel Huber	6–7^{(4–7)}, 2–6

== ITF Circuit finals ==
$100,000 tournaments
$75,000 tournaments
$50,000 tournaments
$25,000 tournaments
$10,000 tournaments

=== Singles: 15 (9–6) ===
Result	No.	Date	Tournament	Surface	Opponent	Score
Win	1.	19 March 2002	ITF La Cañada, United States	Hard	(Luxembourg) Claudine Schaul	1–6, 6–2, 6–3
Loss	2.	2 June 2002	Surbiton Trophy, United Kingdom	Grass	(Chinese Taipei) Janet Lee	6–4, 4–6, 4–6
Loss	3.	4 August 2002	Vancouver Open, Canada	Hard	(Russia) Maria Sharapova	6–0, 3–6, 1–6
Win	4.	29 September 2002	Albuquerque Championships, U.S.	Hard	(Canada) Marie-Ève Pelletier	6–7^{(2)}, 6–4, 6–1
Loss	5.	9 February 2003	Midland Tennis Classic, United States	Hard (i)	(Germany) Bianka Lamade	3–6, 6–1, 4–6
Win	6.	17 October 2004	ITF Ashburn, United States	Hard	(Czech Republic) Lucie Šafářová	6–4, 6–2
Win	7.	13 February 2005	Midland Tennis Classic, United States	Hard	(South Korea) Cho Yoon-jeong	6–3, 3–6, 7–6^{(6)}
Win	8.	22 February 2005	ITF Saint Paul, United States	Hard (i)	(Japan) Akiko Morigami	6–2, 6–7^{(6)}, 6–2
Loss	9.	4 June 2005	Surbiton Trophy, United Kingdom	Grass	(Puerto Rico) Kristina Brandi	3–6, 1–6
Win	10.	7 May 2006	Charlottesville Classic, U.S.	Clay	(Slovakia) Dominika Cibulková	w/o
Loss	11.	10 June 2006	Surbiton Trophy, United Kingdom	Grass	(Puerto Rico) Kristina Brandi	5–7, 0–6
Loss	12.	11 February 2007	Midland Tennis Classic, United States	Hard	(United States) Jill Craybas	6–2, 3–6, 3–6
Win	13.	10 February 2008	Midland Tennis Classic, United States	Hard (i)	(United States) Ashley Harkleroad	6–1, 6–1
Win	14.	22 March 2009	ITF Redding, United States	Hard	(Japan) Rika Fujiwara	6–2, 2–6, 6–4
Win	15.	24 May 2009	Landisville Challenge, United States	Hard	(Slovenia) Petra Rampre	6–2, 6–1

=== Doubles: 9 (6–3) ===
Result	No.	Date	Tournament	Surface	Partner	Opponents	Score
Win	1.	3 October 2004	Classic of Troy, United States	Hard	(United States) Teryn Ashley	(United States) Bethanie Mattek-Sands (United States) Shenay Perry	2–6, 3–0 ret.
Win	2.	14 November 2004	Pittsburgh Challenger, U.S.	Hard	(United States) Teryn Ashley	(Belgium) Els Callens (Australia) Samantha Stosur	2–6, 6–3, 6–4
Win	3.	10 October 2006	San Francisco Challenger, U.S.	Hard	(United States) Carly Gullickson	(United States) Christina Fusano (United States) Aleke Tsoubanos	6–3, 6–1
Loss	4.	22 October 2006	Houston Challenger, U.S.	Hard	(United States) Carly Gullickson	(United States) Julie Ditty (United States) Tetiana Luzhanska	4–6, 6–4, 5–7
Win	5.	11 February 2007	Midland Tennis Classic, U.S.	Hard	(United States) Abigail Spears	(Canada) Maureen Drake (Canada) Stéphanie Dubois	6–4, 3–6, 6–3
Loss	6.	6 April 2009	ITF Jackson County, U.S.	Clay	(United States) Riza Zalameda	(Australia) Monique Adamczak (Australia) Arina Rodionova	3–6, 4–6
Win	7.	31 May 2009	Carson Challenger, U.S.	Hard	(United States) Riza Zalameda	(Australia) Monique Adamczak (Australia) Nicole Kriz	6–3, 6–4
Loss	8.	12 October 2009	ITF Kansas City, U.S.	Hard	(United States) Julia Boserup	(United States) Lilia Osterloh (United States) Anna Tatishvili	0–6, 3–6
Win	9.	14 February 2010	Midland Tennis Classic, U.S.	Hard	(Czech Republic) Lucie Hradecká	(United States) Anna Tatishvili (United States) Lilia Osterloh	7–6^{(3)}, 3–6, [12–10]
