= Séverine Beltrame =

French tennis player (born 1979)

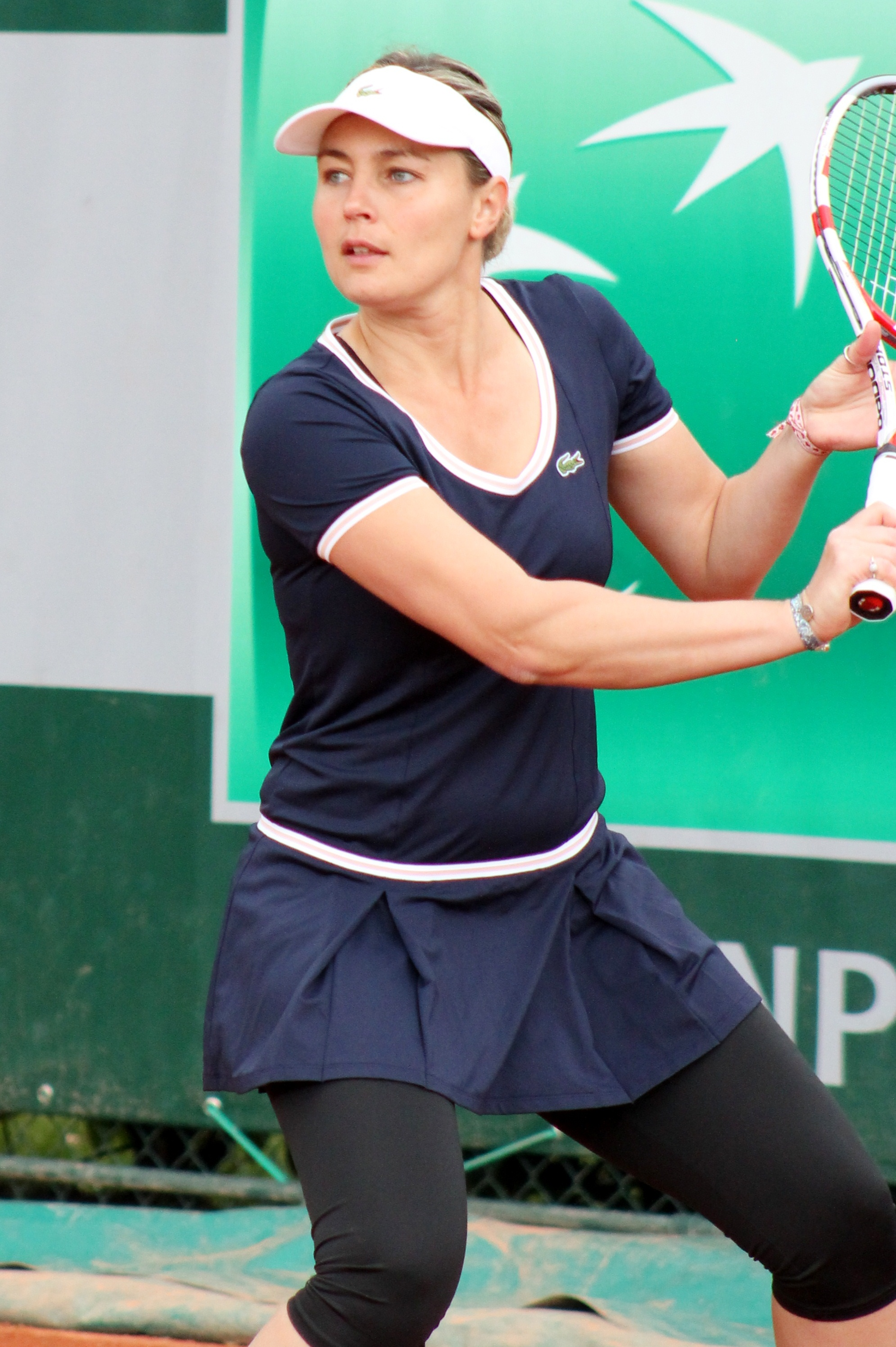
- Beltrame in 2013
- Country (sports): France
- Residence: Aix-en-Provence, France
- Born: 14 August 1979 (age 46) Montpellier, France
- Height: 1.72 m (5 ft 8 in)
- Turned pro: 2002
- Retired: 2013
- Plays: Right (one-handed backhand)
- Prize money: $1,221,128

Singles
- Career record: 302–282
- Career titles: 8 ITF
- Highest ranking: No. 34 (5 February 2007)

Grand Slam singles results
- Australian Open: 2R (2009)
- French Open: 2R (2005)
- Wimbledon: QF (2006)
- US Open: 4R (2008)

Doubles
- Career record: 91–106
- Career titles: 10 ITF
- Highest ranking: No. 85 (25 June 2007)

Séverine Beltrame (born 14 August 1979) is a former tennis player from France. She was known as Séverine Brémond during her marriage to her coach, Eric Brémond, from September 2005 to November 2008, and then as Séverine Brémond-Beltrame until the end of 2009, before she reverted to her birthname Beltrame in 2010.

== Matches ==
In 2005, Beltrame was selected by the team leader Georges Goven to play with Mary Pierce, Amélie Mauresmo and Nathalie Dechy for the semifinals of the Fed Cup against Spain when teammate Virginie Razzano was injured and players Marion Bartoli and Émilie Loit were suspended.

On 10 July 2006, Beltrame (as Séverine Brémond) achieved a career-high singles ranking of world No. 65 after her success at the 2006 Wimbledon Championships, where she reached the quarterfinal of a Grand Slam event for the first time. After qualifying for the tournament, she defeated No. 10 Patty Schnyder in the second round, Gisela Dulko in the third round, and Ai Sugiyama in the fourth, losing to eventual runner-up Justine Henin-Hardenne 4–6, 4–6.

Her last event for 2006 was the Bell Challenge in Québec, Canada. Following her run to the semifinals at this event, she broke the top 40 for the first time and landed at No. 38. In February 2007, she achieved her career-high ranking of 34.

Beltrame entered the 2008 US Open as a wildcard, where she beat Julia Görges, Nicole Vaidišová and Tathiana Garbin. She lost to eventual champion Serena Williams (2–6, 2–6) in the fourth round.

She made the semifinals of the mixed-doubles tournament at Wimbledon of 2007 with Fabrice Santoro.

In May 2013, Beltrame announced that she would be retiring from tennis right after the conclusion of the French Open.

== WTA Tour finals ==
=== Doubles: 2 (2 runner-ups) ===
Legend Premier M & Premier 5 Premier (0–1) International (0–1)	Finals by surface Hard (0–1) Grass (0–1)

Result	Date	Tournament	Surface	Partner	Opponent	Score
Loss	Jun 2008	Birmingham Classic, England	Grass	(Spain) Virginia Ruano Pascual	(Zimbabwe) Cara Black (United States) Liezel Huber	2–6, 1–6
Loss	Sep 2010	Tournoi de Québec, Canada	Hard (i)	(Sweden) Sofia Arvidsson	(United States) Vania King (Czech Republic) Barbora Strýcová	1–6, 3–6

== ITF Circuit finals ==
$100,000 tournaments
$75,000 tournaments
$50,000 tournaments
$25,000 tournaments
$10,000 tournaments

=== Singles: 15 (8–7) ===
Result	No.	Date	Tournament	Surface	Opponent	Score
Loss	1.	25 September 2000	ITF Lerida, Spain	Clay	(Sweden) Maria Wolfbrandt	3–6, 4–6
Win	1.	24 June 2001	ITF Canet-en-Roussillon, France	Clay	(France) Séverine Arpajou	3–6, 6–3, 6–4
Win	2.	2 July 2001	ITF Périgueux, France	Clay	(Uruguay) Daniela Olivera	6–4, 6–1
Loss	2.	27 October 2002	ITF Saint-Raphaël, France	Hard (i)	(France) Camille Pin	4–6, 5–7
Win	3.	21 September 2003	ITF Sofia, Bulgaria	Clay	(Austria) Patricia Wartusch	6–3, 6–4
Win	4.	5 October 2003	ITF Porto, Portugal	Clay	(Austria) Sybille Bammer	6–2, 6–3
Win	5.	2 May 2004	Open de Cagnes-sur-Mer, France	Clay	(Germany) Anna-Lena Grönefeld	6–4, 6–4
Loss	3.	17 July 2005	ITF Louisville, United States	Hard	(United States) Ashley Harkleroad	6–4, 5–7, 0–6
Loss	4.	18 June 2006	Open Féminin de Marseille, France	Clay	(Russia) Ekaterina Bychkova	1–6, 2–6
Loss	5.	5 May 2008	Zagreb Ladies Open, Croatia	Clay	(Sweden) Sofia Arvidsson	6–7^{(0)}, 2–6
Loss	6.	19 October 2008	Open Saint-Raphaël, France	Hard (i)	(Germany) Angelique Kerber	2–6, 1–6
Loss	7.	21 September 2009	Challenger de Saguenay, Canada	Hard (i)	(Sweden) Sofia Arvidsson	7–5, 4–6, 6–7^{(1)}
Win	6.	25 June 2011	ITF Périgueux, France	Clay	(France) Audrey Bergot	6–4, 6–2
Win	7.	24 June 2012	Montpellier Open, France	Clay	(Colombia) Catalina Castaño	6–2, 7–6^{(4)}
Win	8.	23 July 2012	ITF Les Contamines, France	Hard	(Croatia) Tereza Mrdeža	6–2, 6–2

=== Doubles: 13 (10–3) ===
Result	No.	Date	Tournament	Surface	Partner	Opponents	Score
Win	1.	24 April 2000	ITF Talence, France	Hard	(France) Samantha Schoeffel	(France) Aurore Desert (France) Magalie Lamarre	6–2, 6–2
Loss	1.	7 May 2001	ITF Tortosa, Spain	Clay	(France) Capucine Rousseau	(Austria) Daniela Klemenschits (Austria) Sandra Klemenschits	3–6, 3–6
Win	2.	24 February 2002	ITF Vale do Lobo, Portugal	Hard	(France) Amandine Dulon	(Italy) Anna Floris (Italy) Giulia Meruzzi	7–6^{(3)}, 6–2
Loss	2.	1 July 2002	ITF Mont-de-Marsan, France	Clay	(France) Amandine Dulon	(Austria) Stefanie Haidner (Madagascar) Natacha Randriantefy	4–6, 2–6
Win	3.	20 January 2003	ITF Grenoble, France	Hard (i)	(France) Amandine Dulon	(Belgium) Leslie Butkiewicz (Netherlands) Kim Kilsdonk	5–7, 7–6^{(2)}, 7–6^{(4)}
Win	4.	12 July 2004	ITF Vittel, France	Clay	(France) Stéphanie Cohen-Aloro	(Russia) Maria Goloviznina (Sweden) Maria Wolfbrandt	6–1, 6–3
Loss	3.	18 June 2006	Open de Marseille, France	Clay	(France) Stéphanie Cohen-Aloro	(Spain) Conchita Martínez Granados (Spain) María José Martínez Sánchez	5–7, 4–6
Win	5.	27 September 2009	Challenger de Saguenay, Canada	Hard (i)	(Sweden) Sofia Arvidsson	(Canada) Stéphanie Dubois (Canada) Rebecca Marino	6–3, 6–1
Win	6.	11 June 2012	Open de Marseille, France	Clay	(France) Laura Thorpe	(Germany) Kristina Barrois (Ukraine) Olga Savchuk	6–1, 6–4
Win	7.	18 June 2012	Montpellier Open, France	Clay	(France) Laura Thorpe	(Argentina) Mailen Auroux (Argentina) María Irigoyen	4–6, 6–4, [10–6]
Win	8.	9 July 2012	Open de Biarritz, France	Clay	(France) Laura Thorpe	(Spain) Lara Arruabarrena (Puerto Rico) Monica Puig	6–2, 6–3
Win	9.	20 August 2012	ITF Charleroi, Belgium	Clay	(France) Laura Thorpe	(Belarus) Ilona Kremen (Latvia) Diāna Marcinkēviča	3–6, 6–4, [10–7]
Win	10.	8 October 2012	Open de Touraine, France	Hard (i)	(France) Julie Coin	(Poland) Justyna Jegiołka (Latvia) Diāna Marcinkēviča	7–5, 6–4

== Grand Slam singles performance timeline ==
Key
W	F	SF	QF	#R	RR	Q#	DNQ	A	NH

(W) winner; (F) finalist; (SF) semifinalist; (QF) quarterfinalist; (#R) rounds 4, 3, 2, 1; (RR) round-robin stage; (Q#) qualification round; (DNQ) did not qualify; (A) absent; (NH) not held; (SR) strike rate (events won / competed); (W–L) win–loss record.

Tournament	2009	2008	2007	2006	2005	2004	W–L
Australian Open	2R	1R	1R	1R	1R	A	1–5
French Open	1R	1R	1R	1R	2R	1R	1–6
Wimbledon	1R	1R	2R	QF	2R	1R	6–6
US Open	1R	4R	2R	2R	1R	2R	6–6
Win–loss	1–4	3–4	2–4	5–4	2–4	1–3	14–23
