= 2005 Sunfeast Open – Singles =

Singles
- 2005 Sunfeast Open

Final
- Champion: (Russia) Anastasia Myskina
- Runner-up: (Croatia) Karolina Šprem
- Score: 6–2, 6–2

Events
Singles	Doubles
Sunfeast Open	· 2006 →

In the final, Anastasia Myskina defeated Karolina Šprem to win the first edition of this tournament. This was Myskina's final WTA tour singles title.

== Seeds ==
1. (Russia) Anastasia Myskina (champion)
2. (Russia) Elena Likhovtseva (semifinals)
3. (India) Sania Mirza (second round)
4. (Italy) Maria Elena Camerin (second round)
5. (Italy) Antonella Serra Zanetti (second round)
6. (Spain) Laura Pous Tió (first round)
7. (Croatia) Karolina Šprem (finals)
8. (Japan) Rika Fujiwara (second round)

== Draw ==
=== Key ===
- Q = Qualifier
- WC = Wild card
- LL = Lucky loser
- Alt = Alternate
- SE = Special exempt
- PR = Protected ranking
- ITF = ITF entry
- JE = Junior exempt
- w/o = Walkover
- r = Retired
- d = Defaulted
- SR = Special ranking

=== Finals ===
Semifinals
1	(Russia) Anastasia Myskina	6	6
(Estonia) Kaia Kanepi	3	1
7	(Croatia) Karolina Šprem	4	6	6
2/WC	(Russia) Elena Likhovtseva	6	4	1

Final
1	(Russia) Anastasia Myskina	6	6
7	(Croatia) Karolina Šprem	2	2

=== Top half ===
First round
1	(Russia) A Myskina	6	6
(Romania) E Gallovits	1	0
(Belarus) V Azarenka	3	5
(Russia) G Voskoboeva	6	7
(Japan) R Fuda	1	3
(India) S Uberoi	6	6
(Spain) A Parra Santonja	4	6	4
8	(Japan) R Fujiwara	6	1	6
4	(Italy) ME Camerin	6	6
Q	(India) R Chakravarthi	2	0
(Australia) N Pratt	1	3
(Austria) S Bammer	6	6
(Estonia) K Kanepi	7^{7}	6
Q	(India) A Bhambri	6^{3}	2
WC	(Spain) V Ruano Pascual	4	6	6
6	(Spain) L Pous Tió	6	2	3

Second round
1	(Russia) A Myskina	6	6
(Russia) G Voskoboeva	0	1
(India) S Uberoi	6	6
8	(Japan) R Fujiwara	2	3
4	(Italy) ME Camerin	6	6^{4}	3
(Austria) S Bammer	1	7^{7}	6
(Estonia) K Kanepi	6^{5}	7^{8}	6
WC	(Spain) V Ruano Pascual	7^{7}	6^{6}	1

Quarter Finals
1	(Russia) A Myskina	6	6
(India) S Uberoi	4	2
(Austria) S Bammer	5	3
(Estonia) K Kanepi	7	6

Semi Final
1	(Russia) A Myskina	6	6
(Estonia) K Kanepi	3	1

=== Bottom half ===
First round
7	(Croatia) K Šprem	6	7
(Australia) E Dominikovic	4	5
(Puerto Rico) V Castellvi	6	6
(Switzerland) E Gagliardi	4	4
(Argentina) ME Salerni	4	5
(Hungary) M Czink	6	7
Q	(Japan) J Namigata	2	2
3	(India) S Mirza	6	6
5	(Italy) A Serra Zanetti	6	6
Q	(Chinese Taipei) C-j Chuang	2	3
(Sweden) S Arvidsson	6	6
(Thailand) T Tanasugarn	2	1
(United States) S Rao	7	4	6
WC	(United States) N Uberoi	5	6	4
(Ukraine) Y Fedak	1	3
2/WC	(Russia) E Likhovtseva	6	6

Second round
7	(Croatia) K Šprem	7	3	6
(Puerto Rico) V Castellvi	5	6	1
(Hungary) M Czink	0	6	6
3	(India) S Mirza	6	4	4
5	(Italy) A Serra Zanetti	2	1
(Sweden) S Arvidsson	6	6
(United States) S Rao	3	1
2/WC	(Russia) E Likhovtseva	6	6

Quarter Finals
7	(Croatia) K Šprem	6	6
(Hungary) M Czink	3	1
(Sweden) S Arvidsson	1	5
2/WC	(Russia) E Likhovtseva	6	7

Semi Final
7	(Croatia) K Šprem	4	6	6
2/WC	(Russia) E Likhovtseva	6	4	1

== Qualifying ==
=== Seeds ===
1. (Germany) Marlene Weingärtner (withdrew because of a shoulder injury)
2. (Chinese Taipei) Hsieh Su-wei (qualifying competition)
3. (Chinese Taipei) Chan Chin-wei (qualifying competition)
4. (Chinese Taipei) Chuang Chia-jung (qualified)
5. (Japan) Junri Namigata (qualified)
6. (India) Rushmi Chakravarthi (qualified)
7. (India) Sanaa Bhambri (qualifying competition)
8. (India) Ankita Bhambri (qualified)
9. (India) Isha Lakhani (qualifying competition)

=== Qualifiers ===
1. (India) Ankita Bhambri
2. (Japan) Junri Namigata
3. (India) Rushmi Chakravarthi
4. (Chinese Taipei) Chuang Chia-jung

=== Draw ===
==== First qualifier ====
Qualifying competition
9/WC	(India) Isha Lakhani	3	6	4
8	(India) Ankita Bhambri	6	4	6

==== Second qualifier ====
Qualifying competition
2	(Chinese Taipei) Hsieh Su-wei	7^{7}	3	4
5	(Japan) Junri Namigata	6^{4}	6	6

==== Third qualifier ====
First round				Qualifying competition
				3	(Chinese Taipei) Chan Chin-wei	3	5
	(India) Ragini Vimal	1	3	6	(India) Rushmi Chakravarthi	6	7
6	(India) Rushmi Chakravarthi	6	6

==== Fourth qualifier ====
First round				Qualifying competition
				4	(Chinese Taipei) Chuang Chia-jung	6	6
	(India) Punam Reddy	5	4	7	(India) Sanaa Bhambri	1	4
7	(India) Sanaa Bhambri	7	6
