= 2005 Sunfeast Open – Doubles =

Doubles
- 2005 Sunfeast Open

Final
- Champions: (Russia) Elena Likhovtseva (Russia) Anastasia Myskina
- Runners-up: (United States) Neha Uberoi (India) Shikha Uberoi
- Score: 6–1, 6–0

Events
Singles	Doubles
- Sunfeast Open

In the final, Elena Likhovtseva and Anastasia Myskina defeated Neha Uberoi and Shikha Uberoi 6–1, 6–0 to win the first edition of this tournament.

== Seeds ==
1. (Russia) Elena Likhovtseva / (Russia) Anastasia Myskina (champions)
2. (Switzerland) Emmanuelle Gagliardi / (Argentina) María Emilia Salerni (first round)
3. (Australia) Nicole Pratt / (Thailand) Tamarine Tanasugarn (first round)
4. (India) Sania Mirza / (Spain) Virginia Ruano Pascual (semifinals)

== Results ==
Key

- Q = Qualifier
- WC = Wild card
- LL = Lucky loser
- Alt = Alternate
- ITF = ITF entry
- PR = Protected ranking
- SR = Special ranking
- SE = Special exempt
- JE = Junior exempt
- JR = Junior Accelerator Programme entrant
- CO = College Accelerator Programme entrant
- NG = Next Gen Accelerator Program entrant
- w/o = Walkover
- r = Retired
- d = Defaulted

=== Draw ===
First round
1	(Russia) E Likhovtseva (Russia) A Myskina	6	6
(India) A Bhambri (India) S Bhambri	2	0
(Spain) A Parra Santonja (Italy) A Serra Zanetti	7^{7}	2	3
(Chinese Taipei) C-w Chan (Chinese Taipei) S-w Hsieh	6^{5}	6	6
4	(India) S Mirza (Spain) V Ruano Pascual	6	6
WC	(India) P Reddy (India) R Vimal	1	0
(Australia) E Dominikovic (Russia) G Voskoboeva	4	4
(Puerto Rico) V Castellvi (United States) S Rao	6	6
(Romania) E Gallovits (Estonia) K Kanepi	4	3
(United States) N Uberoi (India) S Uberoi	6	6
(Chinese Taipei) C-j Chuang (Japan) R Fujiwara	6	6
3	(Australia) N Pratt (Thailand) T Tanasugarn	3	2
(Hungary) M Czink (Ukraine) Y Fedak	7^{10}	6
(India) R Chakravarthi (Japan) J Namigata	6^{8}	4
(Italy) ME Camerin (Croatia) K Šprem	6	6
2	(Switzerland) E Gagliardi (Argentina) ME Salerni	4	4

Quarterfinals
1	(Russia) E Likhovtseva (Russia) A Myskina	6	7
(Chinese Taipei) C-w Chan (Chinese Taipei) S-w Hsieh	4	5
4	(India) S Mirza (Spain) V Ruano Pascual	6	6
(Puerto Rico) V Castellvi (United States) S Rao	1	3
(United States) N Uberoi (India) S Uberoi	6	6
(Chinese Taipei) C-j Chuang (Japan) R Fujiwara	4	2
(Hungary) M Czink (Ukraine) Y Fedak	5	6	6
(Italy) ME Camerin (Croatia) K Šprem	7	1	2

Semifinals
1	(Russia) E Likhovtseva (Russia) A Myskina	4	6	7
4	(India) S Mirza (Spain) V Ruano Pascual	6	3	5
(United States) N Uberoi (India) S Uberoi	7^{7}	1	6
(Hungary) M Czink (Ukraine) Y Fedak	6^{5}	6	3

Final
1	(Russia) E Likhovtseva (Russia) A Myskina	6	6
(United States) N Uberoi (India) S Uberoi	1	0
