= 2005 Sunfeast Open =

- Date: 19 - 25 September 2005
- Edition: 1st
- Location: Kolkata, India

Champions

Singles
- (Russia) Anastasia Myskina

Doubles
- (Russia) Anastasia Myskina / (Russia) Elena Likhovtseva
Sunfeast Open	· 2006 →

The 2005 Sunfeast Open was the first edition of the WTA tennis tournament Sunfeast Open held in Kolkata, West Bengal, India for women's professional tennis from 19 to 25 September 2005. The prize money was US$175,000.

== Champions ==
=== Singles ===
- (Russia) Anastasia Myskina (RUS) defeated (Croatia) Karolina Šprem (CRO) 6–2, 6–2

=== Doubles ===
- (Russia) Elena Likhovtseva (RUS) / (Russia) Anastasia Myskina (RUS) defeated Neha Uberoi (United States) / (India) Shikha Uberoi (IND) 6–1, 6–0

== Entrants ==
=== Seeds ===
- The following players were seeded

Seed	Country	Player name
1	RUS	Anastasia Myskina
2	RUS	Elena Likhovtseva
3	IND	Sania Mirza
4	ITA	Maria Elena Camerin
5	ITA	Antonella Serra Zanetti
6	ESP	Laura Pous Tió
7	CRO	Karolina Šprem
8	JPN	Rika Fujiwara

=== Qualifiers ===
- The following players received entry from the Qualifying Draw.
- (India) Rushmi Chakravarthi
- (India) Ankita Bhambri
- (Japan) Junri Namigata
- (Chinese Taipei) Chuang Chia-jung

=== Wildcards ===
- The following players received wildcards into the Main Draw.
- (Spain) Virginia Ruano Pascual
- (United States) Neha Uberoi
- (Russia) Elena Likhovtseva
