= 2004 US Open – Women's singles =

Women's singles
- 2004 US Open

Final
- Champion: (Russia) Svetlana Kuznetsova
- Runner-up: (Russia) Elena Dementieva
- Score: 6–3, 7–5

Details
- Draw: 128
- Seeds: 32

Events
Singles	men	women		boys	girls
Doubles	men	women	mixed	boys	girls
WC Singles	men	women	quad
WC Doubles	men	women	quad
Legends	men	women	mixed
- US Open

Svetlana Kuznetsova defeated Elena Dementieva in the final, 6–3, 7–5 to win the women's singles tennis title at the 2004 US Open. It was her first major title. Kuznetsova was the third Russian woman to win a major, after Anastasia Myskina and Maria Sharapova (who won the French Open and Wimbledon, respectively, earlier in the season). This was also the second-ever all-Russian major final (the first being at the French Open earlier in the season, where Myskina defeated Dementieva).

Justine Henin was the defending champion, but was defeated by Nadia Petrova in the fourth round. As a result, Amélie Mauresmo became the new world No. 1 following the tournament.

This marked the first US Open main draw appearance for future champion Samantha Stosur, who was defeated by Petrova in the second round.

The quarterfinal match between Serena Williams and Jennifer Capriati is often considered the catalyst for the International Tennis Federation (ITF) adoption of Hawk-Eye triangulation technology to review line calls. Hawk-Eye was unofficially used for television coverage for the match, with results suggesting that several crucial points awarded to Capriati were incorrectly called. The most significant of these calls was a potential Williams winner at deuce in the first game of the final set that appeared to be well within the left baseline; while the line judge called the ball in, the chair umpire Mariana Alves overruled to award the point to Capriati. Capriati ultimately ended up winning the deuce, the set, and the match. Following outcry from spectators and the press, the United States Tennis Association suspended Alves for the remainder of the tournament and apologized to Williams. The ITF tested the Hawk-Eye system in an official capacity the next year, ultimately approving it for official use.

== Seeds ==
1. (Belgium) Justine Henin (fourth round)
2. (France) Amélie Mauresmo (quarterfinals)
3. (United States) Serena Williams (quarterfinals)
4. (Russia) Anastasia Myskina (second round)
5. (United States) Lindsay Davenport (semifinals)
6. (Russia) Elena Dementieva (final)
7. (Russia) Maria Sharapova (third round)
8. (United States) Jennifer Capriati (semifinals)
9. (Russia) Svetlana Kuznetsova (champion)
10. (Russia) Vera Zvonareva (fourth round)
11. (United States) Venus Williams (fourth round)
12. (Japan) Ai Sugiyama (fourth round)
13. (Argentina) Paola Suárez (third round)
14. (Russia) Nadia Petrova (quarterfinals)
15. (Switzerland) Patty Schnyder (fourth round)
16. (Italy) Francesca Schiavone (fourth round)
17. (Australia) Alicia Molik (second round)
18. (Croatia) Karolina Šprem (first round)
19. (Italy) Silvia Farina Elia (third round)
20. (United States) Chanda Rubin (third round)
21. (United States) Amy Frazier (third round)
22. (Bulgaria) Magdalena Maleeva (second round)
23. (Colombia) Fabiola Zuluaga (third round)
24. (Israel) Anna Smashnova-Pistolesi (first round)
25. (Russia) Elena Likhovtseva (first round)
26. (Russia) Elena Bovina (third round)
27. (France) Mary Pierce (fourth round)
28. (France) Nathalie Dechy (third round)
29. (Greece) Eleni Daniilidou (fourth round)
30. (France) Tatiana Golovin (third round)
31. (Venezuela) María Vento-Kabchi (third round)
32. (United States) Meghann Shaughnessy (first round)

== Draw ==
Key

- Q = Qualifier
- WC = Wild card
- LL = Lucky loser
- Alt = Alternate
- ITF = ITF entry
- PR = Protected ranking
- SR = Special ranking
- SE = Special exempt
- JE = Junior exempt
- JR = Junior Accelerator Programme entrant
- CO = College Accelerator Programme entrant
- NG = Next Gen Accelerator Program entrant
- w/o = Walkover
- r = Retired
- d = Defaulted

=== Finals ===
Quarterfinals
14	(Russia) Nadia Petrova	6^{4}	3
9	(Russia) Svetlana Kuznetsova	7^{7}	6
(Japan) Shinobu Asagoe	1	1
5	(United States) Lindsay Davenport	6	6
8	(United States) Jennifer Capriati	2	6	6
3	(United States) Serena Williams	6	4	4
6	(Russia) Elena Dementieva	4	6	7^{7}
2	(France) Amélie Mauresmo	6	4	6^{1}

Semifinals
9	(Russia) Svetlana Kuznetsova	1	6	6
5	(United States) Lindsay Davenport	6	2	4
8	(United States) Jennifer Capriati	0	6	6^{5}
6	(Russia) Elena Dementieva	6	2	7^{7}

Final
9	(Russia) Svetlana Kuznetsova	6	7
6	(Russia) Elena Dementieva	3	5

=== Top half ===
==== Section 1 ====
First round
1	(Belgium) J Henin-Hardenne	6	6
Q	(Czech Republic) N Vaidišová	1	4
Q	(Israel) T Obziler	7	6
Q	(Indonesia) A Widjaja	5	3
(Russia) A Jidkova	5	3
(United States) L Raymond	7	6
(Russia) M Kirilenko	7^{7}	6
25	(Russia) E Likhovtseva	6^{3}	3
19	(Italy) S Farina Elia	3	6	6
Q	(United States) A Spears	6	2	4
(Russia) T Panova	3	2
(Slovenia) K Srebotnik	6	6
(Australia) S Stosur	7	6
(France) V Razzano	5	4
(China) J Zheng	0	1
14	(Russia) N Petrova	6	6

Second round
1	(Belgium) J Henin-Hardenne	6	5	6
Q	(Israel) T Obziler	2	7	2
(United States) L Raymond	4	7^{7}	6
(Russia) M Kirilenko	6	6^{3}	2
19	(Italy) S Farina Elia	6	6
(Slovenia) K Srebotnik	2	1
(Australia) S Stosur	2	2
14	(Russia) N Petrova	6	6

Third round
1	(Belgium) J Henin-Hardenne	6	6
(United States) L Raymond	4	3
19	(Italy) S Farina Elia	6	6^{6}	6^{3}
14	(Russia) N Petrova	4	7^{8}	7^{7}

Fourth round
1	(Belgium) J Henin-Hardenne	3	2
14	(Russia) N Petrova	6	6

==== Section 2 ====
First round
9	(Russia) S Kuznetsova	6	6
Q	(Bulgaria) S Karatantcheva	2	0
(Colombia) C Castaño	6	1	3
(Australia) N Pratt	3	6	6
(Venezuela) M Sequera	1	2
(Puerto Rico) K Brandi	6	6
WC	(United States) K McCain	2	2
21	(United States) A Frazier	6	6
27	(France) M Pierce	6	6
(France) É Loit	1	2
WC	(United States) A Stevenson	4	5
(Spain) V Ruano Pascual	6	7
(Serbia and Montenegro) J Janković	6	6
LL	(Spain) N Llagostera Vives	3	4
(United States) L Granville	3	7	5
7	(Russia) M Sharapova	6	5	7

Second round
9	(Russia) S Kuznetsova	6	6
(Australia) N Pratt	3	3
(Puerto Rico) K Brandi	4	1
21	(United States) A Frazier	6	6
27	(France) M Pierce	6	6
(Spain) V Ruano Pascual	0	1
(Serbia and Montenegro) J Janković	0	7^{7}	1
7	(Russia) M Sharapova	6	6^{5}	6

Third round
9	(Russia) S Kuznetsova	7^{7}	7
21	(United States) A Frazier	6^{3}	5
27	(France) M Pierce	4	6	6
7	(Russia) M Sharapova	6	2	3

Fourth round
9	(Russia) S Kuznetsova	7^{7}	6
27	(France) M Pierce	6^{5}	2

==== Section 3 ====
First round
4	(Russia) A Myskina	6	6
(Slovakia) L Cervanová	1	0
(Austria) B Schett	6	4	2
Q	(Russia) A Chakvetadze	1	6	6
(Czech Republic) B Strýcová	5	3
(Spain) A Medina Garrigues	7	6
(Croatia) S Talaja	6	3	5
29	(Greece) E Daniilidou	3	6	7
24	(Israel) A Smashnova-Pistolesi	6	4	1
(Japan) S Asagoe	3	6	6
(Slovenia) T Pisnik	2	1
(United States) J Craybas	6	6
(Madagascar) D Randriantefy	6	6
WC	(United States) J Kirkland	4	4
Q	(China) N Liu	1	5
13	(Argentina) P Suárez	6	7

Second round
4	(Russia) A Myskina	6^{3}	3
Q	(Russia) A Chakvetadze	7^{7}	6
(Spain) A Medina Garrigues	6	5	4
29	(Greece) E Daniilidou	1	7	6
(Japan) S Asagoe	7	6
(United States) J Craybas	5	3
(Madagascar) D Randriantefy	2	2
13	(Argentina) P Suárez	6	6

Third round
Q	(Russia) A Chakvetadze	2	4
29	(Greece) E Daniilidou	6	6
(Japan) S Asagoe	6	6
13	(Argentina) P Suárez	4	4

Fourth round
29	(Greece) E Daniilidou	6^{4}	6	3
(Japan) S Asagoe	7^{7}	4	6

==== Section 4 ====
First round
11	(United States) V Williams	6	7^{7}
(Hungary) P Mandula	3	6^{3}
(Japan) S Obata	3	6	5
Q	(United States) S Uberoi	6	3	7
Q	(Italy) An Serra Zanetti	7	7
(United States) M Washington	5	5
(Spain) M Sánchez Lorenzo	2	2
20	(United States) C Rubin	6	6
26	(Russia) E Bovina	6	6
(Spain) M Marrero	3	0
(Italy) ME Camerin	6	6
(Hungary) M Czink	4	2
(Spain) A Parra Santonja	6	7^{7}
(Germany) M Weingärtner	2	6^{5}
(Slovakia) Ľ Kurhajcová	4	0
5	(United States) L Davenport	6	6

Second round
11	(United States) V Williams	7	6
Q	(United States) S Uberoi	5	1
Q	(Italy) An Serra Zanetti	5	3
20	(United States) C Rubin	7	6
26	(Russia) E Bovina	6	7
(Italy) ME Camerin	2	5
(Spain) A Parra Santonja	4	2
5	(United States) L Davenport	6	6

Third round
11	(United States) V Williams	7^{7}	6
20	(United States) C Rubin	6^{4}	3
26	(Russia) E Bovina	6^{7}	2
5	(United States) L Davenport	7^{9}	6

Fourth round
11	(United States) V Williams	5	4
5	(United States) L Davenport	7	6

=== Bottom half ===
==== Section 5 ====
First round
8	(United States) J Capriati	2	6	6
(Czech Republic) D Chládková	6	1	2
Q	(Canada) M Drake	2	4
(Spain) M Serna	6	6
(Russia) V Dushevina	6	6
(Hungary) A Kapros	1	3
(France) M Bartoli	6	6
32	(United States) M Shaughnessy	4	4
18	(Croatia) K Šprem	3	6	4
(Croatia) J Kostanić	6	2	6
(Italy) R Grande	7	1	2
Q	(Russia) E Linetskaia	5	6	6
(Thailand) T Tanasugarn	6^{3}	3
(Argentina) G Dulko	7^{7}	6
(United States) T Ashley	5	2
12	(Japan) A Sugiyama	7	6

Second round
8	(United States) J Capriati	6	6
(Spain) M Serna	0	2
(Russia) V Dushevina	5	6	6
(France) M Bartoli	7	2	2
(Croatia) J Kostanić	6	6
Q	(Russia) E Linetskaia	4	3
(Argentina) G Dulko	2	4
12	(Japan) A Sugiyama	6	6

Third round
8	(United States) J Capriati	6	6^{4}	6
(Russia) V Dushevina	0	7^{7}	3
(Croatia) J Kostanić	1	3
12	(Japan) A Sugiyama	6	6

Fourth round
8	(United States) J Capriati	7	6
12	(Japan) A Sugiyama	5	2

==== Section 6 ====
First round
15	(Switzerland) P Schnyder	7^{7}	6
Q	(Italy) R Vinci	6	0
(Czech Republic) I Benešová	6	3	6
WC	(United States) B Mattek	4	6	3
(Slovakia) D Hantuchová	1	7^{7}	7^{11}
LL	(France) C Pin	6	6^{5}	6^{9}
(France) S Cohen-Aloro	0	2
17	(Australia) A Molik	6	6
30	(France) T Golovin	6	6
(Germany) A Barna	2	4
(Japan) A Morigami	6	6
(Switzerland) E Gagliardi	2	2
(United States) L Lee-Waters	2	6	6
(Luxembourg) C Schaul	6	2	4
(Czech Republic) S Kleinová	1	3
3	(United States) S Williams	6	6

Second round
15	(Switzerland) P Schnyder	6	6
(Czech Republic) I Benešová	4	1
(Slovakia) D Hantuchová	6	6
17	(Australia) A Molik	4	3
30	(France) T Golovin	6	6
(Japan) A Morigami	4	4
(United States) L Lee-Waters	4	3
3	(United States) S Williams	6	6

Third round
15	(Switzerland) P Schnyder	6	4	7^{8}
(Slovakia) D Hantuchová	4	6	6^{6}
30	(France) T Golovin	5	4
3	(United States) S Williams	7	6

Fourth round
15	(Switzerland) P Schnyder	4	2
3	(United States) S Williams	6	6

==== Section 7 ====
First round
6	(Russia) E Dementieva	2	6	6
(Russia) D Safina	6	1	2
Q	(France) S Beltrame	7^{7}	4	6
(Slovakia) M Suchá	6^{5}	6	1
WC	(United States) J Jackson	6^{2}	7	4
(Zimbabwe) C Black	7^{7}	5	6
(Serbia and Montenegro) J Dokić	6	0	5
28	(France) N Dechy	3	6	7
23	(Colombia) F Zuluaga	6	6
(Switzerland) M Casanova	3	4
(Italy) T Garbin	6	6
(Italy) M Santangelo	2	1
(Belgium) E Callens	2	6	7
Q	(Germany) A-L Grönefeld	6	4	5
(Slovakia) H Nagyová	1	1
10	(Russia) V Zvonareva	6	6

Second round
6	(Russia) E Dementieva	6	6
Q	(France) S Beltrame	3	2
(Zimbabwe) C Black	2	5
28	(France) N Dechy	6	7
23	(Colombia) F Zuluaga	6	6^{7}	6
(Italy) T Garbin	3	7^{9}	2
(Belgium) E Callens	3	3
10	(Russia) V Zvonareva	6	6

Third round
6	(Russia) E Dementieva	w/o
28	(France) N Dechy
23	(Colombia) F Zuluaga	4	5
10	(Russia) V Zvonareva	6	7

Fourth round
6	(Russia) E Dementieva	1	6	6
10	(Russia) V Zvonareva	6	4	3

==== Section 8 ====
First round
16	(Italy) F Schiavone	6	6
(Czech Republic) K Koukalová	1	3
(United States) S Perry	6^{1}	7^{7}	4
Q	(France) S Foretz	7^{7}	6^{5}	6
WC	(United States) A Haynes	6^{4}	6	7^{7}
(Ukraine) T Perebiynis	7^{7}	1	6^{5}
(Italy) F Pennetta	6	4	4
22	(Bulgaria) M Maleeva	2	6	6
31	(Venezuela) M Vento-Kabchi	0	6	6
(Spain) C Martínez	6	2	3
WC	(United States) J Hopkins	3	7^{7}	1
Q	(Germany) J Schruff	6	6^{4}	6
WC	(United States) A Liu	6	3	1
(Ukraine) J Vakulenko	3	6	6
(United States) M Irvin	4	2
2	(France) A Mauresmo	6	6

Second round
16	(Italy) F Schiavone	6	6
Q	(France) S Foretz	2	3
WC	(United States) A Haynes	6	6
22	(Bulgaria) M Maleeva	2	3
31	(Venezuela) M Vento-Kabchi	6	2	6
Q	(Germany) J Schruff	1	6	2
(Ukraine) J Vakulenko	6	2	2
2	(France) A Mauresmo	3	6	6

Third round
16	(Italy) F Schiavone	6	7^{7}
WC	(United States) A Haynes	3	6^{3}
31	(Venezuela) M Vento-Kabchi	2	0
2	(France) A Mauresmo	6	6

Fourth round
16	(Italy) F Schiavone	4	2
2	(France) A Mauresmo	6	6

== Championship match statistics ==
Category	(Russia) Kuznetsova	(Russia) Dementieva
1st serve %	30/54 (56%)	51/71 (72%)
1st serve points won	19 of 30 = 63%	28 of 51 = 55%
2nd serve points won	15 of 24 = 63%	7 of 20 = 35%
Total service points won	34 of 54 = 62.96%	35 of 71 = 49.30%
Aces	3	0
Double faults	0	4
Winners	33	7
Unforced errors	35	22
Net points won	11 of 13 = 88%	4 of 5 = 80%
Break points converted	5 of 10 = 50%	3 of 3 = 100%
Return points won	36 of 71 = 51%	20 of 54 = 37%
Total points won	70	55

Preceded by 2004 Wimbledon Championships – Women's singles	Grand Slam women's singles	Succeeded by 2005 Australian Open – Women's singles
