= 2006 Australian Open – Women's singles =

Women's singles
- 2006 Australian Open

Final
- Champion: (France) Amélie Mauresmo
- Runner-up: (Belgium) Justine Henin-Hardenne
- Score: 6–1, 2–0 ret.

Details
- Draw: 128 (12Q / 8WC)
- Seeds: 32

Events
Singles	men	women		boys	girls
Doubles	men	women	mixed	boys	girls
WC Singles	men	women	quad
WC Doubles	men	women	quad
Legends	men	women	mixed
- Australian Open

Amélie Mauresmo defeated Justine Henin-Hardenne in the final, 6–1, 2–0 ret., to win the women's singles tennis title at the 2006 Australian Open. It was her first major title. Henin-Hardenne was suffering from stomach cramps resulting from the accidental misuse of anti-inflammatories for a chronic shoulder injury. This was Mauresmo's third match of the tournament where her opponent retired. Mauresmo and Henin-Hardenne would have a rematch in the Wimbledon final later that year, where Mauresmo would win in three sets.

Serena Williams was the defending champion, but was defeated in the third round by Daniela Hantuchová.

This tournament saw three-time Australian Open champion Martina Hingis make her first major appearance since the 2002 US Open, after a three-year absence from the sport. It marked the first major main draw appearance for future world No. 1 and two-time Australian Open champion Victoria Azarenka.

== Seeds ==
1. (United States) Lindsay Davenport (quarterfinals)
2. (Belgium) Kim Clijsters (semifinals, retired due to an ankle injury)
3. (France) Amélie Mauresmo (champion)
4. (Russia) Maria Sharapova (semifinals)
5. (France) Mary Pierce (second round)
6. (Russia) Nadia Petrova (quarterfinals)
7. (Switzerland) Patty Schnyder (quarterfinals)
8. (Belgium) Justine Henin-Hardenne (final, retired due to stomach cramps)
9. (Russia) Elena Dementieva (first round)
10. (United States) Venus Williams (first round)
11. (France) Nathalie Dechy (first round)
12. (Russia) Anastasia Myskina (fourth round)
13. (United States) Serena Williams (third round)
14. (Russia) Svetlana Kuznetsova (fourth round)
15. (Italy) Francesca Schiavone (fourth round)
16. (Czech Republic) Nicole Vaidišová (fourth round)
17. (Slovakia) Daniela Hantuchová (fourth round)
18. (Russia) Elena Likhovtseva (second round)
19. (Russia) Dinara Safina (second round)
20. (Italy) Flavia Pennetta (third round)
21. (Serbia and Montenegro) Ana Ivanovic (second round)
22. (Germany) Anna-Lena Grönefeld (second round)
23. (Serbia and Montenegro) Jelena Janković (second round)
24. (France) Tatiana Golovin (first round)
25. (Russia) Maria Kirilenko (third round)
26. (Japan) Ai Sugiyama (first round)
27. (France) Marion Bartoli (second round)
28. (Spain) Anabel Medina Garrigues (first round)
29. (Czech Republic) Klára Koukalová (first round)
30. (Russia) Vera Zvonareva (first round)
31. (Argentina) Gisela Dulko (second round)
32. (India) Sania Mirza (second round)

== Draw ==
Key

- Q = Qualifier
- WC = Wild card
- LL = Lucky loser
- Alt = Alternate
- ITF = ITF entry
- PR = Protected ranking
- SR = Special ranking
- SE = Special exempt
- JE = Junior exempt
- JR = Junior Accelerator Programme entrant
- CO = College Accelerator Programme entrant
- NG = Next Gen Accelerator Program entrant
- w/o = Walkover
- r = Retired
- d = Defaulted

=== Finals ===
Quarterfinals
1	(United States) Lindsay Davenport	6	2	3
8	(Belgium) Justine Henin-Hardenne	2	6	6
4	(Russia) Maria Sharapova	7^{8}	6
6	(Russia) Nadia Petrova	6^{6}	4
7	(Switzerland) Patty Schnyder	3	0
3	(France) Amélie Mauresmo	6	6
WC	(Switzerland) Martina Hingis	3	6	4
2	(Belgium) Kim Clijsters	6	2	6

Semifinals
8	(Belgium) Justine Henin-Hardenne	4	6	6
4	(Russia) Maria Sharapova	6	1	4
3	(France) Amélie Mauresmo	5	6	3
2	(Belgium) Kim Clijsters	7	2	2^{r}

Final
8	(Belgium) Justine Henin-Hardenne	1	0^{r}
3	(France) Amélie Mauresmo	6	2

=== Top half ===
==== Section 1 ====
First round
1	(United States) L Davenport	6	6
WC	(Australia) C Dellacqua	2	1
(Ukraine) A Bondarenko	4	2
(Croatia) K Šprem	6	6
(Switzerland) E Gagliardi	4	3
(Russia) G Voskoboeva	6	6
(Russia) E Linetskaya	1	1	r
25	(Russia) M Kirilenko	6	3
24	(France) T Golovin	4	6	4
(Italy) M Santangelo	6	4	6
(Slovenia) K Srebotnik	6	6
(France) S Foretz	4	3
(Russia) T Panova	6	5	1
(Spain) A Parra Santonja	4	7	6
WC	(Australia) L Breadmore	1	3
14	(Russia) S Kuznetsova	6	6

Second round
1	(United States) L Davenport	7^{7}	6
(Croatia) K Šprem	6^{4}	3
(Russia) G Voskoboeva	6^{1}	4
25	(Russia) M Kirilenko	7^{7}	6
(Italy) M Santangelo	7^{7}	5	6
(Slovenia) K Srebotnik	6^{5}	7	3
(Spain) A Parra Santonja	2	7^{7}	2
14	(Russia) S Kuznetsova	6	6^{3}	6

Third round
1	(United States) L Davenport	6	4	6
25	(Russia) M Kirilenko	4	6	2
(Italy) M Santangelo	3	1
14	(Russia) S Kuznetsova	6	6

Fourth round
1	(United States) L Davenport	6	6
14	(Russia) S Kuznetsova	2	4

==== Section 2 ====
First round
10	(United States) V Williams	6	0	7
(Bulgaria) T Pironkova	2	6	9
Q	(Germany) K Wörle	7	2	0
(United States) L Granville	5	6	6
(Spain) L Domínguez Lino	2	6^{1}
(Spain) V Ruano Pascual	6	7^{7}
(United States) L Raymond	6^{4}	6^{5}
18	(Russia) E Likhovtseva	7^{7}	7^{7}
26	(Japan) A Sugiyama	4	3
(Spain) C Martínez Granados	6	6
WC	(Australia) J Dokić	6	6^{6}	1
(France) V Razzano	3	7^{8}	6
(Czech Republic) H Šromová	3
(Japan) A Morigami	0	r
(Poland) M Domachowska	2	1
8	(Belgium) J Henin-Hardenne	6	6

Second round
(Bulgaria) T Pironkova	5	2
(United States) L Granville	7	6
(Spain) V Ruano Pascual	6	6
18	(Russia) E Likhovtseva	4	4
(Spain) C Martínez Granados	6^{3}	3
(France) V Razzano	7^{7}	6
(Czech Republic) H Šromová	6^{2}	1
8	(Belgium) J Henin-Hardenne	7^{7}	6

Third round
(United States) L Granville	3	3
(Spain) V Ruano Pascual	6	6
(France) V Razzano	4	1
8	(Belgium) J Henin-Hardenne	6	6

Fourth round
(Spain) V Ruano Pascual	0	3
8	(Belgium) J Henin-Hardenne	6	6

==== Section 3 ====
First round
4	(Russia) M Sharapova	6	6
(Germany) S Klösel	2	1
Q	(United States) A Harkleroad	6	6
(China) S Peng	4	1
(United States) M Washington	1	2
(Croatia) J Kostanić	6	6
(Czech Republic) Z Ondrášková	6	6
28	(Spain) A Medina Garrigues	3	4
17	(Slovakia) D Hantuchová	3	6	6
(Japan) S Obata	6	3	0
(Madagascar) D Randriantefy	3	6	1
WC	(Uzbekistan) A Amanmuradova	6	2	6
(Argentina) M Díaz Oliva	6	5	4
(France) C Pin	2	7	6
(China) N Li	3	7^{7}	2
13	(United States) S Williams	6	6^{1}	6

Second round
4	(Russia) M Sharapova	6	7
Q	(United States) A Harkleroad	1	5
(Croatia) J Kostanić	6	6
(Czech Republic) Z Ondrášková	2	1
17	(Slovakia) D Hantuchová	6	6
WC	(Uzbekistan) A Amanmuradova	4	1
(France) C Pin	3	1
13	(United States) S Williams	6	6

Third round
4	(Russia) M Sharapova	6	6
(Croatia) J Kostanić	0	1
17	(Slovakia) D Hantuchová	6	7^{7}
13	(United States) S Williams	1	6^{5}

Fourth round
4	(Russia) M Sharapova	6	6
17	(Slovakia) D Hantuchová	4	4

==== Section 4 ====
First round
9	(Russia) E Dementieva	5	2
(Germany) J Schruff	7	6
(Russia) E Vesnina	6	6
Q	(China) T Li	2	3
Q	(Israel) T Obziler	1	6	4
Q	(Ukraine) O Savchuk	6	3	6
(United States) J Craybas	2	6	4
23	(Serbia and Montenegro) J Janković	6	4	6
29	(Czech Republic) K Koukalová	1	7	2
(Russia) E Bychkova	6	5	6
(Italy) ME Camerin	6	6
Q	(Austria) Y Meusburger	4	2
Q	(Slovakia) J Gajdošová	6	2	3
(Germany) M Müller	1	6	6
WC	(Australia) S Ferguson	2	1
6	(Russia) N Petrova	6	6

Second round
(Germany) J Schruff	0	5
(Russia) E Vesnina	6	7
Q	(Ukraine) O Savchuk	6	6
23	(Serbia and Montenegro) J Janković	3	4
(Russia) E Bychkova	6	6^{7}	2
(Italy) ME Camerin	4	7^{9}	6
(Germany) M Müller	4	1
6	(Russia) N Petrova	6	6

Third round
(Russia) E Vesnina	5	6	6
Q	(Ukraine) O Savchuk	7	2	4
(Italy) ME Camerin	1	2
6	(Russia) N Petrova	6	6

Fourth round
(Russia) E Vesnina	3	1
6	(Russia) N Petrova	6	6

=== Bottom half ===
==== Section 5 ====
First round
7	(Switzerland) P Schnyder	6	6
(Greece) E Daniilidou	4	3
(Israel) S Pe'er	6	1	4
(Japan) S Asagoe	3	6	6
WC	(France) A Cornet	2	6	2
(Japan) A Nakamura	6	4	6
(Estonia) M Ani	0	6^{7}
31	(Argentina) G Dulko	6	7^{9}
19	(Russia) D Safina	6	6
(Italy) T Garbin	0	1
(Venezuela) M Vento-Kabchi	1	2
(Sweden) S Arvidsson	6	6
(United States) J Jackson	7^{7}	6
Q	(Thailand) T Tanasugarn	6^{5}	2
(Ukraine) Y Fedak	6^{6}	1
12	(Russia) A Myskina	7^{8}	6

Second round
7	(Switzerland) P Schnyder	6	7^{9}
(Japan) S Asagoe	1	6^{7}
(Japan) A Nakamura	6	6
31	(Argentina) G Dulko	1	1
19	(Russia) D Safina	4	0
(Sweden) S Arvidsson	6	6
(United States) J Jackson	6^{4}	6	3
12	(Russia) A Myskina	7^{7}	0	6

Third round
7	(Switzerland) P Schnyder	6	6
(Japan) A Nakamura	2	3
(Sweden) S Arvidsson	3	1
12	(Russia) A Myskina	6	6

Fourth round
7	(Switzerland) P Schnyder	6	6
12	(Russia) A Myskina	2	1

==== Section 6 ====
First round
16	(Czech Republic) N Vaidišová	6	6
Q	(Belarus) A Yakimova	1	3
(Russia) A Chakvetadze	5	6	6
(China) J Zheng	7	2	4
(Slovakia) M Suchá	3	6	6
(Israel) A Smashnova	6	3	4
Q	(Zimbabwe) C Black	2	6	3
20	(Italy) F Pennetta	6	2	6
32	(India) S Mirza	7^{8}	6
Q	(Belarus) V Azarenka	6^{6}	2
(Netherlands) M Krajicek	6	7^{7}
(Puerto Rico) K Brandi	4	6^{1}
(France) É Loit	6	6
(Ukraine) V Kutuzova	2	0
(China) T Sun	6	2	2
3	(France) A Mauresmo	4	6	6

Second round
16	(Czech Republic) N Vaidišová	6	6
(Russia) A Chakvetadze	2	1
(Slovakia) M Suchá	3	0
20	(Italy) F Pennetta	6	6
32	(India) S Mirza	3	5
(Netherlands) M Krajicek	6	7
(France) É Loit	6^{1}	2
3	(France) A Mauresmo	7^{7}	6

Third round
16	(Czech Republic) N Vaidišová	6	6
20	(Italy) F Pennetta	4	2
(Netherlands) M Krajicek	2	0^{r}
3	(France) A Mauresmo	6	0

Fourth round
16	(Czech Republic) N Vaidišová	1	1
3	(France) A Mauresmo	6	6

==== Section 7 ====
First round
5	(France) M Pierce	6	6
WC	(Australia) N Pratt	1	1
(Czech Republic) I Benešová	2	6	7
(Japan) R Fujiwara	6	1	5
(Finland) E Laine	6	6
(Spain) N Llagostera Vives	1	1
WC	(Switzerland) M Hingis	6	6
30	(Russia) V Zvonareva	1	2
21	(Serbia and Montenegro) A Ivanovic	6	6
(United States) S Perry	4	4
(Australia) S Stosur	6	6
(France) S Brémond	3	4
(Czech Republic) E Birnerová	5	4
(Austria) S Bammer	7	6
(China) Z Yan	6^{5}	6	6
11	(France) N Dechy	7^{7}	2	3

Second round
5	(France) M Pierce	3	5
(Czech Republic) I Benešová	6	7
(Finland) E Laine	1	1
WC	(Switzerland) M Hingis	6	6
21	(Serbia and Montenegro) A Ivanovic	3	5
(Australia) S Stosur	6	7
(Austria) S Bammer	6	6
(China) Z Yan	3	4

Third round
(Czech Republic) I Benešová	4	1
WC	(Switzerland) M Hingis	6	6
(Australia) S Stosur	7	4	6
(Austria) S Bammer	5	6	3

Fourth round
WC	(Switzerland) M Hingis	6	7^{10}
(Australia) S Stosur	1	6^{8}

==== Section 8 ====
First round
15	(Italy) F Schiavone	6	7
(Italy) A Serra Zanetti	2	5
(Russia) V Dushevina	7	3	1
(Colombia) C Castaño	5	6	6
(Czech Republic) L Šafářová	4	3
(Spain) M Sánchez Lorenzo	6	6
(Spain) L Pous Tió	6	4	5
22	(Germany) A-L Grönefeld	2	6	7
27	(France) M Bartoli	6	6
(United States) A Frazier	3	2
(Italy) R Vinci	7	6
(United States) M Shaughnessy	5	4
Q	(China) M Yuan	6	6
(Hungary) M Czink	4	2
(South Korea) Y-j Cho	3	0
2	(Belgium) K Clijsters	6	6

Second round
15	(Italy) F Schiavone	6	4	6
(Colombia) C Castaño	1	6	3
(Spain) M Sánchez Lorenzo	4	6	6
22	(Germany) A-L Grönefeld	6	4	1
27	(France) M Bartoli	4	6	3
(Italy) R Vinci	6	3	6
Q	(China) M Yuan	4	2
2	(Belgium) K Clijsters	6	6

Third round
15	(Italy) F Schiavone	6	6
(Spain) M Sánchez Lorenzo	0	0
(Italy) R Vinci	1	2
2	(Belgium) K Clijsters	6	6

Fourth round
15	(Italy) F Schiavone	6^{5}	4
2	(Belgium) K Clijsters	7^{7}	6

== Championship match statistics ==
Category	(France) Mauresmo	(Belgium) Henin-Hardenne
1st serve %	23/37 (62%)	8/25 (32%)
1st serve points won	15 of 23 = 65%	2 of 8 = 25%
2nd serve points won	9 of 14 = 64%	7 of 17 = 41%
Total service points won	24 of 37 = 64.86%	9 of 25 = 36.00%
Aces	0	0
Double faults	0	1
Winners	15	2
Unforced errors	11	20
Net points won	5 of 10 = 50%	6 of 8 = 75%
Break points converted	3 of 5 = 60%	0 of 1 = 0%
Return points won	16 of 25 = 64%	13 of 37 = 35%
Total points won	40	22

Preceded by 2005 US Open – Women's singles	Grand Slam women's singles	Succeeded by 2006 French Open – Women's singles
