= 2004 Wimbledon Championships – Women's singles =

Women's singles
- 2004 Wimbledon Championships

Final
- Champion: (Russia) Maria Sharapova
- Runner-up: (United States) Serena Williams
- Score: 6–1, 6–4

Details
- Draw: 128 (12 Q / 8 WC )
- Seeds: 32

Events
Singles	men	women		boys	girls
Doubles	men	women	mixed	boys	girls
WC Singles	men	women	quad
WC Doubles	men	women	quad
Legends	men	women	seniors
← 2003 ·	Wimbledon Championships	· 2005 →

Maria Sharapova defeated two-time defending champion Serena Williams in the final, 6–1, 6–4 to win the ladies' singles tennis title at the 2004 Wimbledon Championships. It was her first major title. The 17-year-old's victory over the six-time major champion was described by commentators as "the most stunning upset in memory". With the win, Sharapova entered the top 10 in the WTA rankings for the first time. She was the third-youngest woman to win Wimbledon (behind Lottie Dod and Martina Hingis) and the second Russian woman to win a major (after Anastasia Myskina won that year's French Open).

Serena Williams was attempting to become the first woman to win the title three consecutive times since Steffi Graf in 1991, 1992 and 1993.

This was the last major singles tournament for former world No. 1 Martina Navratilova. Awarded a wild card, she won her first-round match and became, at age 47, the oldest player in the Open Era to win a main draw match at Wimbledon and the second-lowest ranked player to do so (world No. 1,001, behind Barbara Schwartz who was unranked in 2001).

== Seeds ==
1. (United States) Serena Williams (final)
2. (Russia) Anastasia Myskina (third round)
3. (United States) Venus Williams (second round)
4. (France) Amélie Mauresmo (semifinals)
5. (United States) Lindsay Davenport (semifinals)
6. (Russia) Elena Dementieva (first round)
7. (United States) Jennifer Capriati (quarterfinals)
8. (Russia) Svetlana Kuznetsova (first round)
9. (Argentina) Paola Suárez (quarterfinals)
10. (Russia) Nadia Petrova (fourth round)
11. (Japan) Ai Sugiyama (quarterfinals)
12. (Russia) Vera Zvonareva (fourth round)
13. (Russia) Maria Sharapova (champion)
14. (Italy) Silvia Farina Elia (fourth round)
15. (Switzerland) Patty Schnyder (second round)
16. (Israel) Anna Smashnova-Pistolesi (first round)

17. (United States) Chanda Rubin (first round)
18. (Italy) Francesca Schiavone (second round)
19. (Colombia) Fabiola Zuluaga (first round)
20. (Russia) Elena Bovina (second round)
21. (Bulgaria) Magdalena Maleeva (fourth round)
22. (Spain) Conchita Martínez (first round)
23. (Serbia and Montenegro) Jelena Dokić (first round)
24. (France) Mary Pierce (first round)
25. (France) Nathalie Dechy (third round)
26. (United States) Lisa Raymond (second round)
27. (Australia) Alicia Molik (third round)
28. (France) Émilie Loit (first round)
29. (Russia) Dinara Safina (first round)
30. (Greece) Eleni Daniilidou (first round)
31. (United States) Amy Frazier (fourth round)
32. (United States) Meghann Shaughnessy (third round)

Click on the seed number of a player to go to their draw section.

Note: Patty Schnyder, who would have been placed in the entry list on the initial entry cutoff date of 10 May 2004, did not enter and was later awarded a wildcard at this tournament.

== Draw ==
=== Key ===
- Q = Qualifier
- WC = Wild card
- LL = Lucky loser
- Alt = Alternate
- ITF = ITF entry
- PR = Protected ranking
- SR = Special ranking
- SE = Special exempt
- JE = Junior exempt
- JR = Junior Accelerator Programme entrant
- CO = College Accelerator Programme entrant
- NG = Next Gen Accelerator Program entrant
- w/o = Walkover
- r = Retired
- d = Defaulted

=== Finals ===
Quarterfinals
1	(United States) Serena Williams	6	6
7	(United States) Jennifer Capriati	1	1
4	(France) Amélie Mauresmo	6	5	6
9	(Argentina) Paola Suárez	0	7	1
5	(United States) Lindsay Davenport	6	6
(Croatia) Karolina Šprem	2	2
11	(Japan) Ai Sugiyama	7	5	1
13	(Russia) Maria Sharapova	5	7	6

Semifinals
1	(United States) Serena Williams	6^{4}	7	6
4	(France) Amélie Mauresmo	7^{7}	5	4
5	(United States) Lindsay Davenport	6	6^{5}	1
13	(Russia) Maria Sharapova	2	7^{7}	6

Final
1	(United States) Serena Williams	1	4
13	(Russia) Maria Sharapova	6	6

=== Top half ===
==== Section 1 ====
First round
1	(United States) S Williams	6	6
(China) J Zheng	3	1
Q	(France) S Foretz	6	6
(France) S Cohen-Aloro	1	3
(United States) L Lee-Waters	6	3	3
WC	(United Kingdom) J O'Donoghue	2	6	6
(Spain) M Serna	6	6
30	(Greece) E Daniilidou	4	2
18	(Italy) F Schiavone	3	7^{7}	6
(Switzerland) M Casanova	6	6^{4}	3
(France) T Golovin	6	7^{7}
(Russia) A Jidkova	4	6^{4}
(Switzerland) E Gagliardi	3
(United States) T Snyder	3^{r}
(Japan) A Morigami	4	1
15/WC	(Switzerland) P Schnyder	6	6

Second round
1	(United States) S Williams	6	6
Q	(France) S Foretz	0	4
WC	(United Kingdom) J O'Donoghue	3	3
(Spain) M Serna	6	6
18	(Italy) F Schiavone	1	0
(France) T Golovin	6	6
(Switzerland) E Gagliardi	2	7^{7}	6
15/WC	(Switzerland) P Schnyder	6	6^{4}	2

Third round
1	(United States) S Williams	6	6
(Spain) M Serna	4	0
(France) T Golovin	6	2	6
(Switzerland) E Gagliardi	3	6	3

Fourth round
1	(United States) S Williams	6	6
(France) T Golovin	2	1

==== Section 2 ====
First round
10	(Russia) N Petrova	6	2	6
(Italy) F Pennetta	3	6	4
(Slovakia) M Suchá	1	0
(Venezuela) M Vento-Kabchi	6	6
(Ukraine) T Perebiynis	6	6
Q	(Australia) C Wheeler	3	2
(Venezuela) M Sequera	6	7^{8}
22	(Spain) C Martínez	4	6^{6}
25	(France) N Dechy	6	6
(Spain) A Medina Garrigues	3	4
(Spain) M Sánchez Lorenzo	6	6
WC	(United Kingdom) K O'Brien	4	4
(Spain) M Marrero	1	3
WC	(United Kingdom) E Baltacha	6	6
(Luxembourg) C Schaul	2	2
7	(United States) J Capriati	6	6

Second round
10	(Russia) N Petrova	6	3	6
(Venezuela) M Vento-Kabchi	3	6	2
(Ukraine) T Perebiynis	6	7
(Venezuela) M Sequera	2	5
25	(France) N Dechy	6	6
(Spain) M Sánchez Lorenzo	1	1
WC	(United Kingdom) E Baltacha	4	4
7	(United States) J Capriati	6	6

Third round
10	(Russia) N Petrova	7^{7}	6
(Ukraine) T Perebiynis	6^{5}	2
25	(France) N Dechy	5	1
7	(United States) J Capriati	7	6

Fourth round
10	(Russia) N Petrova	4	4
7	(United States) J Capriati	6	6

==== Section 3 ====
First round
4	(France) A Mauresmo	6	6
(Croatia) J Kostanić	2	3
(Ukraine) J Vakulenko	6^{5}	2
Q	(United States) J Hopkins	7^{7}	6
(Austria) B Schett	6	4	4
(Slovakia) Ľ Cervanová	3	6	6
(Japan) S Asagoe	3	6^{4}
26	(United States) L Raymond	6	7^{7}
24	(France) M Pierce	2	5
(Spain) V Ruano Pascual	6	7
(Russia) L Krasnoroutskaya	6	4	3
(Slovakia) H Nagyová	3	6	6
(Czech Republic) B Strýcová	3	4
(Croatia) S Talaja	6	6
(China) S Peng	0	4
14	(Italy) S Farina Elia	6	6

Second round
4	(France) A Mauresmo	6	6
Q	(United States) J Hopkins	3	3
(Slovakia) Ľ Cervanová	6	6
26	(United States) L Raymond	4	3
(Spain) V Ruano Pascual	6	6
(Slovakia) H Nagyová	4	4
(Croatia) S Talaja	3	3
14	(Italy) S Farina Elia	6	6

Third round
4	(France) A Mauresmo	6	6
(Slovakia) Ľ Cervanová	1	4
(Spain) V Ruano Pascual	6	4	5
14	(Italy) S Farina Elia	2	6	7

Fourth round
4	(France) A Mauresmo	7	6
14	(Italy) S Farina Elia	5	3

==== Section 4 ====
First round
9	(Argentina) P Suárez	6	6
(United States) S Perry	2	4
(United States) A Harkleroad	3	7	4
(Belgium) E Callens	6	5	6
Q	(China) T Sun	2	6	6
(Italy) T Garbin	6	0	2
PR	(Luxembourg) A Kremer	6	6
19	(Colombia) F Zuluaga	4	3
29	(Russia) D Safina	0	0^{r}
(Spain) A Parra Santonja	6	2
(Italy) R Grande	7	7
(Italy) M Santangelo	5	5
(Spain) G León García	2	2
(Russia) E Likhovtseva	6	6
Q	(France) V Razzano	7^{7}	3	6
8	(Russia) S Kuznetsova	6^{4}	6	4

Second round
9	(Argentina) P Suárez	6	6
(Belgium) E Callens	2	2
Q	(China) T Sun	3	5
PR	(Luxembourg) A Kremer	6	7
(Spain) A Parra Santonja	7	2	3
(Italy) R Grande	5	6	6
(Russia) E Likhovtseva	1	2
Q	(France) V Razzano	6	6

Third round
9	(Argentina) P Suárez	6	4	6
PR	(Luxembourg) A Kremer	1	6	0
(Italy) R Grande	6	4	6
Q	(France) V Razzano	4	6	3

Fourth round
9	(Argentina) P Suárez	4	6	6
(Italy) R Grande	6	0	2

=== Bottom half ===
==== Section 5 ====
First round
5	(United States) L Davenport	6	6
(Madagascar) D Randriantefy	2	1
(Puerto Rico) K Brandi	6	6
(Czech Republic) I Benešová	2	0
Q	(Indonesia) A Widjaja	2	1
Q	(United States) M Washington	6	6
Q	(Russia) T Panova	6	6
28	(France) É Loit	1	2
23	(Serbia and Montenegro) J Dokić	3	3
(Argentina) G Dulko	6	6
(Colombia) C Castaño	0	1
WC	(United States) M Navratilova	6	6
(Japan) S Obata	4	6	7
Q	(Czech Republic) E Birnerová	6	4	5
(Australia) S Stosur	4	4
12	(Russia) V Zvonareva	6	6

Second round
5	(United States) L Davenport	6	1
(Puerto Rico) K Brandi	0	0^{r}
Q	(United States) M Washington	3	4
Q	(Russia) T Panova	6	6
(Argentina) G Dulko	3	6	6
WC	(United States) M Navratilova	6	3	3
(Japan) S Obata	1	4
12	(Russia) V Zvonareva	6	6

Third round
5	(United States) L Davenport	6	6
Q	(Russia) T Panova	2	1
(Argentina) G Dulko	4	2
12	(Russia) V Zvonareva	6	6

Fourth round
5	(United States) L Davenport	6	6
12	(Russia) V Zvonareva	4	4

==== Section 6 ====
First round
16	(Israel) A Smashnova-Pistolesi	4	3
(Slovenia) K Srebotnik	6	6
(Germany) M Weingärtner	3	1
(Czech Republic) D Chládková	6	6
(United States) J Craybas	6	6
(Zimbabwe) C Black	4	3
(Russia) V Dushevina	1	5
21	(Bulgaria) M Maleeva	6	7
32	(United States) M Shaughnessy	7^{7}	7^{7}
(United States) M Irvin	6^{3}	6^{0}
(Hungary) P Mandula	3	3
Q	(Spain) N Llagostera Vives	6	6
(Croatia) K Šprem	2	6	6
(United States) L Granville	6	1	4
(Switzerland) M-G Mikaelian	3	0
3	(United States) V Williams	6	6

Second round
(Slovenia) K Srebotnik	6^{5}	0
(Czech Republic) D Chládková	7^{7}	6
(United States) J Craybas	2	3
21	(Bulgaria) M Maleeva	6	6
32	(United States) M Shaughnessy	6	4	10
Q	(Spain) N Llagostera Vives	4	6	8
(Croatia) K Šprem	7^{7}	7^{8}
3	(United States) V Williams	6^{5}	6^{6}

Third round
(Czech Republic) D Chládková	5	3
21	(Bulgaria) M Maleeva	7	6
32	(United States) M Shaughnessy	6^{5}	6^{2}
(Croatia) K Šprem	7^{7}	7^{7}

Fourth round
21	(Bulgaria) M Maleeva	4	4
(Croatia) K Šprem	6	6

==== Section 7 ====
First round
6	(Russia) E Dementieva	4	6	4
(Czech Republic) S Kleinová	6	1	6
(Germany) A-L Grönefeld	2	0
(Thailand) T Tanasugarn	6	6
(Slovenia) T Pisnik	6	1	5
(United States) T Ashley	2	6	7
(Hungary) M Czink	1	4
27	(Australia) A Molik	6	6
17	(United States) C Rubin	6^{5}	3
(France) M Bartoli	7^{7}	6
(Italy) ME Camerin	7	6
(Germany) A Barna	5	2
(Serbia and Montenegro) J Janković	6	1	4
(Czech Republic) K Koukalová	3	6	6
WC	(United Kingdom) A Janes	6	2	3
11	(Japan) A Sugiyama	3	6	6

Second round
(Czech Republic) S Kleinová	3	3
(Thailand) T Tanasugarn	6	6
(United States) T Ashley	5	4
27	(Australia) A Molik	7	6
(France) M Bartoli	6	6
(Italy) ME Camerin	3	3
(Czech Republic) K Koukalová	4	4
11	(Japan) A Sugiyama	6	6

Third round
(Thailand) T Tanasugarn	6	6
27	(Australia) A Molik	2	4
(France) M Bartoli	1	2
11	(Japan) A Sugiyama	6	6

Fourth round
(Thailand) T Tanasugarn	3	5
11	(Japan) A Sugiyama	6	7

==== Section 8 ====
First round
13	(Russia) M Sharapova	6	6
Q	(Ukraine) Y Beygelzimer	2	1
WC	(United Kingdom) A Keothavong	6	6
(Australia) N Pratt	3	1
(Slovakia) D Hantuchová	6	6
(United States) S Reeves	1	4
Q	(Romania) E Gallovits	1	2
20	(Russia) E Bovina	6	6
31	(United States) A Frazier	6	6
(Russia) M Kirilenko	1	4
WC	(United Kingdom) E Webley-Smith	7^{7}	6
(France) S Beltrame	6^{2}	4
(Bosnia and Herzegovina) M Jugić-Salkić	4	6	3
(Hungary) A Kapros	6	2	6
(Slovakia) Ľ Kurhajcová	5	1
2	(Russia) A Myskina	7	6

Second round
13	(Russia) M Sharapova	6	6
WC	(United Kingdom) A Keothavong	4	0
(Slovakia) D Hantuchová
20	(Russia) E Bovina	w/o
31	(United States) A Frazier	6	3	8
WC	(United Kingdom) E Webley-Smith	2	6	6
(Hungary) A Kapros	7	2	4
2	(Russia) A Myskina	5	6	6

Third round
13	(Russia) M Sharapova	6	6
(Slovakia) D Hantuchová	3	1
31	(United States) A Frazier	4	6	6
2	(Russia) A Myskina	6	4	4

Fourth round
13	(Russia) M Sharapova	6	7
31	(United States) A Frazier	4	5

== Championship match statistics ==
Category	(Russia) Sharapova	(United States) S. Williams
1st serve %	39/64 (61%)	33/54 (61%)
1st serve points won	25 of 39 = 64%	20 of 33 = 61%
2nd serve points won	15 of 25 = 60%	9 of 21 = 43%
Total service points won	40 of 64 = 62.50%	29 of 54 = 53.70%
Aces	2	3
Double faults	4	1
Winners	25	20
Unforced errors	11	10
Net points won	4 of 4 = 100%	3 of 9 = 33%
Break points converted	4 of 10 = 40%	1 of 6 = 17%
Return points won	25 of 54 = 46%	24 of 64 = 38%
Total points won	65	53

Preceded by 2004 French Open – Women's singles	Grand Slam women's singles	Succeeded by 2004 US Open – Women's singles
