= 2006 Wimbledon Championships – Women's singles =

Women's singles
- 2006 Wimbledon Championships

Final
- Champion: (France) Amélie Mauresmo
- Runner-up: (Belgium) Justine Henin-Hardenne
- Score: 2–6, 6–3, 6–4

Details
- Draw: 128 (12 Q / 8 WC )
- Seeds: 32

Events
Singles	men	women		boys	girls
Doubles	men	women	mixed	boys	girls
WC Singles	men	women	quad
WC Doubles	men	women	quad
Legends	men	women	seniors
← 2005 ·	Wimbledon Championships	· 2007 →

Amélie Mauresmo defeated Justine Henin-Hardenne in the final, 2–6, 6–3, 6–4 to win the ladies' singles tennis title at the 2006 Wimbledon Championships. It was her second and last major title, having won the Australian Open earlier in the year. Mauresmo was the first Frenchwoman to win Wimbledon since Suzanne Lenglen in 1925. Henin-Hardenne was attempting to complete the career Grand Slam.

Venus Williams was the defending champion, but lost in the third round to Jelena Janković.

With Serena Williams not competing due to a knee injury, this marked the only edition of Wimbledon between 1999 and 2011 not to feature either of the Williams sisters in the final.

Li Na was the first Chinese player (male or female) to reach a major singles quarterfinal.

== Seeds ==
1. (France) Amélie Mauresmo (champion)
2. (Belgium) Kim Clijsters (semifinals)
3. (Belgium) Justine Henin-Hardenne (final)
4. (Russia) Maria Sharapova (semifinals)
5. (Russia) Svetlana Kuznetsova (third round)
6. (United States) Venus Williams (third round)
7. (Russia) Elena Dementieva (quarterfinals)
8. (Switzerland) Patty Schnyder (second round)
9. (Russia) Anastasia Myskina (quarterfinals)
10. (Czech Republic) Nicole Vaidišová (fourth round)
11. (Italy) Francesca Schiavone (first round)
12. (Switzerland) Martina Hingis (third round)
13. (Germany) Anna-Lena Grönefeld (first round)
14. (Russia) Dinara Safina (third round)
15. (Slovakia) Daniela Hantuchová (fourth round)
16. (Italy) Flavia Pennetta (fourth round)

17. (Russia) Maria Kirilenko (first round)
18. (Japan) Ai Sugiyama (fourth round)
19. (Serbia) Ana Ivanovic (fourth round)
20. (Israel) Shahar Pe'er (second round)
21. (Slovenia) Katarina Srebotnik (third round)
22. (France) Nathalie Dechy (first round)
23. (Spain) Anabel Medina Garrigues (third round)
24. (France) Marion Bartoli (second round)
25. (Russia) Elena Likhovtseva (third round)
26. (Serbia) Jelena Janković (fourth round)
27. (China) Li Na (quarterfinals)
28. (Sweden) Sofia Arvidsson (first round)
29. (France) Tatiana Golovin (second round)
30. (Russia) Anna Chakvetadze (third round)
31. (Argentina) Gisela Dulko (third round)
32. (Italy) Mara Santangelo (first round)

Click on the seed number of a player to go to their draw section.

== Draw ==
=== Key ===
- Q = Qualifier
- WC = Wild card
- LL = Lucky loser
- Alt = Alternate
- ITF = ITF entry
- PR = Protected ranking
- SR = Special ranking
- SE = Special exempt
- JE = Junior exempt
- JR = Junior Accelerator Programme entrant
- CO = College Accelerator Programme entrant
- NG = Next Gen Accelerator Program entrant
- w/o = Walkover
- r = Retired
- d = Defaulted

=== Finals ===
Quarterfinals
1	(France) Amélie Mauresmo	6	3	6
9	(Russia) Anastasia Myskina	1	6	3
4	(Russia) Maria Sharapova	6	6
7	(Russia) Elena Dementieva	1	4
Q	(France) Séverine Brémond	4	4
3	(Belgium) Justine Henin-Hardenne	6	6
27	(China) Li Na	4	5
2	(Belgium) Kim Clijsters	6	7

Semifinals
1	(France) Amélie Mauresmo	6	3	6
4	(Russia) Maria Sharapova	3	6	2
3	(Belgium) Justine Henin-Hardenne	6	7^{7}
2	(Belgium) Kim Clijsters	4	6^{4}

Final
1	(France) Amélie Mauresmo	2	6	6
3	(Belgium) Justine Henin-Hardenne	6	3	4

=== Top half ===
==== Section 1 ====
First round
1	(France) A Mauresmo	6	6
Q	(Croatia) I Abramović	0	0
(Netherlands) M Krajicek	5	3
(Australia) S Stosur	7	6
(Slovakia) J Gajdošová	2	3
Q	(Australia) N Pratt	6	6
(Argentina) M Díaz Oliva	6	2	7
29	(France) T Golovin	3	6	9
19	(Serbia) A Ivanovic	7	7^{7}
(Switzerland) E Gagliardi	5	6^{4}
(Poland) M Domachowska	3	7^{7}	4
WC	(United Kingdom) S Borwell	6	6^{3}	6
(United States) M Washington	6	6
(Germany) J Schruff	3	4
(United States) J Craybas	6	5	5
14	(Russia) D Safina	3	7	7

Second round
1	(France) A Mauresmo	6	6
(Australia) S Stosur	4	2
Q	(Australia) N Pratt	2	6	6
29	(France) T Golovin	6	4	4
19	(Serbia) A Ivanovic	6	6
WC	(United Kingdom) S Borwell	1	2
(United States) M Washington	6	4	1
14	(Russia) D Safina	4	6	6

Third round
1	(France) A Mauresmo	6	6
Q	(Australia) N Pratt	1	2
19	(Serbia) A Ivanovic	3	7^{7}	6
14	(Russia) D Safina	6	6^{3}	1

Fourth round
1	(France) A Mauresmo	6	6
19	(Serbia) A Ivanovic	3	4

==== Section 2 ====
First round
9	(Russia) A Myskina	6	6
WC	(Zimbabwe) C Black	0	4
(Germany) M Müller	6	6
(Estonia) K Kanepi	4	4
Q	(Argentina) C Fernández	6	4	4
(Spain) C Martínez Granados	2	6	3^{r}
(Chinese Taipei) S-w Hsieh	3	2
23	(Spain) A Medina Garrigues	6	6
26	(Serbia) J Janković	6	6
(Spain) L Domínguez Lino	3	4
LL	(Ukraine) J Vakulenko	4^{r}
(United States) V King	5
(United States) L Raymond	3
Q	(Russia) Y Shvedova	5^{r}
(United States) B Mattek	1	0
6	(United States) V Williams	6	6

Second round
9	(Russia) A Myskina	6	6
(Germany) M Müller	2	1
Q	(Argentina) C Fernández	7^{9}	5	9
23	(Spain) A Medina Garrigues	6^{7}	7	11
26	(Serbia) J Janković	6	4	6
(United States) V King	2	6	4
(United States) L Raymond	7^{7}	5	2
6	(United States) V Williams	6^{4}	7	6

Third round
9	(Russia) A Myskina	6	6
23	(Spain) A Medina Garrigues	3	4
26	(Serbia) J Janković	7^{10}	4	6
6	(United States) V Williams	6^{8}	6	4

Fourth round
9	(Russia) A Myskina	6	7^{7}
26	(Serbia) J Janković	4	6^{5}

==== Section 3 ====
First round
4	(Russia) M Sharapova	6	6
(Israel) A Smashnova	2	0
(United States) A Harkleroad	6	6
(Croatia) J Kostanić	3	2
(Spain) L Pous Tió	3	1
(Hungary) M Czink	6	6
(United States) A Frazier	3	6	6
32	(Italy) M Santangelo	6	3	4
20	(Israel) S Pe'er	6	6
(Ukraine) Y Fedak	2	1
(Greece) E Daniilidou	4	4
(China) S Peng	6	6
(Estonia) M Ani	1	6^{3}
(United States) L Granville	6	7^{7}
(Germany) S Klösel	7	4	2
16	(Italy) F Pennetta	5	6	6

Second round
4	(Russia) M Sharapova	6	6
(United States) A Harkleroad	2	2
(Hungary) M Czink	2	3
(United States) A Frazier	6	6
20	(Israel) S Pe'er	4	6^{5}
(China) S Peng	6	7^{7}
(United States) L Granville	2	1
16	(Italy) F Pennetta	6	6

Third round
4	(Russia) M Sharapova	6	6
(United States) A Frazier	3	2
(China) S Peng	2	3
16	(Italy) F Pennetta	6	6

Fourth round
4	(Russia) M Sharapova	7^{7}	3	6
16	(Italy) F Pennetta	6^{5}	6	3

==== Section 4 ====
First round
11	(Italy) F Schiavone	6	3	4
WC	(United Kingdom) M South	3	6	6
(United States) S Perry	7	5	8
Q	(Germany) K Barrois	5	7	6
(Russia) A Rodionova	1	7^{7}	6
(France) É Loit	6	6^{5}	4
(Austria) S Bammer	7	7
22	(France) N Dechy	5	5
25	(Russia) E Likhovtseva	6	6
(France) S Foretz	0	2
(China) T Sun	6	6
(Italy) N Viérin	3	4
(United States) M Shaughnessy	4	6	6
(Ukraine) A Bondarenko	6	2	3
(India) S Mirza	6^{5}	5
7	(Russia) E Dementieva	7^{7}	7

Second round
WC	(United Kingdom) M South	6^{5}	2
(United States) S Perry	7^{7}	6
(Russia) A Rodionova	4	4
(Austria) S Bammer	6	6
25	(Russia) E Likhovtseva	6	6
(China) T Sun	3	3
(United States) M Shaughnessy	7	3	5
7	(Russia) E Dementieva	5	6	7

Third round
(United States) S Perry	7	6
(Austria) S Bammer	5	3
25	(Russia) E Likhovtseva	5	3
7	(Russia) E Dementieva	7	6

Fourth round
(United States) S Perry	2	0
7	(Russia) E Dementieva	6	6

=== Bottom half ===
==== Section 5 ====
First round
8	(Switzerland) P Schnyder	2	7^{7}	6
(Italy) A Serra Zanetti	6	6^{4}	2
(Belarus) A Yakimova	5	3
Q	(France) S Brémond	7	6
(Czech Republic) H Šromová	4	3
(Spain) V Ruano Pascual	6	6
(Finland) E Laine	6^{11}	1
31	(Argentina) G Dulko	7^{13}	6
18	(Japan) A Sugiyama	6	7
WC	(United Kingdom) N Cavaday	4	5
(Russia) V Dushevina	6	4	2
(Japan) A Morigami	1	6	6
(Italy) T Garbin	2	7^{7}	6
WC	(United Kingdom) K O'Brien	6	6^{2}	2
(Ukraine) O Savchuk	2	2
12	(Switzerland) M Hingis	6	6

Second round
8	(Switzerland) P Schnyder	6	1	4
Q	(France) S Brémond	4	6	6
(Spain) V Ruano Pascual	5	4
31	(Argentina) G Dulko	7	6
18	(Japan) A Sugiyama	6	7
(Japan) A Morigami	2	5
(Italy) T Garbin	1	2
12	(Switzerland) M Hingis	6	6

Third round
Q	(France) S Brémond	7^{8}	5	7
31	(Argentina) G Dulko	6^{6}	7	5
18	(Japan) A Sugiyama	7	3	6
12	(Switzerland) M Hingis	5	6	4

Fourth round
Q	(France) S Brémond	7^{13}	6
18	(Japan) A Sugiyama	6^{11}	3

==== Section 6 ====
First round
15	(Slovakia) D Hantuchová	6	4	6
(Italy) ME Camerin	4	6	1
Q	(Belgium) K Flipkens	6	4	1
(United States) J Jackson	4	6	6
WC	(Australia) A Molik	7	6
Q	(Chinese Taipei) Y-j Chan	5	1
(Slovakia) M Suchá	4	1
21	(Slovenia) K Srebotnik	6	6
30	(Russia) A Chakvetadze	6	6
(China) Z Yan	3	2
(Spain) M Sánchez Lorenzo	6	4	3
(Russia) E Vesnina	2	6	6
(Japan) A Nakamura	3	6	3
(Russia) E Bychkova	6	1	6
(China) M Yuan	0	1
3	(Belgium) J Henin	6	6

Second round
15	(Slovakia) D Hantuchová	6	4	7
(United States) J Jackson	3	6	5
WC	(Australia) A Molik	2	1
21	(Slovenia) K Srebotnik	6	6
30	(Russia) A Chakvetadze	6	3	6
(Russia) E Vesnina	4	6	3
(Russia) E Bychkova	1	2
3	(Belgium) J Henin	6	6

Third round
15	(Slovakia) D Hantuchová	6	7^{7}
21	(Slovenia) K Srebotnik	4	6^{2}
30	(Russia) A Chakvetadze	2	3
3	(Belgium) J Henin	6	6

Fourth round
15	(Slovakia) D Hantuchová	3	1
3	(Belgium) J Henin	6	6

==== Section 7 ====
First round
5	(Russia) S Kuznetsova	6	6
Q	(Italy) R Oprandi	3	2
(Czech Republic) K Peschke	6	6
(Puerto Rico) K Brandi	3	0
Q	(United States) M Tu	6	6
Q	(Russia) V Bardina	3	0
(France) V Razzano	2	0
27	(China) N Li	6	6
24	(France) M Bartoli	6	6
(France) C Pin	0	2
(Croatia) K Šprem	6	6
WC	(United Kingdom) A Keothavong	0	2
(Croatia) I Lisjak	4	5
(Ukraine) K Bondarenko	6	7
(Czech Republic) K Koukalová	5	5
10	(Czech Republic) N Vaidišová	7	7

Second round
5	(Russia) S Kuznetsova	4	6	6
(Czech Republic) K Peschke	6	1	4
Q	(United States) M Tu	2	4
27	(China) N Li	6	6
24	(France) M Bartoli	6	2	3
(Croatia) K Šprem	3	6	6
(Ukraine) K Bondarenko	1	1
10	(Czech Republic) N Vaidišová	6	6

Third round
5	(Russia) S Kuznetsova	6	2	3
27	(China) N Li	3	6	6
(Croatia) K Šprem	5	5
10	(Czech Republic) N Vaidišová	7	7

Fourth round
27	(China) N Li	4	6	6
10	(Czech Republic) N Vaidišová	6	1	3

==== Section 8 ====
First round
13	(Germany) A-L Grönefeld	6	3	1
(Bulgaria) T Pironkova	3	6	6
WC	(Poland) A Radwańska	7	6
(Belarus) V Azarenka	5	4
(Colombia) C Castaño	7^{7}	1	2
Q	(Thailand) T Tanasugarn	6^{2}	6	6
(Japan) S Asagoe	6	7^{7}
17	(Russia) M Kirilenko	2	6^{1}
28	(Sweden) S Arvidsson	2	4
(Czech Republic) E Birnerová	6	6
(China) J Zheng	7	6
(Czech Republic) I Benešová	5	2
(Ukraine) V Kutuzova	6	3
(United States) L Osterloh	4	3^{r}
(Russia) V Zvonareva	5	3
2	(Belgium) K Clijsters	7	6

Second round
(Bulgaria) T Pironkova	5	6^{5}
WC	(Poland) A Radwańska	7	7^{7}
Q	(Thailand) T Tanasugarn	6	7
(Japan) S Asagoe	3	5
(Czech Republic) E Birnerová	6^{6}	7	3
(China) J Zheng	7^{8}	5	6
(Ukraine) V Kutuzova	w/o
2	(Belgium) K Clijsters

Third round
WC	(Poland) A Radwańska	6	6
Q	(Thailand) T Tanasugarn	3	2
(China) J Zheng	3	2
2	(Belgium) K Clijsters	6	6

Fourth round
WC	(Poland) A Radwańska	2	2
2	(Belgium) K Clijsters	6	6

== Championship match statistics ==
Category	(France) Mauresmo	(Belgium) Henin-Hardenne
1st serve %	54/89 (61%)	53/91 (58%)
1st serve points won	36 of 54 = 67%	33 of 53 = 62%
2nd serve points won	20 of 35 = 57%	22 of 38 = 58%
Total service points won	56 of 89 = 62.92%	55 of 91 = 60.44%
Aces	8	1
Double faults	1	2
Winners	20	31
Unforced errors	27	26
Net points won	30 of 51 = 59%	32 of 52 = 62%
Break points converted	3 of 9 = 33%	3 of 9 = 33%
Return points won	36 of 91 = 40%	33 of 89 = 37%
Total points won	92	88

Preceded by 2006 French Open – Women's singles	Grand Slam women's singles	Succeeded by 2006 US Open – Women's singles
