= Anastasia Myskina =

Russian tennis player

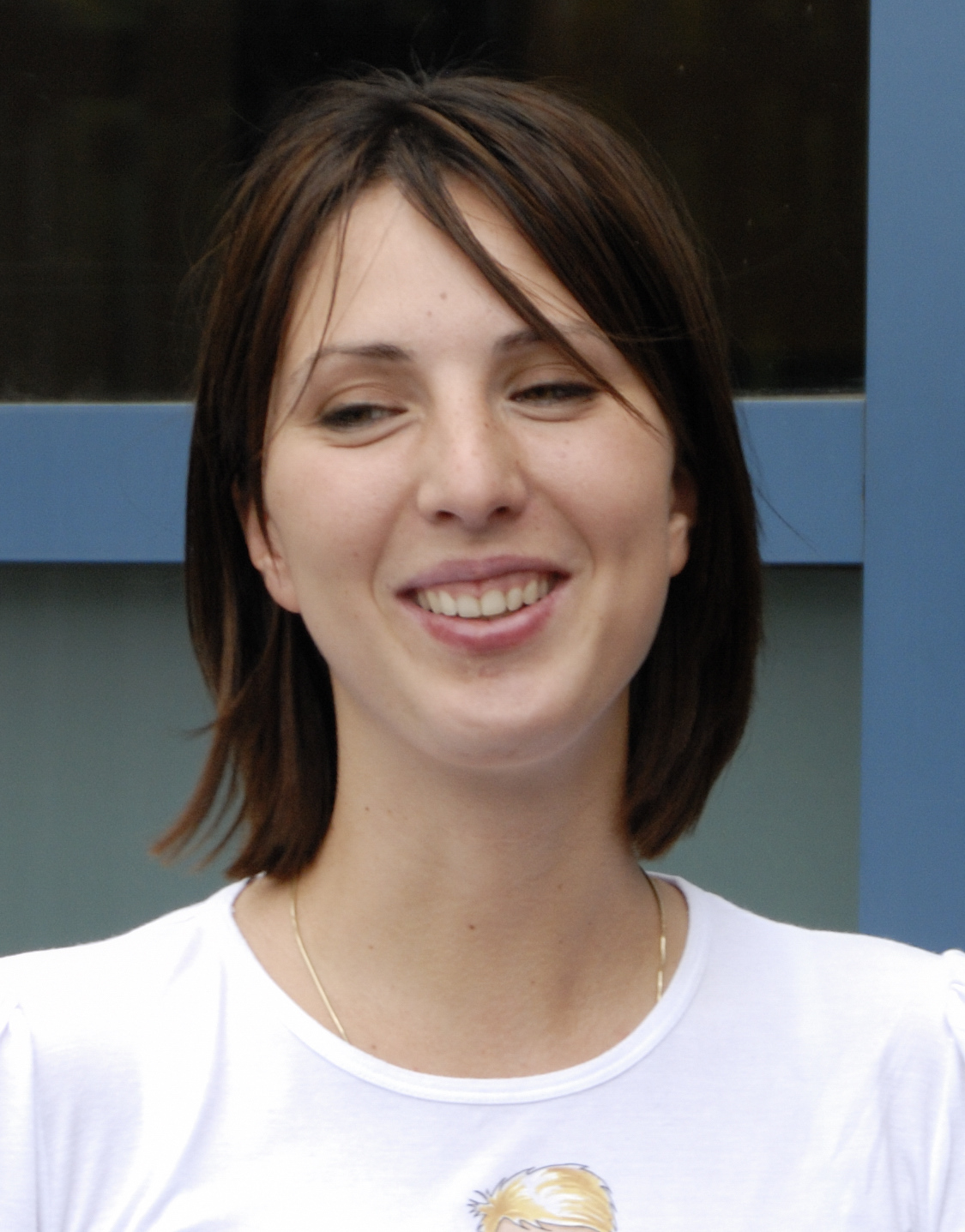
- Native name: Анастасия Мыскина
- Country (sports): Russia
- Born: 8 July 1981 (age 45) Moscow, Russian SFSR, Soviet Union
- Height: 1.74 m (5 ft 9 in)
- Turned pro: 1998
- Retired: (last match 2007)
- Plays: Right-handed (two-handed backhand)
- Prize money: $5,606,725

Singles
- Career record: 355–191
- Career titles: 10
- Highest ranking: No. 2 (13 September 2004)

Grand Slam singles results
- Australian Open: QF (2003, 2004)
- French Open: W (2004)
- Wimbledon: QF (2005, 2006)
- US Open: QF (2003)

Other tournaments
- Tour Finals: SF (2004)
- Olympic Games: SF – 4th (2004)

Doubles
- Career record: 100–92
- Career titles: 5
- Highest ranking: No. 15 (21 February 2005)

Grand Slam doubles results
- Australian Open: SF (2005)
- French Open: 3R (2004, 2006)
- Wimbledon: 3R (2006)
- US Open: 1R (2003, 2005)

Other doubles tournaments
- Olympic Games: 2R (2000)

Team competitions
- Fed Cup: W (2004, 2005); Record 18–6

Anastasia Andreyevna Myskina (Russian: Анастасия Андреевна Мыскина; born 8 July 1981) is a Russian former professional tennis player. Myskina won the 2004 French Open singles title, becoming the first Russian woman to win a major singles title. Due to this victory, she rose to No. 3 in the Women's Tennis Association (WTA) rankings, becoming the first Russian woman to reach the top 3 in the history of the rankings. In September 2004, she reached a career-high ranking of No. 2.

== Tennis career ==
=== 1999–2001 ===
Myskina was born in Moscow and turned professional in 1998, the year in which she broke into the WTA top 500. She won her first WTA title in Palermo in only her second appearance in the main draw of a WTA Tour tournament. She made her debut in a Grand Slam tournament at the US Open and the Fed Cup (playing doubles). In 2000, Myskina scored first career top-20 victory over No. 17 Barbara Schett en route to the Sopot semifinal. She debuted at Roland Garros (which she would later win) and Wimbledon. She played in the Sydney Olympics and reached her first Tier I quarterfinal in Zürich, where she lost to world No. 1 Martina Hingis. Myskina was plagued by injury that forced her to miss the Australian Open. As a result, she fell out of the top 100. She then had a solid indoor performance, reaching the quarterfinals in Leipzig and the semifinals in Moscow, her first career Tier I semifinal.

=== 2002 ===
2002 was a breakthrough season for Myskina. She scored her first top-10 win over defending champion Jelena Dokić in Rome, and entered to the top 20. Myskina reached back-to-back grass-court finals in Birmingham and Eastbourne, and rose to No. 15 in the rankings. She won her first Tier II Brasil Open title in Salvador, Bahia, and another runner-up finish in Leipzig confirmed her spot in WTA Tour Championships. She finished the 2002 season in the top 15 for the first time in her career.

=== 2003 ===
Myskina obtained an invite to play the Hong Kong Ladies Challenge and reached the Australian Open quarterfinals (her first Grand Slam quarterfinal appearance of six). After claiming the title in Doha and defeating friend Elena Likhovtseva in the first all-Russian final in WTA history, she cracked the top 10. Established her place among the game elite with a win in Sarasota, Myskina also had mediocre results during the summer season were followed by a quarterfinal appearance at the US Open, back-to-back titles in Leipzig (defeating No. 1 Kim Clijsters and No. 2 Justine Henin) and Moscow, which was her first Tier I title. She became the first Russian woman to win the Kremlin Cup), and she made the finals in Philadelphia. Myskina qualified for the Tour Championships. She earned more than US$ one million in prize money, and finished the year in the top 10 for the first time in her career.

=== 2004: French Open champion ===
2004 was Myskina's best season. Myskina successfully defended her Doha title, afterwards becoming the second Russian woman to break into the top 5, the first was Natasha Zvereva, who rose to No. 5 in the world in May 1989. The highlight of Myskina's 2004 season was a victory at the French Open, where she saved match points in the fourth round against Svetlana Kuznetsova, then defeated former world No. 1 players Venus Williams and Jennifer Capriati, en route to a 6–1, 6–2 victory over compatriot Elena Dementieva in the first all-Russian Grand Slam final, thus making her the first female Russian to win a Grand Slam singles title. Prior to her French Open victory, she had never made it past the second round at Roland Garros. Following her win in Paris, she rose to No. 3 in the rankings. She reached the final in San Diego, breaking Maria Sharapova's 14-match winning streak that included Wimbledon and beat Vera Zvonareva 17–15 in a third set tie-break, saving nine match points, winning the longest final set tie-break in WTA Tour history. She lost in the 2004 Athens Olympics semifinal to Justine Henin, having led 5–1 in the final set. She rose to a career-high No. 2 in the rankings. Myskina recovered from the tough loss to win the Kremlin Cup for the second straight year, and beat No. 2 Lindsay Davenport for the first time in five meetings en route to doing so. She finished on the top of her group at the WTA Championships, and scored her second win over a world No. 1 by again beating Davenport, but lost in the semifinals to the eventual champion Sharapova. Myskina led Russia to its first Fed Cup title, winning eight out of nine matches played, including winning all of her three matches in the final. Finished the season as world No. 3, a career-best year-end rank for a female Russian, and won over US$2 million in prize money, having scored ten top-10-wins during the 2004 season.

=== 2005 ===
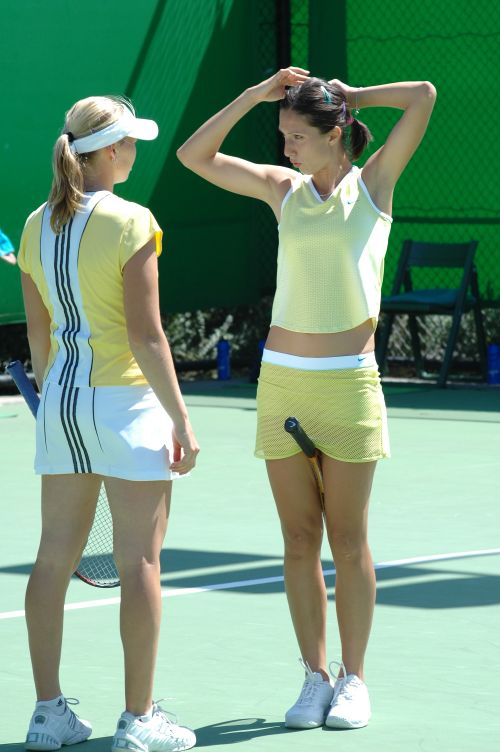
Myskina (right) with Vera Zvonareva

2005 brought Myskina mixed fortunes. She spent the first half of 2005 poorly, due to personal issues regarding her mother's health. Myskina surrendered her Doha and Roland Garros titles in the very first round, and became the first Roland Garros champion to lose in the opening round. Bringing an 8–10 win–loss record to the beginning of the grass court season, Myskina managed to turn it around at Wimbledon by reaching her career-first quarterfinal at the event with three comeback wins over Jelena Janković (from a 1–5 final set deficit), and over Dementieva (being 1–6, 0–3 down and facing match points in the second set tiebreak). She fell out of the top 10 in August. She then won her tenth career title in Kolkata beating lower-ranked opponents. She also beat the Wimbledon champion Venus Williams in Fed Cup semifinals, but then lost both of her matches in the final. Myskina finished inside top 15 for the fourth straight time.

=== 2006 ===
2006 was another disappointing season for Myskina. Having had several chances to return to the top 10, she failed to convert any of them. In Warsaw, she suffered her worst defeat in terms of the rankings on WTA Tour level, falling to a wildcard, Agnieszka Radwańska, then ranked No. 309. At Roland Garros, Myskina defeated 2005 quarterfinalist Ana Ivanovic in the third round before losing to the eventual champion Justine Henin in the fourth round.

She showed splashes of her old form during the grass season, having reached the Eastbourne final beautifully, losing to Justine Henin-Hardenne in a close final concluded in a third set tiebreak. She made the Wimbledon quarterfinals, but lost to eventual champion Amélie Mauresmo in three sets. She had solid performance at the first two majors, making the fourth round on each occasion. After Wimbledon, her game completely fell apart. Along with second straight runner-up finish at the Tier IV event in Stockholm, she did not manage to win a single match in North America, going 0–3 during the US Open Series. The downfall reached its nadir when she became the first person to lose a Grand Slam match against future world No. 1, Victoria Azarenka, at the US Open, having entered the event under an injury cloud carried over from New Haven. Anastasia sat out for a majority of the indoor season with a foot and toe injury, pulling out of Stuttgart and her home tournament in Moscow. She returned to play in Zürich, but lost to then unknown Swiss qualifier Timea Bacsinszky, 3–6, 3–6.

=== 2007: Struggles with injuries, final year ===
Myskina only played two singles matches, having been injured. She lost both of those matches; including to Meghann Shaughnessy at the French Open, only winning one game.

== Playing style ==
Myskina was a baseline player who combined excellent defensive skills with aggressive shot-making abilities. Her two-handed backhand was powerful, and was hit flat and with consistent depth, and was responsible for many of the winners she accumulated on court. Her forehand was also strong, especially when hit inside-out, and could be devastating when Myskina was in good form, but a lack of control sometimes led to a high number of unforced errors when employing this shot. Her serve was reliable, although not particularly strong, with her average first serve being delivered at 95 mph (153 km/h), meaning that she did not ace frequently, although her serve speed had been recorded as fast as 107 mph (172 km/h). Her second serve was weaker, typically being delivered at 70 mph (110 km/h), and was susceptible to attack by aggressive players. When Myskina was nervous, her second serve became less reliable, leading to a relatively high double fault count. Myskina's greatest strengths as a player were her exceptional speed and court coverage, detailed and precise footwork, anticipation, and ability to improvise as and when the situation required. She also possessed delicate touch, and was able to incorporate drop shots and lobs effectively into points, and frequently hit winners with these typically defensive shots. Due to her doubles experience, she was also an adept volleyer when she chose to approach the net. Myskina's greatest weakness was her inconsistency, which was exacerbated by her fiery temper that was described as "volcanic" by some commentators.

== Endorsements and apparel ==
Myskina was endorsed by Nike for clothing and apparel, and Head for rackets.

== Personal life ==
Myskina dated HC Dynamo Moscow hockey player Aleksandr Stepanov.

In October 2002, she had a series of photos taken for GQ magazine by the photographer Mark Seliger for a spread in the October 2002 edition of GQ, in which one approved photo of her fully clothed was published. After she won the French Open in 2004, some photographs from the shoot, in which she appeared topless, were published in the Russian magazine Medved (Bear).

In August 2004, she filed a US$8 million lawsuit against GQ for allowing her topless photographs to appear in Medved without her consent. On 19 June 2005, U.S. District Judge Michael Mukasey, later United States Attorney General, ruled Myskina could not stop the distribution of the topless photos, because she had signed a release. She had claimed that she did not understand the photo release form and that she was not fluent in English at the time.

Myskina has three sons, born in 2008, 2010, and 2012.

When she was interviewed about parenting with Tennis.com she said: "Being a mother is so different; it’s not that it’s quieter or faster, it’s just different. Being a mom is tough. You understand what’s good for you and the babies, while tennis is just a game. It’s fun because you have a different life when you step on the court but when the baby is sick you go crazy. When I lost a match it was really bad time, now I know it was a great time, so being a mom is tougher." She also made a lot of statements about tennis more benefiting girls than boys: "I think this is absolutely not a male sport. I don't want to offend any male tennis player, but ... our game is not a team game, a sport for egoists. And if women somehow cope, then men – they are so weak. I am for team sports! Friendship, mutual assistance is the best that the team can give."

== Grand Slam tournament finals ==
=== Singles: 1 (title) ===
Result	Year	Championship	Surface	Opponent	Score
Win	2004	French Open	Clay	(Russia) Elena Dementieva	6–1, 6–2

== Other significant finals ==
=== Olympic medal matches ===
==== Singles: 1 (4th place) ====
Result	Year	Tournament	Surface	Opponent	Score
4th place	2004	Athens Olympics	Hard	(Australia) Alicia Molik	3–6, 4–6

=== WTA Tier I tournaments ===
==== Singles: 3 (2 titles, 1 runner-up) ====
Result	Year	Tournament	Surface	Opponent	Score
Win	2003	Kremlin Cup, Russia	Carpet (i)	(France) Amélie Mauresmo	6–2, 6–4
Loss	2004	San Diego Open, US	Hard	(United States) Lindsay Davenport	1–6, 1–6
Win	2004	Kremlin Cup, Russia (2)	Carpet (i)	(Russia) Elena Dementieva	7–5, 6–0

==== Doubles: 2 (1 title, 1 runner-up) ====
Result	Year	Tournament	Surface	Partner	Opponents	Score
Loss	2003	Kremlin Cup, Russia	Carpet (i)	(Russia) Vera Zvonareva	(Russia) Nadia Petrova (United States) Meghann Shaughnessy	3–6, 4–6
Win	2004	Kremlin Cup, Russia	Carpet (i)	(Russia) Vera Zvonareva	(Spain) Virginia Ruano Pascual (Argentina) Paola Suárez	6–3, 4–6, 6–2

== WTA Tour finals ==
=== Singles: 19 (10 titles, 9 runner-ups) ===
Legend Grand Slam (1–0) Tier I (2–1) Tier II (3–4) Tier III, IV & V (4–4)	Finals by surface Hard (4–4) Grass (0–3) Clay (3–1) Carpet (3–1)	Finals by setting Outdoor (6–7) Indoor (4–2)

Result	W–L	Date	Tournament	Tier	Surface	Opponent	Score
Win	1–0	Jul 1999	Palermo Ladies Open, Italy	Tier IV	Clay	(Spain) Ángeles Montolio	3–6, 7–6^{(7–3)}, 6–2
Loss	1–1	Jun 2002	Birmingham Classic, United Kingdom	Tier III	Grass	(Serbia and Montenegro) Jelena Dokić	2–6, 3–6
Loss	1–2	Jun 2002	Eastbourne International, UK	Tier II	Grass	(United States) Chanda Rubin	1–6, 3–6
Win	2–2	Sep 2002	Brasil Open	Tier II	Hard	(Greece) Eleni Daniilidou	6–3, 0–6, 6–2
Loss	2–3	Sep 2002	Sparkassen Cup, Germany	Tier II	Carpet (i)	(United States) Serena Williams	3–6, 2–6
Win	3–3	Feb 2003	Qatar Open	Tier III	Hard	(Russia) Elena Likhovtseva	6–3, 6–1
Win	4–3	Apr 2003	Sarasota Classic, United States	Tier IV	Clay	(Australia) Alicia Molik	6–4, 6–1
Win	5–3	Sep 2003	Sparkassen Cup, Germany	Tier II	Carpet (i)	(Belgium) Justine Henin-Hardenne	3–6, 6–3, 6–3
Win	6–3	Oct 2003	Kremlin Cup, Russia	Tier I	Carpet (i)	(France) Amélie Mauresmo	6–2, 6–4
Loss	6–4	Nov 2003	Philadelphia Championships, US	Tier II	Hard (i)	(France) Amélie Mauresmo	7–5, 0–6, 2–6
Win	7–4	Mar 2004	Qatar Ladies Open (2)	Tier II	Hard	(Russia) Svetlana Kuznetsova	4–6, 6–4, 6–4
Win	8–4	Jun 2004	French Open	Grand Slam	Clay	(Russia) Elena Dementieva	6–1, 6–2
Loss	8–5	Aug 2004	San Diego Open, US	Tier I	Hard	(United States) Lindsay Davenport	1–6, 1–6
Win	9–5	Oct 2004	Kremlin Cup, Russia (2)	Tier I	Carpet (i)	(Russia) Elena Dementieva	7–5, 6–0
Loss	9–6	Aug 2005	Nordic Light Open, Sweden	Tier IV	Hard	(Slovenia) Katarina Srebotnik	5–7, 2–6
Win	10–6	Sep 2005	Kolkata Open, India	Tier III	Hard (i)	(Croatia) Karolina Šprem	6–2, 6–2
Loss	10–7	May 2006	İstanbul Cup, Turkey	Tier III	Clay	(Israel) Shahar Pe'er	6–1, 3–6, 6–7^{(3–7)}
Loss	10–8	Jun 2006	Eastbourne International, UK	Tier II	Grass	(Belgium) Justine Henin-Hardenne	6–4, 1–6, 6–7^{(5–7)}
Loss	10–9	Aug 2006	Nordic Light Open, Sweden	Tier IV	Hard	(China) Zheng Jie	4–6, 1–6

=== Doubles: 6 (5 titles, 1 runner-up) ===
Legend Grand Slam (0–0) Tier I (1–1) Tier II (2–0) Tier III, IV & V (2–0)	Finals by surface Hard (3–0) Grass (0–0) Clay (1–0) Carpet (1–1)	Finals by setting Outdoor (2–0) Indoor (3–1)

Result	W–L	Date	Tournament	Tier	Surface	Partner	Opponent	Score
Loss	0–1	Oct 2003	Kremlin Cup, Russia	Tier I	Carpet (i)	(Russia) Vera Zvonareva	(Russia) Nadia Petrova (United States) Meghann Shaughnessy	3–6, 4–6
Win	1–1	Sep 2004	Wismilak International, Indonesia	Tier III	Hard	(Japan) Ai Sugiyama	(Russia) Svetlana Kuznetsova (Spain) Arantxa Sánchez Vicario	6–3, 7–5
Win	2–1	Oct 2004	Kremlin Cup, Russia	Tier I	Carpet (i)	(Russia) Vera Zvonareva	(Spain) Virginia Ruano Pascual (Argentina) Paola Suárez	6–3, 4–6, 6–2
Win	3–1	Sep 2005	Kolkata Open, India	Tier III	Hard (i)	(Russia) Elena Likhovtseva	(United States) Neha Uberoi (India) Shikha Uberoi	6–1, 6–0
Win	4–1	Oct 2005	Stuttgart Grand Prix, Germany	Tier II	Hard (i)	(Slovakia) Daniela Hantuchová	(Czech Republic) Květa Peschke (Italy) Francesca Schiavone	6–0, 3–6, 7–5
Win	5–1	May 2006	Warsaw Open, Poland	Tier II	Clay	(Russia) Elena Likhovtseva	(Spain) Anabel Medina Garrigues (Slovenia) Katarina Srebotnik	6–3, 6–4

== ITF Circuit finals ==
=== Singles: 6 (3 titles, 3 runner-ups) ===
Legend
$25,000 tournaments
$10,000 tournaments

Result	W–L	Date	Tournament	Surface	Opponent	Score
Win	1–0	12 October 1997	Batumi, Georgia	Grass	(Russia) Elena Dementieva	6–7^{(1–7)}, 6–4, 7–5
Win	2–0	21 June 1998	Tallinn, Estonia	Clay	(Finland) Minna Rautajoki	7–5, 6–3
Loss	2–1	20 September 1998	Biograd na Moru, Croatia	Clay	(Poland) Anna Bieleń-Żarska	4–6, 7–5, 6–7^{(5–7)}
Loss	2–2	11 October 1998	Batumi, Georgia	Carpet	(Netherlands) Amanda Hopmans	2–6, 5–7
Win	3–2	27 June 1999	Gorizia, Italy	Clay	(Spain) Ángeles Montolio	6–1, 6–3
Loss	3–3	4 July 1999	Orbetello, Italy	Clay	(Italy) Laura Dell'Angelo	3–6, 6–7^{(8–10)}

=== Doubles: 4 (3 titles, 1 runner-up) ===
Result	W–L	Date	Tournament	Surface	Partner	Opponents	Score
Win	1–0	1 June 1997	Istanbul, Turkey	Clay	(Russia) Elena Dementieva	(Turkey) Seden Özlü (Turkey) Stela Penciu	6–0, 6–2
Win	2–0	5 October 1997	Tbilisi, Georgia	Clay	(Russia) Elena Dementieva	(Ukraine) Anna Zaporozhanova (Belarus) Vera Zhukovets	3–6, 6–0, 6–4
Win	3–0	12 October 1997	Batumi, Georgia	Grass	(Russia) Elena Dementieva	(Slovakia) Danica Kováčová (Ukraine) Irina Nossenko	6–1, 1–0 ret.
Loss	3–1	21 June 1999	Orbetello, Italy	Clay	(Russia) Maria Goloviznina	(Argentina) Mariana Díaz Oliva (Argentina) Clarisa Fernández	4–6, 2–6

== Singles performance timeline ==
Key
W	F	SF	QF	#R	RR	Q#	DNQ	A	NH

(W) winner; (F) finalist; (SF) semifinalist; (QF) quarterfinalist; (#R) rounds 4, 3, 2, 1; (RR) round-robin stage; (Q#) qualification round; (DNQ) did not qualify; (A) absent; (NH) not held; (SR) strike rate (events won / competed); (W–L) win–loss record.

Tournament	1999	2000	2001	2002	2003	2004	2005	2006	2007	Career SR	Career W-L	Total
Australian Open	A	A	A	2R	QF	QF	4R	4R	A	0 / 5	14–5	N/A
French Open	A	1R	1R	1R	2R	W	1R	4R	1R	1 / 8	11–7	N/A
Wimbledon	A	3R	2R	3R	4R	3R	QF	QF	A	0 / 7	18–7	N/A
US Open	2R	1R	1R	3R	QF	2R	3R	1R	A	0 / 8	10–8	N/A
Grand Slam SR	0 / 1	0 / 3	0 / 3	0 / 4	0 / 4	1 / 4	0 / 4	0 / 4	0 / 1	1 / 28	N/A	N/A
GS win-loss	1–1	2–3	1–3	5–4	12–4	14–3	8–4	10–4	0–1	N/A	53–27	N/A
WTA Tour; Championships	A	A	A	1R	RR	SF	A	A	A	0 / 3	3–5	N/A
Tier I tournaments
Tokyo	A	A	A	Q1	A	A	A	SF	A	0 / 2	2–2	N/A
Indian Wells	A	1R	A	4R	2R	SF	A	4R	A	0 / 5	8–5	N/A
Miami	A	3R	1R	3R	2R	A	4R	QF	A	0 / 6	8–6	N/A
Charleston	A	2R	1R	QF	2R	A	2R	A	A	0 / 5	4–5	N/A
Rome	A	A	1R	2R	QF	QF	2R	3R	A	0 / 5	9–5	N/A
Berlin	A	A	Q1	2R	2R	QF	2R	A	A	0 / 5	2–5	N/A
San Diego	A	A	A	3R	A	F	A	A	A	0 / 2	5–2	N/A
Montreal/Toronto	A	1R	Q2	1R	3R	SF	SF	2R	A	0 / 7	8–7	N/A
Moscow	2R	A	SF	1R	W	W	QF	A	A	2 / 9	18–7	N/A
Zurich	A	QF	Q1	2R	A	A	SF	1R	A	0 / 5	9–5	N/A
Career statistics
Finals reached	1	0	0	4	5	4	2	3	0	N/A	N/A	19
Tournaments won	1	0	0	1	4	3	1	0	0	N/A	N/A	10
Hard outdoors W-L	4–4	3–7	2–3	19–11	15–8	27–10	14–8	13–10	0–1	N/A	97–62	N/A
Hard indoors W-L	0–0	2–2	0–1	0–1	6–5	5–4	5–2	0–0	0–0	N/A	18–15	N/A
Clay W-L	5–1	6–6	1–4	12–8	11–6	12–2	3–6	8–4	0–1	N/A	58–38	N/A
Grass W-L	0–0	5–3	3–2	10–3	3–2	2–1	5–2	8–2	0–0	N/A	36–15	N/A
Carpet W-L	1–1	0–0	5–2	6–5	11–1	9–1	9–2	2–1	0–0	N/A	43–13	N/A
Overall W-L	10–6	16–18	11–12	47–28	46–22	55–18	36–20	31–17	0–2	N/A	252–143	N/A
Year-end ranking	65	58	59	11	7	3	14	16	1038	N/A	N/A	[2]

== Head-to-head records ==
=== Record against top 10 players ===
Myskina's record against players who have been ranked in the top 10. Active players are in boldface.

**Player**	**Record**	**Win%**	**Hard**	**Clay**	**Grass**	**Carpet**	**Last match**
Number 1 ranked players							
(Serbia) Ana Ivanovic	1–0	100%	–	1–0	–	–	Won (6–2, 6–3) at 2006 French Open
(Serbia) Jelena Janković	3–0	100%	–	1–0	2–0	–	Won (6–4, 7–6^{(7–5)}) at 2006 Wimbledon
(Spain) Arantxa Sánchez Vicario	1–0	100%	–	1–0	–	–	Won (7–6^{(7–4)}, 7–6^{(9–7)}) at 2002 Charleston
(Russia) Dinara Safina	4–1	80%	3–1	1–0	–	–	Lost (1–6, 3–6) at 2006 Indian Wells
**(Belarus) Victoria Azarenka**	2–1	67%	1–1	1–0	–	–	Lost (4–6, 2–6) at 2006 US Open
(Russia) Maria Sharapova	3–2	60%	3–2	–	–	–	Lost (3–6, 3–6) at 2006 Miami
**(United States) Venus Williams**	2–3	40%	0–2	2–1	–	–	Won (5–7, 6–4, 6–2) at 2005 Fed Cup
(Switzerland) Martina Hingis	1–2	33%	1–2	–	–	–	Lost (4–6, 3–6) at 2006 Dubai
(Belgium) Kim Clijsters	3–7	30%	0–5	0–2	1–0	2–0	Lost (4–6, 1–6) at 2005 Toronto
(United States) Jennifer Capriati	2–5	29%	1–2	1–2	0–1	–	Won (6–2, 6–2) at 2004 French Open
(United States) Lindsay Davenport	2–7	22%	1–7	–	–	1–0	Lost (0–6, 4–6) at 2005 Zurich
(Belgium) Justine Henin	2–8	20%	1–5	0–2	0–1	1–0	Lost (6–4, 1–6, 6–7^{(5–7)}) at 2006 Eastbourne
(France) Amélie Mauresmo	1–9	10%	0–4	0–1	0–3	1–1	Lost (1–6, 6–3, 3–6) at 2006 Wimbledon
(United States) Serena Williams	0–5	0%	0–2	0–1	–	0–2	Lost (2–6, 2–6) at 2006 Cincinnati
Number 2 ranked players							
(Spain) Conchita Martínez	3–1	75%	2–1	–	1–0	–	Lost (4–6, 5–7) at 2005 Doha
**(Russia) Vera Zvonareva**	3–1	75%	2–0	0–1	–	1–0	Lost (6–2, 3–0 ret.) at 2005 Zurich
**(Russia) Svetlana Kuznetsova**	4–2	67%	1–1	2–1	1–0	–	Won (6–4, 2–6, 6–4) at 2006 Eastbourne
(Poland) Agnieszka Radwańska	0–1	0%	–	0–1	–	–	Lost (4–6, 6–4, 4–6) at 2006 Warsaw
Number 3 ranked players							
(France) Mary Pierce	4–2	67%	2–0	1–2	–	1–0	Lost (6–4, 4–6, 2–6) at 2005 Fed Cup
(Russia) Elena Dementieva	9–6	60%	3–3	3–0	2–0	1–3	Lost (4–6, 6–3, 4–6) at 2006 Tokyo
(Russia) Nadia Petrova	3–2	60%	1–2	1–0	–	1–0	Lost (3–6, 6–4, 4–6) at 2004 Philadelphia
(South Africa) Amanda Coetzer	2–2	50%	2–0	–	0–1	0–1	Won (6–3, 6–0) at 2004 Sydney
(France) Nathalie Tauziat	0–1	0%	–	–	0–1	–	Lost (4–6, 2–6) at 2000 Eastbourne
Number 4 ranked players							
(Croatia) Iva Majoli	3–0	100%	–	1–0	–	2–0	Won (6–2, 7–5) at 2003 Fed Cup
(Italy) Francesca Schiavone	4–0	100%	3–0	1–0	–	–	Won (6–3, 6–2) at 2005 Hopman Cup
(Australia) Samantha Stosur	2–0	100%	1–0	–	–	1–0	Won (6–4, 6–1) at 2004 Fed Cup
(Bulgaria) Magdalena Maleeva	4–1	80%	1–0	–	1–0	2–1	Lost (2–6, 6–4, 6–2) at 2005 Moscow
(Australia) / (Federal Republic of Yugoslavia) Jelena Dokic	2–4	33%	1–2	1–1	0–1	–	Lost (3–6, 4–6) at 2002 WTA Finals
(United States) Mary Joe Fernández	0–1	0%	0–1	–	–	–	Lost (5–7, 5–7) at 1999 US Open
(Germany) Anke Huber	0–1	0%	–	0–1	–	–	Lost (3–6, 2–6) at 2000 Sopot
Number 5 ranked players							
(Slovakia) Daniela Hantuchová	2–0	100%	–	1–0	1–0	–	Won (6–2, 6–1) at 2002 Eastbourne
(Russia) Anna Chakvetadze	1–1	50%	1–1	–	–	–	Won (6–3, 6–2) at 2006 Miami
Number 6 ranked players							
(Italy) Flavia Pennetta	1–0	100%	1–0	–	–	–	Won (6–4, 6–0) at 2005 Miami
(United States) Chanda Rubin	5–2	71%	4–0	0–1	0–1	1–0	Won (6–4, 6–0) at 2004 Montréal
Number 7 ranked players							
(France) Marion Bartoli	1–0	100%	1–0	–	–	–	Won (4–2 ret.) at 2005 Dubai
(Austria) Barbara Schett	3–1	75%	1–0	1–0	–	1–1	Won (6–3, 6–4) at 2004 San Diego
(Italy) Roberta Vinci	2–1	67%	1–0	1–0	0–1	–	Won (6–0, 1–6, 6–4) at 2006 Rome
(Switzerland) Patty Schnyder	2–3	40%	1–3	–	1–0	–	Lost (2–6, 1–6) at 2006 Australian Open
(Czech Republic) Nicole Vaidišová	0–1	0%	–	0–1	–	–	Lost (3–6, 7–5, 4–6) at 2005 Charleston
Number 8 ranked players							
(Russia) Anna Kournikova	1–0	100%	–	–	–	1–0	Won (6–4, 3–6, 6–3) at 2001 Leipzig
(Australia) Alicia Molik	3–2	60%	1–1	2–0	–	0–1	Won (7–6^{(7–5)}, 6–3) at 2006 Stockholm
(Japan) Ai Sugiyama	2–3	40%	1–2	–	1–1	–	Lost (6–7^{(2–7)}, 7–6^{(8–6)}, 6–4) at 2006 Doha
Number 9 ranked players							
(Argentina) Paola Suárez	1–1	50%	–	0–1	1–0	–	Won (7–6^{(7–5)}, 6–2) at 2001 Wimbledon
(Switzerland) Timea Bacsinszky	0–1	0%	0–1	–	–	–	Lost (3–6, 3–6) at 2006 Zurich
(Belgium) Dominique Monami	0–1	0%	0–1	–	–	–	Lost (2–6, 3–6) at 2000 Olympics
(France) Sandrine Testud	0–1	0%	–	0–1	–	–	Lost (4–6, 5–7) at 2002 Berlin
Number 10 ranked players							
(Slovakia) Karina Habšudová	0–1	0%	–	–	–	0–1	Lost (6–4, 3–6, 3–6) at 1998 Moscow
**Total**	**94–94**	**50%**	**42–52 (45%)**	**23–20 (53%)**	**12–11 (52%)**	**17–11 (61%)**	

=== No. 1 wins ===
#	Player	Event	Surface	Rd	Score	Result
1.	(Belgium) Kim Clijsters	2003 Sparkassen Cup, Germany	Carpet (i)	SF	5–7, 4–4, ret.	**W**
2.	(United States) Lindsay Davenport	2004 WTA Championships, US	Hard (i)	RR	7–6^{(7–5)}, 6–4	SF

=== Top 10 wins ===
- She has a 22–51 record against players who were, at the time the match was played, ranked in the top 10.

Season	2002	2003	2004	2005	2006	Total
Wins	5	3	10	3	1	22

#	Opponent	Rank	Event	Surface	Rd	Score	AMR
**2002**
1.	(Federal Republic of Yugoslavia) Jelena Dokic	No. 9	Italian Open	Clay	3R	5–7, 6–4, 6–3	No. 30
2.	(Belgium) Justine Henin-Hardenne	No. 7	Connecticut Open, US	Hard	2R	7–6^{(7–2)}, 6–2	No. 16
3.	(Switzerland) Martina Hingis	No. 8	Connecticut Open, US	Hard	QF	6–7^{(2–7)}, 6–4, 6–0	No. 16
4.	(Federal Republic of Yugoslavia) Jelena Dokic	No. 8	Brasil Open	Hard	SF	6–2, 6–4	No. 15
5.	(Belgium) Kim Clijsters	No. 8	Sparkassen Cup, Germany	Carpet (i)	SF	6–4, 5–7, 7–6^{(7–3)}	No. 12
**2003**
6.	(Belgium) Kim Clijsters	**No. 1**	Sparkassen Cup, Germany	Carpet (i)	SF	5–7, 4–4, ret.	No. 10
7.	(Belgium) Justine Henin-Hardenne	No. 2	Sparkassen Cup, Germany	Carpet (i)	F	3–6, 6–3, 6–3	No. 10
8.	(France) Amélie Mauresmo	No. 7	Kremlin Cup, Russia	Carpet (i)	F	6–2, 6–4	No. 10
**2004**
9.	(United States) Chanda Rubin	No. 10	Australian Open	Hard	4R	6–7^{(3–7)}, 6–2, 6–2	No. 7
10.	(United States) Jennifer Capriati	No. 5	Qatar Open	Hard	SF	6–2, 6–2	No. 7
11.	(United States) Venus Williams	No. 9	French Open	Clay	QF	6–3, 6–4	No. 5
12.	(United States) Jennifer Capriati	No. 6	French Open	Clay	SF	6–2, 6–2	No. 5
13.	(Russia) Elena Dementieva	No. 10	French Open	Clay	F	6–1, 6–2	No. 5
14.	(Russia) Maria Sharapova	No. 8	San Diego Open, US	Hard	QF	7–5, 6–2	No. 5
15.	(United States) Lindsay Davenport	No. 2	Kremlin Cup, Russia	Carpet (i)	SF	6–4, 7–6^{(7–1)}	No. 4
16.	(Russia) Elena Dementieva	No. 6	Kremlin Cup, Russia	Carpet (i)	F	7–5, 6–0	No. 4
17.	(Russia) Elena Dementieva	No. 5	WTA Championships, US	Hard	RR	6–3, 6–3	No. 3
18.	(United States) Lindsay Davenport	**No. 1**	WTA Championships, US	Hard	RR	7–6^{(7–5)}, 6–4	No. 3
**2005**
19.	(Russia) Elena Dementieva	No. 5	Wimbledon Championships, UK	Grass	4R	1–6, 7–6^{(11–9)}, 7–5	No. 10
20.	(United States) Venus Williams	No. 8	Fed Cup, Russia	Clay (i)	SF	5–7, 6–4, 6–2	No. 10
21.	(Russia) Elena Dementieva	No. 8	Zurich Open, Switzerland	Hard	QF	6–3, 6–7^{(1–7)}, 6–4	No. 12
**2006**
22.	(Russia) Svetlana Kuznetsova	No. 7	Eastbourne International, UK	Grass	SF	6–4, 2–6, 6–4	No. 11

== Other ==
She appeared in the first season of ice show contest Ice Age.

== Awards and honours ==
- ITF World Champion: 2004.

National

- Sports title "Merited Master of Sports of Russia" (2004).
- Sports title "Merited Coach of Russia" (2021).
- Order of Friendship (2009).

== See also ==
- List of Grand Slam women's singles champions

Awards and achievements
Preceded by (Belgium) Justine Henin	ITF World Champion; 2004	Succeeded by (Belgium) Kim Clijsters
