= Sunfeast Open =

International tennis tournament organized in India

Defunct tennis tournament
- Founded: 2005
- Abolished: 2008
- Location: Kolkata; India
- Venue: Netaji Indoor Stadium
- Category: Tier III
- Surface: Hard / Indoors
- Draw: 32M/16Q/16D
- Prize money: $175,000

The Sunfeast Open (named after sponsor Sunfeast of ITC Limited) was an annual WTA Tour tennis tournament that was started in Kolkata in 2005. The event was a Tier III-tournament with a prize money of USD 175,000 and was played on indoors greenset. The fourth edition of the WTA Sunfeast Open, slated to be held in Kolkata from 6–12 October 2008, was shifted to Mumbai as the dates clash with the Durga Puja. The 2008 tournament in Mumbai, was to be held outdoors in the premises of Cricket Club of India, unlike the previous three editions. ITC, an Indian conglomerate based out of Kolkata was the primary sponsor of the event. The company owns the Sunfeast brand of biscuits.

Since 2008, the Sunfeast Open, has no longer been listed on the WTA calendar and hence has been cancelled after running into trouble regarding venues.

== Past finals ==
=== Singles ===
Year	Champion	Runner-up	Score
2005	(Russia) Anastasia Myskina	(Croatia) Karolina Šprem	6–2, 6–2
2006	(Switzerland) Martina Hingis	(Russia) Olga Puchkova	6–0, 6–4
2007	(Russia) Maria Kirilenko	(Ukraine) Mariya Koryttseva	6–0, 6–2

=== Doubles ===
Year	Champion	Runner-up	Score
2005	(Russia) Elena Likhovtseva (Russia) Anastasia Myskina	(United States) Neha Uberoi (India) Shikha Uberoi	6–1, 6–0
2006	(India) Sania Mirza (South Africa) Liezel Huber	(Ukraine) Yuliya Beygelzimer (Ukraine) Yuliana Fedak	6–4, 6–0
2007	(Russia) Alla Kudryavtseva (United States) Vania King	(Italy) Alberta Brianti (Ukraine) Mariya Koryttseva	6–1, 6–4

== See also ==
- List of tennis tournaments
