= Vilmarie Castellvi =

Puerto Rican tennis player

- Country (sports): Puerto Rico
- Born: March 21, 1981 (age 44) Guaynabo, Puerto Rico
- Turned pro: March 1995
- Retired: February 2008
- Plays: Right-handed (two-handed backhand)
- College: University of Tennessee
- Prize money: US$ 148,584

Singles
- Career record: 143–111
- Career titles: 2 ITF
- Highest ranking: No. 125 (September 20, 2004)

Grand Slam singles results
- Australian Open: Q2 (2005)
- French Open: Q2 (2004)
- Wimbledon: Q3 (2004, 2005, 2006)
- US Open: Q3 (2004, 2005)

Doubles
- Career record: 34–37
- Career titles: 4 ITF
- Highest ranking: No. 228 (July 17, 2006)

Vilmarie Castellvi (born 21 March 1981) is a former professional tennis player from Puerto Rico.

She received a wildcard to play at the 2005 Sunfeast Open and defeated Emmanuelle Gagliardi in the first round but lost to Karolina Šprem in the second; this was her best WTA Tour performance. She did not qualify for any Grand Slam events.

== College ==
While at Tennessee, Castellvi won the Honda Sports Award as the nation's best female tennis player in 2003.

== ITF finals ==
$50,000 tournaments
$25,000 tournaments
$10,000 tournaments

=== Singles (2–5) ===
Result	No.	Date	Tournament	Surface	Opponent	Score
Loss	1.	1 August 1999	ITF Baltimore, United States	Hard	(United States) Whitney Laiho	6–3, 3–6, 4–6
Win	2.	30 July 2002	ITF Harrisonburg, United States	Hard	(United States) Varvara Lepchenko	6–2, 6–0
Loss	3.	13 July 2003	Vancouver Open, Canada	Hard	(Germany) Anna-Lena Grönefeld	2–6, 4–6
Win	4.	13 October 2003	ITF Mexico City	Hard	(France) Kildine Chevalier	6–2, 4–6, 7–6^{(4)}
Loss	5.	4 April 2004	ITF Augusta, United States	Hard	(United States) Tara Snyder	5–7, 2–6
Loss	6.	8 August 2004	ITF Louisville, United States	Hard	(Japan) Aiko Nakamura	4–6, 2–6
Loss	7.	5 September 2005	ITF Beijing, China	Carpet (i)	(China) Yuan Meng	6–4, 4–6, 4–6

=== Doubles (4–1) ===
Result	No.	Date	Tournament	Surface	Partner	Opponents	Score
Win	1.	29 July 2001	ITF Evansville, United States	Hard	(United States) Alison Ojeda	(South Africa) Anca Anastasiu (South Africa) Lara van Rooyen	6–2, 6–3
Win	2.	21 July 2002	ITF Baltimore, United States	Hard	(United States) Agnes Wiski	(Belarus) Natallia Dziamidzenka (South Korea) Kim Jin-hee	6–1, 3–6, 6–3
Loss	3.	16 May 2004	ITF Charlottesville, United States	Clay	(United States) Sunitha Rao	(Argentina) Erica Krauth (United States) Jessica Lehnhoff	0–6, 1–6
Win	4.	31 July 2005	ITF Lexington, United States	Hard	(United States) Samantha Reeves	(Japan) Kumiko Iijima (Japan) Junri Namigata	6–2, 6–1
Win	5.	26 June 2007	ITF Edmond, United States	Hard	(United States) Kim Anh Nguyen	(Slovakia) Dominika Diešková (United States) Courtney Nagle	7–5, 1–6, 6–2
