= Shikha Uberoi =

Indian-born American tennis player

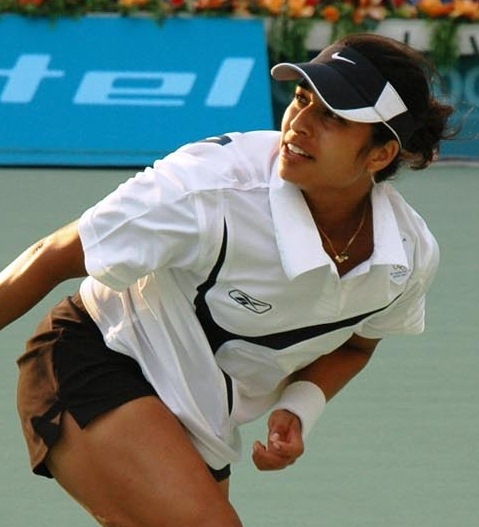
- Uberoi at the 2006 Asian Games
- Country (sports): United States; India
- Residence: Princeton, New Jersey, U.S.
- Born: 5 April 1983 (age 43) Bombay, Maharashtra, India
- Height: 1.73 m (5 ft 8 in)
- Turned pro: August 2003
- Retired: 2011
- Plays: Right-handed (two-handed backhand)
- Prize money: US$ 213,828

Singles
- Career record: 192–205
- Career titles: 3 ITF
- Highest ranking: No. 122 (29 August 2005)

Grand Slam singles results
- Australian Open: Q2 (2005, 2006)
- French Open: Q2 (2006)
- Wimbledon: Q2 (2005, 2006)
- US Open: 2R (2004)

Doubles
- Career record: 106–149
- Career titles: 2 ITF
- Highest ranking: No. 87 (19 February 2007)

Grand Slam doubles results
- Wimbledon: Q1 (2006, 2007)
- US Open: 1R (2004)
Medal record
Representing India
Women's tennis
Asian Games
Silver medal – second place	2006 Doha	Women's team

Shikha Devi Uberoi (born 5 April 1983) is an Indian-American former professional tennis player, who formerly represented India in international tournaments and a former Indian No. 1. After Nirupama Sanjeev, she is also the second Indian female player to enter the top 200 of the WTA rankings.

== Biography ==
Oberoi was born to father Mahesh (who was a table-tennis player for India) and mother Madhu in Mumbai, Maharashtra. Her family moved to Princeton, New Jersey when she was an infant. She has one older sister (Diya) and three younger sisters (Neha, Nikita and Nimita). Her four sisters are also tennis players - Shikha is by far the most successful, and the only one to represent India (the other sisters represent the United States). She is the niece of actor Suresh Oberoi and first cousin of actors Vivek Oberoi and Akshay Oberoi. She also holds an Overseas Citizenship of India card.

She was named the Zee Astitva Athlete of the Year 2007. She was one of the top-10 fastest servers in the world. She earned her bachelor's degree from Princeton University in Anthropology and South Asian Studies. She graduated with high academic standing while winning Princeton's prestigious Kit Harris Memorial Award for Leadership and Ethics.

Uberoi launched her media and lifestyle company, SDU Seva, Inc. As of 2013, she is currently creating and producing international social issue television shows, and is a social entrepreneur. She speaks internationally at various diplomatic conferences on female empowerment through sport. She has recently been invited to sit on the board of directors of the World Economic Forum's "Global Shapers Initiative" for Bhopal. She is also a news and sports presenter, and coaches all levels of tennis and fitness.

== Tennis career ==
Uberoi started competing in the ITF Women's Circuit in 1998. In August 2002, she played in her first WTA Tour-level tournament as a wildcard at the New Haven Open, during the 2002 season. She lost her opening qualifying match to Elena Bovina. She would next compete in a WTA tournament a year later in March 2003, at the Sarasota Clay Court Classic, again losing in the first qualifying round to Tara Snyder. The highlight of 2003 would be her winning her first title in August, where she won a $10k tournament in Harrisonburg, Virginia, with five match wins. Later that same year in November, she lost in first qualifying round of the Advanta Championships of Philadelphia to Anikó Kapros.

Uberoi won her first WTA Tour-level match in 2004, albeit at the qualifying level. She defeated Liza Viplav and Aiko Nakamura, before losing to sister Neha in the qualifying finals of the Hyderabad Open. Two weeks later, she lost in the qualifying first round at the Qatar Ladies Open to Li Ting. Uberoi finally got to compete in the main draw of a professional-level tournament at the Budapest Grand Prix, with qualifying wins over Christiane Hoppmann, Cristina Torrens Valero, and Edina Gallovits; she would lose the round one encounter to Marion Bartoli later in the tournament.

At the 2004 US Open, Uberoi was competing in her first ever Grand Slam tournament as a wildcard into the qualifying draw. Win three wins over Ivana Abramović, Anne Kremer, and Vilmarie Castellvi, she entered the main draw. She then won her first-round match, defeating Saori Obata. She lost to Venus Williams in round two, having led 4–1 in the first set against the multiple Grand Slam champion. During the 2004 season, Shikha won two further (and ultimately her last two) ITF singles titles in Fort Worth and Edmond.

During the Australian swing at the beginning of the 2005 WTA Tour, Uberoi lost in the qualifying stages of the Gold Coast Hardcourts, the Hobart International, and the Australian Open, losing to Yan Zi, Sunitha Rao, and Teryn Ashley, respectively. However, in early February, she won against Olga Savchuk, Yuan Meng, and Tatiana Poutchek back to back to make the main draw of the Pattaya Open in Thailand, but lost to Conchita Martínez in round one. The following week, she received direct entry into the main draw of a WTA event for the first time (at the Hyderabad Open), although she lost her opening match to Melinda Czink in three tight sets. She had somewhat of a decent form at the Indian Wells Open in March, with solid wins over Saori Obata, Ekaterina Bychkova (both in qualifying), and Akiko Morigami (round one). But, she lost her opening qualifying matches to Aiko Nakamura and Angela Haynes at Miami and Charleston, respectively. In May 2005, she lost in the first round of the Rabat Grand Prix to Yan Zi, and also failed to qualify for both the Italian Open and Roland Garros. Uberoi also had poor form on the grass court tournaments, failing to qualify at the Birmingham Classic, as well as Wimbledon. During the North American hardcourt swing, she only managed to compete in one main-draw match, losing to Dally Randriantefy at the Canadian Open. The highlight of her 2005 season was reaching the quarterfinals of the Sunfeast Open in Kolkata (being only the second player representing India to reach a WTA quarterfinal; Sania Mirza was the first one, winning the Hyderabad title earlier that same year). Also in 2005, Shikha reached two WTA Tour doubles finals, partnering sister Neha, one in Kolkata and one in Guangzhou.

In 2006, Uberoi qualified for the Qatar Ladies Open, but lost to María Vento-Kabchi in the first round. She would not have any significant results until the Estoril Open in May, where she won three matches, only to lose to Maret Ani in the first round. The only other (main draw) WTA tournament she competed in that year was the Japan Open, where she was defeated by Vera Dushevina. She did represent her country at the 2006 Asian Games where she defeated Linda Ahmad of Bahrain in round one, but lost in the second round to Zheng Jie of China.

In January 2007, Uberoi was the doubles finalist at the Auckland Open, partnering Hsieh Su-wei. Being awarded a wildcard into the Bangalore International, she lost to Ágnes Szávay. This would be the last time she would compete in a WTA Tour main draw. Following this, Uberoi had limited success on the ITF Circuit, playing irregularly until mid-2011. Her last singles win was in the qualifying draw of the $50k Lexington Challenger, in late July 2010, against He Chun-yan. She played her final singles match in the next tournament she participated in, a year later, at the same tournament in July 2011, losing to Amanda Fink in the first qualifying round. In doubles, at the same Lexington tournament in 2011, she paired with Jennifer Elie to win her final match, before losing in the quarterfinals. Since then, Uberoi has competed in one last doubles tournament, a $25k event in Mumbai in November 2014, where she and partner Rishika Sunkara lost their opening match.

== WTA career finals ==
=== Doubles: 3 (3 runner-ups) ===
Legend
Grand Slam
Tier I
Tier II
Tier III, IV & V

Outcome	No.	Date	Tournament	Surface	Partner	Opponents	Score
Runner-up	1.	25 September 2005	Sunfeast Open, India	Hard	(United States) Neha Uberoi	(Russia) Elena Likhovtseva (Russia) Anastasia Myskina	6–1, 6–0
Runner-up	2.	2 October 2005	Guangzhou Open, China	Hard	(United States) Neha Uberoi	(Italy) Maria Elena Camerin (Switzerland) Emmanuelle Gagliardi	7–6^{(7–5)}, 6–3
Runner-up	3.	7 January 2007	Auckland Open, New Zealand	Hard	(Chinese Taipei) Hsieh Su-wei	(Slovakia) Janette Husárová (Argentina) Paola Suárez	6–0, 6–2

== ITF finals ==
=== Singles (3–0) ===
Legend $25,000 tournaments $10,000 tournaments	Finals by surface Hard (3–0) Clay (0–0)

Outcome	No.	Date	Tournament	Surface	Opponent	Score
Winner	1.	3 August 2003	ITF Harrisonburg, United States	Hard	(India) Meghha Vakaria	6–1, 6–1
Winner	2.	20 June 2004	ITF Fort Worth, United States	Hard	(United States) Neha Uberoi	6–1, 6–2
Winner	3.	27 June 2004	ITF Edmond, United States	Hard	(Republic of Ireland) Anne Mall	6–2, 6–4

=== Doubles (3–3) ===
Legend $25,000 tournaments $10,000 tournaments	Finals by surface Hard (2–2) Clay (1–1)

Outcome	No.	Date	Tournament	Surface	Partner	Opponents	Score
Winner	1.	21 February 2000	ITF Victoria, Mexico	Hard	(United States) Brandi Freudenberg	(Mexico) Maria Eugenia Brito (Mexico) Alejandra Rivero	6–1, 6–1
Runner-up	1.	20 June 2004	ITF Fort Worth, United States	Hard	(United States) Neha Uberoi	(United States) Vania King (Republic of Ireland) Anne Mall	6–2, 3–6, 6–7^{(5)}
Runner-up	2.	21 June 2008	ITF Houston, United States	Hard	(United States) Kim-Anh Nguyen	(United States) Catrina Thompson (United States) Christian Thompson	3–6, 5–7
Winner	2.	14 June 2009	ITF El Paso, United States	Hard	(United States) Christina Fusano	(Brazil) Maria Fernanda Alves (Ukraine) Tetiana Luzhanska	6–3, 7–5
Runner-up	3.	26 June 2011	ITF Cleveland, United States	Clay	(New Zealand) Dianne Hollands	(United States) Brooke Austin (United States) Brooke Bolender	6–7^{(2)}, 3–6
Winner	3.	3 July 2011	ITF Buffalo, United States	Clay	(New Zealand) Dianne Hollands	(Poland) Paulina Bigos (Canada) Brittany Wowchuk	7–5, 6–4
