= Karolina Šprem =

Croatian tennis player (born 1984)

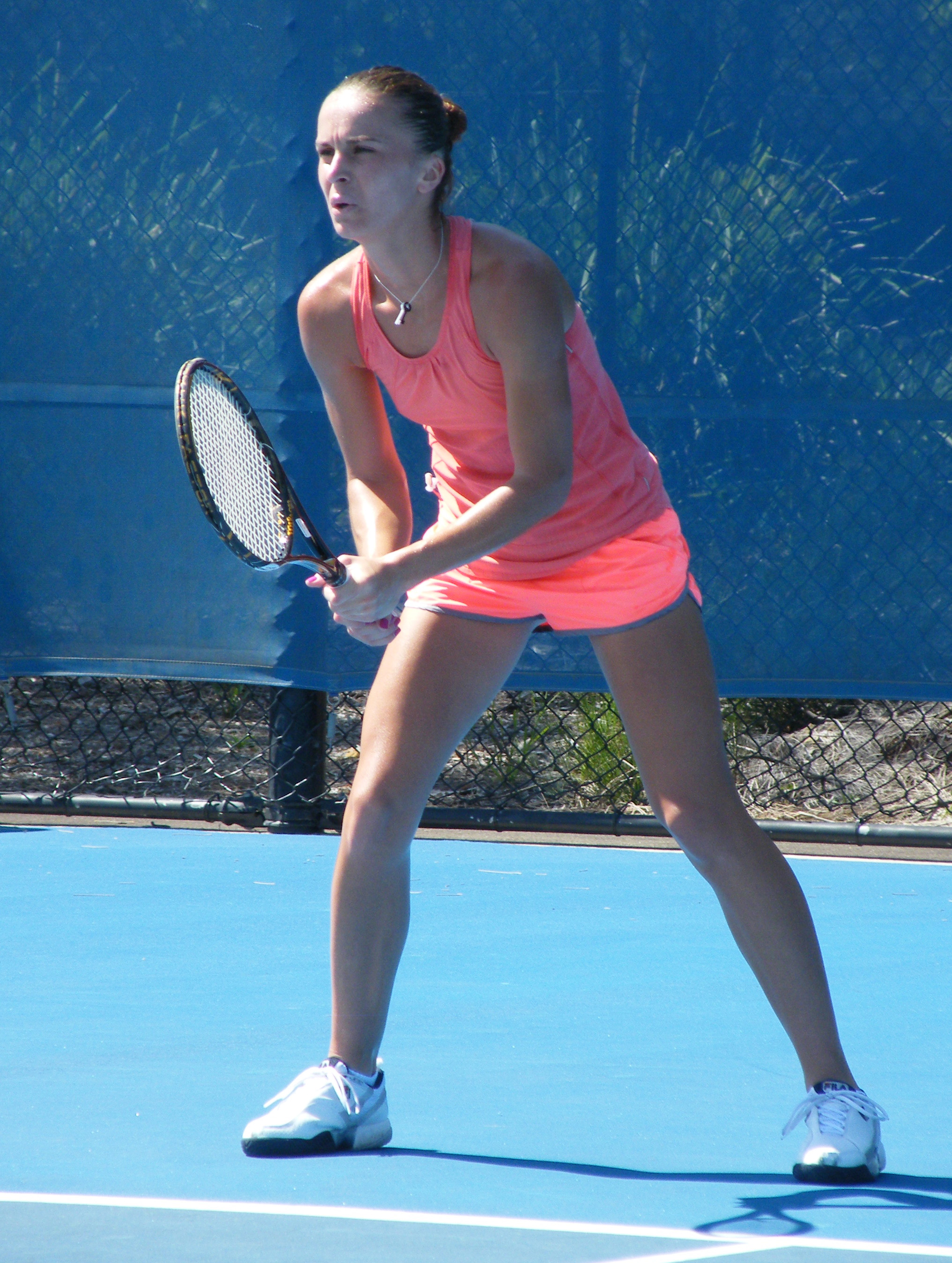
- Šprem at the 2010 NSW Medibank Tennis Open
- Country (sports): Croatia
- Residence: Varaždin, Croatia
- Born: 25 October 1984 (age 41) Varaždin, SFRY
- Height: 1.74 m (5 ft 8 1/2 in)
- Turned pro: July 2001
- Retired: 2011
- Plays: Right-handed (two-handed backhand)
- Coach: Saša Hiršzon
- Prize money: $1,298,606

Singles
- Career record: 266–170
- Career titles: 0 WTA, 10 ITF
- Highest ranking: No. 17 (11 October 2004)

Grand Slam singles results
- Australian Open: 4R (2005)
- French Open: 3R (2006)
- Wimbledon: QF (2004)
- US Open: 1R (2003, 2004, 2005, 2006)

Other tournaments
- Olympic Games: 3R (2004)

Doubles
- Career record: 14–16
- Career titles: 0 WTA, 1 ITF
- Highest ranking: No. 182 (8 May 2006)

Grand Slam doubles results
- Australian Open: 2R (2006)
- Wimbledon: 1R (2005)

Team competitions
- Fed Cup: 9–7

Karolina Šprem Baghdatis (born 25 October 1984) is a former professional tennis player from Croatia. She won eleven titles (ten singles), all at the ITF level. Her highest ranking is world No. 17, achieved in October 2004.

== Personal life ==
Karolina was born to Gabro and Božena Šprem in Varaždin, SFRY. She was introduced to tennis by her father at nine years of age. She turned professional in July 2001.

Šprem represented Croatia at the 2004 Summer Olympics held in Athens where she reached the third round in singles and the second round in doubles (with Jelena Kostanić).

On 14 July 2012, Šprem married ATP player Marcos Baghdatis at Trakošćan Castle in Croatia. At Wimbledon, as a spectator for Baghdatis' match on centre court against Andy Murray, Šprem confirmed that she and Baghdatis were expecting their first child. Karolina gave birth to a girl, named Zahara, on 20 October 2012.

== Professional career ==
=== 2003–2006 ===
Šprem displayed stunning results at the beginning of the 2003 season. Playing on the ITF Circuit, she had a record 29-match winning streak from January to March, which earned her four titles at Grenoble, Southampton, Redbridge and Castellón.

Later in the year, she went on to reach two WTA Tour-level finals in Strasbourg and Vienna. She also reached the semifinals of the WTA Tour event in Helsinki, and won the ITF event in Poitiers.

Šprem's career highlight came 2004 at Wimbledon, where she was a quarterfinalist. She defeated the then-two-time champion, four-time finalist and world No. 8, Venus Williams, en route. Her run was ended by Lindsay Davenport. The umpire of her match against Venus had awarded her an extra point in the second set tiebreak by mistake.

After Wimbledon, Karolina struggled to find her good form she had, losing early in many tournaments. She began training with Borna Bikić.

She rebounded at the Australian Open 2005, where she had a run to the fourth round. In September 2005, at the WTA event in Kolkata, India, she reached the final after a string of good wins. However, she lost the final to Anastasia Myskina.

=== 2007–2009 ===
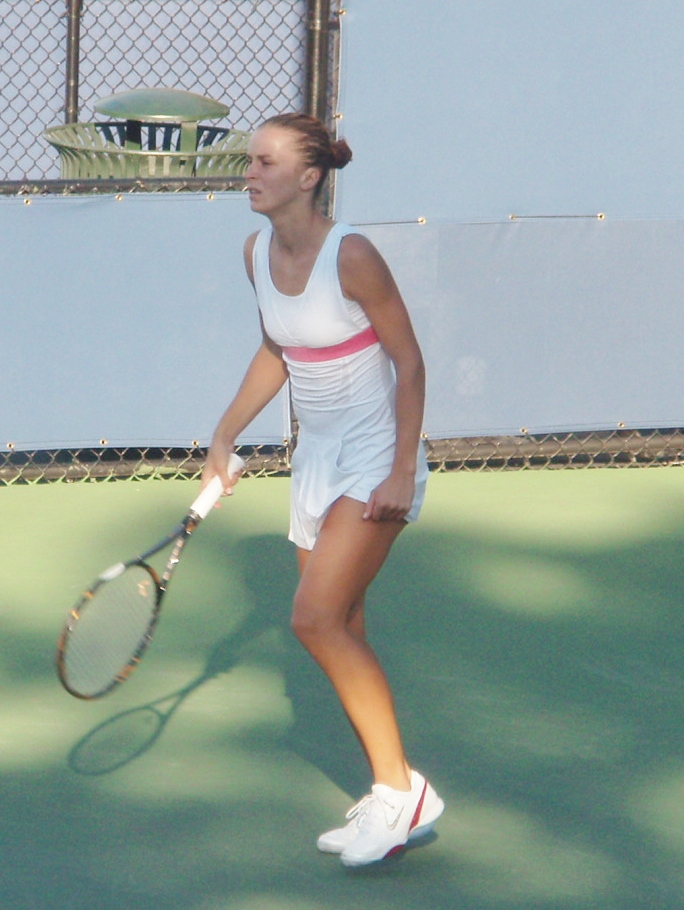
Sprem at the 2008 US Open

In late 2007, Šprem announced a permanent split from Bikic and returned to her old coach Ricardo Sanchez. She had to cope with a serious elbow injury, which needed surgery. She was out of the tour for 10 months.

In April 2008, she returned to the pro tour, winning in Amelia Island over Ai Sugiyama and top-10 player Daniela Hantuchová, before falling to Lindsay Davenport in the third round.

In July, Šprem made the semifinals of a Tier III event in Budapest.

In 2009, Karolina won three big ITF Circuit titles in Biberach, Torhout, and Mestre.

=== 2010–2011 ===
In 2010, she scored one of her biggest wins in years when she defeated 25th seed Anabel Medina Garrigues at the Australian Open.

During the Australian hard-court season in 2011, Karolina suffered a left-wrist injury, which forced her to stop competing. She tried playing in April at the tournament in Estoril, Portugal, but was unable to finish her first qualifying match against Heather Watson. This confirmed that the injury was very serious. She has been out of the tour since, and is still recovering.

== WTA career finals ==
=== Singles: 3 (3 runner-ups) ===
Winner – Legend
Grand Slam tournaments
Tier I
Tier II
Tier III, IV & V (0–3)

Finals by surface
Hard (0–1)
Grass (0–0)
Clay (0–2)
Carpet (0–0)

Outcome	No.	Date	Tournament	Surface	Opponent	Score
Runner-up	1.	24 May 2003	Internationaux de Strasbourg, France	Clay	(Italy) Silvia Farina Elia	3–6, 6–4, 4–6
Runner-up	2.	14 June 2003	Austrian Open, Vienna	Clay	(Argentina) Paola Suárez	6–7^{(0–7)}, 6–2, 4–6
Runner-up	3.	25 September 2005	Sunfeast Open, India	Hard (i)	(Russia) Anastasia Myskina	2–6, 2–6

== ITF Circuit finals ==
=== Singles: 14 (10–4) ===
$100,000 tournaments
$75,000 tournaments
$50,000 tournaments
$25,000 tournaments
$10,000 tournaments

Outcome	No.	Date	Tournament	Surface	Opponent	Score
Runner-up	1.	2 September 2001	Mostar, Bosnia	Clay	(Bosnia and Herzegovina) Adriana Basarić	4–6, 3–6
Winner	1.	27 January 2002	Courmayeur, Italy	Hard (i)	(Germany) Stefanie Weis	4–6, 7–6^{(7–3)}, 6–4
Winner	2.	17 February 2002	Bergamo, Italy	Hard (i)	(Italy) Rita Degli Esposti	6–1, 6–2
Runner-up	2.	31 March 2002	Rome–Parioli, Italy	Clay	(Russia) Dinara Safina	7–6^{(7–3)}, 2–6, 3–6
Runner-up	3.	23 June 2002	Gorizia, Italy	Clay	(Spain) Ainhoa Goñi	6–7^{(4–7)}, 1–6
Runner-up	4.	11 August 2002	Rimini, Italy	Clay	(France) Laurence Andretto	5–7, 4–6
Winner	3.	26 January 2003	Grenoble, France	Hard (i)	(France) Sophie Lefèvre	7–5, 7–5
Winner	4.	16 February 2003	Southampton, England	Hard (i)	(Czech Republic) Magdalena Zděnovcová	6–1, 3–0 ret.
Winner	5.	23 February 2003	Redbridge, England	Hard (i)	(Belarus) Olga Barabanschikova	6–3, 6–2
Winner	6.	23 March 2003	Castellón, Spain	Clay	(Slovakia) Ľudmila Cervanová	6–3, 6–3
Winner	7.	2 November 2003	Poitiers, France	Hard (i)	(Italy) Roberta Vinci	6–4, 7–5
Winner	8.	1 March 2009	Biberach Open, Germany	Hard (i)	(Belgium) Kirsten Flipkens	6–1, 6–2
Winner	9.	11 April 2009	Torhout, Belgium	Hard (i)	(Ukraine) Viktoriya Kutuzova	6–1, 6–4
Winner	10.	11 April 2009	Save Cup Mestre, Italy	Hard	(Austria) Yvonne Meusburger	2–6, 6–2, 6–4

=== Doubles (1–0) ===
Outcome	No.	Date	Tournament	Surface	Partner	Opponents	Score
Winner	1.	24 November 2002	Zagreb, Croatia	Hard (i)	(Bosnia and Herzegovina) Mervana Jugić-Salkić	(Croatia) Jelena Kostanić (Croatia) Matea Mezak	6–2, 6–4

== Grand Slam singles performance timeline ==
Key
W	F	SF	QF	#R	RR	Q#	DNQ	A	NH

(W) winner; (F) finalist; (SF) semifinalist; (QF) quarterfinalist; (#R) rounds 4, 3, 2, 1; (RR) round-robin stage; (Q#) qualification round; (DNQ) did not qualify; (A) absent; (NH) not held; (SR) strike rate (events won / competed); (W–L) win–loss record.

Tournament	2003	2004	2005	2006	2007	2008	2009	2010	2011
Australian Open	A	1R	4R	2R	1R	A	1R	2R	1R
French Open	A	1R	2R	3R	A	1R	1R	1R	A
Wimbledon	2R	QF	1R	3R	A	A	1R	2R	A
US Open	1R	1R	1R	1R	A	LQ	LQ	1R	A
