= 2009 Challenge Bell – Doubles =

Doubles
- 2009 Challenge Bell

Final
- Champions: (United States) Vania King; (Czech Republic) Barbora Záhlavová-Strýcová
- Runners-up: (Sweden) Sofia Arvidsson; (France) Séverine Brémond Beltrame
- Score: 6–1, 6–3

Details
- Draw: 16
- Seeds: 4

Events
Singles	Doubles
← 2008 ·	Tournoi de Québec	· 2010 →

Anna-Lena Grönefeld and Vania King were the defending champions, but Grönefeld decided not to participate this year.

King partnered with Barbora Záhlavová-Strýcová and successfully defended her title, defeating Sofia Arvidsson and Séverine Brémond Beltrame 6–1, 6–3 in the final.

== Seeds ==
1. (United States) Vania King / (Czech Republic) Barbora Záhlavová-Strýcová (champions)
2. (United Kingdom) Sarah Borwell / (United States) Raquel Kops-Jones (first round)
3. (United States) Jill Craybas / (Latvia) Līga Dekmeijere (first round)
4. (Russia) Alla Kudryavtseva / (United States) Riza Zalameda (semifinals)

== Draw ==
=== Key ===
- Q = Qualifier
- WC = Wild card
- LL = Lucky loser
- Alt = Alternate
- SE = Special exempt
- PR = Protected ranking
- ITF = ITF entry
- JE = Junior exempt
- w/o = Walkover
- r = Retired
- d = Defaulted
- SR = Special ranking

First round

Quarterfinals

Semifinals

Final

1
- (United States) V King
- (Czech Republic) B Záhlavová-Strýcová
6
6

- (United States) C Fusano
- (United States) M Moulton-Levy
4
1

1
- (United States) V King
- (Czech Republic) B Záhlavová-Strýcová
4
6
[10]

WC
- (Canada) S Dubois
- (Canada) R Marino
5
1

- (Hungary) M Czink
- (South Africa) N Grandin
6
1
[5]

- (Hungary) M Czink
- (South Africa) N Grandin
7
6

1
- (United States) V King
- (Czech Republic) B Záhlavová-Strýcová
6
4
[10]

3
- (United States) J Craybas
- (Latvia) L Dekmeijere
1
6^{5}

- (United States) B Mattek-Sands
- (Canada) A Wozniak
4
6
[5]

- (United States) B Mattek-Sands
- (Canada) A Wozniak
6
7^{7}

- (United States) B Mattek-Sands
- (Canada) A Wozniak
4
6
[10]

- (United States) L Granville
- (Canada) M-È Pelletier
3
7
[12]

- (United States) L Granville
- (Canada) M-È Pelletier
6
3
[7]

- (Australia) M Adamczak
- (United States) S Perry
6
5
[10]

1
- (United States) V King
- (Czech Republic) B Záhlavová-Strýcová
6
6

- (United States) M Brengle
- (United States) L Osterloh
2
2

- (Sweden) S Arvidsson
- (France) S Brémond Beltrame
1
3

- (Brazil) MF Alves
- (Argentina) J Cravero
6
6

- (Brazil) MF Alves
- (Argentina) J Cravero
6
2
[12]

- (United States) K Couts
- (Russia) A Jidkova
2
2

4
- (Russia) A Kudryavtseva
- (United States) R Zalameda
4
6
[14]

4
- (Russia) A Kudryavtseva
- (United States) R Zalameda
6
6

4
- (Russia) A Kudryavtseva
- (United States) R Zalameda
5
2

- (Sweden) S Arvidsson
- (France) S Brémond Beltrame
6
6

- (Sweden) S Arvidsson
- (France) S Brémond Beltrame
7
6

- (Czech Republic) L Šafářová
- (Czech Republic) V Uhlířová
1
3

- (Sweden) S Arvidsson
- (France) S Brémond Beltrame
6
6

- (Italy) C Dentoni
- (Georgia (country)) A Tatishvili
6
6

- (Italy) C Dentoni
- (Georgia (country)) A Tatishvili
4
4

2
- (United Kingdom) S Borwell
- (United States) R Kops-Jones
3
0
