= 2008 Challenge Bell =

- Date: October 27 – November 2
- Edition: 16th
- Category: WTA Tier III
- Draw: 32S (32Q) / 16D (0Q)
- Prize money: US$175,000
- Surface: Carpet – indoors
- Location: Quebec City, Canada
- Venue: PEPS de l'Université Laval

Champions

Singles
- (Russia) Nadia Petrova

Doubles
- (Germany) Anna-Lena Grönefeld / (United States) Vania King
← 2007 ·	Tournoi de Québec	· 2009 →

The 2008 Challenge Bell was a women's tennis tournament played on indoor carpet courts. It was the 16th edition of the Challenge Bell, and was part of the Tier III tournaments of the 2008 WTA Tour. It was held at the PEPS de l'Université Laval in Quebec City, Canada, from October 27 through November 2, 2008. First-seeded Nadia Petrova won the singles title.

== Finals ==
=== Singles ===
(Russia) Nadia Petrova defeated (United States) Bethanie Mattek, 4–6, 6–4, 6–1

- It was Petrova's 2nd and last singles title of the year and the 9th of her career.

=== Doubles ===
(Germany) Anna-Lena Grönefeld / (United States) Vania King defeated (United States) Jill Craybas / (Thailand) Tamarine Tanasugarn, 7–6^{(7–3)}, 6–4

== Entrants ==
=== Seeds ===
Country	Player	Rank^{1}	Seed
RUS	Nadia Petrova	13	1
~~ITA~~	~~Flavia Pennetta~~	~~14~~	~~2~~
AUT	Sybille Bammer	26	3
THA	Tamarine Tanasugarn	36	4
CAN	Aleksandra Wozniak	37	5
USA	Bethanie Mattek	43	6
BLR	Olga Govortsova	46	7
SWE	Sofia Arvidsson	54	8
GER	Sabine Lisicki	56	9

- ^{1} Rankings are as of October 13, 2008

=== Other entrants ===
The following players received wildcards into the singles main draw

- (Canada) Sharon Fichman
- (Canada) Marie-Ève Pelletier
- (Canada) Valérie Tétreault

The following players received entry from the qualifying draw:

- (United States) Carly Gullickson
- (United States) Varvara Lepchenko
- (Canada) Rebecca Marino
- (Russia) Maria Mokh

The following player received entry as a lucky loser:

- (United States) Angela Haynes

=== Withdrawals ===
Before the tournament

- (Italy) Flavia Pennetta (personal reasons)
