= 2010 Challenge Bell – Singles =

Singles
- 2010 Challenge Bell

Final
- Champion: (Austria) Tamira Paszek
- Runner-up: (United States) Bethanie Mattek-Sands
- Score: 7–6^{(8–6)}, 2–6, 7–5

Details
- Draw: 32
- Seeds: 8

Events
| Singles | Doubles |
| ← 2009 · | Tournoi de Québec | · 2011 → |

Melinda Czink was the defending champion, but decided not to participate this year.

Tamira Paszek won the title, defeating Bethanie Mattek-Sands 7–6^{(8–6)}, 2–6, 7–5 in the final.

== Seeds ==
1. (France) Marion Bartoli (second round)
2. (France) Aravane Rezaï (first round)
3. (Czech Republic) Lucie Šafářová (semifinals)
4. (Czech Republic) Barbora Záhlavová-Strýcová (first round)
5. (United States) Melanie Oudin (quarterfinals)
6. (Germany) Julia Görges (second round)
7. (Belarus) Olga Govortsova (first round)
8. (Sweden) Sofia Arvidsson (quarterfinals)

== Draw ==
=== Key ===
- Q = Qualifier
- WC = Wild card
- LL = Lucky loser
- Alt = Alternate
- ITF = ITF entry
- PR = Protected ranking
- SR = Special ranking
- SE = Special exempt
- JE = Junior exempt
- JR = Junior Accelerator Programme entrant
- CO = College Accelerator Programme entrant
- NG = Next Gen Accelerator Program entrant
- w/o = Walkover
- r = Retired
- d = Defaulted

=== Finals ===
Semifinals
(United States) Bethanie Mattek-Sands | 6 | 6
3 | (Czech Republic) Lucie Šafářová | 2 | 1
(United States) Christina McHale | 2 | 2
Q | (Austria) Tamira Paszek | 6 | 6

Final
(United States) Bethanie Mattek-Sands | 6^{6} | 6 | 5
Q | (Austria) Tamira Paszek | 7^{8} | 2 | 7

=== Top half ===
First round
1 | (France) M Bartoli | 6 | 6
Q | (France) S Foretz Gacon | 1 | 1
WC | (Canada) R Marino | 7^{8} | 7^{7}
WC | (Canada) H El Tabakh | 6^{6} | 6^{3}
Q | (United States) I Falconi | 4 | 5
(United States) B Mattek-Sands | 6 | 7
(Czech Republic) A Hlaváčková | 3 | 2
6 | (Germany) J Görges | 6 | 6
3 | (Czech Republic) L Šafářová | 7 | 6
(United States) V Lepchenko | 5 | 3
(United States) S Perry | 6^{3} | 3
(Sweden) J Larsson | 7^{7} | 6
(Australia) A Molik | 6 | 2 | 2
(Georgia (country)) A Tatishvili | 3 | 6 | 6
(United States) A Riske | 2 | 6^{3}
5 | (United States) M Oudin | 6 | 7^{7}

Second round
1 | (France) M Bartoli | 3 | 1
WC | (Canada) R Marino | 6 | 6
(United States) B Mattek-Sands | 6 | 6
6 | (Germany) J Görges | 1 | 4
3 | (Czech Republic) L Šafářová | 6 | 6
(Sweden) J Larsson | 4 | 2
(Georgia (country)) A Tatishvili | 3 | 0
5 | (United States) M Oudin | 6 | 6

Quarterfinals
WC | (Canada) R Marino | 4 | 6^{4}
(United States) B Mattek-Sands | 6 | 7^{7}
3 | (Czech Republic) L Šafářová | 4 | 6 | 6
5 | (United States) M Oudin | 6 | 2 | 4

Semifinals
(United States) B Mattek-Sands | 6 | 6
3 | (Czech Republic) L Šafářová | 2 | 1

=== Bottom half ===
First round
7 | (Belarus) O Govortsova | 4 | 6 | 5
(Canada) S Dubois | 6 | 2 | 7
Q | (United States) A Glatch | 6 | 6
(Germany) S Lisicki | 4 | 2
(United States) L Osterloh | 1 | 6 | 4
(United States) C McHale | 6 | 4 | 6
WC | (Canada) V Tétreault | 6 | 3 | 6
4 | (Czech Republic) B Záhlavová-Strýcová | 3 | 6 | 2
8 | (Sweden) S Arvidsson | 6 | 6
(Netherlands) M Krajicek | 2 | 0
(Croatia) M Lučić | 0 | 6 | 6
(Romania) S Cîrstea | 6 | 1 | 1
Q | (Austria) T Paszek | 6 | 6
PR | (New Zealand) M Erakovic | 0 | 4
(United States) J Craybas | 6 | 3 | 7^{7}
2 | (France) A Rezaï | 3 | 6 | 6^{3}

Second round
(Canada) S Dubois | 5 | 2
Q | (United States) A Glatch | 7 | 6
(United States) C McHale | 6 | 6
WC | (Canada) V Tétreault | 4 | 3
8 | (Sweden) S Arvidsson | 5 | 6 | 6
(Croatia) M Lučić | 7 | 4 | 2
Q | (Austria) T Paszek | 6 | 6
(United States) J Craybas | 3 | 2

Quarterfinals
Q | (United States) A Glatch | 3 | 1
(United States) C McHale | 6 | 6
8 | (Sweden) S Arvidsson | 3 | 4
Q | (Austria) T Paszek | 6 | 6

Semifinals
(United States) C McHale | 2 | 2
Q | (Austria) T Paszek | 6 | 6
