= 2008 Challenge Bell – Doubles =

Doubles
- 2008 Challenge Bell

Final
- Champions: (Germany) Anna-Lena Grönefeld; (United States) Vania King
- Runners-up: (United States) Jill Craybas; (Thailand) Tamarine Tanasugarn
- Score: 7–6^{(7–3)}, 6–4

Details
- Draw: 16
- Seeds: 4

Events
Singles	Doubles
← 2007 ·	Tournoi de Québec	· 2009 →

Christina Fusano and Raquel Kops-Jones were the defending champions, but decided not to compete together. Fusano partnered with Angela Haynes, but lost in the first round to Jill Craybas and Tamarine Tanasugarn. Kops-Jones partnered with Abigail Spears, but lost in the semifinals to Anna-Lena Grönefeld and Vania King.

Grönefeld and King went on to win the title, defeating Craybas and Tanasugarn 7–6^{(7–3)}, 6–4 in the final.

== Seeds ==
1. (France) Nathalie Dechy / (United States) Bethanie Mattek (first round)
2. (Germany) Anna-Lena Grönefeld / (United States) Vania King (champions)
3. (United States) Raquel Kops-Jones / (United States) Abigail Spears (semifinals)
4. (United States) Jill Craybas / (Thailand) Tamarine Tanasugarn (final)

== Draw ==
=== Key ===
- Q = Qualifier
- WC = Wild card
- LL = Lucky loser
- Alt = Alternate
- SE = Special exempt
- PR = Protected ranking
- ITF = ITF entry
- JE = Junior exempt
- w/o = Walkover
- r = Retired
- d = Defaulted
- SR = Special ranking

First round

Quarterfinals

Semifinals

Final

1
- (France) N Dechy
- (United States) B Mattek
6^{7}
5

- (Canada) M-È Pelletier
- (South Africa) C Scheepers
7^{9}
7

- (Canada) M-È Pelletier
- (South Africa) C Scheepers
0
7^{10}
[12]

WC
- (Italy) M Santangelo
- (Canada) A Wozniak
4
3

Alt
- (Paraguay) R de los Ríos
- (United States) S Perry
6
6^{8}
[10]

Alt
- (Paraguay) R de los Ríos
- (United States) S Perry
6
6

- (Canada) M-È Pelletier
- (South Africa) C Scheepers
6^{5}
1

4
- (United States) J Craybas
- (Thailand) T Tanasugarn
4
7
[10]

4
- (United States) J Craybas
- (Thailand) T Tanasugarn
7^{7}
6

- (United States) C Fusano
- (United States) A Haynes
6
5
[8]

4
- (United States) J Craybas
- (Thailand) T Tanasugarn
0
6
[10]

- (Latvia) L Dekmeijere
- (Russia) A Jidkova
2
7^{7}
[5]

- (United States) J Ditty
- (United States) C Gullickson
6
3
[2]

- (United States) J Ditty
- (United States) C Gullickson
6
6^{1}
[10]

4
- (United States) J Craybas
- (Thailand) T Tanasugarn
6^{3}
4

- (Poland) U Radwańska
- (Kazakhstan) G Voskoboeva
5
6
[10]

2
- (Germany) A-L Grönefeld
- (United States) V King
7^{7}
6

- (Romania) E Gallovits
- (Belarus) O Govortsova
7
3
[5]

- (Poland) U Radwańska
- (Kazakhstan) G Voskoboeva
2
5

- (Argentina) J Cravero
- (Argentina) B Jozami
6^{2}
4

3
- (United States) R Kops-Jones
- (United States) A Spears
6
7

3
- (United States) R Kops-Jones
- (United States) A Spears
7^{7}
6

3
- (United States) R Kops-Jones
- (United States) A Spears
7^{7}
3
[5]

- (United Kingdom) S Borwell
- (United States) C Nagle
6
6

2
- (Germany) A-L Grönefeld
- (United States) V King
6^{3}
6
[10]

- (Sweden) S Arvidsson
- (Hungary) M Czink
4
2

- (United Kingdom) S Borwell
- (United States) C Nagle
6^{5}
6^{2}

- (France) S Brémond
- (Canada) S Dubois
2
2

2
- (Germany) A-L Grönefeld
- (United States) V King
7^{7}
7^{7}

2
- (Germany) A-L Grönefeld
- (United States) V King
6
6
