= 2009 Challenge Bell =

- Date: September 14–20
- Edition: 17th
- Category: WTA International
- Draw: 32S (32Q) / 16D (0Q)
- Prize money: US$220,000
- Surface: Carpet – indoors
- Location: Quebec City, Canada
- Venue: PEPS de l'Université Laval

Champions

Singles
- (Hungary) Melinda Czink

Doubles
- (United States) Vania King / (Czech Republic) Barbora Záhlavová-Strýcová
← 2008 ·	Tournoi de Québec	· 2010 →

The 2009 Challenge Bell was a women's tennis tournament played on indoor carpet courts. It was the 17th edition of the Challenge Bell, and was part of the WTA International tournaments of the 2009 WTA Tour. It was held at the PEPS de l'Université Laval in Quebec City, Canada, from September 14 through September 20, 2009. Fifth-seeded Melinda Czink won the singles title.

== Finals ==
=== Singles ===
(Hungary) Melinda Czink defeated (Czech Republic) Lucie Šafářová, 4–6, 6–3, 7–5

- It was Czink's only singles title of her career.

=== Doubles ===
(United States) Vania King / (Czech Republic) Barbora Záhlavová-Strýcová defeated (Sweden) Sofia Arvidsson / (France) Séverine Brémond Beltrame, 6–1, 6–3

== Entrants ==
=== Seeds ===
Country	Player	Rank^{1}	Seed
RUS	Nadia Petrova	13	1
~~GER~~	~~Sabine Lisicki~~	~~25~~	~~2~~
CAN	Aleksandra Wozniak	39	3
CZE	Lucie Šafářová	48	4
HUN	Melinda Czink	51	5
USA	Jill Craybas	75	6
USA	Varvara Lepchenko	84	7
GER	Julia Görges	92	8

- ^{1} Rankings are as of August 31, 2009

=== Other entrants ===
The following players received wildcards into the singles main draw

- (Canada) Heidi El Tabakh
- (Canada) Rebecca Marino
- (United States) Bethanie Mattek-Sands

The following players received entry from the qualifying draw:

- (United States) Mallory Cecil
- (United States) Lilia Osterloh
- (Switzerland) Amra Sadiković
- (Georgia (country)) Anna Tatishvili

The following player received entry as a lucky loser:

- (Russia) Olga Puchkova

=== Withdrawals ===
Before the tournament

- (Germany) Sabine Lisicki (ankle injury)
