= 2008 Challenge Bell – Singles =

Singles
- 2008 Challenge Bell

Final
- Champion: (Russia) Nadia Petrova
- Runner-up: (United States) Bethanie Mattek
- Score: 4–6, 6–4, 6–1

Details
- Draw: 32
- Seeds: 8

Events
Singles	Doubles
- Tournoi de Québec

Lindsay Davenport was the defending champion, but decided not to participate this year.

Nadia Petrova won the title, defeating Bethanie Mattek 4–6, 6–4, 6–1 in the final.

== Seeds ==
1. (Russia) Nadia Petrova (champion)
2. (Italy) Flavia Pennetta (withdrew due to personal reasons)
3. (Austria) Sybille Bammer (first round)
4. (Thailand) Tamarine Tanasugarn (first round)
5. (Canada) Aleksandra Wozniak (semifinals)
6. (United States) Bethanie Mattek (final)
7. (Belarus) Olga Govortsova (second round)
8. (Sweden) Sofia Arvidsson (first round)
9. (Germany) Sabine Lisicki (first round)

== Draw ==
Key

- Q = Qualifier
- WC = Wild card
- LL = Lucky loser
- Alt = Alternate
- ITF = ITF entry
- PR = Protected ranking
- SR = Special ranking
- SE = Special exempt
- JE = Junior exempt
- JR = Junior Accelerator Programme entrant
- CO = College Accelerator Programme entrant
- NG = Next Gen Accelerator Program entrant
- w/o = Walkover
- r = Retired
- d = Defaulted

=== Finals ===
Semifinals
1	(Russia) Nadia Petrova	6	6
LL	(United States) Angela Haynes	1	3
5	(Canada) Aleksandra Wozniak	6^{4}	3
6	(United States) Bethanie Mattek	7^{7}	6

Final
1	(Russia) Nadia Petrova	4	6	6
6	(United States) Bethanie Mattek	6	4	1

=== Top half ===
First round
1	(Russia) N Petrova	6	6
Q	(Russia) M Mokh	1	2
Q	(United States) V Lepchenko	6	6
(Paraguay) R de los Ríos	1	3
(Poland) U Radwańska	6^{1}	2
(United States) J Ditty	7^{7}	6
(Hungary) M Czink	6	5	6
9	(Germany) S Lisicki	2	7	3
4	(Thailand) T Tanasugarn	2	6^{4}
(France) S Brémond	6	7^{7}
LL	(United States) A Haynes	6	4	6
(Canada) S Dubois	3	6	2
(Germany) A-L Grönefeld	3	1
(France) N Dechy	6	6
(United States) V King	1	6	4
7	(Belarus) O Govortsova	6	2	6

Second round
1	(Russia) N Petrova	6	6
Q	(United States) V Lepchenko	2	4
(United States) J Ditty	1	1
(Hungary) M Czink	6	6
(France) S Brémond	2	4
LL	(United States) A Haynes	6	6
(France) N Dechy	6	7
7	(Belarus) O Govortsova	1	5

Quarterfinals
1	(Russia) N Petrova	6	6
(Hungary) M Czink	1	4
LL	(United States) A Haynes	2	7^{7}	6
(France) N Dechy	6	6^{2}	3

Semifinals
1	(Russia) N Petrova	6	6
LL	(United States) A Haynes	1	3

=== Bottom half ===
First round
8	(Sweden) S Arvidsson	3	2
(Kazakhstan) G Voskoboeva	6	6
(United States) J Craybas	6^{4}	1
Q	(Canada) R Marino	7^{7}	6
(Romania) IR Olaru	6^{6}	1
Q	(United States) C Gullickson	7^{8}	6
(Romania) E Gallovits	4	3
5	(Canada) A Wozniak	6	6
6	(United States) B Mattek	6	6
WC	(Canada) S Fichman	3	3
WC	(Canada) V Tétreault	6	7
(France) M Johansson	1	5
WC	(Canada) M-È Pelletier	3	1
(Russia) O Puchkova	6	6
(United States) M Oudin	6	3	7
3	(Austria) S Bammer	4	6	5

Second round
(Kazakhstan) G Voskoboeva	6	6
Q	(Canada) R Marino	1	3
Q	(United States) C Gullickson	3	2
5	(Canada) A Wozniak	6	6
6	(United States) B Mattek	7^{7}	3	7^{7}
WC	(Canada) V Tétreault	6^{4}	6	6^{1}
(Russia) O Puchkova	1	6^{3}
(United States) M Oudin	6	7^{7}

Quarterfinals
(Kazakhstan) G Voskoboeva	2	2
5	(Canada) A Wozniak	6	6
6	(United States) B Mattek	7^{9}	6
(United States) M Oudin	6^{7}	1

Semifinals
5	(Canada) A Wozniak	6^{4}	3
6	(United States) B Mattek	7^{7}	6
