= 2010 Challenge Bell =

- Date: September 13–19
- Edition: 18th
- Category: WTA International
- Draw: 32S (32Q) / 16D (0Q)
- Prize money: US$220,000
- Surface: Carpet – indoors
- Location: Quebec City, Canada
- Venue: PEPS de l'Université Laval

Champions

Singles
- (Austria) Tamira Paszek

Doubles
- (Sweden) Sofia Arvidsson / (Sweden) Johanna Larsson
← 2009 ·	Tournoi de Québec	· 2011 →

The 2010 Challenge Bell was a women's tennis tournament played on indoor carpet courts. It was the 18th edition of the Challenge Bell, and was part of the WTA International tournaments of the 2010 WTA Tour. It took place at the PEPS de l'Université Laval in Quebec City, Canada, from September 13 through September 19, 2010. Unseeded Tamira Paszek, who entered the main draw as a qualifier, won the singles title.

== Finals ==
=== Singles ===
(Austria) Tamira Paszek defeated (United States) Bethanie Mattek-Sands, 7–6^{(8–6)}, 2–6, 7–5

- It was Paszek's only singles title of the year and the 2nd of her career.

=== Doubles ===
(Sweden) Sofia Arvidsson / (Sweden) Johanna Larsson defeated (United States) Bethanie Mattek-Sands / (Czech Republic) Barbora Záhlavová-Strýcová, 6–1, 2–6, [10–6]

== Entrants ==
=== Seeds ===
Country	Player	Rank^{1}	Seed
FRA	Marion Bartoli	14	1
FRA	Aravane Rezaï	20	2
CZE	Lucie Šafářová	28	3
CZE	Barbora Záhlavová-Strýcová	39	4
USA	Melanie Oudin	43	5
GER	Julia Görges	44	6
BLR	Olga Govortsova	49	7
SWE	Sofia Arvidsson	55	8

- ^{1} Rankings are as of August 30, 2010

=== Other entrants ===
The following players received wildcards into the singles main draw:

- (Canada) Heidi El Tabakh
- (Canada) Rebecca Marino
- (Canada) Valérie Tétreault

The following player entered the singles main draw with a protected ranking:

- (New Zealand) Marina Erakovic

The following players received entry from the qualifying draw:

- (United States) Irina Falconi
- (France) Stéphanie Foretz Gacon
- (United States) Alexa Glatch
- (Austria) Tamira Paszek
