= 2009 Challenge Bell – Singles =

Singles
- 2009 Challenge Bell

Final
- Champion: (Hungary) Melinda Czink
- Runner-up: (Czech Republic) Lucie Šafářová
- Score: 4–6, 6–3, 7–5

Details
- Draw: 32
- Seeds: 8

Events
Singles	Doubles
- Tournoi de Québec

Nadia Petrova was the defending champion, but she retired, due to a viral illness, in the quarterfinals against Melinda Czink.

Czink went on to win her maiden WTA singles title, defeating Lucie Šafářová 4–6, 6–3, 7–5 in the final.

== Seeds ==
1. (Russia) Nadia Petrova (quarterfinals, retired due to viral illness)
2. (Germany) Sabine Lisicki (withdrew due to ankle injury)
3. (Canada) Aleksandra Wozniak (semifinals)
4. (Czech Republic) Lucie Šafářová (final)
5. (Hungary) Melinda Czink (champion)
6. (United States) Jill Craybas (second round)
7. (United States) Varvara Lepchenko (first round)
8. (Germany) Julia Görges (semifinals)

== Draw ==
Key

- Q = Qualifier
- WC = Wild card
- LL = Lucky loser
- Alt = Alternate
- ITF = ITF entry
- PR = Protected ranking
- SR = Special ranking
- SE = Special exempt
- JE = Junior exempt
- JR = Junior Accelerator Programme entrant
- CO = College Accelerator Programme entrant
- NG = Next Gen Accelerator Program entrant
- w/o = Walkover
- r = Retired
- d = Defaulted

=== Finals ===
Semifinals
5	(Hungary) Melinda Czink	6	6
3	(Canada) Aleksandra Wozniak	3	3
4	(Czech Republic) Lucie Šafářová	6	6
8	(Germany) Julia Görges	3	2

Final
5	(Hungary) Melinda Czink	4	6	7
4	(Czech Republic) Lucie Šafářová	6	3	5

=== Top half ===
First round
1	(Russia) N Petrova	6	6
(United States) C Gullickson	2	0
Q	(United States) M Cecil	5	3
(United States) M Brengle	7	6
WC	(Canada) H El Tabakh	0^{r}
(France) S Brémond Beltrame	5
(Australia) M Adamczak	3	6^{1}
5	(Hungary) M Czink	6	7^{7}
3	(Canada) A Wozniak	6	6
(Italy) C Dentoni	2	0
(Russia) R Kulikova	6	6
(Argentina) J Cravero	4	2
(United Kingdom) K O'Brien	1	4
(Russia) A Kudryavtseva	6	6
(United States) L Granville	0	1
6	(United States) J Craybas	6	6

Second round
1	(Russia) N Petrova	6	6
(United States) M Brengle	3	2
(France) S Brémond Beltrame	4	3
5	(Hungary) M Czink	6	6
3	(Canada) A Wozniak	6	7
(Russia) R Kulikova	2	5
(Russia) A Kudryavtseva	7	6
6	(United States) J Craybas	5	2

Quarterfinals
1	(Russia) N Petrova	6^{4}	0^{r}
5	(Hungary) M Czink	7^{7}	0
3	(Canada) A Wozniak	6	6
(Russia) A Kudryavtseva	1	1

Semifinals
5	(Hungary) M Czink	6	6
3	(Canada) A Wozniak	3	3

=== Bottom half ===
First round
7	(United States) V Lepchenko	4	5
WC	(United States) B Mattek-Sands	6	7
(United States) V King	7	6
Q	(Georgia (country)) A Tatishvili	5	2
(Canada) V Tétreault	6	6
(Czech Republic) B Záhlavová-Strýcová	2	1
(Canada) S Dubois	1	3
4	(Czech Republic) L Šafářová	6	6
8	(Germany) J Görges	6	7
(Sweden) S Arvidsson	3	5
(United States) L Albanese	4	3
WC	(Canada) R Marino	6	6
(United States) S Perry	1	6	2
Q	(United States) L Osterloh	6	3	6
Q	(Switzerland) A Sadiković	6	6
LL	(Russia) O Puchkova	4	3

Second round
WC	(United States) B Mattek-Sands	6	6
(United States) V King	3	3
(Canada) V Tétreault	2	2
4	(Czech Republic) L Šafářová	6	6
8	(Germany) J Görges	6	6
WC	(Canada) R Marino	2	3
Q	(United States) L Osterloh	6	2	6
Q	(Switzerland) A Sadiković	3	6	2

Quarterfinals
WC	(United States) B Mattek-Sands	3	4
4	(Czech Republic) L Šafářová	6	6
8	(Germany) J Görges	6	6
Q	(United States) L Osterloh	2	4

Semifinals
4	(Czech Republic) L Šafářová	6	6
8	(Germany) J Görges	3	2
