= Mallory Cecil =

American tennis player

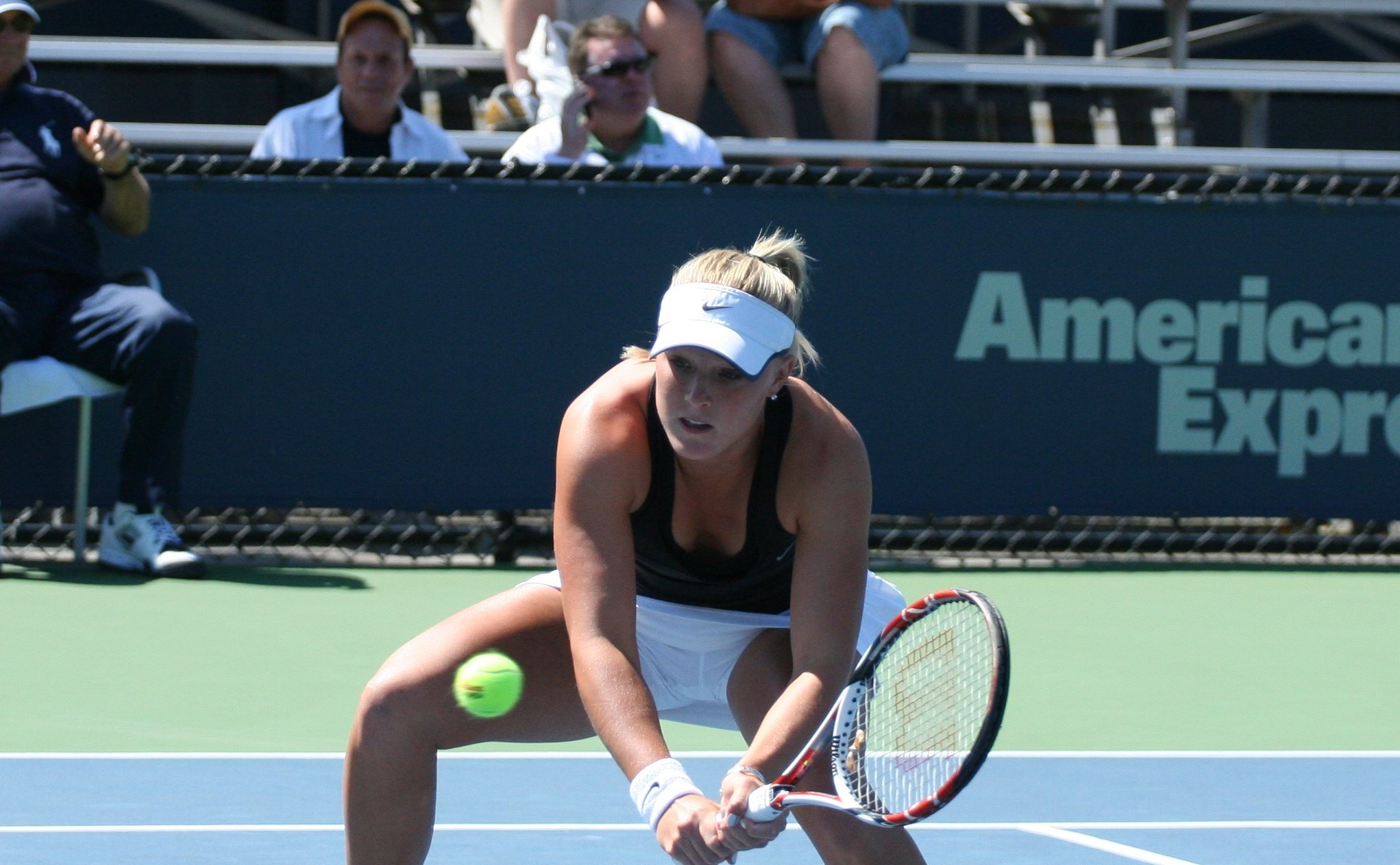
- Full name: Mallory Anne Cecil
- Country (sports): United States
- Born: July 18, 1990 (age 35) Spartanburg, South Carolina, U.S.
- Plays: Right-handed
- College: Duke
- Prize money: $61,773

Singles
- Career record: 62–51
- Highest ranking: No. 365 (May 3, 2010)

Grand Slam singles results
- US Open: 1R (2009)

Doubles
- Career record: 24–19
- Highest ranking: No. 350 (April 12, 2010)

Grand Slam doubles results
- US Open: 1R (2008)

Grand Slam mixed doubles results
- US Open: 1R (2009)

Mallory Anne Cecil (born July 18, 1990) is a former professional tennis player from the United States.

== Biography ==
A right-handed player from Spartanburg, South Carolina, Cecil trained at the IMG Academy in Florida, where she was coached by Nick Bollettieri. Her junior career included grand slam appearances and she won the doubles title at the 2007 Orange Bowl, partnering Melanie Oudin.

=== College ===
While at Duke, she received the Honda Sports Award as the nation's best female tennis player in 2009, having won the 2009 NCAA Division I Tennis Championships as a freshman, and winning all six of her matches in straight sets. Overall, she compiled a 32–4 record in her debut season with the Duke Blue Devils as their top singles player, leading her to leave Duke for what would prove to be a brief professional career.

Cecil would eventually return to Duke to finish her degree, and later completed a postgraduate degree at Durham University Business School in England, where she represented the Durham University tennis team and earned a half palatinate.

=== Tennis career ===
Cecil had her breakthrough on the WTA Tour when she qualified for the main draw of the 2008 Pilot Pen Tennis tournament in New Haven, losing in the first round to Sara Errani, whom she had earlier beaten in qualifying. Errani, who was ranked in the world's top 50, had made it into the main draw as a lucky loser and only narrowly beat Cecil in their main draw match, which was decided by a third set tiebreak. She won two ITF singles titles in 2008 at Hilton Head Island and Sumter, both in her home state of South Carolina.

As the reigning NCAA champion Cecil earned a wildcard into the singles main draw of the 2009 US Open and lost in the first round to Tathiana Garbin.

Cecil qualified for the main draw of the 2009 Challenge Bell in Quebec City and made further WTA Tour appearances as a wildcard at the Charleston Open in both 2009 and 2010. In February 2010 she reached the final of the ITF tournament in Sutton after coming through qualifying, but lost to Andrea Hlaváčková in three sets. At the Charleston tournament in April she tore the acetabular labrum in her hip and made the decision to leave professional tennis and return to Duke to further her studies.

== ITF finals ==
=== Singles (2–1) ===
$25,000 tournaments
$10,000 tournaments

| Outcome | No. | Date | Tournament | Surface | Opponent | Score in the final |
|---|---|---|---|---|---|---|
| Winner | 1. | May 2008 | Sumter | Hard | (United States) Theresa Logar | 3–6, 7–6, 6–4 |
| Winner | 2. | June 2008 | Hilton Head | Hard | (United States) Theresa Logar | 6–2, 3–6, 6–2 |
| Runner-Up | 1. | February 2010 | Sutton | Indoor | (Czech Republic) Andrea Hlaváčková | 1–6 6–4 4–6 |

== Personal ==
Cecil is employed at Universal Tennis as Director of Product Operations.
