= Maria Mokh =

Russian tennis player

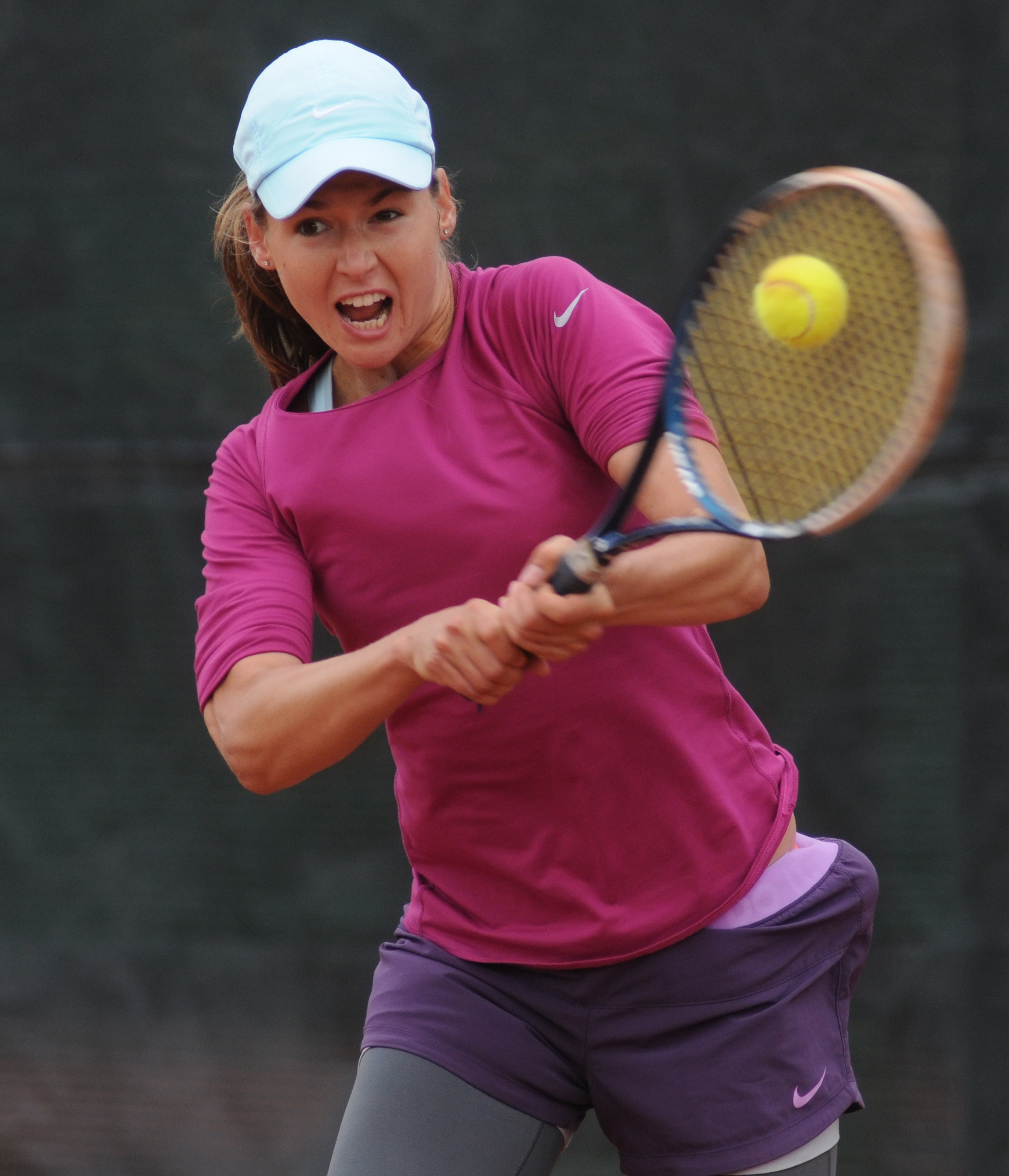
- Country (sports): Russia
- Born: 4 November 1990 (age 34)
- Plays: Right-handed (two-handed backhand)
- Prize money: $33,608

Singles
- Career record: 120–91
- Career titles: 1 ITF
- Highest ranking: No. 359 (10 August 2009)

Doubles
- Career record: 46–35
- Career titles: 2 ITF
- Highest ranking: No. 435 (14 July 2008)

Maria Mokh (born 4 November 1990) is a Russian former professional tennis player.

She has career-high WTA rankings of 359 in singles, achieved on 10 August 2009, and 435 in doubles, attained on 14 July 2008.

Mokh reached two singles finals on the ITF Circuit posting a 1–1 record. Additionally, she entered eight doubles finals on the ITF Circuit with a record of 2–6.

== Career ==
Mokh made her WTA Tour debut at the 2008 Bell Challenge in Quebec City, Canada where she advanced through the qualifying rounds to reach her first main draw. In qualifying, she defeated Jennifer Elie 6–4, 6–2, Mara Santangelo 6–4, 3–6, 7–6^{(8)} and Angela Haynes 6–4, 6–3. In the first round, she lost to the top seed and eventual champion, Nadia Petrova, in straight sets 1–6, 2–6.

In 2009, she participated in the European Universities Tennis Championships competing for Moscow State University of Economics, Statistics, and Informatics, where they finished in second place in the women's bracket, runners-up to the team from Czech Republic representing the Technical University of Ostrava.

== ITF Circuit finals ==
=== Singles: 2 (1 title, 1 runner-up) ===
Legend $25,000 tournaments $10,000 tournaments	Finals by surface Hard (1–0) Clay (0–1)

Result	W–L	Date	Tournament	Tier	Surface	Opponent	Score
Win	1–0	Jun 2009	ITF Gausdal, Norway	10,000	Hard	(France) Victoria Larrière	5–7, 6–3, 7–6^{(5)}
Loss	1–1	Jul 2012	ITF Prokuplje, Serbia	10,000	Clay	(Russia) Victoria Kan	1–6, 2–6

=== Doubles: 8 (2 titles, 6 runner-ups) ===
Legend $25,000 tournaments $10,000 tournaments	Finals by surface Hard (1–3) Clay (1–3)

Result	W–L	Date	Tournament	Tier	Surface	Partner	Opponents	Score
Win	1–0	Jul 2011	ITF Izmir, Turkey	10,000	Clay	(Russia) Anastasia Mukhametova	(Russia) Alexandra Romanova (Czech Republic) Monika Tumova	6–1, 6–3
Loss	1–1	Aug 2011	ITF Vinkovci, Croatia	10,000	Clay	(Germany) Lisa Brinkmann	(Croatia) Silvia Njirić (Croatia) Karla Popović	2–6, 3–6
Loss	1–2	Apr 2012	ITF Antalya, Turkey	10,000	Hard	(Romania) Ana Bogdan	(Georgia (country)) Oksana Kalashnikova (Georgia (country)) Sofia Kvatsabaia	4–6, 4–6
Loss	1–3	Jun 2012	ITF Nis, Serbia	10,000	Clay	(North Macedonia) Lina Gjorcheska	(Turkey) Hülya Esen (Turkey) Lütfiye Esen	6–3, 6–7^{(2)}, [6–10]
Loss	1–4	Oct 2012	ITF Stockholm, Sweden	10,000	Hard	(Estonia) Eva Paalma	(Sweden) Donika Bashota (Latvia) Jeļena Ostapenko	6–7^{(4)}, 1–6
Loss	1–5	May 2013	ITF Bastad, Sweden	10,000	Clay	(Belgium) Ysaline Bonaventure	(Netherlands) Cindy Burger (Serbia) Milana Spremo	1–6, 4–6
Win	2–5	Oct 2013	ITF Stockholm, Sweden	10,000	Hard	(Estonia) Eva Paalma	(Sweden) Emma Ek (Slovakia) Zuzana Luknarová	6–2, 6–2
Loss	2–6	Jul 2014	ITF Istanbul, Turkey	10,000	Hard	(Sweden) Anette Munozova	(Turkey) Başak Eraydın (Turkey) Melis Sezer	6–2, 0–6, [7–10]
