= 2010 Challenge Bell – Doubles =

Doubles
- 2010 Challenge Bell

Final
- Champions: (Sweden) Sofia Arvidsson (Sweden) Johanna Larsson
- Runners-up: (United States) Bethanie Mattek-Sands (Czech Republic) Barbora Záhlavová-Strýcová
- Score: 6–1, 2–6, [10–6]

Details
- Draw: 16
- Seeds: 4

Events
| Singles | Doubles |
- Tournoi de Québec

Vania King and Barbora Záhlavová-Strýcová were the defending champions, but King decided not to participate this year.

Záhlavová-Strýcová partnered with Bethanie Mattek-Sands, but lost to Sofia Arvidsson and Johanna Larsson 6–1, 2–6, [10–6] in the final.

== Seeds ==
1. (United States) Bethanie Mattek-Sands / (Czech Republic) Barbora Záhlavová-Strýcová (final)
2. (United States) Carly Gullickson / (United States) Abigail Spears (quarterfinals)
3. (Czech Republic) Andrea Hlaváčková / (Netherlands) Michaëlla Krajicek (first round)
4. (United Kingdom) Sarah Borwell / (United States) Raquel Kops-Jones (first round)

== Draw ==
Key

- Q = Qualifier
- WC = Wild card
- LL = Lucky loser
- Alt = Alternate
- ITF = ITF entry
- PR = Protected ranking
- SR = Special ranking
- SE = Special exempt
- JE = Junior exempt
- JR = Junior Accelerator Programme entrant
- CO = College Accelerator Programme entrant
- NG = Next Gen Accelerator Program entrant
- w/o = Walkover
- r = Retired
- d = Defaulted

First round
1 | (United States) B Mattek-Sands (Czech Republic) B Záhlavová-Strýcová | 6 | 7^{10}
(Australia) A Molik (Canada) M-È Pelletier | 3 | 6^{8}
(Russia) E Bovina (Latvia) L Dekmeijere | 6 | 2 | [10]
(United States) M Oudin (United States) R Zalameda | 3 | 6 | [12]
4 | (United Kingdom) S Borwell (United States) R Kops-Jones | 1 | 4
(France) S Foretz Gacon (Germany) K Wörle | 6 | 6
WC | (Canada) H El Tabakh (Canada) R Marino | 6 | 4 | [4]
(New Zealand) M Erakovic (Belarus) O Govortsova | 4 | 6 | [10]
WC | (Canada) S Dubois (Canada) V Tétreault | 2 | 3
(United States) J Craybas (Germany) J Görges | 6 | 6
(United States) L Osterloh (Georgia (country)) A Tatishvili | 6 | 6
3 | (Czech Republic) A Hlaváčková (Netherlands) M Krajicek | 3 | 1
(Sweden) S Arvidsson (Sweden) J Larsson | 6 | 6
(United States) L Lee-Waters (United States) M Moulton-Levy | 2 | 1
(Romania) S Cîrstea (Czech Republic) L Šafářová | 6^{4} | 4
2 | (United States) C Gullickson (United States) A Spears | 7^{7} | 6

Quarterfinals
1 | (United States) B Mattek-Sands (Czech Republic) B Záhlavová-Strýcová | 7^{8} | 6
(United States) M Oudin (United States) R Zalameda | 6^{6} | 3
(France) S Foretz Gacon (Germany) K Wörle | 2 | 6 | [10]
(New Zealand) M Erakovic (Belarus) O Govortsova | 6 | 2 | [7]
(United States) J Craybas (Germany) J Görges | 4 | 0^{r}
(United States) L Osterloh (Georgia (country)) A Tatishvili | 1 | 0
(Sweden) S Arvidsson (Sweden) J Larsson | 7^{7} | 6
2 | (United States) C Gullickson (United States) A Spears | 6^{4} | 3

Semifinals
1 | (United States) B Mattek-Sands (Czech Republic) B Záhlavová-Strýcová | 6 | 6
(France) S Foretz Gacon (Germany) K Wörle | 1 | 2
(United States) L Osterloh (Georgia (country)) A Tatishvili | 1 | 6 | [9]
(Sweden) S Arvidsson (Sweden) J Larsson | 6 | 3 | [11]

Final
1 | (United States) B Mattek-Sands (Czech Republic) B Záhlavová-Strýcová | 1 | 6 | [6]
(Sweden) S Arvidsson (Sweden) J Larsson | 6 | 2 | [10]
