= Melinda Czink =

Hungarian tennis player

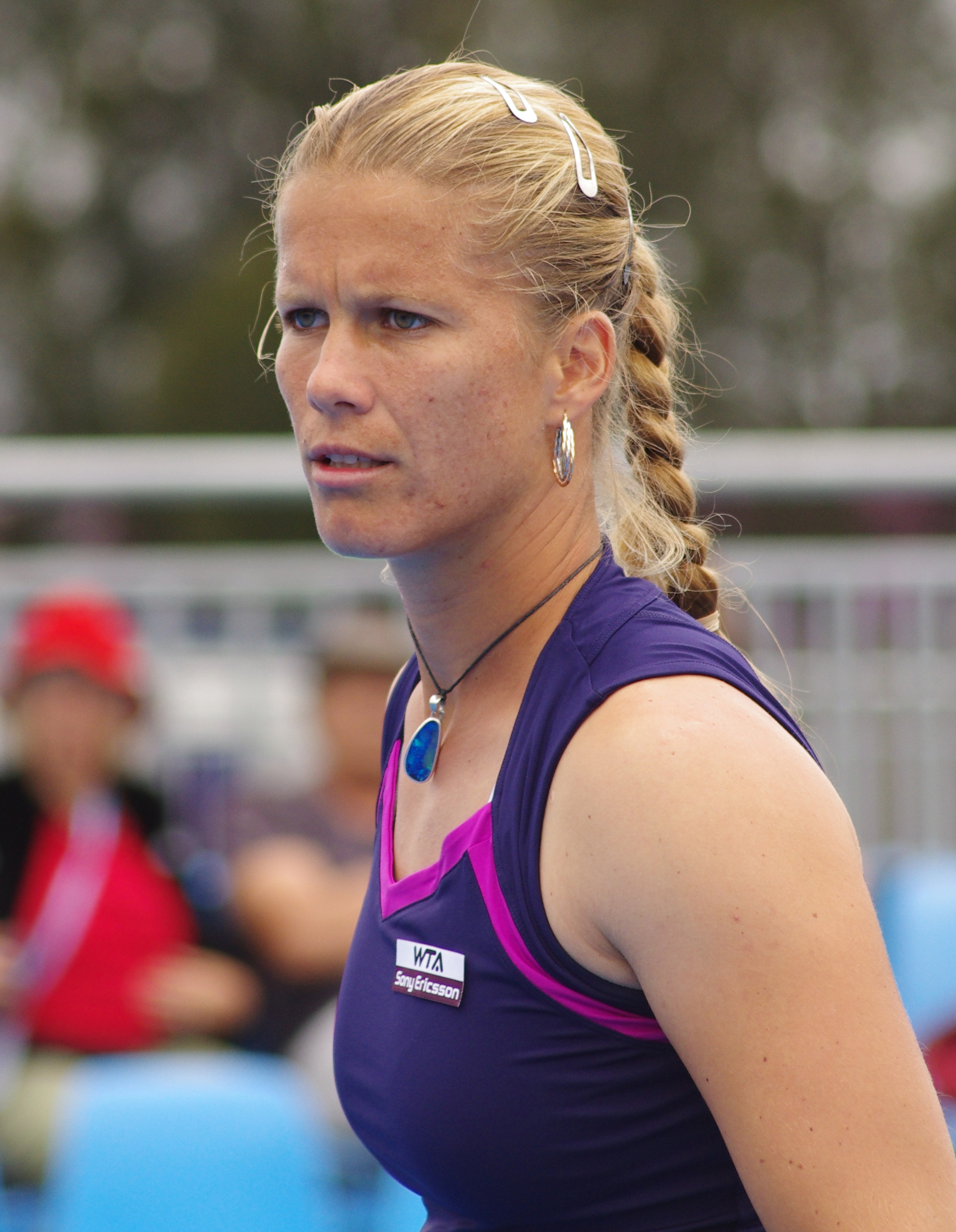
- Czink in 2012
- Country (sports): Hungary
- Residence: Budapest, Hungary/ Delray Beach, Florida, U.S.
- Born: 22 October 1982 (age 42); Budapest
- Height: 1.78 m (5 ft 10 in)
- Turned pro: 2000
- Retired: 2014
- Plays: Left-handed (two-handed backhand)
- Prize money: US$ 1,504,389

Singles
- Career record: 437–325
- Career titles: 1 WTA, 20 ITF
- Highest ranking: No. 37 (21 September 2009)

Grand Slam singles results
- Australian Open: 2R (2004, 2009)
- French Open: 3R (2009)
- Wimbledon: 3R (2011)
- US Open: 3R (2003)

Doubles
- Career record: 126–147
- Career titles: 0 WTA, 10 ITF
- Highest ranking: No. 78 (10 May 2010)

Melinda Czink (born 22 October 1982) is a former professional tennis player from Hungary. On 21 September 2009, she reached her career-high singles ranking of world No. 37.

Czink reached two WTA Tour singles finals. In 2005, she lost to Ana Ivanovic in Canberra. In 2009, she defeated Lucie Šafářová in Quebec City for her first and only WTA Tour title. On the ITF Circuit, she won 20 singles and nine doubles titles.

== Tennis career ==
=== 2000–2008 ===
She played her first tournament at Budapest as a wildcard in 2000, and first entered the top 100 in 2003. Czink won several singles and doubles titles on the ITF Circuit.

At the 2005 Canberra International, Czink lost in the final round of qualifying to Ana Ivanovic, but after being selected as a lucky loser, she went on to reach her first-ever WTA Tour singles finals which she lost to Ivanovic again.

=== 2009 ===
She reached the top 50 and won her first title at Quebec City; as the fifth seed, she defeated Aleksandra Wozniak in the semifinal, and Lucie Šafářová in the final. She also reached one semifinal and four quarterfinals during the season. At the end of the year, she played at the Tournament of Champions in Bali where she lost to Aravane Rezaï and to Sabine Lisicki in the round-robin stage.

=== 2010 ===
Czink started the year at the Brisbane International in Australia as seventh seed. She defeated Lucie Hradecká in the first round, and Barbora Záhlavová-Strýcová in the second, both in three sets; in the quarterfinals, she lost to Justine Henin. She reached the doubles final with Arantxa Parra Santonja; they lost to Andrea Hlaváčková and Lucie Hradecká. Next, she played the Hobart International, where she lost to Gisela Dulko in the first round, in straight sets. In the Australian Open, she lost in the first round to Stefanie Vögele.

=== 2011 ===
Czink missed the Australian Open. She won two ITF events in Dothan, Alabama, and Indian Harbour Beach, before returning to play with a protected rank at Wimbledon. As the lowest-ranked player in the major tournament at world No. 262, she drew tenth seed Samantha Stosur in the first round. She recorded the biggest win of her career by upsetting the Australian, 6–3, 6–4. She then beat Anastasiya Yakimova of Belarus in two sets. In the third round, Czink lost for the first time to the 20th-seed, Peng Shuai.

=== 2012 ===
Czink began the season at the Brisbane International, but lost in the first round to qualifier Vania King, in straight sets. Following this, she continued her hardcourt season at the Sydney International. In the first round of the main draw, she was defeated by Chanelle Scheepers. At the Australian Open, Czink lost in her second qualifying match.

Her next tournament was the Mexican Open. In the first round, she defeated Canadian Stéphanie Dubois in straight sets, before falling to Estrella Cabeza Candela. She then qualified for the Miami Open. In the first round, she crushed Alberta Brianti, but her run was cut short by 2011 French Open champion Li Na. She continued her U.S. season by qualifying for the Family Circle Cup in Charleston, South Carolina.

Czink's next tournament was the Morocco Open. She qualified without dropping a set, but was ousted by third seed Petra Cetkovská in the first round of the main draw.

Czink then headed to her home tournament at the Budapest Grand Prix. In the main draw, she defeated fellow qualifier Mervana Jugić-Salkić but fell in the second round to top seed Sara Errani, in three sets.

At the French Open, she crushed Anne Keothavong, 6–1, 6–2, in the first round, but was defeated by 22nd seed Anastasia Pavlyuchenkova in the following round.

== Performance timelines ==
Key
W	F	SF	QF	#R	RR	Q#	DNQ	A	NH

(W) winner; (F) finalist; (SF) semifinalist; (QF) quarterfinalist; (#R) rounds 4, 3, 2, 1; (RR) round-robin stage; (Q#) qualification round; (DNQ) did not qualify; (A) absent; (NH) not held; (SR) strike rate (events won / competed); (W–L) win–loss record.

=== Singles ===
Tournament	2002	2003	2004	2005	2006	2007	2008	2009	2010	2011	2012	2013	W–L
Australian Open	A	1R	2R	A	1R	1R	LQ	2R	1R	A	LQ	1R	2–7
French Open	A	LQ	1R	A	2R	1R	LQ	3R	1R	A	2R	1R	4–7
Wimbledon	A	A	1R	1R	2R	1R	LQ	1R	1R	3R	2R	A	4–8
US Open	LQ	3R	1R	LQ	1R	LQ	LQ	2R	A	LQ	1R	A	3–5
Win–loss	0–0	2–2	1–4	0–1	2–4	0–3	0–0	4–4	0–3	2–1	2–3	0–2	13–27

=== Doubles ===
Tournament	2004	2005	2006	2007	2008	2009	2010	2011	2012	2013	W–L
Australian Open	1R	A	A	A	A	A	2R	A	A	2R	2–3
French Open	A	A	1R	A	A	1R	1R	A	A	A	0–3
Wimbledon	A	A	1R	A	LQ	1R	1R	1R	A	A	0–4
US Open	A	A	1R	A	A	1R	A	A	1R	A	0–3
Win–loss	0–1	0–0	0–3	0–0	0–0	0–3	1–3	0–1	0–1	1–1	2–13

== WTA Tour finals ==
=== Singles: 2 (1 title, 1 runner-up) ===
Legend
Grand Slam
Premier M & Premier 5
WTA Premier
International (1–1)

Result	W–L	Date	Tournament	Tier	Surface	Opponent	Score
Loss	0–1	Jan 2005	Canberra International, Australia	Tier IV	Hard	(Serbia) Ana Ivanovic	5–7, 1–6
Win	1–1	Sep 2009	Tournoi de Québec, Canada	International	Carpet (i)	(Czech Republic) Lucie Šafářová	4–6, 6–3, 7–5

=== Doubles: 1 (runner-up) ===
Legend
Grand Slam
Premier M & Premier 5
Premier
International (0–1)

Result	Date	Tournament	Tier	Surface	Partner	Opponents	Score
Loss	Jan 2010	Brisbane International, Australia	International	Hard	(Spain) Arantxa Parra Santonja	(Czech Republic) Andrea Hlaváčková (Czech Republic) Lucie Hradecká	6–2, 6–7^{(3–7)}, [4–10]

== ITF Circuit finals ==
Legend
$100,000 tournaments
$75,000 tournaments
$50,000 tournaments
$40,000 tournaments
$25,000 tournaments
$10,000 tournaments

=== Singles: 28 (20–8) ===
Result	W–L	Date	Tournament	Tier	Surface	Opponent	Score
Loss	1.	Jun 2000	ITF Hoorn, Netherlands	10,000	Clay	(Netherlands) Anousjka van Exel	5–7, 6–7
Win	1.	Feb 2001	ITF Istanbul, Turkey	10,000	Hard	(Czech Republic) Magdalena Zděnovcová	5–7, 6–1, 6–2
Loss	2.	Apr 2001	ITF Belgrade, Serbia	10,000	Clay	(Serbia) Ana Timotić	3–6, 7–5, 5–7
Win	2.	Sep 2001	ITF Raleigh, United States	10,000	Clay	(United States) Allison Baker	6–3, 6–2
Win	3.	Oct 2001	ITF Aventura, United States	10,000	Clay	(Haiti) Neyssa Etienne	6–4, 6–3
Win	4.	Jan 2002	ITF Miami, United States	10,000	Hard	(United States) Lindsay Lee-Waters	7–5, 6–2
Win	5.	Feb 2002	ITF Saltillo, Mexico	40,000	Hard	(Austria) Petra Russegger	6–1, 3–6, 6–4
Win	6.	Feb 2002	ITF Monterrey, Mexico	40,000	Hard	(Ukraine) Yuliana Fedak	6–3, 3–6, 6–1
Win	7.	Feb 2002	ITF Matamoros, Mexico	40,000	Hard	(Argentina) Melisa Arévalo	6–2, 6–3
Loss	3.	Mar 2002	ITF San Luis Potosí, Mexico	25,000	Clay	(Spain) María Sánchez Lorenzo	5–7, 5–7
Win	8.	May 2002	ITF Sea Island, United States	25,000	Clay	(United States) Ashley Harkleroad	6–1, 5–7, 6–3
Loss	4.	Nov 2002	ITF Mount Gambier, Australia	25,000	Hard	(France) Stéphanie Cohen-Aloro	4–6, 2–6
Win	9.	May 2003	ITF Bromma, Sweden	25,000	Clay	(Croatia) Ivana Abramović	6–1, 6–2
Win	10.	Jun, 2003	ITF Lenzerheide, Switzerland	25,000	Clay	(Austria) Stefanie Haidner	6–3, 6–3
Win	11.	Jul 2003	ITF Modena, Italy	50,000	Clay	(China) Sun Tiantian	6–3, 6–3
Loss	5.	Jul 2003	ITF Innsbruck, Austria	50,000	Clay	(Russia) Vera Dushevina	6–7, 2–6
Loss	6.	Nov 2003	ITF Mexico City	10,000	Hard	(Hungary) Kira Nagy	2–6, 3–6
Win	12.	Nov 2003	ITF Puebla, Mexico	25,000	Hard	(Brazil) Carla Tiene	6–3, 6–2
Win	13.	Feb 2004	ITF Waikoloa, United States	50,000	Hard	(Argentina) María Emilia Salerni	7–6, 6–2
Win	14.	Nov 2004	ITF San Luis Potosí, Mexico	25,000	Hard	(Argentina) Mariana Díaz Oliva	6–0, 5–7, 6–3
Loss	7.	Jun 2005	ITF Fano, Italy	75,000	Clay	(Estonia) Kaia Kanepi	6–3, 1–6, 5–7
Loss	8.	Nov 2005	ITF Palm Beach Gardens, United States	50,000	Clay	(United States) Bethanie Mattek	6–4, 4–6, 4–6
Win	15.	Jan 2007	ITF Waikoloa, United States	50,000	Hard	(Romania) Edina Gallovits	6–2, 6–3
Win	16.	Aug 2007	ITF Washington, United States	75,000	Hard	(Ukraine) Olga Savchuk	7–5, 7–5
Win	17.	Sep 2007	ITF Ashland, United States	50,000	Hard	(United States) Varvara Lepchenko	6–1, 2–6, 6–4
Win	18.	Oct 2008	ITF Pittsburgh, United States	50,000	Hard	(United States) Varvara Lepchenko	6–2, 3–6, 6–1
Win	19.	Apr 2011	ITF Dothan, United States	50,000	Clay	(France) Stéphanie Foretz Gacon	6–2, 6–3
Win	20.	May 2011	ITF Indian Harbour Beach, United States	50,000	Clay	(United States) Alison Riske	4–6, 6–1, 6–4

=== Doubles: 16 (10–6) ===
Result	W–L	Date	Tournament	Tier	Surface	Partner	Opponents	Score
Win	1.	16 September 2001	ITF Greenville, US	10,000	Hard	(Georgia (country)) Salome Devidze	(France) Gaelle Adda (United States) Lindsay Lee-Waters	6–1, 6–4
Win	2.	30 September 2001	ITF Raleigh, US	10,000	Clay	(United States) Allison Baker	(New Zealand) Tracey O'Connor (New Zealand) Leanne Baker	6–4, 1–6, 6–4
Loss	1.	21 January 2002	ITF Miami, US	10,000	Clay	(Haiti) Neyssa Etienne	(United States) Stephanie Mabry (United States) Karin Miller	4–6, 7–6^{(5)}, 2–6
Loss	2.	12 May 2003	ITF Bromma, Sweden	25,000	Clay	(Hungary) Zsófia Gubacsi	(Argentina) Gisela Dulko (Argentina) María Emilia Salerni	4–6, 3–6
Loss	3.	21 July 2003	ITF Innsbruck, Austria	50,000	Clay	(Italy) Mara Santangelo	(Hungary) Kira Nagy (Sweden) Maria Wolfbrandt	4–6, 6–4, 4–6
Win	3.	1 December 2003	ITF Palm Beach Gardens, US	50,000	Clay	(Argentina) Erica Krauth	(Russia) Alina Jidkova (Russia) Tatiana Panova	6–1, 6–2
Loss	4.	15 November 2005	ITF Tucson, US	75,000	Hard	(Brazil) Maria Fernanda Alves	(Belarus) Victoria Azarenka (Belarus) Tatiana Poutchek	6–4, 6–7, 1–6
Win	4.	17 July 2007	ITF Boston, US	50,000	Hard	(South Africa) Natalie Grandin	(Latvia) Līga Dekmeijere (Turkey) İpek Şenoğlu	6–1, 6–3
Win	5.	20 July 2007	Lexington Challenger, US	50,000	Hard	(United States) Lindsay Lee-Waters	(Australia) Casey Dellacqua (South Africa) Natalie Grandin	6–2, 7–6^{(8)}
Win	6.	17 September 2007	ITF Albuquerque, US	75,000	Hard	(United States) Angela Haynes	(Latvia) Līga Dekmeijere (United States) Varvara Lepchenko	7–5, 6–4
Win	7.	3 March 2008	Las Vegas Open, US	50,000	Hard	(Czech Republic) Renata Voráčová	(Chinese Taipei) Chan Chin-wei (United States) Tetiana Luzhanska	6–3, 6–2
Win	8.	11 May 2008	Zagreb Ladies Open, Croatia	75,000	Clay	(United States) Sunitha Rao	(France) Stéphanie Foretz (Croatia) Jelena Kostanić Tošić	6–4, 6–2
Win	9.	6 October 2008	ITF Pittsburgh, US	50,000	Hard	(United States) Lindsay Lee-Waters	(United States) Raquel Kops-Jones (United States) Abigail Spears	6–2, 7–5
Loss	5.	9 February 2009	Midland Classic, US	75,000	Hard	(United States) Lindsay Lee-Waters	(Chinese Taipei) Chen Yi (Japan) Rika Fujiwara	5–7, 6–7^{(7)}
Loss	6.	21 September 2009	ITF Albuquerque, US	75,000	Hard	(United States) Lindsay Lee-Waters	(United States) Mashona Washington (United States) Riza Zalameda	3–6, 2–6
Win	10.	10 February 2013	Midland Classic, US	100,000	Hard (i)	(Croatia) Mirjana Lučić-Baroni	(Brazil) Maria Fernanda Alves (United Kingdom) Samantha Murray	5–7, 6–4, [10–7]
