= Bethanie Mattek-Sands =

American tennis player (born 1985)

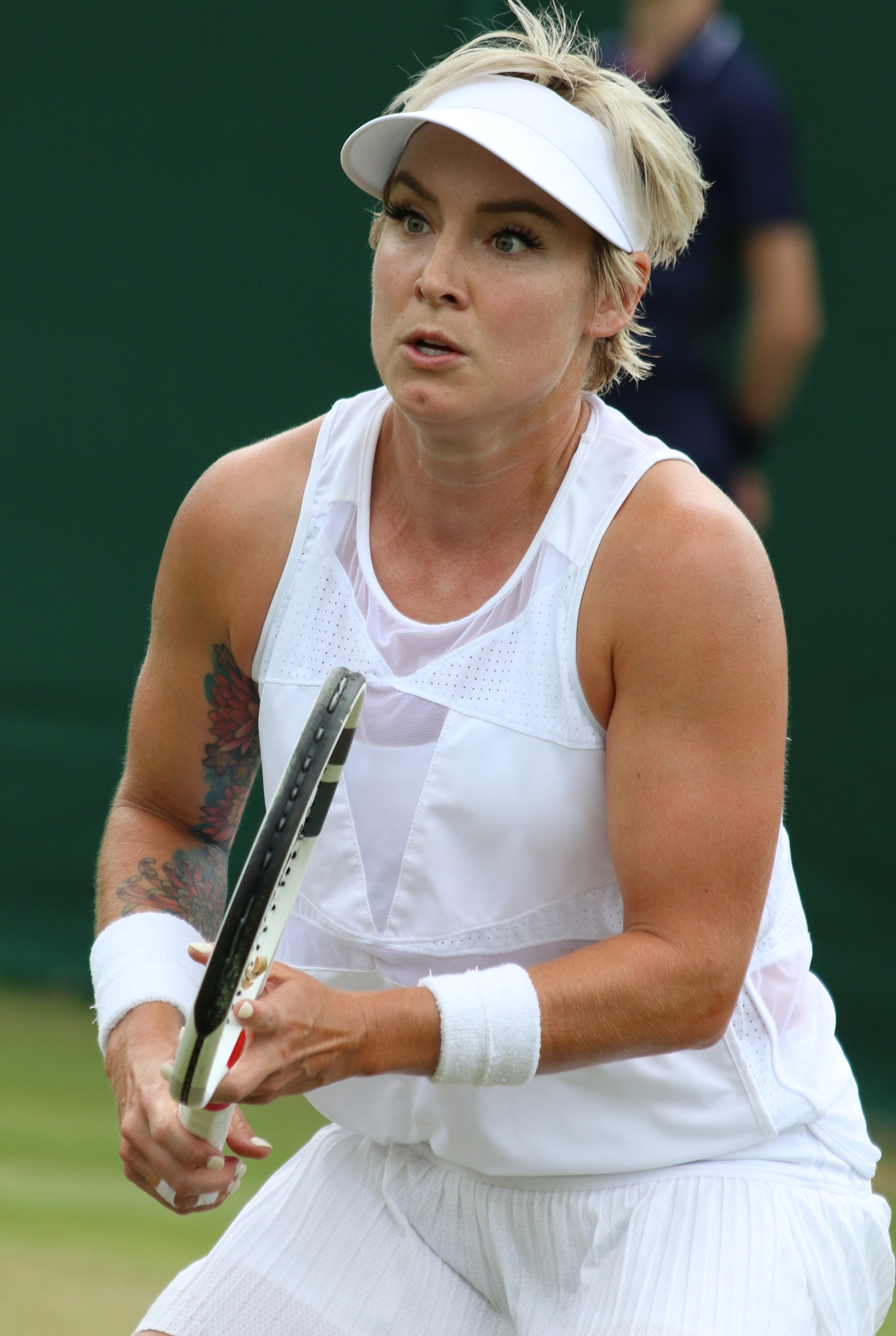
- Mattek-Sands at the 2019 Wimbledon Championships
- Country (sports): United States
- Residence: Phoenix, Arizona
- Born: March 23, 1985 (age 41) Rochester, Minnesota
- Height: 5 ft 6 in (168 cm)
- Turned pro: 1999
- Plays: Right (two-handed backhand)
- Coach: Jared Jacobs
- Prize money: US$ 8,913,872
- Official website: bmattek.com

Singles
- Career record: 377–323
- Career titles: 0
- Highest ranking: No. 30 (July 11, 2011)

Grand Slam singles results
- Australian Open: 3R (2015)
- French Open: 4R (2013)
- Wimbledon: 4R (2008)
- US Open: 3R (2015)

Doubles
- Career record: 473–273
- Career titles: 30
- Highest ranking: No. 1 (January 9, 2017)

Grand Slam doubles results
- Australian Open: W (2015, 2017)
- French Open: W (2015, 2017)
- Wimbledon: SF (2010)
- US Open: W (2016)

Other doubles tournaments
- Tour Finals: F (2016)
- Olympic Games: QF (2021)

Mixed doubles
- Career titles: 5

Grand Slam mixed doubles results
- Australian Open: W (2012)
- French Open: W (2015)
- Wimbledon: SF (2015)
- US Open: W (2018, 2019)

Other mixed doubles tournaments
- Olympic Games: W (2016)

Team competitions
- Fed Cup: W (2017) record 10–7
- Hopman Cup: W (2011)
Olympic Games
Women's tennis
Representing United States
Gold medal – first place	2016 Rio de Janeiro	Mixed doubles

Bethanie Mattek-Sands (née Bethanie Lynn Mattek; born March 23, 1985) is an American inactive tennis player. She won nine Grand Slam titles and an Olympic gold medal, and is a former world No. 1 in doubles. She held the top ranking for 32 consecutive weeks.

Mattek-Sands won 35 career doubles and mixed doubles titles, including five doubles majors at the 2015 Australian Open, 2015 French Open, 2016 US Open, 2017 Australian Open and 2017 French Open, all partnering Lucie Šafářová. The pair also were the runners-up of the 2016 WTA Finals. Mattek-Sands has also found great success in mixed doubles; she won the 2012 Australian Open with and the 2015 French Open and a gold medal at the 2016 Rio Olympics. Mattek-Sands then suffered a major knee injury in 2017 that required surgery and a year away from competition to heal, but eventually came back to win the 2018 and 2019 US Open mixed doubles titles, both partnering Jamie Murray. Mattek also played World TeamTennis for the Hartford FoxForce in 2000, the Sacramento Capitals in 2006, and the New York Sportimes in 2008.

Mattek-Sands also won five singles and three doubles titles on the ITF Women's Circuit. Her best results in singles on the WTA Tour are reaching the fourth round of two major events (Wimbledon in 2008 and the French Open in 2013), the semifinals of the tournaments in Cincinnati in 2005 and Birmingham in 2008, and the final of the Bell Challenge in 2008 and 2010. She reached a career-high singles ranking of No. 30 in the world, in July 2011.

== Career ==
In 1999, Mattek played her first WTA Tour event in Philadelphia where she received a wildcard into the qualifying where she lost in the first round to Nana Miyagi -her only tour match of the year. Then in 2000, she received a wildcard into qualifying at the International Players Championships in Key Biscayne but lost in the first round to Anca Barna. Later in the year, she was handed a wildcard into her first major event at the US Open. She lost in the first round of qualifying to Gisela Rivera.

In 2001, Mattek again received a wildcard into the qualifying at the Miami Open in Key Biscayne, Florida, but lost in the second round of qualifying to Sandra Cacic. With direct entry into the ITF event in Boynton Beach due to a wildcard, she defeated top-seeded Elena Likhovtseva in the first round and Jennifer Hopkins in the second but lost against Åsa Carlsson. As a result, her ranking rose up to world No. 343. Mattek received direct entry into the Bausch & Lomb Championships at Amelia Island thanks to a wildcard. However, she lost to fellow American Jill Craybas in the first round. Mattek played another ITF event, the Bronx Open, as a wildcard entrant but lost in the first round to Sylvia Plischke. Due to a wildcard, she played her first main draw in a Grand Slam tournament at the US Open but lost to Australia's Alicia Molik in the first round. Mattek ended the year ranked world No. 338.

=== 2008: Wimbledon fourth round, first WTA Tour final and top 40 in singles, top 25 in doubles ===
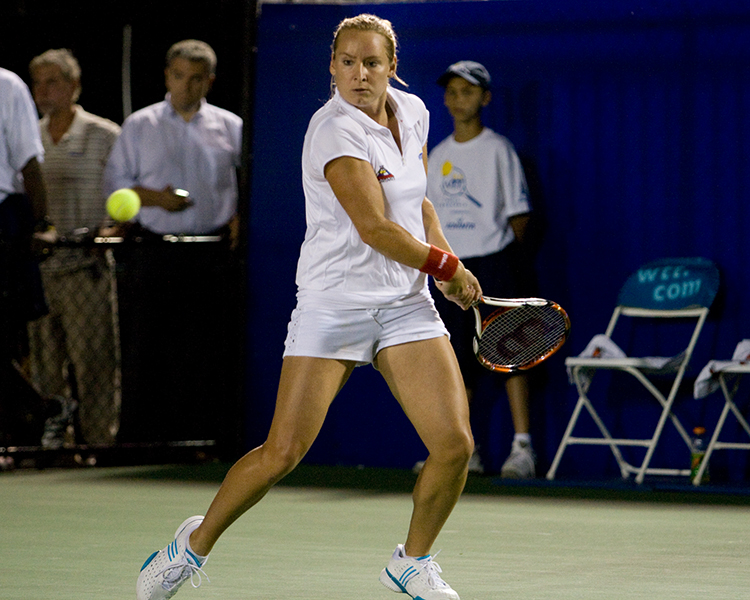
Mattek playing for the New York Sportimes during a World Team Tennis match in Mamaroneck on July 10, 2008

In 2008, Mattek reached a then career-high singles ranking of No. 38 on November 3, 2008, and a then career-high ranking of No. 24 in doubles. At the major tournaments, she did not qualify for the Australian Open, but reached second rounds of the French Open and US Open. Her best performance was at Wimbledon where she reached the fourth round, claiming her first top-10 win over 2007 Wimbledon runner-up, Marion Bartoli. She then lost in the round of 16 to fellow American Serena Williams.

At the LA Championships, Mattek made it to the semifinals before losing to tenth-seeded Flavia Pennetta. In November, she reached her first ever WTA Tour final at the Bell Challenge in Canada, before losing to the top-seeded Nadia Petrova.

=== 2009: Injury and comeback ===
In 2009, she had to pull out of the Australian Open with a hip injury. She later made her season debut at the Indian Wells Open and reached the second round, before losing to Gisela Dulko. She also entered the doubles event with Mashona Washington, where she reached the third round. At Wimbledon, she lost in the first round to the 18th seed Samantha Stosur.

=== 2011: Career-high singles ranking of 30, first Masters doubles final ===
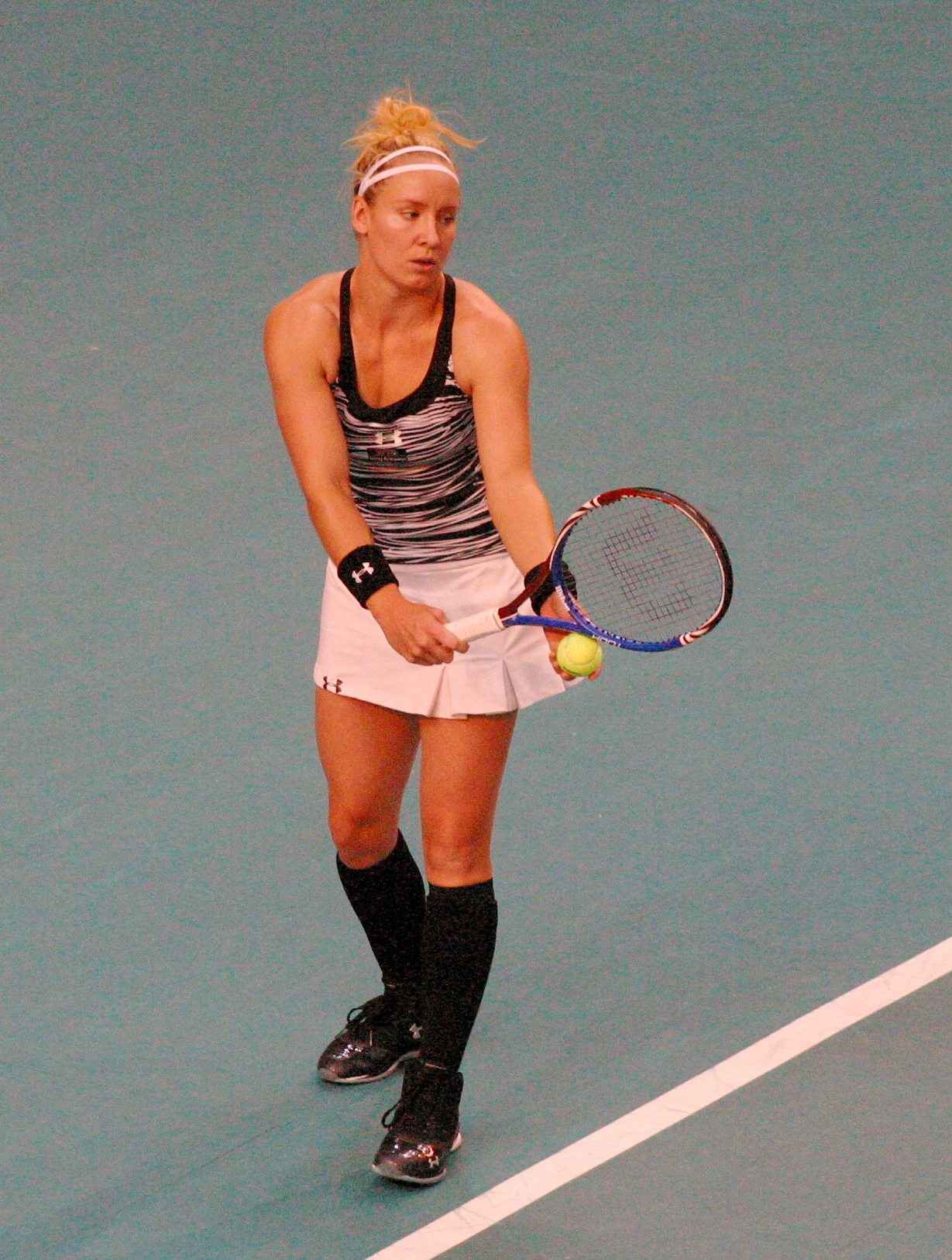
Mattek-Sands in 2011

In January 2011, Mattek-Sands got the biggest win of her career by defeating world No. 7, Francesca Schiavone. Mattek-Sands later teamed with John Isner for the U.S. and reached the Hopman Cup final, defeating the Belgian team of Justine Henin and Ruben Bemelmans.

Her good form continued into the Hobart International, where she reached her third career singles final, before losing to Jarmila Groth.

At the Australian Open, Mattek-Sands lost to qualifier Arantxa Rus in the first round. She reached the quarterfinals of the women's doubles with partner Meghann Shaughnessy, and made the semifinals of mixed doubles. Her next event was a Fed Cup tie against Belgium in Antwerp, where she lost to Yanina Wickmayer in the opening rubber, and later to Kim Clijsters.

At the indoor tournament in Paris, she advanced to her second semifinal in her third tour event of the season. She lost to eventual champion, Petra Kvitová. Mattek-Sands and Shaughnessy then made it to the final of the doubles event without dropping a set and defeated the team of Dushevina/Makarova to win their first doubles title as a team. It was her ninth career WTA doubles title. After her success in Paris, Mattek-Sands rushed off to Dubai, where she suffered an opening round loss to Peng Shuai.

At Indian Wells, she made it to the second round, before losing to tenth seeded Shahar Pe'er. Pairing with Shaughnessy, the American duo made it to the doubles finals losing to Sania Mirza and Elena Vesnina. In her next tournament in Miami, Mattek-Sands lost in the second round to world No. 1, Caroline Wozniacki.

After Miami, Mattek-Sands was off to Charleston for the start of the clay-court season, where she was beaten in the second round by Elena Vesnina. In doubles, Mattek-Sands/Shaughnessy made the finals of Charleston, but were once again defeated by the team of Vesnina/Mirza. Mattek-Sands next entered a small clay event in Estoril where she was the fifth-seeded player in singles, but was then upset in the first round by Monica Niculescu.

At the Madrid Open, she caused an upset in the first round when she defeated former French Open champion Ana Ivanovic, after coming back from a first-set loss at love. She eventually made it to the quarterfinals, before losing to Li Na in three sets. Mattek-Sands faced Flavia Pennetta in her opening-round match in Rome. She defeated Pennetta in three sets, but lost to Jarmila Gajdošová in the second round.

She played in the French Open and made it to the third round, which was her best result at this major in her career thus far, before losing to the higher-seeded as well as her good friend, Jelena Janković.

At Wimbledon, Mattek-Sands (then ranked 30th) was upset in the first round against then ranked 133rd Misaki Doi from Japan. Despite the loss, Mattek-Sands reached a career-high ranking of world No. 30 for the first time, on 11 July 2011.

She then had to withdraw from her heavily scheduled U.S. hardcourt series events due to a shoulder injury. She did try to play at the US Open, but lost to Polona Hercog in the first round. In the women's doubles competition, she acquired a new partner due to the retirement of Meghann Shaughnessy. She teamed up with Jarmila Gajdošová, and they reached the third round where they lost to the team of Huber/Raymond.

=== 2012: First major mixed-doubles title ===
Mattek-Sands started her year representing the U.S. in the 2012 Hopman Cup with Mardy Fish. She came up short in her singles matches against Wimbledon champion, Petra Kvitová of the Czech Republic and Denmark's world No. 1, Caroline Wozniacki, but beat Bulgaria's Tsvetana Pironkova in the third tie. After an early exit from the Hopman Cup, she played singles at the Hobart International, where she was a finalist, and doubles with partner Gajdošová. In singles, she lost in the second round to Sorana Cîrstea, and in doubles, she reached the semifinals, before having to retire due to a neck injury.

At the Australian Open, Mattek-Sands lost to Agnieszka Radwańska in the first round. In the doubles competition, she reached the third round with Jarmila Gajdošová, before losing to the Indian/Russian pairing of Sania Mirza and Elena Vesnina. In the mixed doubles competition, she and Romanian partner, Horia Tecău finally had their breakthrough moment, defeating title favorites, Bhuphati/Mirza in the semifinals. They then went on to win the title by defeating the team of Elena Vesnina and Leander Paes in the final.

Mattek-Sands made it through the qualifying draw at the Paris Indoors. In the main draw, she made it to the second round, before losing to Roberta Vinci in three sets.

Mattek-Sands started to play on the doubles circuit with Sania Mirza, with whom she had had success in the past. In only their second tournament as a team in 2012, the Indian-American duo won the Premier-level event in Brussels, Belgium. However, they could not hold on to the good form as they were upset in the first round at Roland Garros. They made it to the third round of Wimbledon, but were eliminated by the Williams sisters.

Mattek-Sands and Mirza were beaten in the first round of the WTA Tour event in Carlsbad, California by Chan Hao-ching and Chan Yung-jan.

After reaching the quarterfinal of the Lexington Challenger, Mattek-Sands failed to win another main-draw match in singles. However, with Mirza in doubles, she reached the quarterfinals of Montreal and the third round of the US Open, playing eventual champions Sara Errani and Roberta Vinci to three sets.

=== 2013: French Open fourth round in singles ===
Mattek-Sands received a wild card to play in Kuala Lumpur, and justified it, as she reached the final ranked at No. 197. She lost to Karolína Plíšková, despite winning first set. At home event in Charleston, she brushed aside fellow American and that year's Australian Open semifinalist Sloane Stephens, before losing to Madison Keys in third round. At Premier event in Stuttgart, Bethanie reached the semifinals as qualifier, stunning No. 7 Sara Errani and Sabine Lisicki in the second round and quarterfinals, respectively. There she lost to Li Na.

At the French Open, Mattek-Sands won against the sixth seeded Li Na in the second round, beating her in three sets. Mattek-Sands was placed 61 places lower than Li, the 2011 champion, in the WTA rankings. She subsequently reached the fourth round, where she lost to Maria Kirilenko. This was her best showing at this major in singles in her career.

After a successful clay-court season, she didn't continue in that style, losing in the first or second rounds at all tournaments. At Wimbledon, she lost in round one to Angelique Kerber and to Ekaterina Makarova in the second round of US Open.

=== 2014: Multiple injuries and loss of form ===
At Sydney International, she qualified for tournament and then beat Eugenie Bouchard and No. 5, Agnieszka Radwańska. Both defeated players would go on to reach semifinals of the first Grand Slam event of the season, which made Mattek-Sands' wins bigger. But during her quarterfinal match against Madison Keys, she retired in the first set due to lumbar spine injury.

At Australian Open, she wasn't happy with draw, as she was the first opponent of third seed Maria Sharapova, losing in two sets. At the Pattaya Open, Mattek-Sands lost in the first round to Karolína Plíšková. In Doha, she beat again Bouchard, before losing to Monica Niculescu.

After losing in first round of Miami, Bethanie underwent hip surgery. She came back on court in September, when she played in Wuhan and lost in qualifying. She qualified for the China Open, but lost in the first round to another qualifier, Mona Barthel, in three sets. Her season was finished, after playing two more events without success.

=== 2015: Australian & French Open doubles and mixed doubles champion ===
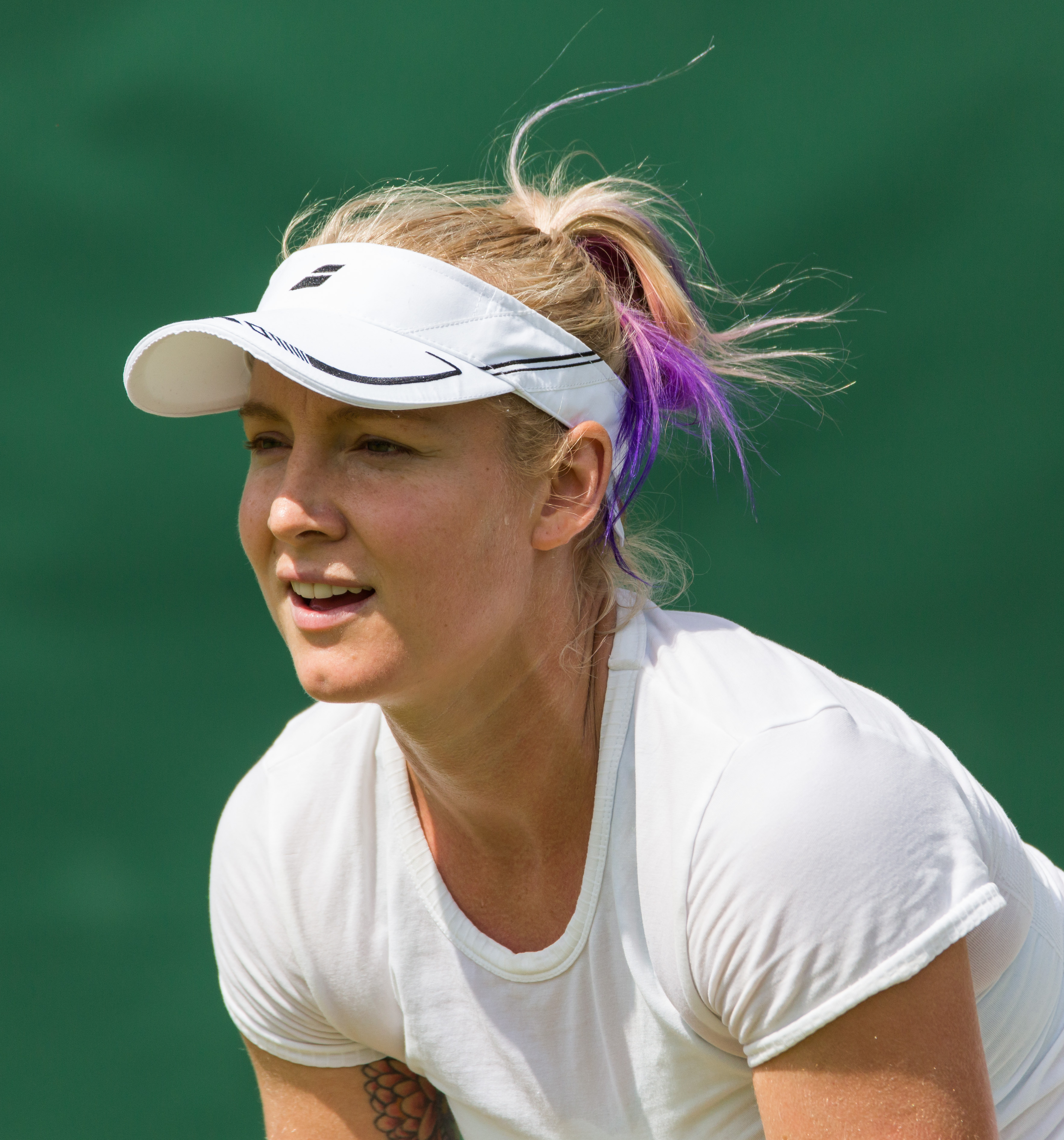
Mattek-Sands at the 2015 Wimbledon qualifying

In 2015, Mattek-Sands won the 2015 Australian Open and 2015 French Open women's doubles alongside Lucie Šafářová.

She also won the French Open mixed doubles title with partner Mike Bryan.

=== 2016: Olympic gold medal and US Open champion ===
In 2016, Mattek-Sands had success in both doubles and mixed doubles.

At the Australian Open, she was unable to defend her title with Lucie Šafářová because of a bacterial infection. Mattek-Sands competed with Sabine Lisicki instead, and lost in the second round.

In March, she competed in the Indian Wells Open women's doubles event. She competed with fellow American CoCo Vandeweghe. Mattek-Sands and Vandeweghe claimed the title, defeating Julia Görges and Karolína Plíšková. Next, in Miami, Mattek-Sands (partnering with Šafářová, her regular partner again) reached the final, in which she and Šafářová won against Tímea Babos and Yaroslava Shvedova. These were Mattek-Sands' second and third Premier-Mandatory/Premier-5 titles, respectively.

At the French Open, Mattek-Sands and Šafářová (the defending champions) lost in the first round to Kiki Bertens and Johanna Larsson. In June, at Wimbledon, they had another first-round exit, losing to Daria Gavrilova and Daria Kasatkina.

At the 2016 Summer Olympics in Rio de Janeiro, Mattek-Sands became an Olympic gold medalist when she won the mixed-doubles title with Jack Sock against Venus Williams and Rajeev Ram in an all-American match-up.

Her success with Šafářová was reignited at the US Open, when the pair won the title against Caroline Garcia and Kristina Mladenovic, the No. 1 seeds. This was Mattek-Sands' third major title with Šafářová, and third overall (in women's doubles).

In September 2016, hacked documents from the World Anti-Doping Agency (WADA) revealed that Mattek-Sands had twice applied for a therapeutic-use exemption for hydrocortisone and DHEA. Both times the request was granted by the International Tennis Federation before being revoked by WADA, but an application for exemption for hydrocortisone alone was eventually approved. Mattek-Sands has refused to comment on the exemption.

Mattek-Sands and Šafářová had an excellent finish during the Asian leg, the final leg of the WTA Tour. The pair competed at the Wuhan Open, their first Premier-Mandatory/ Premier-5 tournament since May. They ended up winning the title, defeating the doubles world No. 1 and defending champion, Sania Mirza, and Barbora Strýcová. Their winning streak continued over in Beijing, where Mattek-Sands and Šafářová claimed the title again Caroline Garcia and Kristina Mladenovic. These were their fourth and fifth Premier-Mandatory/Premier-5 titles together, respectively, and their fourth and fifth titles of 2016. These victories also allowed Mattek-Sands and Šafářová to qualify for the 2016 WTA Finals. They were the fourth team to do so.

At the WTA Finals, Mattek-Sands and Šafářová defeated Tímea Babos and Yaroslava Shvedova in the quarterfinals, and their rivals Caroline Garcia and Kristina Mladenovic in the semifinals. Had the pair won in the final, Mattek-Sands would have become the WTA doubles year-end No. 1. However, the American-Czech team was defeated by Makarova and Vesnina.

=== 2017: World No. 1 doubles ranking, and second Australian and French Open title ===
Mattek-Sands played at the Brisbane International with Sania Mirza, the defending champion, in doubles. The duo defeated Makarova and Vesnina in the final, with Mattek-Sands succeeding Mirza as the new world No. 1 in doubles.

At the Australian Open, Mattek-Sands competed with Šafářová. The pair won their second Australian Open doubles title in three years, and their second straight Grand Slam tournament, defeating Andrea Hlaváčková and Peng Shuai in the final, in three sets.

Mattek-Sands won the French Open women's doubles title, again with Šafářová, by beating Ashleigh Barty and Casey Dellacqua, in straight sets.

Playing Sorana Cîrstea in the second round of Wimbledon, Mattek-Sands was running to the net at the beginning of the third set when she collapsed in agony, clutching at her right knee. She shouted out a large number of expletives for which she later apologized. She was treated on the court before being rushed to a local hospital with an "acute knee injury" which was later revealed to be a dislocated kneecap and ruptured patellar ligament, for which surgery was required. Mattek-Sands had suffered a torn medial collateral ligament on the same knee in September 2013.

=== 2018–19: Comeback and two US Open mixed-doubles titles ===
In March 2018, Mattek-Sands returned to compete at the 2018 Miami Open in singles as a wildcard and in doubles. At the French Open, she reached the second round with Latisha Chan, and at Wimbledon, she reached quarterfinals with Lucie Šafářová. She also reached quarterfinals in the US Open mixed doubles and won the title, partnering Scotsman Jamie Murray in their first entry as a pair; it was her eighth Grand Slam doubles title overall and Murray's sixth (including the same tournament the previous year). The pair defended their title at the 2019 US Open.

=== 2020–21: Third French Open final ===
Mattek-Sands and Jamie Murray were the runners-up at the 2020 Australian Open.

Seeded 14th at the 2021 French Open, Mattek-Sands partnered with previous year's singles champion, Iga Świątek. The pair, who were playing just their third event together, reached the final in which they were defeated by Czech duo Barbora Krejčíková and Kateřina Siniaková in straight sets.

=== 2022–25: Comeback, Miami champion & 30th doubles title, hiatus ===
After a whole year off since October 2021, she came back for the last WTA 1000 in 2022 as a wildcard pair with Viktoria Azarenka at the inaugural Guadalajara Open.

At the 2023 Italian Open, she reached the semifinals with Marie Bouzková using protected ranking; they lost to fourth seeds and eventual champions, Elise Mertens and Storm Hunter.

In March 2024, partnering Sofia Kenin, she won her second Miami title and seventh overall at the WTA 1000 level, having entered the tournament as alternates. It was her second doubles title at this level with Kenin, third overall as a team and 30th in her career.

At the 2024 Prague Open in July, she advanced to the final with Lucie Šafářová where they lost to top seeds Krejčíková and Siniaková.

== Fashion ==
Mattek has achieved extensive publicity as a result of her eccentric fashion sense on the court. Notable outfits include leopard print outfits at the 2004 US Open and 2007 US Open, a striped cowboy hat that garnered her a fine at the 2005 US Open, a "soccer theme" at the 2006 Wimbledon Championships that included £10 football socks, chandelier earrings, a tube top worn over a strappy vest top, tiny running shorts and a headband, pink knee-high socks at the 2006 JPMorgan Chase Open, and a loosely draped beige top, with a crocheted waist and split sleeves that resembled a toga and beige knee-high socks at the 2006 US Open. During the 2011 pre-Wimbledon party in London, Mattek-Sands wore a fluorescent green dress, by designer Alex Noble, that featured tennis balls as components and a Mohican-style hat.

== Personal life ==
Mattek grew up in Minnesota and Wisconsin. On November 29, 2008, she married insurance executive Justin Sands in Naples, Florida. Since then she has used the name Mattek-Sands professionally. She lives in Phoenix, Arizona.

== Performance timelines ==
Key
W	F	SF	QF	#R	RR	Q#	P#	DNQ	A	Z#	PO	G	S	B	NMS	NTI	P	NH

(W) winner; (F) finalist; (SF) semifinalist; (QF) quarterfinalist; (#R) rounds 4, 3, 2, 1; (RR) round-robin stage; (Q#) qualification round; (P#) preliminary round; (DNQ) did not qualify; (A) absent; (Z#) Davis/Fed Cup Zonal Group (with number indication) or (PO) play-off; (G) gold, (S) silver or (B) bronze Olympic/Paralympic medal; (NMS) not a Masters tournament; (NTI) not a Tier I tournament; (P) postponed; (NH) not held; (SR) strike rate (events won / competed); (W–L) win–loss record.
To avoid confusion and double counting, these charts are updated at the conclusion of a tournament or when the player's participation has ended.

Only main-draw results on WTA Tour, Grand Slam tournaments, Fed Cup/Billie Jean King Cup and Olympic Games are included in win–loss records.

=== Singles ===
Current through the 2022 US Open.

Tournament	2001	2002	2003	2004	2005	2006	2007	2008	2009	2010	2011	2012	2013	2014	2015	2016	2017	2018	2019	2020	2021	2022	2023	SR	W–L	Win %
Grand Slam tournaments
Australian Open	A	A	A	Q2	A	Q3	Q3	Q1	A	Q3	1R	1R	Q1	1R	3R	1R	Q3	A	1R	A	A	A		0 / 6	2–6	25%
French Open	A	A	A	Q2	Q2	1R	Q1	2R	1R	2R	3R	2R	4R	A	1R	1R	3R	2R	A	A	A	A		0 / 11	11–11	50%
Wimbledon	A	A	Q3	Q2	A	1R	2R	4R	1R	1R	1R	A	1R	A	3R	1R	2R	A	A	NH	A	A		0 / 10	7–10	41%
US Open	1R	1R	1R	1R	1R	1R	2R	2R	2R	2R	1R	1R	2R	A	3R	1R	A	Q1	Q1	A	A	A		0 / 15	7–15	32%
Win–Loss	0–1	0–1	0–1	0–1	0–1	0–3	2–2	5–3	1–3	2–3	2–4	1–3	4–3	0–1	6–4	0–4	3–2	1–1	0–1	0–0	0–0	0–0		0 / 42	27–42	39%
National representation
Billie Jean King Cup	Absent								SF	F	PO	Absent				PO	F	F	A	SF		A		0 / 5	2–6	25%
WTA 1000
Qatar Open	not Tier I							A	not held		NTI	A	1R	2R	NMS	1R	NMS	A	NMS	A	NMS	A	NMS	0 / 3	1–3	25%
Dubai	not Tier I								A	A	1R	Not Premier 5			A	NMS	A	NMS	A	NMS	Q1	NMS		0 / 1	0–1	0%
Indian Wells Open	A	A	1R	Q1	Q1	2R	2R	1R	2R	2R	2R	1R	1R	1R	1R	1R	1R	A	A	NH	A	A		0 / 13	5–13	28%
Miami Open	Q2	A	1R	A	A	Q1	Q2	Q1	1R	1R	2R	A	2R	1R	A	1R	4R	1R	A	NH	Q2	A		0 / 9	5–9	36%
Madrid Open	not held								1R	A	QF	Q1	1R	A	1R	Q2	Q1	Q2	A	NH	A	A		0 / 4	3–4	43%
Italian Open	A	A	A	A	A	A	A	A	2R	2R	2R	Q1	A	A	A	Q2	Q2	Q1	A	A	A	A		0 / 3	3–3	50%
Canadian Open	A	A	A	2R	A	A	A	1R	Q1	2R	A	Q1	1R	A	Q1	Q2	A	Q1	A	NH	A	A		0 / 4	2–4	33%
Cincinnati Open	not held			not Tier I					Q1	A	A	1R	1R	A	A	A	A	1R	Q2	A	A	A		0 / 3	0–3	0%
Pan Pacific Open	A	A	A	Q3	A	Q2	1R	A	A	A	A	A	A	Not Premier 5										0 / 1	0–1	0%
Guadalajara Open	not held																					Q1		0 / 0	0–0	–
Wuhan Open	not held													Q2	A	1R	A	A	Q2	NH				0 / 1	0–1	0%
China Open	not held			not Tier I					A	A	A	A	A	1R	QF	A	A	A	A	NH				0 / 2	3–2	60%
Career statistics
	2001	2002	2003	2004	2005	2006	2007	2008	2009	2010	2011	2012	2013	2014	2015	2016	2017	2018	2019	2020	2021	2022	2023	SR	W–L	Win %
Tournaments	2	1	5	3	3	12	8	14	14	13	14	9	15	9	14	15	7	7	3	1	2	1	1	172		
Titles	0	0	0	0	0	0	0	0	0	0	0	0	0	0	0	0	0	0	0	0	0	0		0		
Finals	0	0	0	0	0	0	0	1	0	1	1	0	1	0	0	0	0	0	0	0	0	0		4		
Hard win–loss	0–1	0–1	0–4	2–3	3–3	5–4	5–5	6–6	2–7	5–7	11–10	4–8	7–9	3–9	8–7	3–10	3–4	0–5	1–3	0–1	2–2	0–1	0–1	0 / 105	70–110	38.89%
Clay win–loss	0–1	0–0	0–1	0–0	0–0	3–6	0–0	2–5	3–6	6–5	7–5	1–1	8–4	0–0	4–6	2–4	3–2	1–2	0–0	0–0	0–0	0–0		0 / 47	40–48	45.45%
Grass win–loss	0–0	0–0	0–0	0–0	0–0	1–2	1–2	7–2	0–2	1–2	0–1	0–0	0–1	0–0	2–1	0–1	1–1	0–0	0–0	0–0	0–0	0–0		0 / 15	13–15	46.43%
Carpet win–loss	0–0	0–0	0–0	0–0	0–0	0–0	0–1	4–1	2–1	4–1	0–0	0–0	1–1	0–0	0–0	0–0	0–0	0–0	0–0	0–0	0–0	0–0		0 / 5	11–5	68.75%
Overall win–loss	0–2	0–1	0–5	2–3	3–3	9–12	6–8	19–14	7–16	16–15	18–16	5–9	16–15	3–9	14–14	5–15	7–7	1–7	1–3	0–1	2–2	0–1	0–1	0 / 172	134–178	42.95%
Win %	0%	0%	0%	40%	50%	43%	43%	58%	30%	52%	53%	36%	52%	25%	50%	25%	50%	13%	25%	0%	50%	0%	0%	42.95%		
Year-end ranking	338	270	135	166	171	104	112	39	152	59	55	173	47	175	61	175	121	370	398	338	367	—		$8,335,875		

=== Doubles ===
Tournament	2001	2002	2003	2004	2005	2006	2007	2008	2009	2010	2011	2012	2013	2014	2015	2016	2017	2018	2019	2020	2021	2022	2023	2024	SR	W–L	Win %
Grand Slam tournaments
Australian Open	A	A	A	2R	A	A	2R	3R	A	QF	QF	3R	1R	A	W	2R	W	A	1R	3R	2R	A	1R	1R	2 / 15	27–13	68%
French Open	A	A	A	3R	A	1R	1R	2R	QF	3R	2R	1R	3R	A	W	1R	W	2R	A	QF	F	A	1R	2R	2 / 17	33–15	69%
Wimbledon	A	A	A	2R	A	2R	2R	QF	3R	SF	2R	3R	A	A	QF	1R	2R	QF	QF	NH	2R	A	A	3R	0 / 15	29–15	66%
US Open	1R	1R	2R	1R	1R	3R	QF	A	QF	QF	3R	3R	A	A	A	W	A	2R	1R	1R	3R	A	2R	3R	1 / 18	28–17	62%
Win–loss	0–1	0–1	1–1	4–4	0–1	3–3	5–4	6–3	8–3	12–4	7–4	6–4	2–2	0–0	15–1	7–3	12–0	5–3	3–3	6–3	9–4	0–0	1–3	6–4	5 / 65	113–60	65%
National representation
Billie Jean King Cup	Absent								SF	F	PO	Absent				PO	F	F	A	SF		A			0 / 5	8–1	89%
Year-end championships
WTA Finals	Did not qualify														RR	F	A	A	A	NH	A	A			0 / 2	3–3	50%
WTA 1000
Qatar Open	not Tier I							A	not held		NTI	A	1R	A	NMS	QF	NMS	A	NMS	2R	NMS	A	NMS	1R	0 / 4	2–4	33%
Dubai	not Tier I								A	A	QF	not Premier 5			A	NMS	A	NMS	A	NMS	SF	NMS	QF	1R	0 / 4	6–4	60%
Indian Wells Open	A	A	A	1R	A	1R	1R	SF	QF	SF	F	QF	1R	A	1R	W	SF	A	A	NH	2R	A	1R	1R	1 / 15	22–14	61%
Miami Open	A	A	A	A	A	A	1R	2R	2R	1R	2R	A	QF	A	A	W	2R	1R	A	NH	SF	A	1R	W	2 / 12	19–10	66%
Madrid Open	not held								2R	2R	QF	A	2R	A	SF	A	2R	QF	A	NH	2R	A	QF	2R	0 / 10	14–10	58%
Italian Open	A	A	A	A	A	A	A	A	A	QF	QF	2R	QF	A	QF	2R	1R	1R	A	1R	1R	A	SF	2R	0 / 12	13–11	54%
Canadian Open	A	A	A	1R	A	A	A	A	1R	1R	A	QF	A	A	W	QF	A	1R	A	NH	A	A	1R	SF	1 / 9	11–8	58%
Cincinnati Open	not held			not Tier I					QF	A	A	1R	A	A	A	A	A	1R	1R	1R	QF	A	A	1R	0 / 7	4–7	36%
Pan Pacific Open	A	A	A	A	A	QF	QF	A	A	A	A	A	A	not Premier 5											0 / 2	2–2	50%
Guadalajara Open	not held																					1R	2R	NMS	0 / 2	1–2	33%
Wuhan Open	not held													QF	A	W	A	2R	QF	NH				1R	1 / 5	10–4	71%
China Open	not held			not Tier I					A	A	A	A	A	1R	QF	W	A	1R	W	NH			1R	SF	2 / 7	14–5	74%
Career statistics
	2001	2002	2003	2004	2005	2006	2007	2008	2009	2010	2011	2012	2013	2014	2015	2016	2017	2018	2019	2020	2021	2022	2023	2024	SR	W–L	Win %
Tournaments	1	1	4	8	4	16	15	15	16	18	14	13	11	3	13	16	9	12	10	10	19	1			228		
Titles	0	0	0	1	0	0	1	2	3	1	1	1	2	0	5	5	4	0	1	0	0	0	1	2	28		
Finals	0	0	0	1	1	2	1	2	3	5	3	1	3	0	5	7	4	0	1	0	2	0	2	4	42		
Hard win–loss	0–1	0–1	1–3	5–5	5–4	7–5	14–8	9–6	11–6	17–9	16–6	12–9	12–5	2–3	16–5	34–6	14–2	2–6	14–7	10–8	19–11	0–1			16 / 133	220–116	65.48%
Clay win–loss	0–0	0–0	0–1	2–1	0–0	7–6	1–2	11–3	17–3	13–5	8–4	5–2	8–4	0–0	16–2	4–4	10–2	5–6	0–0	3–2	10–5	0–0			11 / 64	120–52	69.77%
Grass win–loss	0–0	0–0	0–0	1–1	0–0	4–3	1–3	3–3	3–2	7–2	3–2	2–1	0–0	0–0	3–1	0–1	1–0	3–1	5–2	0–0	1–2	0–0			0 / 26	37–24	60.66%
Carpet win–loss	0–0	0–0	0–0	0–0	0–0	1–1	1–1	0–1	2–1	3–1	0–0	0–0	0–0	0–0	0–0	0–0	0–0	0–0	0–0	0–0	0–0	0–0			0 / 5	7–5	58.33%
Overall win–loss	0–1	0–1	1–4	8–7	5–4	19–15	17–14	23–13	33–12	40–17	27–12	19–12	20–9	2–3	35–8	38–11	25–4	10–13	19–9	13–10	30–18	0–1			27 / 228	384–197	66.09%
Win %	0%	0%	20%	53%	56%	56%	55%	64%	73%	70%	69%	61%	69%	40%	81%	78%	86%	43%	68%	57%	63%	0%			66.09%		
Year-end ranking	524	533	106	106	120	47	36	26	17	17	17	35	36	268	3	5	8	65	24	20	15	—	51				

=== Mixed doubles ===
Tournament	2006	2007	2008	2009	2010	2011	2012	2013	2014	2015	2016	2017	2018	2019	2020	2021	2022	2023	SR	W–L	Win %
Grand Slam tournaments
Australian Open	A	A	1R	A	2R	SF	W	1R	A	A	QF	QF	A	QF	F	2R	A	2R	1 / 11	21–9	70%
French Open	A	A	2R	1R	1R	A	2R	A	A	W	A	1R	A	A	NH	1R	A	2R	1 / 8	8–6	57%
Wimbledon	2R	A	1R	3R	3R	A	A	A	A	SF	A	A	2R	2R	NH	3R	A	A	0 / 8	9–6	60%
US Open	A	A	A	QF	SF	A	1R	A	A	F	A	A	W	W	NH	1R	A	2R	2 / 8	20–6	77%
Win–Loss	1–1	0–0	1–3	3–3	5–4	3–1	6–1	0–1	0–0	12–2	2–1	2–1	6–0	8–2	4–1	2–3	0–0	3–3	4 / 35	58–27	68%
National representation
Summer Olympics	NH						A	NH			G	NH				1R	NH		1 / 2	4–1	80%

== Grand Slam tournament finals ==
=== Doubles: 6 (5 titles, 1 runner-up) ===
Result	Year	Championship	Surface	Partner	Opponents	Score
Win	2015	Australian Open	Hard	(Czech Republic) Lucie Šafářová	(Chinese Taipei) Chan Yung-jan (China) Zheng Jie	6–4, 7–6^{(7–5)}
Win	2015	French Open	Clay	(Czech Republic) Lucie Šafářová	(Australia) Casey Dellacqua (Kazakhstan) Yaroslava Shvedova	3–6, 6–4, 6–2
Win	2016	US Open	Hard	(Czech Republic) Lucie Šafářová	(France) Caroline Garcia (France) Kristina Mladenovic	2–6, 7–6^{(7–5)}, 6–4
Win	2017	Australian Open (2)	Hard	(Czech Republic) Lucie Šafářová	(Czech Republic) Andrea Hlaváčková (China) Peng Shuai	6–7^{(4–7)}, 6–3, 6–3
Win	2017	French Open (2)	Clay	(Czech Republic) Lucie Šafářová	(Australia) Ashleigh Barty (Australia) Casey Dellacqua	6–2, 6–1
Loss	2021	French Open	Clay	(Poland) Iga Świątek	(Czech Republic) Barbora Krejčíková (Czech Republic) Kateřina Siniaková	4–6, 2–6

=== Mixed doubles: 6 (4 titles, 2 runner-ups) ===
Result	Year	Championship	Surface	Partner	Opponents	Score
Win	2012	Australian Open	Hard	(Romania) Horia Tecău	(Russia) Elena Vesnina (India) Leander Paes	6–3, 5–7, [10–3]
Win	2015	French Open	Clay	(United States) Mike Bryan	(Czech Republic) Lucie Hradecká (Poland) Marcin Matkowski	7–6^{(7–3)}, 6–1
Loss	2015	US Open	Hard	(United States) Sam Querrey	(Switzerland) Martina Hingis (India) Leander Paes	4–6, 6–3, [7–10]
Win	2018	US Open	Hard	(United Kingdom) Jamie Murray	(Poland) Alicja Rosolska (Croatia) Nikola Mektić	2–6, 6–3, [11–9]
Win	2019	US Open (2)	Hard	(United Kingdom) Jamie Murray	(Chinese Taipei) Chan Hao-ching (New Zealand) Michael Venus	6–2, 6–3
Loss	2020	Australian Open	Hard	(United Kingdom) Jamie Murray	(Czech Republic) Barbora Krejčíková (Croatia) Nikola Mektić	7–5, 4–6, [1–10]

== Other significant finals ==
=== WTA Tour Championships ===
==== Doubles: 1 (runner-up) ====
Result	Year	Tournament	Surface	Partner	Opponents	Score
Loss	2016	WTA Finals, Singapore	Hard (i)	(Czech Republic) Lucie Šafářová	(Russia) Ekaterina Makarova (Russia) Elena Vesnina	6–7^{(5–7)}, 3–6

=== WTA 1000 tournaments ===
==== Doubles: 8 (7 titles, 1 runner-up) ====
Result	Year	Tournament	Surface	Partner	Opponents	Score
Loss	2011	Indian Wells Open	Hard	(United States) Meghann Shaughnessy	(India) Sania Mirza (Russia) Elena Vesnina	0–6, 5–7
Win	2015	Canadian Open	Hard	(Czech Republic) Lucie Šafářová	(France) Caroline Garcia (Slovenia) Katarina Srebotnik	6–1, 6–2
Win	2016	Indian Wells Open	Hard	(United States) CoCo Vandeweghe	(Germany) Julia Görges (Czech Republic) Karolína Plíšková	4–6, 6–4, [10–6]
Win	2016	Miami Open	Hard	(Czech Republic) Lucie Šafářová	(Hungary) Tímea Babos (Kazakhstan) Yaroslava Shvedova	6–3, 6–4
Win	2016	Wuhan Open	Hard	(Czech Republic) Lucie Šafářová	(India) Sania Mirza (Czech Republic) Barbora Strýcová	6–1, 6–4
Win	2016	China Open	Hard	(Czech Republic) Lucie Šafářová	(France) Caroline Garcia (France) Kristina Mladenovic	6–4, 6–4
Win	2019	China Open (2)	Hard	(United States) Sofia Kenin	(Latvia) Jeļena Ostapenko (Ukraine) Dayana Yastremska	6–3, 6–7^{(5–7)}, [10–7]
Win	2024	Miami Open (2)	Hard	(United States) Sofia Kenin	(Canada) Gabriela Dabrowski (New Zealand) Erin Routliffe	4–6, 7–6^{(7–5)}, [11–9]

=== Olympic Games ===
==== Mixed doubles: 1 (gold medal) ====
Result	Year	Location	Surface	Partner	Opponents	Score
Gold	2016	Rio de Janeiro	Hard	(United States) Jack Sock	(United States) Venus Williams (United States) Rajeev Ram	6–7^{(3–7)}, 6–1, [10–7]

== WTA Tour finals ==
=== Singles: 4 (4 runner-ups) ===
Legend WTA 1000 (Tier I / Premier M & Premier 5) WTA 500 (Tier II / Premier) WTA 250 (Tier III, IV & V / International) (0–4)	Finals by surface Hard (0–2) Carpet (0–2)

Result	W–L	Date	Tournament	Tier	Surface	Opponent	Score
Loss	0–1	Nov 2008	Tournoi de Québec, Canada	International	Carpet (i)	(Russia) Nadia Petrova	6–4, 4–6, 1–6
Loss	0–2	Sep 2010	Tournoi de Québec, Canada	International	Carpet (i)	(Austria) Tamira Paszek	6–7^{(6–8)}, 6–2, 5–7
Loss	0–3	Jan 2011	Hobart International, Australia	International	Hard	(Australia) Jarmila Gajdošová	4–6, 3–6
Loss	0–4	Mar 2013	Malaysian Open, Malaysia	International	Hard	(Czech Republic) Karolína Plíšková	6–1, 5–7, 3–6

=== Doubles: 49 (30 titles, 19 runner-ups) ===
Legend Grand Slam (5–1) WTA Finals (0–1) WTA 1000 (Tier I / Premier M & Premier 5) (7–1) WTA 500 (Tier II / Premier) (13–8) WTA 250 (Tier III, IV & V / International) (5–8)	Finals by surface Hard (19–8) Clay (11–8) Grass (0–2) Carpet (0–1)

Result	W–L	Date	Tournament	Tier	Surface	Partner	Opponents	Score
Win	1–0	Aug 2004	Vancouver Open, Canada	Tier V	Hard	(United States) Abigail Spears	(Belgium) Els Callens; (Germany) Anna-Lena Grönefeld	6–3, 6–3
Loss	1–1	Aug 2005	LA Championships, US	Tier II	Hard	(United States) Angela Haynes	(Russia) Elena Dementieva; (Italy) Flavia Pennetta	2–6, 4–6
Loss	1–2	May 2006	Prague Open, Czech Republic	Tier IV	Clay	(United States) Ashley Harkleroad	(France) Marion Bartoli; (Israel) Shahar Pe'er	4–6, 4–6
Loss	1–3	May 2006	Rabat Grand Prix, Morocco	Tier IV	Clay	(United States) Ashley Harkleroad	(China) Yan Zi; (China) Zheng Jie	1–6, 3–6
Win	2–3	Jul 2007	Cincinnati Open, US	Tier III	Hard	(India) Sania Mirza	(Russia) Alina Jidkova; (Belarus) Tatiana Poutchek	7–6^{(7–4)}, 7–5
Win	3–3	Feb 2008	Copa Colsanitas, Colombia	Tier III	Clay	(Czech Republic) Iveta Benešová	(Croatia) Jelena Kostanić Tošić; (Germany) Martina Müller	6–3, 6–3
Win	4–3	Apr 2008	Amelia Island Championships, US	Tier II	Clay	(Czech Republic) Vladimíra Uhlířová	(Belarus) Victoria Azarenka; (Russia) Elena Vesnina	6–3, 6–1
Win	5–3	Apr 2009	Charleston Open, US	Premier	Clay	(Russia) Nadia Petrova	(Latvia) Līga Dekmeijere; (Switzerland) Patty Schnyder	6–7^{(5–7)}, 6–2, [11–9]
Win	6–3	May 2009	Stuttgart Grand Prix, Germany	Premier	Clay (i)	(Russia) Nadia Petrova	(Argentina) Gisela Dulko (Italy) Flavia Pennetta	5–7, 6–3, [10–7]
Win	7–3	May 2009	Warsaw Open, Poland	Premier	Clay	(United States) Raquel Atawo	(China) Yan Zi (China) Zheng Jie	6–1, 6–1
Loss	7–4	Feb 2010	National Indoor Championships, US	International	Hard (i)	(United States) Meghann Shaughnessy	(United States) Vania King; (Netherlands) Michaëlla Krajicek	5–7, 2–6
Win	8–4	Apr 2010	Amelia Island Championships, US (2)	International	Clay	(China) Yan Zi	(Chinese Taipei) Chuang Chia-jung; (China) Peng Shuai	4–6, 6–4, [10–8]
Loss	8–5	Jun 2010	Birmingham Classic, UK	International	Grass	(United States) Liezel Huber	(Zimbabwe) Cara Black; (United States) Lisa Raymond	3–6, 2–3 ret.
Loss	8–6	Aug 2010	Connecticut Open, US	Premier	Hard	(United States) Meghann Shaughnessy	(Czech Republic) Květa Peschke; (Slovenia) Katarina Srebotnik	5–7, 0–6
Loss	8–7	Sep 2010	Tournoi de Québec, Canada	International	Carpet (i)	(Czech Republic) Barbora Strýcová	(Sweden) Sofia Arvidsson; (Sweden) Johanna Larsson	1–6, 6–2, [6–10]
Win	9–7	Feb 2011	Open GDF Suez, France	Premier	Hard (i)	(United States) Meghann Shaughnessy	(Russia) Vera Dushevina; (Russia) Ekaterina Makarova	6–4, 6–2
Loss	9–8	Mar 2011	Indian Wells Open, US	Premier M	Hard	(United States) Meghann Shaughnessy	(India) Sania Mirza (Russia) Elena Vesnina	0–6, 5–7
Loss	9–9	Apr 2011	Charleston Open, US	Premier	Clay	(United States) Meghann Shaughnessy	(India) Sania Mirza (Russia) Elena Vesnina	4–6, 4–6
Win	10–9	May 2012	Brussels Open, Belgium	Premier	Clay	(India) Sania Mirza	(Poland) Alicja Rosolska (China) Zheng Jie	6–3, 6–2
Win	11–9	Jan 2013	Brisbane International, Australia	Premier	Hard	(India) Sania Mirza	(Germany) Anna-Lena Grönefeld (Czech Republic) Květa Peschke	4–6, 6–4, [10–7]
Win	12–9	Feb 2013	Dubai Championships, UAE	Premier	Hard	(India) Sania Mirza	(Russia) Nadia Petrova (Slovenia) Katarina Srebotnik	6–4, 2–6, [10–7]
Loss	12–10	Apr 2013	Stuttgart Grand Prix, Germany	Premier	Clay (i)	(India) Sania Mirza	(Germany) Mona Barthel; (Germany) Sabine Lisicki	4–6, 5–7
Win	13–10	Jan 2015	Sydney International, Australia	Premier	Hard	(India) Sania Mirza	(United States) Raquel Atawo (United States) Abigail Spears	6–3, 6–3
Win	14–10	Jan 2015	Australian Open, Australia	Grand Slam	Hard	(Czech Republic) Lucie Šafářová	(Chinese Taipei) Chan Yung-jan (China) Zheng Jie	6–4, 7–6^{(7–5)}
Win	15–10	Apr 2015	Stuttgart Grand Prix, Germany (2)	Premier	Clay (i)	(Czech Republic) Lucie Šafářová	(France) Caroline Garcia (Slovenia) Katarina Srebotnik	6–4, 6–3
Win	16–10	Jun 2015	French Open, France	Grand Slam	Clay	(Czech Republic) Lucie Šafářová	(Australia) Casey Dellacqua; (Kazakhstan) Yaroslava Shvedova	3–6, 6–4, 6–2
Win	17–10	Aug 2015	Canadian Open, Canada	Premier 5	Hard	(Czech Republic) Lucie Šafářová	(France) Caroline Garcia (Slovenia) Katarina Srebotnik	6–1, 6–2
Win	18–10	Mar 2016	Indian Wells Open, US	Premier M	Hard	(United States) CoCo Vandeweghe	(Germany) Julia Görges; (Czech Republic) Karolína Plíšková	4–6, 6–4, [10–6]
Win	19–10	Apr 2016	Miami Open, US	Premier M	Hard	(Czech Republic) Lucie Šafářová	(Hungary) Tímea Babos (Kazakhstan) Yaroslava Shvedova	6–3, 6–4
Loss	19–11	Apr 2016	Charleston Open, US	Premier	Clay	(Czech Republic) Lucie Šafářová	(France) Caroline Garcia (France) Kristina Mladenovic	2–6, 5–7
Win	20–11	Sep 2016	US Open, United States	Grand Slam	Hard	(Czech Republic) Lucie Šafářová	(France) Caroline Garcia (France) Kristina Mladenovic	2–6, 7–6^{(7–5)}, 6–4
Win	21–11	Oct 2016	Wuhan Open, China	Premier 5	Hard	(Czech Republic) Lucie Šafářová	(Czech Republic) Barbora Strýcová (India) Sania Mirza	6–1, 6–4
Win	22–11	Oct 2016	China Open, China	Premier M	Hard	(Czech Republic) Lucie Šafářová	(France) Caroline Garcia (France) Kristina Mladenovic	6–4, 6–4
Loss	22–12	Oct 2016	WTA Finals, Singapore	Tour Finals	Hard (i)	(Czech Republic) Lucie Šafářová	(Russia) Ekaterina Makarova (Russia) Elena Vesnina	6–7^{(5–7)}, 3–6
Win	23–12	Jan 2017	Brisbane International, Australia (2)	Premier	Hard	(India) Sania Mirza	(Russia) Ekaterina Makarova (Russia) Elena Vesnina	6–2, 6–3
Win	24–12	Jan 2017	Australian Open, Australia (2)	Grand Slam	Hard	(Czech Republic) Lucie Šafářová	(Czech Republic) Andrea Hlaváčková (China) Peng Shuai	6–7^{(4–7)}, 6–3, 6–3
Win	25–12	Apr 2017	Charleston Open, US (2)	Premier	Clay	(Czech Republic) Lucie Šafářová	(Czech Republic) Lucie Hradecká; (Czech Republic) Kateřina Siniaková	6–1, 4–6, [10–7]
Win	26–12	Jun 2017	French Open, France (2)	Grand Slam	Clay	(Czech Republic) Lucie Šafářová	(Australia) Ashleigh Barty (Australia) Casey Dellacqua	6–2, 6–1
Loss	26–13	Jun 2019	Eastbourne International, UK	Premier	Grass	(Belgium) Kirsten Flipkens	(Chinese Taipei) Chan Hao-ching (Chinese Taipei) Latisha Chan	6–2, 3–6, [6–10]
Win	27–13	Oct 2019	China Open, China (2)	Premier M	Hard	(United States) Sofia Kenin	(Latvia) Jeļena Ostapenko (Ukraine) Dayana Yastremska	6–3, 6–7^{(5–7)}, [10–7]
Loss	27–14	Oct 2019	Kremlin Cup, Russia	Premier	Hard (i)	(Belgium) Kirsten Flipkens	(Japan) Shuko Aoyama (Japan) Ena Shibahara	1–6, 2–6
Loss	27–15	Apr 2021	Stuttgart Grand Prix, Germany	WTA 500	Clay (i)	(United States) Desirae Krawczyk	(Australia) Ashleigh Barty (United States) Jennifer Brady	4–6, 7–5, [5–10]
Loss	27–16	Jun 2021	French Open, France	Grand Slam	Clay	(Poland) Iga Świątek	(Czech Republic) Barbora Krejčíková (Czech Republic) Kateřina Siniaková	4–6, 2–6
Loss	27–17	Jan 2023	Auckland Open, New Zealand	WTA 250	Hard	(Canada) Leylah Fernandez	(Japan) Miyu Kato (Indonesia) Aldila Sutjiadi	6–1, 5–7, [4–10]
Win	28–17	Oct 2023	Korea Open, South Korea	WTA 250	Hard	(Czech Republic) Marie Bouzková	(Thailand) Luksika Kumkhum (Thailand) Peangtarn Plipuech	6–2, 6–1
Loss	28–18	Jan 2024	Auckland Open, New Zealand	WTA 250	Hard	(Czech Republic) Marie Bouzková	(Kazakhstan) Anna Danilina (Slovakia) Viktória Hrunčáková	3–6, 7–6^{(7–5)}, [8–10]
Win	29–18	Feb 2024	Abu Dhabi Open, UAE	WTA 500	Hard	(United States) Sofia Kenin	(Czech Republic) Linda Nosková (United Kingdom) Heather Watson	6–4, 7–6^{(7–4)}
Win	30–18	Mar 2024	Miami Open, US (2)	WTA 1000	Hard	(United States) Sofia Kenin	(Canada) Gabriela Dabrowski (New Zealand) Erin Routliffe	4–6, 7–6^{(7–5)}, [11–9]
Loss	30–19	Jul 2024	Prague Open, Czech Republic	WTA 250	Clay	(Czech Republic) Lucie Šafářová	(Czech Republic) Barbora Krejčíková (Czech Republic) Kateřina Siniaková	3–6, 3–6

== ITF Circuit finals ==
=== Singles: 9 (5–4) ===
Legend $75,000 tournaments (1–1) $50,000 tournaments (4–3)	Finals by surface Hard (3–2) Clay (2–2)

Result	W–L	Date	Tournament	Tier	Surface	Opponent	Score
Loss	0–1	Dec 2002	ITF Boynton Beach, United States	75,000	Clay	(Ukraine) Julia Vakulenko	4–6, 0–6
Win	1–1	Jan 2003	ITF Fullerton, United States	50,000	Hard	(Netherlands) Seda Noorlander	6–4, 3–6, 6–4
Loss	1–2	Jul 2003	ITF Oyster Bay, United States	50,000	Hard	(Germany) Anna-Lena Grönefeld	3–6, 0–6
Win	2–2	Jul 2004	ITF Schenectady, United States	50,000	Hard	(Canada) Maureen Drake	6–3, 6–1
Win	3–2	Dec 2005	Palm Beach Gardens Challenger, United States	50,000	Clay	(Hungary) Melinda Czink	4–6, 6–4, 6–4
Loss	3–3	Oct 2006	ITF Houston, United States	50,000	Hard	(Hungary) Ágnes Szávay	6–2, 4–6, 1–6
Win	4–3	Msy 2007	ITF Indian Harbour Beach, United States	50,000	Clay	(Belarus) Olga Govortsova	7–5, 1–6, 6–1
Win	5–3	Apr 2008	Dothan Pro Classic, United States	75,000	Clay	(United States) Varvara Lepchenko	6–2, 7–6^{(3)}
Loss	5–4	May 2008	ITF Indian Harbour Beach, United States	50,000	Clay	(Belgium) Yanina Wickmayer	4–6, 6–7^{(5)}

== Junior Grand Slam tournament finals ==
=== Doubles: 1 (runner-up) ===
Result	Year	Tournament	Surface	Partner	Opponents	Score
Loss	2001	Wimbledon	Grass	(Australia) Christina Horiatopoulos	(Argentina) Gisela Dulko (United States) Ashley Harkleroad	3–6, 1–6

== Top-10 wins per season ==
#	Player	Rank	Event	Surface	Round	Score
2008
1.	(France) Marion Bartoli	No. 10	Wimbledon, UK	Grass	3rd round	6–4, 6–1
2011
2.	(Italy) Francesca Schiavone	No. 4	Madrid, Spain	Clay	3rd round	7–6^{(5)}, 6–3
2013
3.	(Italy) Sara Errani	No. 7	Stuttgart, Germany	Clay (i)	2nd round	6–0, 4–6, 6–1
4.	(China) Li Na	No. 6	French Open	Clay	2nd round	5–7, 6–3, 6–2
2014
5.	(Poland) Agnieszka Radwańska	No. 5	Sydney, Australia	Hard	2nd round	7–5, 6–2
2015
6.	(Serbia) Ana Ivanovic	No. 7	Wimbledon, UK	Grass	2nd round	6–3, 6–4
2017
7.	(Ukraine) Elina Svitolina	No. 10	Miami, United States	Hard	2nd round	7–5, 6–4

== World TeamTennis ==
Mattek-Sands has played three seasons with World TeamTennis, making her debut in 2000 with the Hartford FoxForce, later playing a season with the Sacramento Capitals in 2006, and the New York Sportimes in 2008. Mattek-Sands joined the Chicago Smash for their inaugural season during the 2020 WTT season at The Greenbrier. The team advanced to the final as the second seed with a win over the Orlando Storm in the semifinals, but ultimately fell in the Championship match to the New York Empire in a Supertiebreaker. Mattek-Sands was named the 2020 WTT MVP due to her doubles play throughout the season.
