= 2003 Pilot Pen Tennis =

Women's tennis tournament

- Date: August 17–23
- Edition: 21st
- Category: Tier II
- Draw: 28S / 16D
- Prize money: USD 625,000
- Surface: Hard / outdoor
- Location: New Haven, Connecticut, U.S.
- Venue: Cullman-Heyman Tennis Center

Champions

Singles
- (United States) Jennifer Capriati

Doubles
- (Spain) Virginia Ruano Pascual (Argentina) Paola Suárez
- Connecticut Open

The 2003 Pilot Pen Tennis was a women's tennis tournament played on outdoor hard courts. It was the 21st edition of the Pilot Pen Tennis and was part of the Tier II Series of the 2003 WTA Tour. It took place at the Cullman-Heyman Tennis Center in New Haven, United States, from August 17 through August 23, 2003. Third-seeded Jennifer Capriati won the singles title and earned $96,000 first-prize money as well as 195 ranking points.

== Finals ==
=== Singles ===
- (United States) Jennifer Capriati defeated (United States) Lindsay Davenport 6–2, 4–0, retired.

=== Doubles ===
- (Spain) Virginia Ruano Pascual / (Argentina) Paola Suárez defeated (Australia) Alicia Molik / (Spain) Magüi Serna 7–6^{(8–6)}, 6–3
