= 2005 Pilot Pen Tennis – Men's doubles =

Men's doubles for 2005 Pilot Pen Tennis

Men's doubles
- 2005 Pilot Pen Tennis

Final
- Champions: (Argentina) Gastón Etlis (Argentina) Martín Rodríguez
- Runners-up: (United States) Rajeev Ram (United States) Bobby Reynolds
- Score: 6–4, 6–3

Events
Singles	men	women
Doubles	men	women
← 2004 ·	Pilot Pen Tennis	· 2006 →

Antony Dupuis and Michaël Llodra were the defending champions, but Dupuis did not compete this year. Llodra partnered with Fabrice Santoro and lost in Quarterfinals to Gastón Etlis and Martín Rodríguez.

Etlis and Rodríguez won the title, defeating Rajeev Ram and Bobby Reynolds 6–4, 6–3 in the final.

== Seeds ==
1. (India) Leander Paes / (Serbia and Montenegro) Nenad Zimonjić (first round)
2. (India) Mahesh Bhupathi / (Czech Republic) Martin Damm (first round)
3. (France) Michaël Llodra / (France) Fabrice Santoro (quarterfinals)
4. (Czech Republic) František Čermák / (Czech Republic) Leoš Friedl (first round)

== Draw ==
=== Key ===
- Q = Qualifier
- WC = Wild card
- LL = Lucky loser
- Alt = Alternate
- SE = Special exempt
- PR = Protected ranking
- ITF = ITF entry
- JE = Junior exempt
- w/o = Walkover
- r = Retired
- d = Defaulted
- SR = Special ranking

=== Draw ===
First round
1	(India) L Paes (Serbia and Montenegro) N Zimonjić	4	6^{4}
(Germany) T Haas (Austria) J Melzer	6	7^{7}
(Chile) F González (Chile) N Massú	4	2
(Belgium) C Rochus (Belgium) O Rochus	6	6
3	(France) M Llodra (France) F Santoro	7	6
(Czech Republic) C Suk (Czech Republic) P Vízner	5	3
(Argentina) G Etlis (Argentina) M Rodríguez	6	6^{2}	6
(Sweden) S Aspelin (Australia) T Perry	2	7^{7}	3
WC	(United States) R Ram (United States) B Reynolds	6^{1}	6	7^{7}
(Russia) I Andreev (Spain) D Ferrer	7^{7}	3	6^{5}
(Switzerland) Y Allegro (Austria) J Knowle	6	7
4	(Czech Republic) F Čermák (Czech Republic) L Friedl	3	5
WC	(United States) J Gimelstob (United States) J Thomas	4	6	6
(Czech Republic) P Pála (United States) V Spadea	6	1	4
(Israel) J Erlich (Israel) A Ram	1	6	6
2	(India) M Bhupathi (Czech Republic) M Damm	6	1	4

Quarterfinals
(Germany) T Haas (Austria) J Melzer	6	7
(Belgium) C Rochus (Belgium) O Rochus	4	5
3	(France) M Llodra (France) F Santoro	4	6	5
(Argentina) G Etlis (Argentina) M Rodríguez	6	3	7
WC	(United States) R Ram (United States) B Reynolds	7	2	6
(Switzerland) Y Allegro (Austria) J Knowle	5	6	3
WC	(United States) J Gimelstob (United States) J Thomas	1	6	6
(Israel) J Erlich (Israel) A Ram	6	2	4

Semifinals
(Germany) T Haas (Austria) J Melzer
(Argentina) G Etlis (Argentina) M Rodríguez	w/o
WC	(United States) R Ram (United States) B Reynolds	7^{7}	4	7^{7}
WC	(United States) J Gimelstob (United States) J Thomas	6^{3}	6	6^{5}

Final
(Argentina) G Etlis (Argentina) M Rodríguez	6	6
WC	(United States) R Ram (United States) B Reynolds	4	3
