= 2006 Pilot Pen Tennis – Men's singles =

Men's singles
- 2006 Pilot Pen Tennis

Final
- Champion: (Russia) Nikolay Davydenko
- Runner-up: (Argentina) Agustín Calleri
- Score: 6–4, 6–3

Details
- Draw: 48
- Seeds: 16

Events
Singles	men	women
Doubles	men	women
← 2005 ·	Pilot Pen Tennis	· 2007 →

James Blake was the defending champion, but lost to Rubén Ramírez Hidalgo in the second round.

Nikolay Davydenko won the title, defeating Agustín Calleri 6–4, 6–3 in the final.

== Seeds ==
All seeds receive a bye into the second round.

1. (United States) James Blake (second round)
2. (Russia) Nikolay Davydenko (champion)
3. (Cyprus) Marcos Baghdatis (third round)
4. (Finland) Jarkko Nieminen (third round)
5. (Spain) David Ferrer (third round)
6. (Argentina) José Acasuso (third round)
7. (Spain) Fernando Verdasco (third round, retired due to an ankle injury)
8. (Belgium) Olivier Rochus (quarterfinals)
9. (France) Gaël Monfils (third round)
10. (Argentina) Agustín Calleri (final)
11. (Sweden) Jonas Björkman (withdrew due to a back injury)
12. (Argentina) Juan Ignacio Chela (quarterfinals)
13. (Belgium) Xavier Malisse (semifinals, retired due to an elbow injury)
14. (Chile) Nicolás Massú (quarterfinals)
15. (Sweden) Robin Söderling (semifinals)
16. (Thailand) Paradorn Srichaphan (third round)

== Draw ==
=== Key ===
- Q = Qualifier
- WC = Wild card
- LL = Lucky loser
- Alt = Alternate
- SE = Special exempt
- PR = Protected ranking
- ITF = ITF entry
- JE = Junior exempt
- w/o = Walkover
- r = Retired
- d = Defaulted
- SR = Special ranking

=== Finals ===
Quarterfinals
13	(Belgium) Xavier Malisse	4	6	6
12	(Argentina) Juan Ignacio Chela	6	4	2
14	(Chile) Nicolás Massú	3	6	4
10	(Argentina) Agustín Calleri	6	3	6
LL	(Austria) Jürgen Melzer	3	2
15	(Sweden) Robin Söderling	6	6
8	(Belgium) Olivier Rochus	4	2
2	(Russia) Nikolay Davydenko	6	6

Semifinals
13	(Belgium) Xavier Malisse	2	0^{r}
10	(Argentina) Agustín Calleri	6	0
15	(Sweden) Robin Söderling	6^{6}	2
2	(Russia) Nikolay Davydenko	7^{8}	6

Final
10	(Argentina) Agustín Calleri	4	3
2	(Russia) Nikolay Davydenko	6	6

=== Top half ===
==== Section 1 ====
First round
(Spain) R Ramírez Hidalgo	6	7
(Belgium) C Rochus	3	5
(Czech Republic) R Vik	6	6
(France) F Santoro	4	2
(Germany) B Phau	1	1
(Italy) A Seppi	6	6
(Italy) D Bracciali	5	6^{2}
(France) N Mahut	7	7^{7}

Second round
1	(United States) J Blake	6	6^{6}	6^{4}
(Spain) R Ramírez Hidalgo	2	7^{8}	7^{7}
(Czech Republic) R Vik	1	6	3
13	(Belgium) X Malisse	6	4	6
12	(Argentina) JI Chela	6	6
(Italy) A Seppi	3	2
(France) N Mahut	5	3^{r}
6	(Argentina) J Acasuso	7	3

Third round
(Spain) R Ramírez Hidalgo	1	3
13	(Belgium) X Malisse	6	6
12	(Argentina) JI Chela	7^{7}	6
6	(Argentina) J Acasuso	6^{1}	2

Quarterfinals
13	(Belgium) X Malisse	4	6	6
12	(Argentina) JI Chela	6	4	2

==== Section 2 ====
First round
(Croatia) I Karlović	6^{2}	7^{9}	2
(United Kingdom) G Rusedski	7^{7}	6^{7}	6
(Luxembourg) G Müller	3	6	6^{3}
(Serbia) B Pašanski	6	2	7^{7}
(Belarus) M Mirnyi	6	7^{8}
(France) P-H Mathieu	2	6^{6}
(United States) M Fish	6	6
(Italy) D Sanguinetti	3	3

Second round
4	(Finland) J Nieminen	7^{7}	6
(United Kingdom) G Rusedski	6^{2}	4
(Serbia) B Pašanski	3	6^{4}
14	(Chile) N Massú	6	7^{7}
10	(Argentina) A Calleri	7^{7}	6
(Belarus) M Mirnyi	6^{4}	3
(United States) M Fish	2	6	6^{5}
5	(Spain) D Ferrer	6	2	7^{7}

Third round
4	(Finland) J Nieminen	3	4
14	(Chile) N Massú	6	6
10	(Argentina) A Calleri	6	6
5	(Spain) D Ferrer	3	1

Quarterfinals
14	(Chile) N Massú	3	6	4
10	(Argentina) A Calleri	6	3	6

=== Bottom half ===
==== Section 3 ====
First round
(France) J Benneteau	7^{7}	2	6
(Peru) L Horna	6^{3}	6	1
(Italy) F Volandri	3	4
(Spain) F López	6	6
WC	(United States) S Querrey	6	6
(Spain) A Martín	3	2
Q	(Germany) M Berrer	7	6
Q	(United States) R Sweeting	5	2

Second round
7	(Spain) F Verdasco	7^{7}	6
(France) J Benneteau	6^{4}	4
(Spain) F López	7^{7}	6^{1}	4
LL	(Austria) J Melzer	6^{3}	7^{7}	6
15	(Sweden) R Söderling	6	4	6
WC	(United States) S Querrey	3	6	1
Q	(Germany) M Berrer	6^{5}	6^{6}
3/WC	(Cyprus) M Baghdatis	7^{7}	7^{8}

Third round
7	(Spain) F Verdasco	4	1^{r}
LL	(Austria) J Melzer	6	4
15	(Sweden) R Söderling	6	6^{3}	7
3/WC	(Cyprus) M Baghdatis	3	7^{7}	5

Quarterfinals
LL	(Austria) J Melzer	3	2
15	(Sweden) R Söderling	6	6

==== Section 4 ====
First round
WC	(United States) J Gimelstob	6	5	1
(France) G Simon	4	7	6
Q	(Czech Republic) J Hájek	6^{3}	3
Q	(France) M Gicquel	7^{7}	6
(Spain) N Almagro	3	7^{7}	4
(Switzerland) S Wawrinka	6	6^{5}	6
(France) A Clément	6	6
(France) F Serra	4	1

Second round
8	(Belgium) O Rochus	4	6	6
(France) G Simon	6	4	3
Q	(France) M Gicquel	6^{6}	4
9/WC	(France) G Monfils	7^{8}	6
16	(Thailand) P Srichaphan	7^{7}	4	6
(Switzerland) S Wawrinka	6^{2}	6	4
(France) A Clément	2	1
2	(Russia) N Davydenko	6	6

Third round
8	(Belgium) O Rochus	6	6
9/WC	(France) G Monfils	4	3
16	(Thailand) P Srichaphan	4	1
2	(Russia) N Davydenko	6	6

Quarterfinals
8	(Belgium) O Rochus	4	2
2	(Russia) N Davydenko	6	6
