= 2005 Pilot Pen Tennis – Women's doubles =

Women's doubles for 2005 Pilot Pen Tennis

Women's doubles
- 2005 Pilot Pen Tennis

Final
- Champions: (United States) Lisa Raymond (Australia) Samantha Stosur
- Runners-up: (Argentina) Gisela Dulko (Russia) Maria Kirilenko
- Score: 6–2, 6–7^{(6–8)}, 6–1

Events
Singles	men	women
Doubles	men	women
← 2004 ·	Pilot Pen Tennis	· 2006 →

Nadia Petrova and Meghann Shaughnessy were the defending champions, but Petrova had to forfeit the tournament due to a right pectoralis strain. Shaughnessy competed alongside Anna-Lena Grönefeld, but the pair withdrew in quarterfinals against Eleni Daniilidou and Jennifer Russell.

Lisa Raymond and Samantha Stosur won the title, defeating Gisela Dulko and Maria Kirilenko 6–2, 6–7^{(6–8)}, 6–1 in the final.

== Seeds ==
1. (Australia) Alicia Molik / (United States) Corina Morariu (first round)
2. (Germany) Anna-Lena Grönefeld / (United States) Meghann Shaughnessy (quarterfinals, withdrew due to a left knee injury on Shaughnessy)
3. (United States) Lisa Raymond / (Australia) Samantha Stosur (champions)
4. (Spain) Anabel Medina Garrigues / (Russia) Dinara Safina (quarterfinals)

== Draw ==
=== Key ===
- Q = Qualifier
- WC = Wild card
- LL = Lucky loser
- Alt = Alternate
- SE = Special exempt
- PR = Protected ranking
- ITF = ITF entry
- JE = Junior exempt
- w/o = Walkover
- r = Retired
- d = Defaulted
- SR = Special ranking

=== Draw ===
First round
1	(Australia) A Molik (United States) C Morariu	6^{4}	3
WC	(France) N Dechy (France) A Mauresmo	7^{7}	6
(Slovenia) T Križan (China) J Zheng	7	6
WC	(Australia) L McShea (United States) A Spears	5	2
4	(Spain) A Medina Garrigues (Russia) D Safina	6	7
(Czech Republic) K Peschke (Czech Republic) B Strýcová	1	5
(Argentina) G Dulko (Russia) M Kirilenko	6	6
(France) S Cohen-Aloro (Slovakia) J Husárová	3	2
(Russia) E Likhovtseva (Bulgaria) M Maleeva	6^{5}	6	6
(Slovenia) K Srebotnik (Australia) B Stewart	7^{7}	4	2
(France) É Loit (Australia) N Pratt	6^{6}	5
3	(United States) L Raymond (Australia) S Stosur	7^{8}	7
(Croatia) J Kostanić (Chinese Taipei) J Lee	4	1
Q	(Greece) E Daniilidou (United States) J Russell	6	6
(Italy) T Garbin (Italy) M Santangelo	3	4
2	(Germany) A-L Grönefeld (United States) M Shaughnessy	6	6

Quarterfinals
WC	(France) N Dechy (France) A Mauresmo	6	3	6
(Slovenia) T Križan (China) J Zheng	3	6	3
4	(Spain) A Medina Garrigues (Russia) D Safina	6	3	4
(Argentina) G Dulko (Russia) M Kirilenko	3	6	6
(Russia) E Likhovtseva (Bulgaria) M Maleeva	7^{8}	3	3
3	(United States) L Raymond (Australia) S Stosur	6^{6}	6	6
Q	(Greece) E Daniilidou (United States) J Russell	w/o
2	(Germany) A-L Grönefeld (United States) M Shaughnessy

Semifinals
WC	(France) N Dechy (France) A Mauresmo
(Argentina) G Dulko (Russia) M Kirilenko	w/o
3	(United States) L Raymond (Australia) S Stosur	5	6	6
Q	(Greece) E Daniilidou (United States) J Russell	7	3	4

Final
(Argentina) G Dulko (Russia) M Kirilenko	2	7^{8}	1
3	(United States) L Raymond (Australia) S Stosur	6	6^{6}	6
