= 2004 Pilot Pen Tennis – Doubles =

Doubles
- 2004 Pilot Pen Tennis

Final
- Champions: (Russia) Nadia Petrova (United States) Meghann Shaughnessy
- Runners-up: (United States) Martina Navratilova (United States) Lisa Raymond
- Score: 6–1, 1–6, 7–6^{(7–4)}

Events
Singles	Doubles
← 2003 ·	Pilot Pen Tennis	· 2005 →

Virginia Ruano Pascual and Paola Suárez were the defending champions, but did not compete this year.

Nadia Petrova and Meghann Shaughnessy won the title by defeating Martina Navratilova and Lisa Raymond 6–1, 1–6, 7–6^{(7–4)} in the final. It was the 10th doubles title for both players in their respective doubles careers. It was also the 6th title for the pair during the season, after their wins in Miami, Amelia Island, Berlin, Rome and Los Angeles.

== Seeds ==
1. (Zimbabwe) Cara Black / (Australia) Rennae Stubbs (semifinals)
2. (Russia) Nadia Petrova / (United States) Meghann Shaughnessy (champions)
3. (United States) Martina Navratilova / (United States) Lisa Raymond (final)
4. (Australia) Alicia Molik / (Spain) Magüi Serna (semifinals)

== Draw ==
=== Key ===
- Q = Qualifier
- WC = Wild card
- LL = Lucky loser
- Alt = Alternate
- SE = Special exempt
- PR = Protected ranking
- ITF = ITF entry
- JE = Junior exempt
- w/o = Walkover
- r = Retired
- d = Defaulted
- SR = Special ranking

=== Draw ===
First round
1	(Zimbabwe) C Black (Australia) R Stubbs	4	6	6
(United States) M Washington (Germany) M Weingärtner	6	4	4
(Australia) B Stewart (Australia) S Stosur	5	6^{2}
(Croatia) J Kostanić (Luxembourg) C Schaul	7	7^{7}
3	(United States) M Navratilova (United States) L Raymond	2	6	6
(France) C Dhenin (Croatia) S Talaja	6	2	4
Q	(Japan) A Morigami (United States) S Perry	2	0
(Spain) M Marrero (Slovakia) H Nagyová	6	6
WC	(United States) A Haynes (United States) A Stevenson	6^{7}	1
(Belgium) E Callens (Switzerland) E Gagliardi	7^{9}	6
(United States) J Russell (Italy) M Santangelo	4	6	3
4	(Australia) A Molik (Spain) M Serna	6	4	6
(Russia) M Kirilenko (Russia) M Sharapova	6^{9}	3
(Slovakia) D Hantuchová (Russia) D Safina	7^{11}	6
(Italy) R Grande (Italy) F Pennetta	2	6	1
2	(Russia) N Petrova (United States) M Shaughnessy	6	4	6

Quarterfinals
1	(Zimbabwe) C Black (Australia) R Stubbs	6	6
(Croatia) J Kostanić (Luxembourg) C Schaul	3	3
3	(United States) M Navratilova (United States) L Raymond	6	7^{7}
(Spain) M Marrero (Slovakia) H Nagyová	1	6^{4}
(Belgium) E Callens (Switzerland) E Gagliardi	5	6^{1}
4	(Australia) A Molik (Spain) M Serna	7	7^{7}
(Slovakia) D Hantuchová (Russia) D Safina	6	3	2
2	(Russia) N Petrova (United States) M Shaughnessy	1	6	6

Semifinals
1	(Zimbabwe) C Black (Australia) R Stubbs	6^{4}	4
3	(United States) M Navratilova (United States) L Raymond	7^{7}	6
4	(Australia) A Molik (Spain) M Serna	1	6	3
2	(Russia) N Petrova (United States) M Shaughnessy	6	0	6

Final
3	(United States) M Navratilova (United States) L Raymond	1	6	6^{4}
2	(Russia) N Petrova (United States) M Shaughnessy	6	1	7^{7}
