= 2015 Connecticut Open =

- Date: August 23–29
- Edition: 47th
- Category: WTA Premier
- Draw: 30S / 16D
- Prize money: $731,000
- Surface: Hard / outdoor
- Location: New Haven, Connecticut, United States
- Venue: Cullman-Heyman Tennis Center

Champions

Singles
- (Czech Republic) Petra Kvitová

Doubles
- (Germany) Julia Görges / (Czech Republic) Lucie Hradecká
← 2014 ·	Connecticut Open	· 2016 →

The 2015 Connecticut Open was a women's tennis tournament played on outdoor hard courts. It was the 47th edition of the Connecticut Open, and part of the Premier Series of the 2015 WTA Tour. It took place at the Cullman-Heyman Tennis Center in New Haven, Connecticut, United States, from August 23 through August 29. It was the last event of the 2015 US Open Series before the 2015 US Open.

== Points and prize money ==
=== Point distribution ===
Event	W	F	SF	QF	Round of 16	Round of 32	Q	Q3	Q2	Q1
Singles	470	305	185	100	55	1	25	18	13	1
Doubles	470	305	185	100	1	—	—	—	—	—

=== Prize money ===
Event	W	F	SF	QF	Round of 16	Round of 32	Q3	Q2	Q1
Singles	$128,250	$68,385	$36,185	$19,470	$10,366	$5,755	$2,360	$1,080	$675
Doubles	$40,600	$21,380	$11,760	$5,985	$3,240	—	—	—	—

== Singles main-draw entrants ==
=== Seeds ===
Country	Player	Rank*	Seed
~~ROU~~	~~Simona Halep~~	~~3~~	~~1~~
CZE	Petra Kvitová	4	2
DEN	Caroline Wozniacki	5	3
CZE	Lucie Šafářová	6	4
CZE	Karolína Plíšková	7	5
SUI	Timea Bacsinszky	14	6
POL	Agnieszka Radwańska	15	7
ITA	Sara Errani	16	8

- Rankings are as of August 17, 2015

=== Other entrants ===
The following players received wildcards into the singles main draw:

- (Poland) Agnieszka Radwańska
- (United States) Alison Riske
- (Czech Republic) Lucie Šafářová
- (Denmark) Caroline Wozniacki

The following player received entry using a protected ranking:

- (Slovakia) Dominika Cibulková

The following players received entry from the qualifying draw:

- (Belarus) Olga Govortsova
- (Slovenia) Polona Hercog
- (Kazakhstan) Yulia Putintseva
- (Slovakia) Magdaléna Rybáriková
- (Ukraine) Olga Savchuk
- (Italy) Roberta Vinci

The following player received entry as a lucky loser:

- (Ukraine) Lesia Tsurenko

=== Withdrawals ===
Before the tournament

- (Switzerland) Belinda Bencic → replaced by (Russia) Daria Gavrilova
- (Romania) Simona Halep (Left thigh injury) → replaced by (Ukraine) Lesia Tsurenko
- (Russia) Ekaterina Makarova → replaced by (Czech Republic) Barbora Strýcová
- (United States) Sloane Stephens → replaced by (Bulgaria) Tsvetana Pironkova

=== Retirements ===
- (Belarus) Olga Govortsova
- (Ukraine) Elina Svitolina

== Doubles main-draw entrants ==
=== Seeds ===
Country	Player	Country	Player	Rank*	Seed
SLO	Katarina Srebotnik	RUS	Elena Vesnina	14	1
USA	Raquel Kops-Jones	USA	Abigail Spears	31	2
TPE	Chan Hao-ching	AUS	Casey Dellacqua	48	3
GER	Julia Görges	CZE	Lucie Hradecká	60	4

- Rankings are as of August 17, 2015

=== Other entrants ===
The following pair received a wildcard into the doubles main draw:

- (United States) Lauren Davis / (United States) Alison Riske

== Finals ==
=== Singles ===
- (Czech Republic) Petra Kvitová defeated (Czech Republic) Lucie Šafářová, 6–7^{(6–8)}, 6–2, 6–2

=== Doubles ===
- (Germany) Julia Görges / (Czech Republic) Lucie Hradecká defeated (Chinese Taipei) Chuang Chia-jung / (China) Liang Chen, 6–3, 6–1
