= 2006 Pilot Pen Tennis – Women's doubles =

Women's doubles
- 2006 Pilot Pen Tennis

Final
- Champions: (China) Yan Zi (China) Zheng Jie
- Runners-up: (United States) Lisa Raymond (Australia) Samantha Stosur
- Score: 6–4, 6–2

Events
Singles	men	women
Doubles	men	women
← 2005 ·	Pilot Pen Tennis	· 2007 →

Lisa Raymond and Samantha Stosur were the defending champions, but were eliminated in the final.

Yan Zi and Zheng Jie won the title, defeating Lisa Raymond and Samantha Stosur 6–4, 6–2 in the final. It was the 6th doubles title of the year and the 8th doubles title in their careers for both players.

== Seeds ==
1. (United States) Lisa Raymond / (Australia) Samantha Stosur (final)
2. (China) Yan Zi / (China) Zheng Jie (champions)
3. (Zimbabwe) Cara Black / (Australia) Rennae Stubbs (semifinals)
4. (Czech Republic) Květa Peschke / (Italy) Francesca Schiavone (first round)

== Draw ==
=== Key ===
- Q = Qualifier
- WC = Wild card
- LL = Lucky loser
- Alt = Alternate
- SE = Special exempt
- PR = Protected ranking
- ITF = ITF entry
- JE = Junior exempt
- w/o = Walkover
- r = Retired
- d = Defaulted
- SR = Special ranking

First round
1	(United States) L Raymond (Australia) R Stubbs	6	6
WC	(United States) J Craybas (United States) V King	3	1
(Germany) A-L Grönefeld (Czech Republic) V Uhlířová	4	2
(Argentina) G Dulko (Russia) V Dushevina	6	6
3	(Zimbabwe) C Black (Australia) R Stubbs	6	6
LL	(Germany) J Wöhr (Belarus) A Yakimova	1	2
(China) T Sun (United States) M Tu	7	0	2
(Greece) E Daniilidou (Spain) A Medina Garrigues	5	6	6
(Spain) V Ruano Pascual (Argentina) P Suárez	7^{9}	6
WC	(Italy) T Garbin (Australia) A Molik	6^{7}	3
Q	(Russia) A Rodionova (Romania) A Vanc	6	6
4	(Czech Republic) K Peschke (Italy) F Schiavone	3	2
(South Africa) L Huber (Russia) M Kirilenko	6	3	4
(Netherlands) M Krajicek (United States) C Morariu	2	6	6
(Slovakia) J Husárová (Russia) E Likhovtseva	7^{7}	6^{6}	5
2	(China) Z Yan (China) J Zheng	6^{5}	7^{8}	7

Quarterfinals
1	(United States) L Raymond (Australia) R Stubbs	6	6
(Argentina) G Dulko (Russia) V Dushevina	3	2
3	(Zimbabwe) C Black (Australia) R Stubbs	6	6
(Greece) E Daniilidou (Spain) A Medina Garrigues	1	2
(Spain) V Ruano Pascual (Argentina) P Suárez	6	6
Q	(Russia) A Rodionova (Romania) A Vanc	4	3
(Netherlands) M Krajicek (United States) C Morariu	1	4
2	(China) Z Yan (China) J Zheng	6	6

Semifinals
1	(United States) L Raymond (Australia) R Stubbs	6^{2}	6	6
3	(Zimbabwe) C Black (Australia) R Stubbs	7^{7}	4	2
(Spain) V Ruano Pascual (Argentina) P Suárez	3	3
2	(China) Z Yan (China) J Zheng	6	6

Final
1	(United States) L Raymond (Australia) R Stubbs	4	2
2	(China) Z Yan (China) J Zheng	6	6
