= 2004 Pilot Pen Tennis – Singles =

Singles
- 2004 Pilot Pen Tennis

Final
- Champion: (Russia) Elena Bovina
- Runner-up: (France) Nathalie Dechy
- Score: 6–2, 2–6, 7–5

Details
- Draw: 28
- Seeds: 8

Events
Singles	Doubles
← 2003 ·	Pilot Pen Tennis	· 2005 →

Jennifer Capriati was the defending champion, but lost in quarterfinals to Nathalie Dechy.

Elena Bovina won the title by defeating Nathalie Dechy 6–2, 2–6, 7–5 in the final. It was the 1st title in the season for Bovina and the 3rd title in her career.

== Seeds ==
The first four seeds received a bye into the second round.

1. (United States) ~~Lindsay Davenport~~ (withdrew due to a left wrist tendonitis)
2. (Russia) Elena Dementieva (semifinals)
3. (United States) Jennifer Capriati (quarterfinals)
4. (Russia) Maria Sharapova (second round)
5. (Russia) Nadia Petrova (second round)
6. (Bulgaria) Magdalena Maleeva (first round)
7. (Russia) Elena Bovina (champion)
8. (France) Nathalie Dechy (final)

== Draw ==
=== Key ===
- Q = Qualifier
- WC = Wild card
- LL = Lucky loser
- Alt = Alternate
- SE = Special exempt
- PR = Protected ranking
- ITF = ITF entry
- JE = Junior exempt
- w/o = Walkover
- r = Retired
- d = Defaulted
- SR = Special ranking

=== Finals ===
Semifinals
WC	(United States) Lisa Raymond	4	0
8	(France) Nathalie Dechy	6	6
7	(Russia) Elena Bovina	6	6
2	(Russia) Elena Dementieva	1	1

Final
8	(France) Nathalie Dechy	2	6	5
7	(Russia) Elena Bovina	6	2	7

=== Top half ===
First round
Q	(United States) L Lee-Waters	6^{2}	5
(Slovakia) D Hantuchová	7^{7}	7
(Russia) D Safina	1	6	2
WC	(United States) L Raymond	6	3	6
Q	(Zimbabwe) C Black	1	4
5	(Russia) N Petrova	6	6
WC	(United States) S Perry	1	6^{5}
(France) T Golovin	6	7^{7}
Q	(Croatia) S Talaja	4	6	5
(Japan) A Morigami	6	4	7
(Spain) M Serna	1	4
8	(France) N Dechy	6	6

Second round
LL	(United States) M Irvin	5	6	3
(Slovakia) D Hantuchová	7	4	6
WC	(United States) L Raymond	3	6	6
5	(Russia) N Petrova	6	4	4
3	(United States) J Capriati	6	6
(France) T Golovin	3	2
(Japan) A Morigami	0	6	2
8	(France) N Dechy	6	3	6

Quarterfinals
(Slovakia) D Hantuchová	4	3
WC	(United States) L Raymond	6	6
3	(United States) J Capriati	4	5
8	(France) N Dechy	6	7

Semifinals
WC	(United States) L Raymond	4	0
8	(France) N Dechy	6	6

=== Bottom half ===
First round
7	(Russia) E Bovina	6	7
(Czech Republic) D Chládková	0	5
Q	(Austria) S Bammer	4	6	1
Q	(Spain) M Marrero	6	1	6
(United States) M Shaughnessy	4	4
WC	(United States) M Washington	6	6
6	(Bulgaria) M Maleeva	6	4	4
(Croatia) J Kostanić	3	6	6
Q	(Slovakia) H Nagyová	4	2
(Serbia and Montenegro) J Janković	6	6
(Luxembourg) C Schaul	6	6
(Thailand) T Tanasugarn	4	3

Second round
7	(Russia) E Bovina	6	6
Q	(Spain) M Marrero	3	2
WC	(United States) M Washington	6	2	6
4	(Russia) M Sharapova	3	6	2
(Croatia) J Kostanić	2	5
(Serbia and Montenegro) J Janković	6	7
(Luxembourg) C Schaul	2	2
2	(Russia) E Dementieva	6	6

Quarterfinals
7	(Russia) E Bovina	6	6
WC	(United States) M Washington	3	2
(Serbia and Montenegro) J Janković	1	4
2	(Russia) E Dementieva	6	6

Semifinals
7	(Russia) E Bovina	6	6
2	(Russia) E Dementieva	1	1
