= 2006 Pilot Pen Tennis =

- Date: August 20–26
- Edition: 22nd
- Category: International Series (ATP); Tier II (WTA)
- Surface: Hard / outdoor
- Location: New Haven, Connecticut, U.S.
- Venue: Cullman-Heyman Tennis Center

Champions

Men's singles
- (Russia) Nikolay Davydenko

Women's singles
- (Belgium) Justine Henin

Men's doubles
- (Israel) Jonathan Erlich / (Israel) Andy Ram

Women's doubles
- (China) Yan Zi / (China) Zheng Jie
← 2005 ·	Pilot Pen Tennis	· 2007 →

The 2006 Pilot Pen Tennis is a tennis tournament played on outdoor hard courts. It was the 22nd edition of the Pilot Pen Tennis, and is part of the International Series of the 2006 ATP Tour, and of the Tier II Series of the 2006 WTA Tour. It took place at the Cullman-Heyman Tennis Center in New Haven, United States, from August 20 through August 26, 2006.

== Finals ==
=== Men's singles ===
(Russia) Nikolay Davydenko def. (Argentina) Agustín Calleri 6–4, 6–3.

=== Women's singles ===
(Belgium) Justine Henin def. (United States) Lindsay Davenport 6–0, 1–0 ret.

=== Men's doubles ===
(Israel) Jonathan Erlich / (Israel) Andy Ram def. (Poland) Mariusz Fyrstenberg / (Poland) Marcin Matkowski 6–3, 6–3.

=== Women's doubles ===
(China) Yan Zi / (China) Zheng Jie def. (United States) Lisa Raymond / (Australia) Samantha Stosur 6–4, 6–2.
