= 2003 Pilot Pen Tennis – Singles =

Singles
- 2003 Pilot Pen Tennis

Final
- Champion: (United States) Jennifer Capriati
- Runner-up: (United States) Lindsay Davenport
- Score: 6–2, 4–0, ret.

Details
- Draw: 28 (3WC/6Q/1LL)
- Seeds: 8

Events
Singles	Doubles
← 2002 ·	Pilot Pen Tennis	· 2004 →

Venus Williams was the defending champion, but she chose not to compete this year.

Jennifer Capriati won the title after Lindsay Davenport retired from the final with the scoreline at 6–2, 4–0.

== Seeds ==
The first four seeds received a bye into the second round.

1. (United States) Lindsay Davenport (final)
2. (France) Amélie Mauresmo (semifinals)
3. (United States) Jennifer Capriati (champion)
4. (Slovakia) Daniela Hantuchová (second round)
5. (Russia) Anastasia Myskina (first round)
6. (Bulgaria) Magdalena Maleeva (second round)
7. (Spain) Conchita Martínez (second round)
8. (Japan) Ai Sugiyama (quarterfinals)

== Draw ==
=== Key ===
- Q = Qualifier
- WC = Wild card
- LL = Lucky loser
- Alt = Alternate
- SE = Special exempt
- PR = Protected ranking
- ITF = ITF entry
- JE = Junior exempt
- w/o = Walkover
- r = Retired
- d = Defaulted
- SR = Special ranking

=== Finals ===
Semifinals
1	(United States) Lindsay Davenport	6	6
(Russia) Elena Dementieva	4	2
3	(United States) Jennifer Capriati	6	3
2	(France) Amélie Mauresmo	3	1^{r}

Final
1	(United States) Lindsay Davenport	2	0^{r}
3	(United States) Jennifer Capriati	6	4

=== Top half ===
First round
(United States) M Shaughnessy	2	4
WC	(Federal Republic of Yugoslavia) J Dokic	6	6
Q	(Slovenia) T Pisnik	6	4	2
(Spain) M Serna	0	6	6
Q	(Thailand) T Tanasugarn	7	4	4
6	(Bulgaria) M Maleeva	5	6	6
Q	(Zimbabwe) C Black	6	6
Q	(Italy) R Grande	2	1
LL	(Italy) S Farina Elia	2	4
(Russia) E Dementieva	6	6
LL	(Japan) S Obata	2	2
7	(Spain) C Martínez	6	6

Second round
1	(United States) L Davenport	6	6
WC	(Federal Republic of Yugoslavia) J Dokic	2	1
(Spain) M Serna	7^{7}	6
6	(Bulgaria) M Maleeva	6^{4}	3
4	(Slovakia) D Hantuchová	3	2
Q	(Zimbabwe) C Black	6	6
(Russia) E Dementieva	4	6	6
7	(Spain) C Martínez	6	2	0

Quarterfinals
1	(United States) L Davenport	6	7
(Spain) M Serna	0	5
Q	(Zimbabwe) C Black	1	1
(Russia) E Dementieva	6	6

Semifinals
1	(United States) L Davenport	6	6
(Russia) E Dementieva	4	2

=== Bottom half ===
First round
5	(Russia) A Myskina	3	7^{7}	4
(Israel) A Pistolesi	6	6^{2}	6
(Russia) V Zvonareva	6	6
WC	(United States) Sarah Taylor	2	0
(Russia) E Bovina	6	7^{7}
Q	(Australia) A Molik	3	6^{4}
8	(Japan) A Sugiyama	3	6	7
(United States) L Raymond	6	2	5
WC	(United States) A Harkleroad	1	6^{3}
LL	(Ukraine) T Perebiynis	6	7^{7}
Q	(Switzerland) M Casanova	6	6
(United States) L Granville	1	1

Second round
(Israel) A Pistolesi	0	7^{7}	6
(Russia) V Zvonareva	6	6^{5}	2
(Russia) E Bovina	6	5	4
3	(United States) J Capriati	4	7	6
8	(Japan) A Sugiyama	6	7^{7}
LL	(Ukraine) T Perebiynis	4	6^{5}
Q	(Switzerland) M Casanova	5	4
2	(France) A Mauresmo	7	6

Quarterfinals
(Israel) A Pistolesi	2	7	1
3	(United States) J Capriati	6	5	6
8	(Japan) A Sugiyama	4	4
2	(France) A Mauresmo	6	6

Semifinals
3	(United States) J Capriati	6	3
2	(France) A Mauresmo	3	1^{r}

== Qualifying ==
=== Seeds ===
1. (Italy) Silvia Farina Elia (qualifying competition, lucky loser)
2. (Thailand) Tamarine Tanasugarn (qualified)
3. (Slovenia) Maja Matevžič (second round)
4. (Czech Republic) Denisa Chládková (second round)
5. (Australia) Alicia Molik (qualified)
6. (France) Marion Bartoli (second round)
7. (France) Émilie Loit (withdrew)
8. (Slovenia) Tina Pisnik (qualified)
9. (Zimbabwe) Cara Black (qualified)
10. (Austria) Barbara Schett (withdrew)
11. (Spain) María Sánchez Lorenzo (second round)
12. (France) Virginie Razzano (second round)

=== Qualifiers ===
1. (Switzerland) Myriam Casanova
2. (Thailand) Tamarine Tanasugarn
3. (Italy) Rita Grande
4. (Slovenia) Tina Pisnik
5. (Australia) Alicia Molik
6. (Zimbabwe) Cara Black

=== Lucky losers ===
1. (Italy) Silvia Farina Elia
2. (Japan) Saori Obata
3. (Ukraine) Tatiana Perebiynis

=== Draw ===
==== First qualifier ====
First round
1	(Italy) Silvia Farina Elia	6	6
WC	(United States) Milangela Morales	1	1
(United States) Samantha Reeves	4	4
(Spain) Arantxa Parra Santonja	6	6
(Switzerland) Myriam Casanova	6	6
WC	(United States) Angela Haynes	2	1
(Germany) Marlene Weingärtner	2	4
12	(France) Virginie Razzano	6	6

Second round
1	(Italy) Silvia Farina Elia	7^{9}	6
(Spain) Arantxa Parra Santonja	6^{7}	2
(Switzerland) Myriam Casanova	6	6
12	(France) Virginie Razzano	2	3

Qualifying competition
1	(Italy) Silvia Farina Elia	0	1
(Switzerland) Myriam Casanova	6	6

==== Second qualifier ====
First round
2	(Thailand) Tamarine Tanasugarn	7	6
Alt	(Indonesia) Wynne Prakusya	5	4
(Switzerland) Emmanuelle Gagliardi	5	6	6
WC	(United States) Corina Morariu	7	3	1
(Germany) Angelika Rösch	1	6	2
(Italy) Maria Elena Camerin	6	2	6
(Croatia) Jelena Kostanić	0	4
11	(Spain) María Sánchez Lorenzo	6	6

Second round
2	(Thailand) Tamarine Tanasugarn	6	6
(Switzerland) Emmanuelle Gagliardi	4	1
(Italy) Maria Elena Camerin	6	7
(Spain) María Sánchez Lorenzo	3	5

Qualifying competition
2	(Thailand) Tamarine Tanasugarn	6	4	7
(Italy) Maria Elena Camerin	4	6	5

==== Third qualifier ====
First round
3	(Slovenia) Maja Matevžič	6	3	6
WC	(United States) Amber Liu	2	6	3
(Italy) Rita Grande	6	6
(Czech Republic) Karolina Šprem	4	2
(Japan) Saori Obata	6	7
Alt	(Germany) Adriana Barna	3	5
(France) Stéphanie Cohen-Aloro	6	6
Alt	(Croatia) Ivana Abramović	3	3

Second round
3	(Slovenia) Maja Matevžič	1	6	0
(Italy) Rita Grande	6	3	6
(Japan) Saori Obata	4	6	6
(France) Stéphanie Cohen-Aloro	6	2	2

Qualifying competition
(Italy) Rita Grande	6	6
(Japan) Saori Obata	3	2

==== Fourth qualifier ====
First round
4	(Czech Republic) Denisa Chládková	6	6
(United States) Jill Craybas	4	2
WC	(United States) Bea Bielik	6	6
(Italy) Antonella Serra Zanetti	1	1
(Italy) Flavia Pennetta	4	1
(Argentina) Clarisa Fernández	6	6
Alt	(South Africa) Natalie Grandin	1	0
8	(Slovenia) Tina Pisnik	6	6

Second round
4	(Czech Republic) Denisa Chládková	4	4
WC	(United States) Bea Bielik	6	6
(Argentina) Clarisa Fernández	6	6^{7}	6^{3}
8	(Slovenia) Tina Pisnik	4	7^{9}	7^{7}

Qualifying competition
WC	(United States) Bea Bielik	3	1
8	(Slovenia) Tina Pisnik	6	6

==== Fifth qualifier ====
First round
5	(Australia) Alicia Molik	6	5	6
(Ukraine) Julia Vakulenko	3	7	4
(Czech Republic) Dája Bedáňová	3	0
(Germany) Anca Barna	6	6
(Luxembourg) Claudine Schaul	6	5	6
(Croatia) Silvija Talaja	3	7	3
(Ukraine) Tatiana Perebiynis	6	6
Alt	(Italy) Nathalie Viérin	0	2

Second round
5	(Australia) Alicia Molik	6	2	6
(Germany) Anca Barna	3	6	2
(Luxembourg) Claudine Schaul	3	6^{5}
(Ukraine) Tatiana Perebiynis	6	7^{7}

Qualifying competition
5	(Australia) Alicia Molik	5	7^{7}	7^{7}
(Ukraine) Tatiana Perebiynis	7	6^{4}	6^{3}

==== Sixth qualifier ====
First round
6	(France) Marion Bartoli	6	6
WC	(United States) Theresa Logar	1	1
(Slovakia) Ľubomíra Kurhajcová	6	5	0
(United States) Marissa Irvin	3	7	6
(Madagascar) Dally Randriantefy	6	6
Alt	(United States) Tara Snyder	3	4
(Belgium) Els Callens	4	4
9	(Zimbabwe) Cara Black	6	6

Second round
6	(France) Marion Bartoli	2	1
(United States) Marissa Irvin	6	6
(Madagascar) Dally Randriantefy	1	6^{4}
9	(Zimbabwe) Cara Black	6	7^{7}

Qualifying competition
(United States) Marissa Irvin	6^{2}	3
9	(Zimbabwe) Cara Black	7^{7}	6
