= 2003 Pilot Pen Tennis – Doubles =

Doubles
- 2003 Pilot Pen Tennis

Final
- Champions: (Spain) Virginia Ruano Pascual (Argentina) Paola Suárez
- Runners-up: (Australia) Alicia Molik (Spain) Magüi Serna
- Score: 7–6^{(8–6)}, 6–3

Details
- Draw: 16 (2WC/1Q)
- Seeds: 4

Events
Singles	Doubles
← 2002 ·	Connecticut Open	· 2004 →

Daniela Hantuchová and Arantxa Sánchez Vicario were the defending champions, but none competed this year. Hantuchová chose to focus at the singles tournament, losing at the second round to Cara Black.

Virginia Ruano Pascual and Paola Suárez won the title by defeating Alicia Molik and Magüi Serna 7–6^{(8–6)}, 6–3 in the final. It was the third title for the pair during this season, after their wins at Charleston and Berlin.

== Seeds ==
1. (Spain) Virginia Ruano Pascual / (Argentina) Paola Suárez (champions)
2. (South Africa) Liezel Huber / (Bulgaria) Magdalena Maleeva (quarterfinals)
3. (France) Nathalie Dechy / (France) Émilie Loit (first round)
4. (Switzerland) Emmanuelle Gagliardi / (United States) Meghann Shaughnessy (first round)

== Draw ==
=== Key ===
- Q = Qualifier
- WC = Wild card
- LL = Lucky loser
- Alt = Alternate
- SE = Special exempt
- PR = Protected ranking
- ITF = ITF entry
- JE = Junior exempt
- w/o = Walkover
- r = Retired
- d = Defaulted
- SR = Special ranking

=== Draw ===
First round
1	(Spain) V Ruano Pascual (Argentina) P Suárez	6	7^{7}
(Slovenia) T Križan (Slovenia) K Srebotnik	2	6^{0}
Q	(Italy) F Pennetta (Germany) A Rösch	3	2
(Ukraine) T Perebiynis (Croatia) S Talaja	6	6
4	(Switzerland) E Gagliardi (United States) M Shaughnessy	6	3	4
(Italy) S Farina Elia (Italy) T Garbin	3	6	6
WC	(United States) L Granville (United States) S Taylor	3	2
(Belgium) E Callens (Indonesia) A Widjaja	6	6
(Zimbabwe) C Black (United States) C Morariu	3	2
(Czech Republic) D Bedáňová (United States) S Reeves	6	6
(France) M Bartoli (Switzerland) M Casanova	6	3	6
3	(France) N Dechy (France) É Loit	4	6	2
(Australia) A Molik (Spain) M Serna	6	7
WC	(Russia) A Myskina (Russia) V Zvonareva	2	5
(Italy) R Grande (Slovenia) M Matevžič	3	2
2	(South Africa) L Huber (Bulgaria) M Maleeva	6	6

Quarterfinals
1	(Spain) V Ruano Pascual (Argentina) P Suárez	6	3	6
(Ukraine) T Perebiynis (Croatia) S Talaja	2	6	2
(Italy) S Farina Elia (Italy) T Garbin	5	3
(Belgium) E Callens (Indonesia) A Widjaja	7	6
(Czech Republic) D Bedáňová (United States) S Reeves	0	3
(France) M Bartoli (Switzerland) M Casanova	6	6
(Australia) A Molik (Spain) M Serna	6	7
2	(South Africa) L Huber (Bulgaria) M Maleeva	3	5

Semifinals
1	(Spain) V Ruano Pascual (Argentina) P Suárez	7	7
(Belgium) E Callens (Indonesia) A Widjaja	5	5
(France) M Bartoli (Switzerland) M Casanova	7	5	4
(Australia) A Molik (Spain) M Serna	5	7	6

Final
1	(Spain) V Ruano Pascual (Argentina) P Suárez	7^{8}	6
(Australia) A Molik (Spain) M Serna	6^{6}	3
