= 2007 Pilot Pen Tennis – Women's singles =

Women's singles
- 2007 Pilot Pen Tennis

Final
- Champion: (Russia) Svetlana Kuznetsova
- Runner-up: (Hungary) Ágnes Szávay
- Score: 6–4, 3–0, ret.

Details
- Draw: 28
- Seeds: 8

Events
Singles	men	women
Doubles	men	women
- Pilot Pen Tennis

The defending champion was Justine Henin-Hardenne, but she chose not to compete.

Svetlana Kuznetsova won the title when Ágnes Szávay retired in the final due to a back injury while trailing 6–4, 3–0.

== Seeds ==
The top four seeds received a bye into the second round.

1. (Russia) Svetlana Kuznetsova (champion)
2. (Slovakia) Daniela Hantuchová (second round)
3. (France) Marion Bartoli (quarterfinals)
4. (Russia) Dinara Safina (quarterfinals)
5. (Switzerland) Patty Schnyder (first round)
6. (Russia) Elena Dementieva (semifinals)
7. (Austria) Sybille Bammer (second round)
8. (Ukraine) Alona Bondarenko (quarterfinals)

== Draw ==
Key

- Q = Qualifier
- WC = Wild card
- LL = Lucky loser
- Alt = Alternate
- ITF = ITF entry
- PR = Protected ranking
- SR = Special ranking
- SE = Special exempt
- JE = Junior exempt
- JR = Junior Accelerator Programme entrant
- CO = College Accelerator Programme entrant
- NG = Next Gen Accelerator Program entrant
- w/o = Walkover
- r = Retired
- d = Defaulted

=== Finals ===
Semifinals
1	(Russia) Svetlana Kuznetsova	4	6	3
6	(Russia) Elena Dementieva	6	3	0^{r}
(Greece) Eleni Daniilidou	6	1	5
Q	(Hungary) Ágnes Szávay	4	6	7

Finals
1	(Russia) Svetlana Kuznetsova	4	3
Q	(Hungary) Ágnes Szávay	6	0^{r}

=== Top half ===
First round
(Poland) A Radwańska	7^{7}	3	6
(Japan) A Sugiyama	6^{5}	6	4
(France) É Loit	6	7
LL	(Slovakia) D Cibulková	0	5
(Italy) F Schiavone	7^{7}	2	6
5	(Switzerland) P Schnyder	6^{5}	6	4
(Russia) O Poutchkova	6^{4}	1
Q	(Spain) V Ruano Pascual	7^{7}	6
Q	(Belarus) T Poutchek	1	0
WC	(United States) A Harkleroad	6	6
(Italy) M Santangelo	2	6	0
6	(Russia) E Dementieva	6	3	6

Second round
1	(Russia) S Kuznetsova	4	6	6
(Poland) A Radwańska	6	1	4
(France) É Loit	1	4
(Italy) F Schiavone	6	6
3	(France) M Bartoli	6	6
Q	(Spain) V Ruano Pascual	0	4
WC	(United States) A Harkleroad	1	6^{6}
6	(Russia) E Dementieva	6	7^{8}

Quarterfinals
1	(Russia) S Kuznetsova	6	0
(Italy) F Schiavone	2	0^{r}
3	(France) M Bartoli	4	2
6	(Russia) E Dementieva	6	6

Semifinals
1	(Russia) S Kuznetsova	4	6	3
6	(Russia) E Dementieva	6	3	0^{r}

=== Bottom half ===
First round
7	(Austria) S Bammer	6	6
(United States) M Shaughnessy	4	2
(Germany) M Müller	4	6^{4}
(Greece) E Daniilidou	6	7^{7}
(Italy) T Garbin	4	4
WC	(United States) V King	6	6
8	(Ukraine) A Bondarenko	6	7^{7}
Q	(Belarus) O Govortsova	3	6^{2}
(India) S Mirza	6	6
(Spain) A Medina Garrigues	3	3
Q	(Hungary) Á Szávay	6	6
(Australia) S Stosur	2	4

Second round
7	(Austria) S Bammer	6	5	2
(Greece) E Daniilidou	1	7	6
WC	(United States) V King	1	3
4	(Russia) D Safina	6	6
8	(Ukraine) A Bondarenko	6	0	6
(India) S Mirza	3	6	3
Q	(Hungary) Á Szávay	7	6
2	(Slovakia) D Hantuchová	5	3

Quarterfinals
(Greece) E Daniilidou	1	7^{10}	6
4	(Russia) D Safina	6	6^{8}	2
8	(Ukraine) A Bondarenko	1	4
Q	(Hungary) Á Szávay	6	6

Semifinals
(Greece) E Daniilidou	6	1	5
Q	(Hungary) Á Szávay	4	6	7
