= 2014 Connecticut Open – Singles =

Women's tennis tournament

Singles
- 2014 Connecticut Open

Final
- Champion: (Czech Republic) Petra Kvitová
- Runner-up: (Slovakia) Magdaléna Rybáriková
- Score: 6–4, 6–2

Details
- Draw: 30
- Seeds: 8

Events
Singles	Doubles
- Connecticut Open

Simona Halep was the defending champion, but lost in the second round to Magdaléna Rybáriková.

Petra Kvitová won the title, defeating Rybáriková in the final, 6–4, 6–2.

== Seeds ==
The top two seeds receive a bye into the second round.

1. (Romania) Simona Halep (second round)
2. (Czech Republic) Petra Kvitová (champion)
3. (Canada) Eugenie Bouchard (second round)
4. (Denmark) Caroline Wozniacki (second round)
5. (Slovakia) Dominika Cibulková (first round)
6. (Italy) Flavia Pennetta (second round)
7. (Italy) Sara Errani (first round)
8. (Spain) Carla Suárez Navarro (withdrew because of a gastrointestinal illness)

== Draw ==
Key

- Q = Qualifier
- WC = Wild card
- LL = Lucky loser
- Alt = Alternate
- ITF = ITF entry
- PR = Protected ranking
- SR = Special ranking
- SE = Special exempt
- JE = Junior exempt
- JR = Junior Accelerator Programme entrant
- CO = College Accelerator Programme entrant
- NG = Next Gen Accelerator Program entrant
- w/o = Walkover
- r = Retired
- d = Defaulted

=== Finals ===
Semifinals
(Slovakia) Magdaléna Rybáriková	6	6
(Italy) Camila Giorgi	2	4
WC	(Australia) Samantha Stosur	3	1
2	(Czech Republic) Petra Kvitová	6	6

Final
(Slovakia) Magdaléna Rybáriková	4	2
2	(Czech Republic) Petra Kvitová	6	6

=== Top half ===
First round
(Slovakia) M Rybáriková	6	6
Q	(Spain) S Soler Espinosa	4	3
(United States) A Riske	6	6
(Australia) C Dellacqua	1	4
(Czech Republic) K Koukalová	1	3
6	(Italy) F Pennetta	6	6
4	(Denmark) C Wozniacki	4	6	6
Q	(Switzerland) T Bacsinszky	6	1	2
(Italy) C Giorgi	6	6
(United States) C Vandeweghe	3	1
Q	(China) S Peng	6	6
(Ukraine) E Svitolina	4	3
(Spain) G Muguruza	6	3	6
7	(Italy) S Errani	2	6	1

Second round
1	(Romania) S Halep	2	6	3
(Slovakia) M Rybáriková	6	4	6
(United States) A Riske	6	7^{7}
6	(Italy) F Pennetta	1	6^{3}
4	(Denmark) C Wozniacki	4	2
(Italy) C Giorgi	6	6
Q	(China) S Peng	2	6	3
(Spain) G Muguruza	6	3	6

Quarterfinals
(Slovakia) M Rybáriková	7	0	6
(United States) A Riske	5	6	4
(Italy) C Giorgi	6	6^{4}	6
(Spain) G Muguruza	4	7^{7}	2

Semifinals
(Slovakia) M Rybáriková	6	6
(Italy) C Giorgi	2	4

=== Bottom half ===
First round
5/WC	(Slovakia) D Cibulková	6^{2}	3
WC	(Germany) A Petkovic	7^{7}	6
WC	(Belgium) K Flipkens	6	4	6
Q	(Japan) M Doi	3	6	2
WC	(Australia) S Stosur	7^{7}	6^{10}	6
(Japan) K Nara	6^{5}	7^{12}	2
(Serbia) B Jovanovski	1	1
3	(Canada) E Bouchard	6	6
LL	(France) C Garcia	7^{7}	7^{7}
Q	(Romania) I-C Begu	6^{4}	6^{4}
(Czech Republic) B Záhlavová-Strýcová	6	5	6
Q	(Switzerland) B Bencic	4	7	3
(Russia) E Makarova	6	6
(Italy) R Vinci	3	3

Second round
WC	(Germany) A Petkovic	6	6^{4}	6^{6}
WC	(Belgium) K Flipkens	4	7^{7}	7^{8}
WC	(Australia) S Stosur	6	6
3	(Canada) E Bouchard	2	2
LL	(France) C Garcia	5	2
(Czech Republic) B Záhlavová-Strýcová	7	6
(Russia) E Makarova	2	1
2	(Czech Republic) P Kvitová	6	6

Quarterfinals
WC	(Belgium) K Flipkens	3	6	3
WC	(Australia) S Stosur	6	4	6
(Czech Republic) B Záhlavová-Strýcová	4	1
2	(Czech Republic) P Kvitová	6	6

Semifinals
WC	(Australia) S Stosur	3	1
2	(Czech Republic) P Kvitová	6	6

== Qualifying ==
=== Seeds ===
1. (China) Peng Shuai (qualified)
2. (Czech Republic) Karolína Plíšková (first round)
3. (France) Caroline Garcia (qualifying competition, lucky loser)
4. (Germany) Mona Barthel (qualifying competition)
5. (United States) Lauren Davis (first round)
6. (United States) Varvara Lepchenko (first round)
7. (Estonia) Kaia Kanepi (qualifying competition)
8. (Kazakhstan) Zarina Diyas (first round)
9. (Bulgaria) Tsvetana Pironkova (first round)
10. (China) Zheng Jie (first round)
11. (Switzerland) Belinda Bencic (qualified)
12. (Spain) María Teresa Torró Flor (first round)

=== Qualifiers ===
1. (China) Peng Shuai
2. (Japan) Misaki Doi
3. (Romania) Irina-Camelia Begu
4. (Switzerland) Belinda Bencic
5. (Switzerland) Timea Bacsinszky
6. (Spain) Sílvia Soler Espinosa

=== Lucky losers ===
1. (France) Caroline Garcia

=== Draw ===
==== First qualifier ====
First round
1	(China) Peng Shuai	6	6
(Slovakia) Anna Schmiedlová	2	2
(United Kingdom) Johanna Konta	6	6
(Argentina) Paula Ormaechea	1	4
(Italy) Karin Knapp	6	6
(Poland) Katarzyna Piter	2	0
(Slovenia) Polona Hercog	7	6
10	(China) Zheng Jie	5	4

Second round
1	(China) Peng Shuai	6	6
(United Kingdom) Johanna Konta	2	1
(Italy) Karin Knapp	6	6
(Slovenia) Polona Hercog	2	1

Qualifying competition
1	(China) Peng Shuai	6	6
(Italy) Karin Knapp	3	3

==== Second qualifier ====
First round
2	(Czech Republic) Karolína Plíšková	1	1
(Romania) Monica Niculescu	6	6
(Germany) Annika Beck	6	6
(United States) Julia Cohen	1	1
(United States) Nicole Gibbs	6	6
(Switzerland) Stefanie Vögele	4	2
(Japan) Misaki Doi	6	6
12	(Spain) María Teresa Torró Flor	1	1

Second round
(Romania) Monica Niculescu	3	4
(Germany) Annika Beck	6	6
(United States) Nicole Gibbs	7	6^{4}	4
(Japan) Misaki Doi	5	7^{7}	6

Qualifying competition
(Germany) Annika Beck	6^{4}	6	6^{3}
(Japan) Misaki Doi	7^{7}	2	7^{7}

==== Third qualifier ====
First round
3/WC	(France) Caroline Garcia	6	6
(New Zealand) Marina Erakovic	4	4
(Chinese Taipei) Hsieh Su-wei	6	6
WC	(United States) Danielle Collins	4	3
WC	(United States) Caitlin Whoriskey	5	7^{7}	1
(France) Pauline Parmentier	7	6^{5}	6
(Romania) Irina-Camelia Begu	7^{8}	6
8	(Kazakhstan) Zarina Diyas	6^{6}	1

Second round
3/WC	(France) Caroline Garcia	6	7
(Chinese Taipei) Hsieh Su-wei	3	5
(France) Pauline Parmentier	2	6^{2}
(Romania) Irina-Camelia Begu	6	7^{7}

Qualifying competition
3/WC	(France) Caroline Garcia	4	7	6^{5}
(Romania) Irina-Camelia Begu	6	5	7^{7}

==== Fourth qualifier ====
First round
4	(Germany) Mona Barthel	7^{7}	3	7
(Netherlands) Kiki Bertens	6^{4}	6	5
(Slovakia) Jana Čepelová	7^{9}	7
(Germany) Anna-Lena Friedsam	6^{7}	5
WC	(Belgium) An-Sophie Mestach	3	6	7
(Israel) Julia Glushko	6	4	5
(Croatia) Donna Vekić	6^{2}	2
11	(Switzerland) Belinda Bencic	7^{7}	6

Second round
4	(Germany) Mona Barthel	3
(Slovakia) Jana Čepelová	1^{r}
WC	(Belgium) An-Sophie Mestach	4	3
11	(Switzerland) Belinda Bencic	6	6

Qualifying competition
4	(Germany) Mona Barthel	3	6^{6}
11	(Switzerland) Belinda Bencic	6	7^{8}

==== Fifth qualifier ====
First round
5	(United States) Lauren Davis	7^{7}	5	0
(Switzerland) Timea Bacsinszky	6^{3}	7	6
(Czech Republic) Kristýna Plíšková	7	5	4
(Belgium) Yanina Wickmayer	5	7	6
(Belarus) Olga Govortsova	6	6
(United States) Grace Min	3	3
(Italy) Francesca Schiavone	7^{7}	6
9	(Bulgaria) Tsvetana Pironkova	6^{3}	4

Second round
(Switzerland) Timea Bacsinszky	6	6
(Belgium) Yanina Wickmayer	1	4
(Belarus) Olga Govortsova	2	3
(Italy) Francesca Schiavone	6	6

Qualifying competition
(Switzerland) Timea Bacsinszky	6	7
(Italy) Francesca Schiavone	2	5

==== Sixth qualifier ====
First round
6	(United States) Varvara Lepchenko	2	6	6^{5}
(Canada) Aleksandra Wozniak	6	3	7^{7}
(Spain) Sílvia Soler Espinosa	6	6
(France) Claire Feuerstein	2	1
(Belgium) Alison Van Uytvanck	3	2
WC	(Romania) Sorana Cîrstea	6	6
(Israel) Shahar Pe'er	1	5
7	(Estonia) Kaia Kanepi	6	7

Second round
(Canada) Aleksandra Wozniak	2	6^{1}
(Spain) Sílvia Soler Espinosa	6	7^{7}
WC	(Romania) Sorana Cîrstea	1	7^{7}	4
7	(Estonia) Kaia Kanepi	6	6^{1}	6

Qualifying competition
(Spain) Sílvia Soler Espinosa	6	6
7	(Estonia) Kaia Kanepi	4	2
