= 2006 Pilot Pen Tennis – Women's singles =

Women's singles
- 2006 Pilot Pen Tennis

Final
- Champion: (Belgium) Justine Henin-Hardenne
- Runner-up: (United States) Lindsay Davenport
- Score: 6–0, 1–0 retired

Details
- Draw: 28
- Seeds: 8

Events
Singles	men	women
Doubles	men	women
- Pilot Pen Tennis

Lindsay Davenport was the defending champion, but was forced to retire in the final due to a right shoulder strain.

Justine Henin-Hardenne won the title, leading in the final 6–0, 1–0 until Davenport retired. It was the fifth title of the year for Henin-Hardenne and the 28th of her career.

== Seeds ==
The first four seeds received a bye into the second round.

1. (France) Amélie Mauresmo (quarterfinals)
2. (Belgium) Justine Henin-Hardenne (champion)
3. (Russia) Elena Dementieva (quarterfinals)
4. (Russia) Nadia Petrova (second round)
5. (Russia) Svetlana Kuznetsova (semifinals)
6. (Switzerland) Patty Schnyder (first round)
7. (United States) Lindsay Davenport (final, retired due to a right shoulder strain)
8. (Russia) Anastasia Myskina (first round)

== Draw ==
Key

- Q = Qualifier
- WC = Wild card
- LL = Lucky loser
- Alt = Alternate
- ITF = ITF entry
- PR = Protected ranking
- SR = Special ranking
- SE = Special exempt
- JE = Junior exempt
- JR = Junior Accelerator Programme entrant
- CO = College Accelerator Programme entrant
- NG = Next Gen Accelerator Program entrant
- w/o = Walkover
- r = Retired
- d = Defaulted

=== Finals ===
Semifinals
7	(United States) Lindsay Davenport	7^{7}	7^{9}
LL	(Australia) Samantha Stosur	6^{3}	6^{7}
5	(Russia) Svetlana Kuznetsova	3	3
WC/2	(Belgium) Justine Henin-Hardenne	6	6

Final
7	(United States) Lindsay Davenport	0	0^{r}
WC/2	(Belgium) Justine Henin-Hardenne	6	1

=== Top half ===
First round
(Russia) A Chakvetadze	3	5^{r}
Q	(Russia) G Voskoboeva	6	6
(Italy) F Schiavone	6	6
(Russia) E Likhovtseva	3	4
(Slovenia) K Srebotnik	3	3
7	(United States) L Davenport	6	6
(France) M Bartoli	6	6
(Argentina) G Dulko	3	2
(France) N Dechy	6	2^{r}
LL	(Australia) S Stosur	4	5
Q	(China) T Sun	6	6
WC/6	(Switzerland) P Schnyder	1	3

Second round
1	(France) A Mauresmo	4	6	6
Q	(Russia) G Voskoboeva	6	1	2
(Italy) F Schiavone	4	2
7	(United States) L Davenport	6	6
WC/4	(Russia) N Petrova	6	4	6^{4}
(France) M Bartoli	4	6	7^{7}
LL	(Australia) S Stosur	4	6	6
Q	(China) T Sun	6	1	2

Quarterfinals
1	(France) A Mauresmo	4	5
7	(United States) L Davenport	6	7
(France) M Bartoli	6^{2}	0
LL	(Australia) S Stosur	7^{7}	6

Semifinals
7	(United States) L Davenport	7^{7}	7^{9}
LL	(Australia) S Stosur	6^{3}	6^{7}

=== Bottom half ===
First round
5	(Russia) S Kuznetsova	6^{6}	6	6
Q	(United States) J Craybas	7^{8}	1	1
(France) T Golovin	4	7^{7}	6
(Australia) A Molik	6	6^{3}	3
(Slovakia) D Hantuchová	6	6^{5}	6
(Germany) A-L Grönefeld	3	7^{7}	4
8	(Russia) A Myskina	6	3	4
LL	(Italy) M Santangelo	4	6	6
(Russia) M Kirilenko	1	2
(China) N Li	6	6
(Spain) A Medina Garrigues	6	6
Q	(Greece) E Daniilidou	4	1

Second round
5	(Russia) S Kuznetsova	6	2	6
(France) T Golovin	0	6	4
(Slovakia) D Hantuchová	2	7	0
3	(Russia) E Dementieva	6	5	6
LL	(Italy) M Santangelo	w/o
(China) N Li
(Spain) A Medina Garrigues	4	2
WC/2	(Belgium) J Henin-Hardenne	6	6

Quarterfinals
5	(Russia) S Kuznetsova	6	3	6
3	(Russia) E Dementieva	3	6	2
LL	(Italy) M Santangelo	2	3
WC/2	(Belgium) J Henin-Hardenne	6	6

Semifinals
5	(Russia) S Kuznetsova	3	3
WC/2	(Belgium) J Henin-Hardenne	6	6
