= 2014 Connecticut Open – Doubles =

Doubles
- 2014 Connecticut Open

Final
- Champion: (Slovenia) Andreja Klepač (Spain) Sílvia Soler Espinosa
- Runner-up: (New Zealand) Marina Erakovic (Spain) Arantxa Parra Santonja
- Score: 7–5, 4–6, [10–7]

Events
Singles	Doubles
← 2013 ·	Connecticut Open	· 2015 →

Sania Mirza and Zheng Jie were the defending champions, but they decided not to compete together. Mirza partnered up with Cara Black, but lost in the quarterfinals to Caroline Garcia and Monica Niculescu. Zheng played alongside Chan Hao-ching, but lost in the first round to Darija Jurak and Megan Moulton-Levy.
This is about a Tennis match in 2014. Andreja Klepač and Sílvia Soler Espinosa won the title, defeating Marina Erakovic and Arantxa Parra Santonja in the final, 7–5, 4–6, [10–7].

== Seeds ==
1. (Zimbabwe) Cara Black / (India) Sania Mirza (quarterfinals)
2. (Czech Republic) Květa Peschke / (Slovenia) Katarina Srebotnik (first round)
3. (Hungary) Tímea Babos / (France) Kristina Mladenovic (withdrew because of Mladenovic's lumbar spine injury)
4. (Chinese Taipei) Chan Hao-ching / (China) Zheng Jie (first round)
5. (Spain) Anabel Medina Garrigues / (Kazakhstan) Yaroslava Shvedova (quarterfinals)

== Draw ==
=== Key ===
- Q = Qualifier
- WC = Wild card
- LL = Lucky loser
- Alt = Alternate
- SE = Special exempt
- PR = Protected ranking
- ITF = ITF entry
- JE = Junior exempt
- w/o = Walkover
- r = Retired
- d = Defaulted
- SR = Special ranking

=== Draw ===
First round
1	(Zimbabwe) C Black (India) S Mirza	6^{3}	7^{7}	[10]
(Czech Republic) Ka Plíšková (Czech Republic) Kr Plíšková	7^{7}	6^{2}	[7]
(France) C Garcia (Romania) M Niculescu	6	5	[14]
(Germany) A-L Grönefeld (Czech Republic) K Koukalová	0	7	[12]
5	(Spain) A Medina Garrigues (Kazakhstan) Y Shvedova	6	6
(Israel) S Pe'er (Poland) K Piter	4	1
(Spain) G Muguruza (Spain) C Suárez Navarro	6	5	[6]
(New Zealand) M Erakovic (Spain) A Parra Santonja	2	7	[10]
Alt	(United States) A Riske (United States) C Vandeweghe	7	6
WC	(United States) N Gibbs (United States) G Min	5	2
(Croatia) D Jurak (United States) M Moulton-Levy	6	7
4	(Chinese Taipei) H-c Chan (China) J Zheng	1	5
(Georgia (country)) O Kalashnikova (Poland) A Rosolska	6^{3}	1
(Australia) C Dellacqua (Switzerland) S Vögele	7^{7}	6
(Slovenia) A Klepač (Spain) S Soler Espinosa	7^{7}	6
2	(Czech Republic) K Peschke (Slovenia) K Srebotnik	6^{2}	4

Quarterfinals
1	(Zimbabwe) C Black (India) S Mirza	6^{2}	4
(France) C Garcia (Romania) M Niculescu	7^{7}	6
5	(Spain) A Medina Garrigues (Kazakhstan) Y Shvedova	6	5	[7]
(New Zealand) M Erakovic (Spain) A Parra Santonja	1	7	[10]
Alt	(United States) A Riske (United States) C Vandeweghe	6^{4}	6	[8]
(Croatia) D Jurak (United States) M Moulton-Levy	7^{7}	1	[10]
(Australia) C Dellacqua (Switzerland) S Vögele	3	6	[6]
(Slovenia) A Klepač (Spain) S Soler Espinosa	6	2	[10]

Semifinals
(France) C Garcia (Romania) M Niculescu	2	7	[9]
(New Zealand) M Erakovic (Spain) A Parra Santonja	6	5	[11]
(Croatia) D Jurak (United States) M Moulton-Levy	6^{3}	6	[8]
(Slovenia) A Klepač (Spain) S Soler Espinosa	7^{7}	4	[10]

Final
(New Zealand) M Erakovic (Spain) A Parra Santonja	5	6	[7]
(Slovenia) A Klepač (Spain) S Soler Espinosa	7	4	[10]
