= 2007 Pilot Pen Tennis – Men's doubles =

Men's doubles
- 2007 Pilot Pen Tennis

Final
- Champions: (India) Mahesh Bhupathi (Serbia) N Zimonjić
- Runners-up: (Poland) Mariusz Fyrstenberg (Poland) Marcin Matkowski
- Score: 6–3, 6–3

Events
Singles	men	women
Doubles	men	women
← 2006 ·	Pilot Pen Tennis	· 2008 →

Jonathan Erlich and Andy Ram were the defending champions but were eliminated in the first round by Alex Kuznetsov and Ryan Sweeting.

Mahesh Bhupathi and Nenad Zimonjić defeated Mariusz Fyrstenberg and Marcin Matkowski 6–3, 6–3 in the final.

== Draw ==
First round
1	(India) M Bhupathi (Serbia) N Zimonjić	7	6
(Spain) N Almagro (Spain) F Verdasco	5	3
(Argentina) A Calleri (Argentina) J Mónaco	6^{3}	6^{0}
(Spain) D Ferrer (Spain) A Montañés	7^{7}	7^{7}
3	(Sweden) S Aspelin (Austria) J Knowle	5	4
(Czech Republic) F Čermák (Czech Republic) L Friedl	7	6
(United States) E Butorac (Australia) A Fisher	6	6
(Italy) P Starace (Italy) F Volandri	3	2
(Slovakia) D Hrbatý (Germany) M Kohlmann	6^{2}	1
(Czech Republic) J Levinský (Australia) T Perry	7^{7}	6
(Switzerland) Y Allegro (France) A Clément	3	6^{5}
4	(Poland) M Fyrstenberg (Poland) M Matkowski	6	7^{7}
WC	(United States) S Lipsky (United States) D Martin	4	5
(Australia) J Kerr (United Kingdom) J Murray	6	7
WC	(United States) A Kuznetsov (United States) R Sweeting	7^{7}	6
2	(Israel) J Erlich (Israel) A Ram	6^{1}	2

Quarterfinals
1	(India) M Bhupathi (Serbia) N Zimonjić	7^{7}	7^{7}
(Spain) D Ferrer (Spain) A Montañés	6^{3}	6^{3}
(Czech Republic) F Čermák (Czech Republic) L Friedl	2	4
(United States) E Butorac (Australia) A Fisher	6	6
(Czech Republic) J Levinský (Australia) T Perry	2	2
4	(Poland) M Fyrstenberg (Poland) M Matkowski	6	6
(Australia) J Kerr (United Kingdom) J Murray	3	6	[10]
WC	(United States) A Kuznetsov (United States) R Sweeting	6	3	[5]

Semifinals
1	(India) M Bhupathi (Serbia) N Zimonjić	7	7^{7}
(United States) E Butorac (Australia) A Fisher	5	6^{2}
4	(Poland) M Fyrstenberg (Poland) M Matkowski	6	6
(Australia) J Kerr (United Kingdom) J Murray	2	3

Finals
1	(India) M Bhupathi (Serbia) N Zimonjić	6	6
4	(Poland) M Fyrstenberg (Poland) M Matkowski	3	3
