= 2006 Pilot Pen Tennis – Men's doubles =

Men's doubles
- 2006 Pilot Pen Tennis

Final
- Champions: (Israel) Jonathan Erlich (Israel) Andy Ram
- Runners-up: (Poland) Mariusz Fyrstenberg (Poland) Marcin Matkowski
- Score: 6–3, 6–3

Events
Singles	men	women
Doubles	men	women
← 2005 ·	Pilot Pen Tennis	· 2007 →

Gastón Etlis and Martín Rodríguez were the defending champions, but did not compete this year.

Jonathan Erlich and Andy Ram won the title, defeating Mariusz Fyrstenberg and Marcin Matkowski 6–3, 6–3 in the final. It was the 9th doubles title for both players in their careers.

== Seeds ==
1. (Australia) Paul Hanley / (Zimbabwe) Kevin Ullyett (first round)
2. (Israel) Jonathan Erlich / (Israel) Andy Ram (champions)
3. (Poland) Mariusz Fyrstenberg / (Poland) Marcin Matkowski (final)
4. (Austria) Julian Knowle / (Austria) Jürgen Melzer (semifinals)

== Draw ==
=== Key ===
- Q = Qualifier
- WC = Wild card
- LL = Lucky loser
- Alt = Alternate
- SE = Special exempt
- PR = Protected ranking
- ITF = ITF entry
- JE = Junior exempt
- w/o = Walkover
- r = Retired
- d = Defaulted
- SR = Special ranking

=== Draw ===
First round
1	(Australia) P Hanley (Zimbabwe) K Ullyett	1	6	[11]
(Czech Republic) F Čermák (Czech Republic) J Levinský	6	1	[13]
(Czech Republic) P Pála (Czech Republic) P Vízner	6^{3}	6	[6]
(Germany) M Kohlmann (Germany) A Waske	7^{7}	2	[10]
3	(Poland) M Fyrstenberg (Poland) M Matkowski	3	6	[12]
(India) M Bhupathi (United States) J Gimelstob	6	3	[10]
(Argentina) J Acasuso (Argentina) JI Chela	6	6
WC	(United States) T Blake (United States) Roy Kalmanovich	1	4
(Austria) O Marach (Czech Republic) C Suk	7	6^{4}	[8]
(France) N Mahut (Belgium) O Rochus	5	7^{7}	[10]
WC	(United States) A Kuznetsov (United States) P Simmonds	4	6	[8]
4	(Austria) J Knowle (Austria) J Melzer	6	3	[10]
(Czech Republic) L Friedl (Slovakia) M Mertiňák	6	7^{7}
(Czech Republic) D Škoch (Netherlands) R Wassen	2	6^{4}
(Switzerland) Y Allegro (Argentina) A Calleri	2	3
2	(Israel) J Erlich (Israel) A Ram	6	6

Quarterfinals
(Czech Republic) F Čermák (Czech Republic) J Levinský	6	7^{7}
(Germany) M Kohlmann (Germany) A Waske	3	6^{4}
3	(Poland) M Fyrstenberg (Poland) M Matkowski	6	7^{8}
(Argentina) J Acasuso (Argentina) JI Chela	4	6^{6}
(France) N Mahut (Belgium) O Rochus
4	(Austria) J Knowle (Austria) J Melzer	w/o
(Czech Republic) L Friedl (Slovakia) M Mertiňák	6^{5}	6	[7]
2	(Israel) J Erlich (Israel) A Ram	7^{7}	3	[10]

Semifinals
(Czech Republic) F Čermák (Czech Republic) J Levinský	2	6^{0}
3	(Poland) M Fyrstenberg (Poland) M Matkowski	6	7^{7}
4	(Austria) J Knowle (Austria) J Melzer	4	3
2	(Israel) J Erlich (Israel) A Ram	6	6

Final
3	(Poland) M Fyrstenberg (Poland) M Matkowski	3	3
2	(Israel) J Erlich (Israel) A Ram	6	6
