= 2007 Pilot Pen Tennis – Men's singles =

Men's singles
- 2007 Pilot Pen Tennis

Final
- Champion: (United States) James Blake
- Runner-up: (United States) Mardy Fish
- Score: 7–5, 6–4

Events
Singles	men	women
Doubles	men	women
← 2006 ·	Pilot Pen Tennis	· 2008 →

Nikolay Davydenko was the defending champion, but lost to Gilles Simon in the third round.

James Blake won the title, defeating Mardy Fish 7–5, 6–4 in the final.

== Draw ==
=== Finals ===
Quarterfinals
13	(France) Gilles Simon	4	3
5	(France) Paul-Henri Mathieu	6	6
3	(United States) James Blake	6	6
12	(Spain) Fernando Verdasco	4	2
11	(Croatia) Ivo Karlović	6^{8}	6	7^{7}
14	(Russia) Igor Andreev	7^{10}	4	6^{1}
WC	(United States) Mardy Fish	6	6
(Switzerland) Stanislas Wawrinka	3	3

Semifinals
5	(France) Paul-Henri Mathieu	4	6	6^{2}
3	(United States) James Blake	6	3	7^{7}
11	(Croatia) Ivo Karlović	6^{3}	4
WC	(United States) Mardy Fish	7^{7}	6

Finals
3	(United States) James Blake	7	6
WC	(United States) Mardy Fish	5	4

=== Section 1 ===
First round
(United States) A Delić	6	3	4
WC	(United States) D Young	4	6	6
(Argentina) JM del Potro	3	6	6
(France) JF Tsonga	6	3	4
(France) J Benneteau	6	6
(Spain) Ó Hernández	2	2
LL	(Peru) L Horna	6	2	6
(Austria) S Koubek	4	6	4

Second round
1	(Russia) N Davydenko	6	4	7
WC	(United States) D Young	2	6	5
(Argentina) JM del Potro	6^{3}	7^{7}	5
13	(France) G Simon	7^{7}	6^{5}	7
10	(Spain) N Almagro	6^{5}	6	6
(France) J Benneteau	7^{7}	3	3
LL	(Peru) L Horna	3	6^{3}
5	(France) PH Mathieu	6	7^{7}

Third round
1	(Russia) N Davydenko	4	4
13	(France) G Simon	6	6
10	(Spain) N Almagro	6	3	2
5	(France) PH Mathieu	4	6	6

Quarterfinals
13	(France) G Simon	4	3
5	(France) PH Mathieu	6	6

=== Section 2 ===
First round
Q	(South Africa) K Anderson	1	4
(France) A Clément	6	6
(Chile) N Massú	6^{1}	4
(United States) R Ginepri	7^{7}	6
Q	(Russia) E Korolev	2	7	5
(United States) V Spadea	6	5	7
(Serbia) J Tipsarević	6^{5}	6^{2}
(Spain) F López	7^{7}	7^{7}

Second round
3	(United States) J Blake	6	6
(France) A Clément	4	2
(United States) R Ginepri	4	6	5
16	(Argentina) A Calleri	6	3	7
12	(Spain) F Verdasco	2	6	6
(United States) V Spadea	6	4	2
(Spain) F López	6	2	6^{6}
6	(Finland) J Nieminen	3	6	7^{8}

Third round
3	(United States) J Blake	3	7^{7}	6
16	(Argentina) A Calleri	6	6^{2}	1
12	(Spain) F Verdasco	6	2	6
6	(Finland) J Nieminen	3	6	4

Quarterfinals
3	(United States) J Blake	6	6
12	(Spain) F Verdasco	4	2

=== Section 3 ===
First round
(Belgium) K Vliegen	2	1
(Sweden) T Johansson	6	6
(United States) M Russell	3	6	6
(Spain) G García López	6	4	0
(Spain) A Montañés	6	6
Q	(Russia) T Gabashvili	4	4
(Germany) B Becker	3	4
WC	(United States) J Isner	6	6

Second round
8	(Italy) P Starace	6^{3}	3
(Sweden) T Johansson	7^{7}	6
(United States) M Russell	6^{2}	4
11	(Croatia) I Karlović	7^{7}	6
14	(Russia) I Andreev	6	6^{4}	7^{7}
(Spain) A Montañés	1	7^{7}	6^{4}
WC	(United States) J Isner	7^{7}	2	2
4	(Spain) D Ferrer	6^{2}	6	6

Third round
(Sweden) T Johansson	6	4	5
11	(Croatia) I Karlović	4	6	7
14	(Russia) I Andreev	3	7^{7}	6
4	(Spain) D Ferrer	6	6^{3}	4

Quarterfinals
11	(Croatia) I Karlović	6^{8}	6	7^{7}
14	(Russia) I Andreev	7^{10}	4	6^{1}

=== Section 4 ===
First round
WC	(United States) M Fish	4	7	6
(Germany) F Mayer	6	5	4
(Belgium) O Rochus	1	6^{7}
(Argentina) J Acasuso	6	7^{9}
(Switzerland) S Wawrinka	7^{7}	6
Q	(Croatia) M Ančić	6^{4}	4
(France) M Gicquel	6	6
(Argentina) C Berlocq	2	4

Second round
7	(Italy) F Volandri	7^{7}	5	0
WC	(United States) M Fish	6^{4}	7	6
(Argentina) J Acauso	6	7
9	(Slovakia) D Hrbatý	1	5
15	(France) G Monfils	6^{5}	4
(Switzerland) S Wawrinka	7^{7}	6
(France) M Gicquel	4	4
2	(Spain) T Robredo	6	6

Third round
WC	(United States) M Fish	6^{4}	6	6
(Argentina) J Acasuso	7^{7}	3	0
(Switzerland) S Wawrinka	6	6
2	(Spain) T Robredo	3	3

Quarterfinals
WC	(United States) M Fish	6	6
(Switzerland) S Wawrinka	3	3
