= 2005 Pilot Pen Tennis – Women's singles =

Women's singles for 2005 Pilot Pen Tennis

Women's singles
- 2005 Pilot Pen Tennis

Final
- Champion: (United States) Lindsay Davenport
- Runner-up: (France) Amélie Mauresmo
- Score: 6–4, 6–4

Details
- Draw: 28
- Seeds: 8

Events
Singles	men	women
Doubles	men	women
- Pilot Pen Tennis

Elena Bovina was the defending champion,.but did not compete this year due to a right shoulder injury.

Lindsay Davenport won the title, defeating Amélie Mauresmo 6–4, 6–4 in the final.

== Seeds ==
The first four seeds received a bye into the second round.

1. (United States) Lindsay Davenport (champion)
2. (France) Amélie Mauresmo (final)
3. (Russia) ~~Svetlana Kuznetsova~~ (withdrew due to a mid-back strain)
4. (Russia) Elena Dementieva (quarterfinals)
5. (Russia) ~~Nadia Petrova~~ (withdrew due to a right pectoralis strain)
6. (Switzerland) Patty Schnyder (second round)
7. (Australia) Alicia Molik (first round)
8. (Russia) ~~Anastasia Myskina~~ (withdrew due to a left ankle sprain)
9. (France) Nathalie Dechy (first round)
10. (Serbia and Montenegro) Jelena Janković (first round)

== Draw ==
Key

- Q = Qualifier
- WC = Wild card
- LL = Lucky loser
- Alt = Alternate
- ITF = ITF entry
- PR = Protected ranking
- SR = Special ranking
- SE = Special exempt
- JE = Junior exempt
- JR = Junior Accelerator Programme entrant
- CO = College Accelerator Programme entrant
- NG = Next Gen Accelerator Program entrant
- w/o = Walkover
- r = Retired
- d = Defaulted

=== Finals ===
Semifinals
1	(United States) Lindsay Davenport	6	6
(Russia) Anna Chakvetadze	3	3
(Spain) Anabel Medina Garrigues	6	6^{5}	2
2	(France) Amélie Mauresmo	4	7^{7}	6

Final
1	(United States) Lindsay Davenport	6	6
2	(France) Amélie Mauresmo	4	4

=== Top half ===
First round
(France) T Golovin	3	4
Q	(Czech Republic) K Peschke	6	6
(Spain) N Llagostera Vives	4	2
(Slovakia) D Hantuchová	6	6
WC	(United States) L Raymond	3	6	2
6	(Switzerland) P Schnyder	6	1	6
(Bulgaria) M Maleeva	4	6	2
Q	(United States) J Jackson	6	0	6
LL	(Russia) M Kirilenko	6	6
(Italy) S Farina Elia	1	3
(Russia) A Chakvetadze	6	3	6
10	(Serbia and Montenegro) J Janković	3	6	2

Second round
1	(United States) L Davenport	6	6
Q	(Czech Republic) K Peschke	4	1
(Slovakia) D Hantuchová	5	6	6
6	(Switzerland) P Schnyder	7	2	4
LL	(China) J Zheng	6	6
Q	(United States) J Jackson	3	4
LL	(Russia) M Kirilenko	3	3
(Russia) A Chakvetadze	6	6

Quarterfinals
1	(United States) L Davenport	6	7^{7}
(Slovakia) D Hantuchová	2	6^{5}
LL	(China) J Zheng	4	4
(Russia) A Chakvetadze	6	6

Semifinals
1	(United States) L Davenport	6	6
(Russia) A Chakvetadze	3	3

=== Bottom half ===
First round
WC/7	(Australia) A Molik	2	4
(Argentina) G Dulko	6	6
(Spain) A Medina Garrigues	6	6
(France) V Razzano	4	2
(Russia) V Dushevina	6	6
Q	(China) S Peng	4	4
9	(France) N Dechy	6^{3}	6	4
WC	(United States) M Shaughnessy	7^{7}	2	6
Q	(Croatia) J Kostanić	4	1
(Germany) A-L Grönefeld	6	6
(France) M Bartoli	6	6^{7}	3
(Russia) E Likhovtseva	4	7^{9}	6

Second round
(Argentina) G Dulko	0	7^{12}	4
(Spain) A Medina Garrigues	6	6^{10}	6
(Russia) V Dushevina	2	4
4	(Russia) E Dementieva	6	6
WC	(United States) M Shaughnessy	3	5
(Germany) A-L Grönefeld	6	7
(Russia) E Likhovtseva	1	3
2	(France) A Mauresmo	6	6

Quarterfinals
(Spain) A Medina Garrigues	6	6
4	(Russia) E Dementieva	4	3
(Germany) A-L Grönefeld	3	2
2	(France) A Mauresmo	6	6

Semifinals
(Spain) A Medina Garrigues	6	6^{5}	2
2	(France) A Mauresmo	4	7^{7}	6
