= 2014 Connecticut Open =

- Date: August 15–23
- Edition: 46th
- Category: WTA Premier
- Surface: Hard / outdoor
- Location: New Haven, Connecticut, United States
- Venue: Cullman-Heyman Tennis Center

Champions

Singles
- (Czech Republic) Petra Kvitová

Doubles
- (Slovenia) Andreja Klepač / (Spain) Sílvia Soler Espinosa
← 2013 ·	Connecticut Open	· 2015 →

The 2014 Connecticut Open (formerly known as the New Haven Open at Yale) was a women's tennis tournament played on outdoor hard courts. It was the 46th edition of the Connecticut Open, and part of the Premier Series of the 2014 WTA Tour. It took place at the Cullman-Heyman Tennis Center in New Haven, Connecticut, United States, from August 15 through August 23. It was the last event on the 2014 US Open Series before the 2014 US Open.

== Singles main-draw entrants ==
=== Seeds ===
Country	Player	Rank*	Seed
ROU	Simona Halep	2	1
CZE	Petra Kvitová	4	2
CAN	Eugenie Bouchard	8	3
DEN	Caroline Wozniacki	12	4
SVK	Dominika Cibulková	13	5
ITA	Flavia Pennetta	14	6
ITA	Sara Errani	15	7
~~ESP~~	~~Carla Suárez Navarro~~	~~16~~	~~8~~

- Rankings are as of August 11, 2014

=== Other entrants ===
The following players received wildcards into the singles main draw:

- (Slovakia) Dominika Cibulková
- (Belgium) Kirsten Flipkens
- (Germany) Andrea Petkovic
- (Australia) Samantha Stosur

The following players received entry from the qualifying draw:

- (Switzerland) Timea Bacsinszky
- (Romania) Irina-Camelia Begu
- (Switzerland) Belinda Bencic
- (Japan) Misaki Doi
- (China) Peng Shuai
- (Spain) Sílvia Soler Espinosa

The following player received entry as a lucky loser:

- (France) Caroline Garcia

=== Withdrawals ===
Before the tournament

- (Spain) Carla Suárez Navarro --> replaced by Caroline Garcia
- (China) Zhang Shuai --> replaced by Alison Riske

== Doubles main-draw entrants ==
=== Seeds ===
Country	Player	Country	Player	Rank*	Seed
ZIM	Cara Black	IND	Sania Mirza	11	1
CZE	Květa Peschke	SLO	Katarina Srebotnik	17	2
~~HUN~~	~~Tímea Babos~~	~~FRA~~	~~Kristina Mladenovic~~	~~28~~	~~3~~
TPE	Chan Hao-ching	CHN	Zheng Jie	40	4
ESP	Anabel Medina Garrigues	KAZ	Yaroslava Shvedova	51	5

- Rankings are as of August 11, 2014

=== Other entrants ===
The following pair received a wildcard into the doubles main draw:

- (United States) Nicole Gibbs / (United States) Grace Min

The following pair received entry as alternates:

- (United States) Alison Riske / (United States) CoCo Vandeweghe

=== Withdrawals ===
Before the tournament

- (France) Kristina Mladenovic (lumbar spine injury)

== Finals ==
=== Singles ===
(Czech Republic) Petra Kvitová defeated (Slovakia) Magdaléna Rybáriková, 6–4, 6–2

=== Doubles ===
(Slovenia) Andreja Klepač / (Spain) Sílvia Soler Espinosa defeated (New Zealand) Marina Erakovic / (Spain) Arantxa Parra Santonja, 7–5, 4–6, [10–7]
