= 2015 Connecticut Open – Singles =

Singles
- 2015 Connecticut Open

Final
- Champion: (Czech Republic) Petra Kvitová
- Runner-up: (Czech Republic) Lucie Šafářová
- Score: 6–7^{(6–8)}, 6–2, 6–2

Details
- Draw: 30
- Seeds: 8

Events
| Singles | Doubles |
- Connecticut Open

Petra Kvitová was the reigning champion, and successfully defended her title, defeating compatriot and fourth seed Lucie Šafářová in the final 6–7^{(6–8)}, 6–2, 6–2.

== Seeds ==
The top two seeds received a bye into the second round.

1. (Romania) Simona Halep (withdrew)
2. (Czech Republic) Petra Kvitová (champion)
3. (Denmark) Caroline Wozniacki (semifinals)
4. (Czech Republic) Lucie Šafářová (final)
5. (Czech Republic) Karolína Plíšková (quarterfinals)
6. (Switzerland) Timea Bacsinszky (first round)
7. (Poland) Agnieszka Radwańska (quarterfinals)
8. (Italy) Sara Errani (first round)

== Draw ==
Key

- Q = Qualifier
- WC = Wild card
- LL = Lucky loser
- Alt = Alternate
- ITF = ITF entry
- PR = Protected ranking
- SR = Special ranking
- SE = Special exempt
- JE = Junior exempt
- JR = Junior Accelerator Programme entrant
- CO = College Accelerator Programme entrant
- NG = Next Gen Accelerator Program entrant
- w/o = Walkover
- r = Retired
- d = Defaulted

=== Finals ===
Semifinals
LL | (Ukraine) Lesia Tsurenko | 2 | 6^{4}
4/WC | (Czech Republic) Lucie Šafářová | 6 | 7^{7}
3/WC | (Denmark) Caroline Wozniacki | 5 | 1
2 | (Czech Republic) Petra Kvitová | 7 | 6

Final
4/WC | (Czech Republic) Lucie Šafářová | 7^{8} | 2 | 2
2 | (Czech Republic) Petra Kvitová | 6^{6} | 6 | 6

=== Top half ===
First round
(Czech Republic) B Strýcová | 6 | 7
(Italy) C Giorgi | 2 | 5
Q | (Ukraine) O Savchuk | 4 | 6 | 4
Q | (Belarus) O Govortsova | 6 | 3 | 0^{r}
Q | (Slovenia) P Hercog | 6 | 6^{5} | 2
5 | (Czech Republic) Ka Plíšková | 2 | 7^{7} | 6
4/WC | (Czech Republic) L Šafářová | 6 | 6
(Russia) D Gavrilova | 3 | 4
(Kazakhstan) Z Diyas | 5 | 7 | 2
(Romania) I-C Begu | 7 | 5 | 6
PR | (Slovakia) D Cibulková | 7^{8} | 6^{5} | 6
(Bulgaria) T Pironkova | 6^{6} | 7^{7} | 3
(France) K Mladenovic | 6 | 4 | 6
8 | (Italy) S Errani | 2 | 6 | 4

Second round
LL | (Ukraine) L Tsurenko | 6 | 6
(Czech Republic) B Strýcová | 3 | 0
Q | (Ukraine) O Savchuk | 4 | 1
5 | (Czech Republic) Ka Plíšková | 6 | 6
4/WC | (Czech Republic) L Šafářová | 6 | 6
(Romania) I-C Begu | 3 | 4
PR | (Slovakia) D Cibulková | 2 | 7^{7} | 7
(France) K Mladenovic | 6 | 6^{1} | 5

Quarterfinals
LL | (Ukraine) L Tsurenko | 6 | 6
5 | (Czech Republic) Ka Plíšková | 2 | 2
4/WC | (Czech Republic) L Šafářová | 6^{4} | 6 | 7
PR | (Slovakia) D Cibulková | 7^{7} | 4 | 5

Semifinals
LL | (Ukraine) L Tsurenko | 2 | 6^{4}
4/WC | (Czech Republic) L Šafářová | 6 | 7^{7}

=== Bottom half ===
First round
6 | (Switzerland) T Bacsinszky | 3 | 1
(France) C Garcia | 6 | 6
Q | (Slovakia) M Rybáriková | 6^{2} | 6 | 6
(Italy) F Pennetta | 7^{7} | 3 | 1
(Canada) E Bouchard | 1 | 0
Q | (Italy) R Vinci | 6 | 6
WC | (United States) A Riske | 0 | 2
3/WC | (Denmark) C Wozniacki | 6 | 6
7/WC | (Poland) A Radwańska | 6 | 6
(United States) C Vandeweghe | 0 | 2
(France) A Cornet | 2 | 6 | 6
Q | (Kazakhstan) Y Putintseva | 6 | 0 | 2
(United States) M Keys | 7^{7} | 4
(Ukraine) E Svitolina | 6^{4} | 2^{r}

Second round
(France) C Garcia | 7^{7} | 6
Q | (Slovakia) M Rybáriková | 6^{5} | 4
Q | (Italy) R Vinci | 4 | 7^{8} | 6^{7}
3/WC | (Denmark) C Wozniacki | 6 | 6^{6} | 7^{9}
7/WC | (Poland) A Radwańska | 6 | 6
(France) A Cornet | 4 | 2
(United States) M Keys | 6 | 1 | 2
2 | (Czech Republic) P Kvitová | 4 | 6 | 6

Quarterfinals
(France) C Garcia | 3 | 0
3/WC | (Denmark) C Wozniacki | 6 | 6
7/WC | (Poland) A Radwańska | 5 | 4
2 | (Czech Republic) P Kvitová | 7 | 6

Semifinals
3/WC | (Denmark) C Wozniacki | 5 | 1
2 | (Czech Republic) P Kvitová | 7 | 6

== Qualifying ==
=== Seeds ===
1. (Romania) Monica Niculescu (withdrew, left abdominal injury)
2. (Bulgaria) Tsvetana Pironkova (moved to main draw)
3. (Ukraine) Lesia Tsurenko (qualifying competition, lucky loser)
4. (Italy) Roberta Vinci (qualified)
5. (Germany) Carina Witthöft (qualifying competition)
6. (Slovakia) Magdaléna Rybáriková (qualified)
7. (Romania) Alexandra Dulgheru (first round)
8. (Belgium) Alison Van Uytvanck (first round, retired)
9. (Germany) Julia Görges (withdrew, right wrist injury)
10. (Sweden) Johanna Larsson (qualifying competition)
11. (Czech Republic) Lucie Hradecká (first round)
12. (Australia) Casey Dellacqua (withdrew, still playing doubles in Cincinnati)
13. (United States) Christina McHale (qualifying competition)
14. (Germany) Annika Beck (qualifying competition)
15. (Slovenia) Polona Hercog (qualified)
16. (Belarus) Olga Govortsova (qualified)

=== Qualifiers ===
1. (Slovenia) Polona Hercog
2. (Ukraine) Olga Savchuk
3. (Kazakhstan) Yulia Putintseva
4. (Italy) Roberta Vinci
5. (Belarus) Olga Govortsova
6. (Slovakia) Magdaléna Rybáriková

=== Lucky loser ===
1. (Ukraine) Lesia Tsurenko

=== Draw ===
==== First qualifier ====
First round
15 | (Slovenia) Polona Hercog | 6 | 6
(United States) Nicole Gibbs | 3 | 2
(Romania) Andreea Mitu | 6 | 6
Alt | (Slovenia) Andreja Klepač | 3 | 2
(Montenegro) Danka Kovinić | 3 | 4
(United States) Irina Falconi | 6 | 6
WC | (United States) Eva Raszkiewicz | 0 | 0
14 | (Germany) Annika Beck | 6 | 6

Second round
15 | (Slovenia) Polona Hercog | 6 | 6
(Romania) Andreea Mitu | 4 | 4
(United States) Irina Falconi | 3 | 2
14 | (Germany) Annika Beck | 6 | 6

Qualifying competition
15 | (Slovenia) Polona Hercog | 6 | 6
14 | (Germany) Annika Beck | 3 | 1

==== Second qualifier ====
First round
7 | (Romania) Alexandra Dulgheru | 0 | 7^{7} | 4
(Poland) Magda Linette | 6 | 6^{1} | 6
(Russia) Elena Vesnina | 6 | 7
(Japan) Misaki Doi | 1 | 5
WC | (United States) Vania King | 4 | 3
Alt | (Ukraine) Olga Savchuk | 6 | 6
(New Zealand) Marina Erakovic | 6 | 3 | 6
11 | (Czech Republic) Lucie Hradecká | 4 | 6 | 4

Second round
(Poland) Magda Linette | 7 | 6
(Russia) Elena Vesnina | 5 | 2
Alt | (Ukraine) Olga Savchuk | 4 | 6 | 7
(New Zealand) Marina Erakovic | 6 | 3 | 5

Qualifying competition
(Poland) Magda Linette | 6 | 4 | 5
Alt | (Ukraine) Olga Savchuk | 4 | 6 | 7

==== Third qualifier ====
First round
3 | (Ukraine) Lesia Tsurenko | 5
(Italy) Francesca Schiavone | 2^{r}
(Colombia) Mariana Duque Mariño | 4 | 6 | 6
(Bulgaria) Sesil Karatantcheva | 6 | 3 | 2
(Kazakhstan) Yulia Putintseva | 6 | 6
Alt | (Poland) Alicja Rosolska | 0 | 2
(Russia) Elizaveta Kulichkova | 2
8 | (Belgium) Alison Van Uytvanck | 1^{r}

Second round
3 | (Ukraine) Lesia Tsurenko | 6 | 7
(Colombia) Mariana Duque Mariño | 4 | 5
(Kazakhstan) Yulia Putintseva | 6 | 6
(Russia) Elizaveta Kulichkova | 0 | 1

Qualifying competition
3 | (Ukraine) Lesia Tsurenko | 1 | 0
(Kazakhstan) Yulia Putintseva | 6 | 6

==== Fourth qualifier ====
First round
4 | (Italy) Roberta Vinci | 6 | 6
(Spain) Lourdes Domínguez Lino | 4 | 0
(Belgium) An-Sophie Mestach | 6^{3} | 6 | 7
Alt | (United States) Raquel Kops-Jones | 7^{7} | 2 | 5
WC | (United States) Carol Finke | 2 | 0
(United States) Louisa Chirico | 6 | 6
(Croatia) Ana Konjuh | 4 | 4
10 | (Sweden) Johanna Larsson | 6 | 6

Second round
4 | (Italy) Roberta Vinci | 6 | 6
(Belgium) An-Sophie Mestach | 2 | 3
(United States) Louisa Chirico | 2 | 2
10 | (Sweden) Johanna Larsson | 6 | 6

Qualifying competition
4 | (Italy) Roberta Vinci | 7^{7} | 6
10 | (Sweden) Johanna Larsson | 6^{3} | 3

==== Fifth qualifier ====
First round
5 | (Germany) Carina Witthöft | 6 | 1 | 6
(United States) Lauren Davis | 2 | 6 | 0
(United States) Alexa Glatch | 7 | 5 | 6^{3}
(Czech Republic) Andrea Hlaváčková | 5 | 7 | 7^{7}
(Russia) Evgeniya Rodina | 3 | 2
(Puerto Rico) Monica Puig | 6 | 6
(Poland) Urszula Radwańska | 6 | 2 | 4
16 | (Belarus) Olga Govortsova | 4 | 6 | 6

Second round
5 | (Germany) Carina Witthöft | 6 | 6
(Czech Republic) Andrea Hlaváčková | 4 | 2
(Puerto Rico) Monica Puig | 2 | 3
16 | (Belarus) Olga Govortsova | 6 | 6

Qualifying competition
5 | (Germany) Carina Witthöft | 0 | 4
16 | (Belarus) Olga Govortsova | 6 | 6

==== Sixth qualifier ====
First round
6 | (Slovakia) Magdaléna Rybáriková | 6 | 6
(Spain) Lara Arruabarrena | 1 | 1
WC | (United States) Samantha Crawford | 4 | 3
(Estonia) Kaia Kanepi | 6 | 6
WC | (United States) Alexa Graham | 3 | 6 | 3
WC | (United Kingdom) Laura Robson | 6 | 2 | 6
(Russia) Margarita Gasparyan | 5 | 1
13 | (United States) Christina McHale | 7 | 6

Second round
6 | (Slovakia) Magdaléna Rybáriková | 6 | 1 | 6
(Estonia) Kaia Kanepi | 4 | 6 | 2
WC | (United Kingdom) Laura Robson | 6 | 6^{5} | 3
13 | (United States) Christina McHale | 2 | 7^{7} | 6

Qualifying competition
6 | (Slovakia) Magdaléna Rybáriková | 6 | 6
13 | (United States) Christina McHale | 2 | 4
