= 2015 Connecticut Open – Doubles =

Doubles
- 2015 Connecticut Open

Final
- Champions: (Germany) Julia Görges (Czech Republic) Lucie Hradecká
- Runners-up: (Chinese Taipei) Chuang Chia-jung (China) Liang Chen
- Score: 6–3, 6–1

Events
Singles	Doubles
← 2014 ·	Connecticut Open	· 2016 →

Andreja Klepač and Sílvia Soler Espinosa were the defending champions, but Soler Espinosa chose not to participate this year. Klepač played alongside Lara Arruabarrena, but lost in the first round to Chuang Chia-jung and Liang Chen.

Julia Görges and Lucie Hradecká won the title, beating Chuang and Liang in the final, 6-3, 6-1.

== Seeds ==
1. (Slovenia) Katarina Srebotnik / (Russia) Elena Vesnina (first round)
2. (United States) Raquel Kops-Jones / (United States) Abigail Spears (semifinals)
3. (Chinese Taipei) Chan Hao-ching / (Australia) Casey Dellacqua (quarterfinals)
4. (Germany) Julia Görges / (Czech Republic) Lucie Hradecká (champions)

== Draw ==
=== Key ===
- Q = Qualifier
- WC = Wild card
- LL = Lucky loser
- Alt = Alternate
- SE = Special exempt
- PR = Protected ranking
- ITF = ITF entry
- JE = Junior exempt
- w/o = Walkover
- r = Retired
- d = Defaulted
- SR = Special ranking

=== Draw ===
First round
1	(Slovenia) K Srebotnik (Russia) E Vesnina	6	3	[6]
(Czech Republic) E Hrdinová (United States) N Melichar	1	6	[10]
(Spain) L Arruabarrena (Slovenia) A Klepač	3	2
(Chinese Taipei) C-j Chuang (China) C Liang	6	6
3	(Chinese Taipei) H-c Chan (Australia) C Dellacqua	6	7
(United States) V King (Ukraine) O Savchuk	1	5
(Germany) A-L Grönefeld (Sweden) J Larsson	7	7
(Georgia (country)) O Kalashnikova (Poland) A Rosolska	5	5
WC	(United States) L Davis (United States) A Riske	6	6
(United States) I Falconi (United Kingdom) L Robson	2	3
(Poland) K Jans-Ignacik (Romania) R Olaru	2	5
4	(Germany) J Görges (Czech Republic) L Hradecká	6	7
(Spain) A Medina Garrigues (Spain) A Parra Santonja	6	7^{7}
(Chinese Taipei) C-w Chan (Croatia) D Jurak	2	6^{4}
(United Kingdom) J Rae (United Kingdom) A Smith	1	4
2	(United States) R Kops-Jones (United States) A Spears	6	6

Quarterfinals
(Czech Republic) E Hrdinová (United States) N Melichar	6	4	[6]
(Chinese Taipei) C-j Chuang (China) C Liang	1	6	[10]
3	(Chinese Taipei) H-c Chan (Australia) C Dellacqua	6	4	[5]
(Germany) A-L Grönefeld (Sweden) J Larsson	3	6	[10]
WC	(United States) L Davis (United States) A Riske	3	2
4	(Germany) J Görges (Czech Republic) L Hradecká	6	6
(Spain) A Medina Garrigues (Spain) A Parra Santonja	4	6^{2}
2	(United States) R Kops-Jones (United States) A Spears	6	7^{7}

Semifinals
(Chinese Taipei) C-j Chuang (China) C Liang	3	6	[10]
(Germany) A-L Grönefeld (Sweden) J Larsson	6	3	[7]
4	(Germany) J Görges (Czech Republic) L Hradecká	1	6	[10]
2	(United States) R Kops-Jones (United States) A Spears	6	3	[2]

Final
(Chinese Taipei) C-j Chuang (China) C Liang	3	1
4	(Germany) J Görges (Czech Republic) L Hradecká	6	6
