= 2007 Pilot Pen Tennis – Women's doubles =

Tennis tournament

Women's doubles
- 2007 Pilot Pen Tennis

Final
- Champions: (India) S Mirza (Italy) M Santangelo
- Runners-up: (Zimbabwe) C Black (United States) L Huber
- Score: 6–1, 6–2

Events
Singles	men	women
Doubles	men	women
- Pilot Pen Tennis

In the Pilot Pen Tennis competition of 2007, the women's doubles event was won by Sania Mirza and Mara Santangelo.

== Seeds ==
1. (Zimbabwe) Cara Black / (United States) Liezel Huber (final)
2. (Czech Republic) Květa Peschke / (Australia) Rennae Stubbs (semifinals)
3. (India) Sania Mirza / (Italy) Mara Santangelo (champions)
4. (Spain) Anabel Medina Garrigues / (Spain) Virginia Ruano Pascual (first round)

== Draw ==
Key

- Q = Qualifier
- WC = Wild card
- LL = Lucky loser
- Alt = Alternate
- ITF = ITF entry
- PR = Protected ranking
- SR = Special ranking
- SE = Special exempt
- JE = Junior exempt
- JR = Junior Accelerator Programme entrant
- CO = College Accelerator Programme entrant
- NG = Next Gen Accelerator Program entrant
- w/o = Walkover
- r = Retired
- d = Defaulted

First round
1	(Zimbabwe) C Black (United States) L Huber	6^{1}	6	[10]
WC	(United States) L Davenport (United States) L Raymond	7^{7}	3	[4]
(Romania) A Ehritt-Vanc (Russia) A Rodionova	5	4
(Hungary) Á Szávay (Czech Republic) V Uhlířová	7	6
4	(Spain) A Medina Garrigues (Spain) V Ruano Pascual	2	1
(Czech Republic) I Benešová (United States) B Mattek	6	6
(Italy) ME Camerin (Italy) F Schiavone	4	6	[8]
(Italy) F Pennetta (Australia) B Stewart	6	4	[10]
WC	(Slovakia) J Husárová (Switzerland) P Schnyder	7	7^{7}
(Croatia) J Kostanić Tošić (Australia) N Pratt	5	6^{5}
(United States) C Morariu (United States) M Shaughnessy	4	5
3	(India) S Mirza (Italy) M Santangelo	6	7
(Belarus) V Azarenka (Russia) M Kirilenko	6	6
(Greece) E Daniilidou (Germany) J Wöhr	4	4
(Ukraine) A Bondarenko (Ukraine) K Bondarenko	3	2
2	(Czech Republic) K Peschke (Australia) R Stubbs	6	6

Quarterfinals
1	(Zimbabwe) C Black (United States) L Huber	w	/	o
(Hungary) Á Szávay (Czech Republic) V Uhlířová
(Czech Republic) I Benešová (United States) B Mattek	6	6
(Italy) F Pennetta (Australia) B Stewart	4	1
WC	(Slovakia) J Husárová (Switzerland) P Schnyder	3	5
3	(India) S Mirza (Italy) M Santangelo	6	7
(Belarus) V Azarenka (Russia) M Kirilenko	6	5	[2]
2	(Czech Republic) K Peschke (Australia) R Stubbs	3	7	[10]

Semifinals
1	(Zimbabwe) C Black (United States) L Huber	4	6	[10]
(Czech Republic) I Benešová (United States) B Mattek	6	0	[5]
3	(India) S Mirza (Italy) M Santangelo	2	6	[10]
2	(Czech Republic) K Peschke (Australia) R Stubbs	6	3	[5]

Finals
1	(Zimbabwe) C Black (United States) L Huber	1	2
3	(India) S Mirza (Italy) M Santangelo	6	6
