= 2005 Pilot Pen Tennis – Men's singles =

Men's singles for 2005 Pilot Pen Tennis

Men's singles
- 2005 Pilot Pen Tennis

Final
- Champion: (United States) James Blake
- Runner-up: (Spain) Feliciano López
- Score: 3–6, 7–5, 6–1

Events
| Singles | men | women |
| Doubles | men | women |
- Pilot Pen Tennis

Lleyton Hewitt was the defending champion, but did not participate.

Wildcard James Blake won the title, defeating Feliciano López 3–6, 7–5, 6–1 in the final.

== Seeds ==
All seeds receive a bye into the second round.

1. (Russia) Nikolay Davydenko (second round)
2. (Chile) Fernando González (third round)
3. (Spain) David Ferrer (semifinals)
4. (Spain) Tommy Robredo (quarterfinals)
5. (Spain) Feliciano López (final)
6. (Germany) Tommy Haas (third round)
7. (Chile) Nicolás Massú (third round)
8. (Belgium) Olivier Rochus (second round)
9. (United Kingdom) Greg Rusedski (withdrew due to fatigue)
10. (Italy) Filippo Volandri (second round)
11. (Austria) Jürgen Melzer (second round)
12. (United States) Vincent Spadea (third round)
13. (France) Paul-Henri Mathieu (second round)
14. (Sweden) Robin Söderling (second round)
15. (Thailand) Paradorn Srichaphan (third round)
16. (France) Gaël Monfils (second round)

== Draw ==
Key

- Q = Qualifier
- WC = Wild card
- LL = Lucky loser
- Alt = Alternate
- ITF = ITF entry
- PR = Protected ranking
- SR = Special ranking
- SE = Special exempt
- JE = Junior exempt
- JR = Junior Accelerator Programme entrant
- CO = College Accelerator Programme entrant
- NG = Next Gen Accelerator Program entrant
- w/o = Walkover
- r = Retired
- d = Defaulted

=== Finals ===
Quarterfinals
(Argentina) Juan Ignacio Chela | 6^{4} | 6 | 3
WC | (United States) James Blake | 7^{7} | 4 | 6
4 | (Spain) Tommy Robredo | 7^{7} | 4 | 4
(Romania) Victor Hănescu | 6^{4} | 6 | 6
(Russia) Igor Andreev | 3 | 4
3 | (Spain) David Ferrer | 6 | 6
5 | (Spain) Feliciano López | 6 | 1 | 6
(Spain) Fernando Verdasco | 4 | 6 | 2

Semifinals
WC | (United States) James Blake | 7^{7} | 6^{3} | 6
(Romania) Victor Hănescu | 6^{4} | 7^{7} | 1
3 | (Spain) David Ferrer | 6 | 3 | 2
5 | (Spain) Feliciano López | 4 | 6 | 6

Final
WC | (United States) James Blake | 3 | 7 | 6
5 | (Spain) Feliciano López | 6 | 5 | 1

=== Top half ===
==== Section 1 ====
First round
(Cyprus) M Baghdatis | 2 | 4
(Argentina) JI Chela | 6 | 6
(Denmark) K Carlsen | 3 | 0
(France) F Santoro | 6 | 6
(France) M Llodra | 1 | 4
WC | (United States) J Blake | 6 | 6
(Spain) A Martín | 5 | 1
(Belgium) C Rochus | 7 | 6

Second round
1 | (Russia) N Davydenko | 1 | 6^{5}
(Argentina) JI Chela | 6 | 7^{7}
(France) F Santoro | 6 | 7^{7}
13 | (France) P-H Mathieu | 4 | 6^{2}
10 | (Italy) F Volandri | 1 | 3
WC | (United States) J Blake | 6 | 6
(Belgium) C Rochus | 2 | 6 | 0
6 | (Germany) T Haas | 6 | 4 | 6

Third round
(Argentina) JI Chela | 6 | 6
(France) F Santoro | 4 | 1
WC | (United States) J Blake | 1 | 6 | 6
6 | (Germany) T Haas | 6 | 3 | 3

Quarterfinals
(Argentina) JI Chela | 6^{4} | 6 | 3
WC | (United States) J Blake | 7^{7} | 4 | 6

==== Section 2 ====
First round
WC | (United States) S Jenkins | 2 | 6 | 6
(Finland) J Nieminen | 6 | 3 | 4
Q | (Austria) S Koubek | 6 | 6
WC | (United States) B Reynolds | 3 | 4
(Romania) V Hănescu | 6^{4} | 7^{7} | 7^{7}
(Peru) L Horna | 7^{7} | 6^{5} | 6^{5}
Q | (Israel) A Ram | 6 | 6
(Brazil) R Mello | 1 | 4

Second round
4 | (Spain) T Robredo | 6 | 3 | 6
WC | (United States) S Jenkins | 2 | 6 | 4
Q | (Austria) S Koubek | 4 | 7 | 7
16 | (France) G Monfils | 6 | 5 | 5
LL | (Czech Republic) I Minář | 3 | 2
(Romania) V Hănescu | 6 | 6
Q | (Israel) A Ram | 4 | 7 | 5
7 | (Chile) N Massú | 6 | 5 | 7

Third round
4 | (Spain) T Robredo | 6 | 6
Q | (Austria) S Koubek | 2 | 2
(Romania) V Hănescu | 6 | 6
7 | (Chile) N Massú | 4 | 4

Quarterfinals
4 | (Spain) T Robredo | 7^{7} | 4 | 4
(Romania) V Hănescu | 6^{4} | 6 | 6

=== Bottom half ===
==== Section 3 ====
First round
(Argentina) J Mónaco | 3 | 4
(Russia) I Andreev | 6 | 6
(Germany) P Kohlschreiber | 6 | 6
(United States) M Fish | 4 | 4
(Switzerland) S Wawrinka | 3 | 2
(France) C Saulnier | 6 | 6
(Luxembourg) G Müller | 4 | 6 | 3
(Czech Republic) T Zíb | 6 | 3 | 6

Second round
8 | (Belgium) O Rochus | 6^{1} | 6^{2}
(Russia) I Andreev | 7^{7} | 7^{7}
(Germany) P Kohlschreiber | 6 | 6
11 | (Austria) J Melzer | 4 | 1
15 | (Thailand) P Srichaphan | 7^{7} | 7^{7}
(France) C Saulnier | 6^{3} | 6^{5}
(Czech Republic) T Zíb | 3 | 3
3 | (Spain) D Ferrer | 6 | 6

Third round
(Russia) I Andreev | 6 | 6
(Germany) P Kohlschreiber | 2 | 3
15 | (Thailand) P Srichaphan | 4 | 2
3 | (Spain) D Ferrer | 6 | 6

Quarterfinals
(Russia) I Andreev | 3 | 4
3 | (Spain) D Ferrer | 6 | 6

==== Section 4 ====
First round
(Italy) D Sanguinetti | 7^{8} | 6
(United States) K Kim | 6^{6} | 3
(Russia) D Tursunov | 6 | 3 | 4
Q | (Italy) A Seppi | 1 | 6 | 6
(Czech Republic) J Hernych | 0 | 4
(Spain) F Verdasco | 6 | 6
WC | (United States) J Gimelstob | 3 | 7 | 7^{7}
Q | (Spain) G García López | 6 | 5 | 6^{4}

Second round
5 | (Spain) F López | 6 | 6
(Italy) D Sanguinetti | 4 | 3
Q | (Italy) A Seppi | 3 | 5
12 | (United States) V Spadea | 6 | 7
14 | (Sweden) R Söderling | 6^{3} | 6^{4}
(Spain) F Verdasco | 7^{7} | 7^{7}
WC | (United States) J Gimelstob | 2 | 6 | 4
2 | (Chile) F González | 6 | 3 | 6

Third round
5 | (Spain) F López | 6^{5} | 6 | 6
12 | (United States) V Spadea | 7^{7} | 3 | 4
(Spain) F Verdasco | 6^{3} | 7 | 7^{7}
2 | (Chile) F González | 7^{7} | 5 | 6^{3}

Quarterfinals
5 | (Spain) F López | 6 | 1 | 6
(Spain) F Verdasco | 4 | 6 | 2
