= 2005 Pilot Pen Tennis =

Tennis tournament

- Date: August 21–27
- Edition: 21st
- Category: International Series (ATP); Tier II (WTA)
- Surface: Hard / outdoor
- Location: New Haven, Connecticut, U.S.
- Venue: Cullman-Heyman Tennis Center

Champions

Men's singles
- (United States) James Blake

Women's singles
- (United States) Lindsay Davenport

Men's doubles
- (Argentina) Gastón Etlis / (Argentina) Martín Rodríguez

Women's doubles
- (United States) Lisa Raymond / (Australia) Samantha Stosur
← 2004 ·	Pilot Pen Tennis	· 2006 →

The 2005 Pilot Pen Tennis was a tennis tournament played on outdoor hard courts. It was the 21st edition of the Pilot Pen Tennis, and is part of the International Series of the 2005 ATP Tour, and of the Tier II Series of the 2005 WTA Tour. It took place at the Cullman-Heyman Tennis Center in New Haven, Connecticut, United States, from August 21 through August 27, 2005.

== Finals ==
=== Men's singles ===
(United States) James Blake defeated (Spain) Feliciano López 3–6, 7–5, 6–1

- It was Blake's 1st title of the year and the 2nd of his career.

=== Women's singles ===
(United States) Lindsay Davenport defeated (France) Amélie Mauresmo 6–4, 6–4

- It was Davenport's 3rd title of the year and the 48th of her career.

=== Men's doubles ===
(Argentina) Gastón Etlis / (Argentina) Martín Rodríguez defeated (United States) Rajeev Ram / (United States) Bobby Reynolds 6–4, 6–3

- It was Etlis's 1st title of the year and the 4th of his career. It was Rodríguez's 1st title of the year and the 5th of his career.

=== Women's doubles ===
(United States) Lisa Raymond / (Australia) Samantha Stosur defeated (Argentina) Gisela Dulko / (Russia) Maria Kirilenko 6–2, 6–7^{(6–8)}, 6–1

- It was Raymond's 2nd title of the year and the 46th of her career. It was Stosur's 3rd title of the year and the 3rd of her career.
