= 2007 Pilot Pen Tennis =

- Date: August 17–25
- Edition: 39th
- Surface: Hard / outdoor
- Location: New Haven, United States
- Venue: Cullman-Heyman Tennis Center

Champions

Men's singles
- (United States) James Blake

Women's singles
- (Russia) Svetlana Kuznetsova

Men's doubles
- (India) Mahesh Bhupathi / (Serbia) Nenad Zimonjić

Women's doubles
- (India) Sania Mirza / (Italy) Mara Santangelo
- Pilot Pen Tennis

The 2007 Pilot Pen Tennis was the 2007 edition of the Pilot Pen Tennis tournament, located in New Haven, Connecticut. It took place on August 17–25, the final week before the U.S. Open began.

James Blake won his second title of the year and 10th overall, while Svetlana Kuznetsova won her first title of the year and 9th overall.

== Finals ==
=== Men's singles ===
(United States) James Blake defeated (United States) Mardy Fish 7–5, 6–4

=== Women's singles ===
(Russia) Svetlana Kuznetsova defeated (Hungary) Ágnes Szávay, 4–6, 3–0 retired

=== Men's doubles ===
(India) Mahesh Bhupathi / (Serbia) Nenad Zimonjić defeated (Poland) Mariusz Fyrstenberg / (Poland) Marcin Matkowski, 6–3, 6–3

=== Women's doubles ===
(India) Sania Mirza / (Italy) Mara Santangelo defeated (Zimbabwe) Cara Black / (United States) Liezel Huber 6–1, 6–2
