= 2004 Pilot Pen Tennis =

- Date: August 22–28
- Edition: 22nd
- Category: Tier II
- Draw: 28S / 16D
- Prize money: USD585,000
- Surface: Hard / outdoor
- Location: New Haven, Connecticut, U.S.
- Venue: Cullman-Heyman Tennis Center

Champions

Singles
- (Russia) Elena Bovina

Doubles
- (Russia) Nadia Petrova / (United States) Meghann Shaughnessy
- Connecticut Open

The 2004 Pilot Pen Tennis was a women's tennis tournament played on outdoor hard courts. It was the 22nd edition of the Pilot Pen Tennis and was part of the Tier II Series of the 2004 WTA Tour. It took place at the Cullman-Heyman Tennis Center in New Haven, United States, from August 22 through August 28, 2004. Seventh-seeded Elena Bovina won the singles title and earned $93,000 first-prize money.

== Finals ==
=== Singles ===
- (Russia) Elena Bovina defeated (France) Nathalie Dechy 6–2, 2–6, 7–5

=== Doubles ===
- (Russia) Nadia Petrova / (United States) Meghann Shaughnessy defeated (United States) Martina Navratilova / (United States) Lisa Raymond 6–1, 1–6, 7–6^{(7–4)}
