= Westville Music Bowl =

Tennis center in New Haven, Connecticut, US

Coordinates: 41.311533°N 72.958682°W

- Interactive map of the Westville Music Bowl area
- Alternative names: Connecticut Open

General information
- Status: Closed for conversion to Music Venue
- Architectural style: Stadium
- Location: New Haven, Connecticut
- Groundbreaking: 1989
- Completed: 1991
- Landlord: Yale University, City of New Haven

Design and construction
- Architects: Edward Larrabee Barnes and John MY Lee Associates
- Structural engineer: Spiegal Zamecnik & Shah Inc.
- Main contractor: Concrete: Blakeslee Prestress, INC

Renovating team
- Architects: GREGG WIES & GARDNER ARCHITECTS, LLC

Other information
- Seating capacity: 15,000

The Westville Music Bowl is an outdoor stadium at the Cullman–Heyman Tennis Center an 8-court indoor intercollegiate tennis facility and outdoor stadium located on the campus of Yale University in New Haven, Connecticut.

== Construction ==
When the USTA/Volvo Tennis announced in 1989 that the Volvo Tennis Tournament was going be held annually at Yale University and City of New Haven (site of a US Open qualifier tournament for ATP and WTA players), the organizers chose Architects Edward Larrabee Barnes and John My Lee Architects to build the permanent facility in 1991 due to Barnes' previous Yale projects. The entire design and construction process took only 11 months from start to finish, most of the structure was made of prefab concrete components made on site and pieced together. This was done by Blakeslee Prestress Inc.

Lead architect, Lee, an avid tennis player and fan, said the open sides, "Reduced the fishbowl effect and made the construction access much easier."

== Tennis venue ==
The Cullman–Heyman Tennis Center is part of the Yale University tennis complex which consists of 12 outdoor and 8 indoor DecoTurf hardcourts. Across Yale Avenue from the Yale Tennis Complex is the Connecticut Tennis Center Stadium, which hosted men's and women's professional tennis tournaments, hosted its last WTA tournament in 2018. In 2019 approval was given to convert the stadium into a concert venue. The outdoor stadium was built in 1991 for the Volvo Tennis Championships, and by 2009 it had seats for 15,000 spectators. The current capacity of the Connecticut Tennis Center Stadium is around 15,000, making it the third largest tennis venue in the United States and one of the largest in the world by capacity, behind the French Open's Roland Garros Stadium. The Cullman–Heyman Tennis Center is located at 279 Derby Avenue, West Haven, CT 06516. The facility has a master scoreboard and there are HD video cameras on every court that support streaming. All eight courts also have individual scoreboards.

The facility has hosted major intercollegiate national championships like the ITA Indoor Collegiate Individual Championships in 2009 and the ITA Women's Team Championships in February 2017. CHTC also hosts the ECAC Championships and the ITA Regional Individual Championships every year.

== Concert venue ==
In 2021 the main stadium was converted into a full-time concert venue managed by The Bowery Presents, that started operations in 2024. Before this full time conversion the 1991 stadium had been used periodically for concerts. The conversion came from significant pressure from both the city and state governments to increase the number of large-capacity concert venues in the state, to make it more of a tourist destination.

== See also ==
- List of tennis stadiums by capacity
