= Connecticut Open (tennis) =

Defunct tennis tournament
- Tour: WTA Tour
- Founded: 1948
- Abolished: 2019
- Editions: 50
- Location: New Haven, Connecticut; United States
- Category: ATP World Series (1990–1997); ATP International Series (1998–2008); ATP World Tour 250 series (2009–2010); WTA Tier IV (1988–1989); WTA Tier III (1990–1994); WTA Tier II (1997–2008); WTA Premier (2009–2018)
- Surface: Hard / outdoor

The Connecticut Open was a professional tennis tournament played on outdoor hard courts under various names and in various venues from 1948 until 2019.

It was most recently a Women's Tennis Association (WTA) Premier Tournament on the WTA Tour, held annually at the Cullman-Heyman Tennis Center in New Haven, Connecticut, United States, just before the fourth and last Grand Slam tournament of the year, the US Open. From 2005 through 2010, the tournament was also part of the ATP World Tour 250 series of the ATP Tour.

In 2019, the tournament sanction was sold to APG, a sports and entertainment company, which transferred it to Zhengzhou, China.

== History ==
The tournament was created in 1948 as the U.S. Women's Hardcourt Championships and first played in Sacramento, California, in the United States. Over the 20 years of its first run, the event was held in various locations in the western United States: San Francisco; Berkeley, California; Salt Lake City, Utah; Seattle, Washington; La Jolla, California; and Denver, Colorado. Among the winners of the event were Doris Hart, Darlene Hard, Nancy Richey, Rosemary Casals, Billie Jean King, and Jane Bartkowicz. The event was discontinued in 1969 after the beginning of the Open Era.

In 1988, the United States Tennis Association (USTA) reinstated the tournament. The first edition of the new U.S. Women's Hardcourt Championships was held that year in San Antonio, Texas, first as part of Tier IV of the WTA Tour, then as an upgraded Tier III event in 1990. The championships were sponsored by Post Cereals in 1990 and by Acura from 1992 to 1994. Over the first years of its second run, the tournament was won by several past or future World No. 1s, including Steffi Graf, Monica Seles, and Martina Navratilova. The event was held in Stratton Mountain, Vermont, in 1993 and 1994, but conflicts with the 1996 Summer Olympics prevented the tournament from being held the following two years. In 1997, the event returned again, now within Tier II and first in Stone Mountain, Georgia, then settling in 1998 in New Haven, Connecticut, under the new sponsorship of Pilot Pen. In the first years of its run in New Haven, the renamed Pilot Pen International saw its competition dominated by Lindsay Davenport (four-time runner-up in New Haven, one previous time in Stone Mountain, and 2005 champion) and Venus Williams (four-time champion from 1999 to 2002).

New Haven was already host to a men's tournament, the Pilot Pen International. It was created in 1973 in Bretton Woods, New Hampshire, as the Volvo International, and moved to Connecticut in 1990, where it took Pilot Pen sponsorship in 1997. When the men's event was cancelled in 1999, the women's Pilot Pen tournament remained the only one of the region.

In 2005, the USTA purchased the men's tournament of Long Island, New York, and merged it with the women's Pilot Pen International to create Pilot Pen Tennis, the first large joint ATP–WTA tournament leading to the US Open. The tournament became the last event of the US Open Series and continued to attract top players, including champions Caroline Wozniacki, Svetlana Kuznetsova, James Blake, Justine Henin, and Nikolay Davydenko.

In 2011, after the men's competition moved to Winston-Salem, the newly women's-only event was renamed the New Haven Open at Yale. In 2014, it was renamed the Connecticut Open.

In 2019, the Connecticut Open ended due to a lack of funding. The tournament's sanction was sold and assigned to Zhengzhou, China, after the 2019 US Open. In 2021, the Tennis in the Land tournament in Cleveland took over its former spot on the WTA schedule.

== Past finals ==
=== Women's singles ===
Location	Year	Champion	Runner-up	Score
San Francisco	1948*	(United States) Gussie Moran	(United States) Virginia Wolfenden Kovacs	2–6, 6–1, 6–2
San Francisco	1949*	(United States) Doris Hart	(United States) Dorothy Head Knode	6–3, 6–4
Berkeley, California	1950*	(United States) Patricia Canning Todd	(Romania) Magda Rurac	6–2, 6–1
Salt Lake City	1951	(United States) Patricia Canning Todd (2)	(United States) Anita Kanter	6–1, 6–4
Seattle	1952	(United States) Mary Arnold Prentiss	(United States) Anita Kanter	6–1, 8–6
Salt Like City	1953	(United States) Anita Kanter	(United States) Joan Merciadis	6–0, 6–4
Salt Like City	1954	(United States) Beverly Baker Fleitz	(United States) Barbara Green	6–1, 6–3
La Jolla, California	1955	(United States) Mimi Arnold	(United States) Patricia Canning Todd	6–0, 6–0
La Jolla, California	1956	(United States) Nancy Chaffee Kiner	(United States) Patricia Canning Todd	6–4, 5–7, 7–5
La Jolla, California	1957	(United States) Beverly Baker Fleitz (2)	(United States) Mimi Arnold	6–1, 6–1
La Jolla, California	1958	(United States) Beverly Baker Fleitz (3)	(United States) Karen Hantze	6–1, 8–6
Denver, Colorado	1959	(South Africa) Sandra Reynolds	(United States) Beverly Baker Fleitz	6–3, 6–2
La Jolla, California	1960	(United States) Katherine D. Chabot	(United States) Karen Hantze	4–6, 7–5, 7–5
La Jolla, California	1961	(United States) Nancy Richey	(United States) Dorothy Head Knode	6–1, 6–1
Seattle	1962	(United States) Carol Hanks	(United States) Marilyn Montgomery	7–5, 6–3
La Jolla, California	1963	(United States) Darlene Hard	(United States) Tory Fretz	6–1, 8–6
Sacramento, California	1964	(United States) Kathleen Harter	(United States) Kathy Blake	6–1, 6–0
Sacramento, California	1965	(United States) Rosemary Casals	(United States) Kathleen Harter	6–4, 4–6, 6–2
La Jolla, California	1966	(United States) Billie Jean King	(United States) Patti Hogan	7–5, 6–0
Sacramento, California	1967	(United States) Jane "Peaches" Bartkowicz	(United States) Valerie Ziegenfuss	6–4, 6–4
La Jolla, California	1968	(South Africa) Maryna Godwin	(United States) Janet Newberry	6–3, 8–6
Sacramento, California	1969	(United States) Eliza Pande	(United States) Kristien Kemmer	7–5, 6–4
	1970– 1987	Not held		
San Antonio, Texas	1988	(Germany) Steffi Graf	(Bulgaria) Katerina Maleeva	6–4, 6–1
San Antonio, Texas	1989	(Germany) Steffi Graf (2)	(United States) Ann Henricksson	6–1, 6–4
San Antonio, Texas	1990	(Socialist Federal Republic of Yugoslavia) Monica Seles	(Switzerland) Manuela Maleeva-Fragnière	6–4, 6–3
San Antonio, Texas	1991	(Germany) Steffi Graf (3)	(Socialist Federal Republic of Yugoslavia) Monica Seles	6–4, 6–3
San Antonio, Texas	1992	(United States) Martina Navratilova	(France) Nathalie Tauziat	6–2, 6–1
Stratton Mountain, Vermont	1993	(Spain) Conchita Martínez	(United States) Zina Garrison	6–3, 6–2
Stratton Mountain, Vermont	1994	(Spain) Conchita Martínez (2)	(Spain) Arantxa Sánchez Vicario	4–6, 6–3, 6–4
	1995	Not held		
	1996	Not held		
Stone Mountain, Georgia	1997	(United States) Lindsay Davenport	(France) Sandrine Testud	6–4, 6–1
New Haven, Connecticut	1998	(Germany) Steffi Graf (4)	(Czech Republic) Jana Novotná	6–4, 6–1
New Haven, Connecticut	1999	(United States) Venus Williams	(United States) Lindsay Davenport	6–2, 7–5
New Haven, Connecticut	2000	(United States) Venus Williams (2)	(United States) Monica Seles	6–2, 6–4
New Haven, Connecticut	2001	(United States) Venus Williams (3)	(United States) Lindsay Davenport	7–6^{(8–6)}, 6–4
New Haven, Connecticut	2002	(United States) Venus Williams (4)	(United States) Lindsay Davenport	7–5, 6–0
New Haven, Connecticut	2003	(United States) Jennifer Capriati	(United States) Lindsay Davenport	6–2, 4–0 retired
New Haven, Connecticut	2004	(Russia) Elena Bovina	(France) Nathalie Dechy	6–2, 2–6, 7–5
New Haven, Connecticut	2005	(United States) Lindsay Davenport (2)	(France) Amélie Mauresmo	6–4, 6–4
New Haven, Connecticut	2006	(Belgium) Justine Henin	(United States) Lindsay Davenport	6–0, 1–0 retired
New Haven, Connecticut	2007	(Russia) Svetlana Kuznetsova	(Hungary) Ágnes Szávay	4–6, 3–0 retired
New Haven, Connecticut	2008	(Denmark) Caroline Wozniacki	(Russia) Anna Chakvetadze	3–6, 6–4, 6–1
New Haven, Connecticut	2009	(Denmark) Caroline Wozniacki (2)	(Russia) Elena Vesnina	6–2, 6–4
New Haven, Connecticut	2010	(Denmark) Caroline Wozniacki (3)	(Russia) Nadia Petrova	6–3, 3–6, 6–3
New Haven, Connecticut	2011	(Denmark) Caroline Wozniacki (4)	(Czech Republic) Petra Cetkovská	6–4, 6–1
New Haven, Connecticut	2012	(Czech Republic) Petra Kvitová	(Russia) Maria Kirilenko	7–6^{(11–9)}, 7–5
New Haven, Connecticut	2013	(Romania) Simona Halep	(Czech Republic) Petra Kvitová	6–2, 6–2
New Haven, Connecticut	2014	(Czech Republic) Petra Kvitová (2)	(Slovakia) Magdaléna Rybáriková	6–4, 6–2
New Haven, Connecticut	2015	(Czech Republic) Petra Kvitová (3)	(Czech Republic) Lucie Šafářová	6–7^{(6–8)}, 6–2, 6–2
New Haven, Connecticut	2016	(Poland) Agnieszka Radwańska	(Ukraine) Elina Svitolina	6–1, 7–6^{(7–3)}
New Haven, Connecticut	2017	(Australia) Daria Gavrilova	(Slovakia) Dominika Cibulková	4–6, 6–3, 6–4
New Haven, Connecticut	2018	(Belarus) Aryna Sabalenka	(Spain) Carla Suárez Navarro	6–1, 6–4

- From 1948 through 1950, the U.S. Women's Hardcourt Championships were a combined event with the Pacific Coast Championships.

=== Women's doubles ===
Location	Year	Champions	Runners-up	Score
New Haven	2018	(Czech Republic) Andrea Sestini Hlaváčková (Czech Republic) Barbora Strýcová	(Chinese Taipei) Hsieh Su-wei (Germany) Laura Siegemund	6–4, 6–7^{(7–9)}, [10–4]
New Haven	2017	(Canada) Gabriela Dabrowski (China) Xu Yifan	(Australia) Ashleigh Barty (Australia) Casey Dellacqua	3–6, 6–3, [10–8]
New Haven	2016	(India) Sania Mirza (3) (Romania) Monica Niculescu	(Ukraine) Kateryna Bondarenko (Chinese Taipei) Chuang Chia-jung	7–5, 6–4
New Haven	2015	(Germany) Julia Görges (Czech Republic) Lucie Hradecká	(Chinese Taipei) Chuang Chia-jung (China) Liang Chen	6–3, 6–1
New Haven	2014	(Slovenia) Andreja Klepač (Spain) Sílvia Soler Espinosa	(New Zealand) Marina Erakovic (Spain) Arantxa Parra Santonja	7–5, 4–6, [10–7]
New Haven	2013	(India) Sania Mirza (2) (China) Zheng Jie (2)	(Spain) Anabel Medina Garrigues (Slovenia) Katarina Srebotnik	6–3, 6–4
New Haven	2012	(United States) Liezel Huber (United States) Lisa Raymond (4)	(Czech Republic) Andrea Hlaváčková (Czech Republic) Lucie Hradecká	4–6, 6–0, [10–4]
New Haven	2011	(Chinese Taipei) Chuang Chia-jung (Belarus) Olga Govortsova	(Italy) Sara Errani (Italy) Roberta Vinci	7–5, 6–2
New Haven	2010	(Czech Republic) Květa Peschke (Slovenia) Katarina Srebotnik	(United States) Bethanie Mattek-Sands (United States) Meghann Shaughnessy	7–5, 6–0
New Haven	2009	(Spain) Nuria Llagostera Vives (Spain) María José Martínez Sánchez	(Czech Republic) Iveta Benešová (Czech Republic) Lucie Hradecká	6–2, 7–5
New Haven	2008	(Czech Republic) Květa Peschke (United States) Lisa Raymond (3)	(Romania) Sorana Cîrstea (Romania) Monica Niculescu	4–6, 7–5, [10–7]
New Haven	2007	(India) Sania Mirza (Italy) Mara Santangelo	(Zimbabwe) Cara Black (United States) Liezel Huber	6–1, 6–2
New Haven	2006	(China) Yan Zi (China) Zheng Jie	(United States) Lisa Raymond (Australia) Samantha Stosur	6–4, 6–2
New Haven	2005	(United States) Lisa Raymond (2) (Australia) Samantha Stosur	(Argentina) Gisela Dulko (Russia) Maria Kirilenko	6–2, 6–7^{(1–7)}, 6–1
New Haven	2004	(Russia) Nadia Petrova (United States) Meghann Shaughnessy	(United States) Martina Navratilova (United States) Lisa Raymond	6–1, 1–6, 7–6^{(7–4)}
New Haven	2003	(Spain) Virginia Ruano Pascual (Argentina) Paola Suárez	(Australia) Alicia Molik (Spain) Magüi Serna	7–6^{(8–6)}, 6–3
New Haven	2002	(Slovakia) Daniela Hantuchová (Spain) Arantxa Sánchez Vicario	(Italy) Tathiana Garbin (Slovakia) Janette Husárová	7–6, 1–6, 7–5
New Haven	2001	(Zimbabwe) Cara Black (Russia) Elena Likhovtseva	(Federal Republic of Yugoslavia) Jelena Dokić (Russia) Nadia Petrova	6–0, 3–6, 6–2
New Haven	2000	(France) Julie Halard-Decugis (Japan) Ai Sugiyama	(Spain) Virginia Ruano Pascual (Argentina) Paola Suárez	6–4, 5–7, 6–2
New Haven	1999	(United States) Lisa Raymond (Australia) Rennae Stubbs	(Russia) Elena Likhovtseva (Czech Republic) Jana Novotná	7–6^{(7–1)}, 6–2
New Haven	1998	(France) Alexandra Fusai (France) Nathalie Tauziat	(South Africa) Mariaan de Swardt (Czech Republic) Jana Novotná	6–1, 6–0
Stone Mt.	1997	(United States) Nicole Arendt (Netherlands) Manon Bollegraf	(France) Alexandra Fusai (France) Nathalie Tauziat	6–7^{(5–7)}, 6–3, 6–2
	1996	Not held		
	1995	Not held		
Stratton Mountain	1994	(Australia) Elizabeth Sayers-Smylie (2) (United States) Pam Shriver (3)	(Spain) Conchita Martínez (Spain) Arantxa Sánchez Vicario	7–6^{(7–4)}, 2–6, 7–5
Stratton Mountain	1993	(Australia) Elizabeth Sayers-Smylie (Czech Republic) Helena Suková (2)	(Switzerland) Manuela Maleeva-Fragnière (Argentina) Mercedes Paz	6–1, 6–2
San Antonio	1992	(United States) Martina Navratilova (United States) Pam Shriver (2)	(United States) Patty Fendick (Czechoslovakia) Andrea Strnadová	3–6, 6–2, 7–6^{(7–4)}
San Antonio	1991	(United States) Patty Fendick (Socialist Federal Republic of Yugoslavia) Monica Seles	(Canada) Jill Hetherington (United States) Kathy Rinaldi	7–6^{(7–2)}, 6–2
San Antonio	1990	(United States) Kathy Jordan (Australia) Elizabeth Sayers-Smylie	(United States) Gigi Fernández (United States) Robin White	7–5, 7–5
San Antonio	1989	(United States) Katrina Adams (United States) Pam Shriver	(United States) Patty Fendick (Canada) Jill Hetherington	3–6, 6–1, 6–4
San Antonio	1988	(United States) Lori McNeil (Czechoslovakia) Helena Suková	(South Africa) Rosalyn Fairbank (United States) Gretchen Rush-Magers	6–3, 6–7^{(5–7)}, 6–2

=== Men's singles ===
Location	Year	Champions	Runners-up	Score
Long Island (exhibition)	1981	(United States) Brian Teacher	(France) Yannick Noah	4–6, 6–3, 6–4
Long Island (exhibition)	1982	(United States) Gene Mayer	(United States) Johan Kriek	6–2, 6–3
Long Island (exhibition)	1983	(United States) Gene Mayer	(Switzerland) Heinz Günthardt	6–7^{(9–11)}, 6–4, 6–0
Long Island (exhibition)	1984	(Czech Republic) Ivan Lendl	(Ecuador) Andrés Gómez	6–2, 6–4
Long Island (exhibition)	1985	(Czech Republic) Ivan Lendl	(United States) Jimmy Connors	6–1, 6–3
Long Island (exhibition)	1986	(Czech Republic) Ivan Lendl	(United States) John McEnroe	6–2, 6–4
Long Island (exhibition)	1987	(Sweden) Jonas Svensson	(United States) David Pate	7–6, 3–6, 6–3
Long Island (exhibition)	1988	(United States) Andre Agassi	(France) Yannick Noah	6–3, 0–6, 6–4
Long Island (exhibition)	1989	(Czech Republic) Ivan Lendl	(Sweden) Mikael Pernfors	4–6, 6–2, 6–4
Long Island	1990	(Sweden) Stefan Edberg	(Socialist Federal Republic of Yugoslavia) Goran Ivanišević	7–6, 6–3
Long Island	1991	(Czech Republic) Ivan Lendl	(Sweden) Stefan Edberg	6–3, 6–2
Long Island	1992	(Czech Republic) Petr Korda	(United States) Ivan Lendl	6–2, 6–2
Long Island	1993	(Switzerland) Marc Rosset	(United States) Michael Chang	6–4, 3–6, 6–1
Long Island	1994	(Russia) Yevgeny Kafelnikov	(France) Cédric Pioline	5–7, 6–1, 6–2
Long Island	1995	(Russia) Yevgeny Kafelnikov	(Netherlands) Jan Siemerink	7–6^{(7–0)}, 6–2
Long Island	1996	(Ukraine) Andrei Medvedev	(Czech Republic) Martin Damm	7–5, 6–3
Long Island	1997	(Spain) Carlos Moyá	(Australia) Patrick Rafter	6–4, 7–6^{(7–1)}
Long Island	1998	(Australia) Patrick Rafter	(Spain) Félix Mantilla	7–6^{(7–3)}, 6–2
Long Island	1999	(Sweden) Magnus Norman	(Spain) Àlex Corretja	7–6^{(7–4)}, 4–6, 6–3
Long Island	2000	(Sweden) Magnus Norman	(Sweden) Thomas Enqvist	6–3, 5–7, 7–5
Long Island	2001	(Germany) Tommy Haas	(United States) Pete Sampras	6–3, 3–6, 6–2
Long Island	2002	(Thailand) Paradorn Srichaphan	(Argentina) Juan Ignacio Chela	5–7, 6–2, 6–2
Long Island	2003	(Thailand) Paradorn Srichaphan	(United States) James Blake	6–2, 6–4
Long Island	2004	(Australia) Lleyton Hewitt	(Peru) Luis Horna	6–3, 6–1
New Haven	2005	(United States) James Blake	(Spain) Feliciano López	3–6, 7–5, 6–1
New Haven	2006	(Russia) Nikolay Davydenko	(Argentina) Agustín Calleri	6–4, 6–3
New Haven	2007	(United States) James Blake	(United States) Mardy Fish	7–5, 6–4
New Haven	2008	(Croatia) Marin Čilić	(United States) Mardy Fish	6–4, 4–6, 6–2
New Haven	2009	(Spain) Fernando Verdasco	(United States) Sam Querrey	6–4, 7–6^{(8–6)}
New Haven	2010	(Ukraine) Sergiy Stakhovsky	(Uzbekistan) Denis Istomin	3–6, 6–3, 6–4

=== Men's doubles ===
Location	Year	Champions	Runners-up	Score
Long Island	1990	(France) Guy Forget (Switzerland) Jakob Hlasek	(Germany) Udo Riglewski (Germany) Michael Stich	2–6, 6–3, 6–4
Long Island	1991	(Germany) Eric Jelen (Germany) Carl-Uwe Steeb	(United States) Doug Flach (Italy) Diego Nargiso	0–6, 6–4, 7–6
Long Island	1992	(United States) Francisco Montana (United States) Greg Van Emburgh	(Italy) Gianluca Pozzi (Finland) Olli Rahnasto	6–4, 6–2
Long Island	1993	(Germany) Marc-Kevin Goellner (Germany) David Prinosil	(France) Arnaud Boetsch (France) Olivier Delaître	6–7, 7–5, 6–2
Long Island	1994	(France) Olivier Delaître (France) Guy Forget	(Australia) Andrew Florent (United Kingdom) Mark Petchey	6–4, 7–6
Long Island	1995	(Czech Republic) Cyril Suk (Czech Republic) Daniel Vacek	(United States) Rick Leach (United States) Scott Melville	5–7, 7–6, 7–6
Long Island	1996	(United States) Luke Jensen (United States) Murphy Jensen	(Germany) Hendrik Dreekmann (Russia) Alexander Volkov	6–3, 7–6
Long Island	1997	(South Africa) Marcos Ondruska (Germany) David Prinosil	(United States) Mark Keil (United States) T. J. Middleton	6–4, 6–4
Long Island	1998	(Spain) Julian Alonso (Spain) Javier Sánchez	(United States) Brandon Coupe (United States) Dave Randall	6–4, 6–4
Long Island	1999	(France) Olivier Delaître (France) Fabrice Santoro	(United States) Jan-Michael Gambill (United States) Scott Humphries	7–5, 6–4
Long Island	2000	(United States) Jonathan Stark (Zimbabwe) Kevin Ullyett	(United States) Jan-Michael Gambill (United States) Scott Humphries	6–4, 6–4
Long Island	2001	(United States) Jonathan Stark (Zimbabwe) Kevin Ullyett	(Czech Republic) Leoš Friedl (Czech Republic) Radek Štěpánek	6–1, 6–4
Long Island	2002	(India) Mahesh Bhupathi (United States) Mike Bryan	(Czech Republic) Petr Pála (Czech Republic) Pavel Vízner	6–3, 6–4
Long Island	2003	(South Africa) Robbie Koenig (Argentina) Martín Rodríguez	(Czech Republic) Martin Damm (Czech Republic) Cyril Suk	6–3, 7–6
Long Island	2004	(France) Antony Dupuis (France) Michaël Llodra	(Switzerland) Yves Allegro (Germany) Michael Kohlmann	6–2, 6–4
New Haven	2005	(Argentina) Gastón Etlis (Argentina) Martín Rodríguez	(United States) Rajeev Ram (United States) Bobby Reynolds	6–4, 6–3
New Haven	2006	(Israel) Jonathan Erlich (Israel) Andy Ram	(Poland) Mariusz Fyrstenberg (Poland) Marcin Matkowski	6–3, 6–3
New Haven	2007	(India) Mahesh Bhupathi (Serbia) Nenad Zimonjić	(Poland) Mariusz Fyrstenberg (Poland) Marcin Matkowski	6–3, 6–3
New Haven	2008	(Brazil) Marcelo Melo (Brazil) André Sá	(India) Mahesh Bhupathi (The Bahamas) Mark Knowles	7–5, 6–2
New Haven	2009	(Austria) Julian Knowle (Austria) Jürgen Melzer	(Brazil) Bruno Soares (Zimbabwe) Kevin Ullyett	6–4, 7–6^{(7-3)}
New Haven	2010	(Sweden) Robert Lindstedt (Romania) Horia Tecău	(India) Rohan Bopanna (Pakistan) Aisam-ul-Haq Qureshi	6–4, 7–5

== 2011 earthquake ==
On August 23, 2011, 1:51 PM local time a 5.8 magnitude earthquake in Virginia stopped play for two hours while the main stadium was checked for damage by the fire department.

== See also ==
- Volvo International
- Connecticut State Championships (grass court event from 1895 to 1970).
