= 1999 Open Gaz de France =

- Date: 22–28 February
- Edition: 7th
- Category: Tier II
- Draw: 28S / 16D
- Surface: Hard / indoor
- Location: Paris, France
- Venue: Stade Pierre de Coubertin

Champions

Singles
- (United States) Serena Williams

Doubles
- (Romania) Irina Spîrlea / (Netherlands) Caroline Vis
| ← 1998 · | Open Gaz de France | · 2000 → |

The 1999 Open Gaz de France was a women's tennis tournament played on indoor hardcourts at the Stade Pierre de Coubertin in Paris in France that was part of Tier II of the 1999 WTA Tour. It was the seventh edition of the tournament and was held from 22 February until 28 February 1999. Unseeded Serena Williams won the singles title and earned $80,000 first-prize money. It was her first WTA singles title. On the same day her sister Venus won the IGA Superthrift Tennis Classic tournament, making them the first sisters to win WTA events in the same week.

== Finals ==
=== Singles ===
(United States) Serena Williams defeated (France) Amélie Mauresmo, 6–2, 3–6, 7–6^{(7–4)}

- It was Williams' 1st singles title of her career.

=== Doubles ===
(Romania) Irina Spîrlea / (Netherlands) Caroline Vis defeated (Russia) Elena Likhovtseva / (Japan) Ai Sugiyama, 7–5, 3–6, 6–3

== Entrants ==
=== Seeds ===
| Country | Player | Rank | Seed |
|---|---|---|---|
| SUI | Martina Hingis | 1 | 1 |
| FRA | Nathalie Tauziat | 9 | 2 |
| BEL | Dominique Van Roost | 11 | 3 |
| ROU | Irina Spîrlea | 15 | 4 |
| FRA | Sandrine Testud | 14 | 5 |
| FRA | Amélie Mauresmo | 18 | 6 |
| FRA | Julie Halard-Decugis | 21 | 7 |
| RUS | Elena Likhovtseva | 22 | 8 |

=== Other entrants ===
The following players received wildcards into the singles main draw:

- (France) Émilie Loit
- (Belgium) Sabine Appelmans
- (France) Amélie Cocheteux

The following players received wildcards into the doubles main draw:

- (France) Amélie Cocheteux / (France) Nathalie Dechy

The following players received entry from the singles qualifying draw:

- (Federal Republic of Yugoslavia) Sandra Načuk
- (Slovakia) Karina Habšudová
- (France) Anne-Gaëlle Sidot
- (Sweden) Åsa Carlsson

The following players received entry as lucky losers:

- (France) Laurence Andretto
- (Czech Republic) Sandra Kleinová
- (Belgium) Laurence Courtois

The following players received entry from the doubles qualifying draw:

- (Greece) Eleni Daniilidou / (Federal Republic of Yugoslavia) Sandra Načuk
