= 2000 Open Gaz de France – Singles =

Singles
- 2000 Open Gaz de France

Final
- Champion: (France) Nathalie Tauziat
- Runner-up: (United States) Serena Williams
- Score: 7–5, 6–2

Details
- Draw: 28
- Seeds: 8

Events
Singles	Doubles
← 1999 ·	Open Gaz de France	· 2001 →

Serena Williams was the defending champion, but lost in the final 7–5, 6–2 against Nathalie Tauziat.

== Seeds ==
The top four seeds received a bye to the second round.

1. (United States) Serena Williams (final)
2. (France) Nathalie Tauziat (champion)
3. (France) Julie Halard-Decugis (semifinals)
4. (Russia) Anna Kournikova (semifinals)
5. (France) Amélie Mauresmo (second round)
6. (France) Sandrine Testud (first round)
7. (Russia) Elena Likhovtseva (first round)
8. (Belgium) Dominique Van Roost (first round)

== Draw ==
=== Key ===
- Q = Qualifier
- WC = Wild card
- LL = Lucky loser
- Alt = Alternate
- SE = Special exempt
- PR = Protected ranking
- ITF = ITF entry
- JE = Junior exempt
- w/o = Walkover
- r = Retired
- d = Defaulted
- SR = Special ranking

=== Finals ===
Semifinals
1	(United States) Serena Williams	6	6
3	(France) Julie Halard-Decugis	4	2
4/WC	(Russia) Anna Kournikova	6^{6}	6	4
2	(France) Nathalie Tauziat	7^{8}	2	6

Final
1	(United States) Serena Williams	5	2
2	(France) Nathalie Tauziat	7	6

=== Top half ===
First round
(Belgium) S Appelmans	4	3
(Switzerland) P Schnyder	6	6
(Spain) M Serna	4	3
(France) S Pitkowski	6	6
(Romania) R Dragomir	1	1
5	(France) A Mauresmo	6	6
Q	(Czech Republic) D Chládková	5	5
Q	(France) L Andretto	7	7
(France) N Dechy	6	6
(Slovakia) K Habšudová	3	4
(Italy) S Farina	1	6	6
7	(Russia) E Likhovtseva	6	2	1

Second round
1	(United States) S Williams	6	6
(Switzerland) P Schnyder	2	2
(France) S Pitkowski	0	7^{7}	6
5	(France) A Mauresmo	6	6^{2}	2
3	(France) J Halard-Decugis	7	7^{7}
Q	(France) L Andretto	5	6^{1}
(France) N Dechy	6	6
(Italy) S Farina	0	3

Quarterfinals
1	(United States) S Williams	6	6
(France) S Pitkowski	1	1
3	(France) J Halard-Decugis	6	6
(France) N Dechy	2	4

Semifinals
1	(United States) S Williams	6	6
3	(France) J Halard-Decugis	4	2

=== Bottom half ===
First round
8	(Belgium) D Van Roost	4	2
(Romania) I Spîrlea	6	6
(Israel) A Smashnova	6	6
(Croatia) S Talaja	4	4
(Luxembourg) A Kremer	6	7^{7}
Q	(United Kingdom) L Latimer	3	6^{4}
6	(France) S Testud	1	2
(Germany) A Huber	6	6
(France) AG Sidot	4	6	7
WC	(France) A Cocheteux	6	1	5
WC	(Belgium) J Henin	6	7^{7}
Q	(Bulgaria) M Maleeva	4	6^{4}

Second round
(Romania) I Spîrlea	6	6
(Israel) A Smashnova	4	2
(Luxembourg) A Kremer	6^{2}	2
4/WC	(Russia) A Kournikova	7^{7}	6
(Germany) A Huber	6	1	4
(France) AG Sidot	4	6	6
WC	(Belgium) J Henin	5	6	4
2	(France) N Tauziat	7	2	6

Quarterfinals
(Romania) I Spîrlea	6	4	2
4/WC	(Russia) A Kournikova	4	6	6
(France) AG Sidot	5	1
2	(France) N Tauziat	7	6

Semifinals
4/WC	(Russia) A Kournikova	6^{6}	6	4
2	(France) N Tauziat	7^{8}	2	6
