= Serena Williams career statistics =

Tennis statistics of Serena Williams

Career finals
Discipline	Type	Won	Lost	Total
Singles	Grand Slam	23	10	33
Singles	Tour Finals	5	2	7
Singles	GS Cup	1	–	1
Singles	WTA 1000*	23	10	33
Singles	WTA Tour	20	3	23
Singles	Olympics	1	–	1
Singles	Total	73	25	98
Doubles	Grand Slam	14	–	14
Doubles	Tour Finals	–	–	–
Doubles	WTA 1000*	2	–	2
Doubles	WTA Tour	4	2	6
Doubles	Olympics	3	–	3
Doubles	Total	23	2	25
Mixed	Grand Slam	2	2	4
Mixed	Total	2	2	4
* formerly known as Tier I tournaments from 1990 to 2008 and Premier Mandatory & Premier 5 tournaments from 2009 to 2020.

This is a list of the main career statistics of professional American tennis player Serena Williams.

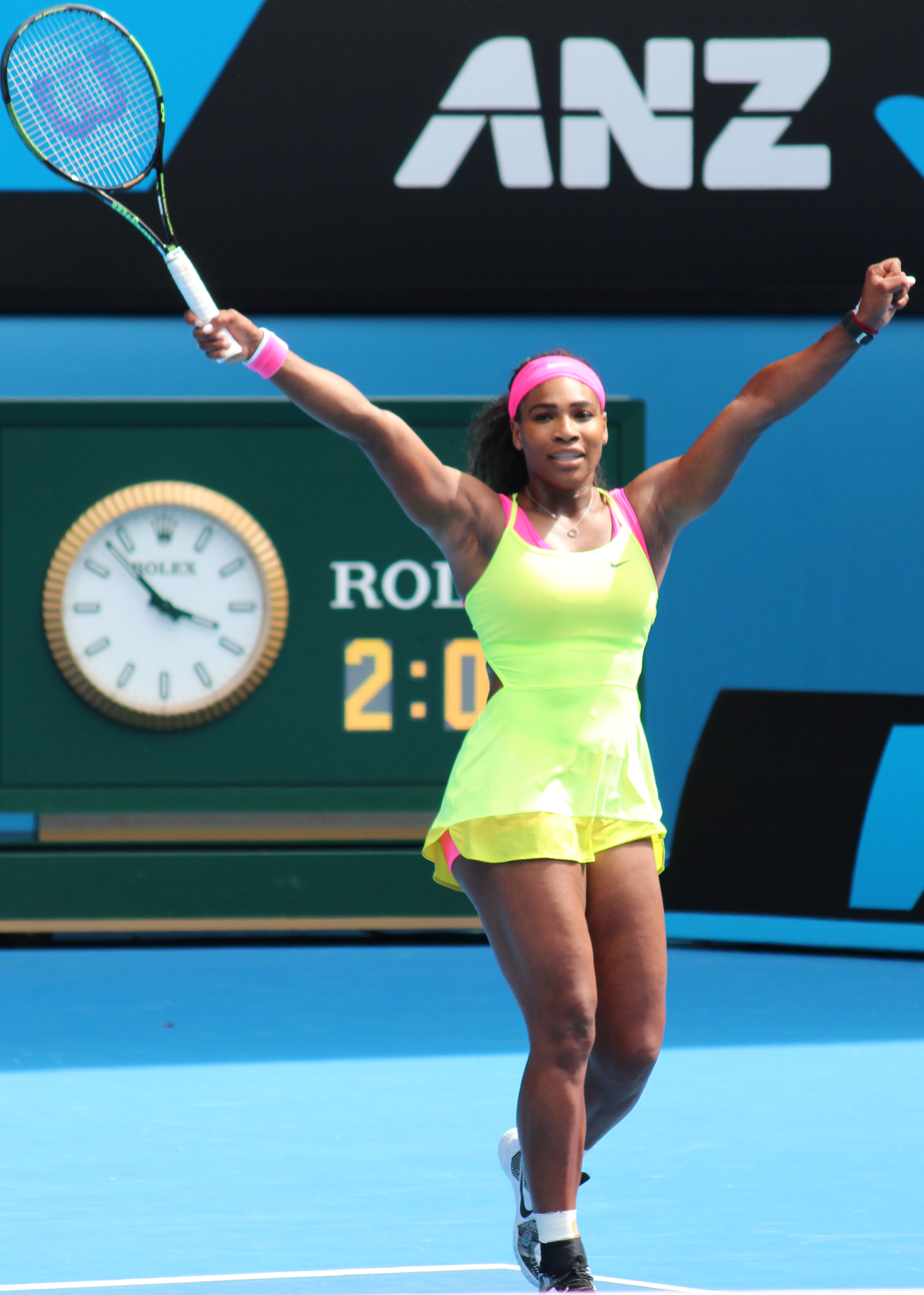
Williams at the 2015 Australian Open

== Performance timelines ==
Key
W	F	SF	QF	#R	RR	Q#	P#	DNQ	A	Z#	PO	G	S	B	NMS	NTI	P	NH

(W) winner; (F) finalist; (SF) semifinalist; (QF) quarterfinalist; (#R) rounds 4, 3, 2, 1; (RR) round-robin stage; (Q#) qualification round; (P#) preliminary round; (DNQ) did not qualify; (A) absent; (Z#) Davis/Fed Cup Zonal Group (with number indication) or (PO) play-off; (G) gold, (S) silver or (B) bronze Olympic/Paralympic medal; (NMS) not a Masters tournament; (NTI) not a Tier I tournament; (P) postponed; (NH) not held; (SR) strike rate (events won / competed); (W–L) win–loss record.
To avoid confusion and double counting, these charts are updated at the conclusion of a tournament or when the player's participation has ended.

=== Singles ===
Current through the 2026 WTA Tour.

Tournament	1995	1996	1997	1998	1999	2000	2001	2002	2003	2004	2005	2006	2007	2008	2009	2010	2011	2012	2013	2014	2015	2016	2017	2018	2019	2020	2021	2022	...	2026	SR	W–L	Win%
Grand Slam tournaments
Australian Open	A	A	A	2R	3R	4R	QF	A	W	A	W	3R	W	QF	W	W	A	4R	QF	4R	W	F	W	A	QF	3R	SF	A		A	7 / 20	92–13	88%
French Open	A	A	A	4R	3R	A	QF	W	SF	QF	A	A	QF	3R	QF	QF	A	1R	W	2R	W	F	A	4R	3R	2R	4R	A		A	3 / 19	69–14	83%
Wimbledon	A	A	A	3R	A	SF	QF	W	W	F	3R	A	QF	F	W	W	4R	W	4R	3R	W	W	A	F	F	NH	1R	1R		1R	7 / 22	98–15	87%
US Open	A	A	A	3R	W	QF	F	W	A	QF	4R	4R	QF	W	SF	A	F	W	W	W	SF	SF	A	F	F	SF	A	3R		A	6 / 21	108–15	88%
Win–loss	0–0	0–0	0–0	8–4	11–2	12–3	18–4	21–0	19–1	14–3	12–2	5–2	19–3	19–3	23–2	18–1	9–2	17–2	21–2	13–3	26–1	24–3	7–0	15–2	18–4	8–2	8–3	2–2		0–1	23 / 82	367–57	87%
Year-end championships
WTA Finals	did not qualify				A	A	W	F	A	F	DNQ		RR	RR	W	A	DNQ	W	W	W	A	A	DNQ			NH	DNQ				5 / 9	29–6	83%
Grand Slam Cup	men's only event			DNQ	W	not held																									1 / 1	3–0	100%
National representation
Summer Olympics	NH	A	not held			A	not held			A	not held			QF	not held			G	not held			3R	not held				A	not held			1 / 3	11–2	85%
Billie Jean King Cup	A	A	A	A	W	A	A	A	F	A	A	A	SF	A	A	A	A	PO	PO	A	PO	A	A	F	A	QR	A	A		A	1 / 4	14–1	93%
WTA 1000 / Premier Mandatory & Premier 5 / former Tier I tournaments
Dubai / Qatar Opens	not held						Tier III			Tier II				A	SF	A	A	A	F	A	A	A	A	A	A	A	A	A		A	0 / 2	7–2	78%
Indian Wells Open	TII	A	Q1	A	W	QF	W	absent (Note: Boycott of BNP Paribas Open by Venus and Serena Williams)													SF	F	A	3R	3R	NH	A	A		A	2 / 7	26–4	87%
Miami Open	A	A	A	QF	F	4R	QF	W	W	W	QF	A	W	W	F	A	A	QF	W	W	W	4R	A	1R	3R	NH	A	A		A	8 / 18	76–9	89%
Madrid Open	not held														1R	3R	A	W	W	QF	SF	A	A	A	A	NH	A	A		A	2 / 6	20–3	87%
Italian Open	A	A	A	QF	QF	A	A	W	SF	SF	2R	A	QF	QF	2R	SF	A	SF	W	W	3R	W	A	A	2R	A	2R	A		A	4 / 17	44–9	83%
Canadian Open	A	A	A	A	A	F	W	A	A	A	3R	A	A	A	SF	A	W	A	W	SF	SF	A	A	A	F	NH	A	2R		A	3 / 10	35–6	85%
Cincinnati Open	not held									Tier III					3R	A	2R	QF	F	W	W	A	A	2R	A	3R	A	1R		A	2 / 9	20–6	77%
Wuhan Open	not held																			2R	A	A	A	A	A	not held					0 / 1	0–1	0%
China Open	not held									Tier II					3R	A	A	A	W	QF	A	A	A	A	A	not held					1 / 3	11–1	92%
Charleston Open	A	A	A	A	A	A	A	QF	F	3R	A	A	1R	W	Premier / WTA 500																1 / 5	12–3	80%
German Open	A	A	A	A	QF	A	A	F	A	A	A	A	A	QF	not held												WTA 500				0 / 3	7–3	70%
San Diego Open	Tier II									QF	A	A	A	not held		Premier				not held											0 / 1	2–0	100%
Zurich Open	A	A	Q2	A	A	A	A	A	A	A	A	A	1R	TII	not held																0 / 1	0–1	0%
Kremlin Cup	NH	TIII	1R	A	A	A	A	A	A	A	A	A	F	A	Premier											NH	500	not held			0 / 2	3–2	60%
Win–loss	0–0	0–0	0–1	7–2	15–3	9–3	13–1	16–2	13–2	12–1	4–2	0–0	11–4	15–1	14–7	4–2	7–0	15–2	36–2	25–2	23–2	12–2	0–0	3–3	7–2	1–1	0–1	1–2		0–0	23 / 85	263–50	84%
Career statistics
	1995	1996	1997	1998	1999	2000	2001	2002	2003	2004	2005	2006	2007	2008	2009	2010	2011	2012	2013	2014	2015	2016	2017	2018	2019	2020	2021	2022	...	2026	SR	W–L	Win%
Tournaments	0	0	2	11	12	11	10	13	7	12	10	4	12	13	16	6	6	13	15	16	11	8	2	7	8	6	6	4		1	Career total: 241		
Titles	0	0	0	0	5	3	3	8	4	2	1	0	2	4	3	2	2	7	11	7	5	2	1	0	0	1	0	0		0	Career total: 73		
Finals	0	0	0	0	6	5	4	10	5	5	1	0	3	5	4	3	3	7	13	7	5	5	1	2	3	1	0	0		0	Career total: 98		
Hard win–loss	0–0	0–0	0–0	16–7	29–4	25–5	27–5	28–3	19–0	23–5	17–4	12–4	25–6	27–5	39–8	10–1	18–1	28–3	47–3	41–5	30–2	20–5	8–1	9–5	16–4	16–5	8–1	3–3		0–0	48 / 149	541–95	85%
Clay win–loss	0–0	0–0	0–0	6–2	7–3	0–1	4–1	17–2	12–3	10–3	2–2	0–0	6–3	11–2	4–4	8–3	0–0	17–1	28–0	9–2	16–1	11–1	0–0	3–0	3–1	1–0	4–3	0–0		0–0	13 / 60	179–38	82%
Grass win–loss	0–0	0–0	0–0	4–2	0–0	5–1	4–1	7–0	7–0	6–1	2–1	0–0	4–1	6–1	7–0	7–0	4–2	13–0	3–1	2–1	7–0	7–0	0–0	6–1	6–1	0–0	0–1	0–1		0–1	8 / 25	107–17	86%
Carpet win–loss	0–0	0–0	3–2	0–0	5–0	7–1	3–0	4–0	0–0	0–0	0–0	0–0	0–0	0–0	discontinued																4 / 7	22–3	88%
Overall win–loss	0–0	0–0	3–2	26–11	41–7	37–8	38–7	56–5	38–3	39–9	21–7	12–4	35–10	44–8	50–12	25–4	22–3	58–4	78–4	52–8	53–3	38–6	8–1	18–6	25–6	17–5	12–5	3–4		0–1	73 / 241	849–153	85%
Win %	–	–	60%	70%	85%	82%	84%	92%	93%	81%	75%	75%	78%	85%	81%	86%	88%	94%	95%	87%	95%	86%	89%	75%	81%	77%	71%	43%		0%	Career total: 85%		
Year-end ranking	–	–	99	20	4	6	6	1	3	7	11	95	7	2	1	4	12	3	1	1	1	2	22	16	10	11	41	– (Note: Serena ended as ranked number 321 upon retirement from the sport.)		1206	$94,825,705		

=== Doubles ===
Current through the 2026 WTA Tour.

Tournament	1997	1998	1999	2000	2001	2002	2003	2004	2005	2006	2007	2008	2009	2010	2011	2012	2013	2014	2015	2016	2017	2018	2019	2020	2021	2022	...	2026	SR	W–L	Win%
Grand Slam tournaments
Australian Open	A	3R	SF	A	W	A	W	A	A	A	A	QF	W	W	A	A	QF	A	A	A	A	A	A	A	A	A		A	4 / 8	36–4	90%
French Open	A	A	W	A	A	A	A	A	A	A	A	A	3R	W	A	A	1R	A	A	3R	A	3R	A	A	A	A		A	2 / 6	17–3	85%
Wimbledon	A	1R	A	W	3R	W	3R	A	A	A	2R	W	W	QF	A	W	A	2R	A	W	A	A	A	NH	A	A		A	6 / 12	45–3	94%
US Open	1R	A	W	SF	3R	A	A	A	A	A	A	A	W	A	A	3R	SF	QF	A	A	A	A	A	A	A	1R		1R	2 / 10	27–7	82%
Win–loss	0–1	2–1	16–1	10–0	10–1	6–0	8–1	0–0	0–0	0–0	1–0	9–1	20–1	14–1	0–0	8–1	7–2	4–2	0–0	8–1	0–0	2–1	0–0	0–0	0–0	0–1		0–1	14 / 36	125–17	88%
Year-end championship
WTA Finals	DNQ		A	did not qualify									SF	A	did not qualify									NH	did not qualify				0 / 1	0–1	0%
National representation
Olympics	not held			G	not held			A	not held			G	not held			G	not held			1R	not held				A	not held			3 / 4	15–1	94%
Billie Jean King Cup	A	A	W	A	A	A	F	A	A	A	SF	A	A	A	A	PO	PO	A	PO	A	A	F	A	QR	A	A		A	1 / 4	3–2	60%
WTA 1000 / Premier Mandatory & Premier 5 / former Tier I tournaments
Indian Wells Open	QF	QF	SF	A	A	A													A	A	A	A	A	NH	A	A		A	0 / 3	7–3	70%
Miami Open	A	1R	3R	A	A	A	A	A	A	A	A	A	A	A	A	A	A	A	A	A	A	A	A	NH	A	A		A	0 / 2	1–1	50%
Madrid Open	not held												A	W	A	A	A	A	A	A	A	A	A	NH	A	A		A	1 / 1	4–0	100%
Italian Open	A	SF	A	A	A	A	A	A	A	A	A	A	A	A	A	A	A	A	A	1R	A	A	A	A	A	A		A	0 / 2	3–2	60%
Cincinnati Open	not held / not Tier I												A	A	A	A	A	A	A	A	A	A	A	A	A	A		1R	0 / 1	0–1	0%
China Open	not held / not Tier I												A	A	A	A	1R	A	A	A	A	A	A	not held				A	0 / 1	0–1	0%
Zurich Open	Q3	W	A	A	A	A	A	A	A	A	A	not held / not Tier I																	1 / 1	4–0	100%
Kremlin Cup	A	QF	A	A	A	A	A	A	A	A	A	not held / not Tier I																	0 / 1	1–0	100%
Win–loss	2–1	10–3	4–1	0–0	0–0	0–0	0–0	0–0	0–0	0–0	0–0	0–0	0–0	4–0	0–0	0–0	0–1	0–0	0–0	0–1	0–0	0–0	0–0	0–0	0–0	0–0		0–1	2 / 12	20–8	71%
Career statistics
	1997	1998	1999	2000	2001	2002	2003	2004	2005	2006	2007	2008	2009	2010	2011	2012	2013	2014	2015	2016	2017	2018	2019	2020	2021	2022	...	2026	SR	W–L	Win%
Tournaments	3	9	8	3	4	3	2	0	0	0	1	5	6	4	0	3	4	3	0	4	0	1	0	1	0	2		4	Career total: 70		
Titles	0	2	3	2	1	2	1	0	0	0	0	2	4	3	0	2	0	0	0	1	0	0	0	0	0	0		0	Career total: 23		
Finals	0	2	4	2	1	2	1	0	0	0	0	2	4	3	0	2	0	0	0	1	0	0	0	1	0	0		0	Career total: 25		
Overall win–loss	4–2	16–5	29–4	15–0	10–2	11–1	9–1	0–0	0–0	0–0	1–0	16–2	24–2	18–1	0–0	13–1	7–3	4–3	0–1	8–3	0–0	2–2	0–0	3–1	0–0	2–1		1–3	23 / 70	193–38	84%
Year-end ranking	121	36	10	54	54	25	–	–	–	–	–	28	3	11	–	31	63	133	–	31	–	292	–	397	431	–		512	Career total: 84%		

=== Mixed doubles ===
Tournament	1998	1999	...	2012	...	2019	...	2026	SR	W–L	Win%
Grand Slam tournaments
Australian Open	1R	F		A		A		A	0 / 2	4–2	67%
French Open	F	A		1R		A		A	0 / 2	5–2	71%
Wimbledon	W	A		A		3R		A	1 / 2	8–1	89%
US Open	W	A		A		A		QF	1 / 2	5–1	83%
Win–loss	15–2	4–1		0–1		2–1		1–1	2 / 8	22–6	79%

== Grand Slam tournament finals ==
=== Singles: 33 (23 titles, 10 runner-ups) ===
Williams has won an Open Era record 23 Grand Slam singles titles. To win those titles, she has beaten 12 different players who have been ranked No. 1, including her sister, Venus Williams, seven times. She is also one of only two players in the Open Era to have won each major three or more times.

Result	Year	Championship	Surface	Opponent	Score
Win	1999	US Open	Hard	(Switzerland) Martina Hingis	6–3, 7–6^{(7–4)}
Loss	2001	US Open	Hard	(United States) Venus Williams	2–6, 4–6
Win	2002	French Open	Clay	(United States) Venus Williams	7–5, 6–3
Win	2002	Wimbledon	Grass	(United States) Venus Williams	7–6^{(7–4)}, 6–3
Win	2002	US Open (2)	Hard	(United States) Venus Williams	6–4, 6–3
Win	2003	Australian Open	Hard	(United States) Venus Williams	7–6^{(7–4)}, 3–6, 6–4
Win	2003	Wimbledon (2)	Grass	(United States) Venus Williams	4–6, 6–4, 6–2
Loss	2004	Wimbledon	Grass	(Russia) Maria Sharapova	1–6, 4–6
Win	2005	Australian Open (2)	Hard	(United States) Lindsay Davenport	2–6, 6–3, 6–0
Win	2007	Australian Open (3)	Hard	(Russia) Maria Sharapova	6–1, 6–2
Loss	2008	Wimbledon	Grass	(United States) Venus Williams	5–7, 4–6
Win	2008	US Open (3)	Hard	(Serbia) Jelena Janković	6–4, 7–5
Win	2009	Australian Open (4)	Hard	(Russia) Dinara Safina	6–0, 6–3
Win	2009	Wimbledon (3)	Grass	(United States) Venus Williams	7–6^{(7–3)}, 6–2
Win	2010	Australian Open (5)	Hard	(Belgium) Justine Henin	6–4, 3–6, 6–2
Win	2010	Wimbledon (4)	Grass	(Russia) Vera Zvonareva	6–3, 6–2
Loss	2011	US Open	Hard	(Australia) Samantha Stosur	2–6, 3–6
Win	2012	Wimbledon (5)	Grass	(Poland) Agnieszka Radwańska	6–1, 5–7, 6–2
Win	2012	US Open (4)	Hard	(Belarus) Victoria Azarenka	6–2, 2–6, 7–5
Win	2013	French Open (2)	Clay	(Russia) Maria Sharapova	6–4, 6–4
Win	2013	US Open (5)	Hard	(Belarus) Victoria Azarenka	7–5, 6–7^{(6–8)}, 6–1
Win	2014	US Open (6)	Hard	(Denmark) Caroline Wozniacki	6–3, 6–3
Win	2015	Australian Open (6)	Hard	(Russia) Maria Sharapova	6–3, 7–6^{(7–5)}
Win	2015	French Open (3)	Clay	(Czech Republic) Lucie Šafářová	6–3, 6–7^{(2–7)}, 6–2
Win	2015	Wimbledon (6)	Grass	(Spain) Garbiñe Muguruza	6–4, 6–4
Loss	2016	Australian Open	Hard	(Germany) Angelique Kerber	4–6, 6–3, 4–6
Loss	2016	French Open	Clay	(Spain) Garbiñe Muguruza	5–7, 4–6
Win	2016	Wimbledon (7)	Grass	(Germany) Angelique Kerber	7–5, 6–3
Win	2017	Australian Open (7)	Hard	(United States) Venus Williams	6–4, 6–4
Loss	2018	Wimbledon	Grass	(Germany) Angelique Kerber	3–6, 3–6
Loss	2018	US Open	Hard	(Japan) Naomi Osaka	2–6, 4–6
Loss	2019	Wimbledon	Grass	(Romania) Simona Halep	2–6, 2–6
Loss	2019	US Open	Hard	(Canada) Bianca Andreescu	3–6, 5–7

=== Women's doubles: 14 (14–0) ===
Result	Year	Championship	Surface	Partner	Opponents	Score
Win	1999	French Open	Clay	(United States) Venus Williams	(Switzerland) Martina Hingis (Russia) Anna Kournikova	6–3, 6–7^{(2–7)}, 8–6
Win	1999	US Open	Hard	(United States) Venus Williams	(United States) Chanda Rubin (France) Sandrine Testud	4–6, 6–1, 6–4
Win	2000	Wimbledon	Grass	(United States) Venus Williams	(France) Julie Halard-Decugis (Japan) Ai Sugiyama	6–3, 6–2
Win	2001	Australian Open	Hard	(United States) Venus Williams	(United States) Lindsay Davenport (United States) Corina Morariu	6–2, 2–6, 6–4
Win	2002	Wimbledon (2)	Grass	(United States) Venus Williams	(Spain) Virginia Ruano Pascual (Argentina) Paola Suárez	6–2, 7–5
Win	2003	Australian Open (2)	Hard	(United States) Venus Williams	(Spain) Virginia Ruano Pascual (Argentina) Paola Suárez	4–6, 6–4, 6–3
Win	2008	Wimbledon (3)	Grass	(United States) Venus Williams	(United States) Lisa Raymond (Australia) Samantha Stosur	6–2, 6–2
Win	2009	Australian Open (3)	Hard	(United States) Venus Williams	(Slovakia) Daniela Hantuchová (Japan) Ai Sugiyama	6–3, 6–3
Win	2009	Wimbledon (4)	Grass	(United States) Venus Williams	(Australia) Samantha Stosur (Australia) Rennae Stubbs	7–6^{(7–4)}, 6–4
Win	2009	US Open (2)	Hard	(United States) Venus Williams	(Zimbabwe) Cara Black (United States) Liezel Huber	6–2, 6–2
Win	2010	Australian Open (4)	Hard	(United States) Venus Williams	(Zimbabwe) Cara Black (United States) Liezel Huber	6–4, 6–3
Win	2010	French Open (2)	Clay	(United States) Venus Williams	(Czech Republic) Květa Peschke (Slovenia) Katarina Srebotnik	6–2, 6–3
Win	2012	Wimbledon (5)	Grass	(United States) Venus Williams	(Czech Republic) Andrea Hlaváčková (Czech Republic) Lucie Hradecká	7–5, 6–4
Win	2016	Wimbledon (6)	Grass	(United States) Venus Williams	(Hungary) Tímea Babos (Kazakhstan) Yaroslava Shvedova	6–3, 6–4

=== Mixed doubles: 4 (2–2) ===
Result	Year	Championship	Surface	Partner	Opponents	Score
Loss	1998	French Open	Clay	(Argentina) Luis Lobo	(United States) Justin Gimelstob (United States) Venus Williams	4–6, 4–6
Win	1998	Wimbledon	Grass	(Belarus) Max Mirnyi	(India) Mahesh Bhupathi (Croatia) Mirjana Lučić	6–4, 6–4
Win	1998	US Open	Hard	(Belarus) Max Mirnyi	(United States) Patrick Galbraith (United States) Lisa Raymond	6–2, 6–2
Loss	1999	Australian Open	Hard	(Belarus) Max Mirnyi	(South Africa) David Adams (South Africa) Mariaan de Swardt	4–6, 6–4, 6–7^{(5–7)}

== Other significant finals ==
=== Olympic finals ===
==== Singles: 1 (1 gold medal) ====
Result	Year	Tournament	Surface	Opponent	Score
Gold	2012	London Olympics	Grass	(Russia) Maria Sharapova	6–0, 6–1

==== Doubles: 3 (3 gold medals) ====
Result	Year	Tournament	Surface	Partner	Opponents	Score
Gold	2000	Sydney Olympics	Hard	(United States) Venus Williams	(Netherlands) Kristie Boogert (Netherlands) Miriam Oremans	6–1, 6–1
Gold	2008	Beijing Olympics (2)	Hard	(United States) Venus Williams	(Spain) Anabel Medina Garrigues (Spain) Virginia Ruano Pascual	6–2, 6–0
Gold	2012	London Olympics (3)	Grass	(United States) Venus Williams	(Czech Republic) Andrea Hlaváčková (Czech Republic) Lucie Hradecká	6–4, 6–4

=== Year-end championships finals ===
==== Singles: 7 (5 titles, 2 runner-ups) ====
Result	Year	Championship	Surface	Opponent	Score
Win	2001	WTA Finals, Munich	Carpet (i)	(United States) Lindsay Davenport	w/o
Loss	2002	WTA Finals, Los Angeles	Hard (i)	(Belgium) Kim Clijsters	5–7, 3–6
Loss	2004	WTA Finals, Los Angeles	Hard (i)	(Russia) Maria Sharapova	6–4, 2–6, 4–6
Win	2009	WTA Finals, Doha (2)	Hard	(United States) Venus Williams	6–2, 7–6^{(7–4)}
Win	2012	WTA Finals, Istanbul (3)	Hard (i)	(Russia) Maria Sharapova	6–4, 6–3
Win	2013	WTA Finals, Istanbul (4)	Hard (i)	(China) Li Na	2–6, 6–3, 6–0
Win	2014	WTA Finals, Singapore (5)	Hard (i)	(Romania) Simona Halep	6–3, 6–0

=== Tier I / Premier Mandatory & Premier 5 finals ===
==== Singles: 33 finals (23 titles, 10 runner-ups) ====
Result	Year	Tournament	Surface	Opponent	Score
Win	1999	Indian Wells Open	Hard	(Germany) Steffi Graf	6–3, 3–6, 7–5
Loss	1999	Miami Open	Hard	(United States) Venus Williams	1–6, 6–4, 4–6
Loss	2000	Canadian Open	Hard	(Switzerland) Martina Hingis	6–0, 3–6, 0–3 ret.
Win	2001	Indian Wells Open (2)	Hard	(Belgium) Kim Clijsters	4–6, 6–4, 6–2
Win	2001	Canadian Open	Hard	(United States) Jennifer Capriati	6–1, 6–7^{(7–9)}, 6–3
Win	2002	Miami Open	Hard	(United States) Jennifer Capriati	7–5, 7–6^{(7–4)}
Loss	2002	German Open	Clay	(Belgium) Justine Henin	2–6, 6–1, 6–7^{(5–7)}
Win	2002	Italian Open	Clay	(Belgium) Justine Henin	7–6^{(8–6)}, 6–4
Win	2003	Miami Open (2)	Hard	(United States) Jennifer Capriati	4–6, 6–4, 6–1
Loss	2003	Charleston Open	Clay	(Belgium) Justine Henin	3–6, 4–6
Win	2004	Miami Open (3)	Hard	(Russia) Elena Dementieva	6–1, 6–1
Win	2007	Miami Open (4)	Hard	(Belgium) Justine Henin	0–6, 7–5, 6–3
Loss	2007	Kremlin Cup	Hard (i)	(Russia) Elena Dementieva	7–5, 1–6, 1–6
Win	2008	Miami Open (5)	Hard	(Serbia) Jelena Janković	6–1, 5–7, 6–3
Win	2008	Charleston Open	Clay	(Russia) Vera Zvonareva	6–4, 3–6, 6–3
Loss	2009	Miami Open (2)	Hard	(Belarus) Victoria Azarenka	3–6, 1–6
Win	2011	Canadian Open (2)	Hard	(Australia) Samantha Stosur	6–4, 6–2
Win	2012	Madrid Open	Clay	(Belarus) Victoria Azarenka	6–1, 6–3
Loss	2013	Qatar Open	Hard	(Belarus) Victoria Azarenka	6–7^{(6–8)}, 6–2, 3–6
Win	2013	Miami Open (6)	Hard	(Russia) Maria Sharapova	4–6, 6–3, 6–0
Win	2013	Madrid Open (2)	Clay	(Russia) Maria Sharapova	6–1, 6–4
Win	2013	Italian Open (2)	Clay	(Belarus) Victoria Azarenka	6–1, 6–3
Win	2013	Canadian Open (3)	Hard	(Romania) Sorana Cîrstea	6–2, 6–0
Loss	2013	Cincinnati Open	Hard	(Belarus) Victoria Azarenka	6–2, 2–6, 6–7^{(6–8)}
Win	2013	China Open	Hard	(Serbia) Jelena Janković	6–2, 6–2
Win	2014	Miami Open (7)	Hard	(China) Li Na	7–5, 6–1
Win	2014	Italian Open (3)	Clay	(Italy) Sara Errani	6–3, 6–0
Win	2014	Cincinnati Open	Hard	(Serbia) Ana Ivanovic	6–4, 6–1
Win	2015	Miami Open (8)	Hard	(Spain) Carla Suárez Navarro	6–2, 6–0
Win	2015	Cincinnati Open (2)	Hard	(Romania) Simona Halep	6–3, 7–6^{(7–5)}
Loss	2016	Indian Wells Open	Hard	(Belarus) Victoria Azarenka	4–6, 4–6
Win	2016	Italian Open (4)	Clay	(United States) Madison Keys	7–6^{(7–5)}, 6–3
Loss	2019	Canadian Open	Hard	(Canada) Bianca Andreescu	1–3 ret.

==== Doubles: 2 finals (2 titles) ====
Result	Year	Tournament	Surface	Partner	Opponents	Score
Win	1998	Zurich Open	Carpet (i)	(United States) Venus Williams	(South Africa) Mariaan de Swardt (Ukraine) Elena Tatarkova	5–7, 6–1, 6–3
Win	2010	Madrid Open	Clay	(United States) Venus Williams	(Argentina) Gisela Dulko (Italy) Flavia Pennetta	6–2, 7–5

== WTA career finals ==
=== Singles: 98 (73 titles, 25 runner-ups) ===
Legend (pre/post 2009, pre/post 2021) Grand Slam tournaments (23–10) WTA Tour Finals (5–2) Olympic Games (1–0) Grand Slam Cup (1–0) Tier I / Premier Mandatory & Premier 5 / WTA 1000 (23–10) Tier II / Premier / WTA 500 (18–3) Tier III, IV & V / International / WTA 250 (2–0)	Finals by surface Hard (48–17) Grass (8–4) Clay (13–3) Carpet (4–1)	Finals by setting Outdoor (64–21) Indoor (9–4)

Result	W–L	Date	Tournament	Tier	Surface	Opponent	Score
Win	1–0	Feb 1999	Open GDF Suez, France	Tier II	Carpet (i)	(France) Amélie Mauresmo	6–2, 3–6, 7–6^{(7–4)}
Win	2–0	Mar 1999	Indian Wells Open, United States	Tier I	Hard	(Germany) Steffi Graf	6–3, 3–6, 7–5
Loss	2–1	Mar 1999	Miami Open, United States	Tier I	Hard	(United States) Venus Williams	1–6, 6–4, 4–6
Win	3–1	Aug 1999	LA Championships, United States	Tier II	Hard	(France) Julie Halard-Decugis	6–1, 6–4
Win	4–1	Sep 1999	US Open, United States	Grand Slam	Hard	(Switzerland) Martina Hingis	6–3, 7–6^{(7–4)}
Win	5–1	Oct 1999	Grand Slam Cup, Germany	GS Cup	Hard (i)	(United States) Venus Williams	6–1, 3–6, 6–3
Loss	5–2	Feb 2000	Open GDF Suez, France	Tier II	Carpet (i)	(France) Nathalie Tauziat	5–7, 2–6
Win	6–2	Feb 2000	Faber Grand Prix, Germany	Tier II	Carpet (i)	(Czech Republic) Denisa Chládková	6–1, 6–1
Win	7–2	Aug 2000	LA Championships, United States (2)	Tier II	Hard	(United States) Lindsay Davenport	4–6, 6–4, 7–6^{(7–1)}
Loss	7–3	Aug 2000	Canadian Open, Canada	Tier I	Hard	(Switzerland) Martina Hingis	6–0, 3–6, 0–3 ret.
Win	8–3	Oct 2000	Toyota Princess Cup, Japan	Tier II	Hard	(France) Julie Halard-Decugis	7–5, 6–1
Win	9–3	Mar 2001	Indian Wells Open, United States (2)	Tier I	Hard	(Belgium) Kim Clijsters	4–6, 6–4, 6–2
Win	10–3	Aug 2001	Canadian Open, Canada	Tier I	Hard	(United States) Jennifer Capriati	6–1, 6–7^{(7–9)}, 6–3
Loss	10–4	Sep 2001	US Open, United States	Grand Slam	Hard	(United States) Venus Williams	2–6, 4–6
Win	11–4	Nov 2001	WTA Finals, Germany	Tour Finals	Hard (i)	(United States) Lindsay Davenport	Walkover
Win	12–4	Mar 2002	State Farm Classic, United States	Tier II	Hard	(United States) Jennifer Capriati	6–2, 4–6, 6–4
Win	13–4	Apr 2002	Miami Open, United States	Tier I	Hard	(United States) Jennifer Capriati	7–5, 7–6^{(7–4)}
Loss	13–5	May 2002	German Open, Germany	Tier I	Clay	(Belgium) Justine Henin	2–6, 6–1, 6–7^{(5–7)}
Win	14–5	May 2002	Italian Open, Italy	Tier I	Clay	(Belgium) Justine Henin	7–6^{(8–6)}, 6–4
Win	15–5	Jun 2002	French Open, France	Grand Slam	Clay	(United States) Venus Williams	7–5, 6–3
Win	16–5	Jul 2002	Wimbledon, United Kingdom	Grand Slam	Grass	(United States) Venus Williams	7–6^{(7–4)}, 6–3
Win	17–5	Sep 2002	US Open, United States (2)	Grand Slam	Hard	(United States) Venus Williams	6–4, 6–3
Win	18–5	Sep 2002	Toyota Princess Cup, Japan (2)	Tier II	Hard	(Belgium) Kim Clijsters	2–6, 6–3, 6–3
Win	19–5	Sep 2002	Sparkassen Cup, Germany	Tier II	Carpet (i)	(Russia) Anastasia Myskina	6–3, 6–2
Loss	19–6	Nov 2002	WTA Finals, United States	Tour Finals	Hard (i)	(Belgium) Kim Clijsters	5–7, 3–6
Win	20–6	Jan 2003	Australian Open, Australia	Grand Slam	Hard	(United States) Venus Williams	7–6^{(7–4)}, 3–6, 6–4
Win	21–6	Feb 2003	Open GDF Suez, France (2)	Tier II	Hard (i)	(France) Amélie Mauresmo	6–3, 6–2
Win	22–6	Mar 2003	Miami Open, United States (2)	Tier I	Hard	(United States) Jennifer Capriati	4–6, 6–4, 6–1
Loss	22–7	Apr 2003	Charleston Open, United States	Tier I	Clay (green)	(Belgium) Justine Henin	3–6, 4–6
Win	23–7	Jul 2003	Wimbledon, United Kingdom (2)	Grand Slam	Grass	(United States) Venus Williams	4–6, 6–4, 6–2
Win	24–7	Apr 2004	Miami Open, United States (3)	Tier I	Hard	(Russia) Elena Dementieva	6–1, 6–1
Loss	24–8	Jun 2004	Wimbledon, United Kingdom	Grand Slam	Grass	(Russia) Maria Sharapova	1–6, 4–6
Loss	24–9	Jul 2004	LA Championships, United States	Tier II	Hard	(United States) Lindsay Davenport	1–6, 3–6
Win	25–9	Sep 2004	China Open, China	Tier II	Hard	(Russia) Svetlana Kuznetsova	4–6, 7–5, 6–4
Loss	25–10	Nov 2004	WTA Finals, United States	Tour Finals	Hard (i)	(Russia) Maria Sharapova	6–4, 2–6, 4–6
Win	26–10	Jan 2005	Australian Open, Australia (2)	Grand Slam	Hard	(United States) Lindsay Davenport	2–6, 6–3, 6–0
Win	27–10	Jan 2007	Australian Open, Australia (3)	Grand Slam	Hard	(Russia) Maria Sharapova	6–1, 6–2
Win	28–10	Mar 2007	Miami Open, United States (4)	Tier I	Hard	(Belgium) Justine Henin	0–6, 7–5, 6–3
Loss	28–11	Oct 2007	Kremlin Cup, Russia	Tier I	Hard (i)	(Russia) Elena Dementieva	7–5, 1–6, 1–6
Win	29–11	Mar 2008	Bangalore Open, India	Tier II	Hard	(Switzerland) Patty Schnyder	7–5, 6–3
Win	30–11	Apr 2008	Miami Open, United States (5)	Tier I	Hard	(Serbia) Jelena Janković	6–1, 5–7, 6–3
Win	31–11	Apr 2008	Charleston Open, United States	Tier I	Clay (green)	(Russia) Vera Zvonareva	6–4, 3–6, 6–3
Loss	31–12	Jul 2008	Wimbledon, United Kingdom	Grand Slam	Grass	(United States) Venus Williams	5–7, 4–6
Win	32–12	Sep 2008	US Open, United States (3)	Grand Slam	Hard	(Serbia) Jelena Janković	6–4, 7–5
Win	33–12	Jan 2009	Australian Open, Australia (4)	Grand Slam	Hard	(Russia) Dinara Safina	6–0, 6–3
Loss	33–13	Apr 2009	Miami Open, United States	Premier M	Hard	(Belarus) Victoria Azarenka	3–6, 1–6
Win	34–13	Jul 2009	Wimbledon, United Kingdom (3)	Grand Slam	Grass	(United States) Venus Williams	7–6^{(7–3)}, 6–2
Win	35–13	Nov 2009	WTA Finals, Qatar (2)	Tour Finals	Hard	(United States) Venus Williams	6–2, 7–6^{(7–4)}
Loss	35–14	Jan 2010	Sydney International, Australia	Premier	Hard	(Russia) Elena Dementieva	3–6, 2–6
Win	36–14	Jan 2010	Australian Open, Australia (5)	Grand Slam	Hard	(Belgium) Justine Henin	6–4, 3–6, 6–2
Win	37–14	Jul 2010	Wimbledon, United Kingdom (4)	Grand Slam	Grass	(Russia) Vera Zvonareva	6–3, 6–2
Win	38–14	Jul 2011	Stanford Classic, United States	Premier	Hard	(France) Marion Bartoli	7–5, 6–1
Win	39–14	Aug 2011	Canadian Open, Canada (2)	Premier 5	Hard	(Australia) Samantha Stosur	6–4, 6–2
Loss	39–15	Sep 2011	US Open, United States	Grand Slam	Hard	(Australia) Samantha Stosur	2–6, 3–6
Win	40–15	Apr 2012	Charleston Open, United States (2)	Premier	Clay (green)	(Czech Republic) Lucie Šafářová	6–0, 6–1
Win	41–15	May 2012	Madrid Open, Spain	Premier M	Clay (blue)	(Belarus) Victoria Azarenka	6–1, 6–3
Win	42–15	Jul 2012	Wimbledon, United Kingdom (5)	Grand Slam	Grass	(Poland) Agnieszka Radwańska	6–1, 5–7, 6–2
Win	43–15	Jul 2012	Stanford Classic, United States (2)	Premier	Hard	(United States) CoCo Vandeweghe	7–5, 6–3
Win	44–15	Aug 2012	Summer Olympics, United Kingdom	Olympics	Grass	(Russia) Maria Sharapova	6–0, 6–1
Win	45–15	Sep 2012	US Open, United States (4)	Grand Slam	Hard	(Belarus) Victoria Azarenka	6–2, 2–6, 7–5
Win	46–15	Oct 2012	WTA Finals, Turkey (3)	Tour Finals	Hard (i)	(Russia) Maria Sharapova	6–4, 6–3
Win	47–15	Jan 2013	Brisbane International, Australia	Premier	Hard	(Russia) Anastasia Pavlyuchenkova	6–2, 6–1
Loss	47–16	Feb 2013	Qatar Open, Qatar	Premier 5	Hard	(Belarus) Victoria Azarenka	6–7^{(6–8)}, 6–2, 3–6
Win	48–16	Mar 2013	Miami Open, United States (6)	Premier M	Hard	(Russia) Maria Sharapova	4–6, 6–3, 6–0
Win	49–16	Apr 2013	Charleston Open, United States (3)	Premier	Clay (green)	(Serbia) Jelena Janković	3–6, 6–0, 6–2
Win	50–16	May 2013	Madrid Open, Spain (2)	Premier M	Clay	(Russia) Maria Sharapova	6–1, 6–4
Win	51–16	May 2013	Italian Open, Italy (2)	Premier 5	Clay	(Belarus) Victoria Azarenka	6–1, 6–3
Win	52–16	Jun 2013	French Open, France (2)	Grand Slam	Clay	(Russia) Maria Sharapova	6–4, 6–4
Win	53–16	Jul 2013	Swedish Open, Sweden	International	Clay	(Sweden) Johanna Larsson	6–4, 6–1
Win	54–16	Aug 2013	Canadian Open, Canada (3)	Premier 5	Hard	(Romania) Sorana Cîrstea	6–2, 6–0
Loss	54–17	Aug 2013	Cincinnati Open, United States	Premier 5	Hard	(Belarus) Victoria Azarenka	6–2, 2–6, 6–7^{(6–8)}
Win	55–17	Sep 2013	US Open, United States (5)	Grand Slam	Hard	(Belarus) Victoria Azarenka	7–5, 6–7^{(6–8)}, 6–1
Win	56–17	Oct 2013	China Open, China (2)	Premier M	Hard	(Serbia) Jelena Janković	6–2, 6–2
Win	57–17	Oct 2013	WTA Finals, Turkey (4)	Tour Finals	Hard (i)	(China) Li Na	2–6, 6–3, 6–0
Win	58–17	Jan 2014	Brisbane International, Australia (2)	Premier	Hard	(Belarus) Victoria Azarenka	6–4, 7–5
Win	59–17	Mar 2014	Miami Open, United States (7)	Premier M	Hard	(China) Li Na	7–5, 6–1
Win	60–17	May 2014	Italian Open, Italy (3)	Premier 5	Clay	(Italy) Sara Errani	6–3, 6–0
Win	61–17	Aug 2014	Stanford Classic, United States (3)	Premier	Hard	(Germany) Angelique Kerber	7–6^{(7–1)}, 6–3
Win	62–17	Aug 2014	Cincinnati Open, United States	Premier 5	Hard	(Serbia) Ana Ivanovic	6–4, 6–1
Win	63–17	Sep 2014	US Open, United States (6)	Grand Slam	Hard	(Denmark) Caroline Wozniacki	6–3, 6–3
Win	64–17	Oct 2014	WTA Finals, Singapore (5)	Tour Finals	Hard (i)	(Romania) Simona Halep	6–3, 6–0
Win	65–17	Jan 2015	Australian Open, Australia (6)	Grand Slam	Hard	(Russia) Maria Sharapova	6–3, 7–6^{(7–5)}
Win	66–17	Apr 2015	Miami Open, United States (8)	Premier M	Hard	(Spain) Carla Suárez Navarro	6–2, 6–0
Win	67–17	Jun 2015	French Open, France (3)	Grand Slam	Clay	(Czech Republic) Lucie Šafářová	6–3, 6–7^{(2–7)}, 6–2
Win	68–17	Jul 2015	Wimbledon, United Kingdom (6)	Grand Slam	Grass	(Spain) Garbiñe Muguruza	6–4, 6–4
Win	69–17	Aug 2015	Cincinnati Open, United States (2)	Premier 5	Hard	(Romania) Simona Halep	6–3, 7–6^{(7–5)}
Loss	69–18	Jan 2016	Australian Open, Australia	Grand Slam	Hard	(Germany) Angelique Kerber	4–6, 6–3, 4–6
Loss	69–19	Mar 2016	Indian Wells Open, United States	Premier M	Hard	(Belarus) Victoria Azarenka	4–6, 4–6
Win	70–19	May 2016	Italian Open, Italy (4)	Premier 5	Clay	(United States) Madison Keys	7–6^{(7–5)}, 6–3
Loss	70–20	Jun 2016	French Open, France	Grand Slam	Clay	(Spain) Garbiñe Muguruza	5–7, 4–6
Win	71–20	Jul 2016	Wimbledon, United Kingdom (7)	Grand Slam	Grass	(Germany) Angelique Kerber	7–5, 6–3
Win	72–20	Jan 2017	Australian Open, Australia (7)	Grand Slam	Hard	(United States) Venus Williams	6–4, 6–4
Loss	72–21	Jul 2018	Wimbledon, United Kingdom	Grand Slam	Grass	(Germany) Angelique Kerber	3–6, 3–6
Loss	72–22	Sep 2018	US Open, United States	Grand Slam	Hard	(Japan) Naomi Osaka	2–6, 4–6
Loss	72–23	Jul 2019	Wimbledon, United Kingdom	Grand Slam	Grass	(Romania) Simona Halep	2–6, 2–6
Loss	72–24	Aug 2019	Canadian Open, Canada	Premier 5	Hard	(Canada) Bianca Andreescu	1–3 ret.
Loss	72–25	Sep 2019	US Open, United States	Grand Slam	Hard	(Canada) Bianca Andreescu	3–6, 5–7
Win	73–25	Jan 2020	Auckland Open, New Zealand	International	Hard	(United States) Jessica Pegula	6–3, 6–4

=== Doubles: 25 (23 titles, 2 runner-up) ===
Legend (pre/post 2009) Grand Slam tournaments (14–0) WTA Tour Finals (0–0) Olympic Games (3–0) Tier I / Premier Mandatory & Premier 5 (2–0) Tier II / Premier (3–1) Tier III, IV & V / International (1–1)	Finals by surface Hard (10–2) Grass (7–0) Clay (3–0) Carpet (3–0)	Finals by setting Outdoor (19–2) Indoor (4–0)

Result	W–L	Date	Tournament	Tier	Surface	Partner	Opponents	Score
Win	1–0	Feb 1998	US National Championships, United States	Tier III	Hard (i)	(United States) Venus Williams	(Romania) Cătălina Cristea (Australia) Kristine Kunce	7–5, 6–2
Win	2–0	Oct 1998	Zurich Open, Switzerland	Tier I	Carpet (i)	(United States) Venus Williams	(South Africa) Mariaan de Swardt (Ukraine) Elena Tatarkova	5–7, 6–1, 6–3
Win	3–0	Feb 1999	Faber Grand Prix, Germany	Tier II	Carpet (i)	(United States) Venus Williams	(France) Alexandra Fusai (France) Nathalie Tauziat	5–7, 6–2, 6–2
Win	4–0	May 1999	French Open, France	Grand Slam	Clay	(United States) Venus Williams	(Switzerland) Martina Hingis (Russia) Anna Kournikova	6–3, 6–7^{(2–7)}, 8–6
Loss	4–1	Aug 1999	Southern California Open, United States	Tier II	Hard	(United States) Venus Williams	(United States) Lindsay Davenport (United States) Corina Morariu	4–6, 1–6
Win	5–1	Aug 1999	US Open, United States	Grand Slam	Hard	(United States) Venus Williams	(United States) Chanda Rubin (France) Sandrine Testud	4–6, 6–1, 6–4
Win	6–1	Jun 2000	Wimbledon, United Kingdom	Grand Slam	Grass	(United States) Venus Williams	(France) Julie Halard-Decugis (Japan) Ai Sugiyama	6–3, 6–2
Win	7–1	Sep 2000	Summer Olympics, Australia	Olympics	Hard	(United States) Venus Williams	(Netherlands) Kristie Boogert (Netherlands) Miriam Oremans	6–1, 6–1
Win	8–1	Jan 2001	Australian Open, Australia	Grand Slam	Hard	(United States) Venus Williams	(United States) Lindsay Davenport (United States) Corina Morariu	6–2, 4–6, 6–4
Win	9–1	Jun 2002	Wimbledon, United Kingdom (2)	Grand Slam	Grass	(United States) Venus Williams	(Spain) Virginia Ruano Pascual (Argentina) Paola Suárez	6–2, 7–5
Win	10–1	Sep 2002	Sparkassen Cup, Germany	Tier II	Carpet (i)	(United States) Alexandra Stevenson	(Slovakia) Janette Husárová (Argentina) Paola Suárez	6–3, 7–5
Win	11–1	Jan 2003	Australian Open, Australia (2)	Grand Slam	Hard	(United States) Venus Williams	(Spain) Virginia Ruano Pascual (Argentina) Paola Suárez	4–6, 6–4, 6–3
Win	12–1	Jul 2008	Wimbledon, United Kingdom (3)	Grand Slam	Grass	(United States) Venus Williams	(United States) Lisa Raymond (Australia) Samantha Stosur	6–2, 6–2
Win	13–1	Aug 2008	Summer Olympics, China (2)	Olympics	Hard	(United States) Venus Williams	(Spain) Anabel Medina Garrigues (Spain) Virginia Ruano Pascual	6–2, 6–0
Win	14–1	Jan 2009	Australian Open, Australia (3)	Grand Slam	Hard	(United States) Venus Williams	(Japan) Ai Sugiyama (Slovakia) Daniela Hantuchová	6–3, 6–3
Win	15–1	Jul 2009	Wimbledon, United Kingdom (4)	Grand Slam	Grass	(United States) Venus Williams	(Australia) Samantha Stosur (Australia) Rennae Stubbs	7–6^{(7–4)}, 6–4
Win	16–1	Aug 2009	Stanford Classic, United States	Premier	Hard	(United States) Venus Williams	(Chinese Taipei) Chan Yung-jan (Romania) Monica Niculescu	6–4, 6–1
Win	17–1	Sep 2009	US Open, United States (2)	Grand Slam	Hard	(United States) Venus Williams	(Zimbabwe) Cara Black (United States) Liezel Huber	6–2, 6–2
Win	18–1	Jan 2010	Australian Open, Australia (4)	Grand Slam	Hard	(United States) Venus Williams	(Zimbabwe) Cara Black (United States) Liezel Huber	6–4, 6–3
Win	19–1	May 2010	Madrid Open, Spain	Premier M	Clay	(United States) Venus Williams	(Argentina) Gisela Dulko (Italy) Flavia Pennetta	6–2, 7–5
Win	20–1	Jun 2010	French Open, France (2)	Grand Slam	Clay	(United States) Venus Williams	(Czech Republic) Květa Peschke (Slovenia) Katarina Srebotnik	6–2, 6–3
Win	21–1	Jul 2012	Wimbledon, United Kingdom (5)	Grand Slam	Grass	(United States) Venus Williams	(Czech Republic) Andrea Hlaváčková (Czech Republic) Lucie Hradecká	7–5, 6–4
Win	22–1	Aug 2012	Summer Olympics, United Kingdom (3)	Olympics	Grass	(United States) Venus Williams	(Czech Republic) Andrea Hlaváčková (Czech Republic) Lucie Hradecká	6–4, 6–4
Win	23–1	Jul 2016	Wimbledon, United Kingdom (6)	Grand Slam	Grass	(United States) Venus Williams	(Hungary) Tímea Babos (Kazakhstan) Yaroslava Shvedova	6–3, 6–4
Loss	23–2	Jan 2020	Auckland Open, New Zealand	International	Hard	(Denmark) Caroline Wozniacki	(United States) Asia Muhammad (United States) Taylor Townsend	4–6, 4–6

=== Team competition: 4 (3 titles, 1 runner-up) ===
Result	Date	Tournament	Surface	Partners	Opponents	Score
Win	Sep 1999	Fed Cup, United States	Hard	(United States) Lindsay Davenport (United States) Venus Williams (United States) Monica Seles	(Russia) Elena Makarova (Russia) Elena Likhovtseva (Russia) Elena Dementieva	4–1
Win	Jan 2003	Hopman Cup, Australia	Hard	(United States) James Blake	(Australia) Alicia Molik (Australia) Lleyton Hewitt	3–0
Win	Jan 2008	Hopman Cup, Australia	Hard	(United States) Mardy Fish	(Serbia) Jelena Janković (Serbia) Novak Djokovic	2–1
Loss	Jan 2015	Hopman Cup, Australia	Hard	(United States) John Isner	(Poland) Agnieszka Radwańska (Poland) Jerzy Janowicz	1–2

== Fed Cup participation ==
Current through the 2020 Billie Jean King Cup qualifying round

Group membership World Group (7–1) Qualifying round (1–1) World Group play-off (6–1) World Group II (3–0)	Matches by surface Hard (10–2) Clay (7–1) Grass (0–0)	Matches by type Singles (14–1) Doubles (3–2)	Matches by location United States (10–2) Away (7–1)

=== Singles (14–1) ===
Edition	Round	Date	Location	Opponent nation	Surface	Opponent player	Result	Score	Team result
1999	WG SF	Jul 1999	Ancona, Italy	Italy	Clay	Rita Grande	Win	6–1, 6–1	Win 4–1
2003	WG 1R	Apr 2003	Lowell, United States	Czech Republic	Hard (i)	Iveta Benešová	Win	7–5, 6–1	Win 5–0
2003	WG 1R	Apr 2003	Lowell, United States	Czech Republic	Hard (i)	Klára Koukalová	Win	6–2, 6–2	Win 5–0
2007	WG 1R	Apr 2007	Delray Beach, United States	Belgium	Hard	Caroline Maes	Win	6–1, 6–4	Win 5–0
2012	WG II	Feb 2012	Worcester, United States	Belarus	Hard (i)	Olga Govortsova	Win	7–5, 6–0	Win 5–0
2012	WG II	Feb 2012	Worcester, United States	Belarus	Hard (i)	Anastasiya Yakimova	Win	5–7, 6–1, 6–1	Win 5–0
2012	WG PO	Apr 2012	Kharkiv, Ukraine	Ukraine	Clay	Elina Svitolina	Win	6–2, 6–1	Win 5–0
2012	WG PO	Apr 2012	Kharkiv, Ukraine	Ukraine	Clay	Lesia Tsurenko	Win	6–3, 6–2	Win 5–0
2013	WG PO	Apr 2013	Delray Beach, United States	Sweden	Hard	Johanna Larsson	Win	6–2, 6–2	Win 3–2
2013	WG PO	Apr 2013	Delray Beach, United States	Sweden	Hard	Sofia Arvidsson	Win	6–2, 6–1	Win 3–2
2015	WG II	Feb 2015	Buenos Aires, Argentina	Argentina	Clay	María Irigoyen	Win	7–5, 6–0	Win 4–1
2015	WG PO	Apr 2015	Brindisi, Italy	Italy	Clay	Camila Giorgi	Win	7–6^{(7–5)}, 6–2	Loss 2–3
2015	WG PO	Apr 2015	Brindisi, Italy	Italy	Clay	Sara Errani	Win	4–6, 7–6^{(7–5)}, 6–3	Loss 2–3
2020	QR	Feb 2020	Everett, United States	Latvia	Hard (i)	Jeļena Ostapenko	Win	7–6^{(7–4)}, 7–6^{(7–3)}	Win 3–2
2020	QR	Feb 2020	Everett, United States	Latvia	Hard (i)	Anastasija Sevastova	Loss	6–7^{(5–7)}, 6–3, 6–7^{(4–7)}	Win 3–2

=== Doubles (3–2) ===
Edition	Round	Date	Location	Opponent nation	Surface	Partner	Opponent players	Result	Score	Team result
1999	WG SF	Jul 1999	Ancona, Italy	Italy	Clay	Venus Williams	Tathiana Garbin; Adriana Serra Zanetti	Win	6–2, 6–2	Win 4–1
1999	WG F	Sep 1999	Stanford, United States	Russia	Hard	Venus Williams	Elena Dementieva; Elena Makarova	Win	6–2, 6–1	Win 4–1
2003	WG 1R	Apr 2003	Lowell, United States	Czech Republic	Hard (i)	Venus Williams	Dája Bedáňová; Eva Birnerová	Win	6–0, 6–1	Win 5–0
2015	WG PO	Apr 2015	Brindisi, Italy	Italy	Clay	Alison Riske	Sara Errani; Flavia Pennetta	Loss	0–6, 3–6	Loss 2–3
2018	WG QF	Feb 2018	Asheville, United States	Netherlands	Hard (i)	Venus Williams	Lesley Kerkhove; Demi Schuurs	Loss	2–6, 3–6	Win 3–1

== Top 10 wins ==
Williams has a 178–72 record against players who were, at the time the match was played, ranked in the top 10.

Season	1995	1996	1997	1998	1999	2000	2001	2002	2003	2004	2005	2006	2007	2008	2009	2010	2011	2012	2013	2014	2015	2016	2017	2018	2019	2020	2021	2022	Total
Wins	0	0	2	5	14	5	7	17	10	8	3	0	7	9	14	1	5	18	21	12	6	6	1	1	3	0	2	1	178

#	Player	Rank	Event	Surface	Rd	Score	SWR
1997
1.	(France) Mary Pierce	No. 7	Chicago, US	Carpet (i)	2R	6–3, 7–6^{(7–3)}	No. 304
2.	(United States) Monica Seles	No. 4	Chicago, US	Carpet (i)	QF	4–6, 6–1, 6–1	No. 304
1998
3.	(United States) Lindsay Davenport	No. 3	Sydney, Australia	Hard	QF	1–6, 7–5, 7–5	No. 96
4.	(Romania) Irina Spîrlea	No. 9	Australian Open, Melbourne	Hard	1R	6–7^{(7–9)}, 6–3, 6–1	No. 53
5.	(Romania) Irina Spîrlea	No. 10	Miami, US	Hard	2R	7–6^{(7–4)}, 6–0	No. 40
6.	(Spain) Conchita Martínez	No. 8	Rome, Italy	Clay	3R	6–2, 6–2	No. 31
7.	(Czech Republic) Jana Novotná	No. 3	Filderstadt, Germany	Hard (i)	2R	2–6, 6–3, 2–0 ret.	No. 19
1999
8.	(France) Nathalie Tauziat	No. 9	Paris, France	Carpet (i)	2R	6–1, 6–4	No. 24
9.	(United States) Lindsay Davenport	No. 2	Indian Wells, US	Hard	2R	6–4, 6–2	No. 21
10.	(France) Mary Pierce	No. 8	Indian Wells, US	Hard	QF	7–5, 7–6^{(7–1)}	No. 21
11.	(Germany) Steffi Graf	No. 7	Indian Wells, US	Hard	F	6–3, 3–6, 7–5	No. 21
12.	(United States) Monica Seles	No. 3	Miami, US	Hard	4R	6–2, 6–3	No. 16
13.	(South Africa) Amanda Coetzer	No. 9	Miami, US	Hard	QF	6–4, 6–0	No. 16
14.	(Switzerland) Martina Hingis	No. 1	Miami, US	Hard	SF	6–4, 7–6^{(7–3)}	No. 16
15.	(Spain) Arantxa Sánchez Vicario	No. 8	Los Angeles, US	Hard	QF	6–2, 6–3	No. 11
16.	(Switzerland) Martina Hingis	No. 1	Los Angeles, US	Hard	SF	6–3, 7–5	No. 11
17.	(United States) Monica Seles	No. 4	US Open, New York	Hard	QF	4–6, 6–3, 6–2	No. 6
18.	(United States) Lindsay Davenport	No. 2	US Open, New York	Hard	SF	6–4, 1–6, 6–4	No. 6
19.	(Switzerland) Martina Hingis	No. 1	US Open, New York	Hard	F	6–3, 7–6^{(7–4)}	No. 6
20.	(United States) Lindsay Davenport	No. 2	Grand Slam Cup, Munich	Hard (i)	SF	6–3, 6–4	No. 4
21.	(United States) Venus Williams	No. 3	Grand Slam Cup, Munich	Hard (i)	F	6–1, 3–6, 6–3	No. 4
2000
22.	(France) Julie Halard-Decugis	No. 8	Paris, France	Carpet (i)	SF	6–4, 6–2	No. 4
23.	(Spain) Conchita Martínez	No. 6	Los Angeles, US	Hard	QF	6–2, 4–6, 6–2	No. 7
24.	(Switzerland) Martina Hingis	No. 1	Los Angeles, US	Hard	SF	4–6, 6–2, 6–3	No. 7
25.	(United States) Lindsay Davenport	No. 2	Los Angeles, US	Hard	F	4–6, 6–4, 7–6^{(7–1)}	No. 7
26.	(Spain) Arantxa Sánchez Vicario	No. 9	Montreal, Canada	Hard	SF	6–2, 6–4	No. 7
2001
27.	(United States) Lindsay Davenport	No. 2	Indian Wells, US	Hard	QF	6–1, 6–2	No. 10
28.	(United States) Monica Seles	No. 8	Toronto, Canada	Hard	SF	7–5, 7–6^{(7–5)}	No. 10
29.	(United States) Jennifer Capriati	No. 3	Toronto, Canada	Hard	F	6–1, 6–7^{(9–11)}, 6–3	No. 10
30.	(Belgium) Justine Henin	No. 6	US Open, New York	Hard	4R	7–5, 6–0	No. 10
31.	(United States) Lindsay Davenport	No. 3	US Open, New York	Hard	QF	6–3, 6–7^{(9–11)}, 7–5	No. 10
32.	(Switzerland) Martina Hingis	No. 1	US Open, New York	Hard	SF	6–3, 6–2	No. 10
33.	(Belgium) Justine Henin	No. 6	WTA Tour Championships, Munich	Carpet (i)	QF	6–3, 7–6^{(7–5)}	No. 10
2002
34.	(France) Amélie Mauresmo	No. 9	Sydney, Australia	Hard	QF	6–4, 7–6^{(8–6)}	No. 6
35.	(Switzerland) Martina Hingis	No. 5	Scottsdale, US	Hard	SF	6–1, 3–6, 6–4	No. 9
36.	(United States) Jennifer Capriati	No. 2	Scottsdale, US	Hard	F	6–2, 4–6, 6–4	No. 9
37.	(Switzerland) Martina Hingis	No. 3	Miami, US	Hard	QF	6–4, 6–0	No. 9
38.	(United States) Venus Williams	No. 2	Miami, US	Hard	SF	6–2, 6–2	No. 9
39.	(United States) Jennifer Capriati	No. 1	Miami, US	Hard	F	7–5, 7–6^{(7–4)}	No. 9
40.	(United States) Jennifer Capriati	No. 2	Rome, Italy	Clay	SF	6–2, 3–6, 7–5	No. 4
41.	(Belgium) Justine Henin	No. 8	Rome, Italy	Clay	F	7–6^{(8–6)}, 6–4	No. 4
42.	(United States) Jennifer Capriati	No. 1	French Open, Paris	Clay	SF	3–6, 7–6^{(7–2)}, 6–2	No. 3
43.	(United States) Venus Williams	No. 2	French Open, Paris	Clay	F	7–5, 6–3	No. 3
44.	(United States) Venus Williams	No. 1	Wimbledon, London	Grass	F	7–6^{(7–4)}, 6–3	No. 2
45.	(United States) Lindsay Davenport	No. 10	US Open, New York	Hard	SF	6–3, 7–5	No. 1
46.	(United States) Venus Williams	No. 2	US Open, New York	Hard	F	6–4, 6–3	No. 1
47.	(Belgium) Kim Clijsters	No. 8	Tokyo, Japan	Hard	F	2–6, 6–3, 6–3	No. 1
48.	(Belgium) Justine Henin	No. 7	Leipzig, Germany	Carpet (i)	SF	6–4, 6–2	No. 1
49.	(Federal Republic of Yugoslavia) Jelena Dokic	No. 9	WTA Tour Championships, Los Angeles	Hard (i)	QF	7–6^{(7–1)}, 6–0	No. 1
50.	(United States) Jennifer Capriati	No. 3	WTA Tour Championships, Los Angeles	Hard (i)	SF	2–6, 6–4, 6–4	No. 1
2003
51.	(Belgium) Kim Clijsters	No. 4	Australian Open, Melbourne, Australia	Hard	SF	4–6, 6–3, 7–5	No. 1
52.	(United States) Venus Williams	No. 2	Australian Open, Melbourne	Hard	F	7–6^{(7–4)}, 3–6, 6–4	No. 1
53.	(France) Amélie Mauresmo	No. 7	Paris, France	Carpet (i)	F	6–3, 6–2	No. 1
54.	(Belgium) Kim Clijsters	No. 3	Miami, US	Hard	SF	6–4, 6–2	No. 1
55.	(United States) Jennifer Capriati	No. 5	Miami, US	Hard	F	4–6, 6–4, 6–1	No. 1
56.	(United States) Lindsay Davenport	No. 5	Charleston, US	Clay (green)	SF	6–1, 7–5	No. 1
57.	(France) Amélie Mauresmo	No. 5	French Open, Paris	Clay	QF	6–1, 6–2	No. 1
58.	(United States) Jennifer Capriati	No. 7	Wimbledon, London	Grass	QF	2–6, 6–2, 6–3	No. 1
59.	(Belgium) Justine Henin	No. 3	Wimbledon, London	Grass	SF	6–2, 6–2	No. 1
60.	(United States) Venus Williams	No. 4	Wimbledon, London	Grass	F	4–6, 6–4, 6–2	No. 1
2004
61.	(Russia) Elena Dementieva	No. 8	Miami, US	Hard	F	6–1, 6–1	No. 6
62.	(United States) Jennifer Capriati	No. 7	Wimbledon, London	Grass	QF	6–1, 6–1	No. 10
63.	(France) Amélie Mauresmo	No. 4	Wimbledon, London	Grass	SF	6–7^{(7–9)}, 7–5, 6–4	No. 10
64.	(Russia) Elena Dementieva	No. 6	Los Angeles, US	Hard	SF	6–3, 7–6^{(7–2)}	No. 16
65.	(Russia) Svetlana Kuznetsova	No. 5	Beijing, China	Hard	F	4–6, 7–5, 6–4	No. 10
66.	(Russia) Elena Dementieva	No. 5	WTA Tour Championships, Los Angeles	Hard (i)	RR	7–6^{(7–3)}, 7–5	No. 8
67.	(Russia) Anastasia Myskina	No. 3	WTA Tour Championships, Los Angeles	Hard (i)	RR	4–6, 6–3, 6–4	No. 8
68.	(France) Amélie Mauresmo	No. 2	WTA Tour Championships, Los Angeles	Hard (i)	SF	4–6, 7–6^{(7–2)}, 6–4	No. 8
2005
69.	(France) Amélie Mauresmo	No. 2	Australian Open, Melbourne	Hard	QF	6–2, 6–2	No. 7
70.	(Russia) Maria Sharapova	No. 4	Australian Open, Melbourne	Hard	SF	2–6, 7–5, 8–6	No. 7
71.	(United States) Lindsay Davenport	No. 1	Australian Open, Melbourne	Hard	F	2–6, 6–3, 6–0	No. 7
2007
72.	(Russia) Nadia Petrova	No. 6	Australian Open, Melbourne	Hard	3R	1–6, 7–5, 6–3	No. 81
73.	(Russia) Maria Sharapova	No. 2	Australian Open, Melbourne	Hard	F	6–1, 6–2	No. 81
74.	(Russia) Maria Sharapova	No. 2	Miami, US	Hard	4R	6–1, 6–1	No. 18
75.	(Czech Republic) Nicole Vaidišová	No. 8	Miami, US	Hard	QF	6–1, 6–4	No. 18
76.	(Belgium) Justine Henin	No. 1	Miami, US	Hard	F	0–6, 7–5, 6–3	No. 18
77.	(France) Marion Bartoli	No. 10	US Open, New York	Hard	4R	6–3, 6–4	No. 9
78.	(Russia) Svetlana Kuznetsova	No. 2	Moscow, Russia	Carpet (i)	SF	7–6^{(7–2)}, 6–1	No. 7
2008
79.	(United States) Venus Williams	No. 7	Bangalore, India	Hard	SF	6–3, 3–6, 7–6^{(7–4)}	No. 11
80.	(Belgium) Justine Henin	No. 1	Miami, US	Hard	QF	6–2, 6–0	No. 8
81.	(Russia) Svetlana Kuznetsova	No. 4	Miami, US	Hard	SF	3–6, 7–5, 6–3	No. 8
82.	(Serbia) Jelena Janković	No. 3	Miami, US	Hard	F	6–1, 5–7, 6–3	No. 8
83.	(Russia) Maria Sharapova	No. 4	Charleston, US	Clay (green)	QF	7–5, 4–6, 6–1	No. 9
84.	(United States) Venus Williams	No. 8	US Open, New York	Hard	QF	7–6^{(8–6)}, 7–6^{(9–7)}	No. 3
85.	(Russia) Dinara Safina	No. 7	US Open, New York	Hard	SF	6–3, 6–2	No. 3
86.	(Serbia) Jelena Janković	No. 2	US Open, New York	Hard	F	6–4, 7–5	No. 3
87.	(Russia) Dinara Safina	No. 2	WTA Tour Championships, Doha	Hard	RR	6–4, 6–1	No. 3
2009
88.	(Russia) Svetlana Kuznetsova	No. 8	Australian Open, Melbourne	Hard	QF	5–7, 7–5, 6–1	No. 2
89.	(Russia) Elena Dementieva	No. 4	Australian Open, Melbourne	Hard	SF	6–3, 6–4	No. 2
90.	(Russia) Dinara Safina	No. 3	Australian Open, Melbourne	Hard	F	6–0, 6–3	No. 2
91.	(Serbia) Ana Ivanovic	No. 8	Dubai, UAE	Hard	QF	6–4, 6–4	No. 1
92.	(United States) Venus Williams	No. 6	Miami, US	Hard	SF	6–4, 3–6, 6–3	No. 1
93.	(Belarus) Victoria Azarenka	No. 8	Wimbledon, London	Grass	QF	6–2, 6–3	No. 2
94.	(Russia) Elena Dementieva	No. 4	Wimbledon, London	Grass	SF	6–7^{(7–9)}, 7–5, 8–6	No. 2
95.	(United States) Venus Williams	No. 3	Wimbledon, London	Grass	F	7–6^{(7–3)}, 6–2	No. 2
96.	(Italy) Flavia Pennetta	No. 10	US Open, New York, US	Hard	QF	6–4, 6–3	No. 2
97.	(Russia) Svetlana Kuznetsova	No. 3	WTA Tour Championships, Doha	Hard	RR	7–6^{(8–6)}, 7–5	No. 2
98.	(Russia) Elena Dementieva	No. 5	WTA Tour Championships, Doha	Hard	RR	6–2, 6–4	No. 2
99.	(United States) Venus Williams	No. 7	WTA Tour Championships, Doha	Hard	RR	5–7, 6–4, 7–6^{(7–4)}	No. 2
100.	(Denmark) Caroline Wozniacki	No. 4	WTA Tour Championships, Doha	Hard	SF	6–4, 0–1 ret.	No. 2
101.	(United States) Venus Williams	No. 7	WTA Tour Championships, Doha	Hard	F	6–2, 7–6^{(7–4)}	No. 2
2010
102.	(Belarus) Victoria Azarenka	No. 7	Australian Open, Melbourne	Hard	QF	4–6, 7–6^{(7–4)}, 6–2	No. 1
2011
103.	(Russia) Maria Sharapova	No. 5	Stanford, US	Hard	QF	6–1, 6–3	No. 169
104.	(France) Marion Bartoli	No. 9	Stanford, US	Hard	F	7–5, 6–1	No. 169
105.	(Belarus) Victoria Azarenka	No. 4	Toronto, Canada	Hard	SF	6–3, 6–3	No. 80
106.	(Belarus) Victoria Azarenka	No. 5	US Open, New York	Hard	3R	6–1, 7–6^{(7–5)}	No. 27
107.	(Denmark) Caroline Wozniacki	No. 1	US Open, New York	Hard	SF	6–2, 6–4	No. 27
2012
108.	(Australia) Samantha Stosur	No. 5	Miami, US	Hard	4R	7–5, 6–3	No. 11
109.	(Australia) Samantha Stosur	No. 5	Charleston, US	Clay (green)	SF	6–1, 6–1	No. 10
110.	(Denmark) Caroline Wozniacki	No. 6	Madrid, Spain	Clay (blue)	3R	1–6, 6–3, 6–2	No. 9
111.	(Russia) Maria Sharapova	No. 2	Madrid, Spain	Clay (blue)	QF	6–1, 6–3	No. 9
112.	(Belarus) Victoria Azarenka	No. 1	Madrid, Spain	Clay (blue)	F	6–1, 6–3	No. 9
113.	(Czech Republic) Petra Kvitová	No. 4	Wimbledon, London	Grass	QF	6–3, 7–5	No. 6
114.	(Belarus) Victoria Azarenka	No. 2	Wimbledon, London	Grass	SF	6–3, 7–6^{(8–6)}	No. 6
115.	(Poland) Agnieszka Radwańska	No. 3	Wimbledon, London	Grass	F	6–1, 5–7, 6–2	No. 6
116.	(Denmark) Caroline Wozniacki	No. 8	Summer Olympics, London	Grass	QF	6–0, 6–3	No. 4
117.	(Belarus) Victoria Azarenka	No. 1	Summer Olympics, London	Grass	SF	6–1, 6–2	No. 4
118.	(Russia) Maria Sharapova	No. 3	Summer Olympics, London	Grass	F	6–0, 6–1	No. 4
119.	(Italy) Sara Errani	No. 10	US Open, New York	Hard	SF	6–1, 6–2	No. 4
120.	(Belarus) Victoria Azarenka	No. 1	US Open, New York	Hard	F	6–2, 2–6, 7–5	No. 4
121.	(Germany) Angelique Kerber	No. 5	WTA Tour Championships, Istanbul	Hard (i)	RR	6–4, 6–1	No. 3
122.	(China) Li Na	No. 8	WTA Tour Championships, Istanbul	Hard (i)	RR	7–6^{(7–2)}, 6–3	No. 3
123.	(Belarus) Victoria Azarenka	No. 1	WTA Tour Championships, Istanbul	Hard (i)	RR	6–4, 6–4	No. 3
124.	(Poland) Agnieszka Radwańska	No. 4	WTA Tour Championships, Istanbul	Hard (i)	SF	6–2, 6–1	No. 3
125.	(Russia) Maria Sharapova	No. 2	WTA Tour Championships, Istanbul	Hard (i)	F	6–4, 6–3	No. 3
2013
126.	(Czech Republic) Petra Kvitová	No. 8	Doha, Qatar	Hard	QF	3–6, 6–3, 7–5	No. 2
127.	(Russia) Maria Sharapova	No. 3	Doha, Qatar	Hard	SF	6–3, 6–2	No. 2
128.	(China) Li Na	No. 5	Miami, US	Hard	QF	6–3, 7–6^{(7–5)}	No. 1
129.	(Poland) Agnieszka Radwańska	No. 4	Miami, US	Hard	SF	6–0, 6–3	No. 1
130.	(Russia) Maria Sharapova	No. 2	Miami, US	Hard	F	4–6, 6–3, 6–0	No. 1
131.	(Italy) Sara Errani	No. 7	Madrid, Spain	Clay	SF	7–5, 6–2	No. 1
132.	(Russia) Maria Sharapova	No. 2	Madrid, Spain	Clay	F	6–1, 6–4	No. 1
133.	(Belarus) Victoria Azarenka	No. 3	Rome, Italy	Clay	F	6–1, 6–3	No. 1
134.	(Italy) Sara Errani	No. 5	French Open, Paris	Clay	SF	6–0, 6–1	No. 1
135.	(Russia) Maria Sharapova	No. 2	French Open, Paris	Clay	F	6–4, 6–4	No. 1
136.	(Poland) Agnieszka Radwańska	No. 4	Toronto, Canada	Hard	SF	7–6^{(7–3)}, 6–4	No. 1
137.	(China) Li Na	No. 5	Cincinnati, US	Hard	SF	7–5, 7–5	No. 1
138.	(China) Li Na	No. 6	US Open, New York	Hard	SF	6–0, 6–3	No. 1
139.	(Belarus) Victoria Azarenka	No. 2	US Open, New York	Hard	F	7–5, 6–7^{(6–8)}, 6–1	No. 1
140.	(Denmark) Caroline Wozniacki	No. 8	Beijing, China	Hard	QF	6–1, 6–4	No. 1
141.	(Poland) Agnieszka Radwańska	No. 4	Beijing, China	Hard	SF	6–2, 6–2	No. 1
142.	(Germany) Angelique Kerber	No. 9	WTA Tour Championships, Istanbul	Hard (i)	RR	6–3, 6–1	No. 1
143.	(Poland) Agnieszka Radwańska	No. 4	WTA Tour Championships, Istanbul	Hard (i)	RR	6–2, 6–4	No. 1
144.	(Czech Republic) Petra Kvitová	No. 6	WTA Tour Championships, Istanbul	Hard (i)	RR	6–2, 6–3	No. 1
145.	(Serbia) Jelena Janković	No. 8	WTA Tour Championships, Istanbul	Hard (i)	SF	6–4, 2–6, 6–4	No. 1
146.	(China) Li Na	No. 5	WTA Tour Championships, Istanbul	Hard (i)	F	2–6, 6–3, 6–0	No. 1
2014
147.	(Russia) Maria Sharapova	No. 4	Brisbane, Australia	Hard	SF	6–2, 7–6^{(9–7)}	No. 1
148.	(Belarus) Victoria Azarenka	No. 2	Brisbane, Australia	Hard	F	6–4, 7–5	No. 1
149.	(Serbia) Jelena Janković	No. 7	Dubai, UAE	Hard	QF	6–2, 6–2	No. 1
150.	(Germany) Angelique Kerber	No. 9	Miami, US	Hard	QF	6–2, 6–2	No. 1
151.	(Russia) Maria Sharapova	No. 7	Miami, US	Hard	SF	6–4, 6–3	No. 1
152.	(China) Li Na	No. 2	Miami, US	Hard	F	7–5, 6–1	No. 1
153.	(Germany) Angelique Kerber	No. 8	Stanford, US	Hard	F	7–6^{(7–1)}, 6–3	No. 1
154.	(Serbia) Jelena Janković	No. 9	Cincinnati, US	Hard	QF	6–1, 6–3	No. 1
155.	(Serbia) Ana Ivanovic	No. 7	WTA Tour Championships, Singapore	Hard (i)	RR	6–4, 6–4	No. 1
156.	(Canada) Eugenie Bouchard	No. 5	WTA Tour Championships, Singapore	Hard (i)	RR	6–1, 6–1	No. 1
157.	(Denmark) Caroline Wozniacki	No. 8	WTA Tour Championships, Singapore	Hard (i)	SF	2–6, 6–3, 7–6^{(8–6)}	No. 1
158.	(Romania) Simona Halep	No. 4	WTA Tour Championships, Singapore	Hard (i)	F	6–3, 6–0	No. 1
2015
159.	(Slovakia) Dominika Cibulková	No. 10	Australian Open, Melbourne	Hard	QF	6–2, 6–2	No. 1
160.	(Russia) Maria Sharapova	No. 2	Australian Open, Melbourne	Hard	F	6–3, 7–6^{(7–5)}	No. 1
161.	(Romania) Simona Halep	No. 3	Miami, US	Hard	SF	6–2, 4–6, 7–5	No. 1
162.	(Russia) Maria Sharapova	No. 4	Wimbledon, London	Grass	SF	6–2, 6–4	No. 1
163.	(Serbia) Ana Ivanovic	No. 9	Cincinnati, US	Hard	QF	3–6, 6–4, 6–2	No. 1
164.	(Romania) Simona Halep	No. 3	Cincinnati, US	Hard	F	6–3, 7–6^{(7–5)}	No. 1
2016
165.	(Russia) Maria Sharapova	No. 5	Australian Open, Melbourne	Hard	QF	6–4, 6–1	No. 1
166.	(Poland) Agnieszka Radwańska	No. 4	Australian Open, Melbourne	Hard	SF	6–0, 6–4	No. 1
167.	(Romania) Simona Halep	No. 5	Indian Wells, US	Hard	QF	6–4, 6–3	No. 1
168.	(Poland) Agnieszka Radwańska	No. 3	Indian Wells, US	Hard	SF	6–4, 7–6^{(7–1)}	No. 1
169.	(Germany) Angelique Kerber	No. 4	Wimbledon, London	Grass	F	7–5, 6–3	No. 1
170.	(Romania) Simona Halep	No. 5	US Open, New York	Hard	QF	6–2, 4–6, 6–3	No. 1
2017
171.	(United Kingdom) Johanna Konta	No. 9	Australian Open, Melbourne	Hard	QF	6–2, 6–3	No. 2
2018
172.	(Czech Republic) Karolína Plíšková	No. 8	US Open, New York	Hard	QF	6–4, 6–3	No. 26
2019
173.	(Romania) Simona Halep	No. 1	Australian Open, Melbourne	Hard	4R	6–1, 4–6, 6–4	No. 16
174.	(Japan) Naomi Osaka	No. 2	Toronto, Canada	Hard	QF	6–3, 6–4	No. 10
175.	(Ukraine) Elina Svitolina	No. 5	US Open, New York	Hard	SF	6–3, 6–1	No. 8
2021
176.	(Belarus) Aryna Sabalenka	No. 7	Australian Open, Melbourne	Hard	4R	6–4, 2–6, 6–4	No. 11
177.	(Romania) Simona Halep	No. 2	Australian Open, Melbourne	Hard	QF	6–3, 6–3	No. 11
2022
178.	(Estonia) Anett Kontaveit	No. 2	US Open, New York	Hard	2R	7–6^{(7–4)}, 2–6, 6–2	No. 605

== WTA Tour career earnings ==
Year	Grand Slam singles titles	WTA singles titles	Total singles titles	Earnings ($)	Money list rank
1995–97	0	0	0	28,230	n/a
1998	0	0	0	324,974	21
1999	1	4	5	2,605,102	3
2000	0	3	3	1,026,818	7
2001	0	3	3	2,136,263	3
2002	3	5	8	3,935,668	1
2003	2	2	4	2,504,871	3
2004	0	2	2	2,251,798	2
2005	1	0	1	1,076,226	12
2006	0	0	0	131,705	110
2007	1	1	2	2,102,642	3
2008	1	3	4	3,852,173	1
2009	2	1	3	6,545,586	1
2010	2	0	2	4,266,011	3
2011	0	2	2	1,978,930	10
2012	2	5	7	7,045,975	2
2013	2	9	11	12,385,572	1
2014	1	6	7	9,317,298	1
2015	3	2	5	10,582,642	1
2016	1	1	2	7,675,030	2
2017	1	0	1	2,704,680	13
2018	0	0	0	3,770,170	7
2019	0	0	0	4,310,515	5
2020	0	1	1	1,091,151	11
2021	0	0	0	884,004	30
2022	0	0	0	297,759	258
Career	23	50	73	94,816,730	1

== Longest winning streaks ==
=== 33-win major streak 2002–03 ===
Streak no	Tournament	Start date	Surface	Rd	Opponent	Rank	Res	Score
Last loss	2001 US Open	August 27, 2001	Hard	F	(United States) Venus Williams	#4	L	2–6, 4–6
1	2002 French Open	May 27, 2002	Clay	R1	(Slovakia) Martina Suchá	#39	W	6–3, 6–0
2	2002 French Open	May 27, 2002	Clay	R2	(Madagascar) Dally Randriantefy	#169	W	6–2, 6–3
3	2002 French Open	May 27, 2002	Clay	R3	(Slovakia) Janette Husárová	#41	W	6–1, 6–3
4	2002 French Open	May 27, 2002	Clay	R4	(Russia) Vera Zvonareva	#142	W	4–6, 6–0, 6–1
5	2002 French Open	May 27, 2002	Clay	QF	(France) Mary Pierce	#132	W	6–1, 6–1
6	2002 French Open	May 27, 2002	Clay	SF	(United States) Jennifer Capriati	#1	W	3–6, 7–6^{(7–3)}, 6–2
7	2002 French Open	May 27, 2002	Clay	W	(United States) Venus Williams	#2	W	7–5, 6–3
8	2002 Wimbledon	June 24, 2002	Grass	R1	(Australia) Evie Dominikovic	#103	W	6–1, 6–1
9	2002 Wimbledon	June 24, 2002	Grass	R2	(Italy) Francesca Schiavone	#45	W	6–3, 6–3
10	2002 Wimbledon	June 24, 2002	Grass	R3	(Belgium) Els Callens	#119	W	7–6^{(7–5)}, 7–6^{(7–2)}
11	2002 Wimbledon	June 24, 2002	Grass	R4	(United States) Chanda Rubin	#27	W	6–3, 6–3
12	2002 Wimbledon	June 24, 2002	Grass	QF	(Slovakia) Daniela Hantuchová	#12	W	6–3, 6–2
13	2002 Wimbledon	June 24, 2002	Grass	SF	(France) Amélie Mauresmo	#11	W	6–1, 6–2
14	2002 Wimbledon	June 24, 2002	Grass	W	(United States) Venus Williams	#1	W	7–6^{(7–4)}, 6–3
15	2002 US Open	August 26, 2002	Hard	R1	(United States) Corina Morariu	NR	W	6–2, 6–3
16	2002 US Open	August 26, 2002	Hard	R2	(Russia) Dinara Safina	#91	W	6–0, 6–1
17	2002 US Open	August 26, 2002	Hard	R3	(France) Nathalie Dechy	#26	W	6–1, 6–1
18	2002 US Open	August 26, 2002	Hard	R4	(Slovakia) Dája Bedáňová	#24	W	6–1, 6–1
19	2002 US Open	August 26, 2002	Hard	QF	(Slovakia) Daniela Hantuchová	#12	W	6–2, 6–2
20	2002 US Open	August 26, 2002	Hard	SF	(United States) Lindsay Davenport	#10	W	6–3, 7–5
21	2002 US Open	August 26, 2002	Hard	W	(United States) Venus Williams	#2	W	6–4, 6–3
22	2003 Australian Open	January 13, 2003	Hard	R1	(France) Émilie Loit	#56	W	3–6, 7–6^{(7–5)}, 7–5
23	2003 Australian Open	January 13, 2003	Hard	R2	(Belgium) Els Callens	#66	W	6–4, 6–0
24	2003 Australian Open	January 13, 2003	Hard	R3	(Thailand) Tamarine Tanasugarn	#32	W	6–1, 6–1
25	2003 Australian Open	January 13, 2003	Hard	R4	(Greece) Eleni Daniilidou	#20	W	6–4, 6–1
26	2003 Australian Open	January 13, 2003	Hard	QF	(United States) Meghann Shaughnessy	#33	W	6–2, 6–2
27	2003 Australian Open	January 13, 2003	Hard	SF	(Belgium) Kim Clijsters	#4	W	4–6, 6–3, 7–5
28	2003 Australian Open	January 13, 2003	Hard	W	(United States) Venus Williams	#2	W	7–6^{(7–4)}, 3–6, 6–4
29	2003 French Open	May 26, 2003	Clay	R1	(Germany) Barbara Rittner	#87	W	6–2, 6–1
30	2003 French Open	May 26, 2003	Clay	R2	(Switzerland) Marie-Gayanay Mikaelian	#39	W	6–3, 6–2
31	2003 French Open	May 26, 2003	Clay	R3	(Austria) Barbara Schett	#51	W	6–0, 6–0
32	2003 French Open	May 26, 2003	Clay	R4	(Japan) Ai Sugiyama	#15	W	7–5, 6–3
33	2003 French Open	May 26, 2003	Clay	QF	(France) Amélie Mauresmo	#5	W	6–1, 6–2
End of streak	2003 French Open	May 26, 2003	Clay	SF	(Belgium) Justine Henin-Hardenne	#4	L	2–6, 6–4, 5–7

=== 34-win streak 2013 ===
No.	Match	Tournament	Start date	Category	Surface	Rd	Opponent	Rank	Score
–	676	Qatar Total Open	11 February	Premier 5	Hard	F	(Belarus) Victoria Azarenka	#1	6–7^{(6–8)}, 6–2, 3–6
1	677	Sony Open Tennis	18 March	Premier Mandatory	Hard	2R	(Italy) Flavia Pennetta	#103	6–1, 6–1
2	678	Sony Open Tennis	18 March	Premier Mandatory	Hard	3R	(Japan) Ayumi Morita	#50	6–3, 6–3
3	679	Sony Open Tennis	18 March	Premier Mandatory	Hard	4R	(Slovakia) Dominika Cibulková	#14	2–6, 6–4, 6–2
4	680	Sony Open Tennis	18 March	Premier Mandatory	Hard	QF	(China) Li Na	#5	6–3, 7–6^{(7–5)}
5	681	Sony Open Tennis	18 March	Premier Mandatory	Hard	SF	(Poland) Agnieszka Radwańska	#4	6–0, 6–3
6	682	Sony Open Tennis	18 March	Premier Mandatory	Hard	F	(Russia) Maria Sharapova	#2	4–6, 6–3, 6–0
7	683	Family Circle Cup	1 April	Premier	Clay (green)	2R	(Italy) Camila Giorgi	#85	6–2, 6–3
8	684	Family Circle Cup	1 April	Premier	Clay (green)	3R	(United States) Mallory Burdette	#99	6–4, 6–2
9	685	Family Circle Cup	1 April	Premier	Clay (green)	QF	(Czech Republic) Lucie Šafářová	#19	6–4, 6–1
10	686	Family Circle Cup	1 April	Premier	Clay (green)	SF	(United States) Venus Williams	#24	6–1, 6–2
11	687	Family Circle Cup	1 April	Premier	Clay (green)	F	(Serbia) Jelena Janković	#18	3–6, 6–0, 6–2
12	688	Fed Cup	20 April	Team Event	Hard	–	(Sweden) Johanna Larsson	#66	6–2, 6–2
13	689	Fed Cup	20 April	Team Event	Hard	–	(Sweden) Sofia Arvidsson	#54	6–2, 6–1
14	690	Mutua Madrid Open	6 May	Premier Mandatory	Clay	1R	(Kazakhstan) Yulia Putintseva	#88	7–6^{(7–5)}, 6–1
15	691	Mutua Madrid Open	6 May	Premier Mandatory	Clay	2R	(Spain) Lourdes Domínguez Lino	#47	6–2, 7–5
16	692	Mutua Madrid Open	6 May	Premier Mandatory	Clay	3R	(Russia) Maria Kirilenko	#12	6–3, 6–1
17	693	Mutua Madrid Open	6 May	Premier Mandatory	Clay	QF	(Spain) Anabel Medina Garrigues	#63	6–3, 0–6, 7–5
18	694	Mutua Madrid Open	6 May	Premier Mandatory	Clay	SF	(Italy) Sara Errani	#7	7–5, 6–2
19	695	Mutua Madrid Open	6 May	Premier Mandatory	Clay	F	(Russia) Maria Sharapova	#2	6–1, 6–4
20	696	Italian Open	13 May	Premier 5	Clay	2R	(United Kingdom) Laura Robson	#39	6–2, 6–2
21	697	Italian Open	13 May	Premier 5	Clay	3R	(Slovakia) Dominika Cibulková	#16	6–0, 6–1
22	698	Italian Open	13 May	Premier 5	Clay	QF	(Spain) Carla Suárez Navarro	#22	6–2, 6–0
23	699	Italian Open	13 May	Premier 5	Clay	SF	(Romania) Simona Halep	#64	6–3, 6–0
24	700	Italian Open	13 May	Premier 5	Clay	F	(Belarus) Victoria Azarenka	#3	6–1, 6–3
25	701	French Open	26 May	Grand Slam	Clay	1R	(Georgia (country)) Anna Tatishvili	#83	6–0, 6–1
26	702	French Open	26 May	Grand Slam	Clay	2R	(France) Caroline Garcia	#113	6–1, 6–2
27	703	French Open	26 May	Grand Slam	Clay	3R	(Romania) Sorana Cîrstea	#26	6–0, 6–2
28	704	French Open	26 May	Grand Slam	Clay	4R	(Italy) Roberta Vinci	#15	6–1, 6–3
29	705	French Open	26 May	Grand Slam	Clay	QF	(Russia) Svetlana Kuznetsova	#39	6–1, 3–6, 6–3
30	706	French Open	26 May	Grand Slam	Clay	SF	(Italy) Sara Errani	#5	6–0, 6–1
31	707	French Open	26 May	Grand Slam	Clay	F	(Russia) Maria Sharapova	#2	6–4, 6–4
32	708	Wimbledon Championships	24 June	Grand Slam	Grass	1R	(Luxembourg) Mandy Minella	#92	6–1, 6–3
33	709	Wimbledon Championships	24 June	Grand Slam	Grass	2R	(France) Caroline Garcia	#100	6–3, 6–2
34	710	Wimbledon Championships	24 June	Grand Slam	Grass	3R	(Japan) Kimiko Date-Krumm	#84	6–2, 6–0
–	711	Wimbledon Championships	24 June	Grand Slam	Grass	4R	(Germany) Sabine Lisicki	#23	2–6, 6–1, 4–6

=== 33-win major streak 2014–15 ===
Streak no	Tournament	Start date	Surface	Rd	Opponent	Rank	Res	Score
Last loss	2014 Wimbledon	June 23, 2014	Hard	R3	(France) Alizé Cornet	#25	L	6–1, 3–6, 4–6
1	2014 US Open	August 25, 2014	Hard	R1	(United States) Taylor Townsend	#103	W	6–3, 6–1
2	2014 US Open	August 25, 2014	Hard	R2	(United States) Vania King	#81	W	6–1, 6–0
3	2014 US Open	August 25, 2014	Hard	R3	(United States) Varvara Lepchenko	#52	W	6–3, 6–3
4	2014 US Open	August 25, 2014	Hard	R4	(Estonia) Kaia Kanepi	#50	W	6–3, 6–3
5	2014 US Open	August 25, 2014	Hard	QF	(Italy) Flavia Pennetta	#12	W	6–3, 6–2
6	2014 US Open	August 25, 2014	Hard	SF	(Russia) Ekaterina Makarova	#18	W	6–1, 6–3
7	2014 US Open	August 25, 2014	Hard	W	(Denmark) Caroline Wozniacki	#11	W	6–3, 6–3
8	2015 Australian Open	January 19, 2015	Hard	R1	(Belgium) Alison Van Uytvanck	#106	W	6–0, 6–4
9	2015 Australian Open	January 19, 2015	Hard	R2	(Russia) Vera Zvonareva	#203	W	7–5, 6–0
10	2015 Australian Open	January 19, 2015	Hard	R3	(Ukraine) Elina Svitolina	#26	W	4–6, 6–2, 6–0
11	2015 Australian Open	January 19, 2015	Hard	R4	(Spain) Garbiñe Muguruza	#24	W	2–6, 6–3, 6–2
12	2015 Australian Open	January 19, 2015	Hard	QF	(Slovakia) Dominika Cibulková	#12	W	6–2, 6–2
13	2015 Australian Open	January 19, 2015	Hard	SF	(United States) Madison Keys	#35	W	7–6^{(7–5)}, 6–2
14	2015 Australian Open	January 19, 2015	Hard	W	(Russia) Maria Sharapova	#2	W	6–3, 7–6^{(7–5)}
15	2015 French Open	May 25, 2015	Clay	R1	(Czech Republic) Andrea Hlaváčková	#190	W	6–2, 6–3
16	2015 French Open	May 25, 2015	Clay	R2	(Germany) Anna-Lena Friedsam	#105	W	5–7, 6–3, 6–3
17	2015 French Open	May 25, 2015	Clay	R3	(Belarus) Victoria Azarenka	#27	W	3–6, 6–4, 6–2
18	2015 French Open	May 25, 2015	Clay	R4	(United States) Sloane Stephens	#40	W	1–6, 7–5, 6–3
19	2015 French Open	May 25, 2015	Clay	QF	(Italy) Sara Errani	#17	W	6–1, 6–3
20	2015 French Open	May 25, 2015	Clay	SF	(Switzerland) Timea Bacsinszky	#24	W	4–6, 6–3, 6–0
21	2015 French Open	May 25, 2015	Clay	W	(Czech Republic) Lucie Šafářová	#13	W	6–3, 6–7^{(2–7)}, 6–2
22	2015 Wimbledon	June 29, 2015	Grass	R1	(Russia) Margarita Gasparyan	#113	W	6–4, 6–1
23	2015 Wimbledon	June 29, 2015	Grass	R2	(Hungary) Tímea Babos	#93	W	6–4, 6–1
24	2015 Wimbledon	June 29, 2015	Grass	R3	(United Kingdom) Heather Watson	#32	W	6–2, 4–6, 7–5
25	2015 Wimbledon	June 29, 2015	Grass	R4	(United States) Venus Williams	#16	W	6–4, 6–3
26	2015 Wimbledon	June 29, 2015	Grass	QF	(Belarus) Victoria Azarenka	#24	W	3–6, 6–2, 6–3
27	2015 Wimbledon	June 29, 2015	Grass	SF	(Russia) Maria Sharapova	#4	W	6–2, 6–4
28	2015 Wimbledon	June 29, 2015	Grass	W	(Spain) Garbiñe Muguruza	#20	W	6–4, 6–4
29	2015 US Open	August 31, 2015	Hard	R1	(Russia) Vitalia Diatchenko	#86	W	6–0, 2–0 retired
30	2015 US Open	August 31, 2015	Hard	R2	(Netherlands) Kiki Bertens	#110	W	7–6^{(7–5)}, 6–3
31	2015 US Open	August 31, 2015	Hard	R3	(United States) Bethanie Mattek-Sands	#101	W	3–6, 7–5, 6–0
32	2015 US Open	August 31, 2015	Hard	R4	(United States) Madison Keys	#19	W	6–3, 6–3
33	2015 US Open	August 31, 2015	Hard	QF	(United States) Venus Williams	#23	W	6–2, 1–6, 6–3
End of streak	2015 US Open	August 31, 2015	Hard	SF	(Italy) Roberta Vinci	#43	L	6–2, 4–6, 4–6

== Double bagel matches (6–0, 6–0) ==
Outcome	Year	No.	Championship	Surface	Opponent	Rank	Round
Quarterfinalist	1998	1.	LA Women's Tennis Championships, USA	Hard	(Latvia) Larisa Neiland	90	R32 (first round)
Semifinalist	2003	2.	Roland Garros, Paris, France	Clay	(Austria) Barbara Schett	51	R32 (third round)
Quarterfinalist	2007	3.	Porsche Tennis Grand Prix, Stuttgart, Germany	Hard	(Czech Republic) Zuzana Ondrášková	140	R32 (first round)
Win	2011	4.	Bank of the West Classic, Stanford, USA	Hard	(Australia) Anastasia Rodionova	105	R32 (first round)
Win	2012	5.	US Open, New York, USA	Hard	(Czech Republic) Andrea Hlaváčková	82	R16 (fourth round)
Quarterfinalist	2013	6.	Australian Open, Melbourne, Australia	Hard	(Romania) Edina Gallovits-Hall	110	R128 (first round)
Win	2013	7.	US Open, New York, USA	Hard	(Spain) Carla Suárez Navarro	20	QF

== Grand Slam tournament seedings ==
Boldface indicates tournaments won by Williams, while italics indicates she was the runner-up.

=== Singles ===
Legend seeded No. 1 (**12** / 23) seeded No. 2 (**4** / 7) seeded No. 3 (**1** / 5) seeded No. 4–10 (**5** / 29) seeded No. 11–32 (0 / 8) not seeded (**1** / 10)	Longest / total: 15 / 82; 4 / 82; 1 / 82; 7 / 82; 3 / 82; 5 / 82

Year	Australian Open	French Open	Wimbledon	US Open
1998	unseeded	unseeded	unseeded	unseeded
1999	unseeded	10th	did not play	**7th**
2000	3rd	did not play	8th	5th
2001	6th	6th	5th	10th
2002	did not play	**3rd**	**2nd**	**1st**
2003	**1st**	1st	**1st**	did not play
2004	did not play	2nd	1st	3rd
2005	**7th**	did not play	4th	8th
2006	13th	did not play	did not play	wildcard
2007	**Unseeded**	8th	7th	8th
2008	7th	5th	6th	**4th**
2009	**2nd**	2nd	**2nd**	2nd
2010	**1st**	1st	**1st**	did not play
2011	did not play	did not play	7th	28th/Protected Ranking
2012	12th	5th	**6th**	**4th**
2013	3rd	**1st**	1st	**1st**
2014	1st	1st	1st	**1st**
2015	**1st**	**1st**	**1st**	1st
2016	1st	1st	**1st**	1st
2017	**2nd**	did not play	did not play	did not play
2018	did not play	protected ranking	25th/Protected Ranking	17th
2019	16th	10th	11th	8th
2020	8th	6th	tournament cancelled	3rd
2021	10th	7th	6th	did not play
2022	did not play	did not play	wildcard	Protected Ranking
2023	did not play (retired)			
2024	did not play (retired)			
2025	did not play (retired)			
2026	did not play (retired)		wildcard	

=== Doubles ===
Year	Australian Open	French Open	Wimbledon	US Open
1997	did not play	did not play	did not play	wild card
1998	not seeded	did not play	not seeded	did not play
1999	not seeded	**9th (1)**	did not play	**5th (2)**
2000	did not play	did not play	**8th (3)**	wild card
2001	**wild card (4)**	did not play	4th	9th
2002	did not play	did not play	**3rd (5)**	did not play
2003	**1st (6)**	did not play	3rd	did not play
2004	did not play			
2005	did not play			
2006	did not play			
2007	did not play	did not play	wild card	did not play
2008	not seeded	did not play	**11th (7)**	did not play
2009	**10th (8)**	5th	**4th (9)**	**4th (10)**
2010	**2nd (11)**	**1st (12)**	1st	did not play
2011	did not play			
2012	did not play	did not play	**not seeded (13)**	wild card
2013	12th	12th	did not play	not seeded
2014	did not play	did not play	8th	not seeded
2015	did not play			
2016	did not play	not seeded	**not seeded (14)**	did not play
2017	did not play			
2018	did not play	wild card	did not play	did not play
2019	did not play			
2020	did not play			
2021	did not play			
2022	did not play	did not play	did not play	wild card
