= 2001 Open Gaz de France =

- Date: 6–11 February
- Edition: 9th
- Category: Tier II
- Draw: 28S / 16D
- Prize money: $565,000
- Surface: Hard Greenset / indoor
- Location: Paris, France
- Venue: Stade Pierre de Coubertin

Champions

Singles
- (France) Amélie Mauresmo

Doubles
- (Croatia) Iva Majoli / (France) Virginie Razzano
← 2000 ·	Open Gaz de France	· 2002 →

The 2001 Open Gaz de France was a women's tennis tournament played on indoor hard courts at the Stade Pierre de Coubertin in Paris, France, and was part of Tier II of the 2001 WTA Tour. It was the ninth edition of the tournament and ran from 6 February until 11 February 2001. Eighth-seeded Amélie Mauresmo won the singles title and earned $90,000 first-prize money.

== Finals ==
=== Singles ===
(France) Amélie Mauresmo defeated (Germany) Anke Huber 7–6^{(7–2)}, 6–1

- It was Mauresmo's only singles title of the year and the 3rd of her career.

=== Doubles ===
(Croatia) Iva Majoli / (France) Virginie Razzano defeated (United States) Kimberly Po / (France) Nathalie Tauziat 6–3, 7–5

- It was Majoli's only title of the year and the 8th of her career. It was Razzano's only title of the year and the 1st title of her career.
