= 2002 Open Gaz de France – Singles =

Singles
- 2002 Open Gaz de France

Final
- Champion: (United States) Venus Williams
- Runner-up: (Federal Republic of Yugoslavia) Jelena Dokić
- Score: Walkover

Details
- Draw: 28
- Seeds: 8

Events
Singles	Doubles
← 2001 ·	Open Gaz de France	· 2003 →

Amélie Mauresmo was the defending champion but lost in the semifinals to Venus Williams.

Williams won the final on a walkover when Jelena Dokić withdrew with a strain of the right thigh.

== Seeds ==
A champion seed is indicated in bold text while text in italics indicates the round in which that seed was eliminated. The top four seeds received a bye to the second round.

1. (United States) **Venus Williams (champion)**
2. (Belgium) Justine Henin (quarterfinals)
3. (France) Amélie Mauresmo (semifinals)
4. (Federal Republic of Yugoslavia) Jelena Dokić (final, withdrew with right thigh strain)
5. (United States) Monica Seles (semifinals)
6. (France) Sandrine Testud (withdrew with a neck inflammation)
7. (Bulgaria) Magdalena Maleeva (first round)
8. (Italy) Silvia Farina Elia (quarterfinals)
9. (Russia) Elena Dementieva (quarterfinals)

== Draw ==
=== Key ===
- Q = Qualifier
- WC = Wild card
- LL = Lucky loser
- Alt = Alternate
- SE = Special exempt
- PR = Protected ranking
- ITF = ITF entry
- JE = Junior exempt
- w/o = Walkover
- r = Retired
- d = Defaulted
- SR = Special ranking

=== Final ===
Final
1	(United States) **Venus Williams**	**w/o**
4	(Federal Republic of Yugoslavia) Jelena Dokić

=== Top half ===
First round
(Slovakia) H Nagyová	3	2	r
LL	(United States) **M Tu**	**6**	**4**
WC	(France) A-G Sidot	3	**7^{7}**	6^{5}
(Luxembourg) **A Kremer**	**6**	6^{3}	**7^{7}**
(Spain) Á Montolio	2	2
8	(Italy) **S Farina Elia**	**6**	**6**
WC	(Russia) **A Kournikova**	6^{3}	**6**	**6**
Q	(Switzerland) E Gagliardi	**7^{7}**	4	4
(Italy) **F Schiavone**	**6**	1	**6**
(Germany) M Weingärtner	3	**6**	4
(Slovakia) **D Hantuchová**	**7**	**6**
7	(Bulgaria) M Maleeva	5	4

Second round
1	(United States) **V Williams**	**6**	**6**
LL	(United States) M Tu	1	3
(Luxembourg) A Kremer	3	2
8	(Italy) **S Farina Elia**	**6**	**6**
3	(France) **A Mauresmo**	**6**	**7**
WC	(Russia) A Kournikova	3	5
(Italy) **F Schiavone**	**6**	**7**
(Slovakia) D Hantuchová	2	5

Quarterfinals
1	(United States) **V Williams**	**6**	**6**
8	(Italy) S Farina Elia	2	1
3	(France) **A Mauresmo**	**6**	**6**
(Italy) F Schiavone	2	2

Semifinals
1	(United States) **V Williams**	4	**7^{7}**	**7**
3	(France) A Mauresmo	**6**	6^{3}	5

=== Bottom half ===
First round
9	(Russia) **E Dementieva**	3	**6**	**7**
Q	(Russia) E Bovina	**6**	3	5
(Russia) E Likhovtseva	3	4
Q	(Germany) **G Arn**	**6**	**6**
(Switzerland) P Schnyder	**6**	5	3
(Spain) **C Torrens Valero**	1	**7**	**6**
5	(United States) **M Seles**	**6**	**6**
(Austria) B Schett	2	3
Q	(Italy) **A Serra Zanetti**	2	**7**	**6**
(Spain) M Serna	**6**	5	4
WC	(France) **N Dechy**	**6**	3	**6**
(Czech Republic) D Bedáňová	3	**6**	4

Second round
9	(Russia) **E Dementieva**	**7^{7}**	**6**
Q	(Germany) G Arn	6^{3}	4
(Spain) C Torrens Valero	3	2
4	(Federal Republic of Yugoslavia) **J Dokić**	**6**	**6**
5	(United States) **M Seles**	**7**	**6**
Q	(Italy) A Serra Zanetti	5	2
WC	(France) N Dechy	4	**6**	6^{8}
2	(Belgium) **J Henin**	**6**	3	**7^{10}**

Quarterfinals
9	(Russia) E Dementieva	**7**	1	2
4	(Federal Republic of Yugoslavia) **J Dokić**	5	**6**	**6**
5	(United States) **M Seles**	**6**	**6**
2	(Belgium) J Henin	4	3

Semifinals
4	(Federal Republic of Yugoslavia) **J Dokić**	**6**	3	**6**
5	(United States) M Seles	3	**6**	4
