= 2001 Open Gaz de France – Doubles =

Doubles
- 2001 Open Gaz de France

Final
- Champions: (Croatia) Iva Majoli (France) Virginie Razzano
- Runners-up: (United States) Kimberly Po (France) Nathalie Tauziat
- Score: 6–3, 7–5

Events
Singles	Doubles
← 2000 ·	Open Gaz de France	· 2002 →

Julie Halard-Decugis and Sandrine Testud were the defending champions but did not compete that year.

Iva Majoli and Virginie Razzano won in the final 6–3, 7–5 against Kimberly Po and Nathalie Tauziat.

== Seeds ==
Champion seeds are indicated in bold text while text in italics indicates the round in which those seeds were eliminated.

1. (United States) Kimberly Po / (France) Nathalie Tauziat (final)
2. (Russia) Elena Likhovtseva / (France) Mary Pierce (quarterfinals)
3. (Belgium) Els Callens / (France) Anne-Gaëlle Sidot (first round)
4. (Belgium) Laurence Courtois / (United States) Meghann Shaughnessy (first round)

== Draw ==
=== Key ===
- Q = Qualifier
- WC = Wild card
- LL = Lucky loser
- Alt = Alternate
- SE = Special exempt
- PR = Protected ranking
- ITF = ITF entry
- JE = Junior exempt
- w/o = Walkover
- r = Retired
- d = Defaulted
- SR = Special ranking

First round
1	(United States) **K Po** (France) **N Tauziat**	**6**	**6**
(Slovakia) K Habšudová (Canada) S Jeyaseelan	4	1
(Germany) **A Huber** (Germany) **B Lamade**	3	**6**	**6**
(Spain) E Bes (Belarus) T Poutchek	**6**	3	4
3	(Belgium) E Callens (France) A-G Sidot	0	3
(Sweden) **Å Carlsson** (Bulgaria) **M Maleeva**	**6**	**6**
(France) **N Dechy** (France) **É Loit**	**6**	4	**7^{7}**
(Japan) R Hiraki (Hungary) K Marosi-Aracama	4	**6**	6^{3}
(Switzerland) **P Schnyder** (Spain) **M Serna**	**w/o**
(Germany) A Glass (Czech Republic) K Hrdličková
WC	(Croatia) **I Majoli** (France) **V Razzano**	**7^{7}**	1	**6**
4	(Belgium) L Courtois (United States) M Shaughnessy	6^{4}	**6**	2
Q	(Bulgaria) L Bacheva (France) C Dhenin	4	2
(Romania) **R Dragomir** (Italy) **S Farina Elia**	**6**	**6**
(United States) A Frazier (Netherlands) C Vis	6^{5}	**7**	3
2	(Russia) **E Likhovtseva** (France) **M Pierce**	**7^{7}**	5	**6**

Quarterfinals
1	(United States) **K Po** (France) **N Tauziat**	**6**	**6**
(Germany) A Huber (Germany) B Lamade	3	1
(Sweden) **Å Carlsson** (Bulgaria) **M Maleeva**	**6**	**6**
(France) N Dechy (France) É Loit	3	2
(Switzerland) P Schnyder (Spain) M Serna	4	3
WC	(Croatia) **I Majoli** (France) **V Razzano**	**6**	**6**
(Romania) **R Dragomir** (Italy) **S Farina Elia**	**6**	**6**
2	(Russia) E Likhovtseva (France) M Pierce	3	2

Semifinals
1	(United States) **K Po** (France) **N Tauziat**	**6**	**6**
(Sweden) Å Carlsson (Bulgaria) M Maleeva	2	3
WC	(Croatia) **I Majoli** (France) **V Razzano**	**6**	**7^{7}**
(Romania) R Dragomir (Italy) S Farina Elia	1	6^{4}

Final
1	(United States) Kimberly Po (France) Nathalie Tauziat	3	5
WC	(Croatia) **Iva Majoli** (France) **Virginie Razzano**	**6**	**7**
