= 2002 Open Gaz de France – Doubles =

Doubles
- 2002 Open Gaz de France

Final
- Champions: (France) Nathalie Dechy (United States) Meilen Tu
- Runners-up: (Russia) Elena Dementieva (Slovakia) Janette Husárová
- Score: Walkover

Events
Singles	Doubles
← 2001 ·	Open Gaz de France	· 2003 →

Virginie Razzano and Iva Majoli were the defending champions but only Razzano competed that year with Émilie Loit.

Loit and Razzano lost in the first round to Jelena Dokić and Magdalena Maleeva.

Nathalie Dechy and Meilen Tu won the final on a walkover when Janette Husárová and Elena Dementieva were forced to withdraw when Dementieva developed bronchitis.

== Seeds ==
Champion seeds are indicated in bold text while text in italics indicates the round in which those seeds were eliminated.

1. (Slovakia) Daniela Hantuchová / (Russia) Elena Likhovtseva (quarterfinals)
2. (Czech Republic) Květa Hrdličková / (Slovakia) Henrieta Nagyová (withdrew, right wrist injury Nagyová)
3. (Austria) Barbara Schett / (Spain) Magüi Serna (first round)
4. (Federal Republic of Yugoslavia) Jelena Dokić / (Bulgaria) Magdalena Maleeva (semifinals)

== Draw ==
=== Key ===
- Q = Qualifier
- WC = Wild card
- LL = Lucky loser
- Alt = Alternate
- SE = Special exempt
- PR = Protected ranking
- ITF = ITF entry
- JE = Junior exempt
- w/o = Walkover
- r = Retired
- d = Defaulted
- SR = Special ranking

First round
1	(Slovakia) **D Hantuchová** (Russia) **E Likhovtseva**	4	**6**	**6**
(Czech Republic) D Bedáňová (Russia) E Bovina	**6**	4	1
(Spain) E Bes (Spain) M Marrero	4	3
(Russia) **E Dementieva** (Slovakia) **J Husárová**	**6**	**6**
3	(Austria) B Schett (Spain) M Serna	4	4
(France) **C Dhenin** (Belarus) **T Poutchek**	**6**	**6**
(Italy) **T Garbin** (Italy) **F Schiavone**	**6**	**6**
WC	(France) S Cohen-Aloro (France) S Foretz	2	2
Q	(Croatia) M Palaveršić-Coopersmith (Venezuela) M Vento-Kabchi	1	5
(United States) **S Reeves** (Germany) **M Weingärtner**	**6**	**7**
(France) É Loit (France) V Razzano	1	4
4	(Federal Republic of Yugoslavia) **J Dokić** (Bulgaria) **M Maleeva**	**6**	**6**
(Netherlands) **M Oremans** (Switzerland) **P Schnyder**	**6**	**6**
(South Africa) K Grant (United States) A Spears	0	2
(France) **N Dechy** (United States) **M Tu**	**6**	**7^{7}**
LL	(Greece) E Daniilidou (Germany) C Schneider	4	6^{4}

Quarterfinals
1	(Slovakia) D Hantuchová (Russia) E Likhovtseva	0	5
(Russia) **E Dementieva** (Slovakia) **J Husárová**	**6**	**7**
(France) C Dhenin (Belarus) T Poutchek	2	**6**	2
(Italy) **T Garbin** (Italy) **F Schiavone**	**6**	3	**6**
(United States) S Reeves (Germany) M Weingärtner	6^{4}	2
4	(Federal Republic of Yugoslavia) **J Dokić** (Bulgaria) **M Maleeva**	**7^{7}**	**6**
(Netherlands) M Oremans (Switzerland) P Schnyder	6^{5}	4
(France) **N Dechy** (United States) **M Tu**	**7^{7}**	**6**

Semifinals
(Russia) **E Dementieva** (Slovakia) **J Husárová**	**6**	**6**
(Italy) T Garbin (Italy) F Schiavone	1	4
4	(Federal Republic of Yugoslavia) J Dokić (Bulgaria) M Maleeva	4	6^{4}
(France) **N Dechy** (United States) **M Tu**	**6**	**7^{7}**

Final
(Russia) Elena Dementieva (Slovakia) Janette Husárová
(France) **Nathalie Dechy** (United States) **Meilen Tu**	**w/o**
