= 2002 Open Gaz de France =

- Date: 4–9 February
- Edition: 10th
- Category: Tier II
- Draw: 28S / 16D
- Prize money: $585,000
- Location: Paris, France
- Venue: Stade Pierre de Coubertin

Champions

Singles
- (United States) Venus Williams

Doubles
- (France) Nathalie Dechy / (United States) Meilen Tu
| ← 2001 · | Open Gaz de France | · 2003 → |

The 2002 Open Gaz de France was a women's tennis tournament played on indoor hard courts at the Stade Pierre de Coubertin in Paris in France that was part of Tier II of the 2002 WTA Tour. It was the tenth edition of the tournament and was held from 4 February through 9 February 2002. First-seeded Venus Williams won the singles title.

== Finals ==
=== Singles ===
(United States) Venus Williams defeated (Federal Republic of Yugoslavia) Jelena Dokić by walkover

- It was Williams' 2nd title of the year and the 32nd title of her career.

=== Doubles ===
(France) Nathalie Dechy / (United States) Meilen Tu defeated (Russia) Elena Dementieva / (Slovakia) Janette Husárová by walkover

- It was Dechy's only title of the year and the 1st title of her career. It was Tu's only title of the year and the 2nd of her career.
