= 1999 Open Gaz de France – Doubles =

Doubles
- 1999 Open Gaz de France

Final
- Champions: (Romania) Irina Spîrlea (Netherlands) Caroline Vis
- Runners-up: (Russia) Elena Likhovtseva (Japan) Ai Sugiyama
- Score: 7–5, 3–6, 6–3

Events
Singles	Doubles
← 1998 ·	Open Gaz de France	· 2000 →

The 1999 Open Gaz de France doubles was the doubles event of the seventh edition of the Open GDF Suez; a WTA Tier II tournament held in Paris, France. Sabine Appelmans and Miriam Oremans were the defending champions but lost in the first round to Elena Likhovtseva and Ai Sugiyama.

Irina Spîrlea and Caroline Vis won in the final 7–5, 3–6, 6–3 against Likhovtseva and Sugiyama.

== Seeds ==
1. (France) Alexandra Fusai / (France) Nathalie Tauziat (quarterfinals)
2. (Russia) Elena Likhovtseva / (Japan) Ai Sugiyama (final)
3. (Romania) Irina Spîrlea / (Netherlands) Caroline Vis (champions)
4. (Belgium) Els Callens / (France) Julie Halard-Decugis (semifinals)

== Draw ==
=== Key ===
- Q = Qualifier
- WC = Wild card
- LL = Lucky loser
- Alt = Alternate
- SE = Special exempt
- PR = Protected ranking
- ITF = ITF entry
- JE = Junior exempt
- w/o = Walkover
- r = Retired
- d = Defaulted
- SR = Special ranking

First round
1	(France) A Fusai (France) N Tauziat	6	6
(Germany) C Singer (Czech Republic) H Vildová	1	1
(Slovakia) K Habšudová (Spain) V Ruano Pascual	6	7
(Canada) M Drake (Czech Republic) E Melicharová	4	5
3	(Romania) I Spîrlea (Netherlands) C Vis	6
(France) L Ghirardi (France) S Pitkowski	1	r
(Sweden) Å Carlsson (France) A-G Sidot	w/o
(France) A Mauresmo (France) S Testud
(Italy) L Golarsa (Ukraine) O Lugina	5	4
(Croatia) I Majoli (Belgium) D Van Roost	7	6
(France) C Dhenin (France) É Loit	2	2
4	(Belgium) E Callens (France) J Halard-Decugis	6	6
Q	(Greece) E Daniilidou (Federal Republic of Yugoslavia) S Naćuk	4	6	3
WC	(France) A Cocheteux (France) N Dechy	6	1	6
(Belgium) S Appelmans (Netherlands) M Oremans	4	4
2	(Russia) E Likhovtseva (Japan) A Sugiyama	6	6

Quarterfinals
1	(France) A Fusai (France) N Tauziat	6	3	1
(Slovakia) K Habšudová (Spain) V Ruano Pascual	4	6	6
3	(Romania) I Spîrlea (Netherlands) C Vis	6	6
(Sweden) Å Carlsson (France) A-G Sidot	4	1
(Croatia) I Majoli (Belgium) D Van Roost	6	2	4
4	(Belgium) E Callens (France) J Halard-Decugis	2	6	6
WC	(France) A Cocheteux (France) N Dechy
2	(Russia) E Likhovtseva (Japan) A Sugiyama	w/o

Semifinals
(Slovakia) K Habšudová (Spain) V Ruano Pascual	6^{3}	5
3	(Romania) I Spîrlea (Netherlands) C Vis	7^{7}	7
4	(Belgium) E Callens (France) J Halard-Decugis	6	5	6^{3}
2	(Russia) E Likhovtseva (Japan) A Sugiyama	0	7	7^{7}

Final
3	(Romania) I Spîrlea (Netherlands) C Vis	7	3	6
2	(Russia) E Likhovtseva (Japan) A Sugiyama	5	6	3

== Qualifying ==
Qualifying competition
1	(Greece) Eleni Daniilidou (Federal Republic of Yugoslavia) Sandra Naćuk	8
2	(France) Stéphanie Foretz (France) Samantha Schoeffel	5
