= 1999 Open Gaz de France – Singles =

Singles
- 1999 Open Gaz de France

Final
- Champion: (United States) Serena Williams
- Runner-up: (France) Amélie Mauresmo
- Score: 6–2, 3–6, 7–6^{(7–4)}

Details
- Draw: 28
- Seeds: 8

Events
Singles	Doubles
← 1998 ·	Open Gaz de France	· 2000 →

The 1999 Open Gaz de France singles was the singles event of the seventh edition of the Open GDF Suez; a WTA Tier II tournament held in Paris, France. Mary Pierce was the defending champion but did not compete that year.

Serena Williams won in the final 6–2, 3–6, 7–6^{(7–4)} against Amélie Mauresmo. It was her first career singles title.

== Seeds ==
The top four seeds received a bye to the second round.

1. (Switzerland) Martina Hingis (quarterfinals)
2. (France) Nathalie Tauziat (second round)
3. (Belgium) Dominique Van Roost (semifinals)
4. (Romania) Irina Spîrlea (second round)
5. (France) Sandrine Testud (first round)
6. (France) Amélie Mauresmo (final)
7. (France) Julie Halard-Decugis (quarterfinals)
8. (Russia) Elena Likhovtseva (quarterfinals)

== Draw ==
=== Key ===
- Q = Qualifier
- WC = Wild card
- LL = Lucky loser
- Alt = Alternate
- SE = Special exempt
- PR = Protected ranking
- ITF = ITF entry
- JE = Junior exempt
- w/o = Walkover
- r = Retired
- d = Defaulted
- SR = Special ranking

=== Finals ===
Semifinals
6	(France) Amélie Mauresmo	6	7^{7}
3	(Belgium) Dominique Van Roost	0	6^{5}
(France) Nathalie Dechy	1	4
(United States) Serena Williams	6	6

Final
6	(France) Amélie Mauresmo	2	6	6^{4}
(United States) Serena Williams	6	3	7^{7}

=== Top half ===
First round
Q	(Federal Republic of Yugoslavia) S Naćuk	6	2	7^{7}
(France) S Pitkowski	4	6	6^{4}
WC	(France) É Loit	6	4	1
Q	(Slovakia) K Habšudová	3	6	6
LL	(France) L Andretto	2	5
6	(France) A Mauresmo	6	7
(Japan) A Sugiyama	1	6	1
(Spain) V Ruano Pascual	6	3	6
LL	(Czech Republic) S Kleinová	6	2	6
(France) A Fusai	2	6	0
WC	(Belgium) S Appelmans	6^{4}	3
8	(Russia) E Likhovtseva	7^{7}	6

Second round
1	(Switzerland) M Hingis	6	6
Q	(Federal Republic of Yugoslavia) S Naćuk	1	1
Q	(Slovakia) K Habšudová	2	1
6	(France) A Mauresmo	6	6
3	(Belgium) D Van Roost	6	6
(Spain) V Ruano Pascual	4	0
LL	(Czech Republic) S Kleinová	4	5
8	(Russia) E Likhovtseva	6	7

Quarterfinals
1	(Switzerland) M Hingis	6	1	3
6	(France) A Mauresmo	2	6	6
3	(Belgium) D Van Roost	7	6
8	(Russia) E Likhovtseva	5	0

Semifinals
6	(France) A Mauresmo	6	7^{7}
3	(Belgium) D Van Roost	0	6^{5}

=== Bottom half ===
First round
5	(France) S Testud	5	2
(France) N Dechy	7	6
(Ukraine) E Tatarkova	5	2
(Croatia) I Majoli	7	6
(Israel) A Smashnova	3	3
WC	(France) A Cocheteux	6	6
7	(France) J Halard-Decugis	6	6
(Venezuela) M Vento	4	0
Q	(France) A-G Sidot	6	4	6
LL	(Belgium) L Courtois	3	6	2
Q	(Sweden) Å Carlsson	1	2
(United States) S Williams	6	6

Second round
(France) N Dechy	6	2	6
(Croatia) I Majoli	2	6	2
WC	(France) A Cocheteux	6	6
4	(Romania) I Spîrlea	4	2
7	(France) J Halard-Decugis	6	6
Q	(France) A-G Sidot	1	2
(United States) S Williams	6	6
2	(France) N Tauziat	1	4

Quarterfinals
(France) N Dechy	6	4	6
WC	(France) A Cocheteux	1	6	1
7	(France) J Halard-Decugis	2	3
(United States) S Williams	6	6

Semifinals
(France) N Dechy	1	4
(United States) S Williams	6	6

== Qualifying ==
=== Seeds ===
1. (Netherlands) Miriam Oremans (first round)
2. (Slovakia) Karina Habšudová (Qualifier)
3. (France) Anne-Gaëlle Sidot (Qualifier)
4. (Venezuela) María Vento (moved to main draw)
5. (Belgium) Els Callens (first round)
6. (Canada) Maureen Drake (second round)
7. (Latvia) Larisa Neiland (first round, retired)
8. (Croatia) Silvija Talaja (first round)

=== Qualifiers ===
1. (Sweden) Åsa Carlsson
2. (France) Anne-Gaëlle Sidot
3. (Federal Republic of Yugoslavia) Sandra Naćuk
4. (Slovakia) Karina Habšudová

=== Lucky losers ===
1. (Belgium) Laurence Courtois
2. (France) Laurence Andretto
3. (Czech Republic) Sandra Kleinová

== Qualifying draw ==
=== Key ===
- Q = Qualifier
- WC = Wild card
- LL = Lucky loser
- Alt = Alternate
- SE = Special exempt
- PR = Protected ranking
- ITF = ITF entry
- JE = Junior exempt
- w/o = Walkover
- r = Retired
- d = Defaulted
- SR = Special ranking

=== First qualifier ===
First round
1	(Netherlands) Miriam Oremans	2	7	4
(Italy) Laura Golarsa	6	5	6
(Belgium) Laurence Courtois	6	6
(Austria) Barbara Schwartz	2	3
(Italy) Adriana Serra Zanetti	5	3
(Sweden) Åsa Carlsson	7	6
(Czech Republic) Denisa Chládková	6	6
8	(Croatia) Silvija Talaja	4	3

Second round
(Italy) Laura Golarsa	5	5
(Belgium) Laurence Courtois	7	7
(Sweden) Åsa Carlsson	6	6^{4}	6
(Czech Republic) Denisa Chládková	0	7^{7}	4

Qualifying competition
(Belgium) Laurence Courtois	3	2
(Sweden) Åsa Carlsson	6	6

=== Second qualifier ===
First round
3	(France) Anne-Gaëlle Sidot	6	7
(Russia) Eugenia Kulikovskaya	1	5
WC	(Greece) Eleni Daniilidou	0	6	5
(Italy) Flora Perfetti	6	4	7
(Ukraine) Olga Lugina	7^{7}	2	5
(France) Laurence Andretto	6^{2}	6	7
(Germany) Marlene Weingärtner	3	3
6	(Canada) Maureen Drake	6	6

Second round
3	(France) Anne-Gaëlle Sidot	6	6
(Italy) Flora Perfetti	2	3
(France) Laurence Andretto	6	7
6	(Canada) Maureen Drake	1	5

Qualifying competition
3	(France) Anne-Gaëlle Sidot	6	2	6
(France) Laurence Andretto	4	6	1

=== Third qualifier ===
First round
5	(Belgium) Els Callens	0	6
(Germany) Petra Begerow	6	7^{7}
(Czech Republic) Sandra Kleinová	6	6
(Germany) Miriam Schnitzer	3	1
(Federal Republic of Yugoslavia) Sandra Naćuk	6	6
(Germany) Anca Barna	3	1
(Germany) Julia Abe	6	6
Alt	(Italy) Germana Di Natale	2	0

Second round
(Germany) Petra Begerow	0	2
(Czech Republic) Sandra Kleinová	6	6
(Federal Republic of Yugoslavia) Sandra Naćuk	7^{7}	6
(Germany) Julia Abe	6^{3}	4

Qualifying competition
(Czech Republic) Sandra Kleinová	3	6^{2}
(Federal Republic of Yugoslavia) Sandra Naćuk	6	7^{7}

=== Fourth qualifier ===
First round
7	(Latvia) Larisa Neiland	6	1	0^{r}
(Czech Republic) Adriana Gerši	4	6	1
(France) Stéphanie Foretz	6	4	6
(France) Sophie Georges	0	6	4
(Italy) Antonella Serra Zanetti	3	0
(France) Sophie Lefèvre	6	6
(France) Lea Ghirardi	1	2
2	(Slovakia) Karina Habšudová	6	6

Second round
(Czech Republic) Adriana Gerši	7^{7}	2	4
(France) Stéphanie Foretz	6^{3}	6	6
(France) Sophie Lefèvre	4	1
2	(Slovakia) Karina Habšudová	6	6

Qualifying competition
(France) Stéphanie Foretz	3	1
2	(Slovakia) Karina Habšudová	6	6
