= 2000 Open Gaz de France – Doubles =

Doubles
- 2000 Open Gaz de France

Final
- Champions: (France) Julie Halard-Decugis (France) Sandrine Testud
- Runners-up: (Sweden) Åsa Carlsson (France) Émilie Loit
- Score: 3–6, 6–3, 6–4

Events
Singles	Doubles
← 1999 ·	Open Gaz de France	· 2001 →

Irina Spîrlea and Caroline Vis were the defending champions, but lost in semifinals to Julie Halard-Decugis and Sandrine Testud.

Julie Halard-Decugis and Sandrine Testud won the title by defeating Åsa Carlsson and Émilie Loit 3–6, 6–3, 6–4 in the final.

== Seeds ==
1. (France) ~~Alexandra Fusai~~ / (France) ~~Nathalie Tauziat~~ (withdrew)
2. (Romania) Irina Spîrlea / (Netherlands) Caroline Vis (semifinals)
3. (France) Julie Halard-Decugis / (France) Sandrine Testud (champions)
4. (Slovakia) Karina Habšudová / (Russia) Elena Likhovtseva (first round)

== Draw ==
=== Key ===
- Q = Qualifier
- WC = Wild card
- LL = Lucky loser
- Alt = Alternate
- SE = Special exempt
- PR = Protected ranking
- ITF = ITF entry
- JE = Junior exempt
- w/o = Walkover
- r = Retired
- d = Defaulted
- SR = Special ranking

=== Draw ===
First round
LL	(France) S Pitkowski (United Kingdom) J Pullin	3	7^{9}	4
(Romania) C Cristea (Romania) R Dragomir	6	6^{7}	6
(Sweden) Å Carlsson (France) É Loit	6	6
Q	(Greece) E Daniilidou (France) S Foretz	3	3
4	(Slovakia) K Habšudová (Russia) E Likhovtseva	3	2
(Croatia) J Kostanić (Slovenia) T Pisnik	6	6
(Netherlands) K Boogert (Netherlands) M Oremans	1	6	6
(Canada) S Jeyaseelan (Switzerland) P Schnyder	6	3	1
(France) A Cocheteux (France) C Dhenin	3	1
WC	(France) N Dechy (Bulgaria) M Maleeva	6	6
(Germany) A Huber (Hungary) K Marosi	4	6^{4}
3	(France) J Halard-Decugis (France) S Testud	6	7^{7}
(France) AG Sidot (Belgium) D Van Roost
(Australia) C Barclay (Canada) V Webb	w/o
(Austria) K Kschwendt (Federal Republic of Yugoslavia) S Načuk	6	4	4
2	(Romania) I Spîrlea (Netherlands) C Vis	4	6	6

Quarterfinals
(Romania) C Cristea (Romania) R Dragomir	6	5	2
(Sweden) Å Carlsson (France) É Loit	1	7	6
(Croatia) J Kostanić (Slovenia) T Pisnik	6	3	3
(Netherlands) K Boogert (Netherlands) M Oremans	3	6	6
WC	(France) N Dechy (Bulgaria) M Maleeva	2	0
3	(France) J Halard-Decugis (France) S Testud	6	6
(Australia) C Barclay (Canada) V Webb	3	4
2	(Romania) I Spîrlea (Netherlands) C Vis	6	6

Semifinals
(Sweden) Å Carlsson (France) É Loit	6	7^{7}
(Netherlands) K Boogert (Netherlands) M Oremans	3	6^{3}
3	(France) J Halard-Decugis (France) S Testud	6	3	6
2	(Romania) I Spîrlea (Netherlands) C Vis	3	6	2

Final
(Sweden) Å Carlsson (France) É Loit	6	3	4
3	(France) J Halard-Decugis (France) S Testud	3	6	6
