= 2001 Open Gaz de France – Singles =

Singles
- 2001 Open Gaz de France

Final
- Champion: (France) Amélie Mauresmo
- Runner-up: (Germany) Anke Huber
- Score: 7–6^{(7–2)}, 6–1

Details
- Draw: 28
- Seeds: 8

Events
Singles	Doubles
← 2000 ·	Open Gaz de France	· 2002 →

The 2001 Open Gatz de France Singles was the singles portion of the 2001 Open Gaz de France. Nathalie Tauziat was the defending champion but lost in the semifinals to Amélie Mauresmo.

Mauresmo won in the final 7–6^{(7–2)}, 6–1 against Anke Huber.

== Seeds ==
A champion seed is indicated in bold text while text in italics indicates the round in which that seed was eliminated. The top four seeds received a bye to the second round.

1. (France) Mary Pierce (second round)
2. (Russia) Anna Kournikova (quarterfinals)
3. (France) Nathalie Tauziat (semifinals)
4. (Russia) Elena Dementieva (second round)
5. (France) Sandrine Testud (first round)
6. (Germany) Anke Huber (final)
7. (United States) Amy Frazier (quarterfinals)
8. (France) **Amélie Mauresmo (champion)**

== Draw ==
=== Key ===
- Q = Qualifier
- WC = Wild card
- LL = Lucky loser
- Alt = Alternate
- SE = Special exempt
- PR = Protected ranking
- ITF = ITF entry
- JE = Junior exempt
- w/o = Walkover
- r = Retired
- d = Defaulted
- SR = Special ranking

=== Final ===
Final
6	(Germany) Anke Huber	6^{2}	1
8	(France) **Amélie Mauresmo**	**7^{7}**	**6**

=== Top half ===
First round
(Luxembourg) **A Kremer**	4	**6**	**6**
Q	(Germany) A Glass	**6**	4	1
(Czech Republic) K Hrdličková	2	1
(Romania) **R Dragomir**	**6**	**6**
(Canada) S Jeyaseelan	1	3
6	(Germany) **A Huber**	**6**	**6**
(Russia) E Likhovtseva	1	1
(Bulgaria) **M Maleeva**	**6**	**6**
Q	(Czech Republic) **D Chládková**	**6**	**6**
Q	(Spain) A Medina Garrigues	2	3
(United States) **M Shaughnessy**	**7^{7}**	4	**6**
5	(France) S Testud	6^{4}	**6**	3

Second round
WC/1	(France) M Pierce	3	3
(Luxembourg) **A Kremer**	**6**	**6**
(Romania) R Dragomir	2	4
6	(Germany) **A Huber**	**6**	**6**
4	(Russia) E Dementieva	**6**	0	3
(Bulgaria) **M Maleeva**	2	**6**	**6**
Q	(Czech Republic) D Chládková	5	3
(United States) **M Shaughnessy**	**7**	**6**

Quarterfinals
(Luxembourg) A Kremer	2	**7^{7}**	5
6	(Germany) **A Huber**	**6**	6^{5}	**7**
(Bulgaria) **M Maleeva**	4	**6**	**6**
(United States) M Shaughnessy	**6**	2	4

Semifinals
6	(Germany) **A Huber**	**6**	**7**
(Bulgaria) M Maleeva	4	5

=== Bottom half ===
First round
7	(United States) **A Frazier**	**6**	**7**
(Israel) A Smashnova	2	5
(Switzerland) P Schnyder	**7**	5	2
(France) **A-G Sidot**	5	**7**	**6**
(Croatia) S Talaja	2	2
(France) **N Dechy**	**6**	**6**
8	(France) **A Mauresmo**	**6**	**6**
(Russia) T Panova	4	2
(Spain) **M Serna**	**6**	**6**
WC	(Croatia) I Majoli	4	2
Q	(Czech Republic) **S Kleinová**	3	**6**	**6**
WC	(France) É Loit	**6**	4	4

Second round
7	(United States) **A Frazier**	1	**6**	**6**
(France) A-G Sidot	**6**	1	2
(France) N Dechy	**6**	4	5
3	(France) **N Tauziat**	4	**6**	**7**
8	(France) **A Mauresmo**	4	**6**	**6**
(Spain) M Serna	**6**	3	4
Q	(Czech Republic) S Kleinová	0	3
2	(Russia) **A Kournikova**	**6**	**6**

Quarterfinals
7	(United States) A Frazier	0	2
3	(France) **N Tauziat**	**6**	**6**
8	(France) **A Mauresmo**	2	**7^{7}**	**6**
2	(Russia) A Kournikova	**6**	6^{4}	1

Semifinals
3	(France) N Tauziat	2	1
8	(France) **A Mauresmo**	**6**	**6**
