= 2000 Open Gaz de France =

- Date: 7–13 February
- Edition: 8th
- Category: Tier II
- Draw: 28S / 16D
- Prize money: $535,000
- Surface: Carpet / indoor
- Location: Paris, France
- Venue: Stade Pierre de Coubertin

Champions

Singles
- (France) Nathalie Tauziat

Doubles
- (France) Julie Halard-Decugis (France) Sandrine Testud
← 1999 ·	Open Gaz de France	· 2001 →

The 2000 Open Gaz de France was a women's tennis tournament played on indoor carpet courts at the Stade Pierre de Coubertin in Paris, France and was part of Tier II of the 2000 WTA Tour. It was the eighth edition of the tournament and ran from 7 February until 13 February 2000. Second-seeded Nathalie Tauziat won the singles title and earned $87,000 first-prize money.

== Finals ==
=== Singles ===
(France) Nathalie Tauziat defeated (United States) Serena Williams 7–6^{(7–2)}, 6–1

- It was Tauziat's only singles title of the year and the 7th of her career.

=== Doubles ===
(France) Julie Halard-Decugis / (France) Sandrine Testud defeated (Sweden) Åsa Carlsson / (France) Émilie Loit 3–6, 6–3, 6–4
