= Laurence Andretto =

French tennis player

- Full name: Laurence Andretto
- Country (sports): France
- Born: 14 May 1973 (age 51); Revin, France
- Height: 168 cm (5 ft 6 in)
- Retired: 2002
- Plays: Right-handed
- Prize money: $215,752

Singles
- Career record: 189-193
- Career titles: 0 WTA, 6 ITF
- Highest ranking: No. 132 (1 March 1999)

Grand Slam singles results
- Australian Open: 1R (2001)
- French Open: 2R (1998, 2001)

Doubles
- Career record: 15-28
- Highest ranking: No. 338 (6 December 1999)

Laurence Andretto (born 14 May 1973) is a former professional tennis player from France.

== Biography ==
Andretto was born in the city of Revin in the Ardennes, near the Belgian border, the daughter of parents who were both teachers.

A right-handed player, she competed in the main draw of the French Open every year from 1997 to 2002. On two occasions she reached the second round, the first time in the 1998 edition when she overcame then world number 33 María Vento-Kabchi, then again in 2001 against the same opponent. She was a regular competitor in the qualifying draws of grand slam tournaments and made it into the 2001 Australian Open, where she lost in the first round to 16th seed Amy Frazier.

Her WTA main draw appearances included the 2000 Paris Indoor, where she had a win in qualifying over Elena Dementieva.

She reached a highest ranking of 132 in the world and won six singles titles on the ITF circuit.

== ITF Circuit finals ==
=== Singles (6–2) ===
Legend
$100,000 tournaments
$75,000 tournaments
$50,000 tournaments
$25,000 tournaments
$10,000 tournaments

Result	No.	Date	Tournament	Surface	Opponent	Score
Win	1.	5 October 1992	Dublin, Ireland	Clay	(Netherlands) Gaby Coorengel	1–6, 6–3, 6–3
Win	2.	15 March 1993	Reims, France	Clay	(Italy) Marzia Grossi	6–1, 6–2
Win	3.	6 May 1996	Santander, Spain	Clay	(Spain) Elena Salvador	6–2, 4–6, 7–6
Loss	4.	3 November 1996	Stockholm, Sweden	Hard	(Czech Republic) Jana Pospíšilová	4–6, 6–1, 2–6
Win	5.	16 March 1998	Reims, France	Clay	(Slovakia) Zuzana Váleková	6–2, 6–1
Win	6.	17 October 1999	Welwyn, United Kingdom	Hard (i)	(Spain) Paula Hermida	6–0, 6–3
Loss	7.	22 April 2001	Gelos, France	Clay	(France) Céline Beigbeder	2–6, 2–6
Win	8.	11 August 2002	Rimini, Italy	Clay	(Croatia) Karolina Šprem	7–5, 6–4
