= 2008 Pilot Pen Tennis =

Combined men's and women's tennis tournament

- Date: August 15–23
- Edition: 40th
- Surface: Hard / outdoor
- Location: New Haven, United States
- Venue: Cullman-Heyman Tennis Center

Champions

Men's singles
- (Croatia) Marin Čilić

Women's singles
- (Denmark) Caroline Wozniacki

Men's doubles
- (Brazil) Marcelo Melo / (Brazil) André Sá

Women's doubles
- (Czech Republic) Květa Peschke / (United States) Lisa Raymond
← 2007 ·	Pilot Pen Tennis	· 2009 →

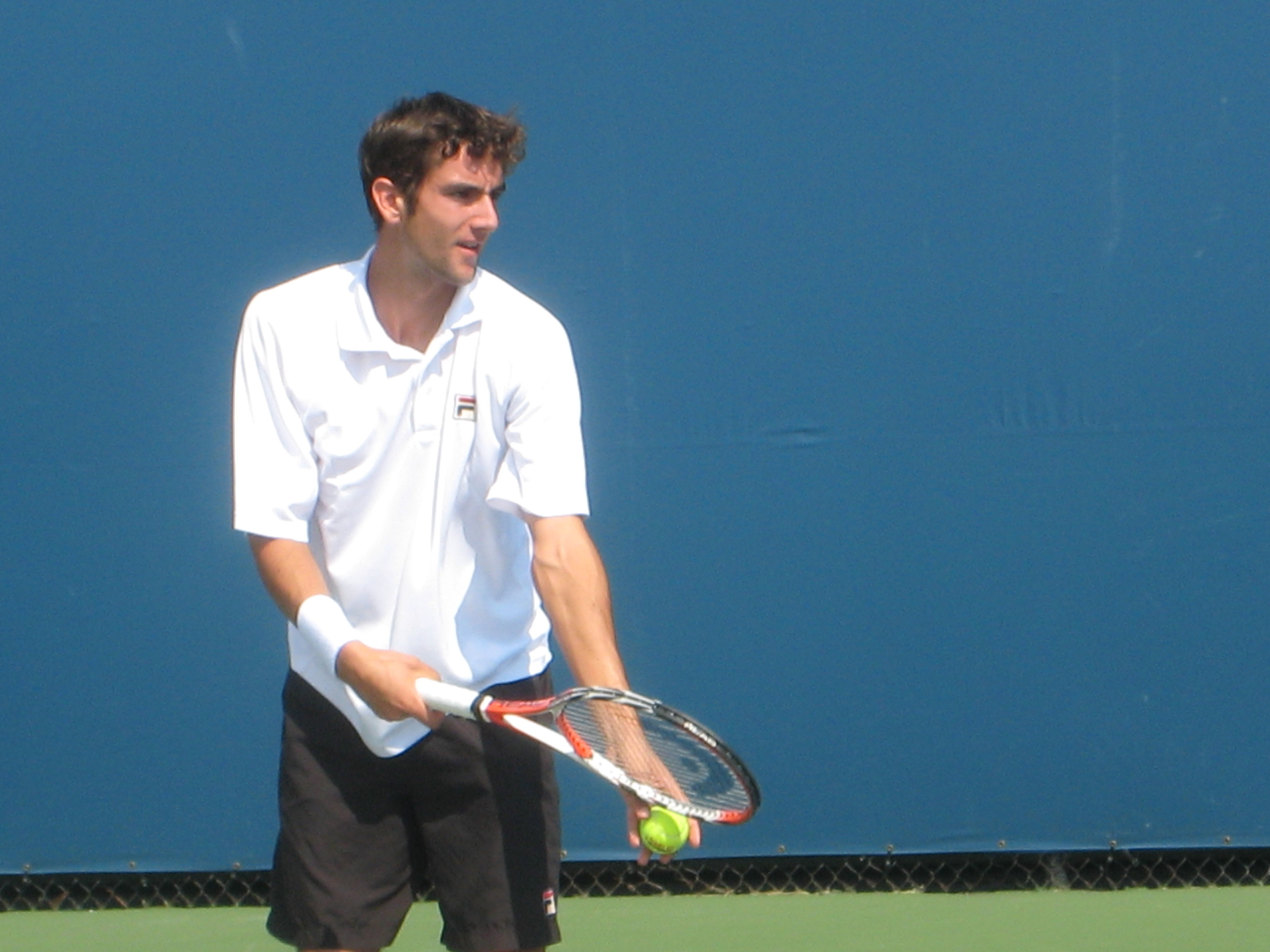
Men's singles champion Marin Čilić

The 2008 Pilot Pen Tennis was a combined men's and women's tennis tournament played on outdoor hard courts. It was the 40th edition of the Pilot Pen Tennis, and was part of the International Series of the 2008 ATP Tour, and of the Tier II Series of the 2008 WTA Tour. It took place at the Cullman-Heyman Tennis Center in New Haven, United States, from August 15 through August 23, 2008.

The men's field was headlined by ATP No. 13, Nottingham runner-up and Umag champion Fernando Verdasco, Cincinnati Masters semifinalist and Nottingham titlist Ivo Karlović, and winner of back-to-back titles in Stuttgart, Kitzbühel, Los Angeles and Washington Juan Martín del Potro. Other top seeds are Gstaad and Umag finalist Igor Andreev, Viña del Mar and Pörtschach runner-up Juan Mónaco, Marin Čilić, Andreas Seppi and Mardy Fish.

The women's draw was led by WTA No. 10, Rome Tier I semifinalist and Paris champion Anna Chakvetadze, Australian Open semifinalist and Indian Wells Tier I quarterfinalist Daniela Hantuchová, and Paris, Eastbourne and Montreal semifinalist, Stanford finalist Marion Bartoli. Also competing are Paris finalist Ágnes Szávay, Bangalore runner-up Patty Schnyder, Flavia Pennetta, Alizé Cornet and Dominika Cibulková.

== Finals ==
=== Men's singles ===
(Croatia) Marin Čilić defeated (United States) Mardy Fish, 6–4, 4–6, 6–2

- It was Marin Čilić's 1st career title.

=== Women's singles ===
(Denmark) Caroline Wozniacki defeated (Russia) Anna Chakvetadze, 3–6, 6–4, 6–1

- It was Caroline Wozniacki's 2nd title of the year, and overall.

=== Men's doubles ===
(Brazil) Marcelo Melo / (Brazil) André Sá defeated (India) Mahesh Bhupathi / (The Bahamas) Mark Knowles, 7–5, 6–2

=== Women's doubles ===
(Czech Republic) Květa Peschke / (United States) Lisa Raymond defeated (Romania) Sorana Cîrstea / (Romania) Monica Niculescu, 4–6, 7–5, [10–7]
