= 2007 Open Gaz de France – Singles =

Singles
- 2007 Open Gaz de France

Final
- Champion: (Russia) Nadia Petrova
- Runner-up: (Czech Republic) Lucie Šafářová
- Score: 4–6, 6–1, 6–4

Details
- Draw: 28
- Seeds: 8

Events
Singles	Doubles
← 2006 ·	Open Gaz de France	· 2008 →

The Women's Singles tournament of the 2007 Open Gaz de France tennis championships took place in Paris, France, between 5 February and 11 February 2007. 27 players from 15 countries competed in the 5-round tournament, with the three highest-seed players joining in the second round of competition. The final winner was Nadia Petrova of Russia, who defeated Lucie Šafářová of the Czech Republic.

== Prelude ==
- 5 February 2007 – Elena Bovina withdrew from the Open Gaz de France due to a nerve entrapment. In the single's draw she was replaced by the lucky loser, Agnieszka Radwańska, and in the doubles draw she and her partner, Anna Chakvetadze, were replaced by the alternate team of Stéphanie Foretz and Camille Pin.
- 27 January 2007 – Kim Clijsters withdrew from the Open Gaz de France to allow for one week's rest in order to treat hip pain.

== Seeds ==
The seeded players are listed below. Players are listed with the round in which they exited.

1. (Belgium) Justine Henin (semifinals)
2. (France) Amélie Mauresmo (semifinals)
3. (Russia) Svetlana Kuznetsova (quarterfinals)
4. (Russia) Nadia Petrova (champion)
5. (Czech Republic) Nicole Vaidišová (second round)
6. (Switzerland) Patty Schnyder (first round)
7. (Russia) Dinara Safina (quarterfinals)
8. (Russia) Anna Chakvetadze (quarterfinals)

== Draw ==
=== Key ===
- Q = Qualifier
- WC = Wild card
- LL = Lucky loser

=== Finals ===
Semifinals
1	(Belgium) Justine Henin	6^{5}	4
(Czech Republic) Lucie Šafářová	7^{7}	6
4	(Russia) Nadia Petrova	5	6	7^{9}
2	(France) Amélie Mauresmo	7	4	6^{7}

Finals
(Czech Republic) Lucie Šafářová	6	1	4
4	(Russia) Nadia Petrova	4	6	6

=== Top half ===
First round
WC	(France) É Loit	7^{9}	6^{1}	6
(Greece) E Daniilidou	6^{7}	7^{7}	4
(France) T Golovin	6	6
WC	(France) A Cornet	2	2
Q	(Russia) E Bychkova	3	6	6
6	(Switzerland) P Schnyder	6	4	3
(Slovenia) K Srebotnik	6	6
Q	(France) S Cohen-Aloro	1	4
(Czech Republic) L Šafářová	6	6^{5}	6
Q	(Bulgaria) T Pironkova	3	7^{7}	3
(France) A Rezaï	2	1
5	(Czech Republic) N Vaidišová	6	6

Second round
1	(Belgium) J Henin	3	6	6
WC	(France) É Loit	6	2	2
(France) T Golovin	6	6
Q	(Russia) E Bychkova	4	4
3	(Russia) S Kuznetsova	6^{4}	6	7^{7}
(Slovenia) K Srebotnik	7^{7}	4	6^{4}
(Czech Republic) L Šafářová	6	6
5	(Czech Republic) N Vaidišová	4	2

Quarterfinals
1	(Belgium) J Henin	6	3	6
(France) T Golovin	2	6	3
3	(Russia) S Kuznetsova	3	4
(Czech Republic) L Šafářová	6	6

Semifinals
1	(Belgium) J Henin	6^{5}	4
(Czech Republic) L Šafářová	7^{7}	6

=== Bottom half ===
First round
7	(Russia) D Safina	6	7
(Netherlands) M Krajicek	4	5
WC	(France) C Pin	6	6
Q	(Hungary) Á Szávay	4	0
(Germany) M Müller	6	6
LL	(Poland) A Radwańska	1	0
8	(Russia) A Chakvetadze	6	6
(Russia) O Puchkova	2	0
(Spain) A Medina Garrigues	6	7
(France) S Brémond	2	5
(France) N Dechy	6	6
(Italy) T Garbin	2	3

Second round
7	(Russia) D Safina	2	6	7^{7}
WC	(France) C Pin	6	2	6^{5}
(Germany) M Müller	1	2
4	(Russia) N Petrova	6	6
8	(Russia) A Chakvetadze	4	6	6
(Spain) A Medina Garrigues	6	4	4
(France) N Dechy	3	2
2	(France) A Mauresmo	6	6

Quarterfinals
7	(Russia) D Safina	3	2
4	(Russia) N Petrova	6	6
8	(Russia) A Chakvetadze	6^{5}	5
2	(France) A Mauresmo	7^{7}	7

Semifinals
4	(Russia) N Petrova	5	6	7^{9}
2	(France) A Mauresmo	7	4	6^{7}

== Notes ==
- The winner will receive $88,265 and 275 ranking points.
- The runner-up will receive $47,125 and 190 ranking points.
- The last direct acceptance was Lucie Šafárová (ranked 42nd).
- The Players' Representatives were Amélie Mauresmo and Nicole Vaidišová.
