= 2007 Open Gaz de France – Doubles =

Doubles
- 2007 Open Gaz de France

Final
- Champion: (Zimbabwe) Cara Black (South Africa) Liezel Huber
- Runner-up: (Czech Republic) Gabriela Navrátilová (Czech Republic) Vladimíra Uhlířová
- Score: 6–2, 6–0

Events
Singles	Doubles
← 2006 ·	Open Gaz de France	· 2008 →

Émilie Loit and Květa Peschke were the defending champions, but they did not compete together that year.

Loit partnering Nathalie Dechy lost in the Quarterfinals, and Peschke partnering Janette Husárová were eliminated in the first round.

== Seeds ==
1. (Zimbabwe) Cara Black
  (South Africa) Liezel Huber (champions)
2. (Russia) Dinara Safina
  (Slovenia) Katarina Srebotnik (quarterfinals, retired due to Safina's left hamstring strain)
3. (Slovakia) Janette Husárová
  (Czech Republic) Květa Peschke (first round)
4. (France) Nathalie Dechy
  (France) Émilie Loit (quarterfinals)

== Draw ==
=== Key ===
- Q = Qualifier
- WC = Wild card
- LL = Lucky loser
- Alt = Alternate
- ITF = ITF entry
- PR = Protected ranking
- SR = Special ranking
- SE = Special exempt
- JE = Junior exempt
- JR = Junior Accelerator Programme entrant
- CO = College Accelerator Programme entrant
- NG = Next Gen Accelerator Program entrant
- w/o = Walkover
- r = Retired
- d = Defaulted

=== Draw ===
First round
1	(Zimbabwe) C Black (South Africa) L Huber	6	7
WC	(France) V Razzano (France) A Rezaï	1	5
(France) S Brémond (France) S Cohen-Aloro	6	7^{7}
(Ukraine) Y Beygelzimer (Hungary) Á Szávay	4	6^{5}
3	(Slovakia) J Husárová (Czech Republic) K Peschke	6	5	3
(Greece) E Daniilidou (Germany) J Wöhr	3	7	6
(Poland) K Jans (Czech Republic) R Voráčová	6	6
(Switzerland) E Gagliardi (Tunisia) S Sfar	2	2
(Italy) T Garbin (Netherlands) M Krajicek	3	0
(Russia) S Kuznetsova (Russia) N Petrova	6	6
Alt	(France) S Foretz (France) C Pin	4	5
4	(France) N Dechy (France) É Loit	6	7
(Czech Republic) G Navrátilová (Czech Republic) V Uhlířová	6	6
(Romania) A Ehritt-Vanc (Germany) M Müller	2	2
(Czech Republic) E Birnerová (Spain) A Medina Garrigues	2	4
2	(Russia) D Safina (Slovenia) K Srebotnik	6	6

Quarterfinals
1	(Zimbabwe) C Black (South Africa) L Huber	6	6
(France) S Brémond (France) S Cohen-Aloro	3	1
(Greece) E Daniilidou (Germany) J Wöhr	4	5
(Poland) K Jans (Czech Republic) R Voráčová	6	7
(Russia) S Kuznetsova (Russia) N Petrova	6^{3}	6	6
4	(France) N Dechy (France) É Loit	7^{7}	2	4
(Czech Republic) G Navrátilová (Czech Republic) V Uhlířová	w/o
2	(Russia) D Safina (Slovenia) K Srebotnik

Semifinals
1	(Zimbabwe) C Black (South Africa) L Huber	6	6
(Poland) K Jans (Czech Republic) R Voráčová	4	0
(Russia) S Kuznetsova (Russia) N Petrova
(Czech Republic) G Navrátilová (Czech Republic) V Uhlířová	w/o

Finals
1	(Zimbabwe) C Black (South Africa) L Huber	6	6
(Czech Republic) G Navrátilová (Czech Republic) V Uhlířová	2	0

== Notes ==
- The winners will receive $27,730 and 275 ranking points.
- The runners-up will receive $14,900 and 190 ranking points.
- The last direct acceptance team was Emmanuelle Gagliardi/Selima Sfar (combined ranking of 221st).
- The player representative was Aravane Rezaï.
