= Szávay =

Szávay is a Hungarian surname. Notable people with the surname include:

- Ágnes Szávay (born 1988), Hungarian tennis player
- Blanka Szávay (born 1993), Hungarian tennis player, sister of Ágnes
