= 2010 GDF Suez Grand Prix – Doubles =

Doubles
- 2010 GDF Suez Grand Prix

Final
- Champion: (Switzerland) Timea Bacsinszky (Italy) Tathiana Garbin
- Runner-up: (Romania) Sorana Cîrstea (Spain) Anabel Medina Garrigues
- Score: 6–3, 6–3

Details
- Draw: 16
- Seeds: 4

Events
Singles	Doubles
- GDF Suez Grand Prix

Alisa Kleybanova and Monica Niculescu were the defending champions, but Niculsecu chose not to participate that year.
Kleybanova chose to compete with Alexandra Dulgheru. However, they lost to Sorana Cîrstea and Anabel Medina Garrigues in the semifinals.
Timea Bacsinszky and Tathiana Garbin became the new champions, after they won 6–3, 6–3, against Cîrstea and Medina Garrigues in the finals.

== Seeds ==
1. (Romania) Sorana Cîrstea / (Spain) Anabel Medina Garrigues (final)
2. (Switzerland) Timea Bacsinszky / (Italy) Tathiana Garbin (champions)
3. (Romania) Alexandra Dulgheru / (Russia) Alisa Kleybanova (semifinals)
4. (Ukraine) Mariya Koryttseva / (Romania) Ioana Raluca Olaru (quarterfinals)

== Draw ==
Key

- Q = Qualifier
- WC = Wild card
- LL = Lucky loser
- Alt = Alternate
- ITF = ITF entry
- PR = Protected ranking
- SR = Special ranking
- SE = Special exempt
- JE = Junior exempt
- JR = Junior Accelerator Programme entrant
- CO = College Accelerator Programme entrant
- NG = Next Gen Accelerator Program entrant
- w/o = Walkover
- r = Retired
- d = Defaulted

=== Main draw ===
First round
1	(Romania) S Cîrstea (Spain) A Medina Garrigues	6	7
(France) A Cornet (Austria) Y Meusburger	2	5
(Austria) S Klemenschits (Slovenia) A Klepač	7	6
(Croatia) J Kostanić Tošić (Romania) Á Szatmári	5	0
3	(Romania) A Dulgheru (Russia) A Kleybanova	2	7	[10]
(Brazil) MF Alves (Argentina) M Irigoyen	6	6^{4}	[5]
WC	(Hungary) K Halász (Hungary) L Pump	6^{3}	1
WC	(Switzerland) V Golubic (Hungary) B Szávay	7	6
(Switzerland) P Schnyder (Hungary) Á Szávay	6^{4}	6	[6]
(Belarus) D Kustova (Ukraine) L Tsurenko	7	3	[10]
(Czech Republic) H Birnerová (Kazakhstan) S Karatantcheva	2	1
4	(Ukraine) M Koryttseva (Romania) IR Olaru	6	6
(Russia) A Chakvetadze (Slovenia) P Hercog	6	3	[10]
(Russia) A Pivovarova (Belarus) A Yakimova	4	6	[8]
(Greece) E Daniilidou (Czech Republic) E Hrdinová	3	5
2	(Switzerland) T Bacsinszky (Italy) T Garbin	6	7

Quarterfinals
1	(Romania) S Cîrstea (Spain) A Medina Garrigues	2	6	[10]
(Austria) S Klemenschits (Slovenia) A Klepač	6	3	[7]
3	(Romania) A Dulgheru (Russia) A Kleybanova	6	6
WC	(Switzerland) V Golubic (Hungary) B Szávay	3	2
(Belarus) D Kustova (Ukraine) L Tsurenko	2	7	[10]
4	(Ukraine) M Koryttseva (Romania) IR Olaru	6	5	[6]
(Russia) A Chakvetadze (Slovenia) P Hercog	3	7	[7]
2	(Switzerland) T Bacsinszky (Italy) T Garbin	6	5	[10]

Semifinals
1	(Romania) S Cîrstea (Spain) A Medina Garrigues	6	6
3	(Romania) A Dulgheru (Russia) A Kleybanova	2	3
(Belarus) D Kustova (Ukraine) L Tsurenko	4	6	[8]
2	(Switzerland) T Bacsinszky (Italy) T Garbin	6	4	[10]

Final
1	(Romania) S Cîrstea (Spain) A Medina Garrigues	3	3
2	(Switzerland) T Bacsinszky (Italy) T Garbin	6	6
