= 2009 GDF SUEZ Grand Prix – Doubles =

Doubles
- 2009 GDF SUEZ Grand Prix

Final
- Champion: (Russia) Alisa Kleybanova (Romania) Monica Niculescu
- Runner-up: (Ukraine) Alona Bondarenko (Ukraine) Kateryna Bondarenko
- Score: 6–4, 7–6^{(7–5)}

Details
- Draw: 16
- Seeds: 4

Events
| Singles | Doubles |
- GDF SUEZ Grand Prix

Alizé Cornet and Janette Husárová were the defending champions, but Husárová chose not to participate this year.
Cornet partnered with Eleni Daniilidou, but lost in the first round to Sharon Fichman and Katalin Marosi.

Alisa Kleybanova and Monica Niculescu won in the final 6–4, 7–6^{(7–5)} against Alona Bondarenko and Kateryna Bondarenko.

== Seeds ==
1. (Russia) Alisa Kleybanova / (Romania) Monica Niculescu (champions)
2. (Ukraine) Alona Bondarenko / (Ukraine) Kateryna Bondarenko (final)
3. (Czech Republic) Lucie Šafářová / (Kazakhstan) Galina Voskoboeva (quarterfinals; withdrew)
4. (Romania) Edina Gallovits / (Israel) Shahar Pe'er (quarterfinals)

== Draw ==
Key

- Q = Qualifier
- WC = Wild card
- LL = Lucky loser
- Alt = Alternate
- ITF = ITF entry
- PR = Protected ranking
- SR = Special ranking
- SE = Special exempt
- JE = Junior exempt
- JR = Junior Accelerator Programme entrant
- CO = College Accelerator Programme entrant
- NG = Next Gen Accelerator Program entrant
- w/o = Walkover
- r = Retired
- d = Defaulted

First round
1 | (Russia) A Kleybanova (Romania) M Niculescu | 6 | 6
(Russia) E Ivanova (Russia) A Lapushchenkova | 2 | 0
(Slovenia) P Hercog (Czech Republic) V Uhlířová | 7 | 1 | [9]
(Spain) L Domínguez Lino (Italy) S Errani | 5 | 6 | [11]
4 | (Romania) E Gallovits (Israel) S Pe'er | 6 | 7
(Hungary) A Kapros (Austria) S Klemenschits | 2 | 6^{4}
WC | (Hungary) B Szávay (Hungary) Á Szávay | 1 | 3
(Ukraine) M Koryttseva (Romania) IR Olaru | 6 | 6
(Canada) S Fichman (Hungary) K Marosi | 6 | 6
(France) A Cornet (Greece) E Daniilidou | 2 | 2
(Romania) Á Szatmári (Slovakia) L Tvarošková | 4 | 4
3 | (Czech Republic) L Šafářová (Kazakhstan) G Voskoboeva | 6 | 6
(Colombia) C Castaño (Russia) A Jidkova | 6 | 1 | [4]
(Austria) P Mayr (Bulgaria) T Pironkova | 4 | 6 | [10]
(Georgia (country)) M Chakhnashvili (Ukraine) V Kapshay | 2 | 6 | [3]
2 | (Ukraine) A Bondarenko (Ukraine) K Bondarenko | 6 | 4 | [10]

Quarterfinals
1 | (Russia) A Kleybanova (Romania) M Niculescu | 6 | 6
(Spain) L Domínguez Lino (Italy) S Errani | 2 | 0
4 | (Romania) E Gallovits (Israel) S Pe'er | 6 | 4 | [2]
(Ukraine) M Koryttseva (Romania) IR Olaru | 2 | 6 | [10]
(Canada) S Fichman (Hungary) K Marosi | w/o
3 | (Czech Republic) L Šafářová (Kazakhstan) G Voskoboeva
(Austria) P Mayr (Bulgaria) T Pironkova | 1 | 6 | [6]
2 | (Ukraine) A Bondarenko (Ukraine) K Bondarenko | 6 | 1 | [10]

Semifinals
1 | (Russia) A Kleybanova (Romania) M Niculescu | 7 | 6^{3} | [10]
(Ukraine) M Koryttseva (Romania) IR Olaru | 5 | 7 | [8]
(Canada) S Fichman (Hungary) K Marosi | 1 | 1
2 | (Ukraine) A Bondarenko (Ukraine) K Bondarenko | 6 | 6

Final
1 | (Russia) A Kleybanova (Romania) M Niculescu | 6 | 7
2 | (Ukraine) A Bondarenko (Ukraine) K Bondarenko | 4 | 6^{5}
