= Blanka Szávay =

Hungarian tennis player

- Country (sports): Hungary
- Born: 24 October 1993 (age 31); Kiskunhalas, Hungary
- Turned pro: 2009
- Plays: Right-handed
- Prize money: $4,008

Singles
- Career record: 6–10
- Career titles: 0
- Highest ranking: No. 995 (8 November 2010)

Doubles
- Career record: 8–11
- Career titles: 1 ITF
- Highest ranking: No. 471 (25 October 2010)

Blanka Szávay (Hungarian: Szávay Blanka; born 24 October 1993) is a Hungarian former tennis player. She is the younger sister of former professional tennis player Ágnes Szávay. Szávay who won one ITF Circuit doubles tournament in her career, made her first WTA Tour appearance at the 2009 GDF Suez Grand Prix, playing doubles partnering with her sister.

== Early life ==
Szávay was born to Terezia Szávay (née Dasko), a coach and a teacher, and Zsolt Szávay. She has two siblings, a sister Ágnes, who also was a professional tennis player, and a brother Levente. Blanka Szávay is fluent in Hungarian and English.

== Career ==
Szávay began playing at the junior circuit in 2007. Since then, she has won one singles and two doubles tournaments, with No. 142 as her highest combinated ranking so far. Szávay made her professional debut in 2009, at the WTA Tour event in Budapest. She played qualifications for the singles draw, but lost in the second round to Timea Bacsinszky 6–0, 6–1. Partnering with her sister Ágnes, she played in the doubles main draw of the Budapest Grand Prix, but they lost to Mariya Koryttseva and Raluca Olaru, 1–6, 3–6 in the first round. In 2010, Szávay won her first professional title, in doubles, at Durban, South Africa. She also played qualifications for 2010 GDF Suez Grand Prix, but lost in the first round.

== ITF finals ==
=== Doubles (1–0) ===
$25,000 tournaments
$10,000 tournaments

Outcome	No.	Date	Location	Surface	Partner	Opponents	Score
Winner	1.	28 May 2010	Durban, South Africa	Hard	(Austria) Nicole Rottmann	(India) Sanaa Bhambri (India) Rushmi Chakravarthi	3–6, 7–5, [11–9]
