= 2008 Pilot Pen Tennis – Women's singles =

Women's singles
- 2008 Pilot Pen Tennis

Final
- Champion: (Denmark) Caroline Wozniacki
- Runner-up: (Russia) Anna Chakvetadze
- Score: 3–6, 6–4, 6–1

Details
- Draw: 28
- Seeds: 8

Events
| Singles | men | women |
| Doubles | men | women |
- Pilot Pen Tennis

Svetlana Kuznetsova was the defending champion, but chose not to participate that year.

Caroline Wozniacki won in the final 3–6, 6–4, 6–1, against Anna Chakvetadze.

== Seeds ==
The top four seeds received a bye into the second round.

1. (Russia) Anna Chakvetadze (final)
2. (Slovakia) Daniela Hantuchová (quarterfinals)
3. (France) Marion Bartoli (quarterfinals)
4. (Hungary) Ágnes Szávay (quarterfinals)
5. (Switzerland) Patty Schnyder (second round)
6. (Italy) Flavia Pennetta (second round)
7. (France) Alizé Cornet (semifinals)
8. (Slovakia) Dominika Cibulková (first round, retired due to a heat illness)

== Draw ==
Key

- Q = Qualifier
- WC = Wild card
- LL = Lucky loser
- Alt = Alternate
- ITF = ITF entry
- PR = Protected ranking
- SR = Special ranking
- SE = Special exempt
- JE = Junior exempt
- JR = Junior Accelerator Programme entrant
- CO = College Accelerator Programme entrant
- NG = Next Gen Accelerator Program entrant
- w/o = Walkover
- r = Retired
- d = Defaulted

=== Finals ===
Semifinals
1 | (Russia) Anna Chakvetadze | 6 | 3 | 6
(France) Amélie Mauresmo | 3 | 6 | 1
(Denmark) Caroline Wozniacki | 7 | 6
7 | (France) Alizé Cornet | 5 | 4

Final
1 | (Russia) Anna Chakvetadze | 6 | 4 | 1
(Denmark) Caroline Wozniacki | 3 | 6 | 6

=== Top half ===
First round
(Australia) C Dellacqua | 6 | 6
(France) V Razzano | 3 | 1
Q | (Russia) A Kudryavtseva | 6 | 3 | 5
(Romania) S Cîrstea | 4 | 6 | 7
(Argentina) G Dulko | 3 | 1
6 | (Italy) F Pennetta | 6 | 6
Q | (United States) M Cecil | 2 | 6 | 6^{1}
LL | (Italy) S Errani | 6 | 4 | 7
(Estonia) K Kanepi | 2 | 7 | 2
(France) A Mauresmo | 6 | 6^{3} | 6
WC | (United States) J Craybas | 4 | 6^{2}
5/WC | (Switzerland) P Schnyder | 6 | 7

Second round
1 | (Russia) A Chakvetadze | 6 | 6
(Australia) C Dellacqua | 4 | 4
(Romania) S Cîrstea | 3 | 6 | 6
6 | (Italy) F Pennetta | 6 | 4 | 3
4 | (Hungary) Á Szávay | 6 | 6^{3} | 6
LL | (Italy) S Errani | 4 | 7 | 4
(France) A Mauresmo | 6 | 3 | 7
5/WC | (Switzerland) P Schnyder | 4 | 6 | 6^{6}

Quarterfinals
1 | (Russia) A Chakvetadze | 6 | 6
(Romania) S Cîrstea | 3 | 3
4 | (Hungary) Á Szávay | 4 | 5
(France) A Mauresmo | 6 | 7

Semifinals
1 | (Russia) A Chakvetadze | 6 | 3 | 6
(France) A Mauresmo | 3 | 6 | 1

=== Bottom half ===
First round
8 | (Slovakia) D Cibulková | 6^{7} | 0 | r
(Denmark) C Wozniacki | 7 | 0
(Russia) M Kirilenko | 7 | 2 | 1
Q | (Romania) M Niculescu | 6^{7} | 6 | 6
WC | (United States) B Mattek | 6^{4} | 6 | 0
(Bulgaria) T Pironkova | 7 | 0 | 6
7 | (France) A Cornet | 6 | 7
(Czech Republic) N Vaidišová | 3 | 6^{8}
Q | (Spain) MJ Martínez Sánchez | 7 | 3 | 2
(Slovenia) K Srebotnik | 6^{4} | 6 | 6
(Belarus) O Govortsova | 6 | 6
(Russia) A Kleybanova | 0 | 2

Second round
(Denmark) C Wozniacki | 6 | 6
Q | (Romania) M Niculescu | 3 | 3
(Bulgaria) T Pironkova | 6 | 4 | 5
3 | (France) M Bartoli | 2 | 6 | 7
7 | (France) A Cornet | 7 | 4 | 6
(Slovenia) K Srebotnik | 6^{3} | 6 | 2
(Belarus) O Govortsova | 6 | 2 | 6^{4}
2 | (Slovakia) D Hantuchová | 3 | 6 | 7

Quarterfinals
(Denmark) C Wozniacki | 6 | 6
3 | (France) M Bartoli | 4 | 0
7 | (France) A Cornet | 3 | 6 | 6
2 | (Slovakia) D Hantuchová | 6 | 4 | 4

Semifinals
(Denmark) C Wozniacki | 7 | 6
7 | (France) A Cornet | 5 | 4
