= Ágnes Szávay career statistics =

Career finals
Discipline	Type	Won	Lost	Total	WR
Singles	Grand Slam	–	–	–	–
Singles	Summer Olympics	–	–	–	–
Singles	WTA Finals (Note: Formerly known as: Virginia Slims Championships (until 1995); WTA Tour Championships (until 2014))	–	–	–	–
Singles	WTA Elite (Note: Elite tier: WTA Tournament of Champions (2009–14); WTA Elite Trophy (2015–present))	–	–	–	–
Singles	WTA 1000 (Note: Formerly known as: Category 4 & 5 & 6 (until 1990); Tier I (until 2009); WTA Premier Mandatory and 5 (until 2021))	–	–	–	–
Singles	WTA 500 (Note: Formerly known as: Category 3 (until 1990); Tier II (until 2009); WTA Premier (until 2021))	1	2	3	0.33
Singles	WTA 250 (Note: Formerly known as: Category 1 & 2 (until 1990); Tier III & IV & V (until 2009); WTA International (until 2021))	4	0	4	1.00
Singles	Total	5	2	7	0.71
Doubles	Grand Slam	–	–	–	–
Doubles	Summer Olympics	–	–	–	–
Doubles	WTA Finals	–	–	–	–
Doubles	WTA Elite	–	–	–	–
Doubles	WTA 1000	–	–	–	–
Doubles	WTA 500	0	1	1	0.00
Doubles	WTA 250	2	5	7	0.29
Doubles	Total	2	6	8	0.25
Total		7	8	15	0.47

This is a list of the main career statistics of Hungarian tennis player Ágnes Szávay.

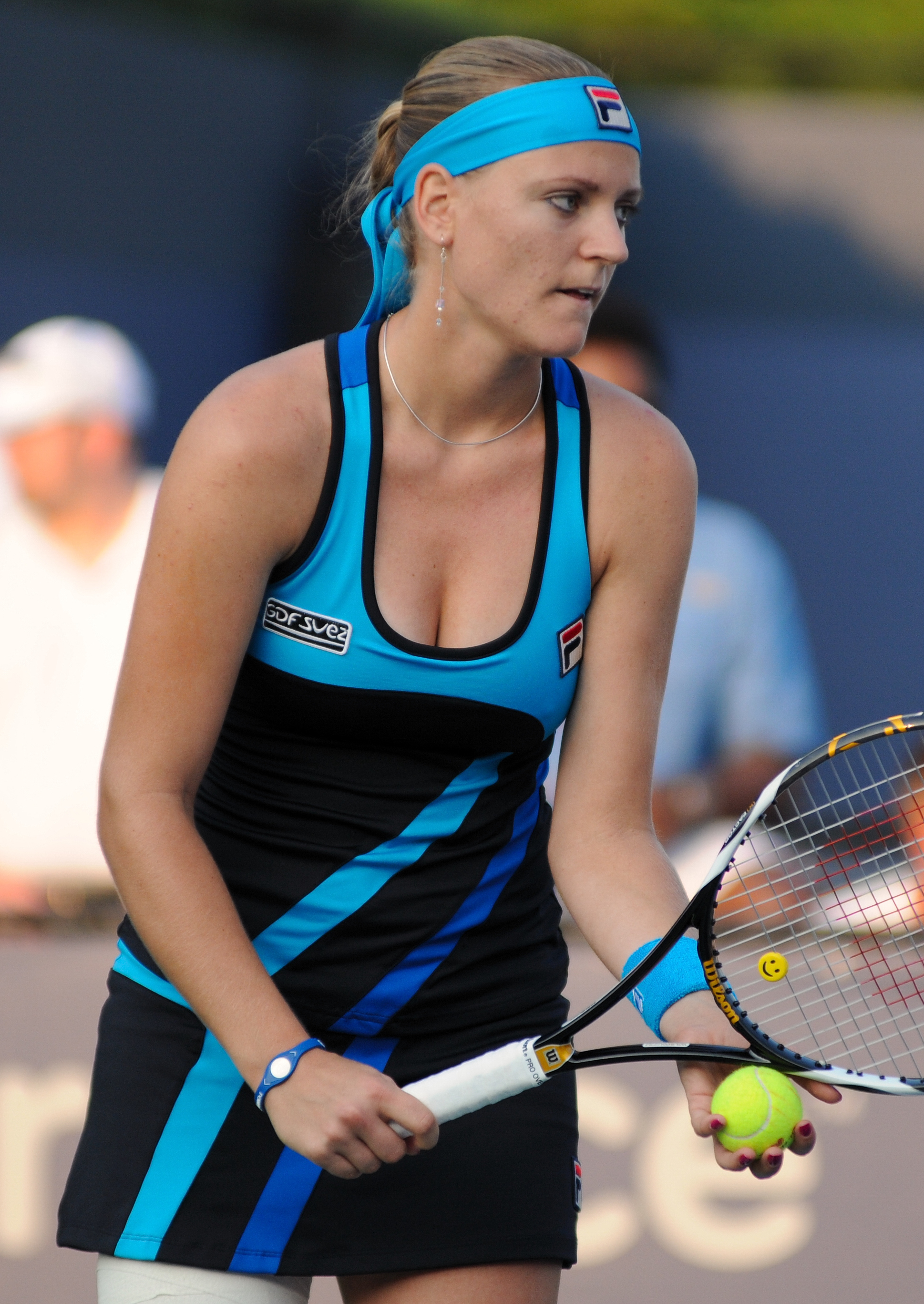
Szávayat the 2010 US Open.

== Performance timelines ==
Key
W	F	SF	QF	#R	RR	Q#	P#	DNQ	A	Z#	PO	G	S	B	NMS	NTI	P	NH

(W) winner; (F) finalist; (SF) semifinalist; (QF) quarterfinalist; (#R) rounds 4, 3, 2, 1; (RR) round-robin stage; (Q#) qualification round; (P#) preliminary round; (DNQ) did not qualify; (A) absent; (Z#) Davis/Fed Cup Zonal Group (with number indication) or (PO) play-off; (G) gold, (S) silver or (B) bronze Olympic/Paralympic medal; (NMS) not a Masters tournament; (NTI) not a Tier I tournament; (P) postponed; (NH) not held; (SR) strike rate (events won / competed); (W–L) win–loss record.
To avoid confusion and double counting, these charts are updated at the conclusion of a tournament or when the player's participation has ended.

Only main-draw results in WTA Tour, Grand Slam tournaments, Billie Jean King Cup (Fed Cup), Hopman Cup and Olympic Games are included in win–loss records.

=== Singles ===
Tournament	2005	2006	2007	2008	2009	2010	2011	2012	SR	W–L	Win%
Grand Slam tournaments
Australian Open	A	Q1	Q2	1R	1R	2R	A	A	0 / 3	1–3	25%
French Open	A	Q3	2R	3R	4R	2R	1R	A	0 / 5	7–5	58%
Wimbledon	A	A	2R	4R	1R	1R	A	A	0 / 4	4–4	50%
US Open	Q1	A	QF	2R	1R	2R	A	1R	0 / 5	6–5	55%
Win–loss	0–0	0–0	6–3	6–4	3–4	3–4	0–1	0–1	0 / 17	18–17	51%
National representation
Summer Olympics	NH			1R	NH			1R	0 / 2	0–2	0%
WTA 1000 + former^{†} tournaments
Dubai / Qatar Open (Note: The first Premier 5 event of the year has switched back and forth between the Dubai Tennis Championships and the Qatar Total Open since 2009. Dubai was classified as a Premier 5 event from 2009 to 2011 before being succeeded by Doha for the 2012–2014 period. In 2015, Dubai regained its Premier 5 status while Doha was demoted to Premier status. The Premier 5 tournaments were reclassified as WTA 1000 tournaments in 2021.)	NMS			1R	1R	A	A	A	0 / 2	0–2	0%
Indian Wells Open	A	A	A	A	4R	3R	2R	A	0 / 3	4–3	57%
Miami Open	A	A	A	2R	4R	3R	2R	A	0 / 4	4–4	50%
Berlin / Madrid Open (Note: In 2009, the Berlin Open was replaced by the Madrid Open. The Premier Mandatory tournaments were reclassified as WTA 1000 tournaments in 2021.)	A	A	A	QF	QF	1R	2R (Note: Withdraw during the tournament. Not counted as a loss.)	A	0 / 4	7–3	70%
Italian Open	A	A	A	2R	1R	A	A	A	0 / 2	1–2	33%
Canadian Open	A	A	A	A	2R	3R	A	A	0 / 2	3–2	60%
Cincinnati Open	NMS				2R	A	A	A	0 / 1	1–1	50%
Pan Pacific Open	A	A	A	1R	1R	1R	A	A	0 / 3	0–3	0%
China Open	NMS				1R	1R	A	A	0 / 2	0–2	0%
Charleston Open^{†}	A	A	A	QF	NMS				0 / 1	3–1	75%
Zurich Open^{†}	Q3	A	A	NH/NMS					0 / 0	0–0	–
Win–loss	0–0	0–0	0–0	7–6	9–9	4–6	3–2	0–0	0 / 24	23–23	50%
Career statistics
	2005	2006	2007	2008	2009	2010	2011	2012	SR	W–L	Win%
Tournaments	5	2	12	25	22	21	6	3	Career total: 96		
Titles	0	0	2	0	1	2	0	0	Career total: 5		
Finals	0	0	3	1	1	2	0	0	Career total: 7		
Hard win–loss	0–1	0–0	15–4	5–16	10–16	13–11	2–2	0–2	1 / 51	45–52	46%
Clay win–loss	5–5	1–2	14–4	14–7	14–5	14–5	2–3	0–0	4 / 35	64–31	67%
Grass win–loss	0–0	0–0	1–1	3–1	0–1	1–2	0–0	0–1	0 / 6	5–6	45%
Carpet win–loss	0–0	0–0	0–1	7–2	0–1	2–1	0–0	0–0	0 / 4	9–5	64%
Overall win–loss	5–6	1–2	30–10	29–26	24–23	30–19	4–5	0–3	5 / 96	123–94	57%
Year-end ranking	181	207	20	28	40	37	256	1025	$2,120,121		

=== Doubles ===
Tournament	2004	2005	2006	2007	2008	2009	2010	2011	2012	SR	W–L	Win%
Grand Slam
Australian Open	A	A	3R	2R	1R	3R	2R	A	A	0 / 5	6–5	55%
French Open	A	A	1R	3R	3R	2R	2R	A	A	0 / 5	6–5	55%
Wimbledon	A	A	A	2R	3R	1R	QF	A	A	0 / 4	6–4	60%
US Open	A	A	A	SF	A	2R	A	A	1R	0 / 3	5–3	63%
Win–loss	0–0	0–0	2–2	8–4	4–3	4–4	5–3	0–0	0–1	0 / 17	23–17	58%
National representation
Summer Olympics	A	NH			1R	NH			1R	0 / 2	0–2	0%
WTA 1000 + former^{†} tournaments
Dubai / Qatar Open	NMS				1R	A	A	A	A	0 / 1	0–1	0%
Indian Wells Open	A	A	A	A	A	1R	A	1R	A	0 / 2	0–2	0%
Miami Open	A	A	A	A	2R	1R	A	1R	A	0 / 3	1–3	25%
Berlin / Madrid Open	A	A	A	A	A	A	2R	A	A	0 / 1	1–0	100%
Italian Open	A	A	A	A	A	2R	A	A	A	0 / 1	1–0	100%
Canadian Open	A	A	A	2R	A	2R	A	A	A	0 / 2	2–1	67%
Cincinnati Open	NMS					A	A	A	A	0 / 0	0–0	–
Pan Pacific Open	A	A	A	A	QF	A	A	A	A	0 / 1	1–1	50%
China Open	NMS					2R	QF	A	A	0 / 2	3–2	60%
Charleston Open^{†}	A	A	A	A	QF	NMS				0 / 1	2–0	100%
Zurich Open^{†}	A	QF	A	A	NH/NMS					0 / 1	1–1	50%
Career statistics
	2004	2005	2006	2007	2008	2009	2010	2011	2012	SR	W–L	Win%
Tournaments	1	7	7	13	13	14	11	4	3	Career total: 73		
Titles	0	0	0	1	1	0	0	0	0	Career total: 2		
Finals	1	1	1	3	1	0	1	0	0	Career total: 8		
Hard win–loss	0–0	6–4	3–2	10–6	6–8	6–9	3–4	0–2	0–2	1 / 39	34–37	48%
Clay win–loss	3–1	4–4	3–4	11–5	5–2	3–3	6–5	3–2	0–0	1 / 28	38–26	59%
Grass win–loss	0–0	0–0	0–0	1–1	2–1	0–1	3–1	0–0	0–1	0 / 5	6–5	55%
Carpet win–loss	0–0	0–0	0–0	0–1	2–1	0–0	0–0	0–0	0–0	0 / 1	2–2	50%
Overall win–loss	3–1	10–8	6–6	22–13	15–12	9–13	12–10	3–4	0–3	2 / 73	80–70	53%
Year-end ranking	275	95	104	26	64	90	57	237	n/a			

== WTA Tour finals ==
=== Singles: 7 (5 titles, 2 runner–ups) ===
Legend WTA 500 (Tier II) (1–2) WTA 250 (Tier IV / International) (4–0)	Finals by surface Hard (1–2) Clay (4–0)

Result	W–L	Date	Tournament	Tier	Surface	Opponent	Score
Win	1–0	Jul 2007	Palermo International, Italy	Tier IV	Clay	(Germany) Martina Müller	6–0, 6–1
Loss	1–1	Aug 2007	Connecticut Open, United States	Tier II	Hard	(Russia) Svetlana Kuznetsova	6–4, 0–3 ret.
Win	2–1	Sep 2007	China Open	Tier II	Hard	(Serbia) Jelena Janković	6–7^{(7–9)}, 7–5, 6–2
Loss	2–2	Feb 2008	Open GDF Suez, France	Tier II	Hard	(Russia) Anna Chakvetadze	3–6, 6–2, 2–6
Win	3–2	Jul 2009	Budapest Grand Prix, Hungary	International	Clay	(Switzerland) Patty Schnyder	2–6, 6–4, 6–2
Win	4–2	Jul 2010	Budapest Grand Prix, Hungary (2)	International	Clay	(Switzerland) Patty Schnyder	6–2, 6–4
Win	5–2	Jul 2010	Prague Open, Czech Republic	International	Clay	(Czech Republic) Barbora Záhlavová-Strýcová	6–2, 1–6, 6–2

=== Doubles: 8 (2 titles, 6 runner–ups) ===
Legend WTA 500 (Tier II) (0–1) WTA 250 (Tier III / Tier V / International) (2–5)	Finals by surface Hard (1–3) Clay (1–3)

Result	W–L	Date	Tournament	Tier	Surface	Partner	Opponents	Score
Loss	0–1	Jul 2004	Budapest Grand Prix, Hungary	Tier V	Clay	(Hungary) Virág Németh	(Hungary) Petra Mandula (Austria) Barbara Schett	3–6, 2–6
Loss	0–2	Oct 2005	Hasselt Cup, Belgium	Tier III	Hard (i)	(Netherlands) Michaëlla Krajicek	(France) Émilie Loit (Slovenia) Katarina Srebotnik	3–6, 4–6
Loss	0–3	Feb 2006	Copa Colsanitas, Colombia	Tier III	Hard	(Germany) Jasmin Wöhr	(Argentina) Gisela Dulko (Italy) Flavia Pennetta	6–7, 1–6
Loss	0–4	Mar 2007	Qatar Open	Tier II	Hard	(Czech Republic) Vladimíra Uhlířová	(Switzerland) Martina Hingis (Russia) Maria Kirilenko	1–6, 1–6
Win	1–4	Apr 2007	Budapest Grand Prix, Hungary	Tier IV	Clay	(Czech Republic) Vladimíra Uhlířová	(Germany) Martina Müller (Czech Republic) Gabriela Navrátilová	7–5, 6–2
Loss	1–5	Jul 2007	Gastein Ladies, Austria	Tier III	Clay	(Czech Republic) Vladimíra Uhlířová	(Czech Republic) Lucie Hradecká (Czech Republic) Renata Voráčová	3–6, 5–7
Win	2–5	Jan 2008	Australian Hard Court Championships	Tier III	Hard	(Russia) Dinara Safina	(China) Yan Zi (China) Zheng Jie	6–1, 6–2
Loss	2–6	Jul 2010	Prague Open, Czech Republic	International	Clay	(Romania) Monica Niculescu	(Switzerland) Timea Bacsinszky (Italy) Tathiana Garbin	5–7, 6–7^{(4–7)}

== ITF Circuit finals ==
=== Singles: 4 (3 titles, 1 runner–up) ===
Legend
$75,000 tournaments
$50,000 tournaments
$10,000 tournaments

Result	W–L	Date	Tournament	Tier	Surface	Opponent	Score
Win	1–0	Sep 2004	ITF Ciampino, Italy	10,000	Clay	(Switzerland) Stefania Boffa	6–0, 6–2
Loss	1–1	Oct 2006	ITF Ashland, United States	50,000	Hard	(Canada) Aleksandra Wozniak	1–6, 6–7^{(2–7)}
Win	2–1	Oct 2006	ITF Houston, United States	50,000	Hard	(United States) Bethanie Mattek	2–6, 6–4, 6–1
Win	3–1	May 2007	ITF Zagreb, Croatia	75,000	Clay	(Croatia) Nika Ožegović	6–0, 7–6^{(7–2)}

=== Doubles: 5 (3 titles, 2 runner–ups) ===
Legend
$75,000 tournaments
$50,000 tournaments
$10,000 tournaments

Result	W–L	Date	Tournament	Tier	Surface	Partner	Opponents	Score
Loss	0–1	Oct 2003	ITF Carcavelos, Portugal	10,000	Clay	(Colombia) Romy Farah	(Czech Republic) Iveta Gerlová (Slovakia) Katarína Kachlíková	4–6, 6–7^{(6–8)}
Win	1–1	Apr 2005	ITF Dinan, France	75,000	Clay	(Netherlands) Michaëlla Krajicek	(Ukraine) Yuliya Beygelzimer (Germany) Sandra Klösel	7–5, 7–5
Win	2–1	Jul 2006	ITF Vittel, France	50,000	Clay	(Ukraine) Yuliya Beygelzimer	(Romania) Mădălina Gojnea (Russia) Ekaterina Makarova	6–2, 7–5
Loss	2–2	Oct 2006	ITF Ashland, United States	50,000	Hard	(United States) Ashley Harkleroad	(Venezuela) Milagros Sequera (United States) Julie Ditty	3–6, 7–5, 2–6
Win	3–2	May 2007	ITF Zagreb, Croatia	75,000	Clay	(Finland) Emma Laine	(Poland) Klaudia Jans (Poland) Alicja Rosolska	6–1, 6–2

== Record against other players ==
=== Top 10 wins ===
Season	2007	2008	2009	2010	Total
Wins	3	1	3	1	8

#	Player	vsRank	Event	Surface	Round	Score	ASR
2007
1.	(Slovakia) Daniela Hantuchová	10	Connecticut Open, United States	Hard	2R	7–5, 6–3	41
2.	(Russia) Nadia Petrova	8	US Open	Hard	3R	6–4, 6–4	31
3.	(Serbia) Jelena Janković	3	China Open	Hard	F	6–7^{(7–9)}, 7–5, 6–2	23
2008
4.	(Slovakia) Daniela Hantuchová	8	Open GDF Suez, France	Carpet	QF	7–6^{(7–4)}, 6–1	20
2009
5.	(Serbia) Ana Ivanovic	7	Miami Open, United States	Hard	3R	6–4, 4–6, 6–1	25
6.	(Belarus) Victoria Azarenka	9	Madrid Open, Spain	Clay	3R	4–6, 6–2, 6–2	38
7.	(United States) Venus Williams	3	French Open	Clay	3R	6–0, 6–4	31
2010
8.	(Serbia) Jelena Janković	8	Sydney International, Australia	Hard	1R	5–7, 6–1, 7–5	40
