= 2004 Open Gaz de France =

- Date: 9–15 February
- Edition: 12th
- Category: Tier II
- Draw: 28S / 16D
- Prize money: $585,000
- Location: Paris, France
- Venue: Stade Pierre de Coubertin

Champions

Singles
- (Belgium) Kim Clijsters

Doubles
- (Austria) Barbara Schett / (Switzerland) Patty Schnyder
← 2003 ·	Open Gaz de France	· 2005 →

The 2004 Open Gaz de France was a women's tennis tournament played on indoor hard courts at the Stade Pierre de Coubertin in Paris in France that was part of Tier II of the 2004 WTA Tour. The tournament was held from 9 February until 15 February 2004. First-seeded Kim Clijsters won the singles title.

== Finals ==
=== Singles ===
(Belgium) Kim Clijsters defeated (France) Mary Pierce 6–2, 6–1

- It was Clijsters's 1st title of the year and the 31st title of her career.

=== Doubles ===
(Austria) Barbara Schett / (Switzerland) Patty Schnyder defeated (Italy) Silvia Farina Elia / (Italy) Francesca Schiavone 6–3, 6–2

- It was Schett's only title of the year and the 13th title of her career. It was Schnyder's only title of the year and the 12th of her career.
