= 2004 Open Gaz de France – Doubles =

Doubles
- 2004 Open Gaz de France

Final
- Champions: (Austria) Barbara Schett (Switzerland) Patty Schnyder
- Runners-up: (Italy) Silvia Farina Elia (Italy) Francesca Schiavone
- Score: 6–3, 6–2

Events
Singles	Doubles
← 2003 ·	Open Gaz de France	· 2005 →

Barbara Schett and Patty Schnyder were the defending champions and won in the final 6–3, 6–2 against Silvia Farina Elia and Francesca Schiavone.

== Seeds ==
Champion seeds are indicated in bold text while text in italics indicates the round in which those seeds were eliminated.

1. (France) Émilie Loit / (Hungary) Petra Mandula (first round)
2. (Spain) Magüi Serna / (Venezuela) María Vento-Kabchi (semifinals)
3. (Austria) **Barbara Schett** / (Switzerland) **Patty Schnyder (champions)**
4. (Greece) Eleni Daniilidou / (Slovakia) Daniela Hantuchová (first round)

== Draw ==
=== Key ===
- Q = Qualifier
- WC = Wild card
- LL = Lucky loser
- Alt = Alternate
- SE = Special exempt
- PR = Protected ranking
- ITF = ITF entry
- JE = Junior exempt
- w/o = Walkover
- r = Retired
- d = Defaulted
- SR = Special ranking

First round
1	(France) É Loit (Hungary) P Mandula	3	3
(Italy) **S Farina Elia** (Italy) **F Schiavone**	**6**	**6**
(Czech Republic) **D Bedáňová** (Russia) **D Safina**	**6**	**6**
WC	(France) S Cohen-Aloro (France) T Golovin	4	3
4	(Greece) E Daniilidou (Slovakia) D Hantuchová	4	4
(France) **C Dhenin** (Croatia) **S Talaja**	**6**	**6**
(Slovenia) T Križan (Ukraine) E Tatarkova	1	3
(Italy) **M E Camerin** (Germany) **M Weingärtner**	**6**	**6**
(Czech Republic) **D Chládková** (Russia) **E Dementieva**	**7**	**6**
(France) S Foretz (Germany) C Schneider	5	0
(Italy) T Garbin (Italy) R Grande	2	2
3	(Austria) **B Schett** (Switzerland) **P Schnyder**	**6**	**6**
(Spain) **M Marrero** (Spain) **A Medina Garrigues**	6^{3}	**7^{8}**	**6**
(Ukraine) Y Beygelmizer (Spain) C Martínez Granados	**7^{7}**	6^{6}	3
Q	(Austria) D Klemenschits (Austria) S Klemenschits	5	1
2	(Spain) **M Serna** (Venezuela) **M Vento-Kabchi**	**7**	**6**

Quarterfinals
(Italy) **S Farina Elia** (Italy) **F Schiavone**	0	**6**	**6**
(Czech Republic) D Bedáňová (Russia) D Safina	**6**	2	4
(France) C Dhenin (Croatia) S Talaja	1	3
(Italy) **M E Camerin** (Germany) **M Weingärtner**	**6**	**6**
(Czech Republic) D Chládková (Russia) E Dementieva	5	5
3	(Austria) **B Schett** (Switzerland) **P Schnyder**	**7**	**7**
(Spain) M Marrero (Spain) A Medina Garrigues	3	3
2	(Spain) **M Serna** (Venezuela) **M Vento-Kabchi**	**6**	**6**

Semifinals
(Italy) **S Farina Elia** (Italy) **F Schiavone**	**w/o**
(Italy) M E Camerin (Germany) M Weingärtner
3	(Austria) **B Schett** (Switzerland) **P Schnyder**	**6**	**6**
2	(Spain) M Serna (Venezuela) M Vento-Kabchi	1	3

Final
(Italy) Silvia Farina Elia (Italy) Francesca Schiavone	3	2
3	(Austria) **Barbara Schett** (Switzerland) **Patty Schnyder**	**6**	**6**
