= 2006 Open Gaz de France – Doubles =

Doubles
- 2006 Open Gaz de France

Final
- Champions: (France) Émilie Loit (Czech Republic) Květa Peschke
- Runners-up: (Zimbabwe) Cara Black (Australia) Rennae Stubbs
- Score: 7–6^{(7–5)}, 6–4

Details
- Draw: 16
- Seeds: 4

Events
Singles	Doubles
← 2005 ·	Open Gaz de France	· 2007 →

Iveta Benešová and Květa Peschke were the defending champions but only Peschke competed that year with Émilie Loit.

Loit and Peschke won in the final 7–6^{(7–5)}, 6–4 against Cara Black and Rennae Stubbs.

== Seeds ==
Champion seeds are indicated in bold text while text in italics indicates the round in which those seeds were eliminated.

1. (Zimbabwe) Cara Black / (Australia) Rennae Stubbs (final)
2. n/a
3. (France) **Émilie Loit** / (Czech Republic) **Květa Peschke (champions)**
4. (Russia) Elena Dementieva / (Italy) Flavia Pennetta (semifinals)

== Draw ==
=== Key ===
- Q = Qualifier
- WC = Wild card
- LL = Lucky loser
- Alt = Alternate
- ITF = ITF entry
- PR = Protected ranking
- SR = Special ranking
- SE = Special exempt
- JE = Junior exempt
- JR = Junior Accelerator Programme entrant
- CO = College Accelerator Programme entrant
- NG = Next Gen Accelerator Program entrant
- w/o = Walkover
- r = Retired
- d = Defaulted

First round
1	(Zimbabwe) **C Black** (Australia) **R Stubbs**	**6**	**6**
(Poland) M Domachowska (Italy) R Vinci	4	3
(France) **S Cohen-Aloro** (Tunisia) **S Sfar**	4	**7**	**6**
Q	(Poland) K Jans (Poland) A Rosolska	**6**	5	2
4	(Russia) **E Dementieva** (Italy) **F Pennetta**	**6**	**6**
(Greece) E Daniilidou (Spain) A Medina Garrigues	4	1
(Ukraine) **Y Beygelzimer** (Romania) **A Vanc**	**7^{7}**	**6**
(Czech Republic) G Navrátilová (Czech Republic) V Uhlířová	6^{4}	2
(Russia) **V Dushevina** (Russia) **D Safina**	**6**	**6**
WC	(France) S Brémond (France) S Foretz	3	3
(Slovenia) T Križan (United States) J Russell	1	2
3	(France) **É Loit** (Czech Republic) **K Peschke**	**6**	**6**
(Latvia) L Dekmeijere (Germany) J Wöhr	1	4
(South Africa) **L Huber** (India) **S Mirza**	**6**	**6**
(Italy) **T Garbin** (United States) **M Washington**	**6**	**7^{7}**
LL	(Austria) D Klemenschits (Austria) S Klemenschits	3	6^{4}

Quarterfinals
1	(Zimbabwe) **C Black** (Australia) **R Stubbs**	**6**	**6**
(France) S Cohen-Aloro (Tunisia) S Sfar	4	4
4	(Russia) **E Dementieva** (Italy) **F Pennetta**	5	**6**	**6**
(Ukraine) Y Beygelzimer (Romania) A Vanc	**7**	3	2
(Russia) V Dushevina (Russia) D Safina	4	2
3	(France) **É Loit** (Czech Republic) **K Peschke**	**6**	**6**
(South Africa) L Huber (India) S Mirza	**7^{8}**	3	6^{5}
(Italy) **T Garbin** (United States) **M Washington**	6^{6}	**6**	**7^{7}**

Semifinals
1	(Zimbabwe) **C Black** (Australia) **R Stubbs**	**6**	**6**
4	(Russia) E Dementieva (Italy) F Pennetta	4	1
3	(France) **É Loit** (Czech Republic) **K Peschke**	**6**	**6**
(Italy) T Garbin (United States) M Washington	4	1

Final
1	(Zimbabwe) Cara Black (Australia) Rennae Stubbs	6^{5}	4
3	(France) **Émilie Loit** (Czech Republic) **Květa Peschke**	**7^{7}**	**6**
