= 2005 Open Gaz de France =

- Date: 7–13 February
- Edition: 13th
- Category: Tier II
- Draw: 28S / 16D
- Prize money: $585,000
- Location: Paris, France
- Venue: Stade Pierre de Coubertin

Champions

Singles
- (Russia) Dinara Safina

Doubles
- (Czech Republic) Iveta Benešová / (Czech Republic) Květa Peschke
← 2004 ·	Open Gaz de France	· 2006 →

The 2005 Open Gaz de France was a women's tennis tournament played on indoor hard courts at the Stade Pierre de Coubertin in Paris, France, that was part of Tier II of the 2005 WTA Tour. It was the 13th edition of the tournament and was held from 7 February until 13 February 2005. Dinara Safina won the singles title. Unseeded Dinara Safina won the singles title.

== Finals ==
=== Singles ===
(Russia) Dinara Safina defeated (France) Amélie Mauresmo 6–4, 2–6, 6–3

- It was Safina's 1st title of the year and the 4th title of her career.

=== Doubles ===
(Czech Republic) Iveta Benešová / (Czech Republic) Květa Peschke defeated (Spain) Anabel Medina Garrigues / (Russia) Dinara Safina 6–2, 2–6, 6–2

- It was Benesova's only title of the year and the 2nd title of her career. It was Peschke's 1st title of the year and the 4th title of her career.
