= 2005 Open Gaz de France – Doubles =

Doubles
- 2005 Open Gaz de France

Final
- Champions: (Czech Republic) Iveta Benešová (Czech Republic) Květa Peschke
- Runners-up: (Spain) Anabel Medina Garrigues (Russia) Dinara Safina
- Score: 6–2, 2–6, 6–2

Events
Singles	Doubles
← 2004 ·	Open Gaz de France	· 2006 →

Barbara Schett and Patty Schnyder were the defending champions but did not compete that year.

Iveta Benešová and Květa Peschke won in the final 6–2, 2–6, 6–2 against Anabel Medina Garrigues and Dinara Safina.

== Seeds ==
Champion seeds are indicated in bold text while text in italics indicates the round in which those seeds were eliminated.

1. (Spain) Anabel Medina Garrigues / (Russia) Dinara Safina (final)
2. (Italy) Silvia Farina Elia / (Spain) Marta Marrero (quarterfinals)
3. (Italy) Tathiana Garbin / (Slovenia) Tina Križan (semifinals)
4. (Croatia) Jelena Kostanić / (Luxembourg) Claudine Schaul (quarterfinals)

== Draw ==
=== Key ===
- Q = Qualifier
- WC = Wild card
- LL = Lucky loser
- Alt = Alternate
- SE = Special exempt
- PR = Protected ranking
- ITF = ITF entry
- JE = Junior exempt
- w/o = Walkover
- r = Retired
- d = Defaulted
- SR = Special ranking

First round
1	(Spain) **A Medina Garrigues** (Russia) **D Safina**	**7^{7}**	**6**
(Germany) V Henke (France) C Pin	6^{5}	2
(France) **S Foretz** (France) **V Razzano**	**6**	**6**
(France) S Delobelle (France) P Leroy	3	1
4	(Croatia) **J Kostanić** (Luxembourg) **C Schaul**	**6**	**6**
(Spain) P García (Germany) C Schneider	2	4
(Italy) **M E Camerin** (Czech Republic) **D Chládková**	**7^{7}**	**6**
(France) C Dhenin (Canada) M Drake	6^{4}	4
(France) **S Cohen-Aloro** (Tunisia) **S Sfar**	**7**	**6**
(Latvia) L Dekmeijere (Japan) N Miyagi	5	1
(Serbia and Montenegro) J Janković (Belarus) A Yakimova	4	1
3	(Italy) **T Garbin** (Slovenia) **T Križan**	**6**	**6**
(United Kingdom) C Curran (Netherlands) K Kilsdonk	4	3
(Czech Republic) **I Benešová** (Czech Republic) **K Peschke**	**6**	**6**
(France) S Beltrame (Greece) E Daniilidou
2	(Italy) **S Farina Elia** (Spain) **M Marrero**	**w/o**

Quarterfinals
1	(Spain) **A Medina Garrigues** (Russia) **D Safina**	**6**	**6**
(France) S Foretz (France) V Razzano	2	2
4	(Croatia) J Kostanić (Luxembourg) C Schaul	**7^{7}**	2	1
(Italy) **M E Camerin** (Czech Republic) **D Chládková**	6^{4}	**6**	**6**
(France) S Cohen-Aloro (Tunisia) S Sfar	3	2
3	(Italy) **T Garbin** (Slovenia) **T Križan**	**6**	**6**
(Czech Republic) **I Benešová** (Czech Republic) **K Peschke**	**7^{7}**	**6**
2	(Italy) S Farina Elia (Spain) M Marrero	6^{5}	0

Semifinals
1	(Spain) **A Medina Garrigues** (Russia) **D Safina**	**6**	**6**
(Italy) M E Camerin (Czech Republic) D Chládková	4	1
3	(Italy) T Garbin (Slovenia) T Križan	3	5
(Czech Republic) **I Benešová** (Czech Republic) **K Peschke**	**6**	**7**

Final
1	(Spain) Anabel Medina Garrigues (Russia) Dinara Safina	2	**6**	2
(Czech Republic) **Iveta Benešová** (Czech Republic) **Květa Peschke**	**6**	2	**6**
