= 2008 Pilot Pen Tennis – Men's singles =

Men's singles
- 2008 Pilot Pen Tennis

Final
- Champion: (Croatia) Marin Čilić
- Runner-up: (United States) Mardy Fish
- Score: 6–4, 4–6, 6–2

Events
Singles	men	women
Doubles	men	women
← 2007 ·	Pilot Pen Tennis	· 2009 →

James Blake was the defending champion, but chose not to participate that year.

Marin Čilić won in the final 6–4, 4–6, 6–2, against Mardy Fish.

== Seeds ==
All seeds receive a bye into the second round.

1. (Spain) Fernando Verdasco (semifinals)
2. (Croatia) Ivo Karlović (third round)
3. (Argentina) Juan Martín del Potro (withdrew due to fatigue)
4. (Russia) Igor Andreev (quarterfinals)
5. (Argentina) Juan Mónaco (second round)
6. (Croatia) Marin Čilić (champion)
7. (Italy) Andreas Seppi (quarterfinals)
8. (United States) Mardy Fish (final)
9. (France) Marc Gicquel (third round)
10. (Italy) Simone Bolelli (second round)
11. (Austria) Jürgen Melzer (third round)
12. (Argentina) Agustín Calleri (second round)
13. (Spain) Marcel Granollers (second round)
14. (Argentina) José Acasuso (second round)
15. (Argentina) Eduardo Schwank (second round)
16. (Romania) Victor Hănescu (third round)

== Draw ==
=== Key ===
- Q = Qualifier
- WC = Wild card
- LL = Lucky loser
- Alt = Alternate
- ITF = ITF entry
- PR = Protected ranking
- SR = Special ranking
- SE = Special exempt
- JE = Junior exempt
- JR = Junior Accelerator Programme entrant
- CO = College Accelerator Programme entrant
- NG = Next Gen Accelerator Program entrant
- w/o = Walkover
- r = Retired
- d = Defaulted

=== Finals ===
Quarterfinals
1	(Spain) Fernando Verdasco	6	7
(Germany) Mischa Zverev	2	6^{4}
LL	(United States) Jesse Levine	3	6^{4}
8	(United States) Mardy Fish	6	7
6	(Croatia) Marin Čilić	6	6
4	(Russia) Igor Andreev	3	2
7	(Italy) Andreas Seppi	6	4	5
Q	(Slovenia) Luka Gregorc	4	6	7

Semifinals
1	(Spain) Fernando Verdasco	0	6	3
8	(United States) Mardy Fish	6	1	6
6	(Croatia) Marin Čilić	6	6
Q	(Slovenia) Luka Gregorc	3	3

Final
8	(United States) Mardy Fish	4	6	2
6	(Croatia) Marin Čilić	6	4	6

=== Top half ===
==== Section 1 ====
First round
(Israel) D Sela	6	6
WC	(United States) D Young	4	2
(Czech Republic) I Minář	5	6	6
(France) N Mahut	7	3	3
(Peru) L Horna	6^{4}	2
WC	(United States) R Ginepri	7	6
(Germany) M Zverev	6	7
(France) F Serra	2	6^{6}

Second round
1	(Spain) F Verdasco	6	6
(Israel) D Sela	4	4
(Czech Republic) I Minář	7	6
15	(Argentina) E Schwank	5	3
12	(Argentina) A Calleri	2	6	2
WC	(United States) R Ginepri	6	4	6
(Germany) M Zverev	6	6
5	(Argentina) J Mónaco	3	3

Third round
1	(Spain) F Verdasco	6	6
(Czech Republic) I Minář	3	1
WC	(United States) R Ginepri	6	3	1
(Germany) M Zverev	1	6	6

Quarterfinals
1	(Spain) F Verdasco	6	7
(Germany) M Zverev	2	6^{4}

==== Section 2 ====
First round
(Australia) C Guccione	5	3
(Spain) G García López	7	6
(Belgium) S Darcis	7	5
Q	(United States) V Spadea	5	0	r
(Spain) Montañés	7	7
(France) N Devilder	6^{5}	5
(United States) W Odesnik	7	6
(France) S Grosjean	5	4

Second round
LL	(United States) J Levine	6	6
(Spain) G García López	0	3
(Belgium) S Darcis	6	6
13	(Spain) M Granollers	2	2
9	(France) M Gicquel	7	6
(Spain) Montañés	5	3
(United States) W Odesnik	1	6	1
8	(United States) M Fish	6	4	6

Third round
LL	(United States) J Levine	2
(Belgium) S Darcis	0	r
9	(France) M Gicquel	4	3
8	(United States) M Fish	6	6

Quarterfinals
LL	(United States) J Levine	3	6^{4}
8	(United States) M Fish	6	7

=== Bottom half ===
==== Section 3 ====
First round
(Serbia) V Troicki	7	2	6
Q	(United States) A Bogomolov Jr.	5	6	1
(Brazil) T Bellucci	4	4
(France) A Clément	6	6
(Germany) D Gremelmayr	3	6	6
(Brazil) M Daniel	6	3	3
(Belgium) O Rochus	6	6
(Russia) E Korolev	4	4

Second round
6	(Croatia) M Čilić	2
(Serbia) V Troicki	1	r
(France) A Clément	6^{1}	5
11	(Austria) J Melzer	7	7
16	(Romania) V Hănescu	6^{5}	7	6
(Germany) D Gremelmayr	7	6^{3}	2
(Belgium) O Rochus	3	4
4	(Russia) I Andreev	6	6

Third round
6	(Croatia) M Čilić	5	6	7
11	(Austria) J Melzer	7	4	5
16	(Romania) V Hănescu	4	5
4	(Russia) I Andreev	6	7

Quarterfinals
6	(Croatia) M Čilić	6	6
4	(Russia) I Andreev	3	2

==== Section 4 ====
First round
(Czech Republic) J Vaněk	2	6^{7}
(Italy) P Starace	6	7
(Italy) F Fognini	6	4
(Ecuador) N Lapentti	4	4	r
Q	(Paraguay) R Delgado	2	6	0
Q	(Slovenia) L Gregorc	6	3	6
WC	(United States) J Isner	6	6
(Russia) I Kunitsyn	4	4

Second round
7	(Italy) A Seppi	4	6	6
(Italy) P Starace	6	4	4
(Italy) F Fognini	6	5	6
10	(Italy) S Bolelli	2	7	4
14	(Argentina) J Acasuso	4	4
Q	(Slovenia) L Gregorc	6	6
WC	(United States) J Isner	7	3	4
2/WC	(Croatia) I Karlović	6^{4}	6	6

Third round
7	(Italy) A Seppi	6	6
(Italy) F Fognini	4	2
Q	(Slovenia) L Gregorc	7	4	6
2/WC	(Croatia) I Karlović	6^{4}	6	2

Quarterfinals
7	(Italy) A Seppi	6	4	5
Q	(Slovenia) L Gregorc	4	6	7
