= Paula García (tennis) =

Spanish tennis player (born 1979)

- Country (sports): Spain
- Born: 19 March 1979 (age 46); Alicante, Spain
- Turned pro: 1995
- Retired: 2008
- Plays: Right-handed (two-handed backhand)
- Prize money: $127,246

Singles
- Career record: 258–245
- Career titles: 5 ITF
- Highest ranking: 139 (23 May 2005)

Grand Slam singles results
- Australian Open: Q1 (2005)
- French Open: Q1 (2005)
- Wimbledon: Q2 (2005)
- US Open: Q1 (2004, 2005)

Doubles
- Career record: 67–96
- Career titles: 4 ITF
- Highest ranking: 214 (6 June 2002)

Paula García (born 19 March 1979) is a retired Spanish tennis player.

García has a career-high singles ranking by the Women's Tennis Association (WTA) of 139, achieved on 23 May 2005. She also has a career-high WTA doubles ranking of 214, set on 6 June 2002. García won five ITF singles titles and four ITF doubles titles.

She made her WTA Tour main-draw debut at the Abierto Mexicano, after coming through the qualifying rounds. García made her WTA Tour debut in a doubles draw at the 2005 Open Gaz de France, partnering Caroline Schneider.

She announced her retirement from professional tennis in 2008.

== ITF finals ==
=== Singles (5–5) ===
Legend $100,000 tournaments $75,000 tournaments $50,000 tournaments $25,000 tournaments $10,000 tournaments	Finals by surface Hard (0–0) Clay (5–5) Grass (0–0) Carpet (0–0)

Result	Date	Tier	Tournament	Surface	Opponent	Score
Runner-up	3 February 1997	10,000	ITF Mallorca, Spain	Clay	(Italy) Maria Paola Zavagli	2–6, 2–6
Winner	11 August 1997	10,000	Open Saint-Gaudens, France	Clay	(Spain) Rosa María Andrés Rodríguez	2–6, 6–4, 7–5
Runner-up	5 July 1999	10,000	ITF Vigo, Spain	Clay	(Spain) Nuria Llagostera Vives	5–7, 4–6
Runner-up	31 January 2000	10,000	ITF Mallorca, Spain	Clay	(Czech Republic) Gabriela Chmelinová	1–6, 6–2, 3–6
Runner-up	4 February 2002	10,000	ITF Mallorca, Spain	Clay	(Spain) Rosa María Andrés Rodríguez	3–6, 6–3, 6–7^{(5)}
Winner	23 May 2004	25,000	ITF Caserta, Italy	Clay (i)	(Czech Republic) Kateřina Böhmová	0–6, 6–3, 6–2
Winner	31 May 2004	25,000	ITF Galatina, Italy	Clay	(Italy) Valentina Sassi	6–1, 3–6, 6–2
Runner-up	7 June 2004	25,000	ITF Grado, Italy	Clay	(Spain) Nuria Llagostera Vives	7–5, 2–6, 1–6
Winner	4 July 2004	25,000	ITF Mont-de-Marsan, France	Clay	(Russia) Maria Kondratieva	6–3, 6–2
Winner	26 April 2005	25,000	ITF Torrent, Spain	Clay	(Argentina) Natalia Gussoni	6–3, 5–7, 6–0

=== Doubles (4–3) ===
Legend $100,000 tournaments $75,000 tournaments $50,000 tournaments $25,000 tournaments $10,000 tournaments	Finals by surface Hard (0–0) Clay (4–3) Grass (0–0) Carpet (0–0)

Result	Date	Tier	Tournament	Surface	Partner	Opponents	Score
Winner	3 August 1998	10,000	ITF Périgueux, France	Clay	(Republic of Ireland) Kelly Liggan	(France) Samantha Schoeffel (France) Stéphanie Testard	3–6, 6–3, 7–6^{(3)}
Runner-up	10 August 1998	10,000	Open Saint-Gaudens, France	Clay	(Republic of Ireland) Kelly Liggan	(France) Sylvie Sallaberry (France) Aurélie Védy	3–6, 6–7^{(5)}
Runner-up	7 December 1998	10,000	ITF Mallorca, Spain	Clay	(Republic of Ireland) Kelly Liggan	(Italy) Katia Altilia (Italy) Giulia Casoni	3–6, 6–7^{(4)}
Winner	29 June 2003	25,000	ITF Mont-de-Marsan, France	Clay	(Spain) María José Martínez Sánchez	(France) Kildine Chevalier (Greece) Christina Zachariadou	6–4, 7–5
Runner-up	11 August 2003	25,000	ITF Martina Franca, Italy	Clay	(Spain) María José Martínez Sánchez	(Bosnia and Herzegovina) Mervana Jugić-Salkić (Croatia) Darija Jurak	6–2, 4–6, 1–6
Winner	28 June 2004	25,000	ITF Mont-de-Marsan, France	Clay	(Spain) Lourdes Domínguez Lino	(Russia) Nina Bratchikova (Portugal) Frederica Piedade	6–3, 3–6, 6–4
Winner	26 April 2005	25,000	ITF Torrent, Spain	Clay	(Italy) Sara Errani	(Spain) Núria Roig (Spain) Gabriela Velasco Andreu	6–7^{(5)}, 6–4, 6–2
