= 2008 Pilot Pen Tennis – Women's doubles =

Women's doubles
- 2008 Pilot Pen Tennis

Final
- Champions: (Czech Republic) Květa Peschke (United States) Lisa Raymond
- Runners-up: (Romania) Sorana Cîrstea (Romania) Monica Niculescu
- Score: 4–6, 7–5, 10–7

Events
Singles	men	women
Doubles	men	women
← 2007 ·	Pilot Pen Tennis	· 2009 →

Sania Mirza and Mara Santangelo were the defending champions, but chose not to participate that year.

Květa Peschke and Lisa Raymond won in the final 4–6, 7–5, 10–7, against Sorana Cîrstea and Monica Niculescu.

== Seeds ==
1. (Zimbabwe) Cara Black / (United States) Liezel Huber (first round)
2. (Czech Republic) Květa Peschke / (United States) Lisa Raymond (champions)
3. (France) Nathalie Dechy / (Australia) Casey Dellacqua (quarterfinals)
4. (Slovakia) Janette Husárová / (United States) Bethanie Mattek (first round, retired due to a left knee injury for Husárová)

== Draw ==
=== Key ===
- Q = Qualifier
- WC = Wild card
- LL = Lucky loser
- Alt = Alternate
- SE = Special exempt
- PR = Protected ranking
- ITF = ITF entry
- JE = Junior exempt
- w/o = Walkover
- r = Retired
- d = Defaulted
- SR = Special ranking

First round
1	(Zimbabwe) C Black (United States) L Huber	3	6	[6]
WC	(Latvia) L Dekmeijere (Switzerland) P Schnyder	6	3	[10]
(Romania) S Cîrstea (Romania) M Niculescu	6	6
(Poland) K Jans (Poland) A Rosolska	1	4
3	(France) N Dechy (Australia) C Dellacqua	6	3	[10]
(Croatia) J Kostanić Tošić (Belarus) D Kustova	3	6	[6]
(Czech Republic) V Uhlířová (Czech Republic) B Záhlavová-Strýcová	7	4	[7]
(United States) V King (Russia) A Kudryavtseva	6^{2}	6	[10]
(United States) L Davenport (Slovakia) D Hantuchová	6	6
(United States) J Craybas (Belarus) O Govortsova	3	4
(Russia) A Rodionova (Russia) G Voskoboeva	4
4	(Slovakia) J Husárová (United States) B Mattek	1	r
(Russia) M Kirilenko (Italy) F Pennetta	6	6
WC	(United States) M Cecil (United States) R Stephenson	1	3
(Spain) N Llagostera Vives (Spain) MJ Martínez Sánchez	3	4
2	(Czech Republic) K Peschke (United States) L Raymond	6	6

Quarterfinals
WC	(Latvia) L Dekmeijere (Switzerland) P Schnyder	3	3
(Romania) S Cîrstea (Romania) M Niculescu	6	6
3	(France) N Dechy (Australia) C Dellacqua	5	6	[10]
(United States) V King (Russia) A Kudryavtseva	7	4	[12]
(United States) L Davenport (Slovakia) D Hantuchová	3	6	[9]
(Russia) A Rodionova (Russia) G Voskoboeva	6	1	[11]
(Russia) M Kirilenko (Italy) F Pennetta	2	2
2	(Czech Republic) K Peschke (United States) L Raymond	6	6

Semifinals
(Romania) S Cîrstea (Romania) M Niculescu	6^{3}	6	[10]
(United States) V King (Russia) A Kudryavtseva	7	4	[5]
(Russia) A Rodionova (Russia) G Voskoboeva	1	0
2	(Czech Republic) K Peschke (United States) L Raymond	6	6

Final
(Romania) S Cîrstea (Romania) M Niculescu	6	5	[7]
2	(Czech Republic) K Peschke (United States) L Raymond	4	7	[10]
