= 2004 Open Gaz de France – Singles =

Singles
- 2004 Open Gaz de France

Final
- Champion: (Belgium) Kim Clijsters
- Runner-up: (France) Mary Pierce
- Score: 6–2, 6–1

Details
- Draw: 28
- Seeds: 8

Events
Singles	Doubles
← 2003 ·	Open Gaz de France	· 2005 →

Serena Williams was the defending champion but did not compete that year.

Kim Clijsters won in the final 6–2, 6–1 against Mary Pierce.

== Seeds ==
A champion seed is indicated in bold text while text in italics indicates the round in which that seed was eliminated. The top four seeds received a bye to the second round.

1. (Belgium) **Kim Clijsters (champion)**
2. (Russia) Elena Dementieva (quarterfinals)
3. (Switzerland) Patty Schnyder (second round)
4. (Serbia and Montenegro) Jelena Dokić (second round)
5. (Italy) Francesca Schiavone (quarterfinals)
6. (Israel) Anna Smashnova-Pistolesi (first round)
7. (Italy) Silvia Farina Elia (quarterfinals)
8. (Spain) Magüi Serna (second round)

== Draw ==
=== Key ===
- Q = Qualifier
- WC = Wild card
- LL = Lucky loser
- Alt = Alternate
- SE = Special exempt
- PR = Protected ranking
- ITF = ITF entry
- JE = Junior exempt
- w/o = Walkover
- r = Retired
- d = Defaulted
- SR = Special ranking

=== Final ===
Final
1	(Belgium) **Kim Clijsters**	**6**	**6**
	(France) Mary Pierce	2	1

=== Section 1 ===
First round
(Greece) E Daniilidou	4	**6**	2
(Spain) **M Sánchez Lorenzo**	**6**	4	**6**
(Slovenia) **T Pisnik**	**6**	**6**
(Czech Republic) D Chládková	2	1
WC	(United States) A Stevenson	**7^{7}**	5	2
7	(Italy) **S Farina Elia**	6^{5}	**7**	**6**
Q	(Serbia and Montenegro) J Janković	4	0	r
Q	(Russia) **D Safina**	**6**	**2**
(Venezuela) M Vento-Kabchi	2	3
Q	(Croatia) **K Šprem**	**6**	**6**
(France) É Loit	2	**6**	3
5	(Italy) **F Schiavone**	**6**	4	**6**

Second round
1	(Belgium) **K Clijsters**	**6**	**6**
(Spain) M Sánchez Lorenzo	1	0
(Slovenia) T Pisnik	0	4
7	(Italy) **S Farina Elia**	**6**	**6**
3	(Switzerland) P Schnyder	**6**	2	1
Q	(Russia) **D Safina**	4	**6**	**6**
Q	(Croatia) K Šprem	6^{4}	3
5	(Italy) **F Schiavone**	**7^{7}**	**6**

Quarterfinals
1	(Belgium) **K Clijsters**	3	**7**	**6**
7	(Italy) S Farina Elia	**6**	5	4
Q	(Russia) **D Safina**	**6**	4	**6**
5	(Italy) F Schiavone	2	**6**	4

Semifinals
1	(Belgium) **K Clijsters**	**6**	**6**
Q	(Russia) D Safina	1	1

=== Section 2 ===
First round
8	(Spain) **M Serna**	**6**	1	**6**
(Hungary) P Mandula	3	**6**	2
(France) **M Pierce**	**7**	**6**
LL	(Spain) A Parra	5	2
(Russia) **E Bovina**	4	**6**	**6**
Q	(Spain) A Medina Garrigues	**6**	2	4
6	(Israel) A Smashnova-Pistolesi	**6**	5	1/r
WC	(France) **T Golovin**	1	**7**	**3**
(France) S Testud	3	r
(Slovakia) **D Hantuchová**	**5**
WC	(France) **S Cohen-Aloro**	4	**6**	**7**
LL	(Luxembourg) C Schaul	**6**	3	5

Second round
8	(Spain) M Serna	2	4
(France) **M Pierce**	**6**	**6**
(Russia) **E Bovina**	4	**7^{7}**	**6**
4	(Serbia and Montenegro) J Dokić	**6**	6^{5}	0
WC	(France) **T Golovin**	**w/o**
(Slovakia) D Hantuchová
WC	(France) S Cohen-Aloro	5	**6**	4
2	(Russia) **E Dementieva**	**7**	1	**6**

Quarterfinals
(France) **M Pierce**	**6**	**6**
(Russia) E Bovina	3	4
WC	(France) **T Golovin**	**6**	**6**
2	(Russia) E Dementieva	4	4

Semifinals
(France) **M Pierce**	**6**	**6**
WC	(France) T Golovin	4	0
