= 2006 Open Gaz de France =

- Date: 6–12 February
- Edition: 14th
- Category: Tier II
- Draw: 28S / 16D
- Prize money: $600,000
- Location: Paris, France
- Venue: Stade Pierre de Coubertin

Champions

Singles
- (France) Amélie Mauresmo

Doubles
- (France) Émilie Loit / (Czech Republic) Květa Peschke
← 2005 ·	Open Gaz de France	· 2007 →

The 2006 Open Gaz de France was a women's tennis tournament played on indoor hard courts. It was the 14th edition of the Open Gaz de France and was part of Tier II of the 2006 WTA Tour. The tournament took place at the Stade Pierre de Coubertin in Paris, France from 6 February through 12 February 2006. First-seeded Amélie Mauresmo won the singles title.

== Finals ==
=== Singles ===
(France) Amélie Mauresmo defeated (France) Mary Pierce 6–1, 7–6^{(7–2)}

- It was Mauresmo's 2nd title of the year and the 22nd title of her career.

=== Doubles ===
(France) Émilie Loit / (Czech Republic) Květa Peschke defeated (Zimbabwe) Cara Black / (Australia) Rennae Stubbs 7–6^{(7–5)}, 6–4

- It was Loit's 2nd title of the year and the 18th title of her career. It was Peschke's 1st title of the year and the 6th title of her career.
