= 2006 Open Gaz de France – Singles =

Singles
- 2006 Open Gaz de France

Final
- Champion: (France) Amélie Mauresmo
- Runner-up: (France) Mary Pierce
- Score: 6–1, 7–6^{(7–2)}

Details
- Draw: 28
- Seeds: 8

Events
Singles	Doubles
← 2005 ·	Open Gaz de France	· 2007 →

Dinara Safina was the defending champion but lost in the quarterfinals to Amélie Mauresmo.

Mauresmo went on to win the title, defeating Mary Pierce in the final 6–1, 7–6^{(7–2)}.

== Seeds ==
A champion seed is indicated in bold text while text in italics indicates the round in which that seed was eliminated. The top four seeds received a bye to the second round.

1. (France) **Amélie Mauresmo (champion)**
2. (France) Mary Pierce (final)
3. (Russia) Nadia Petrova (quarterfinals)
4. (Switzerland) Patty Schnyder (semifinals)
5. (Russia) Elena Dementieva (quarterfinals)
6. (Italy) Flavia Pennetta (first round)
7. (Russia) Dinara Safina (quarterfinals)
8. (Germany) Anna-Lena Grönefeld (first round)

== Draw ==
=== Key ===
- Q = Qualifier
- WC = Wild card
- LL = Lucky loser
- Alt = Alternate
- ITF = ITF entry
- PR = Protected ranking
- SR = Special ranking
- SE = Special exempt
- JE = Junior exempt
- JR = Junior Accelerator Programme entrant
- CO = College Accelerator Programme entrant
- NG = Next Gen Accelerator Program entrant
- w/o = Walkover
- r = Retired
- d = Defaulted

=== Final ===
Final
1	(France) **Amélie Mauresmo**	**6**	**7^{7}**
2	(France) Mary Pierce	1	6^{2}

=== Section 1 ===
First round
Q	(Croatia) I Lisjak	6^{4}	0
(Russia) **V Dushevina**	**7^{7}**	**6**
(France) **V Razzano**	**6**	**6**
(Czech Republic) K Peschke	1	1
(Russia) A Chakvetadze	2	1
7	(Russia) **D Safina**	**6**	**6**
(Israel) **A Smashnova**	**6**	**6**
LL	(France) S Brémond	1	2
(France) **T Golovin**	**6**	**7**
(Poland) M Domachowska	0	5
(India) **S Mirza**	**6**	**7^{7}**
6	(Italy) F Pennetta	2	6^{5}

Second round
1	(France) **A Mauresmo**	**6**	**6**
(Russia) V Dushevina	2	2
(France) V Razzano	4	3
7	(Russia) **D Safina**	**6**	**6**
3	(Russia) **N Petrova**	**6**	**6**
(Israel) A Smashnova	4	1
(France) **T Golovin**	**6**	**6**
(India) S Mirza	4	2

Quarterfinals
1	(France) **A Mauresmo**	**6**	**6**
7	(Russia) D Safina	2	2
3	(Russia) N Petrova	**6**	6^{7}	3
(France) **T Golovin**	3	**7^{9}**	**6**

Semifinals
1	(France) **A Mauresmo**	6^{5}	**7**	**6**
(France) T Golovin	**7^{7}**	5	2

=== Section 2 ===
First round
5	(Russia) **E Dementieva**	**6**	**6**
Q	(Sweden) S Arvidsson	2	2
(France) M Bartoli	0	2
(France) **N Dechy**	**6**	**6**
(Czech Republic) L Šáfařová	2	**6**	0
Q	(Bulgaria) **T Pironkova**	**6**	2	**6**
8	(Germany) A-L Grönefeld	1	**6**	0
WC	(France) **S Foretz**	**6**	1	**6**
(Italy) R Vinci	2	1
WC	(France) **É Loit**	**6**	**6**
(Spain) **A Medina Garrigues**	**6**	1	**7**
Q	(Italy) T Garbin	3	**6**	5

Second round
5	(Russia) **E Dementieva**	**7^{7}**	**6**
(France) N Dechy	6^{3}	4
Q	(Bulgaria) T Pironkova	2	4
4/WC	(Switzerland) **P Schnyder**	**6**	**6**
WC	(France) S Foretz	0	3
WC	(France) **É Loit**	**6**	**6**
(Spain) A Medina Garrigues	2	4
2	(France) **M Pierce**	**6**	**6**

Quarterfinals
5	(Russia) E Dementieva	3	3
4/WC	(Switzerland) **P Schnyder**	**6**	**6**
WC	(France) É Loit	6^{6}	6^{4}
2	(France) **M Pierce**	**7^{8}**	**7^{7}**

Semifinals
4/WC	(Switzerland) P Schnyder	4	2
2	(France) **M Pierce**	**6**	**6**
