= 2009 GDF SUEZ Grand Prix =

- Date: 4–12 July
- Edition: 14th
- Category: International
- Draw: 32S / 16D
- Prize money: $220,000
- Surface: Clay / outdoor
- Location: Budapest, Hungary

Champions

Singles
- (Hungary) Ágnes Szávay

Doubles
- (Russia) Alisa Kleybanova / (Romania) Monica Niculescu
- Budapest Grand Prix

The 2009 GDF SUEZ Grand Prix was a women's tennis tournament played on outdoor clay courts. It was the 14th edition of the Budapest Grand Prix, an International-level tournament on the 2009 WTA Tour. It took place in Budapest, Hungary, from 4 July until 12 July 2009. Fourth-seeded Ágnes Szávay won the singles title.

== Finals ==
=== Singles ===
(Hungary) Ágnes Szávay defeated (Switzerland) Patty Schnyder, 2–6, 6–4, 6–2

- It was Szávay's only singles title of the year and the 3rd of her career.

=== Doubles ===
(Russia) Alisa Kleybanova / (Romania) Monica Niculescu defeated (Ukraine) Alona Bondarenko / (Ukraine) Kateryna Bondarenko, 6–4, 7–6^{(7–5)}

== Entrants ==
=== Seeds ===
Player	Nationality	Ranking*	Seeding
Patty Schnyder	Switzerland	22	1
Alizé Cornet	France	24	2
Sybille Bammer	Austria	26	3
Ágnes Szávay	Hungary	28	4
Alisa Kleybanova	Russia	31	5
Alona Bondarenko	Ukraine	33	6
Sara Errani	Italy	39	7
Lucie Šafářová	Czech Republic	48	8

* Seedings are based on the rankings of June 22, 2009.

=== Other entrants ===
The following players received wildcards into the singles main draw:

- (Switzerland) Patty Schnyder
- (Hungary) Katalin Marosi
- (Hungary) Gréta Arn

The following players received entry from the qualifying draw:

- (Switzerland) Timea Bacsinszky
- (Georgia (country)) Margalita Chakhnashvili
- (Canada) Sharon Fichman
- (Croatia) Petra Martić

The following players received the lucky loser spots:

- (Slovakia) Lenka Juríková
- (Romania) Irina-Camelia Begu
