= 2005 Open Gaz de France – Singles =

Singles
- 2005 Open Gaz de France

Final
- Champion: (Russia) Dinara Safina
- Runner-up: (France) Amélie Mauresmo
- Score: 6–4, 2–6, 6–3

Details
- Draw: 28
- Seeds: 8

Events
Singles	Doubles
← 2004 ·	Open Gaz de France	· 2006 →

Kim Clijsters was the defending champion but did not compete that year.

Dinara Safina won in the final 6–4, 2–6, 6–3 against Amélie Mauresmo.

== Seeds ==
A champion seed is indicated in bold text while text in italics indicates the round in which that seed was eliminated. The top four seeds received a bye to the second round.

1. (United States) Serena Williams (quarterfinals)
2. (France) Amélie Mauresmo (final)
3. (Russia) Maria Sharapova (withdrew)
4. (Russia) Nadia Petrova (semifinals)
5. (France) Nathalie Dechy (second round)
6. (Croatia) Karolina Šprem (first round)
7. (Italy) Silvia Farina Elia (quarterfinals)
8. (Bulgaria) Magdalena Maleeva (quarterfinals)

== Draw ==
=== Key ===
- Q = Qualifier
- WC = Wild card
- LL = Lucky loser
- Alt = Alternate
- SE = Special exempt
- PR = Protected ranking
- ITF = ITF entry
- JE = Junior exempt
- w/o = Walkover
- r = Retired
- d = Defaulted
- SR = Special ranking

=== Final ===
Final
	(Russia) **Dinara Safina**	**6**	2	**6**
2	(France) Amélie Mauresmo	4	**6**	3

=== Section 1 ===
First round
(Italy) M E Camerin	6^{5}	1
WC	(France) **S Cohen-Aloro**	**7^{7}**	**6**
Q	(Russia) **V Douchevina**	**6**	2	**6**
(Czech Republic) I Benešová	4	**6**	3
(Russia) **D Safina**	**6**	**6**
6	(Croatia) K Šprem	4	2
(France) **T Golovin**	**6**	**7^{9}**
Q	(France) S Beltrame	2	6^{7}
WC	(France) **V Razzano**	**6**	**6**
(Israel) A Smashnova	2	3
(Czech Republic) K Koukalová	0	0
7	(Italy) **S Farina Elia**	**6**	**6**

Second round
1	(United States) **S Williams**	**6**	**6**
WC	(France) S Cohen-Aloro	3	2
Q	(Russia) V Douchevina	2	4
(Russia) **D Safina**	**6**	**6**
LL	(Croatia) S Mamić	3	4
(France) **T Golovin**	**6**	**6**
WC	(France) V Razzano	4	1
7	(Italy) **S Farina Elia**	**6**	**6**

Quarterfinals
1	(United States) S Williams
(Russia) **D Safina**	**w/o**
(France) **T Golovin**	**6**
7	(Italy) S Farina Elia	0	r

Semifinals
(Russia) **D Safina**	**6**	4	**7^{7}**
(France) T Golovin	1	**6**	6^{2}

=== Section 2 ===
First round
5	(France) **N Dechy**	**7**	**7^{7}**
(Croatia) J Kostanić	5	6^{4}
(Greece) E Daniilidou	3	0	r
(France) **M Bartoli**	**6**	**2**
(Italy) F Pennetta	6^{1}	4
Q	(Tunisia) **S Sfar**	**7^{7}**	**6**
8	(Bulgaria) **M Maleeva**	**7^{7}**	**7^{11}**
Q	(Luxembourg) C Schaul	6^{4}	6^{9}
(France) É Loit	4	**6**	3
(Serbia and Montenegro) **J Janković**	**6**	4	**6**
(France) **M Pierce**	**6**	**6**
(Spain) A Medina Garrigues	1	2

Second round
5	(France) N Dechy	4	2
(France) **M Bartoli**	**6**	**6**
Q	(Tunisia) S Sfar	3	3
4	(Russia) **N Petrova**	**6**	**6**
8	(Bulgaria) **M Maleeva**	**6**	**6**
(Serbia and Montenegro) J Janković	4	0
(France) M Pierce	4	3
2	(France) **A Mauresmo**	**6**	**6**

Quarterfinals
(France) M Bartoli	**6**	1	5
4	(Russia) **N Petrova**	2	**6**	**7**
8	(Bulgaria) M Maleeva	2	6^{2}
2	(France) **A Mauresmo**	**6**	**7^{7}**

Semifinals
4	(Russia) N Petrova	5	3
2	(France) **A Mauresmo**	**7**	**6**
