= 2010 GDF Suez Grand Prix – Singles =

Singles
- 2010 GDF SUEZ Grand Prix

Final
- Champion: (Hungary) Ágnes Szávay
- Runner-up: (Switzerland) Patty Schnyder
- Score: 6–2, 6–4

Details
- Draw: 32
- Seeds: 8

Events
Singles	Doubles
- GDF SUEZ Grand Prix

Seventh-seeded Ágnes Szávay successfully defended her title, winning 6–2, 6–4, against Patty Schnyder in the final.

== Seeds ==
1. (Russia) Alisa Kleybanova (second round)
2. (Romania) Alexandra Dulgheru (semifinal)
3. (Switzerland) Timea Bacsinszky (second round)
4. (Spain) Anabel Medina Garrigues (quarterfinals)
5. (China) Peng Shuai (second round)
6. (Italy) Roberta Vinci (second round)
7. (Hungary) Ágnes Szávay (champion)
8. (Slovenia) Polona Hercog (quarterfinals)

== Draw ==
Key

- Q = Qualifier
- WC = Wild card
- LL = Lucky loser
- Alt = Alternate
- ITF = ITF entry
- PR = Protected ranking
- SR = Special ranking
- SE = Special exempt
- JE = Junior exempt
- JR = Junior Accelerator Programme entrant
- CO = College Accelerator Programme entrant
- NG = Next Gen Accelerator Program entrant
- w/o = Walkover
- r = Retired
- d = Defaulted

=== Finals ===
Semifinals
(Switzerland) Patty Schnyder	6	4	6
Q	(Czech Republic) Zuzana Ondrášková	2	6	3
7	(Hungary) Ágnes Szávay	6	5	7
2	(Romania) Alexandra Dulgheru	1	7	5

Final
(Switzerland) Patty Schnyder	2	4
7	(Hungary) Ágnes Szávay	6	6

=== Top half ===
First round
1	(Russia) A Kleybanova	7	6
(Kazakhstan) S Karatantcheva	5	4
Q	(Ukraine) L Tsurenko	3	3
(Switzerland) P Schnyder	6	6
(Colombia) C Castaño	6	6
(Slovakia) K Kučová	0	3
Q	(Slovenia) A Klepač	2	1
8	(Slovenia) P Hercog	6	6
4	(Spain) A Medina Garrigues	3	6	6
(Romania) IR Olaru	6	4	0
(Hungary) G Arn	3	6	6
(Belarus) D Kustova	6	0	3
Q	(Czech Republic) Z Ondrášková	6	6
(Romania) S Cîrstea	4	2
(Italy) T Garbin	5	4
6	(Italy) R Vinci	7	6

Second round
1	(Russia) A Kleybanova	4	3
(Switzerland) P Schnyder	6	6
(Colombia) C Castaño	6	4	4
8	(Slovenia) P Hercog	4	6	6
4	(Spain) A Medina Garrigues	7	6
(Hungary) G Arn	5	3
Q	(Czech Republic) Z Ondrášková	6	6
6	(Italy) R Vinci	4	0

Quarterfinals
(Switzerland) P Schnyder	7	1	6
8	(Slovenia) P Hercog	5	6	4
4	(Spain) A Medina Garrigues	5	6	4
Q	(Czech Republic) Z Ondrášková	7	1	6

Semifinals
(Switzerland) P Schnyder	6	4	6
Q	(Czech Republic) Z Ondrášková	2	6	3

=== Bottom half ===
First round
7	(Hungary) Á Szávay	6	6
PR	(Croatia) J Kostanić Tošić	3	2
Q	(Slovakia) M Pochabová	4	5
(Austria) Y Meusburger	6	7
(Czech Republic) I Benešová	6	4	0
WC	(France) A Cornet	4	6	6
WC	(Hungary) T Babos	4	2
3	(Switzerland) T Bacsinszky	6	6
5	(China) S Peng	6	6
WC	(Croatia) S Njirić	1	3
(Belarus) A Yakimova	6	2	2
(Latvia) A Sevastova	3	6	6
(Russia) A Chakvetadze	6	6
(Ukraine) M Koryttseva	2	0
(Czech Republic) S Záhlavová	2	3
2	(Romania) A Dulgheru	6	6

Second round
7	(Hungary) Á Szávay	7	6
(Austria) Y Meusburger	5	3
WC	(France) A Cornet	6	6
3	(Switzerland) T Bacsinszky	0	4
5	(China) S Peng	1	1
(Latvia) A Sevastova	6	6
(Russia) A Chakvetadze	6^{5}	6	2
2	(Romania) A Dulgheru	7	1	6

Quarterfinals
7	(Hungary) Á Szávay	6	6
WC	(France) A Cornet	3	1
(Latvia) A Sevastova	7	2	6^{4}
2	(Romania) A Dulgheru	6^{1}	6	7

Semifinals
7	(Hungary) Á Szávay	6	5	7
2	(Romania) A Dulgheru	1	7	5
