= 2010 GDF Suez Grand Prix =

2010 GDF SUEZ Grand Prix
- Date: 5–11 July
- Edition: 15th
- Category: International
- Draw: 32S / 16D
- Prize money: $220,000
- Surface: Clay / outdoor
- Location: Budapest, Hungary

Champions

Singles
- (Hungary) Ágnes Szávay

Doubles
- (Switzerland) Timea Bacsinszky / (Italy) Tathiana Garbin
- Budapest Grand Prix

The 2010 GDF SUEZ Grand Prix was a women's tennis tournament played on outdoor clay courts. It was the 15th edition of the Budapest Grand Prix, an International-level tournament on the 2010 WTA Tour. It took place in Budapest, Hungary, from 4 July until 12 July 2010. Seventh-seeded Ágnes Szávay won the singles title, her second consecutive win at Budapest.

== Finals ==
=== Singles ===
(Hungary) Ágnes Szávay defeated (Switzerland) Patty Schnyder, 6–2, 6–4

- It was Szavay's 1st singles title of the year and 4th of her career.

=== Doubles ===
(Switzerland) Timea Bacsinszky / (Italy) Tathiana Garbin defeated (Romania) Sorana Cîrstea / (Spain) Anabel Medina Garrigues, 6–3, 6–3

== Entrants ==
=== Entry list ===
Player	Nationality	Ranking*	Seeding
Alisa Kleybanova	Russia	27	1
Alexandra Dulgheru	Romania	31	2
Timea Bacsinszky	Switzerland	37	3
Anabel Medina Garrigues	Spain	39	4
Peng Shuai	China	44	5
Roberta Vinci	Italy	49	6
Ágnes Szávay	Hungary	50	7
Polona Hercog	Slovenia	51	8

- Seedings are based on the rankings of June 21, 2010.

=== Other entrants ===
The following players received wildcards into the singles main draw:

- (Hungary) Tímea Babos
- (France) Alizé Cornet
- (Croatia) Silvia Njirić

The following players received entry from the qualifying draw:

- (Slovenia) Andreja Klepač
- (Czech Republic) Zuzana Ondrášková
- (Slovakia) Michaela Pochabová
- (Ukraine) Lesya Tsurenko
