= Miklós Hornok =

Hungarian tennis player

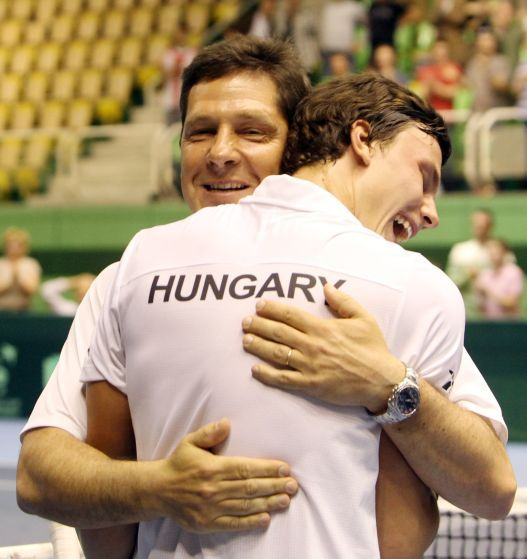
- Miklós Hornok, captain of the Hungarian Davis Cup team and his No.1 player, Marton Fucsovics (2012)
- Country (sports): Hungary(1982–85,1998)
- Born: March 19, 1965 (age 61) Budapest, Hungary
- Retired: 2002 (as a player)

Coaching career (1989–)
- Hungary Men's junior team (1989–1999),(2006–2013); Hungary Women's junior team (1999–2013); Hungary Davis Cup team (2010–2014); Gergely Kisgyörgy(1990–1991); Kyra Nagy(1991–1995); Rita Kuti-Kis(1991–1992); Réka Vidáts(1992–1994); Attila Sávolt(1992–1993); Kornél Bardóczky(1994–1997); Attila Balázs(2000–2007); György Balázs(2000–2003); Zsófia Gubacsi(2003–2007); Ágnes Szávay (2003–2005); Amir Hadad(2004–2008); Anikó Kapros(2008–2010); Márton Fucsovics (2009–2012); Katalin Marosi(several times during her career); Tímea Babos

Miklós Hornok (born March 19, 1965) is a former Hungarian tennis player, Davis Cup captain, coach, commentator.

His highest ranking was No.4 in Hungary. He was a member of the junior and national team of Hungary as well as a member of the European Team Championship national squad in 1993. He won 3 national indoor championships in singles (1989, 1990 & 1992), and 5 titles in men's doubles with Krisztián Keresztes (1 indoor and 4 outdoor). In 1999, he graduated from Semmelweis University with a Bachelor of Physical Education Degree in Budapest, majoring in Coaching.

Between 1989 and 2013, Miklós Hornok worked first as head coach of Men's, then Women's later both (men's and women's) Hungarian National junior team. During his tenure at Hungary Tennis Federation, he was available for private, semi-private and group lessons either. Meanwhile, he was appointed as the captain of the Hungary Davis Cup team from November 2010 to December 2014. He stepped down due to family reason and moved to United States where he is currently leading his own Tennis Academy. He regularly mentors and teaches aspiring tennis professionals throughout his career. In the past, he coached Ágnes Szávay, Márton Fucsovics, Anikó Kapros, Zsófia Gubacsi, Rita Kuti-Kis, Attila Sávolt, György Balázs, Attila Balázs, Réka Vidáts, Kyra Nagy, Kornél Bardóczky, Gergely Kisgyörgy, Katalin Marosi and Amir Hadad.

Hornok also served as a commentator for tennis matches on Digi Sport (Hungary) between 2012 and 2014. Andy Murray's historic win in Wimbledon in 2013 to become the first British winner of the men's singles title since Fred Perry in 1936, is considered among his most memorable coverage on that sports television.
