= 2008 Pilot Pen Tennis – Men's doubles =

Men's doubles
- 2008 Pilot Pen Tennis

Final
- Champions: (Brazil) Marcelo Melo; (Brazil) André Sá
- Runners-up: (India) Mahesh Bhupathi; (The Bahamas) Mark Knowles
- Score: 7–5, 6–2

Events
| Singles | men | women |
| Doubles | men | women |
| ← 2007 · | Pilot Pen Tennis | · 2009 → |

Mahesh Bhupathi and Nenad Zimonjić were the defending champions, but Zimonjic chose not to participate, and only Bhupathi competed that year.
Bhupathi partnered with Mark Knowles, but Marcelo Melo and André Sá defeated them 7–5, 6–2, in the final.

== Seeds ==
1. (Sweden) Simon Aspelin / (Austria) Julian Knowle (quarterfinals)
2. (India) Mahesh Bhupathi / (The Bahamas) Mark Knowles (final)
3. (Belarus) Max Mirnyi / (United Kingdom) Jamie Murray (first round)
4. (Brazil) Marcelo Melo / (Brazil) André Sá (champions)

== Draw ==
=== Key ===
- Q = Qualifier
- WC = Wild card
- LL = Lucky loser
- Alt = Alternate
- SE = Special exempt
- PR = Protected ranking
- ITF = ITF entry
- JE = Junior exempt
- w/o = Walkover
- r = Retired
- d = Defaulted
- SR = Special ranking

=== Draw ===
First round

Quarterfinals

Semifinals

Final

1
- (Sweden) S Aspelin
- (Austria) J Knowle
3

- (Czech Republic) J Levinský
- (Austria) J Melzer
1
r

1
- (Sweden) S Aspelin
- (Austria) J Knowle
4
2

- (Argentina) L Arnold Ker
- (Brazil) B Soares
6
6

- (Argentina) L Arnold Ker
- (Brazil) B Soares
6
6

- (Argentina) J Acasuso
- (Argentina) J Mónaco
2
2

- (Argentina) L Arnold Ker
- (Brazil) B Soares
5
4

4
- (Brazil) M Melo
- (Brazil) A Sá
6
6

4
- (Brazil) M Melo
- (Brazil) A Sá
7
6

WC
- (United States) A El Mihdawy
- (United States) J Levine
1
4

4
- (Brazil) M Melo
- (Brazil) A Sá
6
6

- (Argentina) A Calleri
- (Peru) L Horna
6
6

- (Argentina) A Calleri
- (Peru) L Horna
4
1

- (Croatia) I Karlović
- (Croatia) L Zovko
4
3

4
- (Brazil) M Melo
- (Brazil) A Sá
7
6

- (Italy) S Bolelli
- (Italy) A Seppi
6
7

2
- (India) M Bhupathi
- (The Bahamas) M Knowles
5
2

WC
- (United States) B Battistone
- (United States) D Battistone
3
5

- (Italy) S Bolelli
- (Italy) A Seppi
7
6^{2}
[13]

- (Spain) G García López
- (Spain) F Verdasco
6^{4}
7
[10]

- (Spain) G García López
- (Spain) F Verdasco
6^{5}
7
[11]

3
- (Belarus) M Mirnyi
- (United Kingdom) J Murray
7
5
[8]

- (Italy) S Bolelli
- (Italy) A Seppi
3
7
[7]

- (United States) J Cerretani
- (Slovakia) F Polášek
2
4

2
- (India) M Bhupathi
- (The Bahamas) M Knowles
6
5
[10]

- (United States) E Butorac
- (United States) S Lipsky
6
6

- (United States) E Butorac
- (United States) S Lipsky
4
4

- (France) M Gicquel
- (France) N Mahut
2
3

2
- (India) M Bhupathi
- (The Bahamas) M Knowles
6
6

2
- (India) M Bhupathi
- (The Bahamas) M Knowles
6
6
