= 2007 Open Gaz de France =

- Date: 5–11 February
- Edition: 15th
- Category: Tier II
- Draw: 28S / 16D
- Prize money: $600,000
- Location: Paris, France
- Venue: Stade Pierre de Coubertin

Champions

Singles
- (Russia) Nadia Petrova

Doubles
- (Zimbabwe) Cara Black / (South Africa) Liezel Huber
← 2006 ·	Open Gaz de France	· 2008 →

The 2007 Open Gaz de France was a women's tennis tournament played on indoor hard courts. It was the 15th edition of the event and was part of the Tier II series of the 2007 WTA Tour. It took place at the Stade Pierre de Coubertin in Paris, France, from 5 February through 11 February 2007. Fourth-seeded Nadia Petrova won the singles title.

== Finals ==
=== Singles ===
(Russia) Nadia Petrova defeated (Czech Republic) Lucie Šafářová 4–6, 6–1, 6–4

- It was Nadia Petrova's 1st title of the year and her 7th overall.

=== Doubles ===
(Zimbabwe) Cara Black / (South Africa) Liezel Huber defeated (Czech Republic) Gabriela Navrátilová / (Czech Republic) Vladimíra Uhlířová 6–2, 6–0
