= 2008 Open Gaz de France =

- Date: 4–10 February
- Edition: 16th
- Category: Tier II
- Draw: 28S / 16D
- Prize money: $600,000
- Surface: Hard / indoor
- Location: Paris, France

Champions

Singles
- (Russia) Anna Chakvetadze

Doubles
- (Ukraine) Alona Bondarenko / (Ukraine) Kateryna Bondarenko
← 2007 ·	Open Gaz de France	· 2009 →

The 2008 Open Gaz de France is the 2008 Tier II WTA Tour tournament of the annually-held Open Gaz de France tennis tournament. It was held from 4 February through 10 February 2008.

The total prize money for the tournament was US$600,000 with the winner of the singles receiving $95,500 and the losing finalist $51,000. The winners of the doubles competition received $30,000.

Seven of the top twenty players in the world competed in the tournament. Among them were Daniela Hantuchová and Ágnes Szávay. There was a strong Russian presence on display, with Anna Chakvetadze, Elena Dementieva and defending champion Nadia Petrova all present. Local fans had Marion Bartoli, Amélie Mauresmo and Virginie Razzano to support.

== Finals ==
=== Singles ===
(Russia) Anna Chakvetadze defeated (Hungary) Ágnes Szávay 6–3, 2–6, 6–2

- It was Chakvetadze's first title of the year, and 7th of her career.

=== Doubles ===
(Ukraine) Alona Bondarenko / (Ukraine) Kateryna Bondarenko defeated (Czech Republic) Eva Hrdinová / (Czech Republic) Vladimíra Uhlířová 6–1, 6–4
