= 2009 GDF SUEZ Grand Prix – Singles =

Singles
- 2009 GDF SUEZ Grand Prix

Final
- Champion: (Hungary) Ágnes Szávay
- Runner-up: (Switzerland) Patty Schnyder
- Score: 2–6, 6–4, 6–2

Details
- Draw: 32
- Seeds: 8

Events
Singles	Doubles
- GDF SUEZ Grand Prix

The 2009 GDF SUEZ Grand Prix – Singles was one of the events of the 2009 GDF SUEZ Grand Prix women's tennis tournament, played on outdoor clay courts in Budapest, Hungary from 4 July until 12 July 2009. The draw consisted of 32 players and 8 of them were seeded. Alizé Cornet was the defending champion, but lost in the second round to Shahar Pe'er.

Fourth-seeded Ágnes Szávay won in the final 2–6, 6–4, 6–2 against Patty Schnyder.

== Seeds ==
1. (Switzerland) Patty Schnyder (final)
2. (France) Alizé Cornet (second round)
3. (Austria) Sybille Bammer (second round)
4. (Hungary) Ágnes Szávay (champion)
5. (Russia) Alisa Kleybanova (quarterfinals)
6. (Ukraine) Alona Bondarenko (semifinals)
7. (Italy) Sara Errani (first round)
8. (Czech Republic) Lucie Šafářová (first round)

== Draw ==
Key

- Q = Qualifier
- WC = Wild card
- LL = Lucky loser
- Alt = Alternate
- ITF = ITF entry
- PR = Protected ranking
- SR = Special ranking
- SE = Special exempt
- JE = Junior exempt
- JR = Junior Accelerator Programme entrant
- CO = College Accelerator Programme entrant
- NG = Next Gen Accelerator Program entrant
- w/o = Walkover
- r = Retired
- d = Defaulted

=== Finals ===
Semifinals
1/WC	(Switzerland) Patty Schnyder	6	6
(Romania) Edina Gallovits	2	4
4	(Hungary) Ágnes Szávay	6	6
6	(Ukraine) Alona Bondarenko	1	2

Final
1/WC	(Switzerland) Patty Schnyder	6	4	2
4	(Hungary) Ágnes Szávay	2	6	6

=== Top half ===
First round
1/WC	(Switzerland) P Schnyder	7	6
(Germany) A Petkovic	6^{3}	3
(Spain) L Domínguez Lino	6	0	1
(Italy) ME Camerin	4	6	6
LL	(Slovakia) L Juríková	3	6	4
(Ukraine) K Bondarenko	6	1	6
(Romania) M Niculescu	0	3
5	(Russia) A Kleybanova	6	6
3	(Austria) S Bammer	6	6
(Czech Republic) K Zakopalová	2	3
(Bulgaria) T Pironkova	5	2
(Romania) E Gallovits	7	6
(Russia) A Lapushchenkova	4	2
(Ukraine) M Koryttseva	6	6
Q	(Croatia) P Martić	7	6
8	(Czech Republic) L Šafářová	6^{5}	0

Second round
1/WC	(Switzerland) P Schnyder	6	6
(Italy) ME Camerin	3	2
(Ukraine) K Bondarenko	6	4	4
5	(Russia) A Kleybanova	4	6	6
3	(Austria) S Bammer	6	5	2
(Romania) E Gallovits	4	7	6
(Ukraine) M Koryttseva	3	2
Q	(Croatia) P Martić	6	6

Quarterfinals
1/WC	(Switzerland) P Schnyder	5	7	6
5	(Russia) A Kleybanova	7	5	2
(Romania) E Gallovits	6	7
Q	(Croatia) P Martić	3	6^{8}

Semifinals
1/WC	(Switzerland) P Schnyder	6	6
(Romania) E Gallovits	2	4

=== Bottom half ===
First round
7	(Italy) S Errani	7	4	0
Q	(Switzerland) T Bacsinszky	5	6	6
(Austria) P Mayr	6	7
Q	(Georgia (country)) M Chakhnashvili	0	5
(Italy) T Garbin	6	6
Q	(Canada) S Fichman	1	4
WC	(Hungary) K Marosi	1	1
4	(Hungary) Á Szávay	6	6
6	(Ukraine) A Bondarenko	4	7	6
(Croatia) K Šprem	6	5	1
(Romania) IR Olaru	6	6
WC	(Hungary) G Arn	2	2
LL	(Romania) I-C Begu	1	6	4
(Israel) S Pe'er	6	4	6
(Kazakhstan) G Voskoboeva	3	1
2	(France) A Cornet	6	6

Second round
Q	(Switzerland) T Bacsinszky	0	6	6
(Austria) P Mayr	6	3	4
(Italy) T Garbin	6^{2}	7	5
4	(Hungary) Á Szávay	7	5	7
6	(Ukraine) A Bondarenko	6	4	6
(Romania) IR Olaru	4	6	4
(Israel) S Pe'er	6	6
2	(France) A Cornet	2	0

Quarterfinals
Q	(Switzerland) T Bacsinszky	2	3
4	(Hungary) Á Szávay	6	6
6	(Ukraine) A Bondarenko	7	6
(Israel) S Pe'er	5	1

Semifinals
4	(Hungary) Á Szávay	6	6
6	(Ukraine) A Bondarenko	1	2
