= 2008 Open Gaz de France – Doubles =

Tennis tournament event

Doubles
- 2008 Open Gaz de France

Final
- Champion: (Ukraine) Alona Bondarenko (Ukraine) Kateryna Bondarenko
- Runner-up: (Czech Republic) Eva Hrdinová (Czech Republic) Vladimíra Uhlířová
- Score: 6–1, 6–4

Events
Singles	Doubles
- Open Gaz de France

Cara Black and Liezel Huber were the defending champions, but the pair lost in the first round to Julie Ditty and Yuliana Fedak.

Alona Bondarenko and Kateryna Bondarenko won the title, defeating Eva Hrdinová and Vladimíra Uhlířová in the final 6–1, 6–4.

== Seeds ==
1. (Zimbabwe) Cara Black & (United States) Liezel Huber (first round)
2. (Czech Republic) Květa Peschke & (Slovenia) Katarina Srebotnik (semifinals)
3. (Ukraine) Alona Bondarenko & (Ukraine) Kateryna Bondarenko
4. (Slovakia) Janette Husárová & (Spain) Anabel Medina Garrigues (quarterfinals)

=== Key ===
- Q - Qualifier
- WC - Wild card
- Alt - Alternates

== Draw ==
First round
1	(Zimbabwe) C Black (United States) L Huber	4	6	[5]
(United States) J Ditty (Ukraine) Y Fedak	6	0	[10]
(Czech Republic) E Hrdinová (Czech Republic) V Uhlířová	6	4	[12]
(Switzerland) T Bacsinszky (France) A Védy	3	6	[10]
4	(Slovakia) J Husárová (Spain) A Medina Garrigues	7	0	[11]
(Belarus) E Dzehalevich (Russia) A Kleybanova	5	6	[9]
(France) S Brémond (Russia) A Jidkova	6^{2}	1
(Bosnia and Herzegovina) M Jugić-Salkić (Czech Republic) G Navrátilová	7^{7}	6
(Georgia (country)) M Chakhnashvilia (Belgium) D Feys	6^{4}	2
(Russia) E Likhovtseva (Russia) G Voskoboeva	7^{7}	6
WC	(France) S Cohen-Aloro (France) C Pin	6^{1}	3
3	(Ukraine) A Bondarenko (Ukraine) K Bondarenko	7^{7}	6
(Italy) T Garbin (United States) M Tu	6	6
(France) S Foretz (Tunisia) S Sfar	3	4
(Greece) E Daniilidou (Germany) J Wöhr	5	3
2	(Czech Republic) K Peschke (Slovenia) K Srebotnik	7	6

Quarterfinals
(United States) J Ditty (Ukraine) Y Fedak	6	1	[5]
(Czech Republic) E Hrdinová (Czech Republic) V Uhlířová	4	6	[10]
4	(Slovakia) J Husárová (Spain) A Medina Garrigues	4	6	[12]
(Bosnia and Herzegovina) M Jugić-Salkić (Czech Republic) G Navrátilová	6	4	[14]
(Russia) E Likhovtseva (Russia) G Voskoboeva	3	2
3	(Ukraine) A Bondarenko (Ukraine) K Bondarenko	6	6
(Italy) T Garbin (United States) M Tu	6	1	[6]
2	(Czech Republic) K Peschke (Slovenia) K Srebotnik	4	6	[10]

Semifinals
(Czech Republic) E Hrdinová (Czech Republic) V Uhlířová	7	6
(Bosnia and Herzegovina) M Jugić-Salkić (Czech Republic) G Navrátilová	5	1
3	(Ukraine) A Bondarenko (Ukraine) K Bondarenko
2	(Czech Republic) K Peschke (Slovenia) K Srebotnik	w	/	o

Finals
(Czech Republic) E Hrdinová (Czech Republic) V Uhlířová	1	4
3	(Ukraine) A Bondarenko (Ukraine) K Bondarenko	6	6
