= 2008 Open Gaz de France – Singles =

Singles
- 2008 Open Gaz de France

Final
- Champion: (Russia) Anna Chakvetadze
- Runner-up: (Hungary) Ágnes Szávay
- Score: 6–3, 2–6, 6–2

Details
- Draw: 28
- Seeds: 8

Events
Singles	Doubles
- Open Gaz de France

Nadia Petrova was the defending champion, but lost in the first round to Kateryna Bondarenko.

Anna Chakvetadze won the title, defeating Ágnes Szávay in the final 6–3, 2–6, 6–2.

== Seeds ==
1. (Russia) Anna Chakvetadze (champion)
2. (Slovakia) Daniela Hantuchová (quarterfinals)
3. (France) Marion Bartoli (semifinals)
4. (Russia) Elena Dementieva (semifinals)
5. (Russia) Nadia Petrova (first round)
6. (France) Amélie Mauresmo (quarterfinals)
7. (Hungary) Ágnes Szávay (finals)
8. (Ukraine) Alona Bondarenko (first round)

== Draws ==
=== Key ===
- Q - Qualifier
- WC - Wild Card

=== Finals ===
Semifinals
1	(Russia) Anna Chakvetadze	2	6	6
3	(France) Marion Bartoli	6	2	0
4	(Russia) Elena Dementieva	3	6	5
7	(Hungary) Ágnes Szávay	6	1	7

Finals
1	(Russia) Anna Chakvetadze	6	2	6
7	(Hungary) Ágnes Szávay	3	6	2

=== Section 1 ===
First round
WC	(France) N Dechy	6	7^{10}
(China) P Shuai	4	6^{8}
(Belarus) V Azarenka	6	2	5
(Greece) E Daniilidou	2	6	7
Q	(United States) J Ditty	1	2
6	(France) A Mauresmo	6	6
WC	(France) C Pin	5	3
(Slovakia) D Cibulková	7	6
(France) A Cornet	4	6	6
Q	(Czech Republic) K Zakopalová	6	2	1
(France) V Razzano	6	4	7
8	(Ukraine) A Bondarenko	2	6	5

Second round
1	(Russia) A Chakvetadze	6	6
WC	(France) N Dechy	1	3
(Greece) E Daniilidou	0^{r}
6	(France) A Mauresmo	3
3	(France) M Bartoli	7	6
(Slovakia) D Cibulková	5	1
(France) A Cornet	4	5
(France) V Razzano	6	7

Quarter-Finals
1	(Russia) A Chakvetadze	3	6	6
6	(France) A Mauresmo	6	3	3
3	(France) M Bartoli	6	7^{7}
(France) V Razzano	1	6^{3}

Semi-Finals
1	(Russia) A Chakvetadze	2	6	6
3	(France) M Bartoli	6	2	0

=== Section 2 ===
First round
5	(Russia) N Petrova	6^{4}	6	4
(Ukraine) K Bondarenko	7^{7}	3	6
Q	(Ukraine) Y Fedak	7^{9}	4	6
(Italy) K Knapp	6^{7}	6	2
Q	(Czech Republic) P Kvitová	6	6
(Spain) A Medina Garrigues	2	3
7	(Hungary) Á Szávay	6	6
(Belarus) O Govortsova	1	1
(United States) M Tu	3	4
(Italy) T Garbin	6	6
(Slovenia) K Srebotnik	6	6
(France) É Loit	2	4

Second round
(Ukraine) K Bondarenko	6	6
Q	(Ukraine) Y Fedak	0	3
Q	(Czech Republic) P Kvitová	6^{7}	2
4	(Russia) E Dementieva	7^{9}	6
7	(Hungary) Á Szávay	6	4	6
(Italy) T Garbin	3	6	2
(Slovenia) K Srebotnik	4	6	3
2	(Slovakia) D Hantuchová	6	1	6

Quarter-Finals
(Ukraine) K Bondarenko	5	2
4	(Russia) E Dementieva	7	6
7	(Hungary) Á Szávay	7^{7}	6
2	(Slovakia) D Hantuchová	6^{4}	1

Semi-Finals
4	(Russia) E Dementieva	3	6	5
7	(Hungary) Á Szávay	6	1	7
