= Ágnes Szávay =

Hungarian tennis player (born 1988)

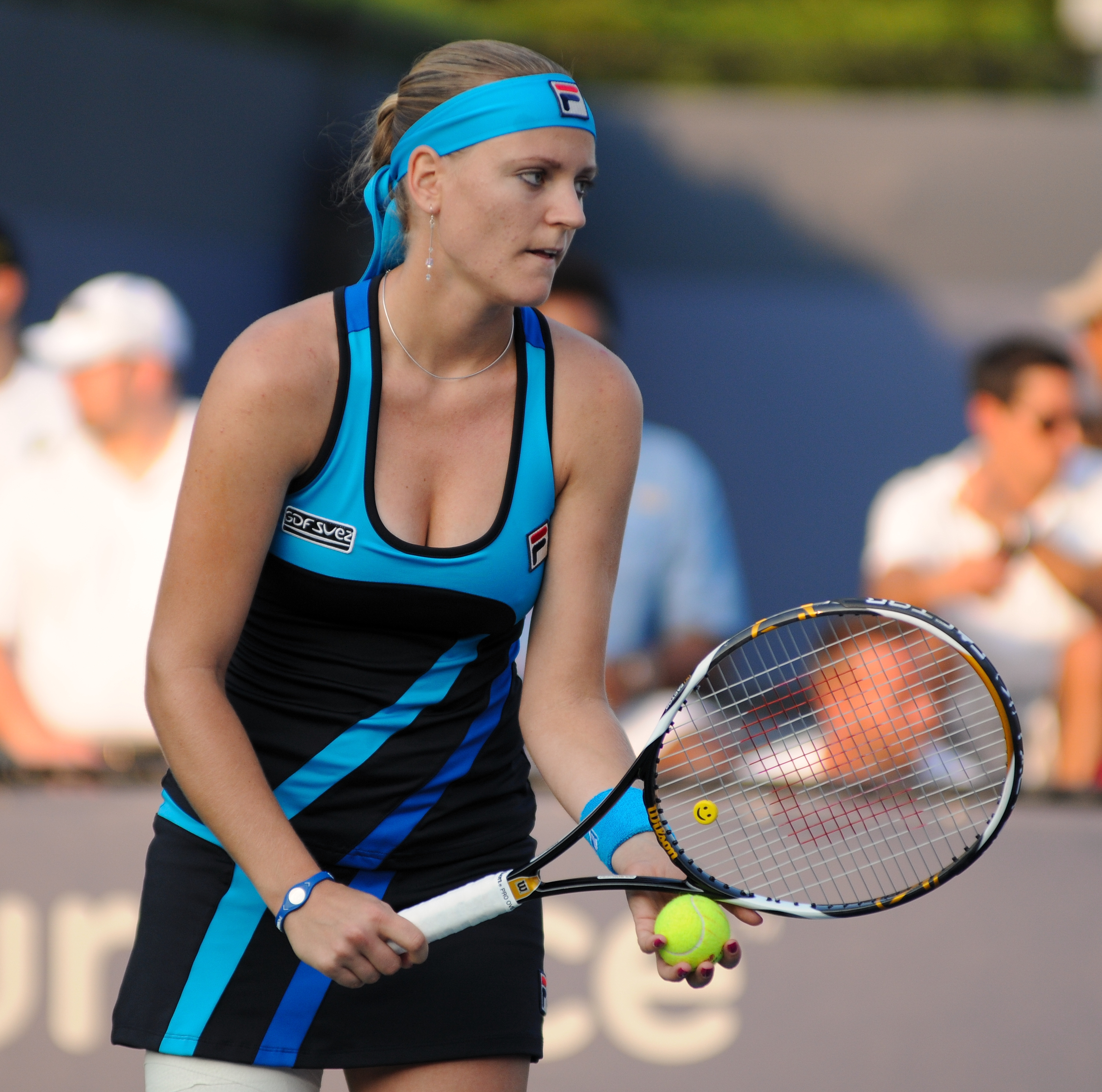
- Szávay at the 2010 US Open
- Country (sports): Hungary
- Born: 29 December 1988 (age 37) Kiskunhalas, Hungary
- Height: 1.71 m (5 ft 7 in)
- Turned pro: 2004
- Retired: 6 February 2013
- Plays: Right (two-handed backhand)
- Prize money: $2,120,121

Singles
- Career record: 219–125
- Career titles: 5
- Highest ranking: No. 13 (14 April 2008)

Grand Slam singles results
- Australian Open: 2R (2010)
- French Open: 4R (2009)
- Wimbledon: 4R (2008)
- US Open: QF (2007)

Other tournaments
- Olympic Games: 1R (2008)

Doubles
- Career record: 101–78
- Career titles: 2
- Highest ranking: No. 22 (24 September 2007)

Grand Slam doubles results
- Australian Open: 3R (2006, 2009)
- French Open: 3R (2007, 2008)
- Wimbledon: QF (2010)
- US Open: SF (2007)

Ágnes Szávay (Hungarian: Szávay Ágnes, pronounced [ˈsaːvɒi ˈaːɡnɛʃ]; born 29 December 1988) is a former professional tennis player from Hungary. The 2007 WTA Newcomer of the Year achieved her career-high ranking of world No. 13 in April 2008.

== Personal life ==
Szávay was born in Kiskunhalas and grew up in Soltvadkert. She started to play tennis at the age of six, with her parents acting as her first coaches and managers. She worked with several coaches including Zoltán Újhidy, Levente Barátosi, Miklós Hornok, József Bocskay, Zoltán Kuhárszky, Karl-Heinz Wetter and Gábor Köves. Her younger sister Blanka, who is also a professional tennis player, is five years her junior.

== Tennis career ==
=== 2006: Challenger final ===
In 2006, she made it to the final of the Ashland Challenger tournament, but lost there to Aleksandra Wozniak in straight sets.

=== 2007: First WTA Tour titles ===
Szávay won her first career WTA-level tournament in singles in Palermo in July. The win caused her ranking to rise to world No. 37. She also won one doubles tournament, the Tier III Budapest Grand Prix, with Vladimíra Uhlířová.

In August, Szávay reached the final of the Tier II tournament in New Haven, defeating Daniela Hantuchová, Alona Bondarenko, and Samantha Stosur, then lost to Svetlana Kuznetsova in the final. Szávay was leading 6–4, 0–3 when she had to retire from the match because of a back injury.

Szávay reached the quarterfinals of the US Open, defeating 32nd-seeded Michaëlla Krajicek and seventh-seeded Nadia Petrova, then lost to Kuznetsova. She also reached the semifinals in women's doubles, teaming with Uhlířová.

At her first tournament after the US Open, she reached the final of the Tier II China Open. Szávay, the sixth seed, reached the semifinals where she defeated Chinese player Peng Shuai to advance to her second career Tier II final. Szávay then defeated Jelena Janković to claim her first Tier II title. Szávay led 5–0 in the first set tiebreak before losing it 7–9. In the second set, Szávay saved a match point while trailing 5–1 with a second serve ace and then won nine consecutive games. Szávay moved into the top 20 due to this result.

Szávay's year ended prematurely because of a thigh injury. In late September at the Tier IV Hansol Korea Open Tennis Championships in Seoul, she was forced to retire from her quarterfinal match with Eleni Daniilidou while tied at one set apiece. She did not play on the tour the remainder of the year.

For her achievements, she was named "2007 Hungarian Sportswoman of the Year".

=== 2008: Top-15 ===
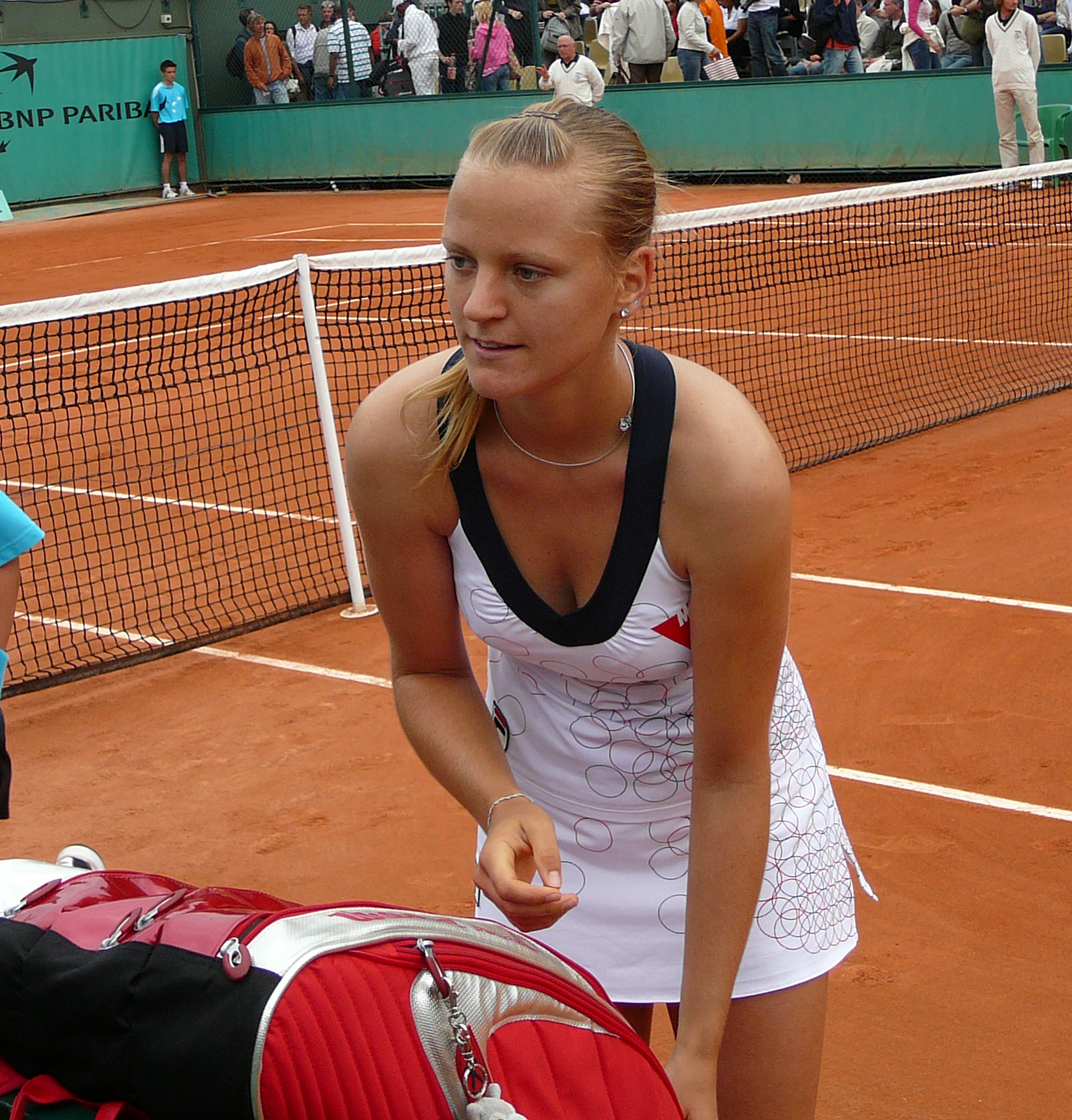
Ágnes Szávay at Roland Garros, 2008

Szávay began the year at the Mondial Australian Women's Hardcourt in Gold Coast. Szávay and Dinara Safina, the third seeded team, won the doubles title, defeating the first and second seeded teams in the semifinals and final, respectively.

Szávay reached the final of the Tier II Open Gaz de France in Paris. She defeated second-seeded Daniela Hantuchová in the quarterfinals and fourth-seeded Elena Dementieva in the semifinals, then lost to Anna Chakvetadze in the three-set final.

Szávay started the clay court season by reaching the quarterfinals in three consecutive tournaments. At the Tier II Bausch & Lomb Championships in Amelia Island, Szávay lost to Lindsay Davenport in the quarterfinals. Going into the Tier I Family Circle Cup in Charleston, Szávay was ranked world No. 13, her highest singles ranking; she reached the quarterfinals but eventually lost to Alizé Cornet in two sets. At the Tier I Qatar Telecom German Open in Berlin, Szávay lost to world No. 2 Ana Ivanovic in three sets.

=== 2009: Budapest title ===
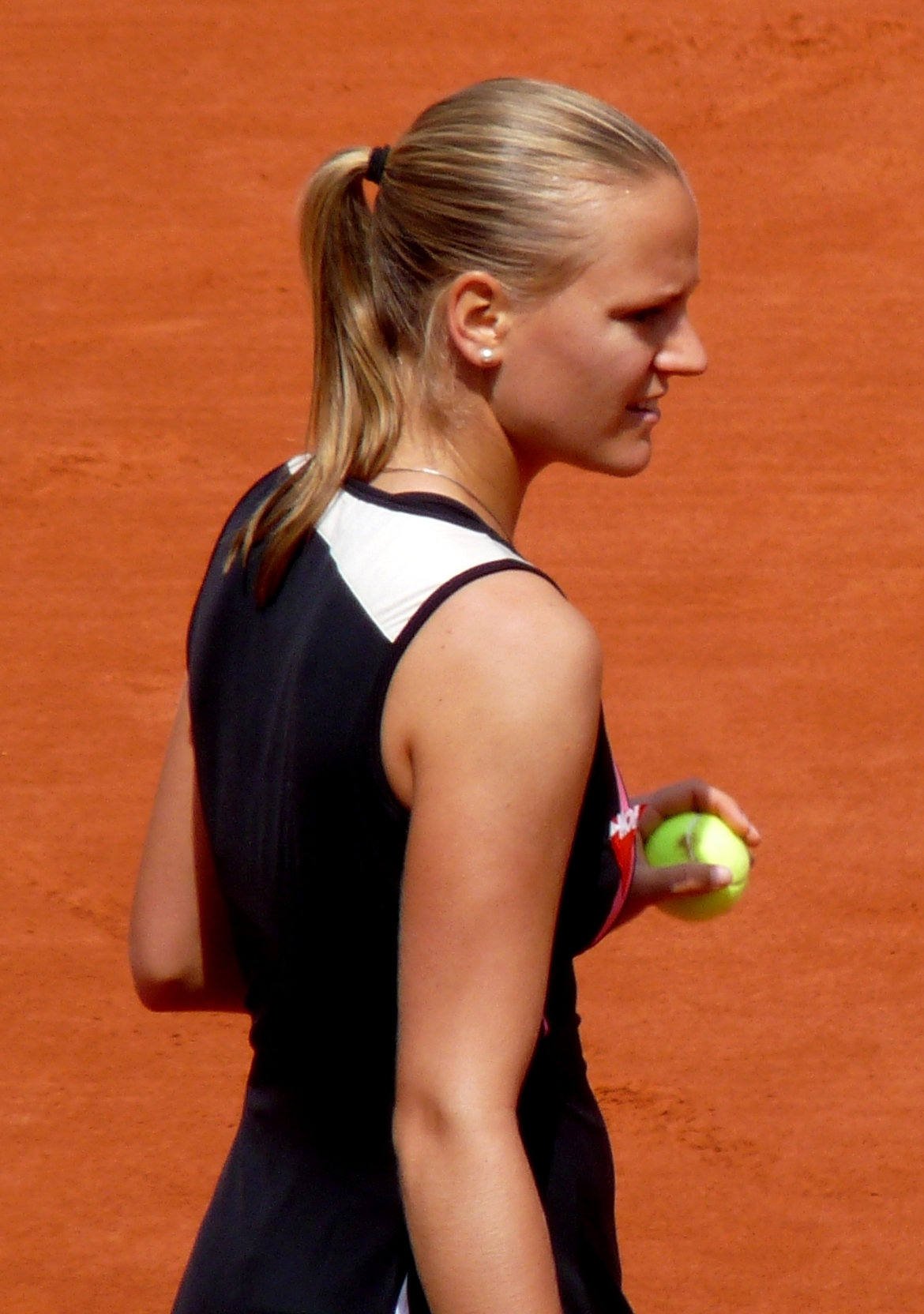
Szávay at the 2009 French Open

At the 2009 French Open, Szávay was seeded 29th and upset world No. 3 Venus Williams, beating her in the third round. She was defeated in straight sets by Dominika Cibulková in the fourth round. She won the third title of her career in her home nation at GDF Suez Grand Prix in Budapest, defeating top seed Patty Schnyder in the final.

=== 2010: Two more WTA singles titles ===
Szávay reached her first quarterfinals of the year at the Open GDF Suez and then reached the quarterfinals at the Abierto Mexicano TELCEL and the Monterrey Open. In the summer, she won back-to-back titles at the GDF Suez Grand Prix and the ECM Prague Open.

=== 2011: Back injury ===
Szávay won her first match in nearly five months at the BNP Paribas Open. After the French Open, she took time off to recover from a back injury.

=== 2012: Loss of form ===
Szávay lost in several first rounds, including the Porsche Tennis Grand Prix, the Olympics, the New Haven Open at Yale, and the US Open.

=== 2013: Retirement ===
On 6 February 2013, Szávay announced retirement from professional tennis due to ongoing back problems.

== Career statistics ==
=== Grand Slam performance timelines ===
Key
W	F	SF	QF	#R	RR	Q#	P#	DNQ	A	Z#	PO	G	S	B	NMS	NTI	P	NH

(W) winner; (F) finalist; (SF) semifinalist; (QF) quarterfinalist; (#R) rounds 4, 3, 2, 1; (RR) round-robin stage; (Q#) qualification round; (P#) preliminary round; (DNQ) did not qualify; (A) absent; (Z#) Davis/Fed Cup Zonal Group (with number indication) or (PO) play-off; (G) gold, (S) silver or (B) bronze Olympic/Paralympic medal; (NMS) not a Masters tournament; (NTI) not a Tier I tournament; (P) postponed; (NH) not held; (SR) strike rate (events won / competed); (W–L) win–loss record.
To avoid confusion and double counting, these charts are updated at the conclusion of a tournament or when the player's participation has ended.

==== Singles ====
Tournament	2005	2006	2007	2008	2009	2010	2011	2012	W-L
Australian Open	A	Q1	Q2	1R	1R	2R	A	A	1–3
French Open	A	Q3	2R	3R	4R	2R	1R	A	7–5
Wimbledon	A	A	2R	4R	1R	1R	A	A	4–4
US Open	Q1	A	QF	2R	1R	2R	A	1R	6–5
Win–loss	0–0	0–0	6–3	6–4	3–4	3–4	0–1	0–1	18–17

==== Doubles ====
Tournament	2006	2007	2008	2009	2010	2011	2012	W-L
Australian Open	3R	2R	1R	3R	2R	A	A	6–5
French Open	1R	3R	3R	2R	2R	A	A	6–5
Wimbledon	A	2R	3R	1R	QF	A	A	6–4
US Open	A	SF	A	2R	A	A	1R	5–3
Win–loss	2–2	8–4	4–3	4–4	5–3	0–0	0–1	23–17

Awards
Preceded by Tímea Nagy	Hungarian Sportswoman of The Year; 2007	Succeeded by Ildikó Mincza-Nébald
Preceded by Agnieszka Radwańska	WTA Newcomer of the Year; 2007	Succeeded by Caroline Wozniacki
