= 1998 Open Gaz de France =

- Date: 9–15 February
- Edition: 6th
- Category: Tier II
- Surface: Carpet / indoor
- Location: Paris, France
- Venue: Stade Pierre de Coubertin

Champions

Singles
- (France) Mary Pierce

Doubles
- (Belgium) Sabine Appelmans / (Netherlands) Miriam Oremans
← 1997 ·	Open Gaz de France	· 1999 →

The 1998 Open Gaz de France was a women's tennis tournament played on indoor carpet courts at the Stade Pierre de Coubertin in Paris, France, that was part of Tier II of the 1998 WTA Tour. It was the sixth edition of the tournament and was held from 9 February until 15 February 1998. Mary Pierce won the singles title.

== Finals ==
=== Singles ===
(France) Mary Pierce defeated (Belgium) Dominique Van Roost 6–3, 7–5

- It was Pierce's 1st title of the year and the 12th of her career.

=== Doubles ===
(Belgium) Sabine Appelmans / (Netherlands) Miriam Oremans defeated (Russia) Anna Kournikova / (Latvia) Larisa Savchenko 1–6, 6–3, 7–6

- It was Appelmans' 1st title of the year and the 9th of her career. It was Oremans' 1st title of the year and the 2nd of her career.
