= 1994 Open Gaz de France =

- Date: 15–20 February
- Edition: 2nd
- Category: Tier II
- Draw: 32S /16D
- Prize money: $400,000
- Surface: Carpet / indoor
- Location: Paris, France
- Venue: Stade Pierre de Coubertin

Champions

Singles
- (United States) Martina Navratilova

Doubles
- (Belgium) Sabine Appelmans / (Belgium) Laurence Courtois
← 1993 ·	Open Gaz de France	· 1995 →

The 1994 Open Gaz de France was a women's tennis tournament played on indoor carpet courts at the Stade Pierre de Coubertin in Paris, France that was part of Tier II of the 1994 WTA Tour. It was the 2nd edition of the tournament and was held from 15 February until 20 February 1994. First-seeded Martina Navratilova won the singles title and earned $80,000 first-prize money.

== Finals ==
=== Singles ===
(United States) Martina Navratilova defeated (France) Julie Halard 7–5, 6–3

- It was Navratilova's 1st title of the year and the 336th of her career.

=== Doubles ===
(Belgium) Sabine Appelmans / (Belgium) Laurence Courtois defeated (France) Mary Pierce / (Hungary) Andrea Temesvári 6–4, 6–4

- It was Appelmans' 2nd title of the year and the 5th of her career. It was Courtois' only title of the year and the 1st of her career.
