= 2010 Open GDF Suez – Doubles =

Doubles
- 2010 Open GDF Suez

Final
- Champions: (Czech Republic) Iveta Benešová (Czech Republic) Barbora Záhlavová-Strýcová
- Runners-up: (Zimbabwe) Cara Black (United States) Liezel Huber
- Score: w/o

Events
Singles	Doubles
← 2009 ·	Open GDF Suez	· 2011 →

Following are the results of the 2010 Open GDF Suez doubles. The 2010 Open GDF Suez was a women's professional tennis tournament played on indoor hard courts. It was the 18th edition of the Open GDF Suez (formerly known as the Open Gaz de France) and was a Premier tournament on the 2010 WTA Tour. It took place at Stade Pierre de Coubertin in Paris, France from February 8 through February 14, 2010.

Cara Black and Liezel Huber were the defending champions. However, they withdrew before their match against Iveta Benešová and Barbora Záhlavová-Strýcová in the final for reasons of Black's health.

== Seeds ==
1. (Zimbabwe) Cara Black / (United States) Liezel Huber (final, withdrew)
2. (Czech Republic) Iveta Benešová / (Czech Republic) Barbora Záhlavová-Strýcová (champions)
3. (Poland) Klaudia Jans / (Poland) Alicja Rosolska (semifinals)
4. (United Kingdom) Sarah Borwell / (United States) Raquel Kops-Jones (first round)

== Draw ==
=== Key ===
- Q = Qualifier
- WC = Wild card
- LL = Lucky loser
- Alt = Alternate
- SE = Special exempt
- PR = Protected ranking
- ITF = ITF entry
- JE = Junior exempt
- w/o = Walkover
- r = Retired
- d = Defaulted
- SR = Special ranking

=== Draw ===
First round
1	(Zimbabwe) C Black (United States) L Huber	6	6
WC	(France) J Coin (France) A Cornet	3	3
(Czech Republic) K Peschke (Slovenia) K Srebotnik	6	6
(France) A Védy (United States) R Zalameda	1	3
3	(Poland) K Jans (Poland) A Rosolska	3	6	[10]
(Czech Republic) V Uhlířová (Czech Republic) R Voráčová	6	4	[6]
(Switzerland) T Bacsinszky (Tunisia) S Sfar	6	5	[12]
(Russia) M Kondratieva (France) S Lefèvre	4	7	[10]
(Belarus) O Govortsova (Belarus) T Poutchek	6	2	[10]
(Ukraine) Y Beygelzimer (Belarus) D Kustova	2	6	[7]
(Croatia) D Jurak (Hungary) K Marosi	7	2	[10]
4	(United Kingdom) S Borwell (United States) R Kops-Jones	6^{7}	6	[3]
(Austria) S Klemenschits (Slovenia) A Klepač	1	3
(Latvia) L Dekmeijere (South Africa) N Grandin	6	6
(Russia) A Pavlyuchenkova (Turkey) İ Şenoğlu	2	3
2	(Czech Republic) I Benešová (Czech Republic) B Záhlavová-Strýcová	6	6

Quarterfinals
1	(Zimbabwe) C Black (United States) L Huber	7	6
(Czech Republic) K Peschke (Slovenia) K Srebotnik	6^{6}	3
3	(Poland) K Jans (Poland) A Rosolska	6	6
(Switzerland) T Bacsinszky (Tunisia) S Sfar	3	3
(Belarus) O Govortsova (Belarus) T Poutchek	3	6	[11]
(Croatia) D Jurak (Hungary) K Marosi	6	1	[9]
(Latvia) L Dekmeijere (South Africa) N Grandin	4	6	[7]
2	(Czech Republic) I Benešová (Czech Republic) B Záhlavová-Strýcová	6	3	[10]

Semifinals
1	(Zimbabwe) C Black (United States) L Huber	6	6
3	(Poland) K Jans (Poland) A Rosolska	3	3
(Belarus) O Govortsova (Belarus) T Poutchek	3	3
2	(Czech Republic) I Benešová (Czech Republic) B Záhlavová-Strýcová	6	6

Finals
1	(Zimbabwe) C Black (United States) L Huber
2	(Czech Republic) I Benešová (Czech Republic) B Záhlavová-Strýcová	w/o
