= 1996 Open Gaz de France =

- Date: 13–18 February
- Edition: 4th
- Category: Tier II
- Draw: 28S / 16D
- Prize money: $450,000
- Surface: Carpet / indoor
- Location: Paris, France
- Venue: Stade Pierre de Coubertin

Champions

Singles
- (France) Julie Halard-Decugis

Doubles
- (Netherlands) Kristie Boogert / (Czech Republic) Jana Novotná
← 1995 ·	Open Gaz de France	· 1997 →

The 1996 Open Gaz de France was a women's tennis tournament played on indoor carpet courts at the Stade Pierre de Coubertin in Paris in France that was part of the Tier II category of the 1996 WTA Tour. It was the fourth edition of the tournament and was held from 13 February until 18 February 1996. Unseeded Julie Halard-Decugis won the singles title.

== Finals ==
=== Singles ===
(France) Julie Halard-Decugis defeated (Croatia) Iva Majoli 7–5, 7–6^{(7–4)}

- It was Halard-Decugis' 2nd and last singles title of the year and the 6th of her career.

=== Doubles ===
(Netherlands) Kristie Boogert / (Czech Republic) Jana Novotná defeated (France) Julie Halard-Decugis / (France) Nathalie Tauziat 6–4, 6–3

- It was Boogert's 1st doubles title of the year and of her career. It was Novotná's 1st doubles title of the year and the 56th of her career.
