= 1994 Open Gaz de France – Singles =

Singles
- 1994 Open Gaz de France

Final
- Champion: (United States) Martina Navratilova
- Runner-up: (France) Julie Halard
- Score: 7–5, 6–3

Details
- Draw: 32
- Seeds: 8

Events
Singles	Doubles
← 1993 ·	Open Gaz de France	· 1995 →

Martina Navratilova was the defending champion and won in the final 7–5, 6–3 against Julie Halard.

== Seeds ==
A champion seed is indicated in bold text while text in italics indicates the round in which that seed was eliminated.

1. (United States) **Martina Navratilova (champion)**
2. n/a
3. (France) Mary Pierce (second round)
4. (France) Nathalie Tauziat (first round)
5. (Bulgaria) Katerina Maleeva (semifinals)
6. (Georgia (country)) Leila Meskhi (semifinals)
7. (Belgium) Sabine Appelmans (quarterfinals)
8. (France) Julie Halard (final)

== Draw ==
=== Key ===
- Q = Qualifier
- WC = Wild card
- LL = Lucky loser
- Alt = Alternate
- SE = Special exempt
- PR = Protected ranking
- ITF = ITF entry
- JE = Junior exempt
- w/o = Walkover
- r = Retired
- d = Defaulted
- SR = Special ranking

First round
1	(United States) **M Navratilova**	**6**	**6**
(Germany) C Singer	2	2
(Italy) **L Golarsa**	**6**	**6**
(Hungary) A Temesvári	3	2
(France) **K Quentrec**	**7**	**6**
Q	(France) C Lucarelli	5	2
(Belgium) S Wasserman	6	1
7	(Belgium) **S Appelmans**	**7**	**6**
3	(France) **M Pierce**	**6**	**6**
(Germany) M Kochta	4	1
(France) N van Lottum	**6**	2	3
Q	(Netherlands) **C Vis**	4	**6**	**6**
WC	(France) A Olivier	4	5
(Czech Republic) **P Langrová**	**6**	**7**
Q	(Germany) K Oeljeklaus	3	2
6	(Georgia (country)) **L Meskhi**	**6**	**6**
5	(Bulgaria) **K Maleeva**	**4**
(Czech Republic) R Bobková	1	r
(Germany) **K Kschwendt**	**6**	2	**6**
(France) I Demongeot	3	**6**	4
WC	(France) S Pitkowski	3	3
(Germany) **P Begerow**	**6**	**6**
(Belgium) **L Courtois**	**6**	**6**
4	(France) N Tauziat	1	1
8	(France) **J Halard**	**6**	**6**
Q	(Bulgaria) E Pampoulova	3	2
(Italy) **S Cecchini**	**6**	**6**
(Netherlands) C Wegink	1	2
(Italy) M-F Bentivoglio	4	5
(Belgium) **D Monami**	**6**	**7**
(Germany) **W Probst**	**6**	**6**
LL	(Netherlands) S Noorlander	3	3

Second round
1	(United States) **M Navratilova**	**6**	**6**
(Italy) L Golarsa	0	2
(France) K Quentrec	2	1
7	(Belgium) **S Appelmans**	**6**	**6**
3	(France) M Pierce	**6**	4	1
Q	(Netherlands) **C Vis**	3	**6**	**6**
(Czech Republic) P Langrová	5	0
6	(Georgia (country)) **L Meskhi**	**7**	**6**
5	(Bulgaria) **K Maleeva**	**6**	**6**
(Germany) K Kschwendt	2	2
(Germany) P Begerow	3	**6**	6
(Belgium) **L Courtois**	**6**	4	**7**
8	(France) **J Halard**	**6**	**6**
(Italy) S Cecchini	4	4
(Belgium) D Monami	3	0
(Germany) **W Probst**	**6**	**6**

Quarterfinals
1	(United States) **M Navratilova**	**6**	3	**6**
7	(Belgium) S Appelmans	4	**6**	3
Q	(Netherlands) C Vis	0	1
6	(Georgia (country)) **L Meskhi**	**6**	**6**
5	(Bulgaria) **K Maleeva**	5	**6**	**6**
(Belgium) L Courtois	**7**	3	2
8	(France) **J Halard**	2	**7**	**6**
(Germany) W Probst	**6**	5	4

Semifinals
1	(United States) **M Navratilova**	**6**	**6**
6	(Georgia (country)) L Meskhi	1	3
5	(Bulgaria) K Maleeva	**7**	4	3
8	(France) **J Halard**	6	**6**	**6**

Final
1	(United States) **Martina Navratilova**	**7**	**6**
8	(France) Julie Halard	5	3
