= 1997 Open Gaz de France =

- Date: 10–16 February
- Edition: 5th
- Category: Tier II
- Draw: 28S / 16D
- Prize money: $450,000
- Surface: Carpet / indoor
- Location: Paris, France
- Venue: Stade Pierre de Coubertin

Champions

Singles
- (Switzerland) Martina Hingis

Doubles
- (Switzerland) Martina Hingis / (Czech Republic) Jana Novotná
← 1996 ·	Open Gaz de France	· 1998 →

The 1997 Open Gaz de France was a women's tennis tournament played on indoor carpet courts at the Stade Pierre de Coubertin in Paris, France, that was part of Tier II of the 1997 WTA Tour. It was the fifth edition of the tournament and was held from 10 February until 16 February 1997. First-seeded Martina Hingis won the singles title.

== Finals ==
=== Singles ===
(Switzerland) Martina Hingis defeated (Germany) Anke Huber 6–3, 3–6, 6–3

- It was Hingis' 4th singles title of the year and the 6th of her career.

=== Doubles ===
(Switzerland) Martina Hingis / (Czech Republic) Jana Novotná defeated (France) Alexandra Fusai / (Italy) Rita Grande 6–3, 6–0

- It was Hingis' 6th title of the year and the 11th of her career. It was Novotná's 1st title of the year and the 77th of her career.
