= 1995 Open Gaz de France =

- Date: 14–18 February
- Edition: 3rd
- Category: Tier II
- Prize money: $430,000
- Surface: Carpet / indoor
- Location: Paris, France
- Venue: Stade Pierre de Coubertin

Champions

Singles
- (Germany) Steffi Graf

Doubles
- (United States) Meredith McGrath (Latvia) Larisa Savchenko
← 1994 ·	Open Gaz de France	· 1996 →

The 1995 Open Gaz de France was a women's tennis tournament played on indoor carpet courts at the Stade Pierre de Coubertin in Paris, France, that was part of Tier II of the 1995 WTA Tour. It was the third edition of the tournament and was held from 14 February until 18 February 1995. First-seeded Steffi Graf won the singles title and earned $79,000 first-prize money.

== Finals ==
=== Singles ===
(Germany) Steffi Graf defeated (France) Mary Pierce 6–2, 6–2

- It was Graf's 1st singles title of the year and the 87th of her career.

=== Doubles ===
(United States) Meredith McGrath / (Latvia) Larisa Savchenko defeated (Netherlands) Manon Bollegraf / (Australia) Rennae Stubbs 6–4, 6–1

- It was McGrath's 1st title of the year and the 19th of her career. It was Savchenko's 1st title of the year and the 52nd of her career.
