= 1995 Open Gaz de France – Singles =

Singles
- 1995 Open Gaz de France

Final
- Champion: (Germany) Steffi Graf
- Runner-up: (France) Mary Pierce
- Score: 6–2, 6–2

Details
- Draw: 28
- Seeds: 8

Events
| Singles | Doubles |
| ← 1994 · | Open Gaz de France | · 1996 → |

Martina Navratilova was the defending champion but did not compete that year due to her retirement at the end of the 1994 season.

Steffi Graf won in the final 6–2, 6–2 against Mary Pierce.

== Seeds ==
A champion seed is indicated in bold text while text in italics indicates the round in which that seed was eliminated. The top four seeds received a bye to the second round.

1. (Germany) **Steffi Graf (champion)**
2. (France) Mary Pierce (final)
3. (Czech Republic) Jana Novotná (semifinals)
4. (Croatia) Iva Majoli (semifinals)
5. (France) Julie Halard (second round)
6. (Austria) Judith Wiesner (quarterfinals)
7. (Slovakia) Karina Habšudová (quarterfinals)
8. (Belgium) Sabine Appelmans (quarterfinals)

== Draw ==
=== Key ===
- Q = Qualifier
- WC = Wild card
- LL = Lucky loser
- Alt = Alternate
- SE = Special exempt
- PR = Protected ranking
- ITF = ITF entry
- JE = Junior exempt
- w/o = Walkover
- r = Retired
- d = Defaulted
- SR = Special ranking

=== Final ===
| Final |
| 1 | (Germany) **Steffi Graf** | **6** | **6** |
| 2 | (France) Mary Pierce | 2 | 2 |

=== Section 1 ===
First round
(Russia) **E Makarova** | **6** | **6**
(Latvia) L Neiland | 1 | 2
(Bulgaria) K Maleeva | 4 | 4
WC | (Switzerland) **M Hingis** | **6** | **6**
Q | (France) S Pitkowski | **7** | 2 | 3
5 | (France) **J Halard** | 5 | **6** | **6**
(France) **A Dechaume-Balleret** | **2**
(Georgia (country)) L Meskhi | 2 | r
LL | (Czech Republic) **P Langrová** | **6** | **6**
Q | (Finland) N Dahlman | 2 | 4
Q | (Netherlands) S Rottier | 1 | 1
7 | (Slovakia) **K Habšudová** | **6** | **6**

Second round
1 | (Germany) **S Graf** | **6** | **6**
(Russia) E Makarova | 2 | 1
WC | (Switzerland) **M Hingis** | **6** | **6**
5 | (France) J Halard | 4 | 1
3 | (Czech Republic) **J Novotná** | **7** | **6**
(France) A Dechaume-Balleret | 5 | 3
LL | (Czech Republic) P Langrová | 3 | 2
7 | (Slovakia) **K Habšudová** | **6** | **6**

Quarterfinals
1 | (Germany) **S Graf** | **6** | **6**
WC | (Switzerland) M Hingis | 2 | 3
3 | (Czech Republic) **J Novotná** | **6** | 3 | **6**
7 | (Slovakia) K Habšudová | 3 | **6** | 4

Semifinals
1 | (Germany) **S Graf** | **6** | **6**
3 | (Czech Republic) J Novotná | 2 | 3

=== Section 2 ===
First round
8 | (Belgium) **S Appelmans** | **6** | **6**
(Sweden) Å Carlsson | 4 | 2
(France) **N Tauziat** | **6** | **6**
(United States) M McGrath | 4 | 4
(Germany) **B Rittner** | **6** | **6**
WC | (France) N van Lottum | 3 | 0
6 | (Austria) **J Wiesner** | **6** | 5 | **6**
(Germany) M Babel | 2 | **7** | 4
(Netherlands) **M Oremans** | **6** | **6**
(Germany) W Probst | 4 | 2
(Italy) S Cecchini | 3 | **6** | 3
Q | (Australia) **R Stubbs** | **6** | 2 | **6**

Second round
8 | (Belgium) **S Appelmans** | **6** | **6**
(France) N Tauziat | 2 | 2
(Germany) B Rittner | 3 | 1
4 | (Croatia) **I Majoli** | **6** | **6**
6 | (Austria) **J Wiesner** | **6** | **7**
(Netherlands) M Oremans | 4 | 5
Q | (Australia) R Stubbs | 4 | **6** | 5
2 | (France) **M Pierce** | **6** | 3 | **7**

Quarterfinals
8 | (Belgium) S Appelmans | 2 | 4
4 | (Croatia) **I Majoli** | **6** | **6**
6 | (Austria) J Wiesner | 2 | 4
2 | (France) **M Pierce** | **6** | **6**

Semifinals
4 | (Croatia) I Majoli | 3 | 4
2 | (France) **M Pierce** | **6** | **6**
