= 2009 Open GDF Suez =

- Date: 9–15 February
- Edition: 17th
- Category: Premier
- Draw: 32S / 16D
- Prize money: $700,000
- Surface: Hard / indoor
- Location: Paris, France
- Venue: Stade Pierre de Coubertin

Champions

Singles
- (France) Amélie Mauresmo

Doubles
- (Zimbabwe) Cara Black / (United States) Liezel Huber
← 2008 ·	Open GDF Suez	· 2010 →

The 2009 Open GDF Suez was a women's professional tennis tournament played on indoor hardcourts. It was the 17th edition of the Open GDF Suez (formerly known as the Open Gaz de France) and was a Premier tournament on the 2009 WTA Tour. It took place at Stade Pierre de Coubertin in Paris, France, from 9 February until 15 February 2009.

The top three seeds were Serena Williams, the 2009 Australian Open singles champion and twice the winner of this event, Jelena Janković, a former world No. 1, and Elena Dementieva, the 2008 Olympic gold medalist in singles and a 2009 Australian Open semifinalist. Agnieszka Radwańska, home favourite Alizé Cornet, Patty Schnyder, Anabel Medina Garrigues, and two-time champion Amélie Mauresmo also played this event.

Eighth-seeded Amélie Mauresmo won the singles title. It was her third title at the event, also winning in 2001 and 2006.

== Finals ==
=== Singles ===
(France) Amélie Mauresmo defeated (Russia) Elena Dementieva 7–6^{(9–7)}, 2–6, 6–4

- It was Mauresmo's only singles title of the year and 25th and last of her career.

=== Doubles ===
(Zimbabwe) Cara Black / (United States) Liezel Huber defeated (Czech Republic) Květa Peschke / (United States) Lisa Raymond 6–4, 3–6, [10–4]

== Entrants ==
=== Seeds ===
Maria Sharapova was initially set to make her season debut here after sitting out several months with a shoulder injury. However, she eventually withdrew. She was replaced by Jelena Janković. Katarina Srebotnik also withdrew from the event with an ongoing injury.

Athlete	Nationality	Ranking*	Seeding
Serena Williams	United States	1	1
Jelena Janković	Serbia	3	2
Elena Dementieva	Russia	4	3
Agnieszka Radwańska	Poland	10	4
Alizé Cornet	France	13	5
Patty Schnyder	Switzerland	16	6
Anabel Medina Garrigues	Spain	20	7
Amélie Mauresmo	France	24	8

- Rankings as of February 9, 2009.

=== Other entrants ===
The following players received wildcards into the main draw:

- (Serbia) Jelena Janković
- (Slovakia) Daniela Hantuchová
- (France) Virginie Razzano
- (France) Nathalie Dechy

The following players received entry from the qualifying draw:

- (France) Émilie Loit
- (Croatia) Karolina Šprem
- (Ukraine) Oxana Lyubtsova
- (Latvia) Anastasija Sevastova

== Prize money & points ==
The total prize money for the tournament was US$700,000, upgraded from the previous year's US$600,000.

Total prize money: US$700,000

Round	Singles		Doubles	
Round	Prize money (US$)	WTA ranking points	Prize money (US$)	WTA ranking points
Winner	107,000	470	34,000	470
Finalist	56,000	320	17,800	320
Semifinal	30,000	200	9,400	200
Quarterfinal	15,925	120	4,950	120
Round of 16	8,950	60	2,650	1
Round of 32	4,580	1	-	-
Qualified	-	20	-	-
Qualifying 3rd round	2,460	12	-	-
Qualifying 2nd round	1,320	8	-	-
Qualifying 1sf round	700	1	-	-
