= 1998 Open Gaz de France – Singles =

Singles
- 1998 Open Gaz de France

Final
- Champion: (France) Mary Pierce
- Runner-up: (Belgium) Dominique Van Roost
- Score: 6–3, 7–5

Details
- Draw: 28
- Seeds: 8

Events
Singles	Doubles
← 1997 ·	Open Gaz de France	· 1999 →

Martina Hingis was the defending champion but did not compete that year.

Mary Pierce won in the final 6–3, 7–5 against Dominique Van Roost.

== Seeds ==
A champion seed is indicated in bold text while text in italics indicates the round in which that seed was eliminated. The top four seeds received a bye to the second round.

1. (Czech Republic) Jana Novotná (semifinals)
2. (Croatia) Iva Majoli (quarterfinals)
3. (France) **Mary Pierce (champion)**
4. (France) Nathalie Tauziat (semifinals)
5. (Germany) Anke Huber (quarterfinals)
6. (Belgium) Dominique Van Roost (final)
7. (Austria) Barbara Paulus (quarterfinals)
8. (Belgium) Sabine Appelmans (second round)

== Draw ==
=== Key ===
- Q = Qualifier
- WC = Wild card
- LL = Lucky loser
- Alt = Alternate
- SE = Special exempt
- PR = Protected ranking
- ITF = ITF entry
- JE = Junior exempt
- w/o = Walkover
- r = Retired
- d = Defaulted
- SR = Special ranking

=== Final ===
Final
3	(France) **Mary Pierce**	**6**	**7**
6	(Belgium) Dominique Van Roost	3	5

=== Section 1 ===
First round
(Italy) **R Grande**	**7**	**6**
(Netherlands) M Oremans	6	1
(Italy) **S Farina**	2	**6**	**6**
(Czech Republic) D Chládková	**6**	2	3
(Czech Republic) S Kleinová	3	5
7	(Austria) **B Paulus**	**6**	**7**
(Slovakia) **K Habšudová**	**7**	4	**6**
(France) J Halard-Decugis	6	**6**	4
WC	(France) A Dechaume-Balleret	3	5
(Russia) **A Kournikova**	**6**	**7**
WC	(France) A Fusai	1	1
5	(Germany) **A Huber**	**6**	**6**

Second round
1	(Czech Republic) **J Novotná**	**6**	**6**
(Italy) R Grande	1	4
(Italy) S Farina	1	3
7	(Austria) **B Paulus**	**6**	**6**
3	(France) **M Pierce**	**6**	1	**6**
(Slovakia) K Habšudová	1	**6**	1
(Russia) A Kournikova	2	**6**	4
5	(Germany) **A Huber**	**6**	1	**6**

Quarterfinals
1	(Czech Republic) **J Novotná**	**6**	1	**6**
7	(Austria) B Paulus	2	**6**	4
3	(France) **M Pierce**	1	**6**	**6**
5	(Germany) A Huber	**6**	1	2

Semifinals
1	(Czech Republic) J Novotná	4	**6**	3
3	(France) **M Pierce**	**6**	2	**6**

=== Section 2 ===
First round
8	(Belgium) **S Appelmans**	**6**	**6**
Q	(Latvia) L Savchenko	1	3
LL	(France) **S Pitkowski**	**6**	**6**
(France) A-G Sidot	4	0
(Bulgaria) M Maleeva	0	2
Q	(France) **É Loit**	**6**	**6**
6	(Belgium) **D Van Roost**	**6**	4	**6**
(Austria) B Schett	2	**6**	0
Q	(Belgium) L Courtois	**6**	5	4
Q	(Germany) **W Probst**	3	**7**	**6**
(Argentina) **F Labat**	**6**	**6**
(Russia) E Likhovtseva	4	1

Second round
8	(Belgium) S Appelmans	**7**	3	1
LL	(France) **S Pitkowski**	5	**6**	**6**
Q	(France) É Loit	**6**	6	4
4	(France) **N Tauziat**	4	**7**	**6**
6	(Belgium) **D Van Roost**	5	**6**	**7**
Q	(Germany) W Probst	**7**	2	6
(Argentina) F Labat	**7**	2	4
2	(Croatia) **I Majoli**	5	**6**	**6**

Quarterfinals
LL	(France) S Pitkowski	1	**6**	6
4	(France) **N Tauziat**	**6**	2	**7**
6	(Belgium) **D Van Roost**	**7**	**6**
2	(Croatia) I Majoli	5	3

Semifinals
4	(France) N Tauziat	6	**6**	1
6	(Belgium) **D Van Roost**	**7**	1	**6**
