= 2010 Open GDF Suez =

- Date: 8–14 February
- Edition: 18th
- Category: Premier
- Draw: 30S / 16D
- Prize money: $700,000
- Surface: Hard / indoor
- Location: Paris, France
- Venue: Stade Pierre de Coubertin

Champions

Singles
- (Russia) Elena Dementieva

Doubles
- (Czech Republic) Iveta Benešová / (Czech Republic) Barbora Záhlavová-Strýcová
← 2009 ·	Open GDF Suez	· 2011 →

The 2010 Open GDF Suez was a women's professional tennis tournament played on indoor hard courts. It was the 18th edition of the Open GDF Suez (formerly known as the Open Gaz de France) and was a Premier tournament on the 2010 WTA Tour. It took place at Stade Pierre de Coubertin in Paris, France from February 8 through February 14, 2010.

The top two seeds were Elena Dementieva, the 2008 Olympic gold medalist in singles and a 2009 Wimbledon semifinalist and Flavia Pennetta. Also participating in the tournament were Yanina Wickmayer, home favourite Aravane Rezaï, Shahar Pe'er, and Alizé Cornet. Serena Williams, the 2010 Australian Open singles champion withdrew before the main draw was released.

== Finals ==
=== Singles ===
(Russia) Elena Dementieva defeated (Czech Republic) Lucie Šafářová, 6–7^{(5–7)}, 6–1, 6–4

- It was Dementieva's second title of the year and sixteenth of her career. It was also Dementieva's last career title after her retirement at the end of the year.

=== Doubles ===
(Czech Republic) Iveta Benešová / (Czech Republic) Barbora Záhlavová-Strýcová defeated (Zimbabwe) Cara Black / (United States) Liezel Huber, walkover

== Entrants ==
=== Seeds ===
Country	Player	Ranking^{1}	Seeding
RUS	Elena Dementieva	7	1
ITA	Flavia Pennetta	12	2
BEL	Yanina Wickmayer	15	3
ITA	Francesca Schiavone	18	4
FRA	Aravane Rezaï	21	5
ISR	Shahar Pe'er	22	6
FRA	Virginie Razzano	24	7
RUS	Elena Vesnina	29	8

- ^{1} Rankings as of February 1, 2010.

=== Other entrants ===
The following players received wildcards into the main draw:

- (France) Julie Coin
- (Croatia) Petra Martić
- (Italy) Flavia Pennetta

The following players received entry from the qualifying draw:

- (Russia) Vesna Manasieva
- (Romania) Ioana Raluca Olaru
- (Russia) Evgeniya Rodina
- (Croatia) Karolina Šprem
