= 1996 Open Gaz de France – Doubles =

Doubles
- 1996 Open Gaz de France
- 1995 Champions: (United States) Meredith McGrath (Latvia) Larisa Savchenko

Final
- Champions: (Netherlands) Kristie Boogert (Czech Republic) Jana Novotná
- Runners-up: (France) Julie Halard-Decugis (France) Nathalie Tauziat
- Score: 6–4, 6–3

Details
- Draw: 16
- Seeds: 4

Events
Singles	Doubles
← 1995 ·	Open Gaz de France	· 1997 →

Meredith McGrath and Larisa Savchenko were the defending champions but lost in the quarterfinals to Laurence Courtois and Nancy Feber.

Kristie Boogert and Jana Novotná won in the final 6–4, 6–3 against Julie Halard-Decugis and Nathalie Tauziat.

== Seeds ==
Champion seeds are indicated in bold text while text in italics indicates the round in which those seeds were eliminated.

1. (United States) Meredith McGrath / (Latvia) Larisa Savchenko (quarterfinals)
2. (United States) Lori McNeil / (Czech Republic) Helena Suková (semifinals)
3. (Netherlands) **Kristie Boogert** / (Czech Republic) **Jana Novotná (champions)**
4. (France) Julie Halard-Decugis / (France) Nathalie Tauziat (final)

== Draw ==
=== Key ===
- Q = Qualifier
- WC = Wild card
- LL = Lucky loser
- Alt = Alternate
- ITF = ITF entry
- PR = Protected ranking
- SR = Special ranking
- SE = Special exempt
- JE = Junior exempt
- JR = Junior Accelerator Programme entrant
- CO = College Accelerator Programme entrant
- NG = Next Gen Accelerator Program entrant
- w/o = Walkover
- r = Retired
- d = Defaulted

First round
1	(United States) **M McGrath** (Latvia) **L Savchenko**	**6**	**6**
(Ukraine) O Lugina (Ukraine) N Medvedeva	0	3
(Belgium) S Appelmans (Netherlands) M Oremans	4	5
(Belgium) **L Courtois** (Belgium) **N Feber**	**6**	**7**
4	(France) **J Halard-Decugis** (France) **N Tauziat**	**6**	**6**
(Germany) J Kandarr (France) A-G Sidot	2	0
(South Africa) M de Swardt (Netherlands) C Vis	3	r
(Czech Republic) **P Langrová** (Slovakia) **R Zrubáková**	**5**
(France) **A Dechaume-Balleret** (France) **S Testud**	**6**	**6**
(Slovakia) D Krajčovičová (Italy) F Perfetti	3	1
(Italy) S Farina (France) A Fusai	3	6
3	(Netherlands) **K Boogert** (Czech Republic) **J Novotná**	**6**	**7**
(Finland) N Dahlman (Belgium) D Van Roost	1	4
(Russia) **E Makarova** (Russia) **E Maniokova**	**6**	**6**
(Switzerland) M Hingis (Croatia) I Majoli	**7**	4	4
2	(United States) **L McNeil** (Czech Republic) **H Suková**	6	**6**	**6**

Quarterfinals
1	(United States) M McGrath (Latvia) L Savchenko	**6**	4	3
(Belgium) **L Courtois** (Belgium) **N Feber**	1	**6**	**6**
4	(France) **J Halard-Decugis** (France) **N Tauziat**	**6**	**6**
(Czech Republic) P Langrová (Slovakia) R Zrubáková	3	2
(France) A Dechaume-Balleret (France) S Testud
3	(Netherlands) **K Boogert** (Czech Republic) **J Novotná**	**w/o**
(Russia) E Makarova (Russia) E Maniokova	4	4
2	(United States) **L McNeil** (Czech Republic) **H Suková**	**6**	**6**

Semifinals
(Belgium) L Courtois (Belgium) N Feber	3	2
4	(France) **J Halard-Decugis** (France) **N Tauziat**	**6**	**6**
3	(Netherlands) **K Boogert** (Czech Republic) **J Novotná**	**6**	**6**
2	(United States) L McNeil (Czech Republic) H Suková	1	1

Final
4	(France) Julie Halard-Decugis (France) Nathalie Tauziat	4	3
3	(Netherlands) **Kristie Boogert** (Czech Republic) **Jana Novotná**	**6**	**6**
