= 2011 Open GDF Suez =

- Date: 7–13 February
- Edition: 19th
- Category: Premier
- Draw: 30S / 16D
- Prize money: $618,000
- Surface: Hard / indoor
- Location: Paris, France
- Venue: Stade Pierre de Coubertin

Champions

Singles
- (Czech Republic) Petra Kvitová

Doubles
- (United States) Bethanie Mattek-Sands / (United States) Meghann Shaughnessy
← 2010 ·	Open GDF Suez	· 2012 →

The 2011 Open GDF Suez was a women's professional tennis tournament played on indoor hard courts. It was the 19th edition of the Open GDF Suez (formerly known as the Open Gaz de France) and was a Premier tournament on the 2011 WTA Tour. It took place at Stade Pierre de Coubertin in Paris, France from 7 February through 13 February 2011. Fourth-seeded Petra Kvitová won the singles title.

== Entrants ==
=== Seeds ===
Country	Player	Ranking^{1}	Seeding
BEL	Kim Clijsters	2	1
RUS	Maria Sharapova	13	2
EST	Kaia Kanepi	17	3
CZE	Petra Kvitová	18	4
RUS	Nadia Petrova	20	5
GER	Andrea Petkovic	24	6
BEL	Yanina Wickmayer	26	7
SVK	Dominika Cibulková	27	8

- ^{1} Rankings as of January 31, 2011.

=== Other entrants ===
The following players received wildcards into the main draw:

- (France) Virginie Razzano
- (Russia) Maria Sharapova
- (Belgium) Yanina Wickmayer

The following players received entry from the qualifying draw:

- (Australia) Jelena Dokić
- (Slovakia) Kristína Kučová
- (Russia) Vesna Manasieva
- (Croatia) Ana Vrljić

The following players received entry as a lucky loser into the singles main draw:

- (France) Stéphanie Cohen-Aloro

== Finals ==
=== Singles ===
(Czech Republic) Petra Kvitová defeated (Belgium) Kim Clijsters, 6–4, 6–3.

- It was Kvitová's second title of the year and third career title.

=== Doubles ===
(United States) Bethanie Mattek-Sands / (United States) Meghann Shaughnessy defeated (Russia) Vera Dushevina / (Russia) Ekaterina Makarova, 6–4, 6–2.
