= 1995 Open Gaz de France – Doubles =

Doubles
- 1995 Open Gaz de France
- 1994 Champions: (Belgium) Sabine Appelmans (Belgium) Laurence Courtois

Final
- Champions: (United States) Meredith McGrath (Latvia) Larisa Neiland
- Runners-up: (Netherlands) Manon Bollegraf (Australia) Rennae Stubbs
- Score: 6–4, 6–1

Events
Singles	Doubles
← 1994 ·	Open Gaz de France	· 1996 →

Sabine Appelmans and Laurence Courtois were the defending champions but only Appelmans competed that year with Miriam Oremans.

Appelmans and Oremans lost in the first round to Julie Halard and Nathalie Tauziat.

Meredith McGrath and Larisa Neiland won in the final 6–4, 6–1 against Manon Bollegraf and Rennae Stubbs.

== Seeds ==
Champion seeds are indicated in bold text while text in italics indicates the round in which those seeds were eliminated.

1. (United States) **Meredith McGrath** / (Latvia) **Larisa Neiland (champions)**
2. (Netherlands) Manon Bollegraf / (Australia) Rennae Stubbs (final)
3. (France) Julie Halard / (France) Nathalie Tauziat (semifinals)
4. (Czech Republic) Jana Novotná / (France) Mary Pierce (semifinals)

== Draw ==
=== Key ===
- Q = Qualifier
- WC = Wild card
- LL = Lucky loser
- Alt = Alternate
- SE = Special exempt
- PR = Protected ranking
- ITF = ITF entry
- JE = Junior exempt
- w/o = Walkover
- r = Retired
- d = Defaulted
- SR = Special ranking

First round
1	(United States) **M McGrath** (Latvia) **L Neiland**	**7**	**6**
WC	(Netherlands) S Noorlander (Germany) M Weingärtner	5	3
(Slovakia) **K Habšudová** (Netherlands) **N Muns-Jagerman**	**6**	**6**
(Finland) N Dahlman (France) A Fusai	4	3
3	(France) **J Halard** (France) **N Tauziat**	**7**	**6**
(Belgium) S Appelmans (Netherlands) M Oremans	5	3
(Czech Republic) P Langrová (Russia) E Makarova	**6**	4	0
WC	(France) **C Dhenin** (Finland) **P Thorén**	1	**6**	**6**
Q	(Germany) B Rittner (Germany) C Schneider	5	**6**	6
(France) **S Testud** (France) **N van Lottum**	**7**	1	**7**
(Ukraine) O Lugina (Netherlands) C Vis	2	6
4	(Czech Republic) **J Novotná** (France) **M Pierce**	**6**	**7**
(France) **A Dechaume-Balleret** (Germany) **W Probst**	**7**	1	**6**
(Sweden) Å Carlsson (Bulgaria) K Maleeva	5	**6**	1
(Italy) S Cecchini (France) I Demongeot	3	6
2	(Netherlands) **M Bollegraf** (Australia) **R Stubbs**	**6**	**7**

Quarterfinals
1	(United States) **M McGrath** (Latvia) **L Neiland**	**6**	**6**
(Slovakia) K Habšudová (Netherlands) N Muns-Jagerman	2	1
3	(France) **J Halard** (France) **N Tauziat**	**7**	**7**
WC	(France) C Dhenin (Finland) P Thorén	5	5
(France) S Testud (France) N van Lottum	3	0
4	(Czech Republic) **J Novotná** (France) **M Pierce**	**6**	**6**
(France) A Dechaume-Balleret (Germany) W Probst	2	2
2	(Netherlands) **M Bollegraf** (Australia) **R Stubbs**	**6**	**6**

Semifinals
1	(United States) **M McGrath** (Latvia) **L Neiland**	**6**	**7**
3	(France) J Halard (France) N Tauziat	2	5
4	(Czech Republic) J Novotná (France) M Pierce	1	5
2	(Netherlands) **M Bollegraf** (Australia) **R Stubbs**	**6**	**7**

Final
1	(United States) **Meredith McGrath** (Latvia) **Larisa Neiland**	**6**	**6**
2	(Netherlands) Manon Bollegraf (Australia) Rennae Stubbs	4	1
