= 2009 Open GDF Suez – Doubles =

Doubles
- 2009 Open GDF Suez

Final
- Champions: (Zimbabwe) Cara Black (United States) Liezel Huber
- Runners-up: (Czech Republic) Květa Peschke (United States) Lisa Raymond
- Score: 6–4, 3–6, 10–4

Details
- Draw: 16
- Seeds: 4

Events
Singles	Doubles
← 2008 ·	Open GDF Suez	· 2010 →

Alona Bondarenko and Kateryna Bondarenko were the defending champions but they chose not to compete this year.

== Seeds ==
1. (Zimbabwe) Cara Black / (United States) Liezel Huber (champions)
2. (Czech Republic) Květa Peschke / (United States) Lisa Raymond (final)
3. (Romania) Sorana Cîrstea / (Romania) Monica Niculescu (semifinals)
4. (United States) Raquel Kops-Jones / (Czech Republic) Vladimíra Uhlířová (first round)

== Draw ==
Key

- Q = Qualifier
- WC = Wild card
- LL = Lucky loser
- Alt = Alternate
- ITF = ITF entry
- PR = Protected ranking
- SR = Special ranking
- SE = Special exempt
- JE = Junior exempt
- JR = Junior Accelerator Programme entrant
- CO = College Accelerator Programme entrant
- NG = Next Gen Accelerator Program entrant
- w/o = Walkover
- r = Retired
- d = Defaulted

=== Draw ===
First round
1	(Zimbabwe) C Black (United States) L Huber	7	6
(Czech Republic) I Benešová (Poland) A Rosolska	6^{5}	4
(Russia) A Kleybanova (Russia) E Makarova	6	6
(France) S Cohen-Aloro (Tunisia) S Sfar	4	3
4	(United States) R Kops-Jones (Czech Republic) V Uhlířová	6	1	[7]
(Russia) M Kondratieva (France) S Lefèvre	3	6	[10]
(Germany) J Görges (Switzerland) P Schnyder	5	7	[10]
(Italy) S Errani (Italy) F Schiavone	7	5	[2]
(Slovakia) Z Kučová (Slovakia) L Tvarošková	6	7
(Canada) M-È Pelletier (France) A Védy	2	6^{6}
(France) S Brémond (France) V Razzano	6^{2}	6^{5}
3	(Romania) S Cîrstea (Romania) M Niculescu	7	7
(Czech Republic) E Hrdinová (Turkey) İ Şenoğlu	6	1	[10]
(Bosnia and Herzegovina) M Jugić-Salkić (Belarus) T Poutchek	0	6	[5]
(Georgia (country)) M Chakhnashvili (Germany) J Schruff	5	3
2	(Czech Republic) K Peschke (United States) L Raymond	7	6

Quarterfinals
1	(Zimbabwe) C Black (United States) L Huber	6	6
(Russia) A Kleybanova (Russia) E Makarova	4	1
(Russia) M Kondratieva (France) S Lefèvre	1	6	[5]
(Germany) J Görges (Switzerland) P Schnyder	6	3	[10]
(Slovakia) Z Kučová (Slovakia) L Tvarošková	7	3	[8]
3	(Romania) S Cîrstea (Romania) M Niculescu	5	6	[10]
(Czech Republic) E Hrdinová (Turkey) İ Şenoğlu	6	3	[8]
2	(Czech Republic) K Peschke (United States) L Raymond	4	6	[10]

Semifinals
1	(Zimbabwe) C Black (United States) L Huber	6	6
(Germany) J Görges (Switzerland) P Schnyder	1	4
3	(Romania) S Cîrstea (Romania) M Niculescu
2	(Czech Republic) K Peschke (United States) L Raymond	w/o

Final
1	(Zimbabwe) C Black (United States) L Huber	6	3	[10]
2	(Czech Republic) K Peschke (United States) L Raymond	4	6	[4]
