= 1997 Open Gaz de France – Singles =

Singles
- 1997 Open Gaz de France
- 1996 Champion: (France) Julie Halard-Decugis

Final
- Champion: (Switzerland) Martina Hingis
- Runner-up: (Germany) Anke Huber
- Score: 6–3, 3–6, 6–3

Details
- Draw: 28
- Seeds: 8

Events
Singles	Doubles
← 1996 ·	Open Gaz de France	· 1998 →

Julie Halard-Decugis was the defending champion but did not compete that year.

Martina Hingis won in the final 6–3, 3–6, 6–3 against Anke Huber.

== Seeds ==
A champion seed is indicated in bold text while text in italics indicates the round in which that seed was eliminated. The top four seeds received a bye to the second round.

1. (Switzerland) **Martina Hingis (champion)**
2. (Czech Republic) Jana Novotná (semifinals)
3. (Germany) Anke Huber (final)
4. (Croatia) Iva Majoli (semifinals)
5. (Romania) Irina Spîrlea (quarterfinals)
6. (Slovakia) Karina Habšudová (second round)
7. (Netherlands) Brenda Schultz-McCarthy (second round)
8. (France) Mary Pierce (quarterfinals)

== Draw ==
=== Key ===
- Q = Qualifier
- WC = Wild card
- LL = Lucky loser
- Alt = Alternate
- ITF = ITF entry
- PR = Protected ranking
- SR = Special ranking
- SE = Special exempt
- JE = Junior exempt
- JR = Junior Accelerator Programme entrant
- CO = College Accelerator Programme entrant
- NG = Next Gen Accelerator Program entrant
- w/o = Walkover
- r = Retired
- d = Defaulted

=== Final ===
Final
1	(Switzerland) **Martina Hingis**	**6**	3	**6**
3	(Germany) Anke Huber	3	**6**	3

=== Section 1 ===
First round
(Slovakia) K Studeníková	**6**	1	3
(Italy) **S Farina**	3	**6**	**6**
(Argentina) F Labat	1	2
(France) **N Tauziat**	**6**	**6**
WC	(France) N Dechy	**6**	4	3
6	(Slovakia) **K Habšudová**	2	**6**	**6**
Q	(Sweden) M Strandlund	2	**7**	1
WC	(France) **A-G Sidot**	**6**	6	**6**
(Austria) B Schett	4	5
(Indonesia) **Y Basuki**	**6**	**7**
(Slovakia) H Nagyová	**6**	1	2
7	(Netherlands) **B Schultz-McCarthy**	4	**6**	**6**

Second round
1	(Switzerland) **M Hingis**	**6**	**6**
(Italy) S Farina	3	4
(France) **N Tauziat**	**6**	**7**
6	(Slovakia) K Habšudová	4	6
4	(Croatia) **I Majoli**	**6**	**6**
WC	(France) A-G Sidot	4	3
(Indonesia) **Y Basuki**	**6**	3	**6**
7	(Netherlands) B Schultz-McCarthy	4	**6**	2

Quarterfinals
1	(Switzerland) **M Hingis**	**6**	**6**
(France) N Tauziat	3	2
4	(Croatia) **I Majoli**	**7**	3	**6**
(Indonesia) Y Basuki	6	**6**	3

Semifinals
1	(Switzerland) **M Hingis**	**6**	**6**
4	(Croatia) I Majoli	1	3

=== Section 2 ===
First round
5	(Romania) **I Spîrlea**	**6**	**7**
(Russia) E Likhovtseva	4	5
(United States) **C Rubin**	**6**	**6**
Q	(United States) N Arendt	1	1
(Bulgaria) M Maleeva	5	2
(Belgium) **S Appelmans**	**7**	**6**
8	(France) **M Pierce**	**6**	**6**
(Sweden) Å Carlsson	2	3
Q	(Germany) A Glass	5	0
Q	(Czech Republic) **A Gerši**	**7**	**6**
LL	(Netherlands) **K Boogert**	0	**6**	**7**
(France) S Testud	**6**	1	6

Second round
5	(Romania) **I Spîrlea**	**6**	**6**
(United States) C Rubin	3	4
(Belgium) S Appelmans	3	2
3	(Germany) **A Huber**	**6**	**6**
8	(France) **M Pierce**	**w/o**
Q	(Czech Republic) A Gerši
LL	(Netherlands) K Boogert	2	4
2	(Czech Republic) **J Novotná**	**6**	**6**

Quarterfinals
5	(Romania) I Spîrlea	4	2
3	(Germany) **A Huber**	**6**	**6**
8	(France) M Pierce	1	2
2	(Czech Republic) **J Novotná**	**6**	**6**

Semifinals
3	(Germany) **A Huber**	**6**	**6**
2	(Czech Republic) J Novotná	3	4
