= 1996 Open Gaz de France – Singles =

Singles
- 1996 Open Gaz de France
- 1995 Champion: (Germany) Steffi Graf

Final
- Champion: (France) Julie Halard-Decugis
- Runner-up: (Croatia) Iva Majoli
- Score: 7–5, 7–6^{(7–4)}

Details
- Draw: 28
- Seeds: 8

Events
Singles	Doubles
← 1995 ·	Open Gaz de France	· 1997 →

Steffi Graf was the defending champion but did not compete that year.

Julie Halard-Decugis won in the final 7–5, 7–6^{(7–4)} against Iva Majoli.

== Seeds ==
A champion seed is indicated in bold text while text in italics indicates the round in which that seed was eliminated. The top four seeds received a bye to the second round.

1. (Croatia) Iva Majoli (final)
2. (Germany) Anke Huber (quarterfinals)
3. (Bulgaria) Magdalena Maleeva (semifinals)
4. (France) Mary Pierce (second round)
5. (Czech Republic) Jana Novotná (first round)
6. (Switzerland) Martina Hingis (second round)
7. (France) Nathalie Tauziat (second round)
8. (Czech Republic) Helena Suková (first round)

== Draw ==
=== Key ===
- Q = Qualifier
- WC = Wild card
- LL = Lucky loser
- Alt = Alternate
- ITF = ITF entry
- PR = Protected ranking
- SR = Special ranking
- SE = Special exempt
- JE = Junior exempt
- JR = Junior Accelerator Programme entrant
- CO = College Accelerator Programme entrant
- NG = Next Gen Accelerator Program entrant
- w/o = Walkover
- r = Retired
- d = Defaulted

=== Final ===
Final
1	(Croatia) Iva Majoli	5	6
	(France) **Julie Halard-Decugis**	**7**	**7**

=== Section 1 ===
First round
(France) **S Testud**	4	**6**	**6**
Q	(Ukraine) N Medvedeva	**6**	2	2
(United States) L McNeil	3	**6**	4
Q	(France) **N Dechy**	**6**	4	**6**
(Germany) B Rittner	3	1
7	(France) **N Tauziat**	**6**	**6**
(Russia) **E Likhovtseva**	4	**6**	**6**
WC	(France) A-G Sidot	**6**	4	2
(Netherlands) **M Oremans**	**6**	6	**6**
(South Africa) M de Swardt	1	**7**	2
(Austria) **J Wiesner**	1	**7**	**6**
5	(Czech Republic) J Novotná	**6**	5	3

Second round
1	(Croatia) **I Majoli**	**w/o**
(France) S Testud
Q	(France) **N Dechy**	**7**	1	**7**
7	(France) N Tauziat	5	**6**	5
3	(Bulgaria) **M Maleeva**	**6**	**6**
(Russia) E Likhovtseva	0	3
(Netherlands) **M Oremans**	6	**7**	**7**
(Austria) J Wiesner	**7**	6	6

Quarterfinals
1	(Croatia) **I Majoli**	4	**6**	**6**
Q	(France) N Dechy	**6**	4	1
3	(Bulgaria) **M Maleeva**	**6**	**6**
(Netherlands) M Oremans	3	4

Semifinals
1	(Croatia) **I Majoli**	1	**7**	**6**
3	(Bulgaria) M Maleeva	**6**	5	3

=== Section 2 ===
First round
6	(Switzerland) **M Hingis**	**6**	**6**
Q	(United States) M McGrath	2	2
(Netherlands) K Boogert	1	4
(Italy) **S Farina**	**6**	**6**
Q	(Belgium) L Courtois	4	5
(Germany) **P Begerow**	**6**	**7**
8	(Czech Republic) H Suková	3	4
(France) **J Halard-Decugis**	**6**	**6**
LL	(Austria) M Schnell	3	5
(Belgium) **S Appelmans**	**6**	**7**
(Russia) E Makarova	4	3
(Belgium) **D Van Roost**	**6**	**6**

Second round
6	(Switzerland) M Hingis	3	1
(Italy) **S Farina**	**6**	**6**
(Germany) **P Begerow**	**7**	**7**
4	(France) M Pierce	5	5
(France) **J Halard-Decugis**	3	**6**	**7**
(Belgium) S Appelmans	**6**	2	6
(Belgium) D Van Roost	6	6
2	(Germany) **A Huber**	**7**	**7**

Quarterfinals
(Italy) **S Farina**	**6**	**6**
(Germany) P Begerow	3	1
(France) **J Halard-Decugis**	**6**	2	**7**
2	(Germany) A Huber	3	**6**	6

Semifinals
(Italy) S Farina	4	4
(France) **J Halard-Decugis**	**6**	**6**
