= 1994 Open Gaz de France – Doubles =

Doubles
- 1994 Open Gaz de France
- 1993 Champions: (Czech Republic) Jana Novotná (Czech Republic) Andrea Strnadová

Final
- Champions: (Belgium) Sabine Appelmans (Belgium) Laurence Courtois
- Runners-up: (France) Mary Pierce (Hungary) Andrea Temesvári
- Score: 6–4, 6–4

Details
- Draw: 16
- Seeds: 4

Events
Singles	Doubles
← 1993 ·	Open Gaz de France	· 1995 →

Jana Novotná and Andrea Strnadová were the defending champions but only Novotná competed that year with Laura Golarsa.

Golarsa and Novotná lost in the quarterfinals to Sabine Appelmans and Laurence Courtois.

Appelmans and Courtois won in the final 6–4, 6–4 against Mary Pierce and Andrea Temesvári.

== Seeds ==
Champion seeds are indicated in bold text while text in italics indicates the round in which those seeds were eliminated.

1. (Italy) Laura Golarsa / (Czech Republic) Jana Novotná (quarterfinals)
2. (Bulgaria) Katerina Maleeva / (Georgia (country)) Leila Meskhi (semifinals)
3. (Germany) Karin Kschwendt / (Netherlands) Caroline Vis (quarterfinals)
4. (France) Julie Halard / (France) Nathalie Tauziat (quarterfinals)

== Draw ==
=== Key ===
- Q = Qualifier
- WC = Wild card
- LL = Lucky loser
- Alt = Alternate
- SE = Special exempt
- PR = Protected ranking
- ITF = ITF entry
- JE = Junior exempt
- w/o = Walkover
- r = Retired
- d = Defaulted
- SR = Special ranking

First round
1	(Italy) **L Golarsa** (Czech Republic) **J Novotná**	**w/o**
(Czech Republic) R Bobková (Czech Republic) P Langrová
(Italy) S Cecchini (France) I Demongeot	**6**	6	3
(Belgium) **S Appelmans** (Belgium) **L Courtois**	3	**7**	**6**
3	(Germany) **K Kschwendt** (Netherlands) **C Vis**	**6**	**6**
(Italy) E Brusati (Netherlands) S Noorlander	4	4
(Germany) **W Probst** (Germany) **C Singer**	**6**	5	**6**
(Poland) K Teodorowicz (Czech Republic) H Vildová	2	**7**	4
(France) **M Pierce** (Hungary) **A Temesvári**	**6**	**6**
(France) N van Lottum (Netherlands) C Wegink	3	4
(Ukraine) O Lugina (Bulgaria) E Pampoulova	**6**	6	2
4	(France) **J Halard** (France) **N Tauziat**	4	**7**	**6**
(Germany) M Kochta (Slovakia) D Szabova	3	1
Q	(France) **K Quentrec** (Belgium) **S Wasserman**	**6**	**6**
(Czech Republic) P Rajzlová (Czech Republic) S Štefková	3	3
2	(Bulgaria) **K Maleeva** (Georgia (country)) **L Meskhi**	**6**	**6**

Quarterfinals
1	(Italy) L Golarsa (Czech Republic) J Novotná
(Belgium) **S Appelmans** (Belgium) **L Courtois**	**w/o**
3	(Germany) K Kschwendt (Netherlands) C Vis	**7**	5	6
(Germany) **W Probst** (Germany) **C Singer**	5	**7**	**7**
(France) **M Pierce** (Hungary) **A Temesvári**	**6**	1	**7**
4	(France) J Halard (France) N Tauziat	1	**6**	5
(France) K Quentrec (Belgium) S Wasserman	3	4
2	(Bulgaria) **K Maleeva** (Georgia (country)) **L Meskhi**	**6**	**6**

Semifinals
(Belgium) **S Appelmans** (Belgium) **L Courtois**	**6**	**6**
(Germany) W Probst (Germany) C Singer	1	1
(France) **M Pierce** (Hungary) **A Temesvári**	**6**	**6**
2	(Bulgaria) K Maleeva (Georgia (country)) L Meskhi	3	2

Final
(Belgium) **Sabine Appelmans** (Belgium) **Laurence Courtois**	**6**	**6**
(France) Mary Pierce (Hungary) Andrea Temesvári	4	4
