= 2011 Open GDF Suez – Doubles =

Doubles
- 2011 Open GDF Suez

Final
- Champions: (United States) Bethanie Mattek-Sands (United States) Meghann Shaughnessy
- Runners-up: (Russia) Vera Dushevina (Russia) Ekaterina Makarova
- Score: 6–4, 6–2

Events
Singles	Doubles
← 2010 ·	Open GDF Suez	· 2012 →

Iveta Benešová and Barbora Záhlavová-Strýcová were the defending champions, but they lost in the first round against Maria Elena Camerin and Darya Kustova.
In the final, Bethanie Mattek-Sands and Meghann Shaughnessy defeated Vera Dushevina and Ekaterina Makarova 6–4, 6–2.

== Seeds ==
1. (United States) Liezel Huber / (Russia) Nadia Petrova (first round)
2. (Czech Republic) Iveta Benešová / (Czech Republic) Barbora Záhlavová-Strýcová (first round)
3. (United States) Bethanie Mattek-Sands / (United States) Meghann Shaughnessy (champions)
4. (South Africa) Natalie Grandin / (Czech Republic) Vladimíra Uhlířová (first round)

== Main draw ==
=== Key ===
- Q = Qualifier
- WC = Wild card
- LL = Lucky loser
- Alt = Alternate
- SE = Special exempt
- PR = Protected ranking
- ITF = ITF entry
- JE = Junior exempt
- w/o = Walkover
- r = Retired
- d = Defaulted
- SR = Special ranking

=== Draw ===
First round
1	(United States) L Huber (Russia) N Petrova	6	3	[7]
WC	(France) A Cornet (France) V Razzano	3	6	[10]
(Georgia (country)) M Chakhnashvili (Finland) E Laine	w/o
(Czech Republic) P Kvitová (Czech Republic) L Šafářová
4	(South Africa) N Grandin (Czech Republic) V Uhlířová	5	5
(Russia) V Dushevina (Russia) E Makarova	7	7
(Austria) S Klemenschits (France) I Pavlovic	6	6^{3}	[13]
(Switzerland) T Bacsinszky (France) A Védy	4	7	[11]
(Croatia) D Jurak (Hungary) K Marosi	4	4
(Russia) M Kondratieva (France) S Lefèvre	6	6
(Belarus) T Poutchek (Germany) J Wöhr	2	5
3	(United States) B Mattek-Sands (United States) M Shaughnessy	6	7
(United States) R Kops-Jones (United States) A Spears	3	6^{7}
(France) S Cohen-Aloro (Tunisia) S Sfar	6	7
(Italy) ME Camerin (Belarus) D Kustova	6	6
2	(Czech Republic) I Benešová (Czech Republic) B Záhlavová-Strýcová	4	3

Quarterfinals
WC	(France) A Cornet (France) V Razzano	5	6	[10]
(Georgia (country)) M Chakhnashvili (Finland) E Laine	7	1	[7]
(Russia) V Dushevina (Russia) E Makarova	2	6	[10]
(Austria) S Klemenschits (France) I Pavlovic	6	4	[5]
(Russia) M Kondratieva (France) S Lefèvre	3	0
3	(United States) B Mattek-Sands (United States) M Shaughnessy	6	6
(France) S Cohen-Aloro (Tunisia) S Sfar	6	1	[10]
(Italy) ME Camerin (Belarus) D Kustova	4	6	[7]

Semifinals
WC	(France) A Cornet (France) V Razzano	2	3
(Russia) V Dushevina (Russia) E Makarova	6	6
3	(United States) B Mattek-Sands (United States) M Shaughnessy	6	6
(France) S Cohen-Aloro (Tunisia) S Sfar	0	1

Finals
(Russia) V Dushevina (Russia) E Makarova	4	2
3	(United States) B Mattek-Sands (United States) M Shaughnessy	6	6
