= 1997 Open Gaz de France – Doubles =

Doubles
- 1997 Open Gaz de France
- 1996 Champions: (Netherlands) Kristie Boogert (Czech Republic) Jana Novotná

Final
- Champions: (Switzerland) Martina Hingis (Czech Republic) Jana Novotná
- Runners-up: (France) Alexandra Fusai (Italy) Rita Grande
- Score: 6–3, 6–0

Details
- Draw: 16
- Seeds: 4

Events
Singles	Doubles
← 1996 ·	Open Gaz de France	· 1998 →

Kristie Boogert and Jana Novotná were the defending champions but they competed with different partners that year, Boogert with Irina Spîrlea and Novotná with Martina Hingis.

Boogert and Spîrlea lost in the first round to Sabine Appelmans and Miriam Oremans.

Hingis and Novotná won in the final 6–3, 6–0 against Alexandra Fusai and Rita Grande.

== Seeds ==
Champion seeds are indicated in bold text while text in italics indicates the round in which those seeds were eliminated.

1. (Switzerland) **Martina Hingis** / (Czech Republic) **Jana Novotná (champions)**
2. (Latvia) Larisa Savchenko / (France) Nathalie Tauziat (quarterfinals)
3. (United States) Nicole Arendt / (Netherlands) Manon Bollegraf (first round)
4. (Indonesia) Yayuk Basuki / (Netherlands) Caroline Vis (quarterfinals)

== Draw ==
=== Key ===
- Q = Qualifier
- WC = Wild card
- LL = Lucky loser
- Alt = Alternate
- ITF = ITF entry
- PR = Protected ranking
- SR = Special ranking
- SE = Special exempt
- JE = Junior exempt
- JR = Junior Accelerator Programme entrant
- CO = College Accelerator Programme entrant
- NG = Next Gen Accelerator Program entrant
- w/o = Walkover
- r = Retired
- d = Defaulted

First round
1	(Switzerland) **M Hingis** (Czech Republic) **J Novotná**	**6**	**6**
(Russia) E Likhovtseva (Ukraine) O Lugina	3	3
Q	(France) A-G Sidot (Sweden) M Strandlund	2	**6**	3
(Germany) **A Huber** (Croatia) **I Majoli**	**6**	4	**6**
4	(Indonesia) **Y Basuki** (Netherlands) **C Vis**	4	**7**	**6**
(Slovenia) T Križan (France) N van Lottum	**6**	5	4
(Netherlands) K Boogert (Romania) I Spîrlea	2	5
(Belgium) **S Appelmans** (Netherlands) **M Oremans**	**6**	**7**
(Sweden) Å Carlsson (Argentina) F Labat	3	**6**	1
(Italy) **S Farina** (Austria) **B Schett**	**6**	3	**6**
(United States) **C Rubin** (Netherlands) **B Schultz-McCarthy**	2	**7**	**7**
3	(United States) N Arendt (Netherlands) M Bollegraf	**6**	6	6
(France) **A Fusai** (Italy) **R Grande**	**6**	4	**6**
(Belgium) E Callens (Australia) A Ellwood	2	**6**	3
(France) A Dechaume-Balleret (France) S Testud	2	6
2	(Latvia) **L Savchenko** (France) **N Tauziat**	**6**	**7**

Quarterfinals
1	(Switzerland) **M Hingis** (Czech Republic) **J Novotná**	**6**	**6**
(Germany) A Huber (Croatia) I Majoli	4	0
4	(Indonesia) Y Basuki (Netherlands) C Vis	1	**6**	5
(Belgium) **S Appelmans** (Netherlands) **M Oremans**	**6**	3	**7**
(Italy) **S Farina** (Austria) **B Schett**	**7**	1	**6**
(United States) C Rubin (Netherlands) B Schultz-McCarthy	5	**6**	4
(France) **A Fusai** (Italy) **R Grande**	**6**	4	**6**
2	(Latvia) L Savchenko (France) N Tauziat	3	**6**	2

Semifinals
1	(Switzerland) **M Hingis** (Czech Republic) **J Novotná**	**6**	2	**6**
(Belgium) S Appelmans (Netherlands) M Oremans	0	**6**	0
(Italy) S Farina (Austria) B Schett	1	2
(France) **A Fusai** (Italy) **R Grande**	**6**	**6**

Final
1	(Switzerland) **Martina Hingis** (Czech Republic) **Jana Novotná**	**6**	**6**
(France) Alexandra Fusai (Italy) Rita Grande	3	0
