= 1998 Open Gaz de France – Doubles =

Doubles
- 1998 Open Gaz de France
- 1997 Champions: (Switzerland) Martina Hingis (Czech Republic) Jana Novotná

Final
- Champions: (Belgium) Sabine Appelmans (Netherlands) Miriam Oremans
- Runners-up: (Russia) Anna Kournikova (Latvia) Larisa Savchenko
- Score: 1–6, 6–3, 7–6^{(7–3)}

Events
Singles	Doubles
← 1997 ·	Open Gaz de France	· 1999 →

Martina Hingis and Jana Novotná were the defending champions but only Novotná competed that year, partnered with Manon Bollegraf.

Bollegraf and Novotná lost in the semifinals to Anna Kournikova and Larisa Savchenko.

Sabine Appelmans and Miriam Oremans won in the final 1–6, 6–3, 7–6^{(7–3)} against Kournikova and Savchenko.

== Seeds ==
Champion seeds are indicated in bold text while text in italics indicates the round in which those seeds were eliminated.

1. (Netherlands) Manon Bollegraf / (Czech Republic) Jana Novotná (semifinals)
2. (France) Alexandra Fusai / (France) Nathalie Tauziat (semifinals)
3. (Russia) Anna Kournikova / (Latvia) Larisa Savchenko (final)
4. (Belgium) **Sabine Appelmans** / (Netherlands) **Miriam Oremans (champions)**

== Draw ==
=== Key ===
- Q = Qualifier
- WC = Wild card
- LL = Lucky loser
- Alt = Alternate
- SE = Special exempt
- PR = Protected ranking
- ITF = ITF entry
- JE = Junior exempt
- w/o = Walkover
- r = Retired
- d = Defaulted
- SR = Special ranking

First round
1	(Netherlands) **M Bollegraf** (Czech Republic) **J Novotná**	**6**	**6**
(Russia) E Kulikovskaya (Bulgaria) P Stoyanova	0	1
WC	(France) A Cocheteux (France) N Dechy	4	1
(Italy) **R Grande** (Russia) **E Likhovtseva**	**6**	**6**
3	(Russia) **A Kournikova** (Latvia) **L Savchenko**	**6**	**6**
(Italy) S Farina (Austria) B Schett	2	1
(Argentina) F Labat (Czech Republic) E Melicharová	1	2
(Slovakia) **K Habšudová** (France) **A-G Sidot**	**6**	**6**
(France) E Curutchet (France) S Georges	3	4
(Croatia) **I Majoli** (Belgium) **D Van Roost**	**6**	**6**
Q	(France) É Loit (France) A Mauresmo	2	3
4	(Belgium) **S Appelmans** (Netherlands) **M Oremans**	**6**	**6**
(France) **C Dhenin** (Germany) **C Schneider**	**7**	**6**
(France) L Ghirardi (France) S Pitkowski	5	1
(Germany) W Probst (Germany) C Singer	3	4
2	(France) **A Fusai** (France) **N Tauziat**	**6**	**6**

Quarterfinals
1	(Netherlands) **M Bollegraf** (Czech Republic) **J Novotná**	4	**7**	**6**
(Italy) R Grande (Russia) E Likhovtseva	**6**	5	0
3	(Russia) **A Kournikova** (Latvia) **L Savchenko**	**6**	**6**
(Slovakia) K Habšudová (France) A-G Sidot	2	3
(Croatia) I Majoli (Belgium) D Van Roost
4	(Belgium) **S Appelmans** (Netherlands) **M Oremans**	**w/o**
(France) C Dhenin (Germany) C Schneider	1	5
2	(France) **A Fusai** (France) **N Tauziat**	**6**	**7**

Semifinals
1	(Netherlands) M Bollegraf (Czech Republic) J Novotná	3	2
3	(Russia) **A Kournikova** (Latvia) **L Savchenko**	**6**	**6**
4	(Belgium) **S Appelmans** (Netherlands) **M Oremans**	**6**	**6**
2	(France) A Fusai (France) N Tauziat	3	3

Final
3	(Russia) Anna Kournikova (Latvia) Larisa Savchenko	**6**	3	6^{3}
4	(Belgium) **Sabine Appelmans** (Netherlands) **Miriam Oremans**	1	**6**	**7^{7}**
