= 2010 Open GDF Suez – Singles =

Singles
- 2010 Open GDF Suez

Final
- Champion: (Russia) Elena Dementieva
- Runner-up: (Czech Republic) Lucie Šafářová
- Score: 6–7^{(5–7)}, 6–1, 6–4

Details
- Draw: 30
- Seeds: 8

Events
Singles	Doubles
← 2009 ·	Open GDF Suez	· 2011 →

Amélie Mauresmo was the defending champion, but she retired from the sport on 3 December 2009.

Elena Dementieva won the title, defeating Lucie Šafářová in the final 6–7^{(5–7)}, 6–1, 6–4. This was Dementieva's final WTA singles title, before her retirement at the end of 2010.

== Seeds ==
The top two seeds received a bye into the second round.

1. (Russia) Elena Dementieva (champion)
2. (Italy) Flavia Pennetta (semifinals)
3. (Belgium) Yanina Wickmayer (first round)
4. (Italy) Francesca Schiavone (second round)
5. (France) Aravane Rezaï (second round)
6. (Israel) Shahar Pe'er (quarterfinals)
7. (France) Virginie Razzano (first round)
8. (Russia) Elena Vesnina (second round)

== Draw ==
=== Key ===
- Q = Qualifier
- WC = Wild card
- LL = Lucky loser
- Alt = Alternate
- ITF = ITF entry
- PR = Protected ranking
- SR = Special ranking
- SE = Special exempt
- JE = Junior exempt
- JR = Junior Accelerator Programme entrant
- CO = College Accelerator Programme entrant
- NG = Next Gen Accelerator Program entrant
- w/o = Walkover
- r = Retired
- d = Defaulted

=== Finals ===
Semifinals
1	(Russia) Elena Dementieva	4	6	6
(United States) Melanie Oudin	6	3	3
(Czech Republic) Lucie Šafářová	4	6	6
2/WC	(Italy) Flavia Pennetta	6	3	4

Final
1	(Russia) Elena Dementieva	6^{5}	6	6
(Czech Republic) Lucie Šafářová	7^{7}	1	4

=== Top half ===
First round
(Czech Republic) I Benešová	1	0
(Russia) A Pavlyuchenkova	6	6
(Slovenia) K Srebotnik	5	2
(Germany) A Petkovic	7	6
Q	(Russia) E Rodina	4	4
5	(France) A Rezaï	6	6
3	(Belgium) Y Wickmayer	4	6	5
WC	(Croatia) P Martić	6	3	7
(Hungary) Á Szávay	6	1
(Belarus) O Govortsova	3	0^{r}
(United States) M Oudin	6	6
(Romania) S Cîrstea	3	0
(Switzerland) P Schnyder	6	7^{7}
7	(France) V Razzano	3	6^{3}

Second round
1	(Russia) E Dementieva	6	6
(Russia) A Pavlyuchenkova	4	4
(Germany) A Petkovic	6	3	6
5	(France) A Rezaï	3	6	3
WC	(Croatia) P Martić	2	4
(Hungary) Á Szávay	6	6
(United States) M Oudin	6	6
(Switzerland) P Schnyder	1	3

Quarterfinals
1	(Russia) E Dementieva	3	6	6
(Germany) A Petkovic	6	4	2
(Hungary) Á Szávay	6	4	2
(United States) M Oudin	2	6	6

Semifinals
1	(Russia) E Dementieva	4	6	6
(United States) M Oudin	6	3	3

=== Bottom half ===
First round
6	(Israel) S Pe'er	6	6
(France) A Cornet	4	1
Q	(Croatia) K Šprem	7	6
(Switzerland) T Bacsinszky	5	1
(Czech Republic) L Šafářová	6	6
(Austria) T Paszek	0	3
Q	(Russia) V Manasieva	0	0
4	(Italy) F Schiavone	6	6
8	(Russia) E Vesnina	6	6
(Romania) A Dulgheru	1	4
(Italy) T Garbin	3	6	6
Q	(Romania) IR Olaru	6	2	4
(Russia) A Kleybanova	7	6
WC	(France) J Coin	5	4

Second round
6	(Israel) S Pe'er	6	6
Q	(Croatia) K Šprem	4	3
(Czech Republic) L Šafářová	7	6
4	(Italy) F Schiavone	5	2
8	(Russia) E Vesnina	4	6	2
(Italy) T Garbin	6	2	6
(Russia) A Kleybanova	6^{4}	1
2/WC	(Italy) F Pennetta	7^{7}	6

Quarterfinals
6	(Israel) S Pe'er	3	0
(Czech Republic) L Šafářová	6	6
(Italy) T Garbin	1	3
2/WC	(Italy) F Pennetta	6	6

Semifinals
(Czech Republic) L Šafářová	4	6	6
2/WC	(Italy) F Pennetta	6	3	4
