= 2009 Open GDF Suez – Singles =

Singles
- 2009 Open GDF Suez

Final
- Champion: (France) Amélie Mauresmo
- Runner-up: (Russia) Elena Dementieva
- Score: 7–6^{(9–7)}, 2–6, 6–4

Details
- Draw: 32
- Seeds: 8

Events
Singles	Doubles
← 2008 ·	Open GDF Suez	· 2010 →

Anna Chakvetadze was the defending champion, but chose not to participate that year.

Amélie Mauresmo won the title, defeating Elena Dementieva in the final 7–6^{(9–7)}, 2–6, 6–4. This was Mauremso's final WTA singles title before her retirement at the end of 2009.

== Seeds ==
1. (United States) Serena Williams (semifinals, withdrew due to knee injury)
2. (Serbia) Jelena Janković (semifinals)
3. (Russia) Elena Dementieva (final)
4. (Poland) Agnieszka Radwańska (quarterfinals)
5. (France) Alizé Cornet (quarterfinals)
6. (Switzerland) Patty Schnyder (second round)
7. (Spain) Anabel Medina Garrigues (first round)
8. (France) Amélie Mauresmo (champion)

== Draw ==
Key

- Q = Qualifier
- WC = Wild card
- LL = Lucky loser
- Alt = Alternate
- ITF = ITF entry
- PR = Protected ranking
- SR = Special ranking
- SE = Special exempt
- JE = Junior exempt
- JR = Junior Accelerator Programme entrant
- CO = College Accelerator Programme entrant
- NG = Next Gen Accelerator Program entrant
- w/o = Walkover
- r = Retired
- d = Defaulted

=== Finals ===
Semifinals
1	(United States) Serena Williams
3	(Russia) Elena Dementieva	w/o
8	(France) Amélie Mauresmo	6	0	6
2/WC	(Serbia) Jelena Janković	2	6	1

Final
3	(Russia) Elena Dementieva	6^{7}	6	4
8	(France) Amélie Mauresmo	7^{9}	2	6

=== Top half ===
First round
1	(United States) S Williams	6	6
(Czech Republic) I Benešová	1	4
(Czech Republic) P Kvitová	3	1
Q	(Croatia) K Šprem	6	6
Q	(France) É Loit	6	6
(Czech Republic) N Vaidišová	1	4
(Estonia) K Kanepi	3	6	7
7	(Spain) A Medina Garrigues	6	2	5
3	(Russia) E Dementieva	6	6
LL	(France) A Rezaï	4	3
(Russia) A Pavlyuchenkova	6	6
WC	(France) V Razzano	4	1
(Romania) S Cîrstea	2	6	2
WC	(France) N Dechy	6	1	6
(Ukraine) A Bondarenko	4	6^{3}
6	(Switzerland) P Schnyder	6	7^{7}

Second round
1	(United States) S Williams	6	6
Q	(Croatia) K Šprem	1	2
Q	(France) É Loit	2	6	6
(Estonia) K Kanepi	6	3	1
3	(Russia) E Dementieva	6	6
(Russia) A Pavlyuchenkova	4	2
WC	(France) N Dechy	3	6	6
6	(Switzerland) P Schnyder	6	4	3

Quarterfinals
1	(United States) S Williams	6	6
Q	(France) É Loit	4	1
3	(Russia) E Dementieva	6	6
WC	(France) N Dechy	3	2

Semifinals
1	(United States) S Williams
3	(Russia) E Dementieva	w/o

=== Bottom half ===
First round
8	(France) A Mauresmo	6	6
(Italy) S Errani	2	0
(Switzerland) T Bacsinszky	4	3
(Romania) M Niculescu	6	6
(Russia) A Kleybanova	6	7^{7}
(Bulgaria) T Pironkova	2	6^{3}
Q	(Ukraine) O Lyubtsova	1	1
4	(Poland) A Radwańska	6	6
5	(France) A Cornet	6	6
Q	(Latvia) A Sevastova	1	3
(Russia) E Makarova	2	2
WC	(Slovakia) D Hantuchová	6	6
(Hungary) Á Szávay	6^{6}	2
(China) N Li	7^{8}	6
(Italy) F Schiavone	5	6^{2}
2/WC	(Serbia) J Janković	7	7^{7}

Second round
8	(France) A Mauresmo	6	6
(Romania) M Niculescu	1	2
(Russia) A Kleybanova	7^{7}	4	2
4	(Poland) A Radwańska	6^{5}	6	6
5	(France) A Cornet	1	6	6
WC	(Slovakia) D Hantuchová	6	4	2
(China) N Li	0	6	2
2/WC	(Serbia) J Janković	6	3	6

Quarterfinals
8	(France) A Mauresmo	6	6
4	(Poland) A Radwańska	2	0
5	(France) A Cornet	7	4	4
2/WC	(Serbia) J Janković	5	6	6

Semifinals
8	(France) A Mauresmo	6	0	6
2/WC	(Serbia) J Janković	2	6	1
