= 2011 Open GDF Suez – Singles =

Singles
- 2011 Open GDF Suez

Final
- Champion: (Czech Republic) Petra Kvitová
- Runner-up: (Belgium) Kim Clijsters
- Score: 6–4, 6–3

Details
- Draw: 30
- Seeds: 8

Events
Singles	Doubles
← 2010 ·	Open GDF Suez	· 2012 →

Elena Dementieva was the defending champion, but she retired from the sport at the end of the 2010 season.

Petra Kvitová won the title, defeating Kim Clijsters in the final 6–4, 6–3.

By reaching the quarterfinals, Clijsters gained world No. 1 ranking for the first time since 2006. She remains the only mother to be ranked No. 1 since the inception of the computer rankings in 1975.

== Seeds ==
The top two seeds received a bye into the second round.

1. (Belgium) Kim Clijsters (final)
2. (Russia) Maria Sharapova (withdrew)
3. (Estonia) Kaia Kanepi (semifinals)
4. (Czech Republic) Petra Kvitová (champion)
5. (Russia) Nadia Petrova (second round)
6. (Germany) Andrea Petkovic (quarterfinals)
7. (Belgium) Yanina Wickmayer (quarterfinals)
8. (Slovakia) Dominika Cibulková (quarterfinals)

== Draw ==
=== Key ===
- Q = Qualifier
- WC = Wild card
- LL = Lucky loser
- Alt = Alternate
- SE = Special exempt
- PR = Protected ranking
- ITF = ITF entry
- JE = Junior exempt
- w/o = Walkover
- r = Retired
- d = Defaulted
- SR = Special ranking

=== Finals ===
Semifinals
1	(Belgium) Kim Clijsters	6	7
3	(Estonia) Kaia Kanepi	1	5
4	(Czech Republic) Petra Kvitová	6	6
(United States) Bethanie Mattek-Sands	2	0

Final
1	(Belgium) Kim Clijsters	4	3
4	(Czech Republic) Petra Kvitová	6	6

=== Top half ===
First round
(Germany) K Barrois	5	6	6
(Czech Republic) I Benešová	7	4	4
Q	(Australia) J Dokic	4	6	6
(Czech Republic) L Šafářová	6	3	4
WC	(France) V Razzano	1	3
5	(Russia) N Petrova	6	6
3	(Estonia) K Kanepi	7^{7}	6
(Latvia) A Sevastova	6^{5}	2
(France) A Cornet	2	6^{5}
(Sweden) S Arvidsson	6	7^{7}
(United States) M Oudin	7	5	6
(Russia) V Dushevina	5	7	2
Q	(Croatia) A Vrljić	0	2
8	(Slovakia) D Cibulková	6	6

Second round
1	(Belgium) K Clijsters	4	6	6
(Germany) K Barrois	6	2	0
Q	(Australia) J Dokic	6	7^{7}
5	(Russia) N Petrova	4	6^{4}
3	(Estonia) K Kanepi	6	6
(Sweden) S Arvidsson	3	4
(United States) M Oudin	4	6^{5}
8	(Slovakia) D Cibulková	6	7^{7}

Quarterfinals
1	(Belgium) K Clijsters	6	6
Q	(Australia) J Dokic	3	0
3	(Estonia) K Kanepi	6	2	6
8	(Slovakia) D Cibulková	2	6	2

Semifinals
1	(Belgium) K Clijsters	6	7
3	(Estonia) K Kanepi	1	5

=== Bottom half ===
First round
7/WC	(Belgium) Y Wickmayer	7^{7}	6
(Russia) E Vesnina	6^{1}	2
(Switzerland) T Bacsinszky	3	3
(Czech Republic) K Zakopalová	6	6
(Bulgaria) T Pironkova	6^{5}	3
(Czech Republic) B Záhlavová-Strýcová	7^{7}	6
Q	(Russia) V Manasieva	5	4
4	(Czech Republic) P Kvitová	7	6
6	(Germany) A Petkovic	7	3	6
(Germany) A Kerber	5	6	2
Q	(Slovakia) K Kučová	4	6	7^{7}
(Russia) E Makarova	6	3	6^{1}
(Spain) C Suárez Navarro	0	3
(United States) B Mattek-Sands	6	6

Second round
7/WC	(Belgium) Y Wickmayer	6	6
(Czech Republic) K Zakopalová	1	3
(Czech Republic) B Záhlavová-Strýcová	4	7^{8}	6^{9}
4	(Czech Republic) P Kvitová	6	6^{6}	7^{11}
6	(Germany) A Petkovic	6	6
Q	(Slovakia) K Kučová	4	2
(United States) B Mattek-Sands	7	6
LL	(France) S Cohen-Aloro	5	3

Quarterfinals
7/WC	(Belgium) Y Wickmayer	7	3	6^{3}
4	(Czech Republic) P Kvitová	5	6	7^{7}
6	(Germany) A Petkovic	6^{4}	6	3
(United States) B Mattek-Sands	7^{7}	2	6

Semifinals
4	(Czech Republic) P Kvitová	6	6
(United States) B Mattek-Sands	2	0
