= 1993 Open Gaz de France =

- Date: 15–21 February
- Edition: 1st
- Category: Tier II
- Draw: 32S / 16D
- Prize money: $375,000
- Surface: Carpet / indoor
- Location: Paris, France
- Venue: Zénith Hall

Champions

Singles
- (United States) Martina Navratilova

Doubles
- (Czechoslovakia) Jana Novotná / (Czechoslovakia) Andrea Strnadová
Open Gaz de France	· 1994 →

The 1993 Open Gaz de France was a women's tennis tournament played on indoor carpet courts at the Zénith Hall in Paris, France, that was part of Tier II of the 1993 WTA Tour. It was the inaugural edition of the tournament and was held from 15 February until 21 February 1993. Second-seeded Martina Navratilova won the singles title and earned $75,000 first-prize money.

== Finals ==
=== Singles ===
(United States) Martina Navratilova defeated (Socialist Federal Republic of Yugoslavia) Monica Seles 6–3, 4–6, 7–6^{(7–3)}

- It was Navratilova's 2nd singles title of the year and the 163rd of her career.

=== Doubles ===
(Czechoslovakia) Jana Novotná / (Czechoslovakia) Andrea Strnadová defeated (United Kingdom) Jo Durie / (Switzerland) Catherine Suire 7–6, 6–2
