= Open GDF Suez =

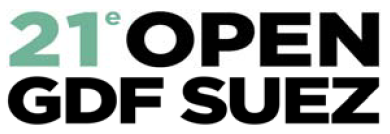

Defunct tennis tournament
- Founded: 1993
- Abolished: 2014
- Editions: 22
- Location: Paris; France
- Venue: Zénith Paris (1993); Stade Pierre de Coubertin (1994–2014)
- Category: Tier II (1993–2008); Premier (2009–2014)
- Surface: Carpet (i) until 2000; Hard (i) since 2001
- Draw: 32M/32Q/16D
- Prize money: $637,000
- Website: opengdfsuez.com

Open GDF Suez, formerly Open Gaz de France, was a Premier level tennis tournament on the WTA Tour held in Paris. Held from 1993 till 2014, the tournament was played indoors, originally on carpet until 2000, then on hardcourts. The 2014 Open GDF Suez was the last edition.

Amélie Mauresmo holds the record for the most singles titles with three in 2001, 2006 and 2009.

== Past finals ==
=== Singles ===
Year	Champion	Runner-up	Score
1993	(United States) Martina Navratilova	(Socialist Federal Republic of Yugoslavia) Monica Seles	6–3, 4–6, 7–6
1994	(United States) Martina Navratilova (2)	(France) Julie Halard	7–5, 6–3
1995	(Germany) Steffi Graf	(France) Mary Pierce	6–2, 6–2
1996	(France) Julie Halard-Decugis	(Croatia) Iva Majoli	7–5, 7–6^{(7–4)}
1997	(Switzerland) Martina Hingis	(Germany) Anke Huber	6–3, 3–6, 6–3
1998	(France) Mary Pierce	(Belgium) Dominique Monami	6–3, 7–5
1999	(United States) Serena Williams	(France) Amélie Mauresmo	6–2, 3–6, 7–6^{(7–4)}
2000	(France) Nathalie Tauziat	(United States) Serena Williams	7–5, 6–2
2001	(France) Amélie Mauresmo	(Germany) Anke Huber	7–6^{(7–2)}, 6–1
2002	(United States) Venus Williams	(Serbia and Montenegro) Jelena Dokić	w/o
2003	(United States) Serena Williams (2)	(France) Amélie Mauresmo	6–3, 6–2
2004	(Belgium) Kim Clijsters	(France) Mary Pierce	6–2, 6–1
2005	(Russia) Dinara Safina	(France) Amélie Mauresmo	6–4, 2–6, 6–3
2006	(France) Amélie Mauresmo (2)	(France) Mary Pierce	6–1, 7–6^{(7–2)}
2007	(Russia) Nadia Petrova	(Czech Republic) Lucie Šafářová	4–6, 6–1, 6–4
2008	(Russia) Anna Chakvetadze	(Hungary) Ágnes Szávay	6–3, 2–6, 6–2
2009	(France) Amélie Mauresmo (3)	(Russia) Elena Dementieva	7–6^{(9–7)}, 2–6, 6–4
2010	(Russia) Elena Dementieva	(Czech Republic) Lucie Šafářová	6–7^{(5–7)}, 6–1, 6–4
2011	(Czech Republic) Petra Kvitová	(Belgium) Kim Clijsters	6–4, 6–3
2012	(Germany) Angelique Kerber	(France) Marion Bartoli	7–6^{(7–3)}, 5–7, 6–3
2013	(Germany) Mona Barthel	(Italy) Sara Errani	7–5, 7–6^{(7–4)}
2014	(Russia) Anastasia Pavlyuchenkova	(Italy) Sara Errani	3–6, 6–2, 6–3

=== Doubles ===
Year	Champions	Runners-up	Score
1993	(Czech Republic) Jana Novotná (Czech Republic) Andrea Strnadová	(United Kingdom) Jo Durie (France) Catherine Suire	7–6, 6–2
1994	(Belgium) Sabine Appelmans (Belgium) Laurence Courtois	(France) Mary Pierce (Hungary) Andrea Temesvári	6–4, 6–4
1995	(United States) Meredith McGrath (Latvia) Larisa Neiland	(Netherlands) Manon Bollegraf (Australia) Rennae Stubbs	6–4, 6–1
1996	(Netherlands) Kristie Boogert (Czech Republic) Jana Novotná (2)	(France) Julie Halard-Decugis (France) Nathalie Tauziat	6–4, 6–3
1997	(Switzerland) Martina Hingis (Czech Republic) Jana Novotná (3)	(France) Alexandra Fusai (Italy) Rita Grande	6–1, 6–2
1998	(Belgium) Sabine Appelmans (2) (Netherlands) Miriam Oremans	(Russia) Anna Kournikova (Latvia) Larisa Neiland	1–6, 6–3, 7–6
1999	(Romania) Irina Spîrlea (Netherlands) Caroline Vis	(Russia) Elena Likhovtseva (Japan) Ai Sugiyama	7–5, 3–6, 6–3
2000	(France) Julie Halard-Decugis (France) Sandrine Testud	(France) Émilie Loit (Sweden) Åsa Carlsson	3–6, 6–3, 6–4
2001	(Croatia) Iva Majoli (France) Virginie Razzano	(United States) Kimberly Po (France) Nathalie Tauziat	6–3, 7–5
2002	(France) Nathalie Dechy (United States) Meilen Tu	(Russia) Elena Dementieva (Slovakia) Janette Husárová	w/o
2003	(Austria) Barbara Schett (Switzerland) Patty Schnyder	(France) Marion Bartoli (France) Stéphanie Cohen-Aloro	2–6, 6–2, 7–6^{(7–5)}
2004	(Austria) Barbara Schett (2) (Switzerland) Patty Schnyder (2)	(Italy) Silvia Farina Elia (Italy) Francesca Schiavone	6–3, 6–2
2005	(Czech Republic) Iveta Benešová (Czech Republic) Květa Peschke	(Spain) Anabel Medina Garrigues (Russia) Dinara Safina	6–2, 2–6, 6–2
2006	(France) Émilie Loit (Czech Republic) Květa Peschke (2)	(Zimbabwe) Cara Black (Australia) Rennae Stubbs	7–6^{(7–5)}, 6–4
2007	(Zimbabwe) Cara Black (South Africa) Liezel Huber	(Czech Republic) Gabriela Navrátilová (Czech Republic) Vladimíra Uhlířová	6–2, 6–0
2008	(Ukraine) Alyona Bondarenko (Ukraine) Kateryna Bondarenko	(Czech Republic) Eva Hrdinová (Czech Republic) Vladimíra Uhlířová	6–1, 6–4
2009	(Zimbabwe) Cara Black (2) (United States) Liezel Huber (2)	(Czech Republic) Květa Peschke (United States) Lisa Raymond	6–4, 3–6, [10–4]
2010	(Czech Republic) Iveta Benešová (2) (Czech Republic) Barbora Záhlavová-Strýcová	(Zimbabwe) Cara Black (United States) Liezel Huber	w/o
2011	(United States) Bethanie Mattek-Sands (United States) Meghann Shaughnessy	(Russia) Vera Dushevina (Russia) Ekaterina Makarova	6–4, 6–2
2012	(United States) Liezel Huber (3) (United States) Lisa Raymond	(Germany) Anna-Lena Grönefeld (Croatia) Petra Martić	7–6^{(7–3)}, 6–1
2013	(Italy) Sara Errani (Italy) Roberta Vinci	(Czech Republic) Andrea Hlaváčková (United States) Liezel Huber	6–1, 6–1
2014	(Germany) Anna-Lena Grönefeld (Czech Republic) Květa Peschke (3)	(Hungary) Tímea Babos (France) Kristina Mladenovic	6–7^{(7–9)}, 6–4, [10–5]

== See also ==
- Clarins Open, predecessor (1987–92)
- List of tennis tournaments
