= Stade Pierre de Coubertin (Paris) =

Sports arena in Paris, France

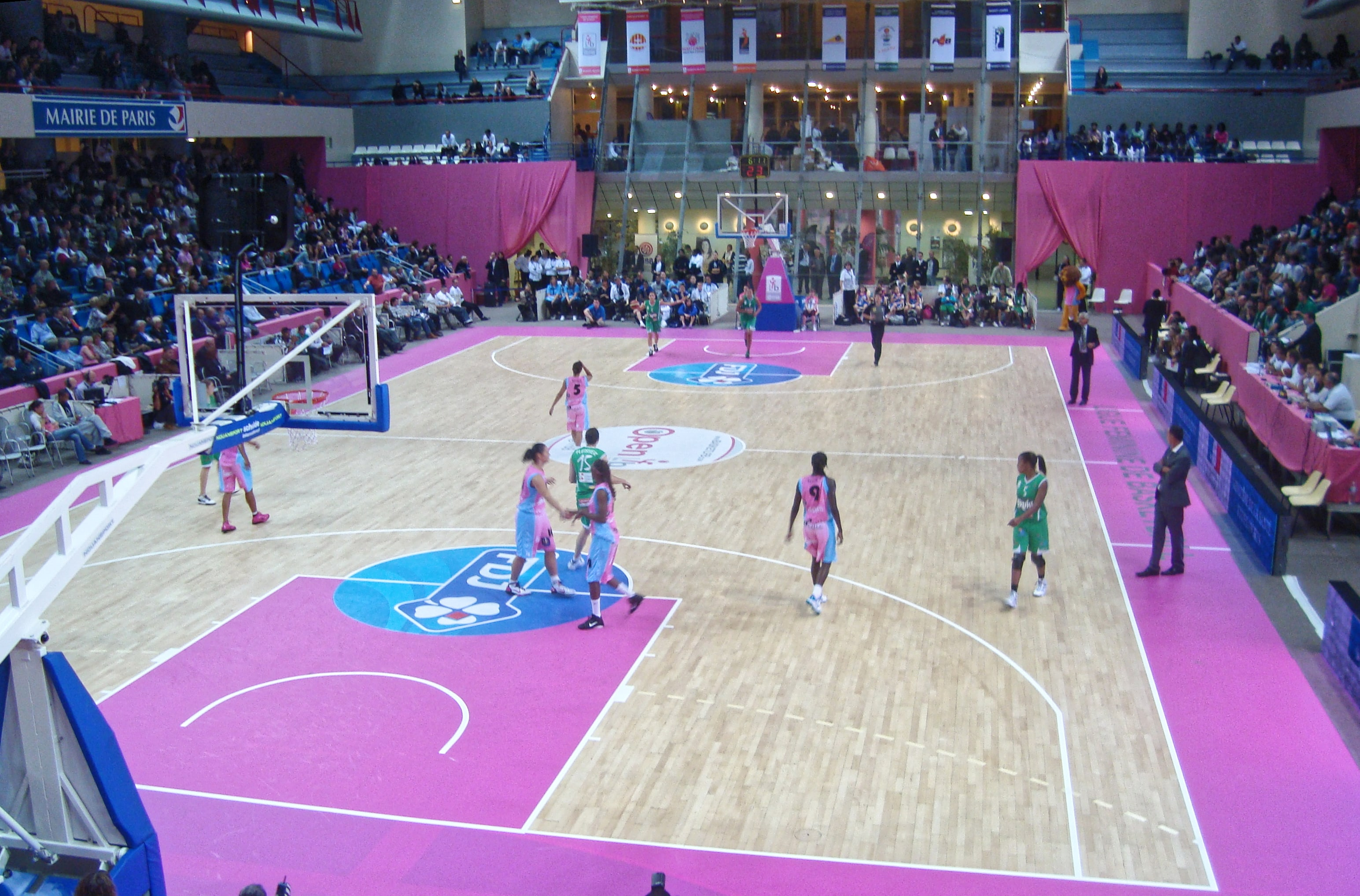
- Interactive map of Stade Pierre de Coubertin
- Location: Paris, France
- Coordinates: 48°50′07″N 2°15′22″E
- Capacity: Basketball: 4,200; Boxing: 4,836

Construction
- Opened: 1937
- Renovated: 1946, 1990
- Expanded: 1990
- Architects: Carre & Clavel; Didier Drummond (1990 renovation)

Tenants
- ATP World Tour Finals (Tennis) (1971); Open GDF Suez (Tennis) (1994–2014); French Open (Badminton); Paris Saint-Germain (Handball); Paris BR (Basketball); Levallois Sporting Club (Basketball); Paris-Levallois (Basketball); Judo Grand Slam Paris (1971–1999)

The Stade Pierre de Coubertin (French for Pierre de Coubertin Stadium) is an indoor arena that is located in Paris, France. It is the home venue of the Paris Saint-Germain Handball team. The arena has a seating capacity of 4,200 people for basketball games.

== History ==
Stade Pierre de Coubertin was opened in 1937, for the Universal Exposition, and it was rebuilt after the bombing that occurred during the Second World War. The stadium was used as a detention centre during the Paris massacre of 1961. In 1990, the arena underwent a renovation, which included a new façade, expansion of its seating capacity, and the addition of various service areas.

In addition to previously being the home arena of the basketball teams Paris BR, Levallois Sporting Club, and Paris-Levallois, each year the Stade Pierre de Coubertin also hosts various sporting events, such as the fencing Grand Prix: Challenge International de Paris (in January) and the Challenge Monal (in February), the Open Gaz de France women's tennis tournament, and the Internationaux de France de Badminton.

== See also ==
- List of indoor arenas in France

Preceded by Tokyo Metropolitan Gymnasium; Tokyo	Masters Cup; Venue; 1971	Succeeded by Palau Blaugrana; Barcelona
