= Sabine Appelmans =

Belgian tennis player

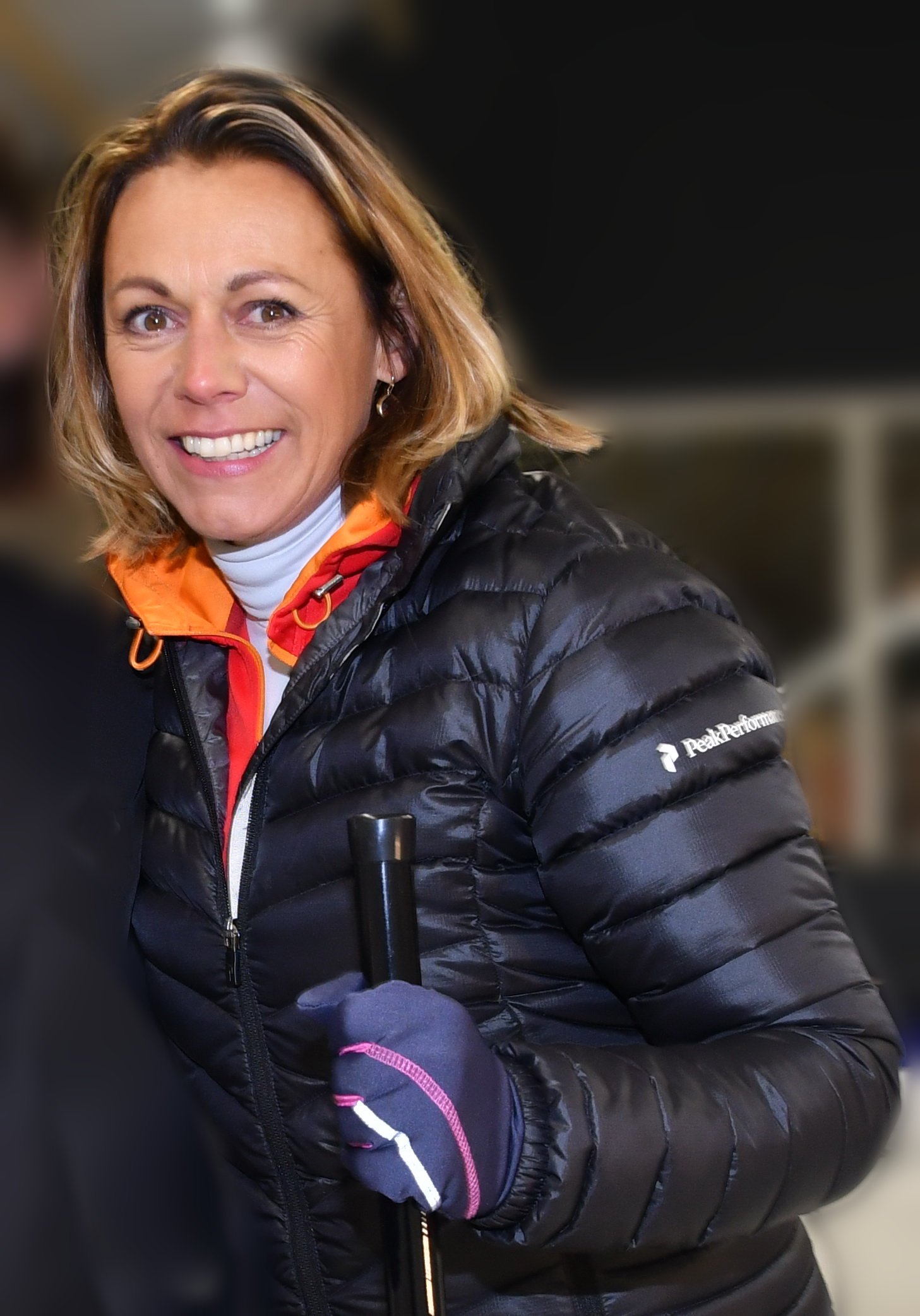
- Country (sports): Belgium
- Residence: Asse, Belgium
- Born: 22 April 1972 (age 54) Aalst, Belgium
- Height: 1.68 m (5 ft 6 in)
- Turned pro: 1988
- Retired: 2001
- Plays: Left-handed (two-handed backhand)
- Prize money: US$ 2,041,247

Singles
- Career record: 346–237 (59.3%)
- Career titles: 7 WTA, 1 ITF
- Highest ranking: No. 16 (24 November 1997)

Grand Slam singles results
- Australian Open: QF (1997)
- French Open: 4R (1991)
- Wimbledon: 4R (1996, 1997, 2000)
- US Open: 4R (1992, 1999)

Other tournaments
- Olympic Games: QF (1992)

Doubles
- Career record: 147–162 (47.6%)
- Career titles: 4 WTA, 1 ITF
- Highest ranking: No. 21 (25 August 1997)

Grand Slam doubles results
- Australian Open: QF (1991)
- French Open: 3R (1992)
- Wimbledon: SF (1997)
- US Open: 3R (1991)

Other doubles tournaments
- Olympic Games: 2R (1996)

Team competitions
- Fed Cup: 32–22

Sabine Appelmans (born 22 April 1972) is a former professional tennis player from Belgium. She was Belgium's Fed Cup captain from 2007 until 2011.

== Career ==
Appelmans started playing at the neighbour's court at the age of seven. Her first trainer, Fred Debruyn, saw immediately that she was very talented. Although right-handed, she played left-handed; at a children's tennis training session she claimed to be left-handed so she could stay with her friend in the left-handed group.

Appelmans turned pro in 1988, and won her first title against Chanda Rubin in Scottsdale in 1991. She made her first Fed Cup appearance in 1988, with a 1–2 loss against Austria. In 1997, she married Serge Haubourdin. Throughout her career, she won seven singles and four doubles titles.

She participated three times in the Olympics (in 1992, 1996 and 2000) - at the 1992 Games in Barcelona she reached the quarterfinals in singles. Her best result in the Grand Slam tournaments is reaching the quarterfinals at the 1997 Australian Open after defeating then world No. 3, Conchita Martínez. Her highest spot on the WTA rankings is the 16th place, which she reached in November 1997. In the doubles she reached, together with Miriam Oremans, the semi-finals of 1997 Wimbledon.

In February 2007, she was appointed captain of Belgium's Fed Cup squad in replacement of Carl Maes, leading the team to a semifinal in 2011. That year, she was replaced herself in October 2011 by Ann Devries.

== Awards ==
Appelmans was elected as the Belgian Sportswoman of the year 1990 & 1991. She was nominated for the Karen Krantzcke Sportsmanship Award in 1994 & 1995.

== Career statistics ==
=== Performance timeline ===
==== Singles ====
Key
W	F	SF	QF	#R	RR	Q#	DNQ	A	NH

(W) winner; (F) finalist; (SF) semifinalist; (QF) quarterfinalist; (#R) rounds 4, 3, 2, 1; (RR) round-robin stage; (Q#) qualification round; (DNQ) did not qualify; (A) absent; (NH) not held; (SR) strike rate (events won / competed); (W–L) win–loss record.

Tournament	1988	1989	1990	1991	1992	1993	1994	1995	1996	1997	1998	1999	2000	2001
Australian Open	A	A	3R	4R	1R	1R	3R	3R	4R	QF	1R	3R	3R	2R
French Open	2R	A	1R	4R	2R	2R	2R	3R	3R	1R	1R	1R	1R	A
Wimbledon	A	A	A	1R	2R	3R	1R	1R	4R	4R	3R	2R	4R	A
US Open	A	A	3R	1R	4R	2R	1R	3R	1R	1R	A	4R	1R	A
WTA Championships	A	A	A	A	A	A	A	A	A	1R	A	A	A	A

=== WTA Tour finals ===
==== Singles: 12 (7 titles, 5 runner-ups) ====
Result	W–L	Date	Tournament	Tier	Surface	Opponent	Score
Loss	0–1	Jan 1990	Auckland, New Zealand	Tier V	Hard	(Soviet Union) Leila Meskhi	1–6, 0–6
Loss	0–2	Apr 1991	Tokyo, Japan	Tier IV	Hard	(United States) Lori McNeil	6–2, 2–6, 1–6
Win	1–2	Nov 1991	Scottsdale, US	Tier IV	Hard	(United States) Chanda Rubin	7–5, 6–1
Win	2–2	Nov 1991	Brentwood, US	Tier IV	Hard (i)	(United States) Katrina Adams	6–2, 6–4
Loss	2–3	Apr 1992	Tokyo, Japan	Tier IV	Hard	(Japan) Kimiko Date	5–7, 6–3, 3–6
Win	3–3	Apr 1992	Pattaya, Thailand	Tier V	Hard	(Czech Republic) Andrea Strnadová	7–5, 3–6, 7–5
Loss	3–4	Oct 1993	Budapest, Hungary	Tier III	Carpet (i)	(United States) Zina Garrison	5–7, 2–6
Win	4–4	Feb 1994	Linz, Austria	Tier III	Carpet (i)	(Germany) Meike Babel	6–1, 4–6, 7–6^{(7–3)}
Win	5–4	Apr 1994	Pattaya, Thailand	Tier IV	Hard	(United States) Patty Fendick	6–7^{(5–7)}, 7–6^{(7–5)}, 6–2
Win	6–4	Apr 1995	Zagreb, Croatia	Tier III	Clay	(Germany) Silke Meier	6–4, 6–3
Win	7–4	Mar 1996	Linz, Austria	Tier III	Carpet (i)	(France) Julie Halard-Decugis	6–2, 6–4
Loss	7–5	Apr 1997	Budapest, Hungary	Tier IV	Clay	(South Africa) Amanda Coetzer	1–6, 3–6

==== Doubles: 14 (4 titles, 10 runner-ups) ====
Result	W/L	Date	Tournament	Surface	Partner	Opponents	Score
Loss	0–1	Feb 1991	Oslo Open, Norway	Carpet (i)	(Italy) Raffaella Reggi	(West Germany) Claudia Kohde-Kilsch (West Germany) Silke Meier	6–3, 3–6, 4–6
Loss	0–2	Sep 1991	Milan Indoor, Italy	Carpet (i)	(Italy) Raffaella Reggi	(United States) Sandy Collins (United States) Lori McNeil	6–7^{(0–7)}, 3–6
Loss	0–3	Oct 1991	Puerto Rico Open	Hard	(United States) Camille Benjamin	(Japan) Rika Hiraki (Argentina) Florencia Labat	3–6, 3–6
Loss	0–4	Feb 1992	Faber Grand Prix, Germany	Carpet (i)	(Germany) Claudia Porwik	(Bulgaria) Katerina Maleeva (Germany) Barbara Rittner	5–7, 3–6
Loss	0–5	Feb 1992	Cesena Championship, Italy	Carpet (i)	(Italy) Raffaella Reggi	(France) Catherine Suire (France) Catherine Tanvier	w/o
Win	1–5	Feb 1994	Paris Indoor, France	Carpet (i)	(Belgium) Laurence Courtois	(France) Mary Pierce (Hungary) Andrea Temesvári	6–4, 6–4
Loss	1–6	May 1995	Internationaux de Strasbourg, France	Hard (i)	(Netherlands) Miriam Oremans	(United States) Lindsay Davenport (United States) Mary Joe Fernandez	2–6, 3–6
Loss	1–7	May 1996	Madrid Open, Spain	Clay	(Netherlands) Miriam Oremans	(Czech Republic) Jana Novotná (Spain) Arantxa Sánchez Vicario	6–7, 2–6
Loss	1–8	Oct 1996	Sparkassen Cup, Germany	Carpet (i)	(Netherlands) Miriam Oremans	(Netherlands) Kristie Boogert (France) Nathalie Tauziat	4–6, 4–6
Loss	1–9	Mar 1997	Key Biscayne Open, United States	Hard	(Netherlands) Miriam Oremans	(Spain) Arantxa Sánchez Vicario (Belarus) Natasha Zvereva	2–6, 3–6
Win	2–9	Feb 1998	Paris Indoor, France	Carpet (i)	(Netherlands) Miriam Oremans	(Russia) Anna Kournikova (Latvia) Larisa Neiland	1–6, 6–3, 7–6^{(7–3)}
Win	3–9	Jun 1998	Rosmalen Championships, Netherlands	Grass	(Netherlands) Miriam Oremans	(Romania) Cătălina Cristea (Czech Republic) Eva Melicharová	6–7^{(4–7)}, 7–6^{(8–6)}, 7–6^{(7–5)}
Loss	3–10	Jan 2000	Australian Hardcourts	Hard	(Italy) Rita Grande	(France) Julie Halard-Decugis (Russia) Anna Kournikova	3–6, 0–6
Win	4–10	May 2000	Belgian Open	Clay	(Belgium) Kim Clijsters	(United States) Jennifer Hopkins (Slovenia) Petra Rampre	6–1, 6–1

=== ITF finals ===
$50,000 tournaments
$25,000 tournaments
$10,000 tournaments

==== Singles: 4 (1–3) ====
Result	No.	Date	Tournament	Surface	Opponent	Score
Loss	1.	10 April 1988	ITF Bari, Italy	Clay	(Austria) Petra Schwarz	3–6, 4–6
Loss	2.	24 July 1989	ITF Kitzbühel, Austria	Clay	(Italy) Federica Bonsignori	3–6, 6–4, 6–7^{(2)}
Loss	3.	12 June 1989	ITF Porto, Portugal	Clay	(Switzerland) Emanuela Zardo	5–7, 3–6
Win	4.	26 April 1993	ITF Porto, Portugal	Clay	(Slovenia) Barbara Mulej	2–6, 7–6^{(1)}, 7–5

==== Doubles: 2 (1–1) ====
Result	No.	Date	Tournament	Surface	Partner	Opponents	Score
Win	1.	16 August 1987	ITF Koksijde, Belgium	Clay	(Belgium) Caroline van Renterghem	(Belgium) Kathleen Schuurmans (United Kingdom) Joy Tacon	6–7^{(2)}, 6–2, 7–6^{(3)}
Loss	2.	7 December 1992	ITF Val-d'Oise, France	Hard (i)	(France) Julie Halard-Decugis	(France) Isabelle Demongeot (France) Catherine Suire	5–7, 4–6
