= 2002 Challenge Bell – Doubles =

Doubles
- 2002 Challenge Bell

Final
- Champions: (United States) Samantha Reeves (South Africa) Jessica Steck
- Runners-up: (Argentina) María Emilia Salerni (Colombia) Fabiola Zuluaga
- Score: 4–6, 6–3, 7–5

Details
- Draw: 16
- Seeds: 4

Events
Singles	Doubles
← 2001 ·	Tournoi de Québec	· 2003 →

Samantha Reeves and Adriana Serra Zanetti were the defending champions, but Serra Zanetti decided not to participate this year.

Reeves partnered with Jessica Steck and successfully defended her title, defeating María Emilia Salerni and Fabiola Zuluaga 4–6, 6–3, 7–5 in the final.

== Seeds ==
1. (France) Émilie Loit / (Paraguay) Rossana Neffa-de los Ríos (first round)
2. (Russia) Anastasia Rodionova / (Germany) Marlene Weingärtner (first round)
3. (United States) Samantha Reeves / (South Africa) Jessica Steck (champions)
4. (Germany) Andrea Glass / (Bulgaria) Magdalena Maleeva (quarterfinals)

== Draw ==
=== Key ===
- Q = Qualifier
- WC = Wild card
- LL = Lucky loser
- Alt = Alternate
- SE = Special exempt
- PR = Protected ranking
- ITF = ITF entry
- JE = Junior exempt
- w/o = Walkover
- r = Retired
- d = Defaulted
- SR = Special ranking

First round
1	(France) É Loit (Paraguay) R Neffa-de los Ríos	2	6^{7}
(Germany) K Freye (Germany) A Rösch	6	7^{9}
(Canada) M Drake (Canada) M Marois	6	6
(Republic of Ireland) K Liggan (Netherlands) J Mens	2	2
3	(United States) S Reeves (South Africa) J Steck	6	6
(South Africa) K Grant (Canada) M-È Pelletier	3	3
(United States) L Granville (United States) J Hopkins	6	7
WC	(Canada) J Nejedly (Canada) I Plesu	2	5
(Canada) K Ionesco (Luxembourg) A Kremer	1	2
(Argentina) ME Salerni (Colombia) F Zuluaga	6	6
Q	(Germany) G Arn (Armenia) M-G Mikaelian	0	6	6^{2}
4	(Germany) A Glass (Bulgaria) M Maleeva	6	3	7^{7}
(Russia) A Jidkova (United States) J Trail	6	6
(United States) K Hyndman (United States) B Rippner	0	2
(United States) E Schmidt (Netherlands) A van Exel	6	6
2	(Russia) A Rodionova (Germany) M Weingärtner	4	1

Quarterfinals
(Germany) K Freye (Germany) A Rösch	6^{6}	7	6
(Canada) M Drake (Canada) M Marois	7^{8}	5	4
3	(United States) S Reeves (South Africa) J Steck	6	6
(United States) L Granville (United States) J Hopkins	2	4
(Argentina) ME Salerni (Colombia) F Zuluaga	6	6
4	(Germany) A Glass (Bulgaria) M Maleeva	4	4
(Russia) A Jidkova (United States) J Trail	4	4
(United States) E Schmidt (Netherlands) A van Exel	6	6

Semifinals
(Germany) K Freye (Germany) A Rösch	3	4
3	(United States) S Reeves (South Africa) J Steck	6	6
(Argentina) ME Salerni (Colombia) F Zuluaga	6	6
(United States) E Schmidt (Netherlands) A van Exel	2	1

Final
3	(United States) S Reeves (South Africa) J Steck	4	6	7
(Argentina) ME Salerni (Colombia) F Zuluaga	6	3	5
