= 2002 Challenge Bell – Singles =

Singles
- 2002 Challenge Bell

Final
- Champion: (Russia) Elena Bovina
- Runner-up: (Armenia) Marie-Gaïané Mikaelian
- Score: 6–3, 6–4

Details
- Draw: 30
- Seeds: 8

Events
Singles	Doubles
← 2001 ·	Tournoi de Québec	· 2003 →

Meghann Shaughnessy was the defending champion, but lost in the second round to Marie-Gaïané Mikaelian.

Elena Bovina won the title, defeating Mikaelian 6–3, 6–4 in the final.

== Seeds ==
1. (Italy) Silvia Farina Elia (semifinals)
2. (Russia) Elena Dementieva (second round)
3. (Bulgaria) Magdalena Maleeva (quarterfinals)
4. (Luxembourg) Anne Kremer (first round)
5. (United States) Meghann Shaughnessy (second round)
6. (United States) Alexandra Stevenson (quarterfinals)
7. (Russia) Elena Bovina (champion)
8. (United States) Meilen Tu (second round)

== Draw ==
=== Key ===
- Q = Qualifier
- WC = Wild card
- LL = Lucky loser
- Alt = Alternate
- SE = Special exempt
- PR = Protected ranking
- ITF = ITF entry
- JE = Junior exempt
- w/o = Walkover
- r = Retired
- d = Defaulted
- SR = Special ranking

=== Finals ===
Semifinals
1	(Italy) Silvia Farina Elia	6^{3}	1
(Armenia) Marie-Gaïané Mikaelian	7^{7}	6
Q	(Russia) Anastasia Rodionova	1	0
7	(Russia) Elena Bovina	6	6

Final
(Armenia) Marie-Gaïané Mikaelian	3	4
7	(Russia) Elena Bovina	6	6

=== Top half ===
First round
(Sweden) Å Svensson	7^{7}	3	2
(United States) L Granville	6^{5}	6	6
(Germany) G Arn	6	6^{2}	6^{4}
(Paraguay) R Neffa-de los Ríos	0	7^{7}	7^{7}
(Argentina) ME Salerni	4	1
6	(United States) A Stevenson	6	6
3	(Bulgaria) M Maleeva	6	6
Q	(South Africa) J Steck	4	3
Q	(Netherlands) A van Exel	6	7^{10}
(France) É Loit	1	6^{8}
(Armenia) M-G Mikaelian	6	6
WC	(Canada) M-È Pelletier	3	3
(Russia) A Jidkova	3	6	6^{2}
5	(United States) M Shaughnessy	6	3	7^{7}

Second round
1	(Italy) S Farina Elia	6	6
(United States) L Granville	1	4
(Paraguay) R Neffa-de los Ríos	1	4
6	(United States) A Stevenson	6	6
3	(Bulgaria) M Maleeva	6	2	6
Q	(Netherlands) A van Exel	4	6	3
(Armenia) M-G Mikaelian	6	6
5	(United States) M Shaughnessy	4	4

Quarterfinals
1	(Italy) S Farina Elia	6	3	6
6	(United States) A Stevenson	2	6	1
3	(Bulgaria) M Maleeva	1	1
(Armenia) M-G Mikaelian	6	6

Semifinals
1	(Italy) S Farina Elia	6^{3}	1
(Armenia) M-G Mikaelian	7^{7}	6

=== Bottom half ===
First round
8	(United States) M Tu	2	7^{7}	6
PR	(United States) B Rippner	6	6^{3}	1
Q	(Russia) A Rodionova	6	6
(United States) J Hopkins	1	1
(Germany) M Weingärtner	4	6	6
WC	(Canada) M Marois	6	3	4
(Canada) M Drake	6	7
4	(Luxembourg) A Kremer	4	5
7	(Russia) E Bovina	6	6
(Canada) J Nejedly	1	4
(Colombia) F Zuluaga	6	6
(United States) S Reeves	2	3
(Germany) A Roesch	6	7^{7}
Q	(Republic of Ireland) K Liggan	3	6^{5}

Second round
8	(United States) M Tu	6^{5}	5
Q	(Russia) A Rodionova	7^{7}	7
(Germany) M Weingärtner	6	6^{5}	6
(Canada) M Drake	1	7^{7}	4
7	(Russia) E Bovina	4	7^{7}	6
(Colombia) F Zuluaga	6	6^{3}	3
(Germany) A Roesch	7^{7}	6^{1}	6
2	(Russia) E Dementieva	6^{0}	7^{7}	4

Quarterfinals
Q	(Russia) A Rodionova	7^{7}	6
(Germany) M Weingärtner	6^{4}	0
7	(Russia) E Bovina	6	6
(Germany) A Roesch	2	0

Semifinals
Q	(Russia) A Rodionova	1	0
7	(Russia) E Bovina	6	6
