= 2003 Challenge Bell – Singles =

Singles
- 2003 Challenge Bell

Final
- Champion: (Russia) Maria Sharapova
- Runner-up: (Venezuela) Milagros Sequera
- Score: 6–2, retired

Details
- Draw: 30
- Seeds: 8

Events
Singles	Doubles
← 2002 ·	Tournoi de Québec	· 2004 →

Elena Bovina was the defending champion, but decided not to participate this year.

Maria Sharapova won the title, defeating Milagros Sequera 6–2, retired in the final.

== Seeds ==
1. (France) Mary Pierce (semifinals)
2. (Russia) Maria Sharapova (champion)
3. (Australia) Alicia Molik (withdrew)
4. (United States) Laura Granville (semifinals)
5. (Switzerland) Emmanuelle Gagliardi (withdrew)
6. (France) Marion Bartoli (quarterfinals)
7. (Germany) Anca Barna (second round)
8. (Czech Republic) Klára Koukalová (first round)
9. (Italy) Rita Grande (second round)
10. (United States) Samantha Reeves (first round)

== Draw ==
=== Key ===
- Q = Qualifier
- WC = Wild card
- LL = Lucky loser
- Alt = Alternate
- SE = Special exempt
- PR = Protected ranking
- ITF = ITF entry
- JE = Junior exempt
- w/o = Walkover
- r = Retired
- d = Defaulted
- SR = Special ranking

=== Finals ===
Semifinals
1	(France) Mary Pierce	4	0
(Venezuela) Milagros Sequera	6	6
4	(United States) Laura Granville	6	2	2
2	(Russia) Maria Sharapova	1	6	6

Final
(Venezuela) Milagros Sequera	2	0^{r}
2	(Russia) Maria Sharapova	6	0

=== Top half ===
First round
(United States) J Craybas	6^{1}	6	2
(Czech Republic) I Benešová	7^{7}	4	6
(Germany) J Schruff	3	3
(Slovakia) Ľ Kurhajcová	6	6
(Italy) Ad Serra Zanetti	6^{3}	6	4
9	(Italy) R Grande	7^{7}	0	6
6	(France) M Bartoli	6	6
WC	(Canada) M-È Pelletier	4	2
Q	(Sweden) S Arvidsson	6^{2}	6	7
Q	(United States) M Washington	7^{7}	2	5
(Venezuela) M Sequera	6	6
Q	(United States) M Tu	4	0
(Canada) M Drake	6	2	6
10	(United States) S Reeves	3	6	4

Second round
1	(France) M Pierce	6	7^{7}
(Czech Republic) I Benešová	4	6^{3}
(Slovakia) Ľ Kurhajcová	6	6
9	(Italy) R Grande	3	4
6	(France) M Bartoli	7^{7}	6
Q	(Sweden) S Arvidsson	6^{5}	3
(Venezuela) M Sequera	6^{4}	6	6
(Canada) M Drake	7^{7}	1	2

Quarterfinals
1	(France) M Pierce	6	6
(Slovakia) Ľ Kurhajcová	3	3
6	(France) M Bartoli	6	3	1
(Venezuela) M Sequera	1	6	6

Semifinals
1	(France) M Pierce	4	0
(Venezuela) M Sequera	6	6

=== Bottom half ===
First round
8	(Czech Republic) K Koukalová	4	0
(Italy) An Serra Zanetti	6	6
WC	(Canada) M Marois	2	0
(China) J Zheng	6	6
(United States) S Taylor	2	7^{7}	2
Q	(Argentina) G Dulko	6	6^{2}	6
(Puerto Rico) K Brandi	4	2
4	(United States) L Granville	6	6
7	(Germany) A Barna	7	6
(Slovakia) E Fislová	5	3
(United States) A Cargill	3	1
(Russia) A Jidkova	6	6
(Belgium) E Callens	6	4	6
(Japan) M Saeki	3	6	2

Second round
(Italy) An Serra Zanetti	3	2
(China) J Zheng	6	6
Q	(Argentina) G Dulko	6^{3}	3
4	(United States) L Granville	7^{7}	6
7	(Germany) A Barna	6	5	1
(Russia) A Jidkova	1	7	6
(Belgium) E Callens	4	3
2	(Russia) M Sharapova	6	6

Quarterfinals
(China) J Zheng	7	4	5
4	(United States) L Granville	5	6	7
(Russia) A Jidkova	1	2
2	(Russia) M Sharapova	6	6

Semifinals
4	(United States) L Granville	6	2	2
2	(Russia) M Sharapova	1	6	6
