= 2003 Pacific Life Open – Women's doubles =

Women's doubles
- 2003 Pacific Life Open

Final
- Champions: (United States) Lindsay Davenport (United States) Lisa Raymond
- Runners-up: (Belgium) Kim Clijsters (Japan) Ai Sugiyama
- Score: 3–6, 6–4, 6–1

Details
- Draw: 32 (1WC/1Q/2LL)
- Seeds: 8

Events
Singles	men	women
Doubles	men	women
← 2002 ·	Indian Wells Masters	· 2004 →

Lisa Raymond and Rennae Stubbs were the defending champions but they competed with different partners that year, Raymond with Lindsay Davenport and Stubbs with Elena Bovina.

Bovina and Stubbs lost in the quarterfinals to Jelena Dokić and Nadia Petrova.

Davenport and Raymond won in the final 3–6, 6–4, 6–1 against Kim Clijsters and Ai Sugiyama.

== Seeds ==
Champion seeds are indicated in bold text while text in italics indicates the round in which those seeds were eliminated.

1. (Spain) Virginia Ruano Pascual / (Argentina) Paola Suárez (semifinals)
2. (Zimbabwe) Cara Black / (Russia) Elena Likhovtseva (quarterfinals)
3. (Belgium) Kim Clijsters / (Japan) Ai Sugiyama (final)
4. (Russia) Elena Bovina / (Australia) Rennae Stubbs (quarterfinals)
5. (Slovakia) Janette Husárová / (Russia) Svetlana Kuznetsova (second round)
6. (Slovakia) Daniela Hantuchová / (United States) Meghann Shaughnessy (first round)
7. (Federal Republic of Yugoslavia) Jelena Dokić / (Russia) Nadia Petrova (semifinals)
8. (United States) **Lindsay Davenport** / (United States) **Lisa Raymond (champions)**

== Draw ==
=== Key ===
- Q = Qualifier
- WC = Wild card
- LL = Lucky loser
- Alt = Alternate
- SE = Special exempt
- PR = Protected ranking
- ITF = ITF entry
- JE = Junior exempt
- w/o = Walkover
- r = Retired
- d = Defaulted
- SR = Special ranking

=== Final ===
Final
3	(Belgium) Kim Clijsters (Japan) Ai Sugiyama	**6**	4	1
8	(United States) **Lindsay Davenport** (United States) **Lisa Raymond**	3	**6**	**6**

=== Top half ===
First round
1	(Spain) **V Ruano Pascual** (Argentina) **P Suárez**	**6**	**6**
(Paraguay) R Neffa-de los Ríos (United States) M Tu	2	1
(Czech Republic) D Bedáňová (Uzbekistan) I Tulyaganova	**6**	3	6^{3}
(Belgium) **E Callens** (Sweden) **Å Svensson**	3	**6**	**7^{7}**
(Austria) **B Schett** (Austria) **P Wartusch**	**7**	**7^{7}**
(Spain) M Marrero (Spain) M Serna	5	6^{5}
(Switzerland) **E Gagliardi** (Hungary) **P Mandula**	**6**	**6**
6	(Slovakia) D Hantuchová (United States) M Shaughnessy	4	0
3	(Belgium) **K Clijsters** (Japan) **A Sugiyama**	**6**	**6**
LL	(Germany) M Müller (Germany) A Roesch	4	0
(South Africa) N de Villiers (Canada) S Jeyaseelan	4	6^{5}
(Italy) **S Farina Elia** (Russia) **A Jidkova**	**6**	**7^{7}**
(South Africa) A Coetzer (South Africa) J Steck	2	**6**	6^{8}
(Russia) **E Dementieva** (Italy) **R Grande**	**6**	2	**7^{10}**
(Argentina) P Tarabini (Indonesia) A Widjaja	2	6^{5}
5	(Slovakia) **J Husárová** (Russia) **S Kuznetsova**	**6**	**7^{7}**

Second round
1	(Spain) **V Ruano Pascual** (Argentina) **P Suárez**	**6**	**6**
(Belgium) E Callens (Sweden) Å Svensson	4	1
(Austria) B Schett (Austria) P Wartusch	**6**	4	1
(Switzerland) **E Gagliardi** (Hungary) **P Mandula**	2	**6**	**6**
3	(Belgium) **K Clijsters** (Japan) **A Sugiyama**	**6**	**6**
(Italy) S Farina Elia (Russia) A Jidkova	2	3
(Russia) **E Dementieva** (Italy) **R Grande**	**w/o**
5	(Slovakia) J Husárová (Russia) S Kuznetsova

Quarterfinals
1	(Spain) **V Ruano Pascual** (Argentina) **P Suárez**	**7^{8}**	**6**
(Switzerland) E Gagliardi (Hungary) P Mandula	6^{6}	1
3	(Belgium) **K Clijsters** (Japan) **A Sugiyama**	**6**	**6**
(Russia) E Dementieva (Italy) R Grande	4	0

Semifinals
1	(Spain) V Ruano Pascual (Argentina) P Suárez	1	1	r
3	(Belgium) **K Clijsters** (Japan) **A Sugiyama**	**6**	**1**

=== Bottom half ===
First round
7	(Federal Republic of Yugoslavia) **J Dokić** (Russia) **N Petrova**	**7**	**6**
(Australia) T Musgrave (United States) A Spears	5	1
(Croatia) **J Kostanić** (Slovakia) **H Nagyová**	**6**	**7**
Q	(Italy) F Pennetta (Argentina) M E Salerni	4	5
LL	(United States) S Reeves (Venezuela) M Sequera	1	1
(South Africa) **L Huber** (Spain) **C Martínez**	**6**	**6**
(France) N Dechy (France) É Loit	1	4
4	(Russia) **E Bovina** (Australia) **R Stubbs**	**6**	**6**
8	(United States) **L Davenport** (United States) **L Raymond**	**7**	**6**
(Slovenia) T Križan (Slovenia) K Srebotnik	5	4
(Germany) B Rittner (Venezuela) M Vento-Kabchi	**7**	1	4
WC	(Russia) **A Myskina** (Russia) **D Safina**	5	**6**	**6**
(Japan) **S Asagoe** (Japan) **N Miyagi**	**6**	**6**
(Russia) E Kulikovskaya (Belarus) T Poutchek	3	2
(Chinese Taipei) J Lee (Indonesia) W Prakusya	2	**6**	2
2	(Zimbabwe) **C Black** (Russia) **E Likhovtseva**	**6**	0	**6**

Second round
7	(Federal Republic of Yugoslavia) **J Dokić** (Russia) **N Petrova**	**6**	**7^{7}**
(Croatia) J Kostanić (Slovakia) H Nagyová	1	6^{4}
(South Africa) L Huber (Spain) C Martínez	5	2
4	(Russia) **E Bovina** (Australia) **R Stubbs**	**7**	**6**
8	(United States) **L Davenport** (United States) **L Raymond**	**6**	**6**
WC	(Russia) A Myskina (Russia) D Safina	1	2
(Japan) S Asagoe (Japan) N Miyagi	4	1
2	(Zimbabwe) **C Black** (Russia) **E Likhovtseva**	**6**	**6**

Quarterfinals
7	(Federal Republic of Yugoslavia) **J Dokić** (Russia) **N Petrova**	1	**6**	**6**
4	(Russia) E Bovina (Australia) R Stubbs	**6**	2	4
8	(United States) **L Davenport** (United States) **L Raymond**	2	**6**	**7**
2	(Zimbabwe) C Black (Russia) E Likhovtseva	**6**	1	5

Semifinals
7	(Federal Republic of Yugoslavia) J Dokić (Russia) N Petrova	4	4
8	(United States) **L Davenport** (United States) **L Raymond**	**6**	**6**

== Qualifying ==
=== Qualifying seeds ===
1. (Ukraine) Tatiana Perebiynis / (Netherlands) Caroline Vis (first round)
2. **(Italy) Flavia Pennetta / (Argentina) María Emilia Salerni (qualified)**

=== Qualifiers ===
1. **(Italy) Flavia Pennetta / (Argentina) María Emilia Salerni**

=== Lucky losers ===
1. **(United States) Samantha Reeves / (Venezuela) Milagros Sequera**
2. **(Germany) Martina Müller / (Germany) Angelika Rösch**

=== Qualifying draw ===
First round
1	(Ukraine) T Perebiynis (Netherlands) C Vis	6
**(Germany) M Müller** **(Germany) A Rösch**	**8**
WC	(Switzerland) M Casanova (Russia) M Sharapova	5
**(United States) S Reeves** **(Venezuela) M Sequera**	**8**
(Russia) T Panova (Russia) A Rodionova	4
**(Hungary) Z Gubacsi** **(Czech Republic) R Voráčová**	**8**
(United States) A Augustus (Australia) B Stewart	1
2	**(Italy) F Pennetta** **(Argentina) ME Salerni**	**8**

Second round
(Germany) M Müller (Germany) A Rösch	2
**(United States) S Reeves** **(Venezuela) M Sequera**	**8**
(Hungary) Z Gubacsi (Czech Republic) R Voráčová	4
2	**(Italy) F Pennetta** **(Argentina) ME Salerni**	**8**

Qualifying competition
(United States) S Reeves (Venezuela) M Sequera	4	3
2	**(Italy) F Pennetta** **(Argentina) ME Salerni**	**6**	**6**
