= 2002 Challenge Bell =

- Date: September 16–22
- Edition: 10th
- Category: WTA Tier III
- Draw: 30S (22Q) / 16D (4Q)
- Prize money: US$170,000
- Surface: Carpet – indoors
- Location: Quebec City, Canada
- Venue: Club Avantage Multi-Sports

Champions

Singles
- (Russia) Elena Bovina

Doubles
- (United States) Samantha Reeves / (South Africa) Jessica Steck
← 2001 ·	Tournoi de Québec	· 2003 →

The 2002 Challenge Bell was a women's tennis tournament played on indoor carpet courts at the Club Avantage Multi-Sports in Quebec City in Canada that was part of Tier III of the 2002 WTA Tour. It was the 10th edition of the Challenge Bell, and was held from September 16 through September 22, 2002. Seventh-seeded Elena Bovina won the singles title.

== Finals ==
=== Singles ===
(Russia) Elena Bovina defeated (Armenia) Marie-Gaïané Mikaelian, 6–3, 6–4

- It was Bovina's 2nd title of the year and the 2nd of her career.

=== Doubles ===
(United States) Samantha Reeves / (South Africa) Jessica Steck defeated (Argentina) María Emilia Salerni / (Colombia) Fabiola Zuluaga, 4–6, 6–3, 7–5

- It was Reeves' only title of the year and the 2nd of her career. It was Steck's only title of the year and the 1st of her career.
