= 2004 Challenge Bell – Doubles =

Doubles
- 2004 Challenge Bell

Final
- Champions: (United States) Carly Gullickson (Argentina) María Emilia Salerni
- Runners-up: (Belgium) Els Callens (Australia) Samantha Stosur
- Score: 7–5, 7–5

Details
- Draw: 16
- Seeds: 4

Events
| Singles | Doubles |
| ← 2003 · | Tournoi de Québec | · 2005 → |

Li Ting and Sun Tiantian were the defending champions, but decided not to participate this year.

Carly Gullickson and María Emilia Salerni won the title, defeating Els Callens and Samantha Stosur 7–5, 7–5 in the final.

== Seeds ==
1. (Luxembourg) Claudine Schaul / (Thailand) Tamarine Tanasugarn (first round)
2. (Belgium) Els Callens / (Australia) Samantha Stosur (final)
3. (United States) Jennifer Hopkins / (United States) Mashona Washington (semifinals)
4. (United States) Jill Craybas / (United States) Abigail Spears (first round)

== Draw ==
=== Key ===
- Q = Qualifier
- WC = Wild card
- LL = Lucky loser
- Alt = Alternate
- SE = Special exempt
- PR = Protected ranking
- ITF = ITF entry
- JE = Junior exempt
- w/o = Walkover
- r = Retired
- d = Defaulted
- SR = Special ranking

First round
1 | (Luxembourg) C Schaul (Thailand) T Tanasugarn | 2 | 3
(Sweden) S Arvidsson (Republic of Ireland) K Liggan | 6 | 6
(United States) C Gullickson (Argentina) ME Salerni | 7 | 6
(Slovakia) Ľ Kurhajcová (Canada) M-È Pelletier | 5 | 2
3 | (United States) J Hopkins (United States) M Washington | 6 | 6
(France) S Foretz (Italy) A Serra Zanetti | 0 | 2
(United States) J Lehnhoff (France) C Pin | 7 | 6
(Latvia) L Dekmeijere (Russia) E Vesnina | 5 | 3
(Russia) A Jidkova (United States) L Lee-Waters | w/o
(Canada) M Marois (France) M Pierce
(United States) L Granville (United States) S Perry | 6 | 6
4 | (United States) J Craybas (United States) A Spears | 1 | 1
WC | (Canada) S Dubois (Canada) M Gloria | 7 | 2 | 2
Q | (Ukraine) K Bondarenko (Canada) A Soukup | 5 | 6 | 6
(Germany) Ad Barna (Germany) An Barna | 6^{4} | 3
2 | (Belgium) E Callens (Australia) S Stosur | 7^{7} | 6

Quarterfinals
(Sweden) S Arvidsson (Republic of Ireland) K Liggan | 5 | 2
(United States) C Gullickson (Argentina) ME Salerni | 7 | 6
3 | (United States) J Hopkins (United States) M Washington | 6 | 6
(United States) J Lehnhoff (France) C Pin | 0 | 0
(Russia) A Jidkova (United States) L Lee-Waters | 6 | 6
(United States) L Granville (United States) S Perry | 4 | 2
(Ukraine) K Bondarenko (Canada) A Soukup | 4 | 5
2 | (Belgium) E Callens (Australia) S Stosur | 6 | 7

Semifinals
(United States) C Gullickson (Argentina) ME Salerni | 7 | 7^{8}
3 | (United States) J Hopkins (United States) M Washington | 5 | 6^{6}
(Russia) A Jidkova (United States) L Lee-Waters | 6 | 3 | 2
2 | (Belgium) E Callens (Australia) S Stosur | 4 | 6 | 6

Final
(United States) C Gullickson (Argentina) ME Salerni | 7 | 7
2 | (Belgium) E Callens (Australia) S Stosur | 5 | 5
