= 2001 Challenge Bell – Singles =

Singles
- 2001 Challenge Bell

Final
- Champion: (United States) Meghann Shaughnessy
- Runner-up: (Croatia) Iva Majoli
- Score: 6–1, 6–3

Details
- Draw: 30
- Seeds: 8

Events
Singles	Doubles
← 2000 ·	Tournoi de Québec	· 2002 →

Chanda Rubin was the defending champion, but decided not to participate this year.

Meghann Shaughnessy won the title, defeating Iva Majoli 6–1, 6–3 in the final.

== Seeds ==
1. (United States) Meghann Shaughnessy (champion)
2. (Italy) Silvia Farina Elia (second round)
3. (Luxembourg) Anne Kremer (semifinals)
4. (Croatia) Iva Majoli (final)
5. (United States) Jennifer Hopkins (quarterfinals)
6. (France) Nathalie Dechy (second round)
7. (United States) Lilia Osterloh (second round)
8. (Canada) Jana Nejedly (quarterfinals)

== Draw ==
Key

- Q = Qualifier
- WC = Wild card
- LL = Lucky loser
- Alt = Alternate
- ITF = ITF entry
- PR = Protected ranking
- SR = Special ranking
- SE = Special exempt
- JE = Junior exempt
- JR = Junior Accelerator Programme entrant
- CO = College Accelerator Programme entrant
- NG = Next Gen Accelerator Program entrant
- w/o = Walkover
- r = Retired
- d = Defaulted

=== Finals ===
Semifinals
1	(United States) Meghann Shaughnessy	7^{7}	6
3	(Luxembourg) Anne Kremer	6^{5}	2
4	(Croatia) Iva Majoli	6	7
(Slovakia) Martina Suchá	4	5

Final
1	(United States) Meghann Shaughnessy	6	6
4	(Croatia) Iva Majoli	1	3

=== Top half ===
First round
(Germany) G Arn	6	6
LL	(United States) T Dabek	2	2
(United States) A Stevenson	6	6
Q	(Republic of Ireland) K Liggan	3	4
Q	(Canada) S Jeyaseelan	6^{5}	2
7	(United States) L Osterloh	7^{7}	6
3	(Luxembourg) A Kremer	6	6
LL	(Canada) D Srebrovic	2	0
(Czech Republic) K Koukalová	4	4
(Colombia) C Castaño	6	6
(Slovakia) Ľ Cervanová	1	4
(Venezuela) M Vento-Kabchi	6	6
(Germany) A Barna	4	2
8	(Canada) J Nejedly	6	6

Second round
1	(United States) M Shaughnessy	6	6
(Germany) G Arn	1	3
(United States) A Stevenson	6	6
7	(United States) L Osterloh	4	1
3	(Luxembourg) A Kremer	6	6
(Colombia) C Castaño	4	2
(Venezuela) M Vento-Kabchi	2	1
8	(Canada) J Nejedly	6	6

Quarterfinals
1	(United States) M Shaughnessy	7^{8}	6^{7}	7^{7}
(United States) A Stevenson	6^{6}	7^{9}	6^{4}
3	(Luxembourg) A Kremer	6	6
8	(Canada) J Nejedly	2	3

Semifinals
1	(United States) M Shaughnessy	7^{7}	6
3	(Luxembourg) A Kremer	6^{5}	2

=== Bottom half ===
First round
5	(United States) J Hopkins	6	7^{7}
(Belgium) E Callens	4	6^{2}
Q	(United States) A Spears	5	6	2
(Italy) A Serra Zanetti	7	3	6
(Czech Republic) A Vašková	6^{5}	6	6
(United States) M Irvin	7^{7}	4	4
WC	(Canada) M Marois	5	4
4	(Croatia) I Majoli	7	6
6	(France) N Dechy	6	6
(Canada) R Kolbovic	1	2
Q	(South Africa) N Grandin	6	3	0
(United States) S Reeves	4	6	6
(Slovakia) M Suchá	6	4	6
WC	(Canada) M-È Pelletier	2	6	4

Second round
5	(United States) J Hopkins	6	6
(Italy) A Serra Zanetti	3	2
(Czech Republic) A Vašková	3	2
4	(Croatia) I Majoli	6	6
6	(France) N Dechy	6	1	2
(United States) S Reeves	0	6	6
(Slovakia) M Suchá	3	6	7^{10}
2	(Italy) S Farina Elia	6	4	6^{8}

Quarterfinals
5	(United States) J Hopkins	6	4	4
4	(Croatia) I Majoli	1	6	6
(United States) S Reeves	1	4
(Slovakia) M Suchá	6	6

Semifinals
4	(Croatia) I Majoli	6	7
(Slovakia) M Suchá	4	5
