= 2001 Challenge Bell – Doubles =

Doubles
- 2001 Challenge Bell

Final
- Champions: (United States) Samantha Reeves (Italy) Adriana Serra Zanetti
- Runners-up: (Czech Republic) Klára Koukalová (Czech Republic) Alena Vašková
- Score: 7–5, 4–6, 6–3

Details
- Draw: 16
- Seeds: 4

Events
Singles	Doubles
← 2000 ·	Tournoi de Québec	· 2002 →

Nicole Pratt and Meghann Shaughnessy were the defending champions, but decided not to participate this year.

Samantha Reeves and Adriana Serra Zanetti won the title, defeating Klára Koukalová and Alena Vašková 7–5, 4–6, 6–3 in the final.

== Seeds ==
1. (Argentina) María Emilia Salerni / (Argentina) Patricia Tarabini (withdrew)
2. (Canada) Sonya Jeyaseelan / (United States) Lilia Osterloh (semifinals)
3. (Germany) Anca Barna / (Belgium) Els Callens (first round)
4. (South Africa) Kim Grant / (United States) Abigail Spears (quarterfinals)
5. (Canada) Renata Kolbovic / (Venezuela) María Vento-Kabchi (quarterfinals)

== Draw ==
Key

- Q = Qualifier
- WC = Wild card
- LL = Lucky loser
- Alt = Alternate
- ITF = ITF entry
- PR = Protected ranking
- SR = Special ranking
- SE = Special exempt
- JE = Junior exempt
- JR = Junior Accelerator Programme entrant
- CO = College Accelerator Programme entrant
- NG = Next Gen Accelerator Program entrant
- w/o = Walkover
- r = Retired
- d = Defaulted

First round
5	(Canada) R Kolbovic (Venezuela) M Vento-Kabchi	6	6
(Canada) M Marois (Canada) D Srebrovic	3	1
(United States) J Fiers (Canada) N Loeffler-Caro	0	1
(Czech Republic) K Koukalová (Czech Republic) A Vašková	6	6
4	(South Africa) K Grant (United States) A Spears	6	6
(Germany) G Arn (United States) J Hopkins	2	2
(Canada) K Ionesco (Luxembourg) A Kremer	7^{7}	6
(United States) T Dabek (Germany) N Nittinger	6^{5}	4
(Canada) A Bordeleau (Canada) A Paradis	1	1
WC	(Canada) C Goulet (Canada) B Ko	6	6
(United States) S Reeves (Italy) A Serra Zanetti	6	6
3	(Germany) A Barna (Belgium) E Callens	4	3
(France) N Dechy (Canada) M-È Pelletier	6	6
(Republic of Ireland) K Liggan (Canada) J Nejedly	4	2
(South Africa) N Grandin (United States) E Schmidt	2	1
2	(Canada) S Jeyaseelan (United States) L Osterloh	6	6

Quarterfinals
5	(Canada) R Kolbovic (Venezuela) M Vento-Kabchi	0	3
(Czech Republic) K Koukalová (Czech Republic) A Vašková	6	6
4	(South Africa) K Grant (United States) A Spears	6^{3}	7^{8}	4
(Canada) K Ionesco (Luxembourg) A Kremer	7^{7}	6^{6}	6
WC	(Canada) C Goulet (Canada) B Ko	3	1
(United States) S Reeves (Italy) A Serra Zanetti	6	6
(France) N Dechy (Canada) M-È Pelletier	2	3
2	(Canada) S Jeyaseelan (United States) L Osterloh	6	6

Semifinals
(Czech Republic) K Koukalová (Czech Republic) A Vašková	3	6	7
(Canada) K Ionesco (Luxembourg) A Kremer	6	2	5
(United States) S Reeves (Italy) A Serra Zanetti	6	6
2	(Canada) S Jeyaseelan (United States) L Osterloh	1	3

Final
(Czech Republic) K Koukalová (Czech Republic) A Vašková	5	6	3
(United States) S Reeves (Italy) A Serra Zanetti	7	4	6
