= 2004 Challenge Bell =

- Date: November 1–7
- Edition: 12th
- Category: WTA Tier III
- Draw: 30S (32Q) / 16D (4Q)
- Prize money: US$170,000
- Surface: Carpet – indoors
- Location: Quebec City, Canada
- Venue: Club Avantage Multi-Sports

Champions

Singles
- (Slovakia) Martina Suchá

Doubles
- (United States) Carly Gullickson / (Argentina) María Emilia Salerni
← 2003 ·	Tournoi de Québec	· 2005 →

The 2004 Challenge Bell was a women's tennis tournament played on indoor carpet courts at the Club Avantage Multi-Sports in Quebec City in Canada that was part of Tier III of the 2004 WTA Tour. It was the 12th edition of the Challenge Bell, and was held from November 1 through November 7, 2004. Unseeded Martina Suchá won the singles title.

== Finals ==
=== Singles ===
(Slovakia) Martina Suchá defeated (United States) Abigail Spears, 7–5, 3–6, 6–2

- It was Suchá's only title of the year and the 2nd of her career.

=== Doubles ===
(United States) Carly Gullickson / (Argentina) María Emilia Salerni defeated (Belgium) Els Callens / (Australia) Samantha Stosur, 7–5, 7–5

- It was Gullickson's only title of the year and the 1st of her career. It was Salerni's only title of the year and the 2nd of her career.
