= 2003 Challenge Bell – Doubles =

Doubles
- 2003 Challenge Bell

Final
- Champions: (China) Li Ting (China) Sun Tiantian
- Runners-up: (Belgium) Els Callens (United States) Meilen Tu
- Score: 6–3, 6–3

Details
- Draw: 16
- Seeds: 4

Events
Singles	Doubles
← 2002 ·	Tournoi de Québec	· 2004 →

Samantha Reeves and Jessica Steck were the defending champions, but Steck decided not to participate this year. Reeves partnered with Nana Miyagi, but lost in the semifinals to Els Callens and Meilen Tu.

Li Ting and Sun Tiantian won the title, defeating Callens and Tu 6–3, 6–3 in the final.

== Seeds ==
1. (Belgium) Els Callens / (United States) Meilen Tu (final)
2. (Italy) Rita Grande / (Russia) Alina Jidkova (quarterfinals)
3. (Japan) Nana Miyagi / (United States) Samantha Reeves (semifinals)
4. (China) Li Ting / (China) Sun Tiantian (champions)

== Draw ==
=== Key ===
- Q = Qualifier
- WC = Wild card
- LL = Lucky loser
- Alt = Alternate
- SE = Special exempt
- PR = Protected ranking
- ITF = ITF entry
- JE = Junior exempt
- w/o = Walkover
- r = Retired
- d = Defaulted
- SR = Special ranking

First round
1	(Belgium) E Callens (United States) M Tu	7^{7}	6
(Brazil) M-F Alves (Italy) Ad Serra Zanetti	6^{4}	2
(Venezuela) M Sequera (Italy) An Serra Zanetti	3	7	6^{0}
(United States) J Craybas (Argentina) G Dulko	6	5	7^{7}
3	(Japan) N Miyagi (United States) S Reeves	6	6
(Germany) K Freye (United States) L Granville	2	3
(United States) J Embry (United States) M Washington	6^{4}	6	7^{9}
(United States) A Augustus (Canada) M Marois	7^{7}	4	6^{7}
(United States) A Cargill (South Africa) K Grant	1	4
(France) M Bartoli (Russia) M Sharapova	6	6
(Czech Republic) I Benešová (Czech Republic) L Němečková	1	0
4	(China) T Li (China) T Sun	6	6
WC	(Canada) M-È Pelletier (Canada) D Srebrovic	1	2
(China) Z Yan (China) J Zheng	6	6
Q	(United States) A Baker (United States) S Taylor	2^{r}
2	(Italy) R Grande (Russia) A Jidkova	4

Quarterfinals
1	(Belgium) E Callens (United States) M Tu	7	6
(United States) J Craybas (Argentina) G Dulko	5	2
3	(Japan) N Miyagi (United States) S Reeves	6	4	6
(United States) J Embry (United States) M Washington	3	6	3
(France) M Bartoli (Russia) M Sharapova	3	3
4	(China) T Li (China) T Sun	6	6
(China) Z Yan (China) J Zheng	6	6
2	(Italy) R Grande (Russia) A Jidkova	1	2

Semifinals
1	(Belgium) E Callens (United States) M Tu	6	6
3	(Japan) N Miyagi (United States) S Reeves	3	3
4	(China) T Li (China) T Sun	7^{9}	6
(China) Z Yan (China) J Zheng	6^{7}	2

Final
1	(Belgium) E Callens (United States) M Tu	3	3
4	(China) T Li (China) T Sun	6	6
