= 2003 Challenge Bell =

- Date: October 27 – November 2
- Edition: 11th
- Category: WTA Tier III
- Draw: 30S (32Q) / 16D (4Q)
- Prize money: US$170,000
- Surface: Carpet – indoors
- Location: Quebec City, Canada
- Venue: Club Avantage Multi-Sports

Champions

Singles
- (Russia) Maria Sharapova

Doubles
- (China) Li Ting / (China) Sun Tiantian
← 2002 ·	Tournoi de Québec	· 2004 →

The 2003 Challenge Bell was a women's tennis tournament played on indoor carpet courts at the Club Avantage Multi-Sports in Quebec City in Canada that was part of Tier III of the 2003 WTA Tour. It was the 11th edition of the Challenge Bell, and was held from October 27 through November 2, 2003. Second-seeded Maria Sharapova won the singles title.

== Finals ==
=== Singles ===
(Russia) Maria Sharapova defeated (Venezuela) Milagros Sequera, 6–2, retired

- It was Sharapova's 2nd title of the year and the 2nd of her career.

=== Doubles ===
(China) Li Ting / (China) Sun Tiantian defeated (Belgium) Els Callens / (United States) Meilen Tu, 6–3, 6–3

- It was Li's 2nd title of the year and the 2nd of her career. It was Sun's 2nd title of the year and the 2nd of her career.
