= 2004 Challenge Bell – Singles =

Singles
- 2004 Challenge Bell

Final
- Champion: (Slovakia) Martina Suchá
- Runner-up: (United States) Abigail Spears
- Score: 7–5, 3–6, 6–2

Details
- Draw: 30
- Seeds: 8

Events
Singles	Doubles
← 2003 ·	Tournoi de Québec	· 2005 →

Maria Sharapova was the defending champion, but decided not to participate this year.

Martina Suchá won the title, defeating Abigail Spears 7–5, 3–6, 6–2 in the final.

== Seeds ==
1. (France) Mary Pierce (quarterfinals)
2. (Slovakia) Daniela Hantuchová (second round)
3. (United States) Mashona Washington (first round)
4. (United States) Jill Craybas (second round)
5. (Thailand) Tamarine Tanasugarn (second round)
6. (Luxembourg) Claudine Schaul (second round)
7. (United States) Laura Granville (second round)
8. (Australia) Samantha Stosur (first round)

== Draw ==
=== Key ===
- Q = Qualifier
- WC = Wild card
- LL = Lucky loser
- Alt = Alternate
- ITF = ITF entry
- PR = Protected ranking
- SR = Special ranking
- SE = Special exempt
- JE = Junior exempt
- JR = Junior Accelerator Programme entrant
- CO = College Accelerator Programme entrant
- NG = Next Gen Accelerator Program entrant
- w/o = Walkover
- r = Retired
- d = Defaulted

=== Finals ===
Semifinals
(Russia) Alina Jidkova	6^{4}	6	6^{4}
Q	(United States) Abigail Spears	7^{7}	4	7^{7}
(Slovakia) Martina Suchá	7^{7}	5	7^{8}
(Argentina) María Emilia Salerni	6^{3}	7	6^{6}

Final
Q	(United States) Abigail Spears	5	6	2
(Slovakia) Martina Suchá	7	3	6

=== Top half ===
First round
(Argentina) M Díaz Oliva	6	6
Q	(Russia) E Vesnina	3	2
(Israel) T Obziler	1	2
(Canada) S Dubois	6	6
(Russia) A Jidkova	7^{7}	6
8	(Australia) S Stosur	6^{2}	3
4	(United States) J Craybas	6^{2}	6	7^{7}
(United States) M Irvin	7^{7}	2	6^{2}
(United States) L Lee-Waters	5	3
Q	(United States) A Spears	7	6
(Slovakia) Ľ Kurhajcová	7^{7}	5	6
(Hungary) A Kapros	6^{2}	7	3
(Czech Republic) S Kleinová	3	2
5	(Thailand) T Tanasugarn	6	6

Second round
1	(France) M Pierce	6	6
(Argentina) M Díaz Oliva	3	4
(Canada) S Dubois	6	6^{6}	6^{5}
(Russia) A Jidkova	3	7^{8}	7^{7}
4	(United States) J Craybas	1	2
Q	(United States) A Spears	6	6
(Slovakia) Ľ Kurhajcová	7	7
5	(Thailand) T Tanasugarn	5	5

Quarterfinals
1	(France) M Pierce	4	6^{8}
(Russia) A Jidkova	6	7^{10}
Q	(United States) A Spears	6	7^{7}
(Slovakia) Ľ Kurhajcová	4	6^{4}

Semifinals
(Russia) A Jidkova	6^{4}	6	6^{4}
Q	(United States) A Spears	7^{7}	4	7^{7}

=== Bottom half ===
First round
6	(Luxembourg) C Schaul	6	7^{8}
(Germany) A Barna	2	6^{6}
WC	(Canada) M Marois	0	5
(Slovakia) M Suchá	6	7
WC	(Canada) M-È Pelletier	1	4
(United States) S Perry	6	6
Q	(Bulgaria) S Karatantcheva	6	6
3	(United States) M Washington	0	2
7	(United States) L Granville	6	6
(France) C Pin	1	1
(Argentina) ME Salerni	6	7^{7}
(United States) J Hopkins	2	6^{3}
(France) S Foretz	4	7^{7}	6^{2}
Q	(Canada) M Gloria	6	6^{5}	7^{7}

Second round
6	(Luxembourg) C Schaul	3	0
(Slovakia) M Suchá	6	6
(United States) S Perry	2	3
Q	(Bulgaria) S Karatantcheva	6	6
7	(United States) L Granville	6^{0}	5
(Argentina) ME Salerni	7^{7}	7
Q	(Canada) M Gloria	6	2	6
2	(Slovakia) D Hantuchová	3	6	1

Quarterfinals
(Slovakia) M Suchá	6	4	6
Q	(Bulgaria) S Karatantcheva	1	6	4
(Argentina) ME Salerni	6	6
Q	(Canada) M Gloria	4	0

Semifinals
(Slovakia) M Suchá	7^{7}	5	7^{8}
(Argentina) ME Salerni	6^{3}	7	6^{6}
