= 2001 Challenge Bell =

- Date: September 17–23
- Edition: 9th
- Category: WTA Tier III
- Draw: 30S (24Q) / 16D (0Q)
- Prize money: US$170,000
- Surface: Carpet – indoors
- Location: Quebec City, Canada
- Venue: Club Avantage Multi-Sports

Champions

Singles
- (United States) Meghann Shaughnessy

Doubles
- (United States) Samantha Reeves / (Italy) Adriana Serra Zanetti
← 2000 ·	Tournoi de Québec	· 2002 →

The 2001 Challenge Bell was a women's tennis tournament played on indoor carpet courts at the Club Avantage Multi-Sports in Quebec City in Canada that was part of Tier III of the 2001 WTA Tour. It was the 9th edition of the Challenge Bell, and was held from September 17 through September 23, 2001. First-seeded Meghann Shaughnessy won the singles title.

== Finals ==
=== Singles ===
(United States) Meghann Shaughnessy defeated (Croatia) Iva Majoli, 6–1, 6–3

- It was Shaughnessy's only title of the year and the 2nd of her career.

=== Doubles ===
(United States) Samantha Reeves / (Italy) Adriana Serra Zanetti defeated (Czech Republic) Klára Koukalová / (Czech Republic) Alena Vašková, 7–5, 4–6, 6–3

- It was Reeves' only title of the year and the 1st of her career. It was Zanetti's only title of the year and the 1st of her career.
