= Kelley Hyndman =

American tennis player

- Country (sports): United States
- Born: September 22, 1985 (age 40); Plymouth, Massachusetts
- Height: 5 ft 9 in (175 cm)
- Plays: Right-handed
- Prize money: $12,888

Singles
- Career record: 22–48
- Highest ranking: No. 570 (Jun 23, 2003)

Doubles
- Career titles: 1 ITF
- Highest ranking: No. 689 (Sep 08, 2003)

Kelley Hyndman (born September 22, 1985) is an American former professional tennis player.

Hyndman was born in Massachusetts and is the daughter of Canadian Mike Hyndman, who played professional ice hockey in the World Hockey Association. Her younger sister Yvette was also a world ranked tennis player.

In 1999 at the age of 14, Hydnman was a singles finalist at the Eddie Herr International Championships for the 16s age group, while securing titles in both the girls' doubles and mixed doubles events.

Hyndman competed in collegiate tennis for the University of Georgia, alongside her sister Yvette. She was named the team's MVP when they captured the SEC championship title in 2008, winning all of her matches.

As a professional player she had a best singles world rankings of 570. She made a WTA Tour main draw appearance in doubles at the 2002 Challenge Bell and won a $25,000 ITF doubles title in Hammond, Louisiana in 2005.

== ITF Circuit finals ==
=== Doubles: 1 (1–0) ===
Outcome	Date	Tournament	Tier	Surface	Partner	Opponents	Score
Winner	Jul 2005	ITF Hammond, United States	25K	Hard	(United States) Mary Gambale	(United States) Christina Fusano (United States) Ahsha Rolle	2–6, 6–3, 7–5
