= Mélanie Gloria =

Canadian tennis player

- Country (sports): Canada
- Residence: Montreal, Quebec
- Born: June 19, 1987 (age 38) Montreal
- Turned pro: 2006
- Retired: 2010
- Plays: Right (two-handed backhand)
- Prize money: US$ 32,327

Singles
- Career record: 63–33
- Career titles: 5 ITF
- Highest ranking: No. 287 (September 12, 2005)

Doubles
- Career record: 38–18
- Career titles: 6 ITF
- Highest ranking: No. 578 (September 29, 2003)

Mélanie Gloria (born June 19, 1987) is a Canadian former professional tennis player.

Gloria won five singles and six doubles titles on the ITF Women's Circuit. On 12 September 2005, she reached her best singles ranking of world No. 287. On 29 September 2003, she peaked at No. 578 in the doubles rankings.

In 2004 at the Challenge Bell, she upset the second seed Daniela Hantuchová in the second round. She lost in the quarterfinals to María Emilia Salerni.

== Personal life ==
Gloria is of Portuguese descent. Her parents Helena and Jorge were born in Peniche and some members of her family still live there.

== ITF Circuit finals ==
Legend
$25,000 tournaments
$10,000 tournaments

=== Singles: 8 (5 titles, 3 runner-ups) ===
Result	W–L	Date	Tournament	Tier	Surface	Opponent	Score
Loss	0–1	Aug 2005	Vancouver Open, Canada	25,000	Hard	(United States) Ansley Cargill	4–6, 2–6
Loss	0–2	Jun 2007	ITF Amarante, Portugal	10,000	Hard	(Italy) Elisa Balsamo	3–6, 5–7
Win	1–2	Jun 2007	ITF Alcobaça, Portugal	10,000	Hard	(Switzerland) Stefania Boffa	6–3, 6–3
Win	2–2	Jun 2008	ITF Amarante, Portugal	10,000	Hard	(Spain) Yera Campos-Molina	6–2, 6–3
Win	3–2	Jun 2008	ITF Montemor-o-Novo, Portugal	10,000	Hard	(Portugal) Maria João Koehler	6–7^{(2)}, 6–3, 6–1
Loss	3–3	Jun 2009	ITF Amarante, Portugal	10,000	Hard	(Portugal) Maria João Koehler	3–6, 2–6
Win	4–3	Jun 2009	ITF Montemor-o-Novo, Portugal	10,000	Hard	(Spain) Yera Campos-Molina	6–1, 6–2
Win	5–3	Jun 2010	ITF Amarante, Portugal	10,000	Hard	(Australia) Shayna McDowell	7–5, 6–7^{(6)}, 6–0

=== Doubles: 7 (6 titles, 1 runner-up) ===
Result	W–L	Date	Tournament	Tier	Surface	Partner	Opponents	Score
Win	1–0	Jun 2007	ITF Alcobaça, Portugal	10,000	Hard	(United States) Kady Pooler	(Israel) Keren Shlomo (Portugal) Joana Pangaio Pereira	6–1, 6–4
Win	2–0	Jun 2008	ITF Amarante, Portugal	10,000	Hard	(Spain) Lucía Sainz	(Argentina) Tatiana Búa (Colombia) Karen Castiblanco	7–6^{(3)}, 6–4
Win	3–0	Jun 2008	ITF Montemor-o-Novo, Portugal	10,000	Hard	(Spain) Lucía Sainz	(Argentina) Carla Beltrami (Argentina) Vanesa Furlanetto	6–1, 6–1
Win	4–0	Jun 2009	ITF Montemor-o-Novo, Portugal	10,000	Hard	(Mexico) Daniela Múñoz Gallegos	(Australia) Lucia Gonzalez (Australia) Renee Lampret	7–5, 7–6^{(5)}
Win	5–0	Jun 2010	ITF Amarante, Portugal	10,000	Hard	(Mexico) Daniela Múñoz Gallegos	(Portugal) Magali de Lattre (Australia) Jade Hopper	6–4, 6–2
Win	6–0	Jun 2010	ITF Montemor-o-Novo, Portugal	10,000	Hard	(Mexico) Daniela Múñoz Gallegos	(Germany) Kim Grajdek (Bulgaria) Julia Stamatova	7–6^{(3)}, 6–1
Loss	6–1	Jun 2010	ITF Alcobaça, Portugal	10,000	Hard	(Mexico) Daniela Múñoz Gallegos	(United Kingdom) Anna Fitzpatrick (United Kingdom) Jade Windley	2–6, 1–6
