= Maureen Drake =

Canadian tennis player (born 1971)

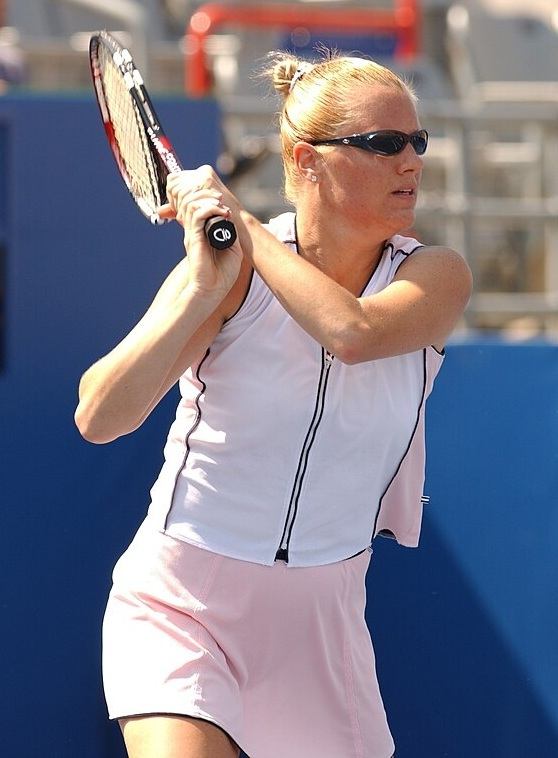
- Drake at the 2002 Rogers AT&T Cup
- Country (sports): Canada
- Residence: Toronto, Ontario
- Born: March 21, 1971 (age 55) Toronto, Ontario
- Height: 1.75 m (5 ft 9 in)
- Turned pro: 1991
- Retired: 2016
- Plays: Right-handed (two-handed backhand)
- Prize money: $795,194

Singles
- Career record: 449–384
- Career titles: 6 ITF
- Highest ranking: No. 47 (September 13, 1999)

Grand Slam singles results
- Australian Open: 4R (1999)
- French Open: 1R (1999, 2000)
- Wimbledon: 3R (2002)
- US Open: 1R (1990, 1999, 2003, 2004)

Doubles
- Career record: 153–182
- Career titles: 8 ITF
- Highest ranking: No. 77 (October 30, 2006)

Grand Slam doubles results
- Australian Open: 2R (2005)
- French Open: 2R (1999)
- Wimbledon: 2R (1998, 2006)
- US Open: 1R (1998, 1999)

Maureen Elizabeth Drake (born March 21, 1971) is a Canadian former professional tennis player.

Her career-high WTA singles ranking is No. 47, which she reached on September 13, 1999. Her career-high doubles ranking is No. 77, set on October 30, 2006.

After Drake qualified for the round of 16 at the 1999 Australian Open, there was no Canadian to reach the fourth round of a Grand Slam event until Aleksandra Wozniak at the French Open in 2009.

Drake retired in April 2011 but returned to professional tennis in July 2014. In August 2016, she announced her second and permanent retirement from professional tennis.

Drake is of Slovenian descent through her father.

== WTA career finals ==
=== Doubles: 1 runner-up ===
Legend
Grand Slam tournaments
Tier I (0–0)
Tier II (0–0)
Tier III, IV & V (0–1)

Result	Date	Tournament	Tier	Surface	Partner	Opponents	Score
Loss	Sep 1997	Bali International, Indonesia	Tier IV	Hard	(Canada) Renata Kolbovic	(Australia) Kerry-Anne Guse (Japan) Rika Hiraki	1–6, 6–7^{(5–7)}

== ITF Circuit finals ==
=== Singles: 18 (6 titles, 12 runner-ups) ===
Legend
$75,000 tournaments (0–1)
$50,000 tournaments (0–3)
$25,000 tournaments (5–7)
$10,000 tournaments (1–1)

Result	W–L	Date	Tournament	Tier	Surface	Opponent	Score
Loss	0–1	Jul 1990	Evansville, United States	25k	Hard	(United States) Halle Carroll	3–6, 4–6
Loss	0–2	Sep 1992	Salisbury, United States	25k	Hard	(United States) Beverly Bowes	3–6, 2–6
Loss	0–3	Oct 1992	Potosí, Mexico	25k	Hard	(Mexico) Angélica Gavaldón	1–6, 4–6
Win	1–3	Feb 1993	Miami, United States	25k	Hard	(United States) Beverly Bowes	4–6, 7–5, 6–1
Loss	1–4	Jun 1993	Hilton Head, United States	10k	Hard	(United States) Halle Carroll	7–6^{(3)}, 2–6, 6–7^{(3)}
Loss	1–5	Feb 1994	Miami, United States	25k	Hard	(United States) Elly Hakami	5–7, 3–6
Win	2–5	Jun 1994	Columbia, United States	10k	Hard	(United States) Anne Miller	6–3, 6–3
Loss	2–6	Jun 1995	Peachtree, United States	25k	Hard	(United States) Anne Miller	3–6, 2–6
Win	3–6	Jul 1995	Mississauga, Canada	25k	Hard	(United States) Kori Davidson	6–4, 6–0
Loss	3–7	Jul 1997	Clearwater, United States	25k	Hard	(United States) Karin Miller	3–6, 6–7^{(6)}
Win	4–7	Apr 1998	Industry Hills, United States	25k	Hard	(United States) Lilia Osterloh	6–4, 6–4
Win	5–7	Nov 1998	Caracas, Venezuela	25k	Hard	(Brazil) Vanessa Menga	6–1, 6–2
Loss	5–8	Feb 2002	Columbus, United States	25k	Hard (i)	(France) Marion Bartoli	2–6, 3–6
Win	6–8	Mar 2002	Lawrenceville, United States	25k	Hard	(United States) Teryn Ashley	6–3, 6–4
Loss	6–9	Apr 2002	Naples, United States	50k	Clay	(Russia) Vera Zvonareva	1–6, 3–6
Loss	6–10	Jul 2004	Los Gatos, United States	50k	Hard	(Russia) Lioudmila Skavronskaia	6–7^{(0)}, 4–6
Loss	6–11	Jul 2004	Schenectady, United States	50k	Hard	(United States) Bethanie Mattek-Sands	3–6, 1–6
Loss	6–12	Sep 2005	Albuquerque Championships, U.S.	75k	Hard	(Russia) Anastasia Rodionova	2–6, 3–6

=== Doubles: 20 (8 titles, 12 runner-ups) ===
Legend
$75,000 tournaments (1–2)
$50,000 tournaments (2–2)
$25,000 tournaments (4–8)
$10,000 tournaments (1–0)

Result	W–L	Date	Tournament	Tier	Surface	Partner	Opponents	Score
Win	1–0	Feb 1994	Miami, United States	25k	Hard	(United States) Audra Keller	(United States) Beverly Bowes (Poland) Katharzyna Teodorowicz	4–6, 6–4, 6–4
Loss	1–1	Jul 1994	Evansville, United States	25k	Hard	(Canada) Mélanie Bernard	(United States) Michelle Jackson-Nobrega (United States) Shannan McCarthy	6–4, 6–7^{(4)}, 3–6
Loss	1–2	Oct 1994	Rancho Mirage, United States	25k	Hard	(United States) Audra Keller	(United States) Cammy MacGregor (United States) Stephanie Reece	6–0, 5–7, 4–6
Loss	1–3	Jul 1996	Wilmington, United States	50k	Hard	(United States) Meilen Tu	(United States) Erika deLone (Australia) Nicole Pratt	5–7, 6–7^{(2)}
Loss	1–4	Jul 1997	Clearwater, United States	25k	Hard	(United States) Lindsay Lee-Waters	(United Kingdom) Julie Pullin (United Kingdom) Amanda Wainwright	4–6, 4–6
Win	2–4	Jan 1998	Delray Beach, United States	10k	Hard	(Canada) Renata Kolbovic	(United States) Jean Okada (United States) Keri Phebus	7–6^{(3)}, 6–4
Win	3–4	Feb 1998	Clearwater, United States	25k	Hard	(Canada) Renata Kolbovic	(Puerto Rico) Kristina Brandi (United States) Karin Miller	4–6, 6–3, 6–4
Loss	3–5	May 1998	Midlothian, United States	25k	Clay	(Canada) Renata Kolbovic	(Australia) Trudi Musgrave (United States) Brie Rippner	3–6, 3–6
Loss	3–6	May 1998	Haines City, United States	25k	Clay	(Canada) Renata Kolbovic	(South Africa) Esme De Villiers (South Africa) Jessica Steck	3–6, 2–6
Loss	3–7	Oct 1998	Santa Clara, United States	75k	Hard	(United States) Lindsay Lee-Waters	(Zimbabwe) Cara Black (Kazakhstan) Irina Selyutina	4–6, 7–5, 3–6
Win	4–7	Nov 1998	Austin, United States	50k	Hard	(United States) Lindsay Lee-Waters	(South Africa) Esme De Villiers (South Africa) Liezel Horn	6–1, 6–1
Loss	4–8	Nov 1998	Caracas, Venezuela	25k	Hard	(Germany) Caroline Schneider	(Brazil) Vanessa Menga (Spain) Alicia Ortuño	3–6, 7–5, 3–6
Loss	4–9	May 2001	Midlothian, United States	25k	Clay	(Canada) Diana Srebrovic	(United States) Jennifer Russell (United States) Abigail Spears	6–7^{(2)}, 6–1, 2–6
Loss	4–10	Sep 2003	Raleigh, United States	25k	Clay	(Romania) Edina Gallovits-Hall	(Brazil) Maria Fernanda Alves (United States) Tiffany Dabek	6–2, 3–6, 1–6
Win	5–10	Oct 2003	Lafayette, United States	25k	Clay	(United States) Lindsay Lee-Waters	(Mexico) Jessica Fernández (United States) Kara Molony-Hussey	6–2, 6–3
Win	6–10	Sep 2004	Albuquerque, United States	75k	Hard	(United States) Carly Gullickson	(Canada) Stéphanie Dubois (Argentina) María Emilia Salerni	6–3, 7–6^{(6)}
Loss	6–11	Oct 2004	Cary, United States	50k	Clay	(Japan) Nana Smith	(Romania) Ruxandra Dragomir (United States) Samantha Reeves	6–4, 3–6, 3–6
Win	7–11	Jan 2006	Fort Walton Beach, United States	25k	Hard	(Czech Republic) Vladimíra Uhlířová	(Slovakia) Zuzana Kučová (South Africa) Chanelle Scheepers	2–6, 6–4, 7–5
Loss	7–12	Feb 2007	Midland Classic, United States	75k	Hard (i)	(Canada) Stéphanie Dubois	(United States) Laura Granville (United States) Abigail Spears	4–6, 6–3, 3–6
Win	8–12	Nov 2009	Toronto Challenger, Canada	50k	Hard (i)	(Canada) Marianne Jodoin	(Canada) Sharon Fichman (United States) Mashona Washington	2–3 ret.

== Grand Slam performance timelines ==
Key
W	F	SF	QF	#R	RR	Q#	DNQ	A	NH

(W) winner; (F) finalist; (SF) semifinalist; (QF) quarterfinalist; (#R) rounds 4, 3, 2, 1; (RR) round-robin stage; (Q#) qualification round; (DNQ) did not qualify; (A) absent; (NH) not held; (SR) strike rate (events won / competed); (W–L) win–loss record.

=== Singles ===
Tournament	1988	1989	1990	1991	1992	1993	1994	1995	1996	1997	1998	1999	2000	2001	2002	2003	2004	2005	W–L	Win %
Australian Open	A	A	1R	A	1R	Q2	Q1	A	A	A	A	4R	1R	A	Q1	1R	1R	Q1	3–6	33%
French Open	Q1	A	A	Q3	Q2	A	A	Q1	Q1	A	Q1	1R	1R	Q2	Q2	Q1	Q1	Q1	0–2	0%
Wimbledon	A	A	A	A	A	A	A	A	1R	Q2	Q2	2R	1R	2R	3R	2R	Q2	Q1	5–6	45%
US Open	A	A	1R	Q1	Q1	Q1	Q1	Q1	Q3	Q2	Q1	1R	Q1	Q1	Q2	1R	1R	Q1	0–4	0%
Win–loss	0–0	0–0	0–2	0–0	0–1	0–0	0–0	0–0	0–1	0–0	0–0	4–4	0–3	1–1	2–1	1–3	0–2	0–0	8–18	31%

=== Doubles ===
Tournament	1994	1995	1996	1997	1998	1999	2000	2001	2002	2003	2004	2005	2006	W–L	Win %
Australian Open	1R	A	A	A	A	1R	A	A	A	A	A	2R	A	1–3	25%
French Open	A	A	A	A	A	2R	A	A	A	A	A	A	1R	1–2	33%
Wimbledon	A	A	A	A	2R	1R	A	A	A	A	Q1	Q1	2R	2–3	40%
US Open	A	A	A	A	1R	1R	A	A	A	A	A	A	A	0–2	0%
Win–loss	0–1	0–0	0–0	0–0	1–2	1–4	0–0	0–0	0–0	0–0	0–0	1–1	1–2	4–10	29%

== Record against top-50 players ==
Drake's win–loss record (14–54, 21%) against players who were ranked world No. 50 or higher when played is as follows:
Players who have been ranked world No. 1 are in boldface.

- (Luxembourg) Anne Kremer 4–1 (Note: 6–1 overall record vs. Kremer)
- (Switzerland) Patty Schnyder 1–0
- (United States) Gigi Fernández 1–0
- (Australia) Anne Minter 1–0
- (Germany) Barbara Rittner 1–0 (Note: 1–2 overall record vs. Rittner)
- (Puerto Rico) Kristina Brandi 1–0 (Note: 3–1 overall record vs. Brandi)
- (Austria) Sylvia Plischke 1–0
- (Zimbabwe) Cara Black 1–0 (Note: 1–2 overall record vs. Black)
- (Switzerland) Marie-Gaïané Mikaelian 1–0 (Note: 2–1 overall record vs. Mikaelian)
- (Chinese Taipei) Cho Yoon-jeong 1–0 (Note: 2–1 overall record vs. Cho)
- (Thailand) Tamarine Tanasugarn 1–1 (Note: 2–2 overall record vs. Tanasugarn)
- **(Belgium) Kim Clijsters** 0–1
- **(United States) Lindsay Davenport** 0–1 (Note: 0–2 overall record vs. Davenport)
- **(Switzerland) Martina Hingis** 0–1
- **(France) Amélie Mauresmo** 0–1
- **(United States) Venus Williams** 0–1
- (France) Nathalie Tauziat 0–1
- (United States) Mary Joe Fernández 0–1
- (Japan) Ai Sugiyama 0–1 (Note: 0–2 overall record vs. Sugiyama)
- (France) Julie Halard-Decugis 0–1
- (Netherlands) Brenda Schultz-McCarthy 0–1
- (Greece) Eleni Daniilidou 0–1
- (United States) Kimberly Po 0–1
- (Japan) Naoko Sawamatsu 0–1
- (Croatia) Karolina Šprem 0–1
- (United States) Patty Fendick 0–1
- (Spain) Magüi Serna 0–1 (Note: 0–2 overall record vs. Serna)
- (Ukraine) Natalia Medvedeva 0–1 (Note: 0–3 overall record vs. Medvedeva)
- (Australia) Nicole Bradtke 0–1 (Note: 0–2 overall record vs. Bradtke)
- (Japan) Mana Endo 0–1
- (South Africa) Mariaan de Swardt 0–1 (Note: 1–5 overall record vs. de Swardt)
- (Spain) Virginia Ruano Pascual 0–1 (Note: 1–3 overall record vs. Ruano Pascual)
- (United States) Ann Grossman 0–1
- (United States) Ginger Helgeson-Nielsen 0–1 (Note: 0–2 overall record vs. Helgeson-Nielsen)
- (United States) Lindsay Lee-Waters 0–1 (Note: 0–3 overall record vs. Lee-Waters)
- (United States) Meilen Tu 0–1 (Note: 1–5 overall record vs. Tu)
- (United States) Carrie Cunningham 0–1
- (Ukraine) Elena Tatarkova 0–1 (Note: 0–3 overall record vs. Tatarkova)
- (Germany) Anca Barna 0–1 (Note: 0–2 overall record vs. Barna)
- (Germany) **Steffi Graf** 0–2
- (Romania) Irina Spîrlea 0–2
- (Italy) Silvia Farina Elia 0–2
- (Russia) Elena Likhovtseva 0–2
- (Russia) Tatiana Panova 0–2
- (Slovenia) Katarina Srebotnik 0–2 (Note: 1–2 overall record vs. Srebotnik)
- (Argentina) Clarisa Fernández 0–2 (Note: 1–3 overall record vs. Fernández)
- (United States) Chanda Rubin 0–3 (Note: 0–4 overall record vs. Rubin)
- (Belgium) Dominique Monami 0–3
- (South Africa) Amanda Coetzer 0–4
