= Carly Gullickson =

American tennis player (born 1986)

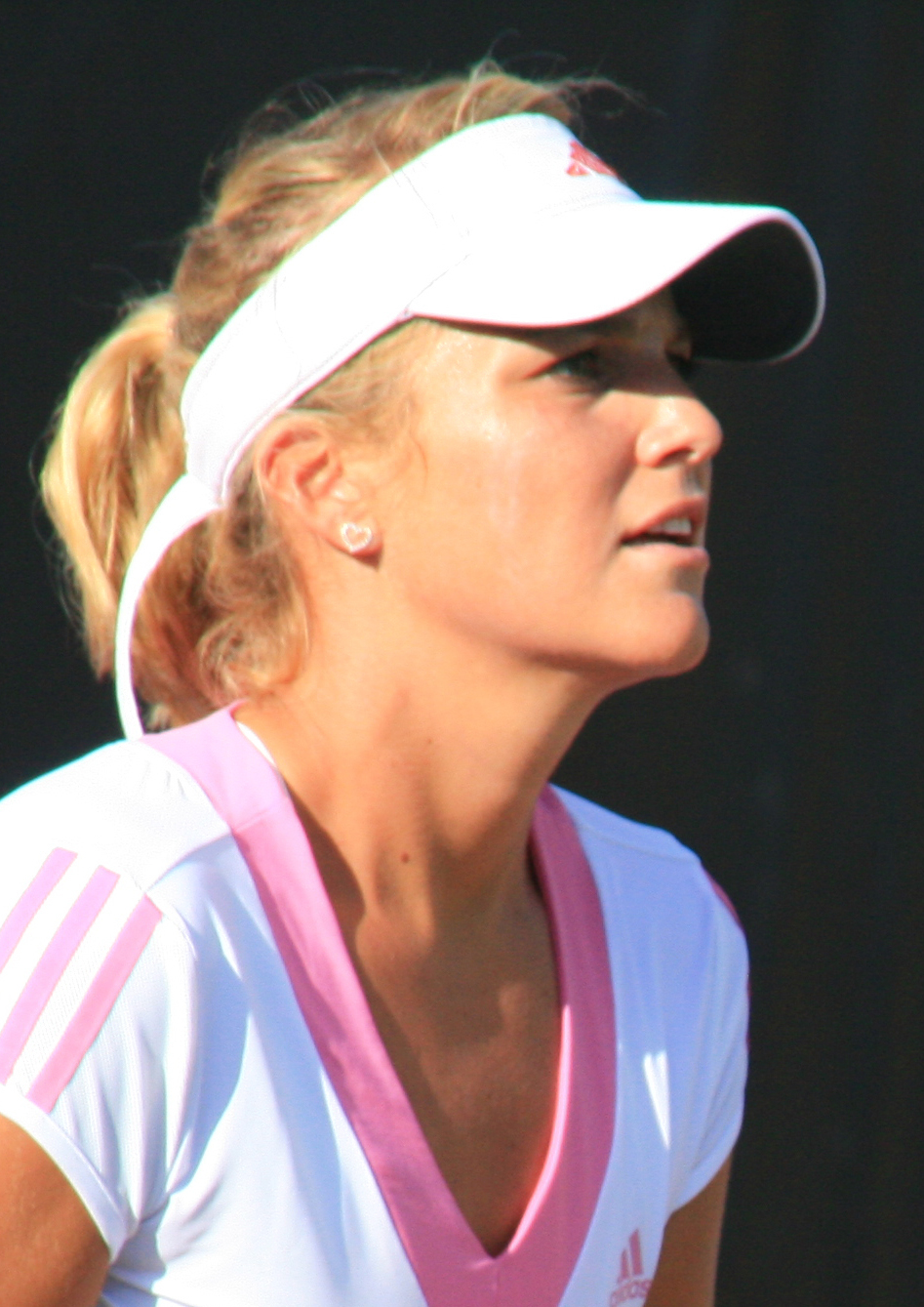
- Country (sports): United States
- Residence: Palm Beach Gardens, Florida, U.S.
- Born: November 26, 1986 (age 39) Cincinnati, Ohio, U.S.
- Height: 5 ft 10 in (178 cm)
- Turned pro: 2003
- Retired: 2013
- Plays: Right-handed (two-handed backhand)
- Prize money: US$ 537,215

Singles
- Career record: 186–146
- Career titles: 2 ITF
- Highest ranking: No. 123 (July 20, 2009)

Grand Slam singles results
- Australian Open: Q2 (2009)
- French Open: 1R (2009)
- Wimbledon: 1R (2003)
- US Open: 1R (2003, 2005, 2009)

Doubles
- Career record: 159–98
- Career titles: 2 WTA, 18 ITF
- Highest ranking: No. 52 (April 3, 2006)

Grand Slam doubles results
- Australian Open: 2R (2010)
- French Open: 2R (2009)
- Wimbledon: 2R (2006, 2008)
- US Open: 3R (2008, 2009)

Mixed doubles
- Career record: 5–1
- Career titles: 1

Grand Slam mixed doubles results
- Australian Open: 1R (2010)
- US Open: W (2009)

Carly Gullickson (born November 26, 1986) is an American former professional tennis player.

Her best singles ranking is No. 123, which she reached in July 2009. Her career-high doubles ranking is No. 52, achieved in April 2006 at age 19.

She is the daughter of former Major League baseball player Bill Gullickson and the older sister of former tennis player Chelsey Gullickson.

Carly won the 2009 US Open mixed-doubles event, partnering with Travis Parrott.

Gullickson retired from tennis in 2013 and began her coaching profession at Frenchman's Reserve Country Club in Palm Beach Gardens, FL.

== Grand Slam finals ==
=== Mixed doubles: 1 (1 title) ===
Result	Year	Championship	Surface	Partner	Opponents	Score
Win	2009	US Open	Hard	(United States) Travis Parrott	(Zimbabwe) Cara Black (India) Leander Paes	6–2, 6–4

== WTA career finals ==
=== Doubles: 3 (2 titles, 1 runner-up) ===
Before 2009	Starting in 2009
Grand Slam tournaments (0)
Tier I (0/0)	Premier Mandatory (0/0)
Tier II (0/0)	Premier 5 (0/0)
Tier III (2/0)	Premier (0/0)
Tier IV & V (0/0)	International (0/1)

Result	Date	Tournament	Surface	Partner	Opponents	Score
Win	Nov 2004	Tournoi de Québec, Canada	Carpet (i)	(Argentina) María Emilia Salerni	(Belgium) Els Callens (Australia) Samantha Stosur	7–5, 7–5
Win	Nov 2006	Tournoi de Québec, Canada	Carpet (i)	(United States) Laura Granville	(United States) Jill Craybas (Russia) Alina Jidkova	6–3, 6–4
Loss	Sep 2009	Korea Open, South Korea	Hard	(Australia) Nicole Kriz	(Chinese Taipei) Chan Yung-jan (United States) Abigail Spears	3–6, 4–6

== ITF finals ==
$100,000 tournaments
$75,000 tournaments
$50,000 tournaments
$25,000 tournaments
$10,000 tournaments

=== Singles: 10 (2–8) ===
Result	No.	Date	Tournament	Surface	Opponent	Score
Loss	1.	21 June 2004	ITF Alkmaar, Netherlands	Carpet	(Poland) Marta Leśniak	2–6, 3–6
Win	1.	10 May 2005	ITF Charlottesville, U.S.	Clay	(United States) Varvara Lepchenko	6–4, 6–4
Loss	2.	4 July 2005	ITF Los Gatos, U.S.	Hard	(United States) Lindsay Lee-Waters	4–6, 0–6
Loss	3.	13 June 2006	ITF Allentown, U.S.	Hard	(United States) Varvara Lepchenko	1–6, 4–6
Loss	4.	7 November 2006	ITF Toronto, Canada	Carpet (i)	(Romania) Raluca Olaru	3–6, 1–6
Win	2.	24 March 2008	ITF Hammond, U.S.	Hard	(Georgia (country)) Margalita Chakhnashvili	6–4, 4–6, 6–4
Loss	5.	21 July 2008	ITF Lexington, U.S.	Hard	(United States) Melanie Oudin	4–6, 2–6
Loss	6.	23 September 2008	ITF Ashland, U.S.	Hard	Varvara Lepchenko	7–5, 0–6, 2–6
Loss	7.	20 April 2009	ITF Dothan, U.S.	Clay	Shenay Perry	6–4, 1–6, 3–6
Loss	8.	31 May 2010	ITF Nottingham, UK	Grass	Elena Baltacha	2–6, 2–6

=== Doubles: 24 (18–6) ===
Result	No.	Date	Tournament	Surface	Partner	Opponents	Score
Win	1.	26 September 2004	ITF Albuquerque, U.S.	Hard	(Canada) Maureen Drake	(Canada) Stéphanie Dubois (Argentina) María Emilia Salerni	6–3, 7–6^{(6)}
Win	2.	15 March 2005	ITF Orange, U.S.	Hard	(United States) Jennifer Hopkins	(New Zealand) Leanne Baker (Italy) Francesca Lubiani	6–3, 6–4
Win	3.	19 April 2005	ITF Dothan, U.S.	Clay	(Kazakhstan) Galina Voskoboeva	(United States) Julie Ditty (Czech Republic) Vladimíra Uhlířová	4–6, 6–1, 6–2
Win	4.	3 July 2005	ITF Los Gatos, U.S.	Hard	(United States) Teryn Ashley	(United States) Lindsay Lee-Waters (United States) Kaysie Smashey	6–4, 4–6, 6–1
Win	5.	13 November 2005	ITF Pittsburgh, U.S.	Hard	(United States) Teryn Ashley	(United States) Ashley Harkleroad (United States) Bethanie Mattek	6–1, 6–0
Win	6.	18 June 2006	ITF Allentown, U.S.	Hard	(United States) Tetiana Luzhanska	(United States) Julie Ditty (United States) Ansley Cargill	6–3, 6–4
Win	7.	10 October 2006	ITF San Francisco, U.S.	Hard	(United States) Laura Granville	(United States) Christina Fusano (United States) Aleke Tsoubanos	6–3, 6–1
Loss	1.	22 October 2006	ITF Houston, U.S.	Hard	(United States) Laura Granville	(United States) Julie Ditty (United States) Tetiana Luzhanska	4–6, 6–4, 5–7
Win	8.	7 April 2007	ITF Pelham, U.S.	Clay	(Australia) Nicole Kriz	(Czech Republic) Michaela Paštiková (Czech Republic) Hana Šromová	6–2, 2–6, 6–0
Loss	2.	8 May 2007	ITF Indian Harbour Beach, U.S.	Clay	(United States) Lindsay Lee-Waters	(Australia) Monique Adamczak (United States) Angela Haynes	1–6, 6–3, 4–6
Win	9.	14 January 2008	ITF Surprise, U.S.	Hard	(United States) Shenay Perry	(Brazil) Maria Fernanda Alves (Argentina) Betina Jozami	6–4, 7–5
Win	10.	28 January 2008	ITF La Quinta, U.S.	Hard	(United States) Shenay Perry	(Germany) Angelika Bachmann (United States) Tetiana Luzhanska	6–1, 6–4
Loss	3.	24 March 2008	ITF Hammond, U.S.	Hard	(United States) Chelsey Gullickson	(United States) Raquel Kops-Jones (United States) Abigail Spears	5–7, 4–6
Win	11.	13 July 2008	ITF Allentown, U.S.	Hard	(Australia) Nicole Kriz	(Chinese Taipei) Chan Chin-wei (South Africa) Natalie Grandin	6–2, 6–3
Win	12.	2 August 2008	Vancouver Open, Canada	Hard	(Australia) Nicole Kriz	(United States) Christina Fusano (Japan) Junri Namigata	6–7^{(4)}, 6–1, [10–5]
Win	13.	21 September 2008	ITF Albuquerque, U.S.	Hard	(United States) Julie Ditty	(Argentina) Jorgelina Cravero (Argentina) Betina Jozami	6–3, 6–4
Loss	4.	28 September 2008	ITF Ashland, U.S.	Hard	(United States) Julie Ditty	(Latvia) Līga Dekmeijere (Croatia) Jelena Pandžić	3–6, 6–3, [8–10]
Win	14.	19 October 2008	ITF Lawrenceville, U.S.	Hard	(United States) Julie Ditty	(Indonesia) Yayuk Basuki (Indonesia) Romana Tedjakusuma	3–6, 6–4, [12–10]
Win	15.	26 April 2009	ITF Dothan, U.S.	Hard	(United States) Julie Ditty	(Russia) Ekaterina Bychkova (Russia) Alexandra Panova	2–6, 6–1, [10–6]
Win	16.	3 May 2009	ITF Charlottesville, U.S.	Clay	(Australia) Nicole Kriz	(United States) Angela Haynes (Russia) Alina Jidkova	7–5, 3–6, [10–7]
Win	17.	3 October 2009	ITF Hamanako, Japan	Carpet	(Australia) Nicole Kriz	(Indonesia) Yayuk Basuki (Chinese Taipei) Hwang I-hsuan	4–6, 7–6^{(2)}, [10–5]
Win	18.	26 April 2010	ITF Charlottesville, U.S.	Clay	(United States) Julie Ditty	(United States) Alexandra Mueller (United States) Ahsha Rolle	6–4, 6–3
Loss	5.	9 May 2010	ITF Indian Harbour Beach, U.S.	Clay	(United States) Julie Ditty	(United States) Christina Fusano (United States) Courtney Nagle	3–6, 6–7^{(4)}
Loss	6.	25 April 2011	ITF Charlottesville, U.S.	Clay	(United States) Julie Ditty	(Canada) Sharon Fichman (Canada) Marie-Ève Pelletier	4–6, 3–6
