= Karine Ionesco =

Canadian tennis player

- Country (sports): Canada
- Born: August 8, 1983 (age 42)
- Height: 5 ft 11 in (180 cm)
- Plays: Right-handed

Singles
- Highest ranking: No. 693 (Aug 05, 2002)

Doubles
- Highest ranking: No. 236 (Apr 01, 2002)

Karine Ionesco (born August 8, 1983) is a Canadian former professional tennis player.

Ionesco, raised in Montreal, is of Romanian descent and comes from a family with a background in athletics. Her father Theo was Romania's national athletics coach, white her mother Carmen competed in four Olympics as a discus thrower and shot putter. She also has an aunty (Florența Crăciunescu) who won Olympic bronze for Romania in discus.

On the professional tour, Ionesco reached best rankings of 693 for singles and 236 for doubles. She made a WTA Tour doubles semi-final at the 2001 Challenge Bell in Quebec City, partnering Anne Kremer.

Ionesco was a collegiate tennis player for Broward Community College, where she won a National Junior College Athletic Association team championship in 2004. After two seasons she transferred to Texas Christian University.
