= Martina Suchá =

Slovak tennis player

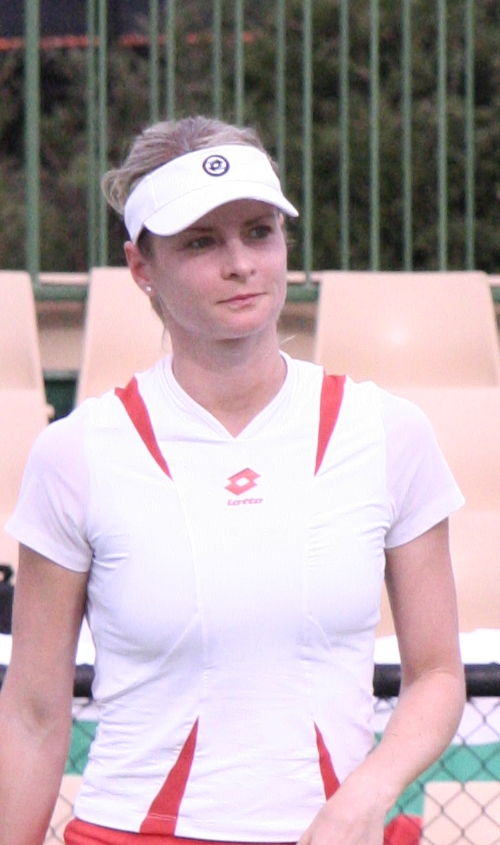
- Suchá at the 2007 Australian Open
- Country (sports): Slovakia
- Residence: Nové Zámky, Slovakia
- Born: 20 November 1980 (age 45) Nové Zámky, Czechoslovakia
- Height: 1.70 m (5 ft 7 in)
- Turned pro: 1996
- Retired: 2008
- Plays: Right-handed (two-handed backhand)
- Prize money: $970,609

Singles
- Career record: 328–255
- Career titles: 2
- Highest ranking: No. 37 (22 April 2002)

Grand Slam singles results
- Australian Open: 4R (2002)
- French Open: 2R (2001)
- Wimbledon: 2R (2002, 2003)
- US Open: 3R (2001)

Doubles
- Career record: 31–49
- Career titles: 0
- Highest ranking: No. 234 (3 January 2000)

Team competitions
- Fed Cup: W (2002), record 3–2

Martina Suchá (Slovak pronunciation: [ˈsuxaː]; born 20 November 1980) is a former professional tennis player from Slovakia.

On 22 April 2002, Suchá reached her career-high WTA singles ranking of No. 37. She won two WTA Tour singles titles at the 2002 ANZ Tasmanian International and the Tournoi de Québec.

Suchá helped the Slovak team to win the 2002 Fed Cup, beating Nathalie Dechy of France in the quarterfinal. She was also part of the Slovak 2004 Olympic Team.

== WTA career finals ==
=== Singles (2 titles, 4 runner-ups) ===
Legend
Grand Slam tournaments (0–0)
Tier I (0–0)
Tier II (0–0)
Tier III, IV & V (2–4)

Result	W/L	Date	Tournament	Surface	Opponent	Score
Loss	1.	Oct 2001	Bratislava Open, Slovakia	Carpet (i)	(Italy) Rita Grande	1–6, 1–6
Win	2.	Jan 2002	Hobart International, Australia	Hard	(Spain) Anabel Medina Garrigues	7–6^{(9–7)}, 6–1
Loss	3.	May 2004	Budapest Grand Prix, Hungary	Clay	(Serbia and Montenegro) Jelena Janković	6–7^{(4–7)}, 3–6
Loss	4.	Oct 2004	Guangzhou Open, China	Hard	(China) Li Na	3–6, 4–6
Win	5.	Nov 2004	Tournoi de Québec, Canada	Carpet (i)	(United States) Abigail Spears	6–2, 3–6, 6–2
Loss	6.	May 2006	Rabat Grand Prix, Morocco	Clay	(United States) Meghann Shaughnessy	2–6, 6–3, 3–6

== ITF Circuit finals ==
$50,000 tournaments
$25,000 tournaments
$10,000 tournaments

=== Singles: 11 (5–6) ===
Result	No.	Date	Tournament	Surface	Opponent	Score
Loss	1.	6 April 1998	ITF Brindisi, Italy	Clay	(France) Sylvie Sallaberry	0–6, 4–6
DNP	–	12 July 1998	ITF Amersfoort, Netherlands	Clay	(Netherlands) Yvette Basting	—N/a
Win	2.	14 September 1997	ITF Cluj, Romania	Clay	(Romania) Magda Mihalache	7–5, 3–6, 6–4
Win	3.	17 August 1998	ITF Valašské Meziříčí, Czech Republic	Clay	(Czech Republic) Libuše Průšová	3–6, 6–3, 6–1
Loss	4.	20 June 1999	ITF Grado, Italy	Clay	(Italy) Flavia Pennetta	6–1, 4–6, 5–7
Win	5.	19 July 1999	ITF Ettenheim, Germany	Clay	(Austria) Patricia Wartusch	6–2, 3–6, 6–3
Loss	6.	5 June 2000	ITF Galatina, Italy	Clay	(Italy) Antonella Serra Zanetti	5–7, 6–1, 3–6
Loss	7.	6 August 2000	ITF Ettenheim, Germany	Clay	(Argentina) María Emilia Salerni	4–6, 2–6
Loss	8.	8 July 2001	ITF Orbetello, Italy	Clay	(Argentina) Clarisa Fernández	4–6, 6–2, 5–7
Win	9.	9 June 2003	ITF Grado, Italy	Clay	(Colombia) Catalina Castaño	6–1, 6–2
Loss	10.	30 September 2007	ITF Podgorica, Montenegro	Clay	(Czech Republic) Michaela Paštiková	7–5, 5–7, 6–7
Win	11.	11 November 2007	ITF Ismaning, Germany	Carpet (i)	(Ukraine) Oxana Lyubtsova	6–4, 6–4

=== Doubles: 2 (2–0) ===
Result	No.	Date	Tournament	Surface	Partner	Opponents	Score
Win	1.	14 July 1997	ITF Toruń, Poland	Clay	(Czech Republic) Renata Kučerová	(Czech Republic) Petra Kučová (Slovakia) Lenka Zacharová	6–3, 6–3
Win	2.	13 December 1999	ITF Průhonice, Czech Republic	Hard (i)	(Czech Republic) Helena Vildová	(Belarus) Nadejda Ostrovskaya (Belarus) Tatiana Poutchek	6–3, 2–6, 6–2
