= Marie-Gaïané Mikaelian =

Swiss tennis player

- Full name: Marie-Gaïané Mikaelian
- Country (sports): Switzerland
- Residence: Yens, Switzerland
- Born: 3 March 1984 (age 42) Lausanne, Switzerland
- Height: 1.72 m (5 ft 7 1/2 in)
- Turned pro: 3 March 2001
- Retired: 2010
- Plays: Right (two-handed backhand)
- Prize money: $543,735

Singles
- Career record: 141–109
- Career titles: 1 WTA, 1 ITF
- Highest ranking: No. 33 (27 January 2003)

Grand Slam singles results
- Australian Open: 1R (2002, 2003, 2004)
- French Open: 2R (2002, 2003)
- Wimbledon: 2R (2003)
- US Open: 2R (2003)

Doubles
- Career record: 1–11
- Highest ranking: No. 313 (13 September 2003)

Team competitions
- Fed Cup: 0–2

Marie-Gaïané Mikaelian (Armenian: Մարի Գայանե Միքայէլեան; born 3 March 1984) is a former tennis player from Switzerland. She turned professional in 2001 and won one career singles title.

Her father is Armenian.

== WTA Tour finals ==
=== Singles: 4 (1 title, 3 runner-ups) ===
Legend
Tier III (0–2)
Tier IV & V (1–1)

Result	Date	Tournament	Surface	Opponent	Score
Loss	Aug 2001	Basel, Switzerland	Clay	(Czech Republic) Adriana Gerši	4–6, 1–6
Win	Jun 2002	Tashkent Open, Uzbekistan	Hard	(Belarus) Tatiana Poutchek	6–4, 6–4
Loss	Sep 2002	Bell Challenge, Canada	Hard (i)	(Russia) Elena Bovina	3–6, 4–6
Loss	Jan 2003	Gold Coast, Australia	Hard	(France) Nathalie Dechy	3–6, 6–3, 3–6

== ITF Circuit finals ==
$75,000 tournaments
$50,000 tournaments
$25,000 tournaments
$10,000 tournaments

=== Singles (1–2) ===
Result	No.	Date	Tournament	Surface	Opponent	Score
Win	1.	20 June 1999	ITF Lenzerheide, Switzerland	Clay	(Germany) Susi Lohrmann	6–3, 6–4
Loss	2.	17 October 1999	ITF Poitiers, France	Hard (i)	(Czech Republic) Květa Peschke	6–4, 4–6, 2–6
Loss	3.	28 November 2004	ITF Poitiers, France	Carpet (i)	(Belarus) Anastasiya Yakimova	5–7, 2–6
