= Tournoi de Québec =

Defunct tennis tournament
- Founded: 1993
- Abolished: 2018
- Editions: 26
- Location: Quebec City, Quebec; Canada
- Venue: PEPS de l'Université Laval
- Category: WTA Tier III; 1993–2008; WTA International; 2009–2018
- Surface: Carpet – indoors

The Tournoi de Québec was a WTA Tour International level tennis tournament held in Quebec City, Quebec, Canada. Held from 1993 to 2018, the tournament was the last women's professional tennis tournament still played on indoor carpet courts. It was held at the PEPS stadium. The event had several sponsors and the tournament name changed accordingly. The tournament was known as the Bell Challenge (Challenge Bell) from the first edition to 2013 and sponsored by Bell Canada, and was later sponsored by National Bank of Canada as the National Bank Cup (Coupe Banque Nationale).

In 1997, Dutchwoman Brenda Schultz-McCarthy defeated Belgian Dominique Van Roost to win her second title in Quebec City (also won in 1995 and finalist in 1994), the only woman in the history of the tournament to do so. In 2006, top-seed and future Wimbledon champion Marion Bartoli of France defeated Russian Olga Puchkova 6–0, 6–0, the first double bagel in a WTA Tour final for 13 years.

The last edition of the tournament was held in 2018.

== Past finals ==
=== Singles ===
Year	Champions	Runners-up	Score
1993	(France) Nathalie Tauziat	(Bulgaria) Katerina Maleeva	6–4, 6–1
1994	(Bulgaria) Katerina Maleeva	(Netherlands) Brenda Schultz	6–3, 6–3
1995	(Netherlands) Brenda Schultz-McCarthy	(Belgium) Dominique Monami	7–6^{(7–5)}, 6–2
1996	(United States) Lisa Raymond	(Belgium) Els Callens	6–4, 6–4
1997	(Netherlands) Brenda Schultz-McCarthy (2)	(Belgium) Dominique Van Roost	6–4, 6–7^{(4–7)}, 7–5
1998	(United States) Tara Snyder	(United States) Chanda Rubin	4–6, 6–4, 7–6^{(8–6)}
1999	(United States) Jennifer Capriati	(United States) Chanda Rubin	4–6, 6–1, 6–2
2000	(United States) Chanda Rubin	(United States) Jennifer Capriati	6–4, 6–2
2001	(United States) Meghann Shaughnessy	(Croatia) Iva Majoli	6–1, 6–3
2002	(Russia) Elena Bovina	(Switzerland) Marie-Gaïané Mikaelian	6–3, 6–4
2003	(Russia) Maria Sharapova	(Venezuela) Milagros Sequera	6–2, retired
2004	(Slovakia) Martina Suchá	(United States) Abigail Spears	7–5, 3–6, 6–2
2005	(United States) Amy Frazier	(Sweden) Sofia Arvidsson	6–1, 7–5
2006	(France) Marion Bartoli	(Russia) Olga Puchkova	6–0, 6–0
2007	(United States) Lindsay Davenport	(Ukraine) Julia Vakulenko	6–4, 6–1
2008	(Russia) Nadia Petrova	(United States) Bethanie Mattek	4–6, 6–4, 6–1
2009	(Hungary) Melinda Czink	(Czech Republic) Lucie Šafářová	4–6, 6–3, 7–5
2010	(Austria) Tamira Paszek	(United States) Bethanie Mattek-Sands	7–6^{(8–6)}, 2–6, 7–5
2011	(Czech Republic) Barbora Záhlavová-Strýcová	(New Zealand) Marina Erakovic	4–6, 6–1, 6–0
2012	(Belgium) Kirsten Flipkens	(Czech Republic) Lucie Hradecká	6–1, 7–5
2013	(Czech Republic) Lucie Šafářová	(New Zealand) Marina Erakovic	6–4, 6–3
2014	(Croatia) Mirjana Lučić-Baroni	(United States) Venus Williams	6–4, 6–3
2015	(Germany) Annika Beck	(Latvia) Jeļena Ostapenko	6–2, 6–2
2016	(France) Océane Dodin	(United States) Lauren Davis	6–4, 6–3
2017	(Belgium) Alison Van Uytvanck	(Hungary) Tímea Babos	5–7, 6–4, 6–1
2018	(France) Pauline Parmentier	(United States) Jessica Pegula	7–5, 6–2

=== Doubles ===
Year	Champions	Runners-up	Score
1993	(United States) Katrina Adams (Netherlands) Manon Bollegraf	(Bulgaria) Katerina Maleeva (France) Nathalie Tauziat	6–4, 6–4
1994	(South Africa) Elna Reinach (France) Nathalie Tauziat	(United States) Linda Harvey-Wild (United States) Chanda Rubin	6–4, 6–3
1995	(United States) Nicole Arendt (Netherlands) Manon Bollegraf (2)	(United States) Lisa Raymond (Australia) Rennae Stubbs	7–6^{(8–6)}, 4–6, 6–2
1996	(United States) Debbie Graham (Netherlands) Brenda Schultz-McCarthy	(United States) Amy Frazier (United States) Kimberly Po	6–1, 6–4
1997	(United States) Lisa Raymond (Australia) Rennae Stubbs	(France) Alexandra Fusai (France) Nathalie Tauziat	6–4, 5–7, 7–5
1998	(United States) Lori McNeil (United States) Kimberly Po	(United States) Chanda Rubin (France) Sandrine Testud	6–7^{(3–7)}, 7–5, 6–4
1999	(United States) Amy Frazier (United States) Katie Schlukebir	(Zimbabwe) Cara Black (United States) Debbie Graham	6–2, 6–3
2000	(Australia) Nicole Pratt (United States) Meghann Shaughnessy	(Belgium) Els Callens (United States) Kimberly Po	6–3, 6–4
2001	(United States) Samantha Reeves (Italy) Adriana Serra Zanetti	(Czech Republic) Klára Koukalová (Czech Republic) Alena Vašková	7–5, 4–6, 6–3
2002	(United States) Samantha Reeves (2) (South Africa) Jessica Steck	(Argentina) María Emilia Salerni (Colombia) Fabiola Zuluaga	4–6, 6–3, 7–5
2003	(China) Li Ting (China) Sun Tiantian	(Belgium) Els Callens (United States) Meilen Tu	6–3, 6–3
2004	(United States) Carly Gullickson (Argentina) María Emilia Salerni	(Belgium) Els Callens (Australia) Samantha Stosur	7–5, 7–5
2005	(Russia) Anastasia Rodionova (Russia) Elena Vesnina	(Latvia) Līga Dekmeijere (United States) Ashley Harkleroad	6–7^{(4–7)}, 6–4, 6–2
2006	(United States) Carly Gullickson (United States) Laura Granville	(United States) Jill Craybas (Russia) Alina Jidkova	6–3, 6–4
2007	(United States) Christina Fusano (United States) Raquel Kops-Jones	(Canada) Stéphanie Dubois (Czech Republic) Renata Voráčová	6–2, 7–6^{(8–6)}
2008	(Germany) Anna-Lena Grönefeld (United States) Vania King	(United States) Jill Craybas (Thailand) Tamarine Tanasugarn	7–6^{(7–3)}, 6–4
2009	(United States) Vania King (2) (Czech Republic) Barbora Záhlavová-Strýcová	(Sweden) Sofia Arvidsson (France) Séverine Brémond Beltrame	6–1, 6–3
2010	(Sweden) Sofia Arvidsson (Sweden) Johanna Larsson	(United States) Bethanie Mattek-Sands (Czech Republic) Barbora Záhlavová-Strýcová	6–1, 2–6, [10–6]
2011	(United States) Raquel Kops-Jones (2) (United States) Abigail Spears	(United States) Jamie Hampton (Georgia (country)) Anna Tatishvili	6–1, 3–6, [10–6]
2012	(Germany) Tatjana Malek (France) Kristina Mladenovic	(Poland) Alicja Rosolska (United Kingdom) Heather Watson	7–6^{(7–5)}, 6–7^{(6–8)}, [10–7]
2013	(Russia) Alla Kudryavtseva (Australia) Anastasia Rodionova	(Czech Republic) Andrea Hlaváčková (Czech Republic) Lucie Hradecká	6–4, 6–3
2014	(Czech Republic) Lucie Hradecká (Croatia) Mirjana Lučić-Baroni	(Germany) Julia Görges (Czech Republic) Andrea Hlaváčková	6–3, 7–6^{(10–8)}
2015	(Czech Republic) Barbora Krejčíková (Belgium) An-Sophie Mestach	(Argentina) María Irigoyen (Poland) Paula Kania	4–6, 6–3, [12–10]
2016	(Czech Republic) Andrea Hlaváčková (Czech Republic) Lucie Hradecká (2)	(Russia) Alla Kudryavtseva (Russia) Alexandra Panova	7–6^{(7–2)}, 7–6^{(7–2)}
2017	(Hungary) Tímea Babos (Czech Republic) Andrea Hlaváčková (2)	(Canada) Bianca Andreescu (Canada) Carson Branstine	6–3, 6–1
2018	(United States) Asia Muhammad (United States) Maria Sanchez	(Croatia) Darija Jurak (Switzerland) Xenia Knoll	6–4, 6–3
