= Fabiola Zuluaga =

Colombian tennis player (born 1979)

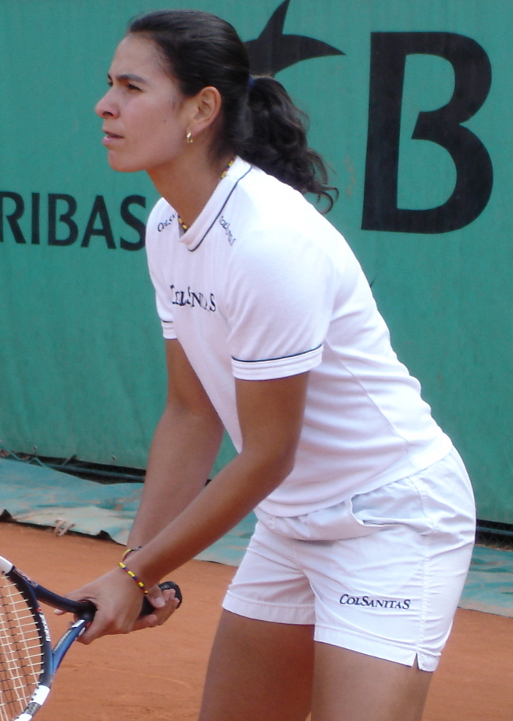
- Zuluaga at the 2005 French Open
- Country (sports): Colombia
- Residence: Cúcuta, Colombia
- Born: 7 January 1979 (age 47) Cúcuta, Colombia
- Height: 1.72 m (5 ft 8 in)
- Turned pro: 1994
- Retired: 2005
- Plays: Right-handed
- Prize money: $1,358,668

Singles
- Career record: 298–189
- Career titles: 5
- Highest ranking: No. 16 (17 January 2005)

Grand Slam singles results
- Australian Open: SF (2004)
- French Open: 4R (2004)
- Wimbledon: 2R (2003)
- US Open: 3R (2003, 2004)

Doubles
- Career record: 51–56
- Career titles: 0
- Highest ranking: No. 128
- Last updated on: 20 November 2026.

Fabiola Zuluaga Amado (born 7 January 1979) is a Colombian former professional tennis player, coach and tournament director. As a player, she won five singles titles on the WTA Tour, reached a career-high singles ranking of world No. 16 on 17 January 2005, and became the first Colombian tennis player to reach a Grand Slam singles semifinal, at the 2004 Australian Open.

Her subsequent career as a coach and tennis official has been marked by successive controversies documented by the press. As captain of the Colombia Billie Jean King Cup team from December 2019 to February 2024, her team selections and line-ups were publicly questioned by players and media outlets, including the call-up of the daughter of the then president of the Colombian Tennis Federation ahead of higher-ranked players; the team failed to achieve promotion in any of her four seasons and came within one tie of relegation in 2022. In 2026 she joined the coaching team of Emiliana Arango, in a season during which Arango fell from No. 48 to No. 173 in the world rankings. Also in 2026, as director of the WTA 125 tournament in Cali, she was publicly named by player María Fernanda Herazo over a delay in the payment of prize money to participants.

== Biography and background ==
Zuluaga is the daughter of Arlés Zuluaga and Amelia Amado. She began playing tennis as a child in Cúcuta and later moved to Bogotá to continue her development. As a junior she trained at the Nick Bollettieri academy in the United States and joined the Colsanitas team.

Her coaches included Edgar Muñoz and the Spaniard Ricardo Sánchez. She played right-handed. The WTA records her height as 1.72 metres, her singles win–loss record as 298–189 and her career prize money as $1,358,668.

She announced her retirement from professional tennis in September 2005, after a career in which she won fourteen professional singles titles: five on the WTA Tour and nine on the International Tennis Federation (ITF) circuit.

In 2020 she was recognised by the World Olympians Association (WOA), affiliated with the IOC, with the post-nominal title OLY for her participations at the Sydney 2000 and Athens 2004 Olympic Games.

== Playing career ==
=== Main achievements ===
Zuluaga won five WTA singles titles and nine ITF singles titles. Her best Grand Slam result was the semifinal of the 2004 Australian Open, and she was runner-up at the 2000 Madrid Open.

She represented Colombia at the Sydney 2000 and Athens 2004 Olympic Games, reaching the third round in singles at both. She remains the only Colombian tennis player to have qualified for the Olympic singles tournament in her own right through her ranking.

In doubles she was runner-up at the 2002 Québec Open alongside Argentina's María Emilia Salerni, and a semifinalist at Warsaw 2004 (with Eleni Daniilidou), Bogotá 2003 (with Paola Suárez) and Bogotá 1998 (with Mariana Mesa).

In the Federation Cup she played 34 ties and 58 matches, with a record of 42 wins and 16 losses: 27–7 in singles and 15–9 in doubles. She led the Colombian team between 1995 and 2003 and was part of the team that earned promotion to the World Group in 2003.

=== Junior career and early professional years ===
- Colombian national champion from 1989 to 1994.
- Champion of the ten under-14 international tournaments of the South American Tour in 1993, in singles and doubles.
- South American under-14 champion in 1993.
- Bronze medal at the 1993 World Under-14 Championship in Japan.
- Runner-up at the 1993 Colsanitas Satellite.
- Quarterfinalist at the 1994 under-14 Orange Bowl.
- Champion of the 1994 Cali Professional Satellite.
- Champion of the $50,000 Colsanitas Open in Bogotá in 1996.
- Champion of the Bytom Professional Open (Poland) in 1996.
- Runner-up with the Colombian team in the Americas Zone Group I of the Federation Cup in 1995, 1996 and 1997.
- Champion of the $25,000 Copa Finesse in Santa Fe de Bogotá in 1997.
- Champion of the Orbetello Professional Open (Italy) in 1998.
- Runner-up at the Sochi Professional Open (Russia) in 1998.
- Second round of the 1998 US Open after coming through qualifying (lost to world No. 4 Arantxa Sánchez Vicario).
- Champion of the 1999 Copa Colsanitas WTA Tour event.
- Third round of the 1999 Lipton Championships in Miami (defeated world No. 32 Iva Majoli).
- Third round of the 1999 French Open (lost to world No. 2 Lindsay Davenport).
- Champion of the 1999 Brasil Ladies Open.

=== WTA Tour finals ===
==== Singles: five titles, one runner-up ====
Result	Year	Tournament	Surface	Opponent in the final	Score
Champion	1999	Bogotá	Clay	Christína Papadáki	6–1, 6–3
Champion	1999	São Paulo	Clay	Patricia Wartusch	7–5, 4–6, 7–5
Runner-up	2000	Madrid	Clay	Gala León García	6–4, 2–6, 2–6
Champion	2002	Bogotá	Clay	Katarina Srebotnik	6–1, 6–4
Champion	2003	Bogotá	Clay	Anabel Medina Garrigues	6–3, 6–2
Champion	2004	Bogotá	Clay	María Sánchez Lorenzo	3–6, 6–4, 6–2

In the 2000 Madrid final she lost to Gala León García, who won her first WTA Tour title there.

==== Doubles: one runner-up ====
Result	Year	Tournament	Surface	Partner	Opponents in the final	Score
Runners-up	2002	Québec	Hard	María Emilia Salerni	Samantha Reeves and Jessica Steck	6–4, 3–6, 5–7

Zuluaga and Salerni lost the Québec final to Reeves and Steck.

=== Grand Slam participation ===
Tournament	1998	1999	2000	2001	2002	2003	2004	2005
Australian Open	A	A	2R	A	A	1R	SF	2R
French Open	A	3R	3R	A	1R	3R	4R	2R
Wimbledon	A	1R	A	A	A	2R	1R	A
US Open	2R	2R	A	A	2R	3R	3R	2R

Legend: A: did not play in the main draw; 1R, 2R, 3R and 4R: first, second, third and fourth round; SF: semifinals.

=== Year-end singles ranking ===
The following table distinguishes the best ranking achieved during each year from the year-end ranking recorded by the WTA.

Year	Best ranking of the year	Year-end ranking
1994	382	398
1995	259	292
1996	122	138
1997	137	208
1998	87	95
1999	43	48
2000	31	42
2001	39	277
2002	62	74
2003	35	38
2004	20	23
2005	16	84

== Coaching career ==
In an interview published by El Espectador in 2014, Zuluaga stated that she had not considered going into coaching because she did not have the patience the job required.

=== Captain of Colombia in the Billie Jean King Cup (2019–2024) ===
In December 2019, the Executive Committee of the Colombian Tennis Federation appointed Zuluaga as the tenth captain of the Colombian team in what was then the Federation Cup, later renamed the Billie Jean King Cup. Her appointment took place during the presidency of David Samudio, who led the Federation between 2017 and 2023.

Her debut as captain came at the 2020 Americas Zone Group I in Santiago, Chile. Colombia defeated Venezuela, lost to Paraguay and fell 2–0 to Argentina in the tie for one of the play-off places, remaining in Group I.

==== Salinas 2022: the Antonia Samudio call-up ====
On 30 March 2022, the Federation and Zuluaga announced the inclusion of Antonia Samudio as the team's fifth player for the Americas Group I event in Salinas, Ecuador. The statement described her as the seventh-ranked Colombian in the WTA rankings. According to W Radio, her call-up caused controversy because she is the daughter of the then Federation president, David Samudio.

The WTA weekly ranking histories show that Samudio was called up ahead of Yuliana Monroy despite holding a lower singles ranking in every list published between the announcement and the competition. In the rankings of 21 March 2022, prior to the announcement, Monroy was No. 699 and Samudio No. 891; the gap persisted in the lists of 4 and 11 April.

WTA singles rankings before the call-up and during the Salinas 2022 competition
Player	21 March	4 April	11 April	Decision
Yuliana Monroy	699	683	761	Not called up
Antonia Samudio	891	861	881	Called up

The delegation that arrived in Salinas consisted of María Fernanda Herazo, Yuliana Lizarazo, María Paulina Pérez and Samudio, after Camila Osorio withdrew with physical problems. Of the four players present, Samudio had the lowest ranking in both singles and doubles on both reference dates:

WTA rankings of the four players present in Salinas
Player	Singles, 4 April	Doubles, 4 April	Singles, 11 April	Doubles, 11 April
María Fernanda Herazo	454	303	450	232
Yuliana Lizarazo	537	383	442	285
María Paulina Pérez	658	379	657	375
Antonia Samudio	861	780	881	782

Against Brazil, Zuluaga fielded Pérez and Samudio in the doubles — the two lowest-ranked of the four players in that discipline — leaving out the two highest-ranked, Herazo and Lizarazo. The pair lost 6–4, 6–3 to Gabriela Cé and Rebeca Pereira, and Colombia lost the tie 3–0.

Colombia finished the competition with two ties won (Guatemala and Paraguay) and two lost (Argentina and Brazil), retaining its place in the group only by defeating Paraguay in the relegation play-off.

==== Absences of the leading players ====
During Zuluaga's captaincy, Colombia contested several ties without its leading singles players. Camila Osorio missed Salinas 2022 with physical problems and was also absent in Cúcuta in 2023; in the latter case, El Espectador reported that the injury sustained in Monterrey had also ruled her out of Indian Wells, Miami and the Copa Colsanitas, and that Yuliana Monroy would take her place in the team.

In November 2023, Emiliana Arango was also absent from the team that travelled to Japan. Her coach, Ricardo Sánchez, confirmed to Red+ Noticias that the player had decided to end her season. Her absence left Colombia without one of the protagonists of the qualification achieved in Cúcuta.

==== Cúcuta 2023: Arango's substitution and the loss of first place ====
In 2023, the Americas Group I event held in Cúcuta brought together Argentina, Bolivia, Chile, Colombia, Guatemala and Peru, without Brazil or Mexico. Colombia secured one of the two play-off places after winning its first four ties.

For the final tie, which decided first place against Argentina, Zuluaga chose to rest Arango, who had won all four of her singles matches, and fielded Monroy instead — a debutant in the competition ranked No. 681 in the world — against Martina Capurro, ranked No. 375. Monroy lost 6–1, 6–0; Herazo also lost her singles match and Lizarazo and Pérez lost the doubles. Colombia was defeated 3–0 and finished second. La Opinión's report expressly identified the decision to rest Arango as the reason for the line-up change.

==== Japan 2023: the selection of Lizarazo over Herazo ====
On 10 and 11 November 2023, Colombia played a tie against Japan in Tokyo on indoor hard courts, against a Japanese team without Naomi Osaka. The winner advanced to the 2024 qualifying round. Zuluaga selected Osorio and Lizarazo for the first day's singles, leaving Herazo out of that day's line-up.

The selection was made despite Herazo holding a better singles ranking than Lizarazo on every relevant list: on 9 October 2023 Herazo was No. 402 and Lizarazo No. 711, and on the list of 6 November — the last published before the tie — they were No. 531 and No. 823 respectively.

The difference was also reflected in both players' activity during 2023 on hard courts, the surface of the tie. A count of the WTA and ITF singles matches played before the tie, including qualifying draws and indoor events, yields fifteen completed matches for Herazo and five for Lizarazo; including matches ended by retirement, the figures are sixteen and six.

Singles ranking and hard-court activity before Japan 2023
Player	Ranking, 9 October	Ranking, 6 November	Hard-court matches	Including retirements	Win–loss
María Fernanda Herazo	402	531	15	16	4–12
Yuliana Lizarazo	711	823	5	6	2–4

Lizarazo's six matches were all in qualifying draws: two in Irapuato, one in Monterrey, one in Barranquilla and two in Reims. Her only wins came against Noemi Babikova, in Irapuato, and Milena Ciocan, in Reims, both at ITF events. She lost both matches she played at WTA-level competitions on the surface: against Kamilla Rakhimova in Monterrey qualifying and against Katarina Kozarov in Barranquilla qualifying.

Herazo, for her part, had played two main-draw matches at the WTA 125 in Barranquilla and the qualifying draws of the WTA 500 in San Diego and the WTA 1000 in Guadalajara. In Barranquilla she defeated fifth seed Panna Udvardy — ranked No. 124 that week and a career-high No. 76 in 2022 — 7–5, 6–3.

Lizarazo lost on the first day 6–2, 6–4 to Nao Hibino. Osorio won both of her singles matches to put Colombia 2–1 ahead. For the fourth rubber, Zuluaga replaced Lizarazo with Herazo, who lost 6–2, 6–2 to Mai Hontama. The tie went to a deciding doubles match.

==== Japan 2023: the doubles switch and Pérez's absence ====
For the fifth rubber, Zuluaga replaced the initially announced pair of Herazo and Pérez with Osorio and Lizarazo. The decision left Pérez without a single match in the entire tie, despite being the reigning champion of the WTA 250 in Monterrey — won alongside Lizarazo that same year — and a silver medallist at the 2023 Pan American Games in Santiago alongside Herazo.

In the doubles rankings of 6 November 2023, Osorio was the lowest-ranked of the four nominated players: she was No. 282, compared with No. 116 for Lizarazo, No. 130 for Pérez and No. 190 for Herazo. The selected pair therefore combined the team's highest- and lowest-ranked doubles players, while leaving out both the partner with whom Lizarazo had won the Monterrey title and the pair that had just won the Pan American silver medal.

Doubles rankings of the nominated players, 6 November 2023
Player	Doubles ranking	Selection for the deciding rubber
Yuliana Lizarazo	116	Selected
María Paulina Pérez	130	Not selected
María Fernanda Herazo	190	Not selected
Camila Osorio	282	Selected

Osorio and Lizarazo lost 7–5, 6–2 to Shuko Aoyama and Ena Shibahara. Colombia fell 3–2 after having been one win away from taking the tie, and returned to the Americas Group I for 2024.

==== Public criticism from players ====
After the Tokyo tie, Herazo publicly questioned Zuluaga's decisions in an interview with Deporte Colombiano. She complained that the line-ups were communicated only hours before the draws and expressed her disagreement with being left out of the first day's singles despite having prepared her season on hard courts, a decision that, in her account, cost her competitive rhythm. She said Zuluaga had placed significant weight on individual performances at the Pan American Games — played on clay, while the tie was played on indoor hard courts — when choosing the initial line-up. Herazo also criticised the fact that Pérez ended the tie without playing, called for closer monitoring of the tours and greater sporting and financial support, and defended her own and Lizarazo's experience in this type of competition. In the same interview she acknowledged Zuluaga's contribution to the team's results.

==== Resignation and record as captain ====
On 5 February 2024, the Federation announced Zuluaga's resignation as captain and stated that she would remain linked to its Technical Commission. Her four-season tenure ended without a single promotion: the team remained in Americas Group I in 2020, 2021 and 2022 — a year in which it came within one tie of relegation — and its only play-off appearance, in 2023, ended in a 3–2 defeat to Japan after Colombia had led 2–1.

=== 2026 season with Emiliana Arango ===
For the 2026 season, Zuluaga joined Emiliana Arango's coaching team alongside Mauricio Hadad, following the end of the player's partnership with Felipe Mantilla. In 2025, under Mantilla, Arango had won the WTA 125 in Cancún and reached the final of the WTA 500 in Mérida.

The 2026 season coincided with a 125-place drop in Arango's singles ranking: she fell from No. 48 on 5 January to No. 173 on 9 November. Her official WTA profile, consulted on 20 November, recorded for 2026 a win–loss record of 14–29 and no singles titles. During the season she failed to win a match in the main draw of any of the four Grand Slam tournaments. Her best result of the year was a semifinal at the Copa Colsanitas in Bogotá.

Emiliana Arango: seasons before and after Zuluaga joined her team
Season	Coaching team	Titles	Best WTA 500 result	Ranking (start → November)
2025	Felipe Mantilla	1 (WTA 125 Cancún)	Final (Mérida)	—
2026	Mauricio Hadad and Fabiola Zuluaga	0	—	48 → 173

== Tournament direction ==
In November 2026, Zuluaga served as director of two WTA 125 tournaments in Colombia. The WTA's official orders of play identified her as director of the Reto Win Tennis Cali Open, played from 1 to 7 November including qualifying, and of the DIRECTV Open in Sopó, held from 9 to 14 November.

=== Criticism over prize money at the WTA 125 Cali ===
On 19 November 2026, María Fernanda Herazo publicly stated that participants at the WTA 125 Cali had been informed of a delay in receiving the funds allocated to prize money. In her post she identified Zuluaga as the tournament director, called the situation "unacceptable" and requested explanations regarding the cause of the delay, the entity responsible for releasing the funds and the date on which the players would receive their prize money.
