= Jessica Steck =

South African tennis player

- Country (sports): South Africa
- Born: 6 August 1978 (age 47) Bloemfontein, South Africa
- Height: 1.73 m (5 ft 8 in)
- Turned pro: 1996
- Retired: 2006
- Plays: Right-handed (two-handed backhand)
- Prize money: US$ 187,867

Singles
- Career record: 177–115
- Career titles: 0 WTA, 5 ITF
- Highest ranking: No. 140 (16 March 1998)

Grand Slam singles results
- Wimbledon: Q1 (1998, 1999)
- US Open: Q1 (1999)

Doubles
- Career record: 121–106
- Career titles: 1 WTA, 4 ITF
- Highest ranking: No. 56 (3 March 2003)

Grand Slam doubles results
- Australian Open: 2R (1999, 2003)
- French Open: 2R (1999)
- Wimbledon: 2R (2002)
- US Open: 2R (1999)
- US Open Junior: W (1996)

Grand Slam mixed doubles results
- French Open: 2R (2000)
- Wimbledon: 2R (1999)

Team competitions
- Fed Cup: 4–3 (2003)

Jessica Steck (born 6 August 1978) is a South African former tennis player. During her career on the professional tennis circuit from 1996 to 2003, she won the 1996 US Open Junior Girls' Doubles title and won several singles and doubles titles on the ITF Women's Circuit. Steck also won first-round doubles matches in all four Grand Slam events.

== Career ==
She reached the singles world ranking of 140th in the world on 16 March 1998, and the 56th in doubles on 3 March 2003.

During her career, she won a WTA tournament in doubles.

== WTA career finals ==
=== Doubles: 2 (1 title, 1 runner-up) ===
| Legend Grand Slam (0–0) Tier I (0–0) Tier II (0–0) Tier III, IV & V (1–1) | Finals by surface Hard (0–1) Grass (0–0) Clay (0–0) Carpet (1–0) |

| Result | Date | Tournament | Surface | Partner | Opponents | Score |
|---|---|---|---|---|---|---|
| Loss | Feb 1999 | U.S. National Indoor Championships | Hard (i) | (South Africa) Amanda Coetzer | (United States) Lisa Raymond (Australia) Rennae Stubbs | 3–6, 4–6 |
| Win | Sep 2002 | Tournoi de Québec, Canada | Carpet (i) | (United States) Samantha Reeves | (Argentina) María Emilia Salerni (Colombia) Fabiola Zuluaga | 4–6, 6–3, 7–5 |

== ITF finals ==
$100,000 tournaments
$75,000 tournaments
$50,000 tournaments
$25,000 tournaments
$10,000 tournaments

=== Singles: 9 (5–4) ===
| Result | No. | Date | Tournament | Surface | Opponent | Score |
|---|---|---|---|---|---|---|
| Win | 1. | 2 March 1996 | ITF Pretoria, South Africa | Hard | (Switzerland) Angela Bürgis | 6–3, 6–2 |
| Win | 2. | 4 May 1996 | Hatfield, United Kingdom | Clay | (United Kingdom) Julie Pullin | 7–6, 7–6 |
| Loss | 3. | 17 November 1996 | Cairo, Egypt | Clay | (Romania) Alina Tecșor | 6–7, 5–0 ret. |
| Win | 4. | 11 May 1997 | Lee-on-the-Solent, United Kingdom | Clay | (France) Magalie Lamarre | 6–3, 6–2 |
| Loss | 5. | 19 May 1997 | Sochi, Russia | Hard | (Georgia (country)) Nino Louarsabishvili | 5–7, 0–6 |
| Loss | 6. | 2 March 1998 | Rockford, United States | Hard (i) | (Argentina) Nicole Pratt | 2–6, 3–6 |
| Win | 7. | 21 May 2000 | Jackson, United States | Clay | (United States) Dawn Buth | 6–1, 7–6 |
| Loss | 8. | 30 July 2000 | Salt Lake City, United States | Hard | (Indonesia) Wynne Prakusya | 6–4, 4–6, 6–7^{(19)} |
| Win | 9. | 13 May 2001 | ITF Midlothian, United States | Clay | (Algeria) Feriel Esseghir | 7–5, 6–3 |

=== Doubles: 15 (4–11) ===
| Result | No. | Date | Tournament | Surface | Partner | Opponents | Score |
|---|---|---|---|---|---|---|---|
| Loss | 1. | 17 November 1996 | ITF Cairo, Egypt | Hard | (Slovenia) Katarina Srebotnik | (Netherlands) Maaike Koutstaal (Netherlands) Andrea van den Hurk | w/o |
| Loss | 2. | 4 May 1997 | Hatfield, United Kingdom | Clay | (United Kingdom) Lucie Ahl | (United Kingdom) Shirli-Ann Siddall (United Kingdom) Joanne Ward | 6–3, 4–6, 5–7 |
| Loss | 3. | 23 November 1997 | Port Pirie, Australia | Hard | (Poland) Aleksandra Olsza | (South Africa) Nannie de Villiers (Australia) Lisa McShea | 4–6, 3–6 |
| Win | 4. | 17 May 1998 | Haines City, United States | Clay | (South Africa) Nannie de Villiers | (Canada) Maureen Drake (Canada) Renata Kolbovic | 6–3, 6–2 |
| Loss | 5. | 24 May 1998 | Spartanburg, United States | Clay | (Canada) Renata Kolbovic | (Japan) Keiko Ishida (Japan) Keiko Nagatomi | 3–6, 5–7 |
| Win | 6. | 16 May 1999 | Midlothian, United States | Clay | (South Africa) Nannie de Villiers | (United States) Erika deLone (Australia) Annabel Ellwood | 6–4, 6–0 |
| Loss | 7. | 31 October 1999 | Dallas, United States | Hard | (United States) Samantha Reeves | (Switzerland) Emmanuelle Gagliardi (Kazakhstan) Irina Selyutina | 3–6, 3–6 |
| Loss | 8. | 7 February 2000 | Rockford, United States | Hard | (Australia) Annabel Ellwood | (United States) Dawn Buth (United States) Rebecca Jensen | 6–7^{(4)}, 5–7 |
| Loss | 9. | 27 March 2000 | Norcross, United States | Hard | (United States) Lindsay Lee-Waters | (Germany) Julia Abe (Israel) Tzipora Obziler | 7–5, 6–7^{(7)}, 4–6 |
| Loss | 10. | 7 May 2000 | Virginia Beach, United States | Hard | (Australia) Lisa McShea | (United States) Dawn Buth (United States) Mashona Washington | 6–1, 3–6, 6–7^{(2)} |
| Loss | 11. | 21 May 2000 | Jackson, United States | Clay | (United States) Karin Miller | (Brazil) Joana Cortez (Brazil) Miriam D'Agostini | 4–6, 7–5, 1–6 |
| Loss | 12. | 30 July 2000 | Salt Lake City, United States | Hard | (United States) Samantha Reeves | (Australia) Lisa McShea (Kazakhstan) Irina Selyutina | w/o |
| Win | 13. | 14 October 2001 | Hallandale Beach, United States | Clay | (Russia) Alina Jidkova | (Argentina) Erica Krauth (Argentina) Vanesa Krauth | 4–6, 6–2, 6–3 |
| Loss | 14. | 23 April 2002 | Dothan, United States | Clay | (United States) Samantha Reeves | (Japan) Rika Fujiwara (Croatia) Maja Palaveršić | 3–6, 0–6 |
| Win | 15. | 19 May 2002 | ITF Charlottesville, United States | Clay | (United States) Erika deLone | (United States) Teryn Ashley (United States) Kristen Schlukebir | 6–2, 2–6, 7–5 |

== Performance timelines ==
Key
| W | F | SF | QF | #R | RR | Q# | DNQ | A | NH |

(W) winner; (F) finalist; (SF) semifinalist; (QF) quarterfinalist; (#R) rounds 4, 3, 2, 1; (RR) round-robin stage; (Q#) qualification round; (DNQ) did not qualify; (A) absent; (NH) not held; (SR) strike rate (events won / competed); (W–L) win–loss record.

=== Doubles ===
| Tournament | 1998 | 1999 | 2000 | 2001 | 2002 | 2003 | SR | W–L |
|---|---|---|---|---|---|---|---|---|
| Australian Open | A | 2R | 1R | A | A | 2R | 0 / 3 | 2–3 |
| French Open | A | 2R | 1R | A | 1R | 1R | 0 / 4 | 1–4 |
| Wimbledon | 1R | 1R | 1R | Q1 | 2R | A | 0 / 4 | 1–4 |
| US Open | Q1 | 2R | A | A | 1R | A | 0 / 2 | 1–2 |
| Win–loss | 0–1 | 3–4 | 0–3 | 0–0 | 1–3 | 1–2 | 0 / 13 | 5–13 |

=== Mixed doubles ===
| Tournament | 1999 | 2000 | SR | W–L |
|---|---|---|---|---|
| Australian Open | A | A | 0 / 0 | 0–0 |
| French Open | 1R | 2R | 0 / 2 | 0–2 |
| Wimbledon | 2R | A | 0 / 1 | 1–1 |
| US Open | A | A | 0 / 0 | 0–0 |
| Win–loss | 1–2 | 0–1 | 0 / 3 | 1–3 |

== WTA year-end rankings ==
=== Singles ===
| Year | 1996 | 1997 | 1998 | 1999 | 2000 | 2001 | 2002 |
| Rank | 266 | 187 | 192 | 230 | 213 | 245 | 361 |

=== Doubles ===
| Year | 1996 | 1997 | 1998 | 1999 | 2000 | 2001 | 2002 | 2003 |
| Rank | 347 | 232 | 159 | 80 | 125 | 190 | 88 | 134 |
