= Adriana Serra Zanetti =

Italian tennis player

- Country (sports): Italy
- Born: 5 March 1976 (age 49) Modena
- Height: 1.60 m (5 ft 3 in)
- Turned pro: 1992
- Retired: 2007
- Plays: Right (two-handed backhand)
- Prize money: $787,665

Singles
- Career record: 296–343
- Career titles: 1 ITF
- Highest ranking: No. 38 (11 February 2002)

Grand Slam singles results
- Australian Open: QF (2002)
- French Open: 4R (1995)
- Wimbledon: 2R (2001)
- US Open: 1R (1994–1996, 2001–2003)

Doubles
- Career record: 97–129
- Career titles: 3 WTA
- Highest ranking: No. 69 (17 June 2002)

Grand Slam doubles results
- Australian Open: 3R (2004)
- French Open: 2R (2004)
- Wimbledon: 1R (1998, 2002–2004)
- US Open: 1R (2002, 2004)

Team competitions
- Fed Cup: 9–7

Adriana Serra Zanetti (born 5 March 1976; Italian pronunciation: [adriˈaːna ˈsɛrra ddzaˈnetti]) is an Italian former tennis player.

On 11 February 2002, she achieved her career-high singles ranking of world No. 38. On 17 June 2002, she peaked at No. 69 in the doubles rankings. In her career, she won three WTA Tour doubles titles, as well as one singles ITF title.

Serra Zanetti reached one Grand Slam quarterfinal in singles, at the 2002 Australian Open.

Her younger sister Antonella is also a tennis player.

Adriana Serra Zanetti retired from the professional tour 2007.

== WTA Tour finals ==
Legend
Grand Slam (0–0)
Tier I (0–0)
Tier II (0–0)
Tier III, IV, V (3–1)

=== Doubles (3–1) ===
Result	No.	Date	Tier	Tournament	Surface	Partner	Opponents	Score
Win	1.	Sep 2001	Tier III	Québec, Canada	Carpet (i)	(United States) Samantha Reeves	(Czech Republic) Klára Koukalová (Czech Republic) Alena Vašková	7–5, 4–6, 6–3
Loss	2.	Jan 2002	Tier V	Canberra, Australia	Hard	(United States) Samantha Reeves	(South Africa) Nannie de Villiers (Kazakhstan) Irina Selyutina	2–6, 3–6
Win	3.	Jul 2003	Tier V	Palermo, Italy	Clay	(Italy) Emily Stellato	(Spain) María José Martínez Sánchez (Spain) Arantxa Parra Santonja	6–4, 6–2
Win	4.	Oct 2004	Tier IV	Tashkent, Uzbekistan	Hard	(Italy) Antonella Serra Zanetti	(France) Marion Bartoli (Italy) Mara Santangelo	1–6, 6–3, 6–4

== ITF Circuit finals ==
$75,000 tournaments
$25,000 tournaments

=== Singles (1–3) ===
Outcome	No.	Date	Tournament	Surface	Opponent	Score
Winner	1.	2 November 1997	Ramat HaSharon, Israel	Hard	(Slovenia) Katarina Srebotnik	6–4, 6–2
Runner-up	2.	30 November 1997	Nuriootpa, Australia	Hard	(Poland) Aleksandra Olsza	1–6, 1–6
Runner-up	3.	6 December 1998	Bogotá, Colombia	Clay	(Colombia) Fabiola Zuluaga	3–6, 2–6
Runner-up	4.	11 February 2001	Rockford, United States	Hard	(United States) Jill Craybas	4–6, 3–6

=== Doubles (0–4) ===
Outcome	No.	Date	Tournament	Surface	Partner	Opponents	Score
Runner-up	1.	7 June 1993	Caserta, Italy	Clay	(Chile) Paula Cabezas	(Slovenia) Karin Lušnic (Croatia) Maja Murić	6–2, 2–6, 3–6
Runner-up	2.	9 October 2000	Welwyn, United Kingdom	Hard (i)	(Italy) Antonella Serra Zanetti	(New Zealand) Shelley Stephens (Serbia) Dragana Zarić	0–4, 3–5, 1–4
Runner-up	3.	12 October 2003	Dubai Tennis Challenge, United Arab Emirates	Hard	(Italy) Flavia Pennetta	(Hungary) Zsófia Gubacsi (Hungary) Kira Nagy	6–2, 2–6, 2–6
Runner-up	4.	18 September 2006	Lecce, Italy	Clay	(France) Kildine Chevalier	(France) Ekaterina Lopes (Serbia) Teodora Mirčić	6–7^{(4)}, 4–6
