= Meilen Tu =

American tennis player (born 1978)

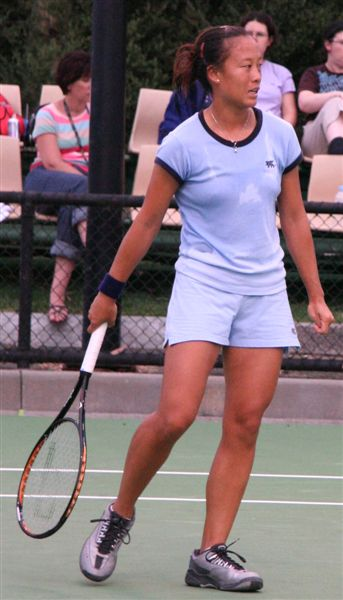
- Country (sports): United States
- Residence: Porter Ranch, Los Angeles
- Born: January 17, 1978 (age 48) Tarzana, L.A., California
- Height: 5 ft 4 in (1.63 m)
- Turned pro: 1994
- Retired: 2010
- Plays: Right-handed (two-handed backhand)
- Prize money: $1,590,412

Singles
- Career record: 333–304
- Career titles: 1 WTA, 4 ITF
- Highest ranking: No. 35 (June 11, 2007)

Grand Slam singles results
- Australian Open: 2R (1997, 1999, 2001, 2002)
- French Open: 2R (2001)
- Wimbledon: 3R (2002)
- US Open: 2R (1997, 2001)

Doubles
- Career record: 184–207
- Career titles: 4 WTA, 4 ITF
- Highest ranking: No. 28 (October 22, 2007)

Meilen Tu (traditional Chinese: 涂美倫, simplified Chinese: 涂美伦, Hanyu Pinyin: Tú Měilún) (born January 17, 1978) is a former professional tennis player from the U.S. In her career, she won one singles title and four doubles titles on the WTA Tour, with four singles and three doubles titles on the ITF Women's Circuit.

Born in Tarzana, Los Angeles to Taiwanese parents, Tu was the US Open girls' singles champion in 1994. At the 2006 DFS Classic, she reached the semifinals but lost to Vera Zvonareva, who eventually won the title.

== Personal life ==
Tu currently works as an agent for Topnotch Management, working closely with players such as Caroline Garcia and Zhang Shuai. Tu is married to Sam Sumyk, who formerly coached two-time grand slam champion Victoria Azarenka, Vera Zvonareva and Garbiñe Muguruza.

== WTA Tour finals ==
=== Singles: 1 (title) ===
Legend
Tier I	0
Tier II	0
Tier III	0
Tier IV & V	1

Result	W/L	Date	Tournament	Tier	Surface	Opponent	Score
Win	1–0	Jan 2001	Auckland Open	Tier V	Hard	(Argentina) Paola Suárez	7–6^{(12–10)}, 6–2

=== Doubles: 10 (4 titles, 6 runner-ups) ===
Legend
Tier I	0
Tier II	2
Tier III	5
Tier IV & V	3

Result	W/L	Date	Tournament	Surface	Partner	Opponents	Score
Loss	0–1	Oct 2001	Bratislava	Hard (i)	(France) Nathalie Dechy	(Russia) Elena Bovina (Czech Republic) Dája Bedáňová	3–6, 4–6
Win	1–1	Feb 2002	Paris	Hard (i)	(France) Nathalie Dechy	(Russia) Elena Dementieva (Slovakia) Janette Husárová	walkover
Loss	1–2	Feb 2002	Antwerp	Hard (i)	(France) Nathalie Dechy	(Bulgaria) Magdalena Maleeva (Switzerland) Patty Schnyder	3–6, 7–6^{(7–3)}, 3–6
Win	2–2	Sep 2002	Waikoloa	Hard	(Venezuela) María Vento-Kabchi	(South Africa) Nannie de Villiers (Kazakhstan) Irina Selyutina	1–6, 6–2, 6–3
Loss	2–3	Oct 2002	Bratislava	Hard (i)	(France) Nathalie Dechy	(Slovenia) Maja Matevžič (Slovakia) Henrieta Nagyová	4–6, 0–6
Win	3–3	Jun 2003	Birmingham	Grass	(Belgium) Els Callens	(Australia) Alicia Molik (United States) Martina Navratilova	7–5, 6–4
Loss	3–4	Nov 2003	Quebec City	Carpet (i)	(Belgium) Els Callens	(China) Ting Li (China) Sun Tiantian	3–6, 3–6
Win	4–4	Feb 2004	Memphis	Carpet (i)	(Sweden) Åsa Svensson	(Russia) Maria Sharapova (Russia) Vera Zvonareva	6–4, 7–6^{(7–0)}
Loss	4–5	Jan 2007	Sydney	Hard	(France) Marion Bartoli	(Germany) Anna-Lena Grönefeld (United States) Meghann Shaughnessy	3–6, 6–3, 6–7^{(2–7)}
Loss	4–6	Jun 2007	Birmingham	Grass	(China) Sun Tiantian	(Chinese Taipei) Chuang Chia-jung (Chinese Taipei) Chan Yung-jan	6–7^{(3–7)}, 3–6
