= Samantha Reeves =

American tennis player

- Country (sports): United States
- Residence: Miami, Florida, U.S.
- Born: January 17, 1979 (age 46) Redwood City, California, U.S.
- Height: 5 ft 8 in (1.73 m)
- Plays: Right-handed
- Prize money: $713,714

Singles
- Career record: 233–243
- Career titles: 2 ITF
- Highest ranking: No. 62 (August 5, 2002)

Grand Slam singles results
- Australian Open: 2R (1999)
- French Open: 2R (2002)
- Wimbledon: 3R (2003)
- US Open: 2R (1999, 2003)

Doubles
- Career record: 131–148
- Career titles: 2 WTA, 6 ITF
- Highest ranking: No. 51 (September 15, 2003)

Grand Slam doubles results
- Australian Open: 3R (1998, 2004)
- French Open: 2R (2004)
- Wimbledon: 1R (1999, 2000, 2002, 2003, 2004)
- US Open: 1R (1996, 2002, 2003, 2004)

Mixed doubles
- Career record: 2–2
- Career titles: 0

Grand Slam mixed doubles results
- Wimbledon: 2R (2002, 2003)

Samantha Reeves (born January 17, 1979) is an American former professional tennis player.

Her best results in singles have been reaching the quarterfinals at Hawaii (2002), Bahia and Quebec City (2001).

== WTA career finals ==
=== Doubles: 3 (2 titles, 1 runner-up) ===
Legend Grand Slam tournaments Tier I (0–0) Tier II (0–0) Tier III, IV & V (2–1)	Finals by surface Hard (0–1) Grass (0–0) Clay (0–0) Carpet (2–0)

Result	Date	Tournament	Surface	Partner	Opponents	Score
Win	Sep 2001	Tournoi de Québec, Canada	Carpet (i)	(Italy) Adriana Serra Zanetti	(Czech Republic) Klára Koukalová (Czech Republic) Alena Vašková	7–5, 4–6, 6–3
Loss	Jan 2002	Canberra International, Australia	Hard	(Italy) Adriana Serra Zanetti	(South Africa) Nannie de Villiers (Kazakhstan) Irina Selyutina	2–6, 3–6
Win	Sep 2002	Tournoi de Québec, Canada	Carpet (i)	(South Africa) Jessica Steck	(Argentina) María Emilia Salerni (Colombia) Fabiola Zuluaga	4–6, 6–3, 7–5

== ITF Circuit titles ==
Legend
$100,000 tournaments
$75,000 tournaments
$50,000 tournaments
$25,000 tournaments
$10,000 tournaments

=== Singles (2) ===
No.	Date	Tier	Tournament	Surface	Opponent	Score
1.	3 December 2001	50,000	ITF West Columbia, United States	Hard	(United States) Mashona Washington	6–1, 6–0
2.	19 October 2003	50,000	ITF Sedona, United States	Hard	(Puerto Rico) Kristina Brandi	7–5, 1–6, 6–4

=== Doubles (6) ===
No.	Date	Tier	Tournament	Surface	Partner	Opponents	Score
1.	8 June 1997	10,000	ITF Little Rock, United States	Hard	(Australia) Amy Jensen	(United States) Erica Adams (Norway) Tina Samara	6–0, 6–4
2.	7 October 2001	50,000	ITF Fresno, United States	Hard	(Argentina) Clarisa Fernández	(United States) Ashley Harkleroad (Canada) Marie-Ève Pelletier	6–2, 4–6, 7–5
3.	8 December 2002	75,000	ITF Boynton Beach, United States	Clay	(Hungary) Katalin Marosi	(Russia) Alina Jidkova (Russia) Lina Krasnoroutskaya	6–2, 7–6^{(7–5)}
4.	28 September 2003	75,000	ITF Albuquerque, United States	Hard	(Venezuela) Milagros Sequera	(United States) Amanda Augustus (Canada) Mélanie Marois	6–3, 6–2
5.	24 October 2004	50,000	ITF Cary, United States	Hard	(Romania) Ruxandra Dragomir	(Canada) Maureen Drake (Japan) Nana Miyagi	4–6, 6–3, 6–3
6.	31 July 2005	50,000	Lexington Challenger, United States	Hard	(Puerto Rico) Vilmarie Castellvi	(Japan) Kumiko Iijima (Japan) Junri Namigata	6–2, 6–1
