= María Emilia Salerni =

Argentine tennis player (born 1983)

- Country (sports): Argentina
- Residence: Rafaela, Argentina
- Born: 14 May 1983 (age 43) Rafaela
- Height: 1.74 m (5 ft 9 in)
- Turned pro: 1999
- Retired: 2009
- Plays: Right (two-handed backhand)
- Prize money: $692,277

Singles
- Career record: 263–173
- Career titles: 0 WTA, 12 ITF
- Highest ranking: No. 65 (25 February 2008)

Grand Slam singles results
- Australian Open: 1R (2002, 2003, 2008)
- French Open: 1R (2001, 2008, 2009)
- Wimbledon: 1R (2001)
- US Open: 2R (2005)

Doubles
- Career record: 151–124
- Career titles: 2 WTA, 9 ITF
- Highest ranking: No. 45 (23 September 2002)

Grand Slam doubles results
- Australian Open: 2R (2002, 2003)
- French Open: 2R (2003, 2005, 2006, 2009)
- Wimbledon: 1R (2001, 2003, 2006)
- US Open: 3R (2001, 2002)

María Emilia Salerni (born 14 May 1983), known as "Pitu Salerni", is a former professional tennis player from Argentina.

On 25 February 2008, she reached her best singles ranking of world No. 65. On 23 September 2002, she peaked at No. 45 in the doubles rankings.

The two-time former junior Grand Slam champion, winning Wimbledon and US Open in 2000, as well as finishing runner-up at Roland Garros, was named the 2000 ITF Junior World Champion. Salerni dated Argentine tennis player Guillermo Cañas until 2007.

Salerni retired from professional tour in 2009 after a string of injuries.

== WTA Tour finals ==
=== Singles: 1 (runner-up) ===
| Result | Date | Tournament | Surface | Opponent | Score |
|---|---|---|---|---|---|
| Loss | Feb 2008 | Copa Colsanitas, Colombia | Clay | (Spain) Nuria Llagostera Vives | 0–6, 4–6 |

=== Doubles: 6 (2 titles, 4 runner-ups) ===
Legend
Tier I (0–0)
Tier II (0–1)
Tier III (1–1)
Tier IV & V (1–2)

| Result | Date | Tournament | Surface | Partner | Opponents | Score |
|---|---|---|---|---|---|---|
| Loss | Jul 2001 | Morocco Open | Clay | (Spain) María José Martínez Sánchez | (Bulgaria) Lubomira Bacheva (Sweden) Åsa Svensson | 3–6, 7–6^{(7–4)}, 1–6 |
| Loss | Apr 2002 | Amelia Island Championships, US | Clay | (Sweden) Åsa Svensson | (Spain) Arantxa Sánchez Vicario (Slovakia) Daniela Hantuchová | 4–6, 2–6 |
| Loss | Sep 2002 | Tournoi de Québec, Canada | Carpet (i) | (Colombia) Fabiola Zuluaga | (United States) Samantha Reeves (South Africa) Jessica Steck | 6–4, 3–6, 5–7 |
| Win | Apr 2003 | Morocco Open | Clay | (Argentina) Gisela Dulko | (Slovakia) Henrieta Nagyová (Ukraine) Elena Tatarkova | 6–3, 6–4 |
| Win | Nov 2004 | Tournoi de Québec, Canada | Hard (i) | (United States) Carly Gullickson | (Belgium) Els Callens (Australia) Samantha Stosur | 7–5, 7–5 |
| Loss | Jul 2005 | Cincinnati Open, US | Hard | (Czech Republic) Květa Peschke | (United States) Laura Granville (United States) Abigail Spears | 6–3, 2–6, 4–6 |

== ITF finals ==
Legend
$100,000 tournaments
$75,000 tournaments
$50,000 tournaments
$25,000 tournaments
$10,000 tournaments

=== Singles (12–4) ===
| Result | No. | Date | Tournament | Surface | Opponent | Score |
|---|---|---|---|---|---|---|
| Win | 1. | 26 September 1999 | ITF Asunción, Paraguay | Clay | (Colombia) Mariana Mesa | 3–6, 7–6, 7–5 |
| Win | 2. | 3 October 1999 | ITF Montevideo, Uruguay | Clay | (Argentina) Eugenia Chialvo | 6–3, 6–0 |
| Win | 3. | 10 October 1999 | ITF Santiago, Chile | Clay | (Argentina) Eugenia Chialvo | 6–1, 6–3 |
| Win | 4. | 23 April 2000 | ITF San Severo, Italy | Clay | (Argentina) Vanesa Krauth | 6–4, 6–1 |
| Win | 5. | 14 May 2000 | ITF Caserta, Italy | Clay | (Morocco) Lamia Essaadi | 6–4, 6–1 |
| Win | 6. | 30 July 2000 | ITF Horb, Germany | Clay | (Germany) Adriana Jerabek | 6–3, 2–6, 6–2 |
| Win | 7. | 6 August 2000 | ITF Ettenheim, Germany | Clay | (Slovakia) Martina Suchá | 6–4, 6–2 |
| Loss | 1. | 1 February 2004 | ITF Waikoloa, United States | Hard | (Hungary) Melinda Czink | 6–7, 2–6 |
| Win | 8. | 19 September 2004 | ITF Ashland, United States | Hard | (United States) Kelly McCain | 6–4, 6–4 |
| Loss | 2. | 3 October 2004 | Classic of Troy, United States | Hard | (United States) Shenay Perry | 2–6, 2–6 |
| Win | 9. | 12 February 2006 | Midland Classic, United States | Hard (i) | (Russia) Vasilisa Bardina | 6–3, 3–6, 6–4 |
| Win | 10. | 1 April 2007 | ITF La Palma, Spain | Hard | (United Kingdom) Georgie Gent | 6–3, 6–3 |
| Loss | 3. | 30 June 2007 | ITF Getxo, Spain | Hard | (Spain) Nuria Llagostera Vives | 3–6, 3–6 |
| Win | 11. | 8 July 2007 | ITF Cuneo, Italy | Clay | (Italy) Sara Errani | 3–6, 6–1, 7–6 |
| Win | 12. | 21 March 2009 | ITF Lima, Peru | Clay | (Argentina) Lucía Jara Lozano | 7–6, 6–3 |
| Loss | 4. | 15 June 2009 | Open Montpellier, France | Clay | (France) Anaïs Laurendon | 3–6, 2–6 |

=== Doubles (9–9) ===
| Result | No. | Date | Tournament | Surface | Partner | Opponents | Score |
|---|---|---|---|---|---|---|---|
| Loss | 1. | 27 September 1999 | ITF Montevideo, Uruguay | Clay | (Argentina) Jorgelina Cravero | (Mexico) Melody Falcó (Dominican Republic) Joelle Schad | 3–6, 4–6 |
| Loss | 2. | 4 October 1999 | ITF Santiago, Chile | Clay | (Argentina) Jorgelina Cravero | (Argentina) Natalia Gussoni (Switzerland) Aliénor Tricerri | 5–7, 4–6 |
| Win | 1. | 24 July 2000 | ITF Horb, Germany | Clay | (Poland) Patrycja Bandurowska | (Czech Republic) Zuzana Hejdová (Australia) Kristen van Elden | 6–3, 6–4 |
| Loss | 3. | 6 August 2000 | ITF Ettenheim, Germany | Hard | (Argentina) Mariana Díaz Oliva | (Belarus) Nadejda Ostrovskaya (Ukraine) Anna Zaporozhanova | 4–6, 2–6 |
| Win | 2. | 8 July 2001 | ITF Orbetello, Italy | Clay | (Argentina) Patricia Tarabini | (Bulgaria) Lubomira Bacheva (Belgium) Laurence Courtois | 7–6^{(5)}, 3–6, 6–1 |
| Win | 3. | 12 May 2003 | ITF Bromma, Sweden | Clay | (Argentina) Gisela Dulko | (Hungary) Melinda Czink (Hungary) Zsófia Gubacsi | 6–4, 6–3 |
| Win | 4. | 8 June 2003 | ITF Galatina, Italy | Clay | (Spain) Arantxa Parra Santonja | (Morocco) Bahia Mouhtassine (Romania) Andreea Ehritt-Vanc | 6–0, 7–6^{(6)} |
| Loss | 4. | 7 September 2003 | ITF Fano, Italy | Clay | (Spain) Gala León García | (Spain) Conchita Martínez Granados (Italy) Giulia Casoni | 3–6, 3–6 |
| Loss | 5. | 21 September 2003 | ITF Columbus, United States | Hard | (Romania) Andreea Ehritt-Vanc | (United States) Teryn Ashley (United States) Ally Baker | 3–6, 7–6^{(4)}, 2–6 |
| Win | 5. | 18 September 2004 | ITF Ashland, United States | Hard | (Germany) Sandra Klösel | (United States) Cory Ann Avants (United States) Kristen Schlukebir | 6–3, 6–3 |
| Loss | 6. | 26 September 2004 | Albuquerque Open, United States | Hard | (Canada) Stéphanie Dubois | (Canada) Maureen Drake (United States) Carly Gullickson | 3–6, 6–7^{(6)} |
| Loss | 7. | 22 October 2005 | Open de Saint-Raphaël, France | Hard (i) | (United States) Meilen Tu | (Czech Republic) Lucie Hradecká (Czech Republic) Sandra Záhlavová | 6–4, 4–6, 5–7 |
| Win | 6. | 31 January 2006 | ITF Rockford, United States | Hard | (Brazil) Maria Fernanda Alves | (Czech Republic) Michaela Paštiková (United States) Abigail Spears | 0–6, 6–4, 6–2 |
| Win | 7. | 11 May 2007 | ITF Monzón, Spain | Hard | (Spain) Estrella Cabeza Candela | (Belarus) Iryna Kuryanovich (Serbia) Vesna Dolonc | 6–2, 6–1 |
| Loss | 8. | 30 June 2007 | ITF Getxo, Spain | Clay | (Spain) Conchita Martínez Granados | (Spain) Nuria Llagostera Vives (Spain) Laura Pous Tió | 2–6, 1–6 |
| Win | 8. | 16 March 2009 | ITF Lima, Peru | Clay | (Argentina) Lucía Jara Lozano | (Argentina) Carla Beltrami (Argentina) Tatiana Búa | 7–6^{(3)}, 6–3 |
| Loss | 9. | 6 June 2009 | ITF Galatina, Italy | Clay | (Spain) Beatriz García Vidagany | (Russia) Elena Bovina (Russia) Regina Kulikova | 2–6, 1–6 |
| Win | 9. | 12 June 2009 | Open de Marseille, France | Clay | (Italy) Tathiana Garbin | (Russia) Elena Bovina (Switzerland) Timea Bacsinszky | 6–7^{(4)}, 6–3, [10–7] |

== Sources ==
- María Emilia Salerni at CBS SportsLine.
- (in Spanish) Official website.
- (in Spanish) RedArgentina, Deportes.

| Preceded by Lina Krasnoroutskaya | ITF Junior World Champion; 2000 | Succeeded by Svetlana Kuznetsova |
