= 2016 Coupe Banque Nationale – Doubles =

Doubles
- 2016 Coupe Banque Nationale

Final
- Champions: (Czech Republic) Andrea Hlaváčková (Czech Republic) Lucie Hradecká
- Runners-up: (Russia) Alla Kudryavtseva (Russia) Alexandra Panova
- Score: 7–6^{(7–2)}, 7–6^{(7–2)}

Details
- Draw: 16
- Seeds: 4

Events
Singles	Doubles
← 2015 ·	Tournoi de Québec	· 2017 →

Barbora Krejčíková and An-Sophie Mestach were the defending champions, but Mestach decided not to participate this year. Krejčíková partnered with María Irigoyen, but lost in the semifinals to Alla Kudryavtseva and Alexandra Panova.

Andrea Hlaváčková and Lucie Hradecká won the title, defeating Kudryavtseva and Panova 7–6^{(7–2)}, 7–6^{(7–2)} in the final.

== Seeds ==
1. (Czech Republic) Andrea Hlaváčková / (Czech Republic) Lucie Hradecká (champions)
2. (Argentina) María Irigoyen / (Czech Republic) Barbora Krejčíková (semifinals)
3. (Russia) Alla Kudryavtseva / (Russia) Alexandra Panova (final)
4. (Belgium) Ysaline Bonaventure / (United States) Maria Sanchez (quarterfinals)

== Draw ==
=== Key ===
- Q = Qualifier
- WC = Wild card
- LL = Lucky loser
- Alt = Alternate
- SE = Special exempt
- PR = Protected ranking
- ITF = ITF entry
- JE = Junior exempt
- w/o = Walkover
- r = Retired
- d = Defaulted
- SR = Special ranking

First round
1	(Czech Republic) A Hlaváčková (Czech Republic) L Hradecká	6	6
(United States) J Loeb (Canada) C Zhao	2	0
(United Kingdom) N Broady (United States) S Marand	1	7^{7}	[10]
WC	(Canada) F Abanda (Russia) E Bovina	6	6^{3}	[12]
4	(Belgium) Y Bonaventure (United States) M Sanchez	6	7^{7}
(United States) J Cako (United States) D Lao	3	6^{3}
(Luxembourg) M Minella (Switzerland) A Sadiković	5	4
(Paraguay) V Cepede Royg (Bulgaria) E Kostova	7	6
(United States) A Weinhold (United States) C Whoriskey	6	7^{7}
(Mexico) AS Sánchez (Romania) PM Țig	4	6^{1}
WC	(Canada) E Bouchard (United States) J Pegula	4	4
3	(Russia) A Kudryavtseva (Russia) A Panova	6	6
(Germany) A Beck (Russia) E Rodina	4	6	[11]
(Serbia) J Jakšić (Czech Republic) B Štefková	6	2	[13]
(France) A Hesse (Poland) P Kania	3	3
2	(Argentina) M Irigoyen (Czech Republic) B Krejčíková	6	6

Quarterfinals
1	(Czech Republic) A Hlaváčková (Czech Republic) L Hradecká	6	6^{4}	[10]
WC	(Canada) F Abanda (Russia) E Bovina	4	7^{7}	[5]
4	(Belgium) Y Bonaventure (United States) M Sanchez	6	2	[8]
(Paraguay) V Cepede Royg (Bulgaria) E Kostova	2	6	[10]
(United States) A Weinhold (United States) C Whoriskey	7^{7}	2	[7]
3	(Russia) A Kudryavtseva (Russia) A Panova	6^{1}	6	[10]
(Serbia) J Jakšić (Czech Republic) B Štefková	4	4
2	(Argentina) M Irigoyen (Czech Republic) B Krejčíková	6	6

Semifinals
1	(Czech Republic) A Hlaváčková (Czech Republic) L Hradecká	6	6
(Paraguay) V Cepede Royg (Bulgaria) E Kostova	4	2
3	(Russia) A Kudryavtseva (Russia) A Panova	6	6
2	(Argentina) M Irigoyen (Czech Republic) B Krejčíková	4	4

Final
1	(Czech Republic) A Hlaváčková (Czech Republic) L Hradecká	7^{7}	7^{7}
3	(Russia) A Kudryavtseva (Russia) A Panova	6^{2}	6^{2}
