= 2016 Coupe Banque Nationale =

- Date: September 12–18
- Edition: 24th
- Category: WTA International
- Draw: 32S (24Q) / 16D (0Q)
- Prize money: US$250,000
- Surface: Carpet – indoors
- Location: Quebec City, Canada
- Venue: PEPS de l'Université Laval

Champions

Singles
- (France) Océane Dodin

Doubles
- (Czech Republic) Andrea Hlaváčková / (Czech Republic) Lucie Hradecká
← 2015 ·	Tournoi de Québec	· 2017 →

The 2016 Coupe Banque Nationale was a women's tennis tournament played on indoor carpet courts. It was the 24th edition of the Tournoi de Québec and part of the WTA International tournaments of the 2016 WTA Tour. It took place at the PEPS de l'Université Laval in Quebec City, Canada, from September 12 through September 18, 2016. Unseeded Océane Dodin won the singles title.

== Finals ==
=== Singles ===
(France) Océane Dodin defeated (United States) Lauren Davis, 6–4, 6–3

- It was Dodin's only singles title of the year and the 1st of her career.

=== Doubles ===
(Czech Republic) Andrea Hlaváčková / (Czech Republic) Lucie Hradecká defeated (Russia) Alla Kudryavtseva / (Russia) Alexandra Panova, 7–6^{(7–2)}, 7–6^{(7–2)}

== Points and prize money ==
=== Point distribution ===
Event	W	F	SF	QF	Round of 16	Round of 32	Q	Q2	Q1
Singles	280	180	110	60	30	1	18	12	1
Doubles	280	180	110	60	1	—	—	—	—

=== Prize money ===
Event	W	F	SF	QF	Round of 16	Round of 32^{*}	Q2	Q1
Singles	$43,000	$21,400	$11,500	$6,175	$3,400	$2,100	$1,020	$600
Doubles	$12,300	$6,400	$3,435	$1,820	$960	—	—	—
Doubles prize money per team

^* Qualifiers prize money is also the round of 32 prize money

== Singles main draw entrants ==
=== Seeds ===
Country	Player	Rank^{1}	Seed
CAN	Eugenie Bouchard	39	1
GER	Annika Beck	41	2
CRO	Mirjana Lučić-Baroni	57	3
GER	Julia Görges	64	4
GBR	Naomi Broady	82	5
GER	Mona Barthel	96	6
RUS	Evgeniya Rodina	98	7
USA	Samantha Crawford	101	8

- ^{1} Rankings are as of August 29, 2016

=== Other entrants ===
The following players received wildcards into the singles main draw:

- (Canada) Françoise Abanda
- (Canada) Aleksandra Wozniak
- (Canada) Carol Zhao

The following players received entry from the qualifying draw:

- (United States) Lauren Davis
- (France) Amandine Hesse
- (Czech Republic) Barbora Krejčíková
- (United States) Danielle Lao
- (United States) Jamie Loeb
- (Czech Republic) Tereza Martincová

The following player received entry as a lucky loser:

- (Czech Republic) Barbora Štefková

=== Withdrawals ===
Before the tournament

- (Hungary) Tímea Babos →replaced by (Bulgaria) Elitsa Kostova
- (Germany) Anna-Lena Friedsam →replaced by (United States) Jessica Pegula
- (United States) Bethanie Mattek-Sands →replaced by (Czech Republic) Barbora Štefková
- (Romania) Monica Niculescu →replaced by (United States) Catherine Bellis
- (Italy) Francesca Schiavone →replaced by (Russia) Ekaterina Alexandrova
- (United States) Anna Tatishvili →replaced by (Belgium) Ysaline Bonaventure

== Doubles main draw entrants ==
=== Seeds ===
Country	Player	Country	Player	Rank^{1}	Seed
CZE	Andrea Hlaváčková	CZE	Lucie Hradecká	20	1
ARG	María Irigoyen	CZE	Barbora Krejčíková	87	2
RUS	Alla Kudryavtseva	RUS	Alexandra Panova	101	3
BEL	Ysaline Bonaventure	USA	Maria Sanchez	181	4

- ^{1} Rankings are as of August 29, 2016

=== Other entrants ===
The following pairs received wildcards into the doubles main draw:

- (Canada) Françoise Abanda / (Russia) Elena Bovina
- (Canada) Eugenie Bouchard / (United States) Jessica Pegula
