= 2016 Coupe Banque Nationale – Singles =

Singles
- 2016 Coupe Banque Nationale

Final
- Champion: (France) Océane Dodin
- Runner-up: (United States) Lauren Davis
- Score: 6–4, 6–3

Details
- Draw: 32
- Seeds: 8

Events
Singles	Doubles
← 2015 ·	Tournoi de Québec	· 2017 →

Océane Dodin defeated Lauren Davis in the final, 6–4, 6–3 to win the singles tennis title at the 2016 Coupe Banque Nationale. It was her first WTA Tour title.

Annika Beck was the defending champion, but lost in the first round to Barbora Štefková.

== Seeds ==
1. (Canada) Eugenie Bouchard (second round)
2. (Germany) Annika Beck (first round)
3. (Croatia) Mirjana Lučić-Baroni (first round)
4. (Germany) Julia Görges (first round)
5. (United Kingdom) Naomi Broady (first round)
6. (Germany) Mona Barthel (first round)
7. (Russia) Evgeniya Rodina (second round)
8. (United States) Samantha Crawford (second round)

== Draw ==
=== Key ===
- Q = Qualifier
- WC = Wild card
- LL = Lucky loser
- Alt = Alternate
- ITF = ITF entry
- PR = Protected ranking
- SR = Special ranking
- SE = Special exempt
- JE = Junior exempt
- JR = Junior Accelerator Programme entrant
- CO = College Accelerator Programme entrant
- NG = Next Gen Accelerator Program entrant
- w/o = Walkover
- r = Retired
- d = Defaulted

=== Finals ===
Semifinals
Q	(United States) Lauren Davis	6	6^{2}	6
Q	(Czech Republic) Tereza Martincová	3	7^{7}	2
(United States) Julia Boserup	4	6	2
(France) Océane Dodin	6	3	6

Final
Q	(United States) Lauren Davis	4	3
(France) Océane Dodin	6	6

=== Top half ===
First round
1	(Canada) E Bouchard	6	6
(Luxembourg) M Minella	3	4
(Russia) A Kudryavtseva	7	6
(Paraguay) V Cepede Royg	5	4
WC	(Canada) C Zhao	3	2
Q	(United States) L Davis	6	6
(Belgium) Y Bonaventure	6^{5}	7^{7}	4
8	(United States) S Crawford	7^{7}	6^{4}	6
4	(Germany) J Görges	4	6^{1}
(Russia) E Alexandrova	6	7^{7}
Q	(Czech Republic) T Martincová	4	7	6
Q	(Czech Republic) B Krejčíková	6	5	4
WC	(Canada) A Wozniak	3	6	2
(United States) J Pegula	6	3	6
WC	(Canada) F Abanda	7^{9}	6
6	(Germany) M Barthel	6^{7}	4

Second round
1	(Canada) E Bouchard	2	3
(Russia) A Kudryavtseva	6	6
Q	(United States) L Davis	6	6
8	(United States) S Crawford	4	1
(Russia) E Alexandrova	4	6	4
Q	(Czech Republic) T Martincová	6	1	6
(United States) J Pegula	7^{7}	7
WC	(Canada) F Abanda	6^{2}	5

Quarterfinals
(Russia) A Kudryavtseva	3	6^{4}
Q	(United States) L Davis	6	7^{7}
Q	(Czech Republic) T Martincová	6	7^{9}
(United States) J Pegula	3	6^{7}

Semifinals
Q	(United States) L Davis	6	6^{2}	6
Q	(Czech Republic) T Martincová	3	7^{7}	2

=== Bottom half ===
First round
7	(Russia) E Rodina	6	6
Q	(United States) J Loeb	2	2
(Switzerland) A Sadiković	1	3
(United States) J Boserup	6	6
(United States) C Bellis	6	6
Q	(France) A Hesse	3	2
Q	(United States) D Lao	6	6
3	(Croatia) M Lučić-Baroni	4	2
5	(United Kingdom) N Broady	6	4	4
(France) O Dodin	2	6	6
(United States) S Vickery	7^{7}	6^{3}	7^{9}
(Romania) PM Țig	6^{5}	7^{7}	6^{7}
(Bulgaria) E Kostova	1	2
(Belgium) A Van Uytvanck	6	6
LL	(Czech Republic) B Štefková	2	7	6
2	(Germany) A Beck	6	5	3

Second round
7	(Russia) E Rodina	4	3
(United States) J Boserup	6	6
(United States) C Bellis	6	4	6
Q	(United States) D Lao	4	6	3
(France) O Dodin	6	6
(United States) S Vickery	4	4
(Belgium) A Van Uytvanck	6	6
LL	(Czech Republic) B Štefková	4	3

Quarterfinals
(United States) J Boserup	7^{7}	6
(United States) C Bellis	6^{0}	4
(France) O Dodin	6	6
(Belgium) A Van Uytvanck	2	4

Semifinals
(United States) J Boserup	4	6	2
(France) O Dodin	6	3	6

== Qualifying ==
=== Seeds ===
1. (United States) Lauren Davis (qualified)
2. (France) Amandine Hesse (qualified)
3. (Czech Republic) Barbora Štefková (qualifying competition, lucky loser)
4. (Czech Republic) Lucie Hradecká (qualifying competition)
5. (Serbia) Jovana Jakšić (qualifying competition)
6. (Russia) Alexandra Panova (qualifying competition)
7. (Japan) Mayo Hibi (qualifying competition)
8. (United States) Robin Anderson (first round)
9. (Poland) Paula Kania (qualifying competition)
10. (Bulgaria) Sesil Karatantcheva (first round)
11. (United States) Jamie Loeb (qualified)
12. (Czech Republic) Tereza Martincová (qualified)

=== Qualifiers ===
1. (United States) Lauren Davis
2. (France) Amandine Hesse
3. (Czech Republic) Barbora Krejčíková
4. (United States) Jamie Loeb
5. (United States) Danielle Lao
6. (Czech Republic) Tereza Martincová

=== Lucky losers ===
1. (Czech Republic) Barbora Štefková

=== Qualifying draw ===
==== First qualifier ====
First round
1	(United States) Lauren Davis	6	6
(Czech Republic) Marie Bouzková	4	3
(United States) Sanaz Marand	6	3	3
7	(Japan) Mayo Hibi	3	6	6

Qualifying competition
1	(United States) Lauren Davis	6	6
7	(Japan) Mayo Hibi	1	3

==== Second qualifier ====
First round
2	(France) Amandine Hesse	6	7^{7}
WC	(Russia) Elena Bovina	4	6^{3}
(Czech Republic) Andrea Hlaváčková	4	1
9	(Poland) Paula Kania	6	6

Qualifying competition
2	(France) Amandine Hesse	2	6	7
9	(Poland) Paula Kania	6	4	5

==== Third qualifier ====
First round
3	(Czech Republic) Barbora Štefková	6	6
WC	(Canada) Catherine Leduc	1	4
(Czech Republic) Barbora Krejčíková	6	6
8	(United States) Robin Anderson	3	2

Qualifying competition
3	(Czech Republic) Barbora Štefková	4	1
(Czech Republic) Barbora Krejčíková	6	6

==== Fourth qualifier ====
First round
4	(Czech Republic) Lucie Hradecká	6	6^{6}	6
(Mexico) Ana Sofía Sánchez	2	7^{8}	3
(United States) Jennifer Elie	3	6	4
11	(United States) Jamie Loeb	6	1	6

Qualifying competition
4	(Czech Republic) Lucie Hradecká	4	4
11	(United States) Jamie Loeb	6	6

==== Fifth qualifier ====
First round
5	(Serbia) Jovana Jakšić	6	6
WC	(Canada) Mireille Moreau	1	1
(United States) Danielle Lao	2	6	6
10	(Bulgaria) Sesil Karatantcheva	6	2	2

Qualifying competition
5	(Serbia) Jovana Jakšić	2	6^{4}
(United States) Danielle Lao	6	7^{7}

==== Sixth qualifier ====
First round
6	(Russia) Alexandra Panova	7^{7}	6
(United States) Maria Sanchez	6^{5}	2
WC	(Canada) Charlotte Robillard-Millette	4	1
12	(Czech Republic) Tereza Martincová	6	6

Qualifying competition
6	(Russia) Alexandra Panova	6^{2}	6^{4}
12	(Czech Republic) Tereza Martincová	7^{7}	7^{7}
