= 2017 Coupe Banque Nationale – Doubles =

Doubles
- 2017 Coupe Banque Nationale

Final
- Champions: (Hungary) Tímea Babos (Czech Republic) Andrea Hlaváčková
- Runners-up: (Canada) Bianca Andreescu (Canada) Carson Branstine
- Score: 6–3, 6–1

Events
Singles	Doubles
← 2016 ·	Tournoi de Québec	· 2018 →

Andrea Hlaváčková and Lucie Hradecká were the defending champions, but decided not to compete together. Hradecká partnered with Barbora Krejčíková, but lost in the quarterfinals to Bianca Andreescu and Carson Branstine. Hlaváčková partnered with Tímea Babos and successfully defended her title, defeating Andreescu and Branstine 6–3, 6–1 in the final.

== Seeds ==
1. (Hungary) Tímea Babos / (Czech Republic) Andrea Hlaváčková (champions)
2. (Czech Republic) Lucie Hradecká / (Czech Republic) Barbora Krejčíková (quarterfinals)
3. (Switzerland) Xenia Knoll / (Russia) Alla Kudryavtseva (first round, retired)
4. (United Kingdom) Naomi Broady / (United States) Asia Muhammad (quarterfinals)

== Draw ==
=== Key ===
- Q = Qualifier
- WC = Wild card
- LL = Lucky loser
- Alt = Alternate
- SE = Special exempt
- PR = Protected ranking
- ITF = ITF entry
- JE = Junior exempt
- w/o = Walkover
- r = Retired
- d = Defaulted
- SR = Special ranking

First round
1	(Hungary) T Babos (Czech Republic) A Hlaváčková	6	6
Alt	(United States) UM Arconada (United States) C Dolehide	2	2
(United States) D Krawczyk (United States) J Loeb	7	6
(United States) T Townsend (Canada) C Zhao	5	1
4	(United Kingdom) N Broady (United States) A Muhammad	6	7^{8}
(New Zealand) M Erakovic (Israel) J Glushko	1	6^{6}
(Argentina) M Irigoyen (Italy) C Rosatello	4	6	[10]
(Switzerland) V Golubic (Switzerland) A Sadiković	6	4	[3]
(United States) A Tatishvili (United States) S Vickery	3	6^{5}
(United States) K Christian (Mexico) G Olmos	6	7^{7}
(United States) I Falconi (Hungary) F Stollár	2
3	(Switzerland) X Knoll (Russia) A Kudryavtseva	1^{r}
(Chile) A Guarachi (United States) A Weinhold	3	4
WC	(Canada) B Andreescu (Canada) C Branstine	6	6
(United States) S Kenin (United States) V Lepchenko	4	4
2	(Czech Republic) L Hradecká (Czech Republic) B Krejčíková	6	6

Quarterfinals
1	(Hungary) T Babos (Czech Republic) A Hlaváčková	6	6
(United States) D Krawczyk (United States) J Loeb	3	3
4	(United Kingdom) N Broady (United States) A Muhammad	6^{5}	6^{6}
(Argentina) M Irigoyen (Italy) C Rosatello	7^{7}	7^{8}
(United States) K Christian (Mexico) G Olmos	6^{2}	3
(United States) I Falconi (Hungary) F Stollár	7^{7}	6
WC	(Canada) B Andreescu (Canada) C Branstine	4	6	[10]
2	(Czech Republic) L Hradecká (Czech Republic) B Krejčíková	6	3	[7]

Semifinals
1	(Hungary) T Babos (Czech Republic) A Hlaváčková	6	6
(Argentina) M Irigoyen (Italy) C Rosatello	3	2
(United States) I Falconi (Hungary) F Stollár	6^{6}	4
WC	(Canada) B Andreescu (Canada) C Branstine	7^{8}	6

Final
1	(Hungary) T Babos (Czech Republic) A Hlaváčková	6	6
WC	(Canada) B Andreescu (Canada) C Branstine	3	1
