= 2017 Coupe Banque Nationale =

- Date: September 11–17
- Edition: 25th
- Category: WTA International
- Draw: 32S (24Q) / 16D (0Q)
- Prize money: US$250,000
- Surface: Carpet – indoors
- Location: Quebec City, Canada
- Venue: PEPS de l'Université Laval

Champions

Singles
- (Belgium) Alison Van Uytvanck

Doubles
- (Hungary) Tímea Babos / (Czech Republic) Andrea Hlaváčková
← 2016 ·	Tournoi de Québec	· 2018 →

The 2017 Coupe Banque Nationale was a women's tennis tournament played on indoor carpet courts. It was the 25th edition of the Tournoi de Québec and part of the WTA International tournaments of the 2017 WTA Tour. It took place at the PEPS de l'Université Laval in Quebec City, Canada, from September 11 through September 17, 2017. Seventh-seeded Alison Van Uytvanck won the singles title.

== Finals ==
=== Singles ===
- (Belgium) Alison Van Uytvanck defeated (Hungary) Tímea Babos, 5–7, 6–4, 6–1

=== Doubles ===
- (Hungary) Tímea Babos / (Czech Republic) Andrea Hlaváčková defeated (Canada) Bianca Andreescu / (Canada) Carson Branstine, 6–3, 6–1

== Points and prize money ==
=== Point distribution ===
Event	W	F	SF	QF	Round of 16	Round of 32	Q	Q2	Q1
Singles	280	180	110	60	30	1	18	12	1
Doubles	280	180	110	60	1	—	—	—	—

=== Prize money ===
Event	W	F	SF	QF	Round of 16	Round of 32^{*}	Q2	Q1
Singles	$43,000	$21,400	$11,500	$6,175	$3,400	$2,100	$1,020	$600
Doubles	$12,300	$6,400	$3,435	$1,820	$960	—	—	—
Doubles prize money per team

^* Qualifiers prize money is also the round of 32 prize money

== Singles main draw entrants ==
=== Seeds ===
Country	Player	Rank^{1}	Seed
CZE	Lucie Šafářová	37	1
FRA	Océane Dodin	48	2
HUN	Tímea Babos	59	3
GER	Tatjana Maria	61	4
USA	Varvara Lepchenko	64	5
USA	Jennifer Brady	91	6
BEL	Alison Van Uytvanck	97	7
SUI	Viktorija Golubic	104	8

- ^{1} Rankings are as of August 28, 2017

=== Other entrants ===
The following players received wildcards into the singles main draw:

- (Australia) Destanee Aiava
- (Canada) Aleksandra Wozniak
- (Canada) Carol Zhao

The following players entered the singles main draw with a protected ranking:

- (United States) Jessica Pegula
- (United States) Anna Tatishvili

The following players received entry from the qualifying draw:

- (Canada) Gabriela Dabrowski
- (United States) Caroline Dolehide
- (Czech Republic) Andrea Hlaváčková
- (Russia) Alla Kudryavtseva
- (Canada) Charlotte Robillard-Millette
- (Hungary) Fanny Stollár

=== Withdrawals ===
Before the tournament

- (Romania) Ana Bogdan →replaced by (United States) Sofia Kenin
- (United States) Julia Boserup →replaced by (United States) Jamie Loeb
- (Canada) Eugenie Bouchard →replaced by (New Zealand) Marina Erakovic
- (United States) Kayla Day →replaced by (Czech Republic) Lucie Hradecká
- (Italy) Camila Giorgi →replaced by (United States) Grace Min
- (Romania) Patricia Maria Țig →replaced by (United States) Sachia Vickery
- (United Kingdom) Heather Watson →replaced by (United States) Asia Muhammad

=== Retirements ===
- (France) Océane Dodin (dizziness)

== Doubles main draw entrants ==
=== Seeds ===
Country	Player	Country	Player	Rank^{1}	Seed
HUN	Tímea Babos	CZE	Andrea Hlaváčková	25	1
CZE	Lucie Hradecká	CZE	Barbora Krejčíková	66	2
SUI	Xenia Knoll	RUS	Alla Kudryavtseva	138	3
GBR	Naomi Broady	USA	Asia Muhammad	140	4

- ^{1} Rankings are as of August 28, 2017

=== Other entrants ===
The following pairs received wildcards into the doubles main draw:

- (Canada) Bianca Andreescu / (Canada) Carson Branstine
- (United States) Jessica Pegula / (Canada) Charlotte Robillard-Millette

The following pair received entry as alternates:

- (United States) Usue Maitane Arconada / (United States) Caroline Dolehide

=== Withdrawals ===
Before the tournament

- (United States) Jessica Pegula

=== Retirements ===
- (Switzerland) Xenia Knoll (left hand injury)
