= 2017 Coupe Banque Nationale – Singles =

Singles
- 2017 Coupe Banque Nationale

Final
- Champion: (Belgium) Alison Van Uytvanck
- Runner-up: (Hungary) Tímea Babos
- Score: 5–7, 6–4, 6–1

Events
Singles	Doubles
← 2016 ·	Tournoi de Québec	· 2018 →

Océane Dodin was the defending champion, but withdrew from her second round match due to dizziness.

Alison Van Uytvanck won her maiden WTA singles title, defeating Tímea Babos 5–7, 6–4, 6–1 in the final.

== Seeds ==
1. (Czech Republic) Lucie Šafářová (semifinals)
2. (France) Océane Dodin (second round, withdrew due to dizziness)
3. (Hungary) Tímea Babos (final)
4. (Germany) Tatjana Maria (semifinals)
5. (United States) Varvara Lepchenko (second round)
6. (United States) Jennifer Brady (first round)
7. (Belgium) Alison Van Uytvanck (champion)
8. (Switzerland) Viktorija Golubic (second round)

== Draw ==
=== Key ===
- Q = Qualifier
- WC = Wild card
- LL = Lucky loser
- Alt = Alternate
- ITF = ITF entry
- PR = Protected ranking
- SR = Special ranking
- SE = Special exempt
- JE = Junior exempt
- JR = Junior Accelerator Programme entrant
- CO = College Accelerator Programme entrant
- NG = Next Gen Accelerator Program entrant
- w/o = Walkover
- r = Retired
- d = Defaulted

=== Finals ===
Semifinals
1	(Czech Republic) Lucie Šafářová	6^{8}	4
3	(Hungary) Tímea Babos	7^{10}	6
4	(Germany) Tatjana Maria	1	2
7	(Belgium) Alison Van Uytvanck	6	6

Final
3	(Hungary) Tímea Babos	7	4	1
7	(Belgium) Alison Van Uytvanck	5	6	6

=== Top half ===
First round
1	(Czech Republic) L Šafářová	6	6
PR	(United States) A Tatishvili	0	1
(United States) S Kenin	5	6	6
(Czech Republic) T Martincová	7	4	3
Q	(Czech Republic) A Hlaváčková	1	3
(Czech Republic) L Hradecká	6	6
(Canada) B Andreescu	6	6
6	(United States) J Brady	3	2
3	(Hungary) T Babos	7^{7}	5	6
(United States) J Loeb	6^{4}	7	2
WC	(Australia) D Aiava	4	6	3
(United Kingdom) N Broady	6	3	6
(United States) A Muhammad	4	5
(Canada) F Abanda	6	7
WC	(Canada) A Wozniak	1	6	1
5	(United States) V Lepchenko	6	2	6

Second round
1	(Czech Republic) L Šafářová	6	6
(United States) S Kenin	4	3
(Czech Republic) L Hradecká	2	6	7
(Canada) B Andreescu	6	2	5
3	(Hungary) T Babos	6	5	6
(United Kingdom) N Broady	2	7	2
(Canada) F Abanda	5	7	6
5	(United States) V Lepchenko	7	5	4

Quarterfinals
1	(Czech Republic) L Šafářová	6	7
(Czech Republic) L Hradecká	4	5
3	(Hungary) T Babos	6	6
(Canada) F Abanda	3	2

Semifinals
1	(Czech Republic) L Šafářová	6^{8}	4
3	(Hungary) T Babos	7^{10}	6

=== Bottom half ===
First round
8	(Switzerland) V Golubic	1	7	6
(Czech Republic) B Krejčíková	6	5	4
(United States) T Townsend	5	0
(United States) S Vickery	7	6
PR	(United States) J Pegula	6	4	0
(United States) G Min	4	6	6
Q	(Hungary) F Stollár	2	6^{4}
4	(Germany) T Maria	6	7^{7}
7	(Belgium) A Van Uytvanck	4	6	7^{7}
WC	(Canada) C Zhao	6	2	6^{1}
(New Zealand) M Erakovic	6	6
Q	(Russia) A Kudryavtseva	4	1
Q	(Canada) C Robillard-Millette	3	2
Q	(United States) C Dolehide	6	6
Q	(Canada) G Dabrowski	7	5	4
2	(France) O Dodin	5	7	6

Second round
8	(Switzerland) V Golubic	6	3	4
(United States) S Vickery	2	6	6
(United States) G Min	1	1
4	(Germany) T Maria	6	6
7	(Belgium) A Van Uytvanck	6	7^{7}
(New Zealand) M Erakovic	4	6^{4}
Q	(United States) C Dolehide	w/o
2	(France) O Dodin

Quarterfinals
(United States) S Vickery	1	3
4	(Germany) T Maria	6	6
7	(Belgium) A Van Uytvanck	6	6
Q	(United States) C Dolehide	2	2

Semifinals
4	(Germany) T Maria	1	2
7	(Belgium) A Van Uytvanck	6	6

== Qualifying ==
=== Seeds ===
1. (United States) Caroline Dolehide (qualified)
2. (Switzerland) Conny Perrin (qualifying competition)
3. (United States) Irina Falconi (qualifying competition)
4. (Croatia) Ajla Tomljanović (qualifying competition)
5. (Hungary) Fanny Stollár (qualified)
6. (United States) Usue Maitane Arconada (qualifying competition)
7. (Italy) Camilla Rosatello (first round)
8. (Israel) Julia Glushko (first round)
9. (Switzerland) Amra Sadiković (first round)
10. (Mexico) Victoria Rodríguez (qualifying competition)
11. (Israel) Deniz Khazaniuk (qualifying competition)
12. (United States) Claire Liu (first round)

=== Qualifiers ===
1. (United States) Caroline Dolehide
2. (Canada) Charlotte Robillard-Millette
3. (Canada) Gabriela Dabrowski
4. (Russia) Alla Kudryavtseva
5. (Hungary) Fanny Stollár
6. (Czech Republic) Andrea Hlaváčková

=== Qualifying draw ===
==== First qualifier ====
First round
1	(United States) Caroline Dolehide	6^{6}	6	6
(Chile) Alexa Guarachi	7^{8}	0	1
(United States) Kaitlyn Christian	6^{3}	4
10	(Mexico) Victoria Rodríguez	7^{7}	6

Qualifying competition
1	(United States) Caroline Dolehide	6	6
10	(Mexico) Victoria Rodríguez	4	2

==== Second qualifier ====
First round
2	(Switzerland) Conny Perrin	4	7	7
(Mexico) Giuliana Olmos	6	5	5
(Canada) Charlotte Robillard-Millette	7^{7}	6
7	(Italy) Camilla Rosatello	6^{4}	2

Qualifying competition
2	(Switzerland) Conny Perrin	7^{8}	6^{7}	2
(Canada) Charlotte Robillard-Millette	6^{6}	7^{9}	6

==== Third qualifier ====
First round
3	(United States) Irina Falconi	6	6
WC	(Canada) Mireille Moreau	0	0
(Canada) Gabriela Dabrowski	6	7
12	(United States) Claire Liu	3	5

Qualifying competition
3	(United States) Irina Falconi	6^{5}	7^{7}	3
(Canada) Gabriela Dabrowski	7^{7}	6^{4}	6

==== Fourth qualifier ====
First round
4	(Croatia) Ajla Tomljanović	3	6	6
WC	(Canada) Carson Branstine	6	1	0
(Russia) Alla Kudryavtseva	7^{8}	6
8	(Israel) Julia Glushko	6^{6}	3

Qualifying competition
4	(Croatia) Ajla Tomljanović	2	1
(Russia) Alla Kudryavtseva	6	6

==== Fifth qualifier ====
First round
5	(Hungary) Fanny Stollár	6	6
WC	(Canada) Catherine Leduc	0	3
WC	(Canada) Petra Januskova	4	0
11	(Israel) Deniz Khazaniuk	6	6

Qualifying competition
5	(Hungary) Fanny Stollár	6	6
11	(Israel) Deniz Khazaniuk	1	4

==== Sixth qualifier ====
First round
6	(United States) Usue Maitane Arconada	7	5	6
(United Kingdom) Tara Moore	5	7	3
(Czech Republic) Andrea Hlaváčková	7^{7}	6
9	(Switzerland) Amra Sadiković	6^{5}	4

Qualifying competition
6	(United States) Usue Maitane Arconada	1	2
(Czech Republic) Andrea Hlaváčková	6	6
