= 2015 Coupe Banque Nationale =

- Date: September 14–20
- Edition: 23rd
- Category: WTA International
- Draw: 32S (24Q) / 16D (0Q)
- Prize money: US$250,000
- Surface: Carpet – indoors
- Location: Quebec City, Canada
- Venue: PEPS de l'Université Laval

Champions

Singles
- (Germany) Annika Beck

Doubles
- (Czech Republic) Barbora Krejčíková / (Belgium) An-Sophie Mestach
- Tournoi de Québec

The 2015 Coupe Banque Nationale was a women's tennis tournament played on indoor carpet courts. It was the 23rd edition of the Tournoi de Québec and part of the WTA International tournaments of the 2015 WTA Tour. It took place at the PEPS de l'Université Laval in Quebec City, Canada, from September 14 through September 20, 2015. Fifth-seeded Annika Beck won the singles title.

== Finals ==
=== Singles ===
(Germany) Annika Beck defeated (Latvia) Jeļena Ostapenko, 6–2, 6–2

- It was Beck's only singles title of the year and the 2nd and last of her career.

=== Doubles ===
(Czech Republic) Barbora Krejčíková / (Belgium) An-Sophie Mestach defeated (Argentina) María Irigoyen / (Poland) Paula Kania, 4–6, 6–3, [12–10]

== Points and prize money ==
=== Point distribution ===
| Event | W | F | SF | QF | Round of 16 | Round of 32 | Q | Q2 | Q1 |
| Singles | 280 | 180 | 110 | 60 | 30 | 1 | 18 | 12 | 1 |
| Doubles | 280 | 180 | 110 | 60 | 1 | —N/a | —N/a | —N/a | —N/a |

=== Prize money ===
| Event | W | F | SF | QF | Round of 16 | Round of 32^{*} | Q2 | Q1 |
| Singles | $43,000 | $21,400 | $11,500 | $6,175 | $3,400 | $2,100 | $1,020 | $600 |
| Doubles | $12,300 | $6,400 | $3,435 | $1,820 | $960 | —N/a | —N/a | —N/a |
Doubles prize money per team

^* Qualifiers prize money is also the round of 32 prize money

== Singles main draw entrants ==
=== Seeds ===
| Country | Player | Rank^{1} | Seed |
|---|---|---|---|
| ~~USA~~ | ~~Madison Keys~~ | ~~19~~ | ~~1~~ |
| CRO | Mirjana Lučić-Baroni | 48 | 2 |
| GER | Mona Barthel | 53 | 3 |
| CZE | Lucie Hradecká | 56 | 4 |
| GER | Annika Beck | 62 | 5 |
| GER | Tatjana Maria | 66 | 6 |
| RUS | Evgeniya Rodina | 94 | 7 |
| BEL | An-Sophie Mestach | 102 | 8 |

- ^{1} Rankings are as of August 31, 2015

=== Other entrants ===
The following players received wildcards into the singles main draw:

- (Canada) Françoise Abanda
- (Canada) Sharon Fichman
- (United States) Madison Keys

The following player entered the singles main draw with a protected ranking:

- (Austria) Tamira Paszek

The following players received entry from the qualifying draw:

- (United States) Julia Boserup
- (United States) Samantha Crawford
- (France) Amandine Hesse
- (Ukraine) Kateryna Kozlova
- (Luxembourg) Mandy Minella
- (United States) Jessica Pegula

The following players received entry as lucky losers:

- (United Kingdom) Naomi Broady
- (Ukraine) Nadiia Kichenok

=== Withdrawals ===
Before the tournament

- (Russia) Vitalia Diatchenko →replaced by (Russia) Alla Kudryavtseva
- (United States) Edina Gallovits-Hall →replaced by (Poland) Paula Kania
- (Belarus) Olga Govortsova →replaced by (Czech Republic) Barbora Krejčíková
- (United States) Madison Keys →replaced by (Ukraine) Nadiia Kichenok
- (Czech Republic) Klára Koukalová →replaced by (United Kingdom) Naomi Broady
- (United States) Bethanie Mattek-Sands →replaced by (Argentina) María Irigoyen
- (Ukraine) Lesia Tsurenko →replaced by (United States) Sachia Vickery

=== Retirements ===
- (Canada) Françoise Abanda (neck injury)

== Doubles main draw entrants ==
=== Seeds ===
| Country | Player | Country | Player | Rank^{1} | Seed |
|---|---|---|---|---|---|
| UKR | Lyudmyla Kichenok | UKR | Nadiia Kichenok | 130 | 1 |
| GER | Tatjana Maria | USA | Anna Tatishvili | 173 | 2 |
| ARG | María Irigoyen | POL | Paula Kania | 173 | 3 |
| USA | Asia Muhammad | USA | Maria Sanchez | 185 | 4 |

- ^{1} Rankings are as of August 31, 2015

=== Other entrants ===
The following pair received wildcards into the doubles main draw:

- (Canada) Malika Auger-Aliassime / (Canada) Charlotte Petrick
