= 2018 Coupe Banque Nationale =

- Date: September 10–16
- Edition: 26th
- Category: WTA International
- Draw: 32S (24Q) / 16D (0Q)
- Prize money: US$250,000
- Surface: Carpet – indoors
- Location: Quebec City, Canada
- Venue: PEPS de l'Université Laval

Champions

Singles
- (France) Pauline Parmentier

Doubles
- (United States) Asia Muhammad / (United States) Maria Sanchez
← 2017 ·	Tournoi de Québec

The 2018 Coupe Banque Nationale is a women's tennis tournament played on indoor carpet courts. It was the 26th edition of the Tournoi de Québec and part of the WTA International tournaments of the 2018 WTA Tour. It took place at the PEPS de l'Université Laval in Quebec City, Canada, from September 10 through September 16, 2018. Eighth-seeded Pauline Parmentier won the singles title.

== Finals ==
=== Singles ===
(France) Pauline Parmentier defeated (United States) Jessica Pegula 7–5, 6–2

- It was Parmentier's 2nd and last singles title of the year and the 4th and last of her career.

=== Doubles ===
(United States) Asia Muhammad / (United States) Maria Sanchez defeated (Croatia) Darija Jurak / (Switzerland) Xenia Knoll 6–4, 6–3

== Points and prize money ==
=== Point distribution ===
Event	W	F	SF	QF	Round of 16	Round of 32	Q	Q2	Q1
Singles	280	180	110	60	30	1	18	12	1
Doubles	280	180	110	60	1	—	—	—	—

=== Prize money ===
Event	W	F	SF	QF	Round of 16	Round of 32	Q2	Q1
Singles	$43,000	$21,400	$11,500	$6,175	$3,400	$2,100	$1,020	$600
Doubles	$12,300	$6,400	$3,435	$1,820	$960	—	—	—
Doubles prize money per team

^* Qualifiers prize money is also the round of 32 prize money

== Singles main draw entrants ==
=== Seeds ===
Country	Player	Rank^{1}	Seed
BLR	Aryna Sabalenka	20	1
CRO	Petra Martić	47	2
PUR	Monica Puig	55	3
ROU	Monica Niculescu	62	4
USA	Sofia Kenin	65	5
CZE	Lucie Šafářová	69	6
GER	Tatjana Maria	70	7
FRA	Pauline Parmentier	71	8

- ^{1} Rankings are as of August 27, 2018

=== Other entrants ===
The following players received wildcards into the singles main draw:

- (Canada) Françoise Abanda
- (Canada) Leylah Annie Fernandez
- (Canada) Rebecca Marino

The following player entered the singles main draw with a protected ranking:

- (Belarus) Olga Govortsova

The following players received entry from the qualifying draw:

- (Czech Republic) Marie Bouzková
- (Canada) Gabriela Dabrowski
- (United States) Victoria Duval
- (Bulgaria) Sesil Karatantcheva
- (Czech Republic) Tereza Martincová
- (United States) Jessica Pegula

=== Withdrawals ===
Before the tournament

- (Russia) Anna Blinkova → replaced by (Russia) Veronika Kudermetova
- (United States) Danielle Collins → replaced by (United Kingdom) Naomi Broady
- (Serbia) Olga Danilović → replaced by (Tunisia) Ons Jabeur
- (Russia) Vitalia Diatchenko → replaced by (United States) Madison Brengle
- (Russia) Margarita Gasparyan → replaced by (Brazil) Beatriz Haddad Maia
- (Russia) Anastasia Pavlyuchenkova → replaced by (United Kingdom) Heather Watson
- (China) Peng Shuai → replaced by (Germany) Mona Barthel
- (United States) Sachia Vickery → replaced by (Spain) Georgina García Pérez

== Doubles main draw entrants ==
=== Seeds ===
Country	Player	Country	Player	Rank^{1}	Seed
USA	Kaitlyn Christian	USA	Sabrina Santamaria	108	1
CRO	Darija Jurak	SUI	Xenia Knoll	137	2
USA	Desirae Krawczyk	MEX	Giuliana Olmos	151	3
RUS	Natela Dzalamidze	RUS	Veronika Kudermetova	183	4

- ^{1} Rankings are as of August 20, 2018

=== Other entrants ===
The following pairs received wildcards into the doubles main draw:

- (Canada) Leylah Annie Fernandez / (Canada) Sharon Fichman
- (Canada) Carson Branstine / (Canada) Rebecca Marino
