= 2018 Coupe Banque Nationale – Singles =

Singles
- 2018 Coupe Banque Nationale

Final
- Champion: (France) Pauline Parmentier
- Runner-up: (United States) Jessica Pegula
- Score: 7–5, 6–2

Details
- Draw: 32
- Seeds: 8

Events
Singles	Doubles
← 2017 ·	Tournoi de Québec

Alison Van Uytvanck was the defending champion, but chose not to participate.

Pauline Parmentier won the title defeating Jessica Pegula in the final 7–5, 6–2.

== Seeds ==
1. (Belarus) Aryna Sabalenka (first round)
2. (Croatia) Petra Martić (quarterfinals)
3. (Puerto Rico) Monica Puig (quarterfinals)
4. (Romania) Monica Niculescu (first round)
5. (United States) Sofia Kenin (semifinals)
6. (Czech Republic) Lucie Šafářová (first round)
7. (Germany) Tatjana Maria (first round)
8. (France) Pauline Parmentier (champion)

== Draw ==
=== Key ===
- Q = Qualifier
- WC = Wild card
- LL = Lucky loser
- Alt = Alternate
- ITF = ITF entry
- PR = Protected ranking
- SR = Special ranking
- SE = Special exempt
- JE = Junior exempt
- JR = Junior Accelerator Programme entrant
- CO = College Accelerator Programme entrant
- NG = Next Gen Accelerator Program entrant
- w/o = Walkover
- r = Retired
- d = Defaulted

=== Finals ===
Semifinals
8	(France) Pauline Parmentier	5	6	7^{7}
(United Kingdom) Heather Watson	7	3	6^{5}
5	(United States) Sofia Kenin	6	2	4
Q	(United States) Jessica Pegula	4	6	6

Final
8	(France) Pauline Parmentier	7	6
Q	(United States) Jessica Pegula	5	2

=== Top half ===
First round
1	(Belarus) A Sabalenka	4	6^{5}
(United States) V Lepchenko	6	7^{7}
Q	(Czech Republic) M Bouzková	6	6
Q	(Bulgaria) S Karatantcheva	2	1
(Ukraine) D Yastremska	6	2	6^{1}
(United States) C McHale	2	6	7^{7}
(Russia) V Kudermetova	5	3
8	(France) P Parmentier	7	6
4	(Romania) M Niculescu	5	3
(United Kingdom) H Watson	7	6
WC	(Canada) LA Fernandez	6	7
Q	(Canada) G Dabrowski	3	5
(Russia) E Rodina	6	3	1
(Spain) G García Pérez	4	6	6
WC	(Canada) R Marino	6	6
7	(Germany) T Maria	2	2

Second round
(United States) V Lepchenko	6	1	6
Q	(Czech Republic) M Bouzková	1	6	3
(United States) C McHale	2	6	5
8	(France) P Parmentier	6	4	7
(United Kingdom) H Watson	6	7
WC	(Canada) LA Fernandez	4	5
(Spain) G García Pérez	7^{7}	2	4
WC	(Canada) R Marino	6^{3}	6	6

Quarterfinals
(United States) V Lepchenko	6^{7}	1
8	(France) P Parmentier	7^{9}	6
(United Kingdom) H Watson	6	6
WC	(Canada) R Marino	3	4

Semifinals
8	(France) P Parmentier	5	6	7^{7}
(United Kingdom) H Watson	7	3	6^{5}

=== Bottom half ===
First round
5	(United States) S Kenin	6	6
(Germany) M Barthel	3	4
WC	(Canada) F Abanda	4	6	6
Q	(Czech Republic) T Martincová	6	2	2
Q	(United States) V Duval	4	7^{7}	4
(United States) M Brengle	6	6^{2}	6
(Brazil) B Haddad Maia	2	3
3	(Puerto Rico) M Puig	6	6
6	(Czech Republic) L Šafářová	6^{4}	6	5
(Tunisia) O Jabeur	7^{7}	3	7
Q	(United States) J Pegula	6	7^{8}
(Czech Republic) Kr Plíšková	3	6^{6}
(United States) K Ahn	1	4
PR	(Belarus) O Govortsova	6	6
(United Kingdom) N Broady	1	1
2	(Croatia) P Martić	6	6

Second round
5	(United States) S Kenin	6	6
WC	(Canada) F Abanda	4	4
(United States) M Brengle	5	0^{r}
3	(Puerto Rico) M Puig	7	3
(Tunisia) O Jabeur	6^{3}	4
Q	(United States) J Pegula	7^{7}	6
PR	(Belarus) O Govortsova	0	2
2	(Croatia) P Martić	6	6

Quarterfinals
5	(United States) S Kenin	6	6
3	(Puerto Rico) M Puig	3	1
Q	(United States) J Pegula	6	7
2	(Croatia) P Martić	3	5

Semifinals
5	(United States) S Kenin	6	2	4
Q	(United States) J Pegula	4	6	6

== Qualifying ==
=== Seeds ===
1. (Slovenia) Dalila Jakupović (qualifying competition)
2. (Czech Republic) Marie Bouzková (qualified)
3. (Bulgaria) Sesil Karatantcheva (qualified)
4. (United States) Lauren Davis (qualifying competition)
5. (United States) Asia Muhammad (withdrew, still competing in Chicago)
6. (Czech Republic) Tereza Martincová (qualified)
7. (United States) Victoria Duval (qualified)
8. (United States) Jessica Pegula (qualified)
9. (Serbia) Jovana Jakšić (first round)
10. (United States) Maria Sanchez (withdrew, still competing in Chicago)
11. (United States) Emina Bektas (first round)
12. (United States) Maria Mateas (qualifying competition)

=== Qualifiers ===
1. (United States) Victoria Duval
2. (Czech Republic) Marie Bouzková
3. (Bulgaria) Sesil Karatantcheva
4. (United States) Jessica Pegula
5. (Canada) Gabriela Dabrowski
6. (Czech Republic) Tereza Martincová

=== Qualifying draw ===
==== First qualifier ====
First round
1	(Slovenia) Dalila Jakupović	6	6
(United States) Sophie Chang	1	1
(Russia) Nika Kukharchuk	2	2
7	(United States) Victoria Duval	6	6

Qualifying competition
1	(Slovenia) Dalila Jakupović	6	4	3
7	(United States) Victoria Duval	2	6	6

==== Second qualifier ====
First round
2	(Czech Republic) Marie Bouzková	6	7
WC	(Canada) Carson Branstine	2	5
WC	(Canada) Jada Bui	4	1
12	(United States) Maria Mateas	6	6

Qualifying competition
2	(Czech Republic) Marie Bouzková	6	6
12	(United States) Maria Mateas	3	2

==== Third qualifier ====
First round
3	(Bulgaria) Sesil Karatantcheva	1	6	7^{7}
PR	(Netherlands) Michaëlla Krajicek	6	3	6^{4}
(United States) Kayla Day	6^{5}	6	6
Alt	(United States) Sabrina Santamaria	7^{7}	4	3

Qualifying competition
3	(Bulgaria) Sesil Karatantcheva	6	2
(United States) Kayla Day	2	0^{r}

==== Fourth qualifier ====
First round
4	(United States) Lauren Davis	6	2	6
(United States) Amanda Rodgers	4	6	0
(United States) Jacqueline Cako	4	2
8	(United States) Jessica Pegula	6	6

Qualifying competition
4	(United States) Lauren Davis	4	6	2
8	(United States) Jessica Pegula	6	2	6

==== Fifth qualifier ====
First round
Alt	(United States) Jennifer Elie	7^{7}	6
WC	(Canada) Alexandra Vagramov	6^{5}	3
WC	(Canada) Gabriela Dabrowski	0	6	6
9	(Serbia) Jovana Jakšić	6	4	4

Qualifying competition
Alt	(United States) Jennifer Elie	1	6^{1}
WC	(Canada) Gabriela Dabrowski	6	7^{7}

==== Sixth qualifier ====
First round
6	(Czech Republic) Tereza Martincová	7	7
(Czech Republic) Lucie Hradecká	5	5
(Canada) Katherine Sebov	6	6
11	(United States) Emina Bektas	2	4

Qualifying competition
6	(Czech Republic) Tereza Martincová	6	6
(Canada) Katherine Sebov	2	0
