= 2018 Coupe Banque Nationale – Doubles =

Women's tennis tournament

Doubles
- 2018 Coupe Banque Nationale

Final
- Champions: (United States) Asia Muhammad (United States) Maria Sanchez
- Runners-up: (Croatia) Darija Jurak (Switzerland) Xenia Knoll
- Score: 6–4, 6–3

Details
- Draw: 16
- Seeds: 4

Events
Singles	Doubles
← 2017 ·	Tournoi de Québec

Tímea Babos and Andrea Sestini Hlaváčková were the defending champions, but neither player chose to defend their title.

Asia Muhammad and Maria Sanchez won the title defeating Darija Jurak and Xenia Knoll 6–4, 6–3 in the final.

== Seeds ==
1. (United States) Kaitlyn Christian / (United States) Sabrina Santamaria (first round)
2. (Croatia) Darija Jurak / (Switzerland) Xenia Knoll (final)
3. (United States) Desirae Krawczyk / (Mexico) Giuliana Olmos (semifinals)
4. (Russia) Natela Dzalamidze / (Russia) Veronika Kudermetova (semifinals)

== Draw ==
=== Key ===
- Q = Qualifier
- WC = Wild card
- LL = Lucky loser
- Alt = Alternate
- SE = Special exempt
- PR = Protected ranking
- ITF = ITF entry
- JE = Junior exempt
- w/o = Walkover
- r = Retired
- d = Defaulted
- SR = Special ranking

=== Draw ===
First round
1	(United States) K Christian (United States) S Santamaria	2	4
(Czech Republic) L Hradecká (Netherlands) M Krajicek	6	6
WC	(Canada) LA Fernandez (Canada) S Fichman	2	4
(United States) A Muhammad (United States) M Sanchez	6	6
3	(United States) D Krawczyk (Mexico) G Olmos	6	6
(Chinese Taipei) P-h Chen (Chinese Taipei) F-h Wu	3	1
(Indonesia) B Gumulya (Montenegro) A Veselinović	7^{7}	2	[7]
(United States) C McHale (Kazakhstan) G Voskoboeva	6^{5}	6	[10]
(United States) J Cako (Germany) N Geuer	6	4	[7]
(United Kingdom) N Broady (Czech Republic) Kr Plíšková	3	6	[10]
(Spain) G García Pérez (Brazil) B Haddad Maia	4	3
4	(Russia) N Dzalamidze (Russia) V Kudermetova	6	6
(United States) S Chang (United States) A Mueller	6	6
(United States) K Ahn (United Kingdom) H Watson	2	3
WC	(Canada) C Branstine (Canada) R Marino	7	2	[4]
2	(Croatia) D Jurak (Switzerland) X Knoll	5	6	[10]

Quarterfinals
(Czech Republic) L Hradecká (Netherlands) M Krajicek	5	6^{5}
(United States) A Muhammad (United States) M Sanchez	7	7^{7}
3	(United States) D Krawczyk (Mexico) G Olmos	6^{5}	6	[10]
(United States) C McHale (Kazakhstan) G Voskoboeva	7^{7}	3	[4]
(United Kingdom) N Broady (Czech Republic) Kr Plíšková	6	4	[7]
4	(Russia) N Dzalamidze (Russia) V Kudermetova	2	6	[10]
(United States) S Chang (United States) A Mueller	4	2
2	(Croatia) D Jurak (Switzerland) X Knoll	6	6

Semifinals
(United States) A Muhammad (United States) M Sanchez	3	6	[10]
3	(United States) D Krawczyk (Mexico) G Olmos	6	3	[7]
4	(Russia) N Dzalamidze (Russia) V Kudermetova	6	3	[6]
2	(Croatia) D Jurak (Switzerland) X Knoll	2	6	[10]

Final
(United States) A Muhammad (United States) M Sanchez	6	6
2	(Croatia) D Jurak (Switzerland) X Knoll	4	3
