= Pavel Motl =

Czech tennis player (born 1997)

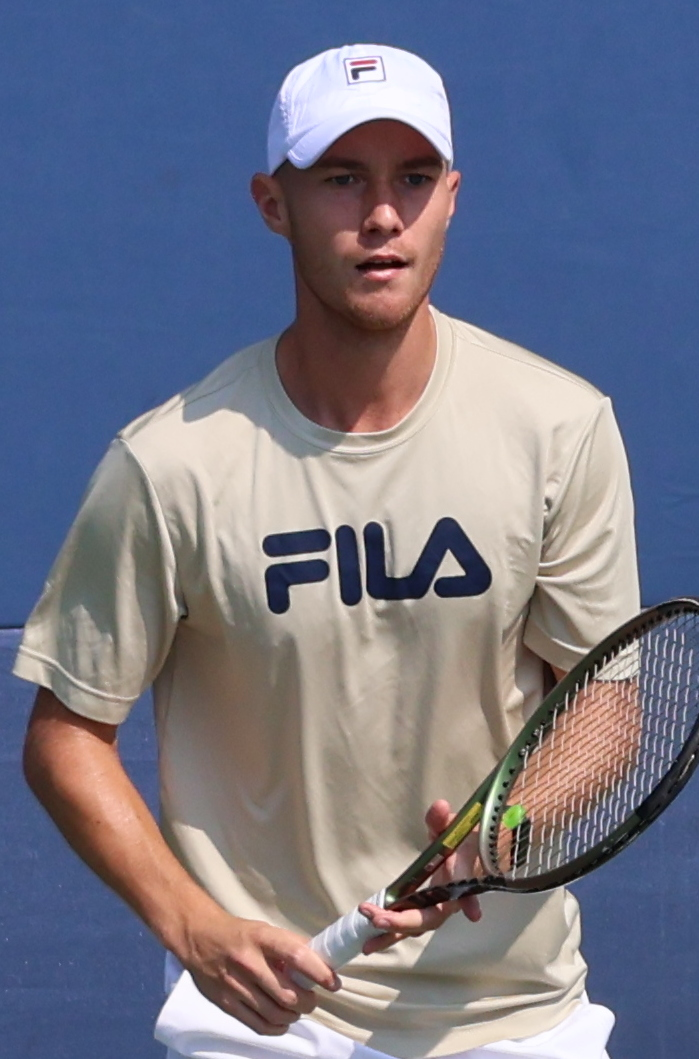
- Motl in 2024
- Country (sports): Czech Republic
- Born: 7 September 1997 (age 27)
- Height: 6 ft 0 in (183 cm)
- Plays: Right-handed (two-handed backhand)
- College: Middle Tennessee (2018–2023)
- Prize money: $2,053

Singles
- Highest ranking: No. 1,887 (7 March 2016)

Doubles
- Highest ranking: No. 1,067 (7 November 2016)

Pavel Motl (born 7 September 1997) is a Czech former tennis player known for working with Barbora Krejčíková. He played at the collegiate level at Middle Tennessee State University in the United States.

== Career ==
Motl was raised in the village of Prštice. He began playing tennis when he was ten years old. He went to high school in Ivančice and trained at TK Sparta Prague. He ranked as high as No. 101 as a junior on the ITF Junior Circuit, where he won one singles title and eight doubles titles. He played in qualifying draws on the ITF Men's World Tennis Tour beginning in 2015, earning his only ATP ranking point from one main draw win at a Futures tournament in Jablonec nad Nisou that year. He injured his wrist at the age of 19 and considered quitting the sport but recovered and went to play college tennis in the United States.

Motl attended Middle Tennessee State University, where he played for the Blue Raiders for five years and won four consecutive Conference USA championships from 2019 to 2023 (the tournament was not held in 2020). In his freshman season in 2018–19, Motl led the team in singles and doubles dual match wins mostly at court six and court three respectively. He won his singles match to clinch the program's first C-USA championship, earning a berth into the 2019 NCAA tournament for the first time in seven years, and was recognized with teammate Gonzalo Morell as the outstanding doubles pairing of the conference tournament. He was named second-team All-C-USA in singles and doubles as a freshman and sophomore.

Motl moved up to doubles court one as a sophomore, partnering Stijn Slump for most of the rest of his time at Middle Tennessee. They ranked as high as No. 20 nationally and received first-team All-C-USA honors during Motl's junior and senior years, when they moved down to court two. Motl was named the most outstanding singles player of his final conference tournament as a graduate student in 2023. He ended college with career records of 93–51 in singles and 103–55 in doubles.

Since leaving Middle Tennessee, Motl has traveled with countrywoman Barbora Krejčíková beginning at the Cincinnati Open in August 2023. They knew each other growing up and occasionally trained together over the years. Motl has said he is not Krejčíková's coach, though he is sometimes described as such and plays a role talking with her to prepare for matches.
