= 2015 Coupe Banque Nationale – Doubles =

Doubles
- 2015 Coupe Banque Nationale

Final
- Champions: (Czech Republic) Barbora Krejčíková (Belgium) An-Sophie Mestach
- Runners-up: (Argentina) María Irigoyen (Poland) Paula Kania
- Score: 4–6, 6–3, [12–10]

Details
- Draw: 16
- Seeds: 4

Events
Singles	Doubles
- Tournoi de Québec

Lucie Hradecká and Mirjana Lučić-Baroni were the defending champions, but lost in the quarterfinals to Barbora Krejčíková and An-Sophie Mestach.

Krejčíková and Mestach went on to win the title, defeating María Irigoyen and Paula Kania 4–6, 6–3, [12–10] in the final.

== Seeds ==
1. (Ukraine) Lyudmyla Kichenok / (Ukraine) Nadiia Kichenok (quarterfinals)
2. (Germany) Tatjana Maria / (United States) Anna Tatishvili (quarterfinals)
3. (Argentina) María Irigoyen / (Poland) Paula Kania (final)
4. (United States) Asia Muhammad / (United States) Maria Sanchez (first round)

== Draw ==
Key

- Q = Qualifier
- WC = Wild card
- LL = Lucky loser
- Alt = Alternate
- ITF = ITF entry
- PR = Protected ranking
- SR = Special ranking
- SE = Special exempt
- JE = Junior exempt
- JR = Junior Accelerator Programme entrant
- CO = College Accelerator Programme entrant
- NG = Next Gen Accelerator Program entrant
- w/o = Walkover
- r = Retired
- d = Defaulted

First round
1	(Ukraine) L Kichenok (Ukraine) N Kichenok	6	6
(United States) S Crawford (United States) S Vickery	3	2
(United Kingdom) N Broady (France) A Hesse	6	6
(United States) D Lao (United States) S Marand	4	4
3	(Argentina) M Irigoyen (Poland) P Kania	6	6
(United States) J Boserup (United States) N Gibbs	4	4
(United States) J Cako (United States) L Chirico	4	4
(Luxembourg) M Minella (Latvia) J Ostapenko	6	6
(Czech Republic) B Krejčíková (Belgium) A-S Mestach	6	6
WC	(Canada) M Auger-Aliassime (Canada) C Petrick	4	1
(Czech Republic) L Hradecká (Croatia) M Lučić-Baroni	6	6
4	(United States) A Muhammad (United States) M Sanchez	3	1
(France) J Coin (United States) J Pegula	6^{5}	7^{7}	[7]
(Germany) A Beck (Russia) E Rodina	7^{7}	6^{2}	[10]
(Canada) S Fichman (Canada) C Zhao	2	4
2	(Germany) T Maria (United States) A Tatishvili	6	6

Quarterfinals
1	(Ukraine) L Kichenok (Ukraine) N Kichenok	3	4
(United Kingdom) N Broady (France) A Hesse	6	6
3	(Argentina) M Irigoyen (Poland) P Kania	3	6	[10]
(Luxembourg) M Minella (Latvia) J Ostapenko	6	3	[4]
(Czech Republic) B Krejčíková (Belgium) A-S Mestach	7	6
(Czech Republic) L Hradecká (Croatia) M Lučić-Baroni	5	3
(Germany) A Beck (Russia) E Rodina	6	7
2	(Germany) T Maria (United States) A Tatishvili	0	5

Semifinals
(United Kingdom) N Broady (France) A Hesse	7	5	[6]
3	(Argentina) M Irigoyen (Poland) P Kania	5	7	[10]
(Czech Republic) B Krejčíková (Belgium) A-S Mestach	6	6
(Germany) A Beck (Russia) E Rodina	3	1

Final
3	(Argentina) M Irigoyen (Poland) P Kania	6	3	[10]
(Czech Republic) B Krejčíková (Belgium) A-S Mestach	4	6	[12]
