= 2015 Coupe Banque Nationale – Singles =

Singles
- 2015 Coupe Banque Nationale

Final
- Champion: (Germany) Annika Beck
- Runner-up: (Latvia) Jeļena Ostapenko
- Score: 6–2, 6–2

Details
- Draw: 32
- Seeds: 8

Events
Singles	Doubles
- Tournoi de Québec

Mirjana Lučić-Baroni was the defending champion, but lost in the semifinals to Annika Beck.

Beck went on to win the title, defeating Jeļena Ostapenko 6–2, 6–2 in the final.

== Seeds ==
1. (United States) Madison Keys (withdrew due to left wrist injury)
2. (Croatia) Mirjana Lučić-Baroni (semifinals)
3. (Germany) Mona Barthel (first round)
4. (Czech Republic) Lucie Hradecká (quarterfinals)
5. (Germany) Annika Beck (champion)
6. (Germany) Tatjana Maria (first round)
7. (Russia) Evgeniya Rodina (second round)
8. (Belgium) An-Sophie Mestach (first round)

== Draw ==
Key

- Q = Qualifier
- WC = Wild card
- LL = Lucky loser
- Alt = Alternate
- ITF = ITF entry
- PR = Protected ranking
- SR = Special ranking
- SE = Special exempt
- JE = Junior exempt
- JR = Junior Accelerator Programme entrant
- CO = College Accelerator Programme entrant
- NG = Next Gen Accelerator Program entrant
- w/o = Walkover
- r = Retired
- d = Defaulted

=== Finals ===
Semifinals
LL	(United Kingdom) Naomi Broady	4	2
(Latvia) Jeļena Ostapenko	6	6
5	(Germany) Annika Beck	6	2	6
2	(Croatia) Mirjana Lučić-Baroni	2	6	4

Final
(Latvia) Jeļena Ostapenko	2	2
5	(Germany) Annika Beck	6	6

=== Top half ===
First round
LL	(Ukraine) N Kichenok	2	4
(United States) A Tatishvili	6	6
(United States) L Chirico	7	4	6
Q	(United States) J Boserup	5	6	1
(Russia) A Kudryavtseva	3	6^{7}
LL	(United Kingdom) N Broady	6	7^{9}
(United States) A Glatch	1	6	6
6	(Germany) T Maria	6	4	1
3	(Germany) M Barthel	6^{6}	6	4
(Latvia) J Ostapenko	7^{8}	4	6
Q	(United States) J Pegula	1	7^{7}	7^{7}
(United States) N Gibbs	6	6^{2}	6^{4}
(Czech Republic) B Krejčíková	3	5
(Bulgaria) S Karatantcheva	6	7
(Poland) P Kania	6	6
8	(Belgium) A-S Mestach	4	3

Second round
(United States) A Tatishvili	6	3	6
(United States) L Chirico	2	6	4
LL	(United Kingdom) N Broady	6	6
(United States) A Glatch	4	2
(Latvia) J Ostapenko	3	6	7^{7}
Q	(United States) J Pegula	6	2	6^{3}
(Bulgaria) S Karatantcheva	3	3
(Poland) P Kania	6	6

Quarterfinals
(United States) A Tatishvili	6	5	3
LL	(United Kingdom) N Broady	3	7	6
(Latvia) J Ostapenko	6	6
(Poland) P Kania	0	1

Semifinals
LL	(United Kingdom) N Broady	4	2
(Latvia) J Ostapenko	6	6

=== Bottom half ===
First round
5	(Germany) A Beck	6	6
WC	(Canada) S Fichman	0	1
(Czech Republic) A Hlaváčková	7^{10}	6
(United States) S Rogers	6^{8}	0
Q	(France) A Hesse	6	6
(Argentina) M Irigoyen	3	2
(Croatia) D Vekić	2	4
4	(Czech Republic) L Hradecká	6	6
7	(Russia) E Rodina	6	6
(United States) S Vickery	2	2
Q	(Luxembourg) M Minella	2	1
Q	(United States) S Crawford	6	6
Q	(Ukraine) K Kozlova	1	1
PR	(Austria) T Paszek	6	6
WC	(Canada) F Abanda	3	1^{r}
2	(Croatia) M Lučić-Baroni	6	3

Second round
5	(Germany) A Beck	6	6
(Czech Republic) A Hlaváčková	4	4
Q	(France) A Hesse	6	3	4
4	(Czech Republic) L Hradecká	1	6	6
7	(Russia) E Rodina	3	3
Q	(United States) S Crawford	6	6
PR	(Austria) T Paszek	3	3
2	(Croatia) M Lučić-Baroni	6	6

Quarterfinals
5	(Germany) A Beck	6	6
4	(Czech Republic) L Hradecká	0	3
Q	(United States) S Crawford	6	4	1
2	(Croatia) M Lučić-Baroni	4	6	6

Semifinals
5	(Germany) A Beck	6	2	6
2	(Croatia) M Lučić-Baroni	2	6	4

== Qualifying ==
=== Seeds ===
1. (United Kingdom) Naomi Broady (qualifying competition, lucky loser)
2. (United States) Maria Sanchez (qualifying competition)
3. (France) Julie Coin (first round)
4. (France) Amandine Hesse (qualified)
5. (Ukraine) Kateryna Kozlova (qualified)
6. (United States) Julia Boserup (qualified)
7. (United States) Samantha Crawford (qualified)
8. (Luxembourg) Mandy Minella (qualified)
9. (Czech Republic) Kateřina Vaňková (first round)
10. (Ukraine) Nadiia Kichenok (qualifying competition, lucky loser)
11. (United States) Bernarda Pera (first round, retired)
12. (United States) Jessica Pegula (qualified)

=== Qualifiers ===
1. (United States) Jessica Pegula
2. (United States) Samantha Crawford
3. (Luxembourg) Mandy Minella
4. (France) Amandine Hesse
5. (Ukraine) Kateryna Kozlova
6. (United States) Julia Boserup

=== Lucky losers ===
1. (United Kingdom) Naomi Broady
2. (Ukraine) Nadiia Kichenok

=== Qualifying draw ===
==== First qualifier ====
First round
1	(United Kingdom) Naomi Broady	6	6^{3}	6
(United States) Melanie Oudin	3	7^{7}	3
(United States) Sanaz Marand	6	1	5
12	(United States) Jessica Pegula	3	6	7

Qualifying competition
1	(United Kingdom) Naomi Broady	6	3	4
12	(United States) Jessica Pegula	1	6	6

==== Second qualifier ====
First round
2	(United States) Maria Sanchez	6	6
WC	(Canada) Malika Auger-Aliassime	0	2
WC	(Canada) Marie-Ève Pelletier	0	1
7	(United States) Samantha Crawford	6	6

Qualifying competition
2	(United States) Maria Sanchez	6	4	6^{3}
7	(United States) Samantha Crawford	1	6	7^{7}

==== Third qualifier ====
First round
3	(France) Julie Coin	6^{3}	3
(United States) Danielle Lao	7^{7}	6
WC	(Canada) Aleksandra Wozniak	3	7	4
8	(Luxembourg) Mandy Minella	6	5	6

Qualifying competition
(United States) Danielle Lao	3	3
8	(Luxembourg) Mandy Minella	6	6

==== Fourth qualifier ====
First round
4	(France) Amandine Hesse	6	0	6
(United States) Jennifer Elie	2	6	1
(Ukraine) Lyudmyla Kichenok	6	1
11	(United States) Bernarda Pera	3	0^{r}

Qualifying competition
4	(France) Amandine Hesse	6	6
(Ukraine) Lyudmyla Kichenok	3	4

==== Fifth qualifier ====
First round
5	(Ukraine) Kateryna Kozlova	6	6
WC	(Canada) Charlotte Petrick	1	0
(United States) Jacqueline Cako	1	0
10	(Ukraine) Nadiia Kichenok	6	6

Qualifying competition
5	(Ukraine) Kateryna Kozlova	6	6
10	(Ukraine) Nadiia Kichenok	4	4

==== Sixth qualifier ====
First round
6	(United States) Julia Boserup	6	6
(Canada) Carol Zhao	2	3
(United States) Asia Muhammad	7^{7}	6
9	(Czech Republic) Kateřina Vaňková	6^{3}	1

Qualifying competition
6	(United States) Julia Boserup	6	7^{7}
(United States) Asia Muhammad	1	6^{3}
