= Barbora Krejčíková =

Czech tennis player (born 1995)

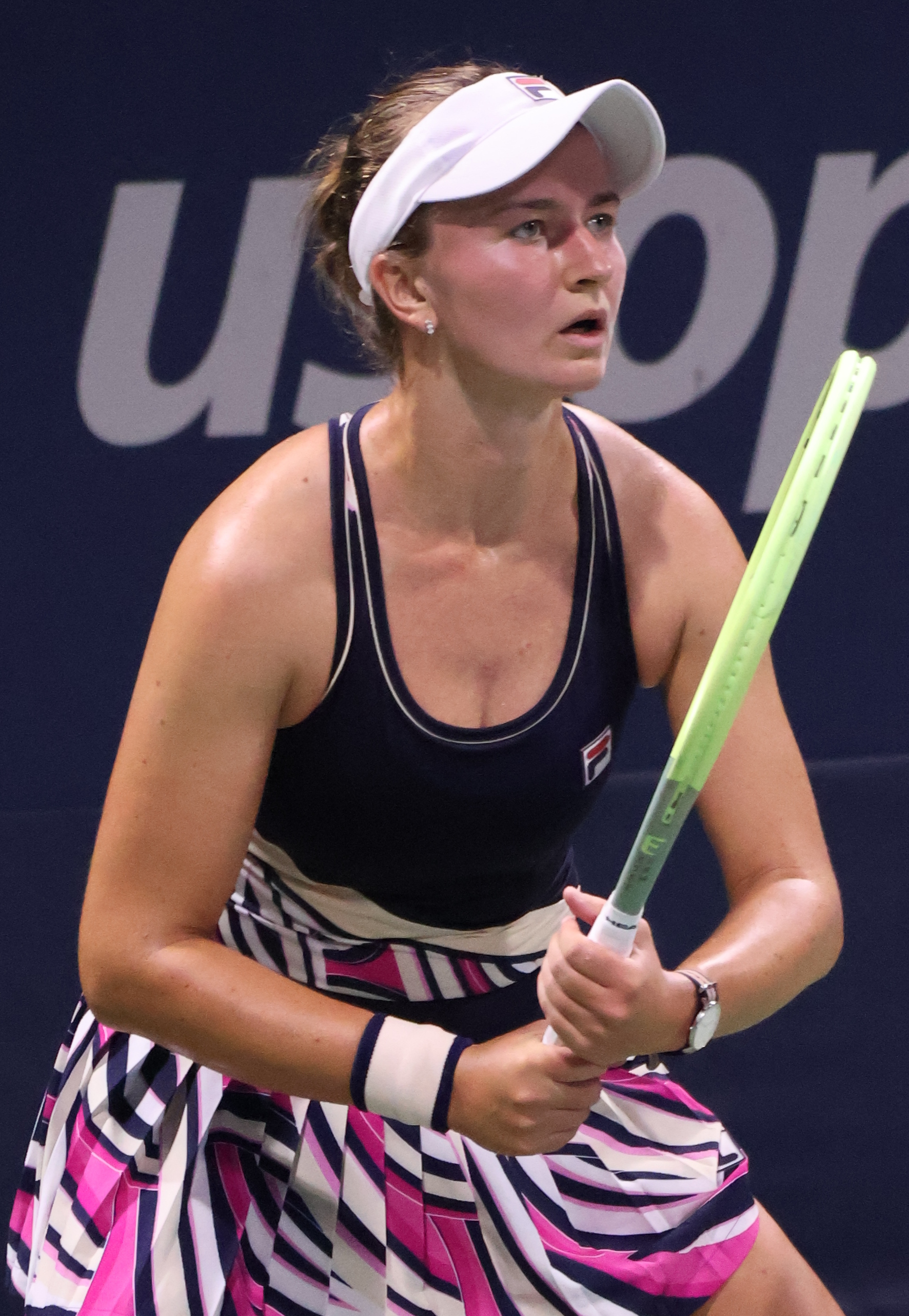
- Krejčíková at the 2023 US Open
- Native name: Barbora Krejčíková
- Country (sports): Czech Republic
- Residence: Ivančice, Czech Republic
- Born: 18 December 1995 (age 30) Brno, Czech Republic
- Height: 1.78 m (5 ft 10 in)
- Turned pro: 2010
- Plays: Right-handed (two-handed backhand)
- Coach: Jiří Novák; Pavel Motl (2023–)
- Prize money: US$19,207,289: 33rd all-time in earnings

Singles
- Career record: 432–245
- Career titles: 9
- Highest ranking: No. 2 (28 February 2022)
- Current ranking: No. 46 (26 October 2026)

Grand Slam singles results
- Australian Open: QF (2022, 2024)
- French Open: W (2021)
- Wimbledon: W (2024)
- US Open: QF (2021, 2025)

Other tournaments
- Tour Finals: SF (2024)
- Olympic Games: QF (2024)

Doubles
- Career record: 378–148
- Career titles: 20
- Highest ranking: No. 1 (22 October 2018)
- Current ranking: No. 221 (26 October 2026)

Grand Slam doubles results
- Australian Open: W (2022, 2023)
- French Open: W (2018, 2021)
- Wimbledon: W (2018, 2022)
- US Open: W (2022)

Other doubles tournaments
- Tour Finals: W (2021)
- Olympic Games: W (2021)

Mixed doubles
- Career titles: 3

Grand Slam mixed doubles results
- Australian Open: W (2019, 2020, 2021)
- French Open: QF (2021)
- Wimbledon: 3R (2017)
- US Open: QF (2016, 2024)

Team competitions
- Fed Cup: W (2018), record 1–1
Medal record
Representing Czech Republic
Women's Tennis
Gold medal – first place	2020 Tokyo	Doubles
- Last updated on: 26 October 2026.

Barbora Krejčíková (Czech pronunciation: [ˈbarbora ˈkrɛjtʃiːkovaː]; born 18 December 1995) is a Czech professional tennis player. She has been ranked as high as world No. 2 in singles and world No. 1 in doubles by the WTA. Krejčíková has won nine singles, 20 doubles, and three mixed doubles titles at the WTA Tour level. She is known for her aggressive playing style and her smooth, powerful groundstrokes.

Krejčíková has won two singles majors (at the 2021 French Open and at the 2024 Wimbledon Championships) and seven women's doubles majors, including the career Golden Slam in women's doubles. Krejčíková won all seven of her women's doubles majors partnering with compatriot Kateřina Siniaková. She also won three mixed doubles majors, all at the Australian Open, for a combined total of 12 major titles. She is one of only four active players to have won a major in all three disciplines, alongside Venus Williams, Serena Williams and Jeļena Ostapenko. She won a major, in at least one of those three disciplines, for seven consecutive seasons from 2018 to 2024.

Alongside her major titles, Krejčíková won the 2021 WTA Finals and a gold medal at the 2020 Tokyo Olympics in women's doubles, both partnering Siniaková, and was part of the Czech team that won the 2018 Fed Cup. The pairing also finished runners-up at two WTA Finals and the 2021 Australian Open.

== Early life ==
Krejčíková started playing tennis aged six. She later was coached and mentored by Jana Novotná. She played for TK Ivančice.

== Career highlights ==
=== Singles ===
In October 2020, Krejčíková reached the fourth round of the French Open tournament, which helped her attain a new best year-end ranking of No. 65 in November.

In March 2021, Krejčíková made progress to her first singles final of a WTA 1000 tournament at the Dubai Championships, eventually losing to Garbiñe Muguruza. As a result, she climbed to a new career-high of No. 38 in the singles rankings.

In May 2021, Krejčíková won her first WTA singles title at Strasbourg the day before the 2021 French Open started. Krejčíková went on to win the subsequent French Open, her first Grand Slam title in singles. As a result, she climbed to a career-high of No. 15 in the singles rankings. She won her third WTA singles title at Prague, and reached a career high singles ranking of world No. 2 in February 2022 after reaching the final at Sydney and the quarterfinals of the 2022 Australian Open. After injuries, Krejčíková would win two further singles titles in 2022: at Tallinn, and at Ostrava.

In 2023, Krejčíková won her maiden WTA 1000 title in singles at the 2023 Dubai Tennis Championships, defeating four top-10 opponents, including the world Nos 1, 2, and 3.

In 2024, Krejčíková reached her second Grand Slam final at the 2024 Wimbledon Championships, defeating former champion Elena Rybakina. She won the title defeating Jasmine Paolini in three sets. It was her second singles Major title after the French Open in 2021.

=== Doubles ===
With compatriot Kateřina Siniaková, Krejčíková won the doubles titles at the 2018 French Open and 2018 Wimbledon Championships. Krejcikova also won the 2021 French Open women's doubles title with Siniaková, and they added the Australian Open Women's doubles 2022 title in January 2022. The pair added the 2022 Wimbledon Championships title and completed the career grand slam with the doubles title in New York at the US Open.

Krejcikova has won three Grand Slam mixed doubles titles, winning the Australian Open for three years in a row from 2019 to 2021. With American partner Rajeev Ram, she won the mixed-doubles competition of the 2019 Australian Open. She succeeded in defending her title the following year alongside Nikola Mektić, and in 2021 again, with Rajeev Ram.

Additionally, Krejčíková has won six more doubles titles on the WTA Tour, one WTA 125K series doubles title, as well as 19 doubles titles on the ITF Circuit.

On 22 October 2018, Krejčíková reached No. 1 in the doubles rankings, jointly with Kateřina Siniaková. They were the fifth and sixth Czechs ranked No. 1 since 1975, and the 14th pair that attained the No. 1 together.

In August 2021, Krejcikova and Siniaková won the gold medal at the Tokyo Olympics in the women's doubles.

In November 2021, Krejčíková won the 2021 WTA Finals doubles title with Siniaková, their first title at the year-end championships.

== Career ==
=== 2013: Juniors ===
Krejčíková was ranked junior world No. 3 in October 2013. In that year, she won the girls' doubles titles at the French Open, Wimbledon and the US Open with fellow Czech Kateřina Siniaková. Alongside Oleksandra Korashvili from Ukraine, she also reached the final of the Australian Open, falling one match shy of completing the calendar-year Grand Slam. The same year, she also won the European Junior Championship U18 in Klosters, Switzerland in singles and doubles.

=== 2014–15: WTA Tour debut, WTA doubles title ===
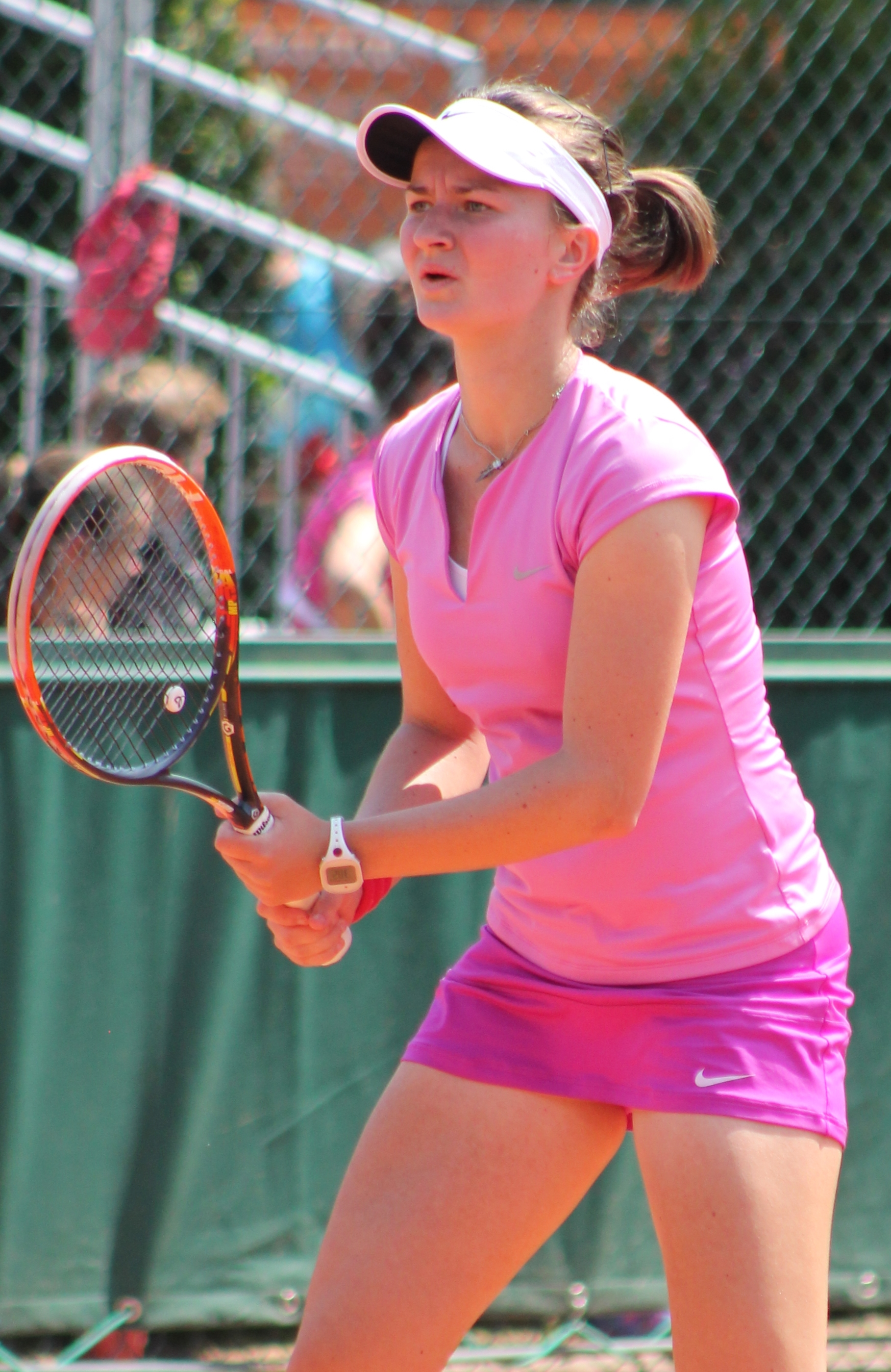
Krejčíková at the 2015 French Open qualifying tournament

Krejčíková made her WTA Tour debut at the 2014 Gastein Ladies, where she and partner Kateřina Siniaková lost in the first round. In singles, her debut was at the Tournoi de Québec, where she qualified for the main draw and reached the second round, losing to Lucie Hradecká. In doubles there, she reached the semifinals. At the Luxembourg Open, she reached her first WTA Tour doubles final pairing Hradecká. However, they were defeated by Timea Bacsinszky and Kristina Barrois. In 2015, Krejčíková only played one WTA Tour main-draw singles event, at the Tournoi de Québec, where she was defeated in the first round. At all four Grand Slam championships, she failed to qualify for the main draw, losing in the first or second rounds of them all.

In doubles, she had more success, reaching the semifinals at the Diamond Games, debuting in the main draw of the French Open, and winning her first title at the Tournoi de Québec. In November, she won her first WTA 125K title at the Open de Limoges, partnering Mandy Minella.

=== 2016: French Open semifinal, doubles top 30 ===
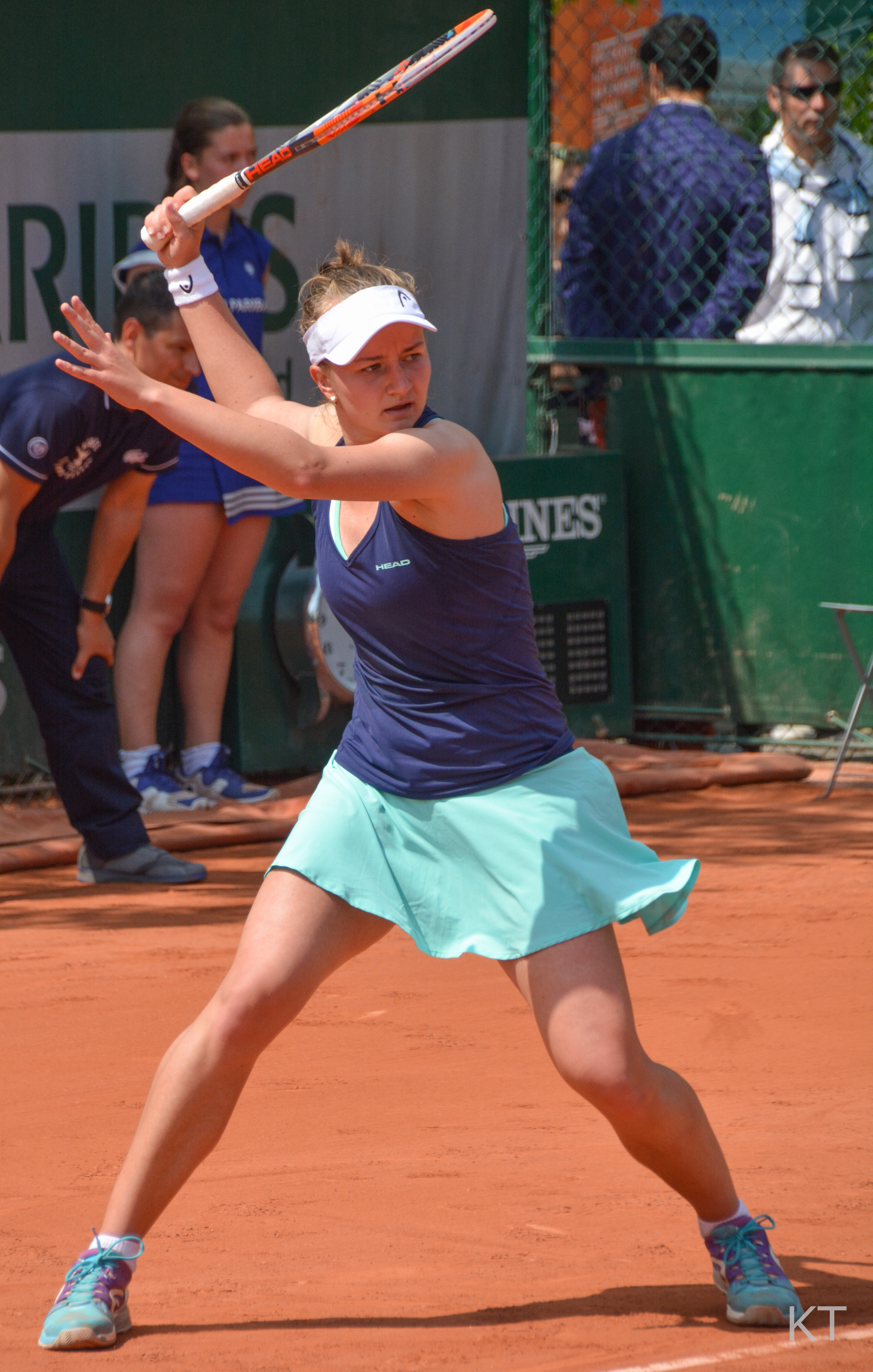
Krejčíková at the 2016 French Open

In singles, Krejčíková mainly played on the ITF Circuit. However, she took part in a few WTA tournaments but lost in qualifying or in early rounds of the main draw. She lost in the first round of qualifying at the Qatar Open, Australian Open, and Wimbledon.

Krejčíková started the year well in doubles, reaching the semifinals at the Auckland Open. Next, she played for the first time at the Australian Open, reaching the second round. In February, she played her first Premier final in doubles at the St. Petersburg Trophy. At the Qatar Open, she made her first appearance at a Premier 5/Premier Mandatory tournament, where she lost in the second round. Her breakthrough came at the French Open, where she, with her doubles partner Siniaková, reached the semifinals, losing to Elena Vesnina and Ekaterina Makarova. This result ranked her in the top 50 for the first time, at No. 34. At Wimbledon, she lost in the first round. At the US Open, she reached her second Grand Slam quarterfinal alongside Siniaková, but lost there to Martina Hingis and CoCo Vandeweghe. She entered the top 30 in rankings for the first time in her career.

=== 2017: First WTA singles final ===
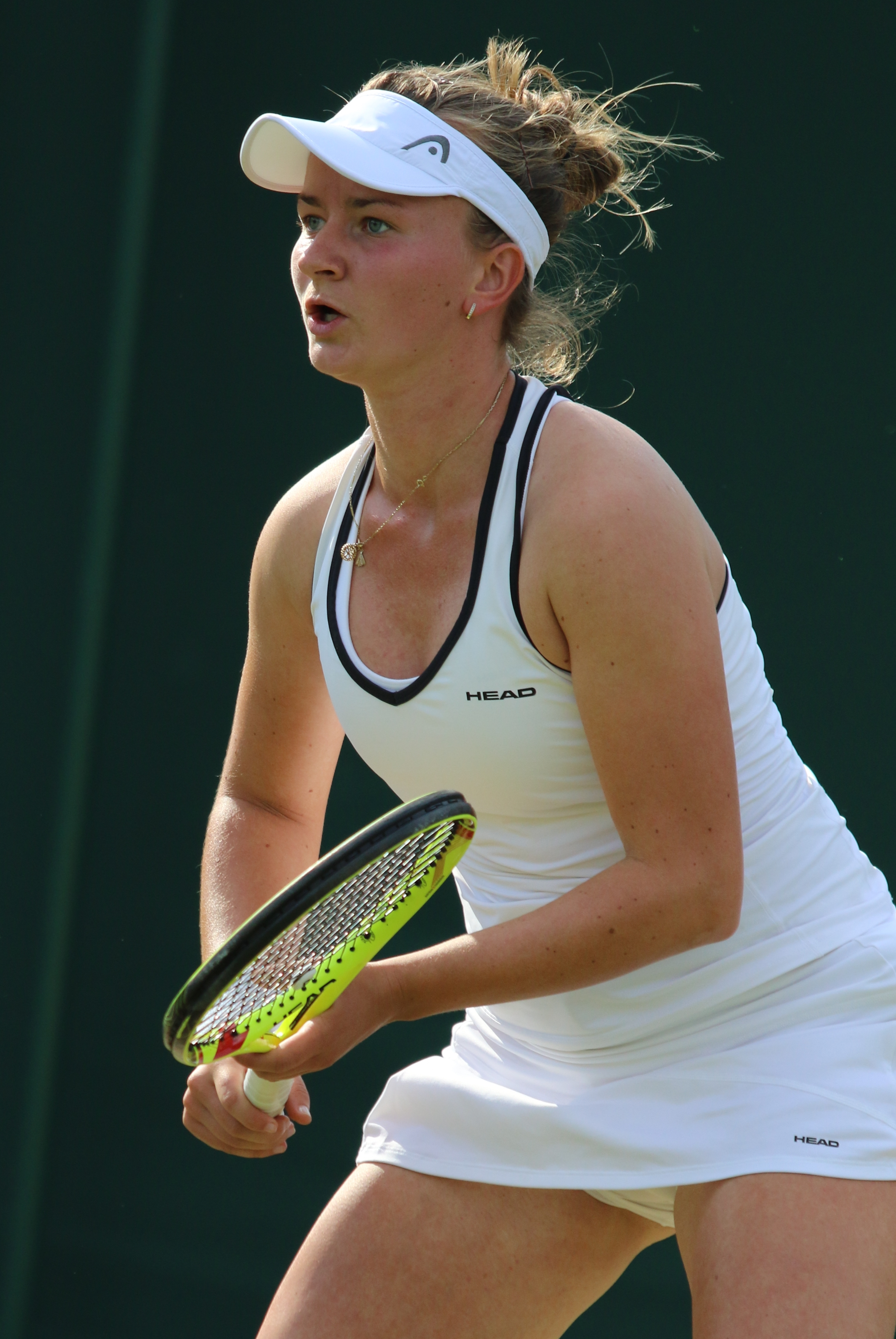
Krejčíková at the 2017 Wimbledon Championships

In the first few months, Krejčíková had success in singles on the ITF Circuit, but didn't do well on the WTA Tour. She failed in qualification at Taiwan Open and Morocco Open, and failed to reach the main-draw of Australian Open again, losing in the second round of qualification. Then suddenly, in late May, she reached her first WTA singles final at the Nurember Cup, where she played from the qualifying rounds. She lost the final to top seed Kiki Bertens. This result brought her back to the top 150, for the first time since September 2015. In the grass-court season, she only played in qualifying for Wimbledon, but missed the chance to play in the main-draw. In Båstad, she played in the quarterfinal, where she lost to Caroline Garcia. For the first time, she had the chance to play in the main draw of the Rogers Cup, but lost in the second round of qualification. At US Open, she also didn't have success, losing in the first round of qualification.

Also in doubles, the first few months were not really successful for Krejčíková, reaching only the second round at the Australian Open, and first round of Sydney International, Taiwan Open and Hungarian Open. During the clay-court season, things get better. At Morocco Open, she reached her first semifinal in 2017. At Madrid Open, she lost in the first round, but at the Italian Open she reached her first Premier 5/Premier Mandatory quarterfinal. At the French Open, partnering with Chan Hao-ching, lost to Lucie Hradecká-Kateřina Siniaková in the third round. In the grass season, she only played at Wimbledon, where she lost in the first round. At Swedish Open, she reached the doubles final, but missed the chance to win the title. At Rogers Cup, she lost in the second round of the doubles, while at the US Open, she reached the third round in doubles. In October, she played the semifinal doubles at the Kremlin Cup.

=== 2018: Two Major titles, doubles No. 1 ===
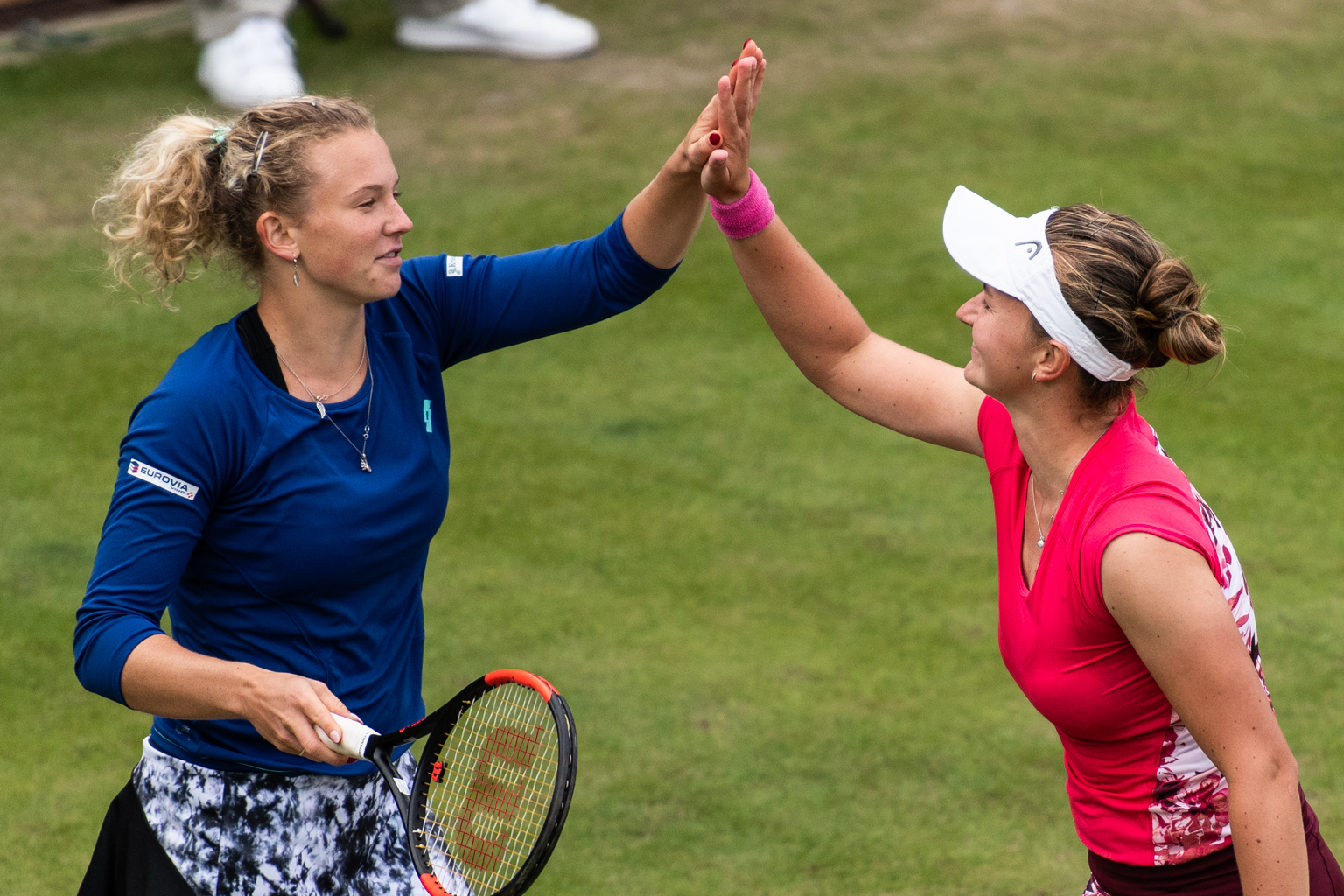
Together with Siniaková, she won the doubles titles at the 2018 French Open and Wimbledon.

Unlike previous seasons, Krejčíková now had the chance to play, at least, in singles qualifying rounds at more Premier 5/Premier Mandatory events than before. Unfortunately, she failed to qualify for the main draw at Doha, Indian Wells, Miami and Madrid, but finally qualified at the Rogers Cup, where she lost in the first round. At the majors, she also made a little bit of progress, as she finally made it to the main draw of the French Open after qualifying. In the first round of the main draw, she faced sixth seed Karolína Plíšková but lost. At the US Open, once again, she failed to qualify.

This year was by far the most successful doubles season for Krejčíková to this point. She started well, reaching the final at the Shenzhen Open, where she and Siniaková lost to Romanian combination Irina-Camelia Begu/Simona Halep. At the Australian Open, they reached the third round, Krejcikova's best result at that tournament. In February, she reached semifinals at the Premier 5 Qatar Open, again with Siniaková. At the Indian Wells Open, they reached the second round. And at the Miami Open, she played her first Premier 5/Mandatory final, but missed the chance to win the title. The clay-court season didn't start so well, reaching only second round of the Madrid Open, and first round of the Italian Open. However, after that, she won her first major doubles title at the French Open. Together with Siniaková, she defeated Japanese pair Eri Hozumi/Makoto Ninomiya in the final. The grass-court season was successful for Krejčíková, reaching the semifinal at the Birmingham Classic, and winning the title at the Wimbledon. At Wimbledon, again with Siniaková, they defeated Květa Peschke and Nicole Melichar in the final, to win a rare Roland Garros/Wimbledon double. After Wimbledon, Krejčíková entered the top 5 in doubles for the first time in her career. The US Open Series was also quite successful. Things started slowly at the Rogers Cup, losing in the second round, but at Cincinnati, she and Siniakova reached the quarterfinals. At the US Open, they were close to reaching a third successive Grand Slam final, but were stopped in the semifinal by Ashleigh Barty and CoCo Vandeweghe. On 22 October, Krejčíková, together with her partner Siniaková, became world No. 1 doubles player. For the first time in her career, Krejčíková had the opportunity to play at the WTA Finals, where she had success. In the first round, Siniaková and Krejčíková defeated Peschke/Melichar, then in semifinals, they defeated Andrea Sestini Hlaváčková/Barbora Strýcová, but unfortunately lost in the final against Tímea Babos/Kristina Mladenovic. Both, Krejčíková and Siniaková finished the year as world-number-1 doubles players. At the end of 2018, they received the award for the 2018 Doubles Team.

=== 2019: Australian Open mixed doubles champion ===
Krejčíková won her first Grand Slam tournament mixed doubles title at the Australian Open, playing with Rajeev Ram and defeating wildcard entrants Astra Sharma and John-Patrick Smith in the final. She also reached the quarterfinals in the women's doubles, and with that result she completed the set of quarterfinals or better at all four Grand Slam tournaments.

At Indian Wells, she made the final, where she and Siniaková lost to Elise Mertens and Aryna Sabalenka. The clay-court season started well, with a quarterfinal at the Madrid Open and semifinal at the Italian Open, but suffered a disappointing loss in the first round of the French Open. Wimbledon was more successful for Krejčíková, reaching the semifinals, where she and Siniaková lost to Gabriela Dabrowski/Xu Yifan.

At the Rogers Cup, she won her first Premier 5/Premier Mandatory doubles title. Together with Siniaková, they defeated Anna-Lena Grönefeld and Demi Schuurs in the final, in straight sets. At Cincinnati, she reached the quarterfinal. Krejčíková planned to play in doubles, but during her second-round match in qualifying against Asia Muhammad, Krejčíková was forced to retire. In October, she and Siniakova won the title at the Linz Open. For the second year in row, Krejčíková played at the WTA Finals, again with Siniaková, but they did not pass the group stage, winning only one match.

=== 2020: Mixed doubles Australian Open title ===
In the COVID-affected 2020 season, Krejčíková finally made progress in singles. For the first time in her career, she qualified for the main draw of the Australian Open, beating Kaia Kanepi before losing to Ekaterina Alexandrova in the second round. During the COVID-19 lockdown, Krejčíková took part in Czech tennis tournaments against players like Petra Kvitová and Karolína Muchová. When the tour restarted in August, Krejčíková impressed in a three-set loss to Simona Halep. She returned to the ITF circuit afterwards, where she had a string of disappointing results. This proved to be a turning point, as she later said she was determined to enjoy her singles tennis more. At the French Open in September, Krejčíková had a massive breakthrough, reaching the round of 16. There, she lost to qualifier Nadia Podoroska. She followed with good performances in Ostrava and Linz, where she lost to Victoria Azarenka in the round of 16 and Aryna Sabalenka in the semifinals, respectively. Krejčíková ended the year ranked world No. 65 in singles.

Krejčíková's doubles season started well with a title in Shenzhen over home team Duan Yingying and Zheng Saisai. After that, she played at Australian Open, where she reached the semifinals. In the mixed doubles, she won a second consecutive title, this time with Nikola Mektić. In Dubai, together with Zheng Saisai, Krejčíková lost in the final to Hsieh Su-wei and Barbora Strýcová. In Doha, again with Siniaková, she reached the semifinals before being defeated by Hsieh and Strýcová once again. After the COVID shutdown, Krejčíková returned to play doubles in August, and reached another semifinal at the Prague Open. She returned with Siniaková to the French Open, where they lost in the semifinals to the defending champions Tímea Babos and Kristina Mladenovic. Krejčíková's 2020 season ended in Ostrava, where she and Siniaková made it to the semifinals before Krejčíková had to withdraw.

=== 2021: French Open titles, Olympic gold, WTA Finals champion ===
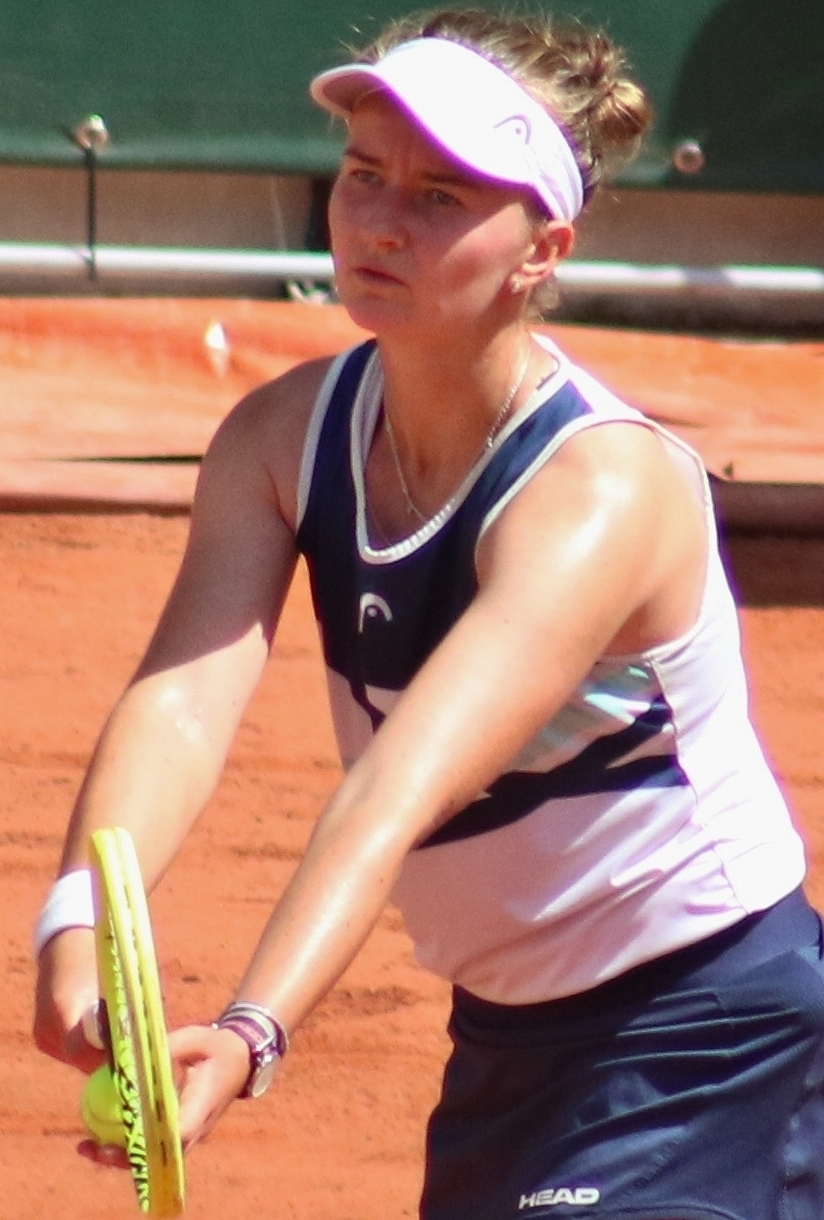
Krejčíková at the 2021 French Open

Krejčíková began the season ranked world No. 65 and reached the quarterfinals at the Grampians Trophy, losing to Jennifer Brady. For the second year in a row, she and Siniaková reached the Australian Open, doubles final but lost to Elise Mertens and Aryna Sabalenka. She won the mixed doubles for the third straight year, returning to partner with Rajeev Ram.

In the Middle East swing, Krejčíková's most notable result in doubles was making the Doha semifinals with Siniaková, before losing to Jeļena Ostapenko and Monica Niculescu. In singles, Krejčíková progressed to the final following wins over Ostapenko, Svetlana Kuznetsova, and 16th seed Maria Sakkari. There, she lost to Garbiñe Muguruza. This result entered Krejčíková into the top 40 in singles for the first time. At the Madrid Open, Krejčíková and Siniaková won the women's doubles title, beating Demi Schuurs and Gaby Dabrowski in the final for their biggest title since Wimbledon in 2018. At Strasbourg, Krejčíková won her maiden singles title, beating Sorana Cîrstea in the final.

At the French Open, Krejčíková defeated Kristýna Plíšková, Ekaterina Alexandrova and Elina Svitolina to reach the fourth round. She then defeated 2018 finalist Sloane Stephens, 6–2, 6–0 to reach her first Grand Slam singles quarterfinal. She there defeated Coco Gauff in straight sets to set up a semifinal with Maria Sakkari, which she won in three sets, saving a match point en route. In her first ever Grand Slam final in only her fifth main draw singles appearance, Krejčíková beat Anastasia Pavlyuchenkova in three sets to claim her first Grand Slam singles title. As a result, she entered the top 15 in singles for the first time in her career. In doubles, Krejčíková and Siniaková beat the Plíšková sisters in an all Czech quarterfinal and Bernarda Pera and Magda Linette in the semifinals. They then defeated Bethanie Mattek-Sands and Iga Świątek in straight sets to claim their second French Open title, and the first singles/doubles sweep in Paris since Mary Pierce in 2000. As a result, Krejčíková & Siniaková reclaimed the No. 1 and No. 2 doubles positions, respectively.

Three weeks later, Krejčíková made her Wimbledon singles debut, where she was seeded for the first time in a Grand Slam. She beat Clara Tauson, Andrea Petkovic and Anastasija Sevastova before losing to the world No. 1 Ashleigh Barty in the fourth round, ending her 15-match winning-streak. She quickly got back to her winning ways, however, claiming the Prague Open over Tereza Martincová in the final. It was her third singles title in four tournaments played. At the 2020 Olympics in July, Krejčíková defeated Zarina Diyas and Leylah Fernandez before losing to Belinda Bencic in the third round. With Siniaková, she won gold in the doubles event, beating Bencic and Viktorija Golubic in the final.

Krejčíková then made her main-draw singles debut at the 2021 US Open. She began with straight-sets wins over Astra Sharma, Christina McHale, Kamilla Rakhimova and ninth seed Garbiñe Muguruza to reach her maiden US Open quarterfinal. With an injury sustained in the Murguruza match, Krejčíková was beaten in the quarterfinals by Aryna Sabalenka. On 20 September, Krejčíková reached a new-career high ranking of world No. 5., which was surpassed on 1 November when she reached world No. 3.

Krejčíková represented the Czech Republic in the inaugural 2020–21 Billie Jean King Cup Finals in Prague in November. However, the long season appeared to catch up with her as she lost both of her singles rubbers to Angelique Kerber of Germany and Bencic of Switzerland, and did not play the doubles. One week later, Krejčíková played in the WTA Finals in singles for the first time in her career, and was the first player to do so in both singles and doubles since Karolína Plíšková in 2016. Seeded second, she lost to Muguruza, Plíšková, and Anett Kontaveit during the round robin stage. However, she and Siniaková went unbeaten in the doubles tournament, going undefeated to take the title. With the win over Mertens and Hsieh in the final, Siniaková rose to become the world No. 1, with Krejčíková as No. 2. Krejčíková was awarded the ‘Most Improved Player’ award in the official WTA year-end awards as well as ‘Doubles Team of the Year’ with Siniaková.

She ended her breakthrough season as world No. 5 in singles, and No. 2 in doubles.

=== 2022: Doubles career Golden Slam, singles No. 2 ===
Krejčíková began the season as the third seed at the Sydney International, a WTA 500 event. She defeated Jaqueline Cristian, Caroline Garcia, and fourth seed Anett Kontaveit en route to the final; her match against Kontaveit was particularly remarkable, as she came back from being bagelled in the first set to winning a final-set tiebreak 14–12, saving 7 match points. She lost in the final via another final-set tiebreak to fifth seed Paula Badosa.

As the fourth seed in singles at the 2022 Australian Open, Krejčíková reached the quarterfinals, defeating Andrea Petkovic, Wang Xiyu, 26th seed Jeļena Ostapenko, and 24th seed Victoria Azarenka, before losing to Madison Keys. In doubles, she reached the final alongside Siniaková, where they won their fourth major doubles title over Beatriz Haddad Maia and Anna Danilina.

Krejčíková followed up her performance in Australia with two early exits, falling to Dayana Yastremska in the second round of Dubai and Jeļena Ostapenko in the third round of Doha where she was forced to withdraw during a doubles match with Siniaková after injuring her right arm. Despite this setback she reached No. 2 in the world in the WTA singles rankings on 28 February 2022.

Originally scheduled to participate in Indian Wells as the top seed, she pulled out due to the ongoing arm injury that flared up just before the start of the tournament. This injury also kept Krejčíková out of the Miami Open, and forced her to withdraw from all four clay-court tournaments she had signed up for in Stuttgart, Madrid, Rome, and Strasbourg, the latter at which she was the defending champion.

Having not played a match in three months due to an elbow injury, Krejčíková entered the French Open singles draw as the second seed and defending champion. She was upset in the first round by French wildcard Diane Parry; it was only the third time in the history of the event that the defending champion lost in the first round, after Anastasia Myskina in 2005 and Jeļena Ostapenko in 2018. She was later forced to withdraw from the doubles draw as well after testing positive for COVID-19.

Krejcikova's grass court season did not start well with an early loss to Marta Kostyuk at the 2022 Eastbourne International in singles and winning just one match in doubles where she partnered Ena Shibahara. At the 2022 Wimbledon Championships, she reached the third round in singles before losing to Ajla Tomljanović in three sets. At the same tournament in doubles, she reached the final with her partner Siniakova and won the title for a second time defeating top seeds Elise Mertens and Zhang Shuai in straight sets.

At the US Open Krejcikova once again lost early in singles, going out in second round to Aleksandra Krunić. However, she was more successful in doubles, where she won the title with Siniaková, coming back from a set down to defeat Taylor Townsend and Caty McNally in the final. With this win Krejcikova and Siniaková completed the Career Golden Slam, and took their third women's doubles Grand Slam title of the year, remaining undefeated in slams in 2022.

Krejcikova returned to the singles court at the inaugural 2022 Tallinn Open and got first ever wins against her first four opponents: Ajla Tomljanović, Marta Kostyuk, Beatriz Haddad Maia and Belinda Bencic, four players she had never beaten before. In the final, Krejcikova defeated home favourite Anett Kontaveit in straight sets to win the title. A week later, Krejcikova won the title at the 2022 Ostrava Open, her second title in her home country and fifth career singles title. She defeated world number 1, Iga Świątek in three sets, giving Swiatek her first defeat in a final in three years.
Krejcikova crashed out of the final WTA1000 of the year, the 2022 Guadalajara Open Akron in the first round. She and Siniaková made the semifinals in the doubles, before losing a match tiebreak to Haddad Maia and Danilina.
The pair then played the 2022 WTA Finals – Doubles in Fort Worth, Texas. The Czechs went undefeated in the round robin stage but were defeated in the final by Veronika Kudermetova and Elise Mertens.

=== 2023: Australian doubles title, Dubai singles title ===
Krejčíková started her 2023 season at 2023 Adelaide International 2. Having struggled with a left wrist injury since Fort Worth, she lost in the second round to Daria Kasatkina.

At the Australian Open singles tournament, Krejčíková made it to the fourth round but lost to Jessica Pegula. In the Australian Open doubles she reunited with Katerina Siniaková where they won their 24th consecutive grand slam match and their seventh doubles grand slam title and for the first time, defended a Major title. Krejčíková's 11th Grand Slam title.

She won her first tournament of the season at the 2023 Dubai Tennis Championships defeating five seeds in a row and four top-10 players: 7th seed Daria Kasatkina, 12th seed Petra Kvitová, world No. 2 Aryna Sabalenka, handing her her first defeat of 2023 and ending a 13-match winning streak, world No. 3 Jessica Pegula, for her tenth top-10 win of her career, and finally world No. 1 Iga Świątek, also snapping her six match winning streak. This was Krejčíková's maiden WTA 1000 title in singles; with the win, she moved up 14 positions to No. 16, and became just the fifth woman to defeat the world No. 1, 2, and 3 in a single tournament and the only one to do it in three consecutive days.

As the top seed at the 2023 Birmingham Classic, she reached the semifinals defeating compatriot Linda Fruhvirtová. As a result, she returned to the top 10 in the singles rankings. Next she defeated Zhu Lin to reach the final. In the final, Krejčíková lost to Jeļena Ostapenko. In doubles she won the title partnering Marta Kostyuk.

Krejčíková was forced to withdraw from the 2023 Wimbledon Championships after injuring her ankle and this injury also meant she had to withdraw from the doubles, despite being defending champion.

She also announced that she was splitting with long-term coach Ales Kartous. Krejcikova has been working with Pavel Motl, a friend and former collegiate player, but still did not have a full-time replacement coach as of the end of the 2023 season.

After a difficult return from injury where she suffered several early losses, Krejčíková won her 7th career singles title, the San Diego Open, defeating Sofia Kenin in the final. Alongside Kateřina Siniaková she took the doubles title as well, defeating Danielle Collins and CoCo Vandeweghe in the final. As a result, she returned to the top 10 in the rankings on 18 September 2023.

Krejčíková competed in the WTA Elite Trophy as the top seed but went out in the group stage. In November, she represented the Czech Republic in the 2023 Billie Jean King Cup finals in Seville, winning one singles and two doubles matches alongside Siniakova. The same month, in a shock announcement, Krejčíková and Siniaková split, a move initiated by Siniaková who felt other teams know them too well.

Krejčíková ended the year ranked No. 10 in singles and No. 13 in doubles.

=== 2024: Wimbledon champion, WTA Finals semifinal ===
Krejcikova began 2024 with a run to the quarterfinal at the Australian Open, recording wins over wildcard entrant Mai Hontama, Tamara Korpach, qualifier Storm Hunter and Mirra Andreeva. Ultimately she was defeated by eventual champion Aryna Sabalenka. In doubles, she was playing with Laura Siegemund for the first time at a Grand Slam tournament. They reached the quarterfinals where they were defeated by her former partner Katerina Siniakova and her new partner Storm Hunter.

Krejcikova made the quarterfinals of the Abu Dhabi Open before losing to Liudmila Samsonova. She missed the Qatar Open as well as the Indian Wells/Miami Sunshine Double due to a back injury. Krejcikova returned to the tour at the Porsche Grand Prix in Stuttgart, Germany, after more than two months away but lost in the first round of the singles to Veronika Kudermetova. At the same event she reached the semifinals of the doubles alongside Laura Siegemund but the pair withdrew from the competition after Siegemund picked up an injury.

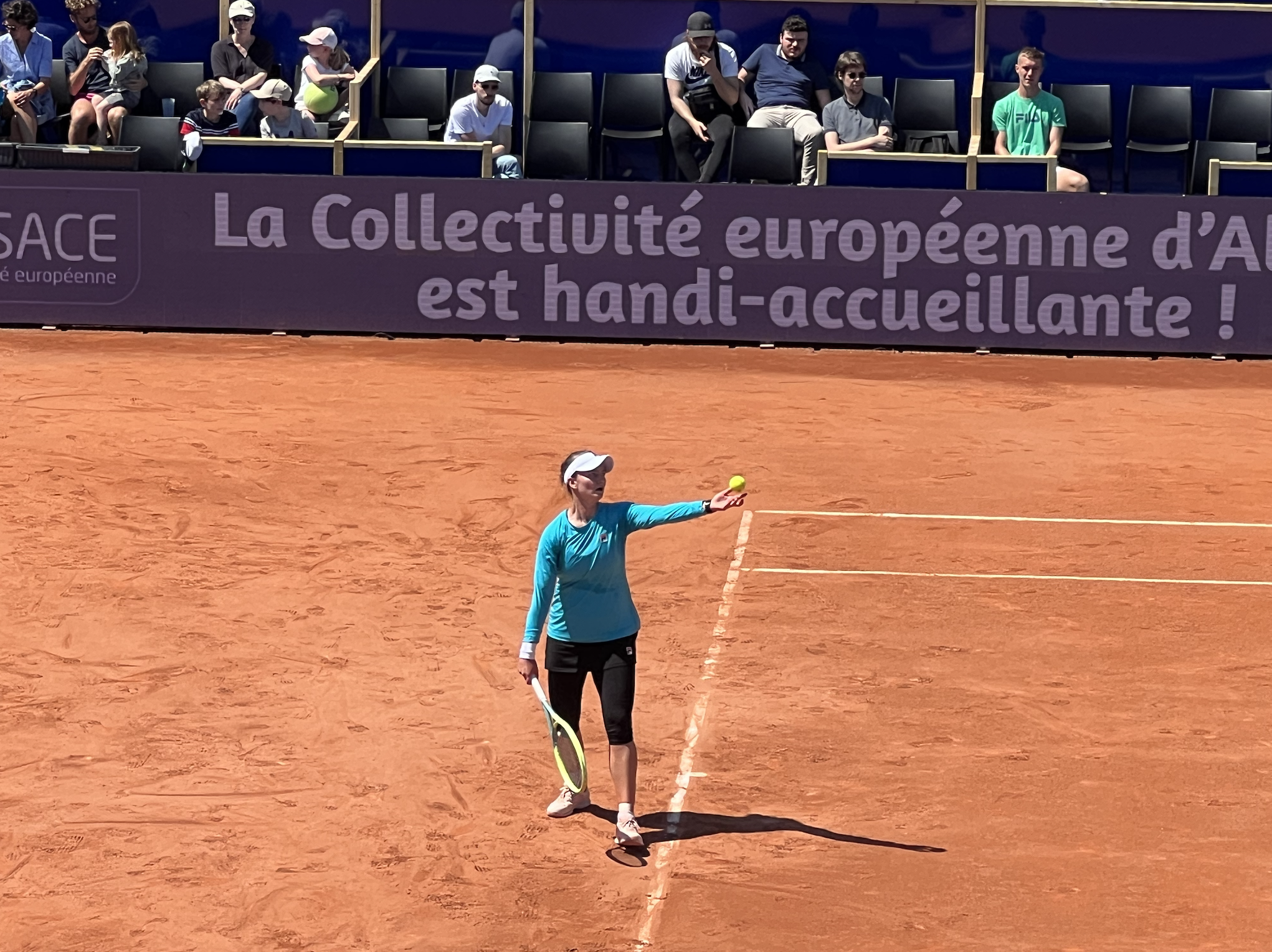
Krejcikova on serve in Strasbourg in 2024.

In May, Krejcikova and Siegemund were finalists at the WTA 1000 event, the Madrid Open, where they lost to Cristina Bucsa and Sara Sorribes Tormo in the final in straight sets. However, she once again lost in the first round of singles, to Jaqueline Cristian. Krejcikova's losing streak continued, with losses in Strasbourg to Liudmila Samsonova and at the French Open to Viktorija Golubic. In doubles, Krejcikova got her first wins at Roland Garros since taking the singles and doubles titles in 2021, reaching the third round of the women's doubles with Siegemund and getting one win in the mixed doubles with Joran Vliegen before withdrawing.

The grass-court season saw Krejcikova finally break her losing streak at the Birmingham Classic with two wins over Daria Saville and Harriet Dart, before losing to seventh seed Anastasia Potapova. However, the next week she lost in the first round of the Eastbourne International to Leylah Fernandez in three sets.

Seeded 31st, she reached her second Grand Slam tournament singles final at Wimbledon, defeating Veronika Kudermetova, qualifier Katie Volynets and Jéssica Bouzas Maneiro in the first three rounds. Krejčíková then overcame 11th seed Danielle Collins in the fourth round and 13th seed Jeļena Ostapenko in the quarterfinals before defeating fourth seed and former Wimbledon champion Elena Rybakina in the semifinals. Krejcikova defeated seventh seed Jasmine Paolini in the final to win her second Major singles title. She was the second-lowest-ranked player to win the Wimbledon singles title since the WTA rankings began in 1975. As a result, she returned to the top 10 in the singles rankings on 15 July 2024.

Krejčíková reunited with Kateřina Siniaková in the doubles at the Prague Open, winning their first title together on home soil by defeating wildcards Bethanie Mattek-Sands and Lucie Šafářová in the final as they warmed up for the 2024 Summer Olympics. At the Olympic Games in Paris she lost in the quarterfinals of the singles to Anna Karolína Schmiedlová, while her and Siniaková also fell in the last eight in the doubles to Mirra Andreeva and Diana Shnaider.

Seeded 8th, Krejčíková went out in the second round at the US Open, losing in straight sets to Elena-Gabriela Ruse.

During the WTA Asian Swing, Krejčíková lost her opening matches at the China Open to Jaqueline Cristian and to Hailey Baptiste at the Wuhan Open. Having received a bye into the second round at the Ningbo Open, she defeated lucky loser Ma Yexin. but retired due to a back injury while trailing in her quarterfinal against Mirra Andreeva.

At the season-ending WTA Finals, Krejčíková lost her opening group match in three sets to Iga Świątek, before bouncing back with straight sets wins over Jessica Pegula and Coco Gauff to secure a place in the semifinals where she was defeated by Zheng Qinwen in straight sets. During her match American journalist Jon Wertheim made derogatory comments during a private rehearsal regarding her forehead that lead to him being taken off the air. Krejčíková later wrote she expects more respect and professionalism” from the media covering sport events.

=== 2025: Injury lay-off, US Open quarterfinal ===
Krejčíková withdrew from the Australian Open due to a back injury. The injury kept her out of action until May when she made her season debut at the Strasbourg Open, but lost to Magda Linette in the first round. Krejčíková got her first win of the year by defeating Tatjana Maria in her opening match at the French Open, before losing to Veronika Kudermetova in the second round.

Moving onto the grass-court season at the Queen's Club Championships in London where she was seeded seventh, she lost to Rebecca Šramková in the first round. Two weeks later, as second seed at the Eastbourne Open, Krejčíková defeated wildcard entrants Harriet Dart and Jodie Burrage to reach the quarterfinals. She withdrew from the tournament before her last eight match due to a thigh injury.

Defending her title at Wimbledon, Krejčíková defeated Alexandra Eala and Caroline Dolehide, both in three sets, to make it into the third round, at which point she lost to 10th seed Emma Navarro in another match which went to a deciding set. As a result, Krejčíková dropped to world No. 78 on 14 July.

She started the North American hard-court swing of the season with a first round defeat to wildcard entrant Bianca Andreescu at the Canadian Open. Krejčíková found some form at her next event, the Cincinnati Open, where she defeated Alycia Parks, 10th seed Elina Svitolina and lucky loser Iva Jovic, before losing in the fourth round to seventh seed Jasmine Paolini. At the US Open, Krejčíková overcame 22nd seed Victoria Mboko, Moyuka Uchijima, 10th seed Emma Navarro and Taylor Townsend to reach the quarterfinals, at which point she lost to fourth seed Jessica Pegula.

In September, Krejčíková defeated qualifier Tatiana Prozorova and eighth seed Emma Raducanu to make it into the quarterfinals at the Korea Open. She lost in the last eight to top seed Iga Świątek. Reunited with Kateřina Siniaková, she won the doubles title at the tournament, overcoming Maya Joint and Caty McNally in the final. At the China Open, Krejčíková defeated Anna Blinkova and ninth seed Ekaterina Alexandrova, before retiring due to a knee injury in her third round match against McCartney Kessler. She subsequently announced she was bringing her season to an early end to recover from the injury. However, in December, Krejčíková entered the final WTA 125 tournament of the year, the Open de Limoges, where she was seeded third but retired due to a reoccurrence of her knee injury just seven points into the deciding set of her first round match against Anastasija Sevastova.

=== 2026: Continued fitness problems, Athens singles title ===
Krejčíková began 2026 at the Hobart International, where she lost to Peyton Stearns in the first round. She was also eliminated in the first round at the Australian Open by 23rd seed Diana Shnaider. Krejčíková registered her first singles match win of the year at the Dubai Tennis Championships in February, defeating Anastasia Pavlyuchenkova, before withdrawing from the tournament due to a thigh injury. Having missed three months of the season, she returned to the WTA Tour in May at the Italian Open where she overcame Elsa Jacquemot in her opening match, but lost to world No. 1 Aryna Sabalenka in the second round. Dropping down to the WTA 125 level the following week, Krejčíková reached the final at the Emilia-Romagna Open, losing to Dayana Yastremska. At the French Open, she squandered two match points in a first round defeat by 26th seed Hailey Baptiste.

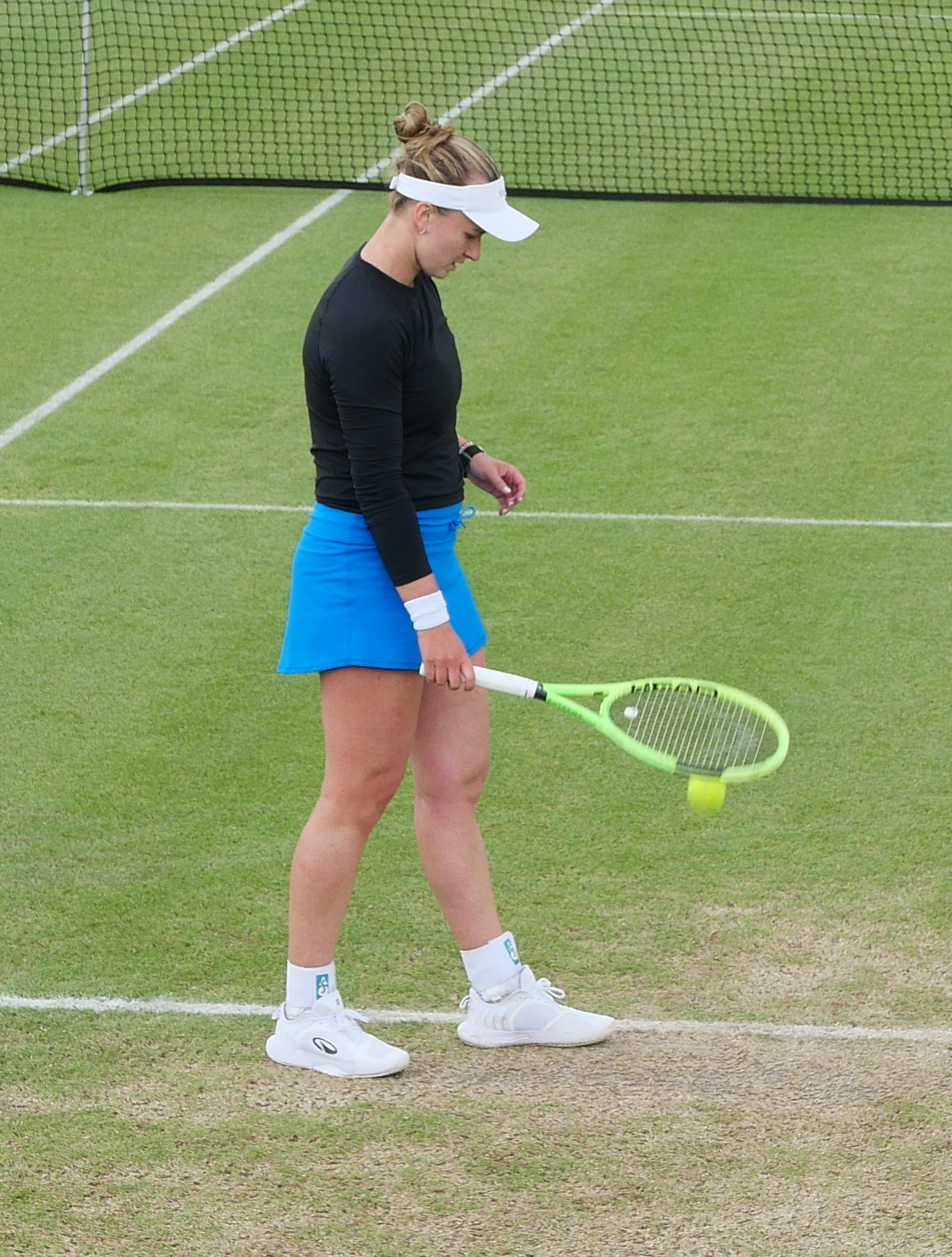
Krejčíková at the 2026 Libéma Open

Moving onto the grass court swing of the season, Krejčíková made it through to the final at the Rosmalen Open without dropping a set, but withdrew because of an upper respiratory infection, handing the title to Robin Montgomery. The next week at the Eastbourne Open, she suffered a first round exit at the hands of qualifier Kimberly Birrell. At Wimbledon, Krejčíková recorded wins over wildcard entrant Hannah Klugman, fifth seed Mirra Andreeva and fellow Czech player Nikola Bartunkova to reach the fourth round, at which point she lost to another compatriot, 10th seed Karolína Muchová, in three sets.

Seeded third at the Athens Open, Krejčíková won her first WTA Tour singles title since Wimbledon in 2024 and ninth overall, defeating top seed Clara Tauson in the semifinals and then fourth seed Maria Sakkari in the championship match. The following week, she reached the semifinals at the Prague Open, where she lost to Lilli Tagger in a third set tiebreak.

At the US Open, where she was 27th seed, Krejčíková lost to Kamilla Rakhimova in the first round. She defeated qualifier Anna-Lena Friedsam at the Singapore Open, but then withdrew from the tournament due to a back injury. Krejčíková subsequently pulled out of the final two WTA 1000 tournaments of the year in Beijing and Wuhan.

== Playing style ==
Krejčíkova is an aggressive player, with an all-court game. She is known for her strong serve, powerful groundstrokes, and wholly complete net game. She has been noted for her ability to play with "contained aggression", and to spontaneously inject pace into rallies without notice. As a result, she is capable of generating and redirecting power both crosscourt and down-the-line with both her groundstrokes, allowing her to hit winners, or induce unforced errors from opponents, with a high degree of accuracy. Her two-handed backhand is arguably her strongest groundstroke, with her being able to generate extreme angles with her backhand, and hit winners from any position on the court. Krejčíkova can strategically apply slice to her backhand, continually breaking up the pace of rallies, allowing her to construct points intelligently. Her forehand is also strong, being applied with heavy topspin, pushing opponents far behind the baseline, and allowing her to dictate rallies. She also frequently deploys the sliced forehand, a rare shot in modern tennis, to surprise opponents and aid point construction. Krejčíkova is an exceptional net player due to her doubles experience, and possesses a complete repertoire of shots to perform at the net. Although Krejčíkova typically plays at the baseline until the opportunity arises to attack the net, she occasionally utilises the serve-and-volley tactic to surprise opponents, and win points easily. She also possesses a highly effective drop shot, which typically lands close to the net, surprising opponents in long baseline rallies; if the opponent manages to retrieve the shot, her strong volleying skills allow her to end the point quickly with an aggressive volley, or a perfectly weighted lob., which was instrumental in her defeat of Sakkari in the Roland Garros 2021 semi-final and the winning shot in the 2022 Australian Open doubles final. In the post-match press conference, Krejcikova revealed this was a talent she developed as a junior when the deep lobs would bounce over her shorter opponents’ heads and over the fence!

Despite her aggressive playing style, Krejčíkova possesses excellent movement, speed, stamina, footwork, and court coverage, allowing her to defend to an exceptionally high standard, and she is an effective counterpuncher, extending rallies until she creates the opportunity to hit a winner. Her first serve is strong, peaking at 110 mph (180 km/h), allowing her to serve aces and dictate play from the first stroke. She also possesses strong kick and slice second serves, preventing opponents from scoring free points off her second serve. She is quite prone to aborted ball tosses on serve. On occasion, Krejčíkova does have a tendency to take risks on her second serve, leading to a relatively high double fault count. Due to her aggressive mindset and defensive abilities, Krejčíkova is a dangerous opponent on all surfaces, although her strongest surface is clay, where the high bounce and slow pace allow her to execute her playing style perfectly.

== Endorsements ==
Krejčíková signed an endorsement deal in 2022 with Fila for clothing, footwear, and apparel. In Cincinnati Open 2025, she return to use Head for apparel. She is endorsed by Head for racquets, specifically using the Head Extreme racquet; she was previously sponsored by Head for clothing and footwear, until switching to Fila. She is also sponsored by Roko-Motor, the Czech division of Jaguar Land Rover.

== Career statistics ==
=== Grand Slam tournament performance timelines ===
Key
W	F	SF	QF	#R	RR	Q#	DNQ	A	NH

(W) winner; (F) finalist; (SF) semifinalist; (QF) quarterfinalist; (#R) rounds 4, 3, 2, 1; (RR) round-robin stage; (Q#) qualification round; (DNQ) did not qualify; (A) absent; (NH) not held; (SR) strike rate (events won / competed); (W–L) win–loss record.
To avoid confusion and double counting, these charts are updated at the conclusion of a tournament or when the player's participation has ended.

==== Singles ====
Tournament	2014	2015	2016	2017	2018	2019	2020	2021	2022	2023	2024	2025	2026	SR	W–L	Win %
Australian Open	A	Q2	Q3	Q2	Q3	Q2	2R	2R	QF	4R	QF	A	1R	0 / 6	13–6	68%
French Open	A	Q2	A	A	1R	Q1	4R	W	1R	1R	1R	2R	1R	1 / 8	11–7	61%
Wimbledon	A	Q1	Q1	Q2	A	A	NH	4R	3R	2R	W	3R	4R	1 / 6	18–5	78%
US Open	Q3	Q1	A	Q1	Q1	Q2	A	QF	2R	1R	2R	QF	1R	0 / 5	10–5	67%
Win–loss	0–0	0–0	0–0	0–0	0–1	0–0	4–2	15–3	7–4	4–4	12–3	7–3	3–3	2 / 25	52–23	69%

==== Doubles ====
Tournament	2015	2016	2017	2018	2019	2020	2021	2022	2023	2024	2025	2026	SR	W–L	Win %
Australian Open	A	2R	2R	3R	QF	SF	F	W	W	QF	A	A	2 / 9	31–7	82%
French Open	1R	SF	3R	W	1R	SF	W	A	1R	3R	A	A	2 / 9	24–7	77%
Wimbledon	A	1R	1R	W	SF	NH	QF	W	A	QF	3R	A	2 / 8	22–5	81%
US Open	A	QF	3R	SF	A	A	1R	W	2R	A	1R	A	1 / 7	16–6	73%
Win–loss	0–1	8–4	5–4	18–2	7–3	8–2	12–3	18–0	7–2	8–3	2–2	0–0	7 / 33	93–26	78%

==== Mixed doubles ====
Tournament	2016	2017	2018	2019	2020	2021	2022	SR	W–L	Win %
Australian Open	A	1R	A	W	W	W	A	3 / 4	15–1	94%
French Open	A	1R	A	A	NH	QF	A	0 / 2	1–2	33%
Wimbledon	2R	3R	A	A	NH	A	A	0 / 2	2–2	50%
US Open	QF	A	A	A	NH	A	A	0 / 1	2–1	67%
Win–loss	3–2	1–3	0–0	5–0	5–0	6–1	0–0	3 / 9	20–6	77%

=== Grand Slam tournament finals ===
==== Singles: 2 (2 titles) ====
Result	Year	Tournament	Surface	Opponent	Score
Win	2021	French Open	Clay	(Russia) Anastasia Pavlyuchenkova	6–1, 2–6, 6–4
Win	2024	Wimbledon	Grass	(Italy) Jasmine Paolini	6–2, 2–6, 6–4

==== Doubles: 8 (7 titles, 1 runner-up) ====
Result	Year	Tournament	Surface	Partner	Opponents	Score
Win	2018	French Open	Clay	(Czech Republic) Kateřina Siniaková	(Japan) Eri Hozumi (Japan) Makoto Ninomiya	6–3, 6–3
Win	2018	Wimbledon	Grass	(Czech Republic) Kateřina Siniaková	(United States) Nicole Melichar (Czech Republic) Květa Peschke	6–4, 4–6, 6–0
Loss	2021	Australian Open	Hard	(Czech Republic) Kateřina Siniaková	(Belgium) Elise Mertens (Belarus) Aryna Sabalenka	2–6, 3–6
Win	2021	French Open (2)	Clay	(Czech Republic) Kateřina Siniaková	(United States) Bethanie Mattek-Sands (Poland) Iga Świątek	6–4, 6–2
Win	2022	Australian Open	Hard	(Czech Republic) Kateřina Siniaková	(Kazakhstan) Anna Danilina (Brazil) Beatriz Haddad Maia	6–7^{(3–7)}, 6–4, 6–4
Win	2022	Wimbledon (2)	Grass	(Czech Republic) Kateřina Siniaková	(Belgium) Elise Mertens (China) Zhang Shuai	6–2, 6–4
Win	2022	US Open	Hard	(Czech Republic) Kateřina Siniaková	(United States) Caty McNally (United States) Taylor Townsend	3–6, 7–5, 6–1
Win	2023	Australian Open (2)	Hard	(Czech Republic) Kateřina Siniaková	(Japan) Shuko Aoyama (Japan) Ena Shibahara	6–4, 6–3

==== Mixed doubles: 3 (3 titles) ====
Result	Year	Tournament	Surface	Partner	Opponents	Score
Win	2019	Australian Open	Hard	(United States) Rajeev Ram	(Australia) Astra Sharma (Australia) John-Patrick Smith	7–6^{(7–3)}, 6–1
Win	2020	Australian Open (2)	Hard	(Croatia) Nikola Mektić	(United States) Bethanie Mattek-Sands (United Kingdom) Jamie Murray	5–7, 6–4, [10–1]
Win	2021	Australian Open (3)	Hard	(United States) Rajeev Ram	(Australia) Samantha Stosur (Australia) Matthew Ebden	6–1, 6–4

=== Olympic Games medal matches ===
==== Doubles: 1 (gold medal) ====
Result	Year	Tournament	Surface	Partner	Opponents	Score
Gold	2021	Tokyo 2020	Hard	(Czech Republic) Kateřina Siniaková	(Switzerland) Belinda Bencic (Switzerland) Viktorija Golubic	7–5, 6–1

=== Year-end championships (WTA Finals) ===
==== Doubles: 3 (1 title, 2 runner-ups) ====
Result	Year	Tournament	Surface	Partner	Opponents	Score
Loss	2018	WTA Finals, Singapore	Hard (i)	(Czech Republic) Kateřina Siniaková	(Hungary) Tímea Babos (France) Kristina Mladenovic	4–6, 5–7
Win	2021	WTA Finals, Mexico	Hard	(Czech Republic) Kateřina Siniaková	(Chinese Taipei) Hsieh Su-wei (Belgium) Elise Mertens	6–3, 6–4
Loss	2022	WTA Finals, US	Hard (i)	(Czech Republic) Kateřina Siniaková	Veronika Kudermetova (Belgium) Elise Mertens	2–6, 6–4, [9–11]
