= 2012 Challenge Bell =

- Date: September 11–17
- Edition: 20th
- Category: WTA International
- Draw: 32S (32Q) / 16D (0Q)
- Prize money: US$220,000
- Surface: Carpet – indoors
- Location: Quebec City, Canada
- Venue: PEPS de l'Université Laval

Champions

Singles
- (Belgium) Kirsten Flipkens

Doubles
- (Germany) Tatjana Malek / (France) Kristina Mladenovic
| ← 2011 · | Tournoi de Québec | · 2013 → |

The 2012 Challenge Bell was a tennis tournament played on indoor carpet courts. It was the 20th edition of the Challenge Bell, and was part of the WTA International tournaments of the 2012 WTA Tour. It took place at the PEPS de l'Université Laval in Quebec City, Canada, from September 11 through September 17, 2012.

== Finals ==
=== Singles ===
(Belgium) Kirsten Flipkens defeated (Czech Republic) Lucie Hradecká, 6–1, 7–5

=== Doubles ===
(Germany) Tatjana Malek / (France) Kristina Mladenovic defeated (Poland) Alicja Rosolska / (United Kingdom) Heather Watson, 7–6^{(7–5)}, 6–7^{(6–8)}, [10–7]

== Points and prize money ==
=== Point distribution ===
| Event | W | F | SF | QF | Round of 16 | Round of 32 | Q | Q3 | Q2 | Q1 |
| Singles | 280 | 200 | 130 | 70 | 30 | 1 | 16 | 10 | 6 | 1 |
| Doubles | 280 | 200 | 130 | 70 | 1 | — | — | — | — | — |

=== Prize money ===
| Event | W | F | SF | QF | Round of 16 | Round of 32^{*} | Q3 | Q2 | Q1 |
| Singles | $37,000 | $19,000 | $10,200 | $5,340 | $2,950 | $1,725 | $860 | $460 | $265 |
| Doubles | $11,000 | $5,750 | $3,100 | $1,650 | $860 | — | — | — | — |
Doubles prize money per team

^* Qualifiers prize money is also the round of 32 prize money

== Singles main draw entrants ==
=== Seeds ===
| Country | Player | Rank^{1} | Seed |
|---|---|---|---|
| SVK | Dominika Cibulková | 14 | 1 |
| BEL | Yanina Wickmayer | 29 | 2 |
| GER | Mona Barthel | 35 | 3 |
| CAN | Aleksandra Wozniak | 48 | 4 |
| SUI | Romina Oprandi | 56 | 5 |
| CZE | Barbora Záhlavová-Strýcová | 60 | 6 |
| CRO | Petra Martić | 64 | 7 |
| CZE | Lucie Hradecká | 69 | 8 |

- ^{1} Rankings are as of August 27, 2012

=== Other entrants ===
The following players received wildcards into the singles main draw:

- (Canada) Eugenie Bouchard
- (Slovakia) Dominika Cibulková
- (Belgium) Yanina Wickmayer

The following players received entry from the qualifying draw:

- (United States) Lauren Davis
- (Canada) Heidi El Tabakh
- (France) Kristina Mladenovic
- (United States) Maria Sanchez

The following player received entry as a lucky loser:

- (United States) Jessica Pegula

=== Withdrawals ===
Before the tournament

- (Sweden) Sofia Arvidsson
- (New Zealand) Marina Erakovic
- (Italy) Camila Giorgi (illness)
- (United States) Christina McHale (illness)
- (France) Virginie Razzano

=== Retirements ===
- (Georgia (country)) Anna Tatishvili (low back injury)
- (Canada) Aleksandra Wozniak (right shoulder injury)

== Doubles main draw entrants ==
=== Seeds ===
| Country | Player | Country | Player | Rank^{1} | Seed |
|---|---|---|---|---|---|
| POL | Alicja Rosolska | GBR | Heather Watson | 120 | 1 |
| LAT | Līga Dekmeijere | CRO | Petra Martić | 125 | 2 |
| GER | Tatjana Malek | FRA | Kristina Mladenovic | 151 | 3 |
| USA | Lindsay Lee-Waters | USA | Megan Moulton-Levy | 175 | 4 |

- ^{1} Rankings are as of August 27, 2012

=== Other entrants ===
The following pairs received wildcards into the doubles main draw:

- (Canada) Stéphanie Dubois / (Canada) Heidi El Tabakh
- (United States) Grace Min / (Canada) Carol Zhao
