= 2012 Challenge Bell – Singles =

Singles
- 2012 Challenge Bell

Final
- Champion: (Belgium) Kirsten Flipkens
- Runner-up: (Czech Republic) Lucie Hradecká
- Score: 6–1, 7–5

Details
- Draw: 32
- Seeds: 8

Events
Singles	Doubles
← 2011 ·	Tournoi de Québec	· 2013 →

Barbora Záhlavová-Strýcová was the defending champion, but lost in the quarterfinals to Mona Barthel.

Kirsten Flipkens won her maiden WTA singles title, defeating Lucie Hradecká 6–1, 7–5 in the final.

== Seeds ==
1. (Slovakia) Dominika Cibulková (first round)
2. (Belgium) Yanina Wickmayer (second round)
3. (Germany) Mona Barthel (semifinals)
4. (Canada) Aleksandra Wozniak (second round, withdrew because of a right shoulder injury)
5. (Switzerland) Romina Oprandi (first round)
6. (Czech Republic) Barbora Záhlavová-Strýcová (quarterfinals)
7. (Croatia) Petra Martić (second round)
8. (Czech Republic) Lucie Hradecká (final)

== Main draw ==
=== Key ===
- Q = Qualifier
- WC = Wild card
- LL = Lucky loser
- Alt = Alternate
- ITF = ITF entry
- PR = Protected ranking
- SR = Special ranking
- SE = Special exempt
- JE = Junior exempt
- JR = Junior Accelerator Programme entrant
- CO = College Accelerator Programme entrant
- NG = Next Gen Accelerator Program entrant
- w/o = Walkover
- r = Retired
- d = Defaulted

=== Finals ===
Semifinals
(Belgium) Kirsten Flipkens	7^{8}	7^{7}
3	(Germany) Mona Barthel	6^{6}	6^{3}
Q	(France) Kristina Mladenovic	5	6^{5}
8	(Czech Republic) Lucie Hradecká	7	7^{7}

Final
(Belgium) Kirsten Flipkens	6	7
8	(Czech Republic) Lucie Hradecká	1	5

=== Top half ===
First round
1/WC	(Slovakia) D Cibulková	6	3	5
(Belgium) K Flipkens	2	6	7
Q	(Canada) H El Tabakh	4	6	6^{5}
(Croatia) M Lučić	6	3	7^{7}
(Georgia (country)) A Tatishvili	7	1	6
(Kazakhstan) S Karatantcheva	5	6	1
LL	(United States) J Pegula	4	5
7	(Croatia) P Martić	6	7
3	(Germany) M Barthel	6^{5}	7^{7}	6
(United Kingdom) H Watson	7^{7}	6^{5}	1
(Portugal) M Larcher de Brito	2	6	3
(Slovenia) P Rampre	6	1	6
(United States) A Glatch	6^{3}	3
(Germany) T Malek	7^{7}	6
(Canada) M-È Pelletier	6^{2}	1
6	(Czech Republic) B Záhlavová-Strýcová	7^{7}	6

Second round
(Belgium) K Flipkens	6^{2}	6	6
(Croatia) M Lučić	7^{7}	2	4
(Georgia (country)) A Tatishvili	6	6
7	(Croatia) P Martić	2	3
3	(Germany) M Barthel	6	6
(Slovenia) P Rampre	2	1
(Germany) T Malek	3	3
6	(Czech Republic) B Záhlavová-Strýcová	6	6

Quarterfinals
(Belgium) K Flipkens	6	3
(Georgia (country)) A Tatishvili	2	0^{r}
3	(Germany) M Barthel	6	6
6	(Czech Republic) B Záhlavová-Strýcová	3	4

Semifinals
(Belgium) K Flipkens	7^{8}	7^{7}
3	(Germany) M Barthel	6^{6}	6^{3}

=== Bottom half ===
First round
5	(Switzerland) R Oprandi	1	6^{11}
(Germany) A Beck	6	7^{13}
Q	(France) K Mladenovic	6	6^{6}	6
(United States) M Brengle	4	7^{8}	4
(United States) I Falconi	5	6^{6}
(United States) M Oudin	7	7^{8}
(Russia) E Vesnina	2	6	3
4	(Canada) A Wozniak	6	4	6
8	(Czech Republic) L Hradecká	6	7^{7}
Q	(United States) M Sanchez	4	6^{5}
(United States) G Min	4	3
WC	(Canada) E Bouchard	6	6
(Canada) S Dubois	5	3
Q	(United States) L Davis	7	6
(United States) A Riske	3	3
2/WC	(Belgium) Y Wickmayer	6	6

Second round
(Germany) A Beck	6	4	3
Q	(France) K Mladenovic	4	6	6
(United States) M Oudin	w/o
4	(Canada) A Wozniak
8	(Czech Republic) L Hradecká	7^{7}	2	7^{7}
WC	(Canada) E Bouchard	6^{2}	6	6^{4}
Q	(United States) L Davis	6	6
2/WC	(Belgium) Y Wickmayer	1	1

Quarterfinals
Q	(France) K Mladenovic	6	6
(United States) M Oudin	0	1
8	(Czech Republic) L Hradecká	6	6
Q	(United States) L Davis	4	2

Semifinals
Q	(France) K Mladenovic	5	6^{5}
8	(Czech Republic) L Hradecká	7	7^{7}

== Qualifying ==
=== Seeds ===
1. (United States) Lauren Davis (qualified)
2. (France) Kristina Mladenovic (qualified)
3. (United States) Jessica Pegula (qualifying competition, lucky loser)
4. (United States) Chichi Scholl (second round)
5. (Canada) Heidi El Tabakh (qualified)
6. (Switzerland) Amra Sadiković (first round)
7. (United States) Maria Sanchez (qualified)
8. (France) Julie Coin (qualifying competition)

=== Qualifiers ===
1. (United States) Lauren Davis
2. (France) Kristina Mladenovic
3. (United States) Maria Sanchez
4. (Canada) Heidi El Tabakh

=== Lucky loser ===
1. (United States) Jessica Pegula

=== Qualifying draw ===
==== First qualifier ====
First round
1	(United States) Lauren Davis	6	6
WC	(Canada) Priscila Nunez	1	1
(Canada) Françoise Abanda	6^{8}	3
(United States) Lena Litvak	7^{10}	6
(United States) Shelby Rogers	6	6
WC	(United States) Diana Ospina	2	2
WC	(Canada) Carol Zhao	3	7	4
8	(France) Julie Coin	6	5	6

Second round
1	(United States) Lauren Davis	7	6
(United States) Lena Litvak	5	4
(United States) Shelby Rogers	5	3
8	(France) Julie Coin	7	6

Qualifying competition
1	(United States) Lauren Davis	6	6
8	(France) Julie Coin	3	4

==== Second qualifier ====
First round
2	(France) Kristina Mladenovic	6	6
WC	(United States) Jessica Lawrence	0	2
WC	(Poland) Alicja Rosolska	7	6
WC	(United States) Emily Harman	5	1
(United States) Asia Muhammed	4	6	6
(Croatia) Maria Abramović	6	1	0
(Canada) Gabriela Dabrowski	6	6
6	(Switzerland) Amra Sadiković	2	2

Second round
2	(France) Kristina Mladenovic	6	6
WC	(Poland) Alicja Rosolska	4	3
(United States) Asia Muhammed	2	2
(Canada) Gabriela Dabrowski	6	6

Qualifying competition
2	(France) Kristina Mladenovic	6	2	6
(Canada) Gabriela Dabrowski	4	6	4

==== Third qualifier ====
First round
3	(United States) Jessica Pegula	6	6
WC	(United Kingdom) Robyn Beddow	1	1
WC	(Canada) Stephanie Wetmore	0	2
(United States) Ashley Weinhold	6	6
(United States) Alexandra Mueller	6	6
(Slovakia) Lenka Wienerová	4	4
(Russia) Elena Bovina	3	6	2
7	(United States) Maria Sanchez	6	1	6

Second round
3	(United States) Jessica Pegula	6	1	6
(United States) Ashley Weinhold	2	6	1
(United States) Alexandra Mueller	7^{7}	3	2
7	(United States) Maria Sanchez	6^{1}	6	6

Qualifying competition
3	(United States) Jessica Pegula	4	2
7	(United States) Maria Sanchez	6	6

==== Fourth qualifier ====
First round
4	(United States) Chichi Scholl	6	6
(United States) Tori Kinard	4	3
WC	(Latvia) Līga Dekmeijere	5	4
(United States) Jennifer Elie	7	6
WC	(United States) Simone Kalhorn	0	2
(United States) Nicole Melichar	6	6
(Brazil) Beatriz Haddad Maia	4	6	3
5	(Canada) Heidi El Tabakh	6	1	6

Second round
4	(United States) Chichi Scholl	4	4
(United States) Jennifer Elie	6	6
(United States) Nicole Melichar	5	2
5	(Canada) Heidi El Tabakh	7	6

Qualifying competition
(United States) Jennifer Elie	2	1
5	(Canada) Heidi El Tabakh	6	6
