= 2013 Challenge Bell – Singles =

Singles
- 2013 Challenge Bell

Final
- Champion: (Czech Republic) Lucie Šafářová
- Runner-up: (New Zealand) Marina Erakovic
- Score: 6–4, 6–3

Details
- Draw: 32
- Seeds: 8

Events
| Singles | Doubles |
| ← 2012 · | Tournoi de Québec | · 2014 → |

Kirsten Flipkens was the defending champion, but lost in the first round to Polona Hercog.

Lucie Šafářová won the title, defeating Marina Erakovic 6–4, 6–3 in the final.

== Seeds ==
1. (Belgium) Kirsten Flipkens (first round)
2. (France) Kristina Mladenovic (quarterfinals)
3. (Czech Republic) Lucie Šafářová (champion)
4. (United States) Bethanie Mattek-Sands (second round, retired because of a right knee injury)
5. (Canada) Eugenie Bouchard (semifinals)
6. (New Zealand) Marina Erakovic (final)
7. (United States) Lauren Davis (quarterfinals)
8. (France) Caroline Garcia (second round)

== Draw ==
=== Key ===
- Q = Qualifier
- WC = Wild card
- LL = Lucky loser
- Alt = Alternate
- ITF = ITF entry
- PR = Protected ranking
- SR = Special ranking
- SE = Special exempt
- JE = Junior exempt
- JR = Junior Accelerator Programme entrant
- CO = College Accelerator Programme entrant
- NG = Next Gen Accelerator Program entrant
- w/o = Walkover
- r = Retired
- d = Defaulted

=== Finals ===
Semifinals
(United States) Christina McHale | 4 | 3
6 | (New Zealand) Marina Erakovic | 6 | 6
3/WC | (Czech Republic) Lucie Šafářová | 3 | 6 | 6
5 | (Canada) Eugenie Bouchard | 6 | 3 | 2

Final
6 | (New Zealand) Marina Erakovic | 4 | 3
3/WC | (Czech Republic) Lucie Šafářová | 6 | 6

=== Top half ===
First round
1 | (Belgium) K Flipkens | 3 | 1
(Slovenia) P Hercog | 6 | 6
(Portugal) M Larcher de Brito | 6^{5} | 5
Q | (France) J Coin | 7^{7} | 7
(United States) C McHale | 6 | 6
(Austria) T Paszek | 2 | 1
WC | (Canada) A Wozniak | 3 | 4
8 | (France) C Garcia | 6 | 6
4 | (United States) B Mattek-Sands | 6 | 6
WC | (Canada) S Dubois | 3 | 4
(Croatia) A Tomljanović | 6 | 2 | 6
(United States) M Sanchez | 2 | 6 | 3
(Greece) E Daniilidou | 3 | 5
(Czech Republic) B Záhlavová-Strýcová | 6 | 7
(United States) M Burdette | 7 | 6^{4} | 3
6 | (New Zealand) M Erakovic | 5 | 7^{7} | 6

Second round
(Slovenia) P Hercog | 6 | 6
Q | (France) J Coin | 0 | 2
(United States) C McHale | 2 | 7^{9} | 6
8 | (France) C Garcia | 6 | 6^{7} | 3
4 | (United States) B Mattek-Sands | 5 | 6 | 1^{r}
(Croatia) A Tomljanović | 7 | 3 | 4
(Czech Republic) B Záhlavová-Strýcová | 2 | 1
6 | (New Zealand) M Erakovic | 6 | 6

Quarterfinals
(Slovenia) P Hercog | 6 | 6^{4} | 3
(United States) C McHale | 1 | 7^{7} | 6
(Croatia) A Tomljanović | 6 | 1 | 5
6 | (New Zealand) M Erakovic | 2 | 6 | 7

Semifinals
(United States) C McHale | 4 | 3
6 | (New Zealand) M Erakovic | 6 | 6

=== Bottom half ===
First round
7 | (United States) L Davis | 6^{5} | 6 | 6
(Italy) C Giorgi | 7^{7} | 3 | 2
(Czech Republic) A Hlaváčková | 7^{7} | 5 | 6
(Australia) A Rodionova | 6^{3} | 7 | 1
(Canada) S Fichman | 4 | 0
(Croatia) M Lučić-Baroni | 6 | 6
(Georgia (country)) A Tatishvili | 3 | 2
3/WC | (Czech Republic) L Šafářová | 6 | 6
5 | (Canada) E Bouchard | 6 | 2 | 7^{7}
(Sweden) S Arvidsson | 1 | 6 | 6^{0}
Q | (Kazakhstan) S Karatantcheva | 6 | 6
Q | (Switzerland) A Sadiković | 3 | 4
(Czech Republic) L Hradecká | 4 | 6^{1}
(Croatia) P Martić | 6 | 7^{7}
Q | (United States) M Oudin | 6^{5} | 7 | 2
2 | (France) K Mladenovic | 7^{7} | 5 | 6

Second round
7 | (United States) L Davis | 6 | 2 | 6
(Czech Republic) A Hlaváčková | 1 | 6 | 3
(Croatia) M Lučić-Baroni | 6^{4} | 6^{10}
3/WC | (Czech Republic) L Šafářová | 7^{7} | 7^{12}
5 | (Canada) E Bouchard | 7^{7} | 6
Q | (Kazakhstan) S Karatantcheva | 6^{2} | 4
(Croatia) P Martić | 3 | 3^{r}
2 | (France) K Mladenovic | 6 | 2

Quarterfinals
7 | (United States) L Davis | 2 | 4
3/WC | (Czech Republic) L Šafářová | 6 | 6
5 | (Canada) E Bouchard | 6 | 6
2 | (France) K Mladenovic | 3 | 2

Semifinals
3/WC | (Czech Republic) L Šafářová | 3 | 6 | 6
5 | (Canada) E Bouchard | 6 | 3 | 2

== Qualifying ==
=== Seeds ===
1. (United States) Melanie Oudin (qualified)
2. (Russia) Alla Kudryavtseva (first round)
3. (United States) Grace Min (qualifying competition)
4. (France) Julie Coin (qualified)
5. (Kazakhstan) Sesil Karatantcheva (qualified)
6. (United States) Irina Falconi (first round)
7. (Colombia) Catalina Castaño (second round)
8. (United States) Madison Brengle (qualifying competition)

=== Qualifiers ===
1. (United States) Melanie Oudin
2. (Kazakhstan) Sesil Karatantcheva
3. (Switzerland) Amra Sadiković
4. (France) Julie Coin

=== Qualifying draw ===
==== First qualifier ====
First round
1 | (United States) Melanie Oudin | 6 | 6
(Canada) Sonja Molnar | 4 | 2
(Japan) Naomi Osaka | 4 | 2
(Canada) Gabriela Dabrowski | 6 | 6
WC | (United States) Nicole Melichar | 4 | 7^{7} | 6
(Japan) Sachie Ishizu | 6 | 6^{0} | 4
WC | (Canada) Françoise Abanda | 2 | 0
8 | (United States) Madison Brengle | 6 | 6

Second round
1 | (United States) Melanie Oudin | 6 | 6
(Canada) Gabriela Dabrowski | 1 | 4
WC | (United States) Nicole Melichar | 0 | 2
8 | (United States) Madison Brengle | 6 | 6

Qualifying competition
1 | (United States) Melanie Oudin | 6 | 3 | 6
8 | (United States) Madison Brengle | 0 | 6 | 2

==== Second qualifier ====
First round
2 | (Russia) Alla Kudryavtseva | 6^{6} | 4
(United States) Coco Vandeweghe | 7^{8} | 6
(Canada) Carol Zhao | 6^{5} | 6 | 6
(Canada) Jillian O'Neill | 7^{7} | 3 | 4
(Slovenia) Petra Rampre | 6 | 7^{9}
(United States) Asia Muhammad | 4 | 6^{7}
(Canada) Élisabeth Fournier | 2 | 2
5 | (Kazakhstan) Sesil Karatantcheva | 6 | 6

Second round
(United States) Coco Vandeweghe | 5 | 6 | 6
(Canada) Carol Zhao | 7 | 4 | 4
(Slovenia) Petra Rampre | 2 | 4
5 | (Kazakhstan) Sesil Karatantcheva | 6 | 6

Qualifying competition
(United States) Coco Vandeweghe | 6 | 4 | 2
5 | (Kazakhstan) Sesil Karatantcheva | 1 | 6 | 6

==== Third qualifier ====
First round
3 | (United States) Grace Min | 6 | 6
(United States) Chiara Scholl | 2 | 2
(United States) Allie Will | 1 | 0
(Croatia) Tereza Mrdeža | 6 | 6
(United States) Alexandra Mueller | 6^{7} | 7^{7} | 7^{11}
(United States) Alexandra Stevenson | 7^{9} | 6^{3} | 6^{9}
(Switzerland) Amra Sadiković | 6 | 1 | 6
6 | (United States) Irina Falconi | 3 | 6 | 2

Second round
3 | (United States) Grace Min | 6 | 6
(Croatia) Tereza Mrdeža | 2 | 2
(United States) Alexandra Mueller | 4 | 4
(Switzerland) Amra Sadiković | 6 | 6

Qualifying competition
3 | (United States) Grace Min | 6^{5} | 3
(Switzerland) Amra Sadiković | 7^{7} | 6

==== Fourth qualifier ====
First round
4 | (France) Julie Coin | 6 | 6
WC | (Canada) Petra Januskova | 0 | 0
(Germany) Kristina Barrois | 6 | 6^{2} | 6
(United States) Jennifer Elie | 1 | 7^{7} | 3
(United States) Nicole Gibbs | 6 | 4 | 5
(United States) Chieh-yu Hsu | 3 | 6 | 7
WC | (Canada) Khristina Blajkevitch | 2 | 3
7 | (Colombia) Catalina Castaño | 6 | 6

Second round
4 | (France) Julie Coin | 7^{7} | 6
(Germany) Kristina Barrois | 6^{5} | 4
(United States) Chieh-yu Hsu | 6 | 4 | 7^{7}
7 | (Colombia) Catalina Castaño | 3 | 6 | 6^{2}

Qualifying competition
4 | (France) Julie Coin | 6 | 6
(United States) Chieh-yu Hsu | 2 | 0
