= Barbora Strýcová career statistics =

Career finals
Discipline	Type	Won	Lost	Total
Singles	Grand Slam	–	–	–
Singles	WTA Finals	–	–	–
Singles	WTA 1000	–	–	–
Singles	WTA 500 & 250	2	6	8
Singles	Olympics	–	–	–
Singles	Total	2	6	8
Doubles	Grand Slam	2	1	3
Doubles	WTA Finals	0	1	1
Doubles	WTA 1000	8	4	12
Doubles	WTA 500 & 250	23	13	36
Doubles	Olympics	–	–	–
Doubles	Total	32	19	51

This is a list of career statistics of the former professional Czech tennis player Barbora Strýcová since her professional debut in 2002.

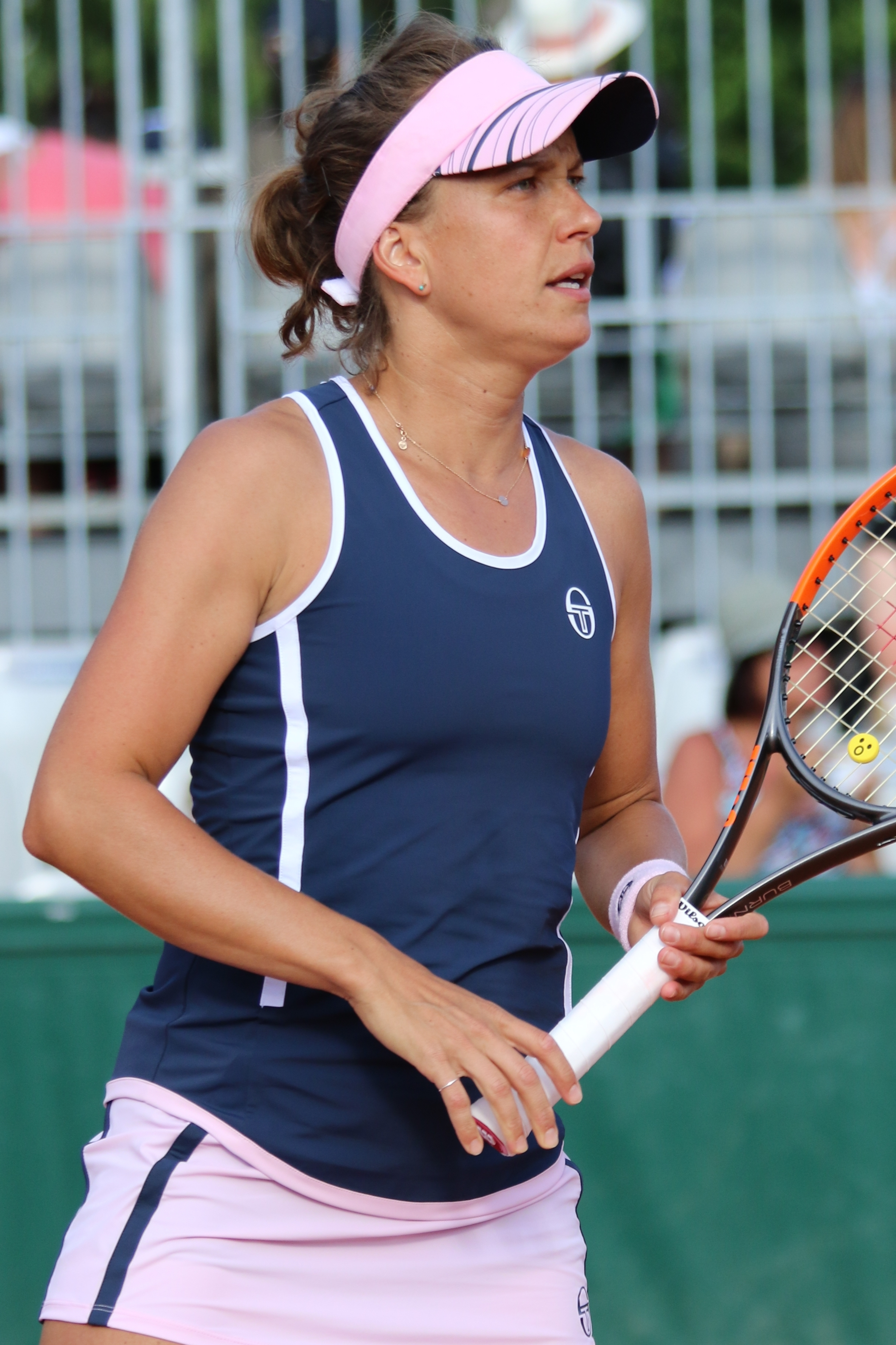
Strýcová at the 2018 French Open

== Career achievements ==
In her career, Strýcová won two singles titles, and 32 doubles titles on the WTA Tour, plus 2 Grand Slam doubles title at the 2019 Wimbledon Championships and Wimbledon again in 2023, partnering with Hsieh Su-wei. On ITF Circuit, she won nine singles titles, and ten doubles titles. As a part of Czech Fed Cup team, Strýcová won six titles, but in only three of them played in the finals.

=== Year-end championships ===
In doubles, Strýcová debut at the WTA Finals, in 2018, where she was stopped in semifinals. Year later, in 2019, Strýcová together with Hsieh Su-wei reached final at the WTA Finals, where they lost against Tímea Babos-Kristina Mladenovic.

=== Grand Slam championships ===
Strýcová reached two Grand Slam finals, with score of 1–1 win-loss. The first final that she reached was at the 2019 Wimbledon Championships, where she won the title alongside Hsieh Su-wei. In 2020, she reached her second Grand Slam final, at the Australian Open, but ended runner-up.

Barbora also reached a total of six semifinals, five in doubles and one in singles. Semifinal in singles was in 2019 at Wimbledon, where she lost against Serena Williams.

== Performance timelines ==
Key
W	F	SF	QF	#R	RR	Q#	P#	DNQ	A	Z#	PO	G	S	B	NMS	NTI	P	NH

(W) winner; (F) finalist; (SF) semifinalist; (QF) quarterfinalist; (#R) rounds 4, 3, 2, 1; (RR) round-robin stage; (Q#) qualification round; (P#) preliminary round; (DNQ) did not qualify; (A) absent; (Z#) Davis/Fed Cup Zonal Group (with number indication) or (PO) play-off; (G) gold, (S) silver or (B) bronze Olympic/Paralympic medal; (NMS) not a Masters tournament; (NTI) not a Tier I tournament; (P) postponed; (NH) not held; (SR) strike rate (events won / competed); (W–L) win–loss record.

Only main-draw results in WTA Tour, Grand Slam tournaments, Billie Jean King Cup, United Cup, Hopman Cup and Olympic Games are included in win–loss records.

=== Singles ===
Tournament	2002	2003	2004	2005	2006	2007	2008	2009	2010	2011	2012	2013	2014	2015	2016	2017	2018	2019	2020	2021	SR	W–L	Win %
Grand Slam tournaments
Australian Open	A	Q2	2R	1R	Q2	Q2	Q2	1R	2R	3R	2R	A	2R	3R	4R	4R	4R	1R	1R	1R	0 / 14	17–14	55%
French Open	A	A	2R	1R	Q3	Q1	Q1	1R	1R	1R	1R	1R	1R	1R	3R	2R	4R	1R	2R	A	0 / 14	8–14	36%
Wimbledon	A	1R	1R	2R	Q3	1R	3R	1R	3R	2R	1R	2R	QF	1R	3R	2R	3R	SF	NH	A	0 / 16	21–16	57%
US Open	A	Q3	1R	1R	Q2	Q1	1R	2R	1R	1R	1R	Q1	3R	3R	1R	2R	3R	1R	A	A	0 / 13	8–13	38%
Win–loss	0–0	0–1	2–4	1–4	0–0	0–1	2–2	1–4	3–4	3–4	1–4	1–2	7–4	4–4	7–4	6–4	10–4	5–4	1–2	0–1	0 / 57	54–57	49%
Year-end championships
WTA Elite Trophy (Note: WTA Tournament of Champions was held from 2009 to 2014, when WTA Elite Trophy replaced it.)	Not Held							Did Not Qualify							RR	RR	DNQ		Not Held		0 / 2	2–2	50%
National representation
Summer Olympics	Not Held		1R	Not Held			A	Not Held			A	Not Held			2R	Not Held				A	0 / 2	1–2	33%
Billie Jean King Cup (Note: Formerly known as Fed Cup until 2020.)	1R	1R	1R	A	PO	PO	A	A	A	W (Note: Strýcová didn't play in the final, but was part of team because she played matches in previous rounds.)	W	A	W	W	W	SF	W	A	A		6 / 10	11–7	61%
WTA 1000 tournaments
Dubai / Qatar Open (Note: The first Premier 5 event of the year has switched back and forth between the Dubai Tennis Championships and the Qatar Open since 2009. Dubai was classified as a Premier 5 event from 2009 to 2011 before being succeeded by Doha for the 2012–2014 period. In 2015, Dubai regained its Premier 5 status while Doha was demoted to Premier status. The Premier 5 tournaments were reclassified as WTA 1000 tournaments in 2021.)	Not Tier I						A	A	A	A	1R	A	A	2R	2R	2R	2R	1R	2R	A	0 / 7	4–7	36%
Indian Wells Open	A	A	4R	1R	Q2	A	1R	1R	2R	3R	2R	A	2R	2R	4R	3R	2R	2R	NH	A	0 / 13	13–13	50%
Miami Open	A	A	2R	1R	A	A	Q1	2R	1R	2R	2R	A	3R	2R	2R	4R	2R	1R	NH	A	0 / 12	9–12	43%
Madrid Open	Not Held							Q1	Q1	1R	Q1	A	A	3R	2R	2R	1R	1R	NH	A	0 / 6	4–6	40%
Italian Open	A	A	A	A	A	A	A	A	A	1R	A	A	A	1R	QF	2R	1R	1R	2R	A	0 / 7	5–7	42%
Canadian Open	A	A	1R	A	A	A	A	A	Q2	Q2	Q2	A	2R	2R	2R	3R	1R	A	NH	A	0 / 6	5–6	45%
Cincinnati Open	Not Held		Not Tier I					A	A	Q1	A	A	2R	1R	3R	1R	1R	1R	A	A	0 / 6	3–6	33%
Pan Pacific / Wuhan Open^{(Note: In 2014, the Toray Pan Pacific Open was downgraded to a Premier event and replaced by the Wuhan Open. The Premier 5 tournaments were reclassified as WTA 1000 tournaments in 2021.)}	A	A	A	A	A	A	A	A	1R	2R	1R	1R	3R	3R	QF	2R	2R	2R	Not Held		0 / 10	11–10	52%
China Open	Not Held		Not Tier I					A	1R	1R	A	A	1R	1R	2R	QF	1R	1R	Not Held		0 / 8	4–8	33%
Career statistics
	2002	2003	2004	2005	2006	2007	2008	2009	2010	2011	2012	2013	2014	2015	2016	2017	2018	2019	2020	2021	SR	W–L	Win %
Tournaments	0	1	16	15	1	5	9	20	22	27	21	6	23	26	23	25	23	20	8	2	Career total: 293		
Titles	0	0	0	0	0	0	0	0	0	1	0	0	0	0	0	1	0	0	0	0	Career total: 2		
Finals	0	0	0	0	0	0	0	0	1	1	1	0	2	0	2	1	0	0	0	0	Career total: 8		
Hard win–loss	0–0	0–0	9–10	2–8	0–0	0–0	1–5	5–8	5–11	18–19	6–13	3–3	19–15	22–17	25–18	31–17	17–15	5–12	3–5	0–2	2 / 176	171–178	49%
Clay win–loss	0–0	0–0	6–5	5–6	0–1	3–4	2–3	7–9	9–9	5–7	7–6	1–2	1–6	6–6	8–4	7–5	3–5	6–5	2–3	0–0	0 / 84	78–86	48%
Grass win–loss	0–0	0–1	0–2	1–1	0–0	0–1	2–1	1–3	2–2	1–2	0–2	1–1	9–3	3–3	6–2	5–3	6–3	8–3	0–0	0–0	0 / 33	45–33	58%
Overall win–loss	0–0	0–1	15–17	8–15	0–1	3–5	5–9	13–20	16–22	24–28	13–21	5–6	29–24	31–26	39–24	43–25	26–23	19–20	5–8	0–2	2 / 293	294–297	50%
Win (%)	–	0%	47%	35%	0%	38%	36%	39%	42%	46%	38%	45%	55%	54%	62%	63%	53%	49%	38%	0%	Career total: 50%		
Year-end ranking	222	161	56	142	164	156	76	69	67	44	92	92	26	41	20	23	33	33	37	336	$12,057,535		

=== Doubles ===
Tournament	2004	2005	2006	2007	2008	2009	2010	2011	2012	2013	2014	2015	2016	2017	2018	2019	2020	2021	SR	W–L	Win%
Grand Slam tournaments
Australian Open	A	A	1R	1R	3R	2R	2R	3R	2R	A	2R	SF	3R	3R	QF	SF	F	2R	0 / 15	29–15	66%
French Open	A	2R	3R	1R	1R	2R	3R	1R	1R	1R	2R	QF	2R	A	SF	3R	3R	A	0 / 15	19–15	56%
Wimbledon	A	3R	2R	2R	A	3R	3R	3R	2R	QF	2R	3R	3R	3R	3R	W	NH	A	1 / 14	29–13	69%
US Open	A	1R	1R	1R	1R	2R	3R	QF	2R	2R	SF	3R	QF	SF	3R	3R	A	A	0 / 15	25–15	63%
Win–loss	0–0	3–3	3–4	1–4	2–3	5–4	7–4	7–4	3–4	4–3	7–4	11–4	8–4	8–3	11–4	14–3	7–2	1–1	1 / 59	102–58	64%
Year-end championships
WTA Finals	Did Not Qualify														SF	F	NH	DNQ	0 / 2	4–3	57%
National representation
Olympic Games	A	Not Held			A	Not Held			A	Not Held			SF-B	Not Held				A	0 / 1	4–1	80%
WTA 1000 tournaments
Dubai / Qatar Open	Not Tier I				A	A	A	A	2R	A	A	1R	2R (Note: Strýcová-Kvitová withdrew before second-round match, at the 2016 Qatar Open, is not counted as a loss.)	SF	2R	W	W	A	2 / 7	12–5	71%
Indian Wells Open	A	A	SF	2R	1R	QF	QF	2R	SF	A	QF	2R	1R	QF	W	QF	NH	A	1 / 13	24–12	67%
Miami Open	A	A	2R	A	2R	1R	1R	2R	1R	A	2R	1R	QF	F	1R	2R	NH	A	0 / 12	11–12	48%
Madrid Open	Not Held					A	1R	1R	1R	A	A	1R	1R	1R	SF	W	NH	A	1 / 8	7–7	50%
Italian Open	A	A	A	A	A	A	A	2R	A	A	A	1R	1R	1R	F	2R	W	A	1 / 7	9–6	60%
Canadian Open	1R	A	A	A	A	QF	QF	1R	1R	QF	QF	2R	2R	SF	2R	A	NH	A	0 / 11	12–11	52%
Cincinnati Open	Not Tier I					A	A	1R	1R	SF	2R	2R	W	SF	QF	QF (Note: Strýcová-Hsieh withdrew before quarterfinal match, at the 2019 Cincinnati Open, is not counted as a loss.)	A	A	1 / 9	13–7	65%
Pan Pacific / Wuhan Open	A	A	A	A	A	A	W	1R	SF	QF	2R	A	F	1R	F	2R	Not Held		1 / 9	13–8	62%
China Open	Not Tier I					A	QF	2R	QF	2R	A	1R	2R	QF	W	2R	Not Held		1 / 9	12–8	60%
Career statistics
	2004	2005	2006	2007	2008	2009	2010	2011	2012	2013	2014	2015	2016	2017	2018	2019	2020	2021	SR	W–L	Win%
Tournaments	5	13	10	12	14	18	24	24	23	9	16	18	20	16	21	17	7	2	Career total: 269		
Titles	0	2	0	0	1	2	5	5	2	0	0	0	3	0	3	4	4	0	Career total: 31		
Finals	0	4	1	0	2	4	8	5	3	0	0	0	5	2	6	5	5	0	Career total: 50		
Hard win–loss	1–5	3–6	10–7	2–5	13–10	19–7	29–9	25–14	21–15	7–5	15–11	13–11	30–10	25–12	28–10	18–10	17–1	1–2	19 / 172	277–150	65%
Clay win–loss	0–0	16–4	3–2	5–7	2–3	11–7	12–8	5–4	9–4	2–3	6–4	4–4	1–4	0–2	12–3	9–2	6–2	0–0	8 / 73	103–63	62%
Grass win–loss	0–0	2–1	1–1	1–1	0–0	2–1	2–2	6–1	3–2	3–1	2–2	3–2	6–1	3–1	2–3	10–0	0–0	0–0	4 / 24	46–19	71%
Overall win–loss	1–5	21–11	14–10	8–13	15–13	32–15	43–19	36–19	33–21	12–9	23–17	20–17	37–15	28–15	42–16	37–12	23–3	1–2	31 / 269	426–232	65%
Win (%)	17%	66%	58%	38%	54%	68%	69%	65%	61%	57%	58%	54%	71%	65%	72%	76%	88%	33%	Career total: 65%		
Year-end ranking^{(Note: 2003: WTA ranking–339.)}	179	43	54	80	66	35	20	22	20	44	32	28	17	15	5	1	2	26			

=== Mixed doubles ===
Tournament	2009	2010	2011	2012	...	2015	...	2020	2021	SR	W–L	Win%
Australian Open	A	QF	2R	A		1R		1R	1R	0 / 5	3–5	38%
French Open	A	2R	2R	A		A		NH	A	0 / 2	2–2	50%
Wimbledon	2R	1R	2R	A		1R		NH	A	0 / 4	1–4	20%
US Open	A	A	QF	1R		A		NH	A	0 / 2	2–2	50%
Win–loss	1–1	3–3	4–4	0–1		0–2		0–1	0–1	0 / 13	8–13	38%

== Grand Slam tournaments finals ==
=== Doubles: 3 (2 titles, 1 runner-up) ===
Result	Year	Tournament	Surface	Partner	Opponents	Score
Win	2019	Wimbledon	Grass	(Chinese Taipei) Hsieh Su-wei	(Canada) Gabriela Dabrowski (China) Xu Yifan	6–2, 6–4
Loss	2020	Australian Open	Hard	(Chinese Taipei) Hsieh Su-wei	(Hungary) Tímea Babos (France) Kristina Mladenovic	2–6, 1–6
Win	2023	Wimbledon (2)	Grass	(Chinese Taipei) Hsieh Su-wei	(Australia) Storm Hunter (Belgium) Elise Mertens	7–5, 6–4

== Other significant finals ==
=== Year-end championships finals ===
==== Doubles: 1 (1 runner–up) ====
Result	Year	Tournament	Surface	Partner	Opponents	Score
Loss	2019	WTA Finals, Shenzhen	Hard (i)	(Chinese Taipei) Hsieh Su-wei	(Hungary) Tímea Babos (France) Kristina Mladenovic	1–6, 3–6

=== WTA 1000 tournaments ===
==== Doubles: 12 (8 titles, 4 runner-ups) ====
Result	Year	Tournament	Surface	Partner	Opponents	Score
Win	2010	Pan Pacific Open	Hard	(Czech Republic) Iveta Benešová	(Israel) Shahar Pe'er (China) Peng Shuai	6–4, 4–6, [10–8]
Win	2016	Cincinnati Open	Hard	(India) Sania Mirza	(Switzerland) Martina Hingis (United States) CoCo Vandeweghe	7–5, 6–4
Loss	2016	Wuhan Open	Hard	(India) Sania Mirza	(United States) Bethanie Mattek-Sands (Czech Republic) Lucie Šafářová	1–6, 4–6
Loss	2017	Miami Open	Hard	(India) Sania Mirza	(Canada) Gabriela Dabrowski (China) Xu Yifan	4–6, 3–6
Win	2018	Indian Wells Open	Hard	(Chinese Taipei) Hsieh Su-wei	(Russia) Ekaterina Makarova (Russia) Elena Vesnina	6–4, 6–4
Loss	2018	Italian Open	Clay	(Czech Republic) Andrea Sestini Hlaváčková	(Australia) Ashleigh Barty (Netherlands) Demi Schuurs	3–6, 4–6
Loss	2018	Wuhan Open	Hard	(Czech Republic) Andrea Sestini Hlaváčková	(Belgium) Elise Mertens (Netherlands) Demi Schuurs	3–6, 3–6
Win	2018	China Open	Hard	(Czech Republic) Andrea Sestini Hlaváčková	(Canada) Gabriela Dabrowski (China) Xu Yifan	4–6, 6–4, [10–8]
Win	2019	Dubai Championships	Hard	(Chinese Taipei) Hsieh Su-wei	(Czech Republic) Lucie Hradecká (Russia) Ekaterina Makarova	6–4, 6–4
Win	2019	Madrid Open	Clay	(Chinese Taipei) Hsieh Su-wei	(Canada) Gabriela Dabrowski (China) Xu Yifan	6–3, 6–1
Win	2020	Qatar Open	Hard	(Chinese Taipei) Hsieh Su-wei	(Canada) Gabriela Dabrowski (Latvia) Jeļena Ostapenko	6–2, 5–7, [10–2]
Win	2020	Italian Open	Clay	(Chinese Taipei) Hsieh Su-wei	(Germany) Anna-Lena Friedsam (Romania) Raluca Olaru	6–2, 6–2

=== Summer Olympics ===
==== Doubles: 1 (bronze medal) ====
Result	Year	Tournament	Surface	Partner	Opponents	Score
Bronze	2016	Rio Summer Olympics	Hard	(Czech Republic) Lucie Šafářová	(Czech Republic) Andrea Hlaváčková (Czech Republic) Lucie Hradecká	7–5, 6–1

== WTA career finals ==
=== Singles: 8 (2 titles, 6 runner-ups) ===
Legend Premier (0–3) International (2–3)	Finals by surface Hard (1–2) Clay (0–2) Grass (0–2) Carpet (1–0)

Result	W–L	Date	Tournament	Tier	Surface	Opponent	Score
Loss	0–1	Jul 2010	Prague Open, Czech Republic	International	Clay	(Hungary) Ágnes Szávay	2–6, 6–1, 2–6
Win	1–1	Sep 2011	Tournoi de Québec, Canada	International	Carpet (i)	(New Zealand) Marina Erakovic	4–6, 6–1, 6–0
Loss	1–2	Jul 2012	Palermo International, Italy	International	Clay	(Italy) Sara Errani	1–6, 3–6
Loss	1–3	Jun 2014	Birmingham Classic, UK	Premier	Grass	(Serbia) Ana Ivanovic	3–6, 2–6
Loss	1–4	Oct 2014	Luxembourg Open, Luxembourg	International	Hard (i)	(Germany) Annika Beck	2–6, 1–6
Loss	1–5	Feb 2016	Dubai Championships, UAE	Premier	Hard	(Italy) Sara Errani	0–6, 2–6
Loss	1–6	Jun 2016	Birmingham Classic, UK	Premier	Grass	(United States) Madison Keys	3–6, 4–6
Win	2–6	Oct 2017	Ladies Linz, Austria	International	Hard (i)	(Slovakia) Magdaléna Rybáriková	6–4, 6–1

=== Doubles: 51 (32 titles, 19 runner-ups) ===
Legend Grand Slam (2–1) WTA Finals (0–1) Premier Mandatory & Premier 5 (8–4) Tier II / Premier (10–2) Tier III & IV / International (12–11)	Finals by surface Hard (18–14) Clay (8–5) Grass (5–0) Carpet (1–0)

Result	W–L	Date	Tournament	Tier	Surface	Partner	Opponents	Score
Loss	0–1	Feb 2005	Copa Colsanitas, Colombia	Tier III	Clay	(Slovakia) Ľubomíra Kurhajcová	(Switzerland) Emmanuelle Gagliardi (Slovenia) Tina Pisnik	4–6, 3–6
Win	1–1	May 2005	Warsaw Open, Poland	Tier II	Clay	(Ukraine) Tatiana Perebiynis	(Poland) Klaudia Jans (Poland) Alicja Rosolska	6–1, 6–4
Win	2–1	May 2005	Grand Prix Lalla Meryem, Morocco	Tier IV	Clay	(France) Émilie Loit	(Spain) Lourdes Domínguez Lino (Spain) Nuria Llagostera Vives	3–6, 7–6^{(8–6)}, 7–5
Loss	2–2	May 2005	Prague Open, Czech Republic	Tier IV	Clay	(Croatia) Jelena Kostanić	(Australia) Nicole Pratt (France) Émilie Loit	7–6^{(8–6)}, 4–6, 4–6
Loss	2–3	Jan 2006	Auckland Classic, New Zealand	Tier IV	Hard	(France) Émilie Loit	(Russia) Elena Likhovtseva (Russia) Vera Zvonareva	3–6, 4–6
Loss	2–4	Jan 2008	Auckland Classic, New Zealand	Tier IV	Hard	(Germany) Martina Müller	(United States) Lilia Osterloh (Russia) Mariya Koryttseva	3–6, 4–6
Win	3–4	Aug 2008	Nordic Light Open, Sweden	Tier IV	Hard	(Czech Republic) Iveta Benešová	(Czech Republic) Petra Cetkovská (Czech Republic) Lucie Šafářová	7–5, 6–4
Loss	3–5	Mar 2009	Monterrey Open, Mexico	International	Hard	(Czech Republic) Iveta Benešová	(France) Nathalie Dechy (Italy) Mara Santangelo	3–6, 4–6
Loss	3–6	Jul 2009	Prague Open, Czech Republic	International	Clay	(Czech Republic) Iveta Benešová	(Ukraine) Kateryna Bondarenko (Ukraine) Alona Bondarenko	1–6, 2–6
Win	4–6	Sep 2009	Tournoi de Québec, Canada	International	Carpet	(United States) Vania King	(Sweden) Sofia Arvidsson (France) Séverine Beltrame	6–1, 6–3
Win	5–6	Oct 2009	Luxembourg Open, Luxembourg	International	Hard (i)	(Czech Republic) Iveta Benešová	(Czech Republic) Vladimíra Uhlířová (Czech Republic) Renata Voráčová	6–1, 0–6, [10–7]
Win	6–6	Feb 2010	Open GDF Suez, France	Premier	Hard (i)	(Czech Republic) Iveta Benešová	(Zimbabwe) Cara Black (United States) Liezel Huber	w/o
Win	7–6	Feb 2010	Abierto Mexicano Telcel, Mexico	International	Clay	(Slovenia) Polona Hercog	(Italy) Sara Errani (Italy) Roberta Vinci	2–6, 6–1, [10–2]
Win	8–6	Mar 2010	Monterrey Open, Mexico	International	Hard	(Czech Republic) Iveta Benešová	(Germany) Anna-Lena Grönefeld (United States) Vania King	3–6, 6–4, [10–8]
Loss	8–7	Jul 2010	Swedish Open, Sweden	International	Clay	(Czech Republic) Renata Voráčová	(Argentina) Gisela Dulko (Italy) Flavia Pennetta	6–7^{(0–7)}, 0–6
Loss	8–8	Sep 2010	Tournoi de Québec, Canada	International	Hard	(United States) Bethanie Mattek-Sands	(Sweden) Sofia Arvidsson (Sweden) Johanna Larsson	1–6, 6–2, 6–10
Win	9–8	Oct 2010	Pan Pacific Open, Japan	Premier 5	Hard	(Czech Republic) Iveta Benešová	(Israel) Shahar Pe'er (China) Peng Shuai	6–4, 4–6, [10–8]
Win	10–8	Oct 2010	Ladies Linz, Austria	International	Hard (i)	(Czech Republic) Renata Voráčová	(Czech Republic) Květa Peschke (Slovenia) Katarina Srebotnik	7–5, 7–6^{(8–6)}
Loss	10–9	Oct 2010	Luxembourg Open, Luxembourg	International	Hard (i)	(Czech Republic) Iveta Benešová	(Switzerland) Timea Bacsinszky (Italy) Tathiana Garbin	4–6, 4–6
Win	11–9	Jan 2011	Sydney International, Australia	Premier	Hard	(Czech Republic) Iveta Benešová	(Czech Republic) Květa Peschke (Slovenia) Katarina Srebotnik	4–6, 6–4, [10–7]
Win	12–9	Mar 2011	Monterrey Open, Mexico (2)	International	Hard	(Czech Republic) Iveta Benešová	(Germany) Anna-Lena Grönefeld (United States) Vania King	6–7^{(8–10)}, 6–2, [10–6]
Win	13–9	May 2011	Barcelona Open, Spain	International	Clay	(Czech Republic) Iveta Benešová	(South Africa) Natalie Grandin (Czech Republic) Vladimíra Uhlířová	5–7, 6–4, [11–9]
Win	14–9	Jun 2011	Rosmalen Open, Netherlands	International	Grass	(Czech Republic) Klára Zakopalová	(Slovakia) Dominika Cibulková (Italy) Flavia Pennetta	1–6, 6–4, [10–7]
Win	15–9	Oct 2011	Luxembourg Open, Luxembourg (2)	International	Hard (i)	(Czech Republic) Iveta Benešová	(Czech Republic) Lucie Hradecká (Russia) Ekaterina Makarova	7–5, 6–3
Win	16–9	Apr 2012	Stuttgart Grand Prix, Germany	Premier	Clay	(Czech Republic) Iveta Benešová	(Germany) Julia Görges (Germany) Anna-Lena Grönefeld	6–4, 7–5
Win	17–9	Jul 2012	Palermo International, Italy	International	Clay	(Czech Republic) Renata Voráčová	(Croatia) Darija Jurak (Hungary) Katalin Marosi	7–6^{(7–5)}, 6–4
Loss	17–10	Oct 2012	Ladies Linz, Austria	International	Hard (i)	(Germany) Julia Görges	(Germany) Anna-Lena Grönefeld (Czech Republic) Květa Peschke	3–6, 4–6
Loss	17–11	Jan 2016	Auckland Classic, New Zealand	International	Hard	(Montenegro) Danka Kovinić	(Belgium) An-Sophie Mestach (Belgium) Elise Mertens	6–2, 3–6, [5–10]
Win	18–11	Jun 2016	Birmingham Classic, UK	Premier	Grass	(Czech Republic) Karolína Plíšková	(United States) Vania King (Russia) Alla Kudryavtseva	6–3, 7–6^{(7–1)}
Win	19–11	Aug 2016	Cincinnati Open, U.S.	Premier 5	Hard	(India) Sania Mirza	(Switzerland) Martina Hingis (United States) CoCo Vandeweghe	7–5, 6–4
Win	20–11	Sep 2016	Pan Pacific Open, Japan (2)	Premier	Hard	(India) Sania Mirza	(China) Liang Chen (China) Yang Zhaoxuan	6–1, 6–1
Loss	20–12	Oct 2016	Wuhan Open, China	Premier 5	Hard	(India) Sania Mirza	(United States) Bethanie Mattek-Sands (Czech Republic) Lucie Šafářová	1–6, 4–6
Loss	20–13	Jan 2017	Sydney International, Australia	Premier	Hard	(India) Sania Mirza	(Hungary) Tímea Babos (Russia) Anastasia Pavlyuchenkova	4–6, 4–6
Loss	20–14	Apr 2017	Miami Open, U.S.	Premier M	Hard	(India) Sania Mirza	(Canada) Gabriela Dabrowski (China) Xu Yifan	4–6, 3–6
Win	21–14	Mar 2018	Indian Wells Open, U.S.	Premier M	Hard	(Chinese Taipei) Hsieh Su-wei	(Russia) Ekaterina Makarova (Russia) Elena Vesnina	6–4, 6–4
Loss	21–15	May 2018	Italian Open, Italy	Premier 5	Clay	(Czech Republic) Andrea Sestini Hlaváčková	(Australia) Ashleigh Barty (Netherlands) Demi Schuurs	3–6, 4–6
Win	22–15	Aug 2018	Connecticut Open, U.S.	Premier	Hard	(Czech Republic) Andrea Sestini Hlaváčková	(Chinese Taipei) Hsieh Su-wei (Germany) Laura Siegemund	6–4, 6–7^{(7–9)}, [10–4]
Loss	22–16	Sep 2018	Pan Pacific Open, Japan	Premier	Hard (i)	(Czech Republic) Andrea Sestini Hlaváčková	(Japan) Miyu Kato (Japan) Makoto Ninomiya	4–6, 4–6
Loss	22–17	Sep 2018	Wuhan Open, China	Premier 5	Hard	(Czech Republic) Andrea Sestini Hlaváčková	(Belgium) Elise Mertens (Netherlands) Demi Schuurs	3–6, 3–6
Win	23–17	Oct 2018	China Open, China	Premier M	Hard	(Czech Republic) Andrea Sestini Hlaváčková	(Canada) Gabriela Dabrowski (China) Xu Yifan	4–6, 6–4, [10–8]
Win	24–17	Feb 2019	Dubai Championships, UAE	Premier 5	Hard	(Chinese Taipei) Hsieh Su-wei	(Czech Republic) Lucie Hradecká (Russia) Ekaterina Makarova	6–4, 6–4
Win	25–17	May 2019	Madrid Open, Spain	Premier M	Clay	(Chinese Taipei) Hsieh Su-wei	(Canada) Gabriela Dabrowski (China) Xu Yifan	6–3, 6–1
Win	26–17	Jun 2019	Birmingham Classic, UK (2)	Premier	Grass	(Chinese Taipei) Hsieh Su-wei	(Germany) Anna-Lena Grönefeld (Netherlands) Demi Schuurs	6–4, 6–7^{(4–7)}, [10–8]
Win	27–17	Jul 2019	Wimbledon, UK	Grand Slam	Grass	(Chinese Taipei) Hsieh Su-wei	(Canada) Gabriela Dabrowski (China) Xu Yifan	6–2, 6–4
Loss	27–18	Nov 2019	WTA Finals, China	Finals	Hard (i)	(Chinese Taipei) Hsieh Su-wei	(Hungary) Tímea Babos (France) Kristina Mladenovic	1–6, 3–6
Win	28–18	Jan 2020	Brisbane International, Australia	Premier	Hard	(Chinese Taipei) Hsieh Su-wei	(Australia) Ashleigh Barty (Netherlands) Kiki Bertens	3–6, 7–6^{(9–7)}, [10–8]
Loss	28–19	Jan 2020	Australian Open, Australia	Grand Slam	Hard	(Chinese Taipei) Hsieh Su-wei	(Hungary) Tímea Babos (France) Kristina Mladenovic	2–6, 1–6
Win	29–19	Feb 2020	Dubai Championships, UAE (2)	Premier	Hard	(Chinese Taipei) Hsieh Su-wei	(Czech Republic) Barbora Krejčíková (China) Zheng Saisai	7–5, 3–6, [10–5]
Win	30–19	Feb 2020	Qatar Open, Qatar	Premier 5	Hard	(Chinese Taipei) Hsieh Su-wei	(Latvia) Jeļena Ostapenko (Canada) Gabriela Dabrowski	6–2, 5–7, [10–2]
Win	31–19	Sep 2020	Italian Open, Italy	Premier 5	Clay	(Chinese Taipei) Hsieh Su-wei	(Germany) Anna-Lena Friedsam (Romania) Raluca Olaru	6–2, 6–2
Win	32–19	Jul 2023	Wimbledon, UK (2)	Grand Slam	Grass	(Chinese Taipei) Hsieh Su-wei	(Australia) Storm Hunter (Belgium) Elise Mertens	7–5, 6–4

=== Team competition: 6 (6 titles) ===
Result	W–L	Date	Tournament	Surface	Partners/Team	Opponent	Score
Win	1–0	Nov 2011	Fed Cup, Moscow, Russia	Hard (i)	(Czech Republic) Lucie Šafářová (Czech Republic) Květa Peschke (Czech Republic) Lucie Hradecká (Czech Republic) Petra Kvitová	(Russia) Anastasia Pavlyuchenkova (Russia) Svetlana Kuznetsova (Russia) Maria Kirilenko (Russia) Elena Vesnina	3–2
Win	2–0	Nov 2012	Fed Cup, Prague, Czech Republic (2)	Hard (i)	(Czech Republic) Lucie Šafářová (Czech Republic) Lucie Hradecká (Czech Republic) Andrea Hlaváčková (Czech Republic) Petra Kvitová	(Serbia) Ana Ivanovic (Serbia) Jelena Janković (Serbia) Bojana Jovanovski (Serbia) Aleksandra Krunić	3–1
Win	3–0	Nov 2014	Fed Cup, Prague, Czech Republic (3)	Hard (i)	(Czech Republic) Lucie Šafářová (Czech Republic) Lucie Hradecká (Czech Republic) Andrea Hlaváčková (Czech Republic) Petra Kvitová	(Germany) Angelique Kerber (Germany) Andrea Petkovic (Germany) Sabine Lisicki (Germany) Julia Görges	3–1
Win	4–0	Nov 2015	Fed Cup, Prague, Czech Republic (4)	Hard (i)	(Czech Republic) Lucie Šafářová (Czech Republic) Karolína Plíšková (Czech Republic) Petra Kvitová	(Russia) Anastasia Pavlyuchenkova (Russia) Maria Sharapova (Russia) Ekaterina Makarova (Russia) Elena Vesnina	3–2
Win	5–0	Nov 2016	Fed Cup, Strasbourg, France (5)	Hard (i)	(Czech Republic) Lucie Hradecká (Czech Republic) Karolína Plíšková (Czech Republic) Petra Kvitová	(France) Caroline Garcia (France) Kristina Mladenovic (France) Alizé Cornet (France) Pauline Parmentier	3–2
Win	6–0	Nov 2018	Fed Cup, Prague, Czech Republic (6)	Hard (i)	(Czech Republic) Kateřina Siniaková (Czech Republic) Petra Kvitová (Czech Republic) Barbora Krejčíková	(United States) Danielle Collins (United States) Sofia Kenin (United States) Alison Riske (United States) Nicole Melichar	3–0

== ITF Circuit finals ==
=== Singles: 15 (9 titles, 6 runner–ups) ===
Legend 100K tournaments (1–0) 75K tournaments (1–2) 50K tournaments (2–1) 25K tournaments (5–3)	Finals by surface Hard (3–2) Clay (4–4) Carpet (2–0)

Result	W–L	Date	Tournament	Tier	Surface	Opponent	Score
Win	1–0	May 2002	ITF Edinburgh, United Kingdom	25K	Clay	(Sweden) Sofia Arvidsson	4–6, 6–4, 7–6^{(7–2)}
Loss	1–1	Aug 2002	ITF Innsbruck, Austria	25K	Clay	(Austria) Sybille Bammer	6–7^{(6–8)}, 1–6
Win	2–1	Nov 2002	ITF Cairo, Egypt	25K	Clay	(Hungary) Kyra Nagy	6–2, 6–0
Loss	2–2	Oct 2003	ITF Girona, Spain	50K	Clay	(Ukraine) Julia Vakulenko	5–7, 0–2 ret.
Win	3–2	Oct 2004	ITF Saint-Raphaël, France	50K	Hard (i)	(France) Stéphanie Cohen-Aloro	6–1, 6–2
Loss	3–3	Jun 2006	ITF Gorizia, Italy	25K	Clay	(Romania) Mădălina Gojnea	4–6, 1–6
Loss	3–4	Feb 2008	ITF Stockholm, Sweden	25K	Hard (i)	(Sweden) Johanna Larsson	6–0, 1–6, 6–7^{(1–7)}
Win	4–4	Mar 2008	ITF Fort Walton Beach, United States	25K	Hard	(United States) Melanie Oudin	6–3, 5–7, 7–6^{(7–5)}
Win	5–4	Mar 2008	ITF Redding, United States	25K	Hard	(Canada) Aleksandra Wozniak	7–6^{(7–4)}, 6–3
Win	6–4	May 2008	ITF Szczecin, Poland	25K	Clay	(Slovakia) Lenka Wienerová	6–4, 6–2
Loss	6–5	Sep 2009	ITF Albuquerque, United States	75K	Hard	(United States) Shenay Perry	5–7, 2–6
Win	7–5	Nov 2009	ITF Ortisei, Italy	100K	Carpet (i)	(Czech Republic) Klára Koukalová	7–6^{(7–4)}, 6–3
Win	8–5	Nov 2009	ITF Ismaning, Germany	50K	Carpet (i)	(Germany) Kristina Barrois	6–4, 4–6, 7–6^{(7–5)}
Win	9–5	May 2013	ITF Trnava, Slovakia	75K	Clay	(Italy) Karin Knapp	6–2, 6–4
Loss	9–6	May 2014	ITF Trnava, Slovakia	75K	Clay	(Slovakia) Anna Karolína Schmiedlová	4–6, 2–6

=== Doubles: 18 (10 titles, 8 runner–ups) ===
Legend 100K tournaments (4–1) 75K tournaments (2–1) 50K tournaments (3–4) 25K tournaments (1–2)	Finals by surface Hard (1–3) Clay (7–4) Carpet (2–1)

Result	W–L	Date	Tournament	Tier	Surface	Partner	Opponents	Score
Loss	0–1	Oct 2002	ITF Hallandale Beach, United States	25K	Clay	(Czech Republic) Petra Cetkovská	(Argentina) Gisela Dulko (Venezuela) Milagros Sequera	2–6, 5–7
Win	1–1	Dec 2003	ITF Ostrava, Czech Republic	25K	Carpet (i)	(Czech Republic) Libuše Průšová	(Czech Republic) Iveta Melzer (Czech Republic) Michaela Paštiková	6–2, 6–4
Win	2–1	Jun 2004	ITF Prostějov, Czech Republic	75K	Clay	(Czech Republic) Libuše Průšová	(China) Peng Shuai (China) Xie Yanze	6–1, 6–3
Loss	2–2	Oct 2004	ITF Saint-Raphaël, France	50K	Hard (i)	(Kazakhstan) Galina; Voskoboeva	(France) Stéphanie Cohen-Aloro (Tunisia) Selima Sfar	6–7^{(3)}, 6–2, 4–6
Win	3–2	Feb 2005	ITF Ortisei, Italy	75K	Carpet (i)	(Slovenia) Tina Pisnik	(Bosnia and Herzegovina) Mervana Jugić-Salkić (Croatia) Darija Jurak	6–2, 3–6, 7–6^{(1)}
Loss	3–3	Jun 2005	ITF Prostějov, Czech Republic	75K	Clay	(Czech Republic) Dája Bedáňová	(Ukraine) Yuliya Beygelzimer (Italy) Mara Santangelo	1–6, 6–4, 2–6
Loss	3–4	Apr 2006	ITF Civitavecchia, Italy	25K	Clay	(Ukraine) Tatiana Perebiynis	(Czech Republic) Lucie Hradecká (Germany) Martina Müller	7–6^{(9)}, 3–6, 5–7
Loss	3–5	Aug 2006	ITF Baden, Germany	50K	Clay	(Czech Republic) Libuše Průšová	(Australia) Jarmila Wolfe (Portugal) Frederica Piedade	5–7, 6–4, 6–7^{(6)}
Win	4–5	Oct 2006	ITF Biella, Italy	50K	Clay	(Czech Republic) Renata Voráčová	(Czech Republic) Lucie Hradecká (Czech Republic) Michaela Paštiková	6–3, 6–2
Loss	4–6	Oct 2006	ITF Joué-lès-Tours, France	50K	Hard	(Czech Republic) Renata Voráčová	(France) Stéphanie Cohen-Aloro (Spain) María José Martínez Sánchez	5–7, 5–7
Win	5–6	Jul 2007	ITF Contrexeville, France	50K	Clay	(Czech Republic) Renata Voráčová	(Belarus) Ekaterina Dzehalevich (Belarus) Ksenia Milevskaya	6–2, 6–2
Loss	5–7	Oct 2007	ITF Joué-lès-Tours, France	50K	Hard	(Czech Republic) Petra Cetkovská	(Poland) Klaudia Jans-Ignacik (Poland) Alicja Rosolska	3–6, 5–7
Win	6–7	Oct 2007	ITF Trnava, Slovakia	100K+H	Hard (i)	(Czech Republic) Renata Voráčová	(Australia) Anastasia Rodionova (Ukraine) Olga Savchuk	6–4, 6–4
Win	7–7	Nov 2007	ITF Deauville, France	50K	Clay	(Czech Republic) Renata Voráčová	(Uzbekistan) Akgul Amanmuradova (Belarus) Anastasiya Yakimova	6–3, 7–5
Win	8–7	Jul 2008	ITF Biella, Italy (2)	100K	Clay	(Czech Republic) Renata Voráčová	(Spain) Lourdes Domínguez Lino (Spain) Arantxa Parra Santonja	4–6, 6–0, [10–5]
Loss	8–8	Nov 2009	ITF Ortisei, Italy	100K+H	Carpet (i)	(Kazakhstan) Galina; Voskoboeva	(Switzerland) Timea Bacsinszky (Italy) Tathiana Garbin	2–6, 2–6
Win	9–8	May 2013	ITF Prague, Czech Republic	100K	Clay	(Czech Republic) Renata Voráčová	(United States) Irina Falconi (Czech Republic) Eva Hrdinová	6–4, 6–0
Win	10–8	Jul 2013	ITF Olomouc, Czech Republic	100K	Clay	(Czech Republic) Renata Voráčová	(Czech Republic) Martina Borecka (Czech Republic) Tereza Malikova	6–3, 6–4

== Junior finals ==
=== Grand Slam tournaments ===
==== Singles: 3 (2 titles, 1 runner-up) ====
Result	Year	Tournament	Surface	Opponent	Score
Win	2002	Australian Open	Hard	(Russia) Maria Sharapova	6–0, 7–5
Loss	2002	US Open	Hard	(Russia) Maria Kirilenko	4–6, 4–6
Win	2003	Australian Open (2)	Hard	(Ukraine) Viktoriya Kutuzova	0–6, 6–2, 6–2

==== Doubles: 4 (3 titles, 1 runner-up) ====
Result	Year	Tournament	Surface	Partner	Opponents	Score
Win	2001	Australian Open	Hard	(Czech Republic) Petra Cetkovská	(Russia) Anna Bastrikova; (Russia) Svetlana Kuznetsova	7–6^{(7–3)}, 1–6, 6–4
Win	2002	French Open	Clay	(Germany) Anna-Lena Grönefeld	(Chinese Taipei) Hsieh Su-wei (Russia) Svetlana Kuznetsova	7–5, 7–5
Win	2002	Wimbledon	Grass	(Belgium) Elke Clijsters	(United States) Allison Baker; (Germany) Anna-Lena Grönefeld	6–4, 5–7, 8–6
Loss	2003	Australian Open	Hard	(Czech Republic) Petra Cetkovská	(Australia) Casey Dellacqua; (Australia) Adriana Szili	3–6, 4–4 ret.

=== ITF Junior Circuit ===
==== Singles: 14 (4 titles, 10 runner–ups) ====
Legend Grade A (3–2) Grade 1 (1–4) Grade 2 (0–4)	Finals by surface Hard (3–3) Clay (1–6) Carpet (0–1)

Result	W–L	Date	Tournament	Tier	Surface	Opponent	Score
Loss	0–1	Oct 2000	Hong Kong Junior Championships	Grade 2	Hard	(Czech Republic) Petra Cetkovská	6–3, 2–6, 2–6
Loss	0–2	Mar 2001	Argentina Bowl	Grade 2	Clay	(Argentina) María José Argeri	2–6, 1–6
Loss	0–3	Apr 2001	Slovakia Cup	Grade 2	Clay	(Russia) Anna Bastrikova	6–1, 1–6, 1–6
Loss	0–4	Jun 2001	Frankfurt Junior International, Germany	Grade 1	Clay	(Czech Republic) Eva Birnerová	0–6, 4–6
Loss	0–5	Jul 2001	German Junior Open, Germany	Grade 1	Clay	(Germany) Anna-Lena Grönefeld	4–6, 3–6
Win	1–5	Sep 2001	Kentucky Junior International, United States	Grade 1	Hard	(Lithuania) Aurelija Misevičiūtė	6–3, 7–5
Loss	1–6	Nov 2001	Luxembourg Indoor Championships	Grade 2	Carpet	(Russia) Vera Dushevina	4–6, 4–6
Loss	1–7	Dec 2001	Yucatán Cup, Mexico	Grade 1	Hard	(Russia) Vera Zvonareva	3–6, 7–5, 2–6
Win	2–7	Jan 2002	Australian Open, Australia	Grade A	Hard	(Russia) Maria Sharapova	6–0, 7–5
Loss	2–8	Mar 2002	Banana Bowl, Brazil	Grade A	Clay	(Switzerland) Myriam Casanova	3–6, 5–7
Win	3–8	May 2002	Trofeo Bonfiglio Campionati Junior, Italy	Grade A	Clay	(Switzerland) Myriam Casanova	6–1, 7–6^{(7–2)}
Loss	3–9	Jun 2002	Frankfurt Junior International, Germany	Grade 1	Clay	(Germany) Anna-Lena Grönefeld	1–6, 3–6
Loss	3–10	Sep 2002	US Open, United States	Grade A	Hard	(Russia) Maria Kirilenko	4–6, 4–6
Win	4–10	Jan 2003	Australian Open, Australia (2)	Grade A	Hard	(Ukraine) Viktoriya Kutuzova	0–6, 6–2, 6–2

== Career Grand Slam statistics ==
=== Grand Slam tournament seedings ===
Year	Australian Open	French Open	Wimbledon	US Open
2003	did not qualify	absent	qualifier	did not qualify
2004	qualifier	unseeded	unseeded	unseeded
2005	unseeded	unseeded	unseeded	unseeded
2006	did not qualify	did not qualify	did not qualify	did not qualify
2007	did not qualify	did not qualify	qualifier	did not qualify
2008	did not qualify	did not qualify	qualifier	unseeded
2009	unseeded	unseeded	unseeded	qualifier
2010	unseeded	unseeded	unseeded	unseeded
2011	unseeded	unseeded	unseeded	unseeded
2012	unseeded	unseeded	unseeded	unseeded
2013	absent	qualifier	qualifier	did not qualify
2014	unseeded	unseeded	unseeded	30th
2015	25th	22nd	27th	unseeded
2016	unseeded	30th	24th	18th
2017	16th	20th	22nd	23nd
2018	20th	26th	23rd	23nd
2019	32nd	unseeded	unseeded	31st
2020	32nd	32nd	not held	absent
2021	unseeded	absent	absent	absent

== Wins over top 10 players ==
- She has a 10–59 (14%) record against players who were, at the time the match was played, ranked in the top 10.

#	Player	Rank	Event	Surface	Rd	Score	BSR	
1	(China) Li Na	2	Wimbledon, UK	Grass	3R	7–6^{(7–5)}, 7–6^{(7–5)}	43	2014
2	(Denmark) Caroline Wozniacki	8	Sydney International, Australia	Hard	1R	6–4, 1–1 ret.	25	2015
3	(Canada) Eugenie Bouchard	6	Madrid Open, Spain	Clay	1R	0–6, 6–3, 6–3	22	2015
4	(Russia) Maria Sharapova	3	Wuhan Open, China	Hard	2R	6–7^{(1–7)}, 7–6^{(7–4)}, 1–2 ret.	41	2015
5	(Spain) Garbiñe Muguruza	3	Australian Open	Hard	3R	6–3, 6–2	48	2016
6	(Germany) Angelique Kerber	3	Madrid Open, Spain	Clay	1R	6–4, 6–2	33	2016
7	(United Kingdom) Johanna Konta	7	Pan Pacific Open, Japan	Hard	2R	7–5, 7–6^{(7–5)}	25	2017
8	(Spain) Garbiñe Muguruza	1	China Open	Hard	1R	6–1, 2–0 ret.	29	2017
9	(Spain) Garbiñe Muguruza	3	Birmingham Classic, UK	Grass	2R	6–2, 6–4	24	2018
10	(Netherlands) Kiki Bertens	4	Wimbledon, UK	Grass	3R	7–5, 6–1	54	2019
