= 2011 Challenge Bell =

- Date: September 10–17
- Edition: 19th
- Category: WTA International
- Draw: 32S (26Q) / 16D (0Q)
- Prize money: US$220,000
- Surface: Carpet – indoors
- Location: Quebec City, Canada
- Venue: PEPS de l'Université Laval

Champions

Singles
- (Czech Republic) Barbora Záhlavová-Strýcová

Doubles
- (United States) Raquel Kops-Jones / (United States) Abigail Spears
← 2010 ·	Tournoi de Québec	· 2012 →

The 2011 Challenge Bell was a tennis tournament played on indoor carpet courts. It was the 19th edition of the Challenge Bell, and was part of the WTA International tournaments of the 2011 WTA Tour. It took place at the PEPS de l'Université Laval in Quebec City, Canada, from September 10 through September 17, 2011.

== Finals ==
=== Singles ===
(Czech Republic) Barbora Záhlavová-Strýcová defeated (New Zealand) Marina Erakovic, 4–6, 6–1, 6–0

- It was Záhlavová-Strýcová's only singles title of the year and the 1st of her career.

=== Doubles ===
(United States) Raquel Kops-Jones / (United States) Abigail Spears defeated (United States) Jamie Hampton / (Georgia (country)) Anna Tatishvili, 6–1, 3–6, [10–6]

== Entrants ==
=== Seeds ===
Country	Player	Rank^{1}	Seed
SVK	Daniela Hantuchová	23	1
CZE	Lucie Šafářová	26	2
AUT	Tamira Paszek	37	3
CAN	Rebecca Marino	41	4
SWE	Sofia Arvidsson	67	5
CZE	Barbora Záhlavová-Strýcová	71	6
USA	Irina Falconi	79	7
GEO	Anna Tatishvili	85	8

- ^{1} Rankings are as of August 29, 2011

=== Other entrants ===
The following players received wildcards into the singles main draw:

- (Canada) Eugenie Bouchard
- (Canada) Marie-Ève Pelletier
- (Canada) Aleksandra Wozniak

The following players received entry from the qualifying draw:

- (Russia) Elena Bovina
- (United States) Gail Brodsky
- (France) Julie Coin
- (United States) Ashley Weinhold
