= 2012 Challenge Bell – Doubles =

Doubles
- 2012 Challenge Bell

Final
- Champions: (Germany) Tatjana Malek (France) Kristina Mladenovic
- Runners-up: (Poland) Alicja Rosolska (United Kingdom) Heather Watson
- Score: 7–6^{(7–5)}, 6–7^{(6–8)}, [10–7]

Details
- Draw: 16
- Seeds: 4

Events
Singles	Doubles
← 2011 ·	Tournoi de Québec	· 2013 →

Raquel Kops-Jones and Abigail Spears were the defending champions, but decided not to participate this year.

Tatjana Malek and Kristina Mladenovic won the title, defeating Alicja Rosolska and Heather Watson 7–6^{(7–5)}, 6–7^{(6–8)}, [10–7] in the final.

== Seeds ==
1. (Poland) Alicja Rosolska / (United Kingdom) Heather Watson (final)
2. (Latvia) Līga Dekmeijere / (Croatia) Petra Martić (first round)
3. (Germany) Tatjana Malek / (France) Kristina Mladenovic (champions)
4. (United States) Lindsay Lee-Waters / (United States) Megan Moulton-Levy (first round)

== Draw ==
=== Key ===
- Q = Qualifier
- WC = Wild card
- LL = Lucky loser
- Alt = Alternate
- SE = Special exempt
- PR = Protected ranking
- ITF = ITF entry
- JE = Junior exempt
- w/o = Walkover
- r = Retired
- d = Defaulted
- SR = Special ranking

First round
1	(Poland) A Rosolska (United Kingdom) H Watson	6	6
WC	(Canada) S Dubois (Canada) H El Tabakh	2	2
(Croatia) M Abramović (Switzerland) A Sadiković	2	6	[8]
(Canada) E Bouchard (United States) I Falconi	6	3	[10]
4	(United States) L Lee-Waters (United States) M Moulton-Levy	5	6	[4]
(United States) J Pegula (United States) M Sanchez	7	4	[10]
(Russia) E Bovina (Slovakia) L Wienerová	4	3
(France) J Coin (Canada) M-È Pelletier	6	6
(United States) L Litvak (United States) A Weinhold	0	6^{2}
(United States) A Mueller (United States) A Muhammed	6	7^{7}
(United States) A Glatch (Georgia (country)) A Tatishvili	6	3	[8]
3	(Germany) T Malek (France) K Mladenovic	4	6	[10]
(United States) J Elie (Kazakhstan) S Karatantcheva	2	5
WC	(United States) G Min (Canada) C Zhao	6	7
(Canada) G Dabrowski (United States) A Riske	2	6	[10]
2	(Latvia) L Dekmeijere (Croatia) P Martić	6	3	[4]

Quarterfinals
1	(Poland) A Rosolska (United Kingdom) H Watson	7^{7}	6
(Canada) E Bouchard (United States) I Falconi	6^{4}	3
(United States) J Pegula (United States) M Sanchez	1	6	[5]
(France) J Coin (Canada) M-È Pelletier	6	1	[10]
(United States) A Mueller (United States) A Muhammed	2	1
3	(Germany) T Malek (France) K Mladenovic	6	6
WC	(United States) G Min (Canada) C Zhao	3	4
(Canada) G Dabrowski (United States) A Riske	6	6

Semifinals
1	(Poland) A Rosolska (United Kingdom) H Watson	6	6
(France) J Coin (Canada) M-È Pelletier	4	2
3	(Germany) T Malek (France) K Mladenovic	6	6
(Canada) G Dabrowski (United States) A Riske	3	1

Final
1	(Poland) A Rosolska (United Kingdom) H Watson	6^{5}	7^{8}	[7]
3	(Germany) T Malek (France) K Mladenovic	7^{7}	6^{6}	[10]
