= 2011 Challenge Bell – Doubles =

Doubles
- 2011 Challenge Bell

Final
- Champions: (United States) Raquel Kops-Jones (United States) Abigail Spears
- Runners-up: (United States) Jamie Hampton (Georgia (country)) Anna Tatishvili
- Score: 6–1, 3–6, [10–6]

Details
- Draw: 16
- Seeds: 4

Events
Singles	Doubles
← 2010 ·	Tournoi de Québec	· 2012 →

Sofia Arvidsson and Johanna Larsson were the defending champions, but Larsson decided not to participate this year. Arvidsson partnered with Marina Erakovic, but lost in the first round to Jamie Hampton and Anna Tatishvili.

Raquel Kops-Jones and Abigail Spears won the title, defeating Hampton and Tatishvili 6–1, 3–6, [10–6] in the final.

== Seeds ==
1. (United States) Raquel Kops-Jones / (United States) Abigail Spears (champions)
2. (Sweden) Sofia Arvidsson / (New Zealand) Marina Erakovic (first round)
3. (Netherlands) Michaëlla Krajicek / (Czech Republic) Lucie Šafářová (quarterfinals)
4. (United States) Lindsay Lee-Waters / (United States) Megan Moulton-Levy (semifinals)

== Draw ==
=== Key ===
- Q = Qualifier
- WC = Wild card
- LL = Lucky loser
- Alt = Alternate
- ITF = ITF entry
- PR = Protected ranking
- SR = Special ranking
- SE = Special exempt
- JE = Junior exempt
- JR = Junior Accelerator Programme entrant
- CO = College Accelerator Programme entrant
- NG = Next Gen Accelerator Program entrant
- w/o = Walkover
- r = Retired
- d = Defaulted

First round
1	(United States) R Kops-Jones (United States) A Spears	6	6
(United States) L Albanese (United States) M Brengle	3	0
(Hungary) M Czink (Czech Republic) A Hlaváčková	6	7
(Russia) E Bovina (France) I Pavlovic	4	5
3	(Netherlands) M Krajicek (Czech Republic) L Šafářová	7	5	[10]
(Croatia) M Lučić (United States) M Oudin	5	7	[7]
(United States) A Fink (United States) A Weinhold	4	2
(United Kingdom) H Watson (Germany) K Wörle	6	6
(France) J Coin (Canada) M-È Pelletier	0	6	[10]
(Latvia) L Dekmeijere (United States) A Mueller	6	3	[12]
(Luxembourg) A Kremer (United States) V Lepchenko	4	2
4	(United States) L Lee-Waters (United States) M Moulton-Levy	6	6
WC	(Canada) E Bouchard (Canada) R Marino	3	3
(Slovenia) P Rampre (United States) C Scholl	6	6
(United States) J Hampton (Georgia (country)) A Tatishvili	4	7^{7}	[10]
2	(Sweden) S Arvidsson (New Zealand) M Erakovic	6	6^{5}	[8]

Quarterfinals
1	(United States) R Kops-Jones (United States) A Spears	2	7^{7}	[10]
(Hungary) M Czink (Czech Republic) A Hlaváčková	6	6^{4}	[6]
3	(Netherlands) M Krajicek (Czech Republic) L Šafářová	3	6^{3}
(United Kingdom) H Watson (Germany) K Wörle	6	7^{7}
(Latvia) L Dekmeijere (United States) A Mueller	2	3
4	(United States) L Lee-Waters (United States) M Moulton-Levy	6	6
(Slovenia) P Rampre (United States) C Scholl	2	7	[7]
(United States) J Hampton (Georgia (country)) A Tatishvili	6	5	[10]

Semifinals
1	(United States) R Kops-Jones (United States) A Spears	4	6	[13]
(United Kingdom) H Watson (Germany) K Wörle	6	3	[11]
4	(United States) L Lee-Waters (United States) M Moulton-Levy	5	6	[5]
(United States) J Hampton (Georgia (country)) A Tatishvili	7	1	[10]

Final
1	(United States) R Kops-Jones (United States) A Spears	6	3	[10]
(United States) J Hampton (Georgia (country)) A Tatishvili	1	6	[6]
