= 2013 Challenge Bell =

- Date: September 9–15
- Edition: 21st
- Category: WTA International
- Draw: 32S (32Q) / 16D (0Q)
- Prize money: US$235,000
- Surface: Carpet – indoors
- Location: Quebec City, Canada
- Venue: PEPS de l'Université Laval

Champions

Singles
- (Czech Republic) Lucie Šafářová

Doubles
- (Russia) Alla Kudryavtseva / (Australia) Anastasia Rodionova
| ← 2012 · | Tournoi de Québec | · 2014 → |

The 2013 Challenge Bell was a tennis tournament played on indoor carpet courts. It was the 21st edition of the Challenge Bell, and was part of the WTA International tournaments of the 2013 WTA Tour. It took place at the PEPS de l'Université Laval in Quebec City, Canada, from September 9 through September 15, 2013.

== Finals ==
=== Singles ===
(Czech Republic) Lucie Šafářová defeated (New Zealand) Marina Erakovic, 6–4, 6–3

=== Doubles ===
(Russia) Alla Kudryavtseva / (Australia) Anastasia Rodionova defeated (Czech Republic) Andrea Hlaváčková / (Czech Republic) Lucie Hradecká, 6–4, 6–3

== Points and prize money ==
=== Point distribution ===
| Event | W | F | SF | QF | Round of 16 | Round of 32 | Q | Q3 | Q2 | Q1 |
| Singles | 280 | 200 | 130 | 70 | 30 | 1 | 16 | 10 | 6 | 1 |
| Doubles | 280 | 200 | 130 | 70 | 1 | — | — | — | — | — |

=== Prize money ===
| Event | W | F | SF | QF | Round of 16 | Round of 32^{*} | Q3 | Q2 | Q1 |
| Singles | $40,000 | $20,000 | $10,425 | $5,500 | $3,100 | $1,800 | $950 | $700 | $500 |
| Doubles | $11,500 | $6,000 | $3,200 | $1,700 | $900 | — | — | — | — |
Doubles prize money per team

^* Qualifiers prize money is also the round of 32 prize money

== Singles main draw entrants ==
=== Seeds ===
| Country | Player | Rank^{1} | Seed |
|---|---|---|---|
| BEL | Kirsten Flipkens | 14 | 1 |
| FRA | Kristina Mladenovic | 36 | 2 |
| CZE | Lucie Šafářová | 41 | 3 |
| USA | Bethanie Mattek-Sands | 53 | 4 |
| CAN | Eugenie Bouchard | 59 | 5 |
| NZL | Marina Erakovic | 68 | 6 |
| USA | Lauren Davis | 70 | 7 |
| FRA | Caroline Garcia | 75 | 8 |

- ^{1} Rankings are as of August 26, 2013

=== Other entrants ===
The following players received wildcards into the singles main draw:

- (Canada) Stéphanie Dubois
- (Czech Republic) Lucie Šafářová
- (Canada) Aleksandra Wozniak

The following players received entry from the qualifying draw:

- (France) Julie Coin
- (Kazakhstan) Sesil Karatantcheva
- (United States) Melanie Oudin
- (Switzerland) Amra Sadiković

=== Retirements ===
- (Croatia) Petra Martić (gastrointestinal illness)
- (United States) Bethanie Mattek-Sands (right knee injury)

== Doubles main draw entrants ==
=== Seeds ===
| Country | Player | Country | Player | Rank^{1} | Seed |
|---|---|---|---|---|---|
| CZE | Andrea Hlaváčková | CZE | Lucie Hradecká | 19 | 1 |
| RUS | Alla Kudryavtseva | AUS | Anastasia Rodionova | 93 | 2 |
| CRO | Darija Jurak | CRO | Petra Martić | 111 | 3 |
| COL | Catalina Castaño | CRO | Mirjana Lučić-Baroni | 132 | 4 |

- ^{1} Rankings are as of August 26, 2013

=== Other entrants ===
The following pairs received wildcards into the doubles main draw:

- (Canada) Françoise Abanda / (Canada) Carol Zhao
- (Sweden) Sofia Arvidsson / (Canada) Stéphanie Dubois

The following pair received entry as alternates:

- (United States) Chieh-yu Hsu / (United States) Nicole Melichar

=== Withdrawals ===
Before the tournament

- (Canada) Eugenie Bouchard (right thigh injury)
