= 2011 Challenge Bell – Singles =

Singles
- 2011 Challenge Bell

Final
- Champion: (Czech Republic) Barbora Záhlavová-Strýcová
- Runner-up: (New Zealand) Marina Erakovic
- Score: 4–6, 6–1, 6–0

Details
- Draw: 32
- Seeds: 8

Events
Singles	Doubles
← 2010 ·	Tournoi de Québec	· 2012 →

Tamira Paszek was the defending champion, but lost in the semifinals to Marina Erakovic.

Barbora Záhlavová-Strýcová won her maiden WTA singles title, defeating Erakovic 4–6, 6–1, 6–0 in the final.

== Seeds ==
1. (Slovakia) Daniela Hantuchová (quarterfinals)
2. (Czech Republic) Lucie Šafářová (second round)
3. (Austria) Tamira Paszek (semifinals)
4. (Canada) Rebecca Marino (quarterfinals)
5. (Sweden) Sofia Arvidsson (second round)
6. (Czech Republic) Barbora Záhlavová-Strýcová (champion)
7. (United States) Irina Falconi (second round)
8. (Georgia (country)) Anna Tatishvili (first round)

== Draw ==
=== Key ===
- Q = Qualifier
- WC = Wild card
- LL = Lucky loser
- Alt = Alternate
- ITF = ITF entry
- PR = Protected ranking
- SR = Special ranking
- SE = Special exempt
- JE = Junior exempt
- JR = Junior Accelerator Programme entrant
- CO = College Accelerator Programme entrant
- NG = Next Gen Accelerator Program entrant
- w/o = Walkover
- r = Retired
- d = Defaulted

=== Finals ===
Semifinals
(New Zealand) Marina Erakovic	2	7	6
3	(Austria) Tamira Paszek	6	5	4
(Netherlands) Michaëlla Krajicek	4	3
6	(Czech Republic) Barbora Záhlavová-Strýcová	6	6

Final
(New Zealand) Marina Erakovic	6	1	0
6	(Czech Republic) Barbora Záhlavová-Strýcová	4	6	6

=== Top half ===
First round
1	(Slovakia) D Hantuchová	6	2	6
(Croatia) A Tomljanović	0	6	4
(Germany) K Wörle	4	6	3
(Hungary) M Czink	6	1	6
(New Zealand) M Erakovic	6	4	6
(France) C Garcia	4	6	4
(United States) A Riske	3	3
7	(United States) I Falconi	6	6
3	(Austria) T Paszek	6	4	6
Q	(United States) A Weinhold	0	6	2
(United States) V Lepchenko	6	6^{0}	6
WC	(Canada) E Bouchard	1	7^{7}	3
(United Kingdom) H Watson	6	6
(Luxembourg) A Kremer	2	4
Q	(Russia) E Bovina	6	1	2
5	(Sweden) S Arvidsson	2	6	6

Second round
1	(Slovakia) D Hantuchová	6^{4}	6	6
(Hungary) M Czink	7^{7}	4	3
(New Zealand) M Erakovic	6	2	6
7	(United States) I Falconi	3	6	2
3	(Austria) T Paszek	6^{2}	6	7^{7}
(United States) V Lepchenko	7^{7}	3	6^{4}
(United Kingdom) H Watson	7	6
5	(Sweden) S Arvidsson	5	3

Quarterfinals
1	(Slovakia) D Hantuchová	4	4
(New Zealand) M Erakovic	6	6
3	(Austria) T Paszek	6	7^{7}
(United Kingdom) H Watson	4	6^{5}

Semifinals
(New Zealand) M Erakovic	2	7	6
3	(Austria) T Paszek	6	5	4

=== Bottom half ===
First round
8	(Georgia (country)) A Tatishvili	7	4	4
Q	(France) J Coin	5	6	6
(Netherlands) M Krajicek	7^{7}	6
WC	(Canada) M-È Pelletier	6^{1}	3
Q	(United States) G Brodsky	2	1
WC	(Canada) A Wozniak	6	6
(Canada) S Dubois	2	4
4	(Canada) R Marino	6	6
6	(Czech Republic) B Záhlavová-Strýcová	6	6
(China) S Zhang	4	2
(United States) J Hampton	4	2
(Croatia) M Lučić	6	6
(United States) M Oudin	1	3
(Czech Republic) A Hlaváčková	6	6
(United States) J Craybas	2	1
2	(Czech Republic) L Šafářová	6	6

Second round
Q	(France) J Coin	5	6	1
(Netherlands) M Krajicek	7	4	6
WC	(Canada) A Wozniak	4	6	4
4	(Canada) R Marino	6	4	6
6	(Czech Republic) B Záhlavová-Strýcová	2	6	6
(Croatia) M Lučić	6	1	3
(Czech Republic) A Hlaváčková	7^{7}	7
2	(Czech Republic) L Šafářová	6^{1}	5

Quarterfinals
(Netherlands) M Krajicek	6	6
4	(Canada) R Marino	1	3
6	(Czech Republic) B Záhlavová-Strýcová	6	7
(Czech Republic) A Hlaváčková	3	5

Semifinals
(Netherlands) M Krajicek	4	3
6	(Czech Republic) B Záhlavová-Strýcová	6	6

== Qualifying ==
=== Seeds ===
1. (Portugal) Michelle Larcher de Brito (qualifying competition)
2. (United States) Madison Brengle (second round)
3. (United States) Chichi Scholl (qualifying competition)
4. (United States) Ashley Weinhold (qualified)
5. (Slovenia) Petra Rampre (qualifying competition)
6. (France) Irena Pavlovic (second round)
7. (United States) Gail Brodsky (qualified)
8. (United States) Lauren Albanese (second round)

=== Qualifiers ===
1. (United States) Gail Brodsky
2. (France) Julie Coin
3. (Russia) Elena Bovina
4. (United States) Ashley Weinhold

=== Qualifying draw ===
==== First qualifier ====
First round
(United States) Amanda Fink	1	2
(Switzerland) Amra Sadiković	6	6
(Canada) Gabriela Dabrowski	3	2
(United States) Lindsay Lee-Waters	6	6
WC	(Canada) Tanya Alaby	1	3
7	(United States) Gail Brodsky	6	6

Second round
1	(Portugal) Michelle Larcher de Brito	6	6
(Switzerland) Amra Sadiković	0	4
(United States) Lindsay Lee-Waters	6^{7}	7^{7}	4
7	(United States) Gail Brodsky	7^{9}	6^{5}	6

Qualifying competition
1	(Portugal) Michelle Larcher de Brito	3	4
7	(United States) Gail Brodsky	6	6

==== Second qualifier ====
First round				Second round				Qualifying competition
				2	(United States) Madison Brengle	0	2
(United States) Beatrice Capra	6	3	2		(France) Julie Coin	6	6
(France) Julie Coin	4	6	6						(France) Julie Coin	6	6
(Latvia) Līga Dekmeijere	6	6						5	(Slovenia) Petra Rampre	3	2
(United Kingdom) Jennifer Allan	1	4			(Latvia) Līga Dekmeijere	1	3
				5	(Slovenia) Petra Rampre	6	6

==== Third qualifier ====
First round				Second round				Qualifying competition
				3	(United States) Chichi Scholl	6	7^{7}
WC	(Canada) Priscila Nuñez	0	2	WC	(United States) Raquel Kops-Jones	4	6^{4}
WC	(United States) Raquel Kops-Jones	6	6					3	(United States) Chichi Scholl	3	5
(Russia) Elena Bovina		6	6						(Russia) Elena Bovina	6	7
(United States) Alexandra Stevenson		2	2		(Russia) Elena Bovina	7^{7}	6
				6	(France) Irina Pavlovic	6^{4}	3

==== Fourth qualifier ====
First round
(Venezuela) Gabriela Paz	7^{7}	6
WC	(Canada) Carol Zhao	6^{5}	1
WC	(United States) Abigail Spears	7	6
(United States) Alexandra Mueller	5	3
(Greece) Stamatia Fafaliou	0	1
8	(United States) Lauren Albanese	6	6

Second round
4	(United States) Ashley Weinhold	7	5
(Venezuela) Gabriela Paz	5	0^{r}
WC	(United States) Abigail Spears	6	6
8	(United States) Lauren Albanese	3	4

Qualifying competition
4	(United States) Ashley Weinhold	6	6
WC	(United States) Abigail Spears	2	3
