= 2013 Challenge Bell – Doubles =

Doubles
- 2013 Challenge Bell

Final
- Champions: (Russia) Alla Kudryavtseva (Australia) Anastasia Rodionova
- Runners-up: (Czech Republic) Andrea Hlaváčková (Czech Republic) Lucie Hradecká
- Score: 6–4, 6–3

Details
- Draw: 16
- Seeds: 4

Events
Singles	Doubles
- Tournoi de Québec

Tatjana (Malek) Maria and Kristina Mladenovic were the defending champions, but decided not to participate this year.

Alla Kudryavtseva and Anastasia Rodionova won the title, defeating Andrea Hlaváčková and Lucie Hradecká 6–4, 6–3 in the final.

== Seeds ==
1. (Czech Republic) Andrea Hlaváčková / (Czech Republic) Lucie Hradecká (final)
2. (Russia) Alla Kudryavtseva / (Australia) Anastasia Rodionova (champions)
3. (Croatia) Darija Jurak / (Croatia) Petra Martić (first round)
4. (Colombia) Catalina Castaño / (Croatia) Mirjana Lučić-Baroni (first round)

== Draw ==
Key

- Q = Qualifier
- WC = Wild card
- LL = Lucky loser
- Alt = Alternate
- ITF = ITF entry
- PR = Protected ranking
- SR = Special ranking
- SE = Special exempt
- JE = Junior exempt
- JR = Junior Accelerator Programme entrant
- CO = College Accelerator Programme entrant
- NG = Next Gen Accelerator Program entrant
- w/o = Walkover
- r = Retired
- d = Defaulted

First round
1	(Czech Republic) A Hlaváčková (Czech Republic) L Hradecká	7	6
WC	(Sweden) S Arvidsson (Canada) S Dubois	5	2
(Austria) T Paszek (Croatia) A Tomljanović	2	7	[14]
(Poland) A Rosolska (United States) C Vandeweghe	6	5	[12]
4	(Colombia) C Castaño (Croatia) M Lučić-Baroni	6^{1}	4
(United States) I Falconi (Georgia (country)) A Tatishvili	7^{7}	6
(United States) A Muhammad (United States) A Will	3	6	[11]
Alt	(United States) C-y Hsu (United States) N Melichar	6	2	[9]
(Canada) G Dabrowski (Canada) S Fichman	2	4
(Germany) K Barrois (Greece) E Daniilidou	6	6
(United States) M Sanchez (United Kingdom) N Slater	5	7	[10]
3	(Croatia) D Jurak (Croatia) P Martić	7	5	[7]
(Latvia) L Dekmeijere (United States) N Pluskota	3	6	[5]
WC	(Canada) F Abanda (Canada) C Zhao	6	2	[10]
(France) J Coin (Switzerland) A Sadiković	4	6	[7]
2	(Russia) A Kudryavtseva (Australia) A Rodionova	6	2	[10]

Quarterfinals
1	(Czech Republic) A Hlaváčková (Czech Republic) L Hradecká	7	6
(Austria) T Paszek (Croatia) A Tomljanović	5	4
(United States) I Falconi (Georgia (country)) A Tatishvili	6	6
(United States) A Muhammad (United States) A Will	1	1
(Germany) K Barrois (Greece) E Daniilidou	6	7
(United States) M Sanchez (United Kingdom) N Slater	4	5
WC	(Canada) F Abanda (Canada) C Zhao	6^{4}	5
2	(Russia) A Kudryavtseva (Australia) A Rodionova	7^{7}	7

Semifinals
1	(Czech Republic) A Hlaváčková (Czech Republic) L Hradecká	3	6	[10]
(United States) I Falconi (Georgia (country)) A Tatishvili	6	4	[7]
(Germany) K Barrois (Greece) E Daniilidou	3	6^{4}
2	(Russia) A Kudryavtseva (Australia) A Rodionova	6	7^{7}

Final
1	(Czech Republic) A Hlaváčková (Czech Republic) L Hradecká	4	3
2	(Russia) A Kudryavtseva (Australia) A Rodionova	6	6
