= Barbora Strýcová =

Czech tennis player (born 1986)

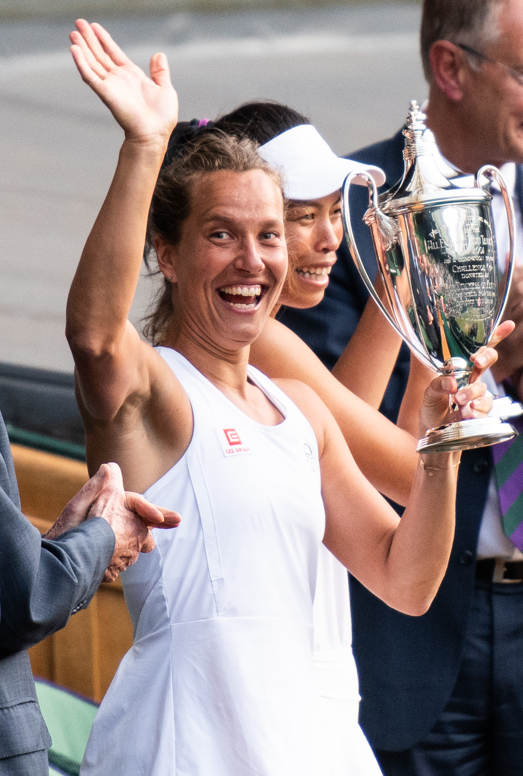
- Strýcová at the 2019 Wimbledon Championships
- Country (sports): Czech Republic
- Residence: Dubai, United Arab Emirates
- Born: 28 March 1986 (age 40) Plzeň, Czechoslovakia (now Czech Republic)
- Height: 1.64 m (5 ft 5 in)
- Turned pro: 2002
- Retired: 2023
- Plays: Right-handed (two-handed backhand)
- Coach: David Kotyza (2018–19)
- Prize money: US$ 12,747,182

Singles
- Career record: 567–418
- Career titles: 2
- Highest ranking: No. 16 (16 January 2017)

Grand Slam singles results
- Australian Open: 4R (2016, 2017, 2018)
- French Open: 4R (2018)
- Wimbledon: SF (2019)
- US Open: 3R (2014, 2015, 2018)

Other tournaments
- Olympic Games: 2R (2016)

Doubles
- Career record: 517–267
- Career titles: 32
- Highest ranking: No. 1 (15 July 2019)

Grand Slam doubles results
- Australian Open: F (2020)
- French Open: SF (2018)
- Wimbledon: W (2019, 2023)
- US Open: SF (2014, 2017)

Other doubles tournaments
- Tour Finals: F (2019)
- Olympic Games: Bronze (2016)

Grand Slam mixed doubles results
- Australian Open: QF (2010)
- French Open: 2R (2010, 2011)
- Wimbledon: QF (2004)
- US Open: QF (2011, 2023)

Team competitions
- Fed Cup: W (2011, 2012, 2014, 2015, 2016, 2018), record 22–11
Medal record
Representing Czech Republic
Olympic Games
Bronze medal – third place	2016 Rio de Janeiro	Doubles

Barbora Strýcová (Czech pronunciation: [ˈbarbora ˈstriːtsovaː]; born 28 March 1986), formerly known as Barbora Záhlavová-Strýcová, is a Czech former professional tennis player who was ranked world No. 1 in doubles.

She won two Grand Slam titles in doubles at the 2019 Wimbledon Championships and 2023 Wimbledon Championships, both times partnered with Hsieh Su-wei. The pair also finished runners-up at the 2020 Australian Open and 2019 WTA Finals. Strýcová won 32 doubles titles on the WTA Tour, including eight at WTA 1000 level, and became world No. 1 for the first time in July 2019, holding the top ranking for a total of 27 weeks.

She is also a successful singles player, with her best major result coming at the 2019 Wimbledon Championships, where she reached the semifinals, having previously been a quarterfinalist in 2014. Strýcová won two WTA singles titles, at the 2011 Tournoi de Québec and the 2017 Linz Open, finishing runner-up on six further occasions. She achieved her career-high ranking of world No. 16 in January 2017.

Strýcová represented the Czech Republic in the Fed Cup from 2002 to 2018, and was a key part of the team which dominated the competition for almost a decade, winning six titles between 2011 and 2018. She also competed at the Olympic Games on two occasions, winning the bronze medal in doubles at Rio 2016 with Lucie Šafářová.

Strýcová announced her retirement on 4 May 2021. However, on 22 March 2023, she announced her return to the professional circuit. Her last professional match was in September 2023 at the US Open in mixed doubles partnering Santiago González.

== Career ==
=== Early years ===
Strýcová was a strong junior player, winning two majors in girls' singles, the 2002 Australian Open, and then defending that title the following year. She also won three Grand Slam girls' doubles titles between 2001 and 2003.

She reached world No. 1 in both singles and doubles on the junior rankings, achieving both in 2002, and was named the ITF Junior World Champion that same year. In her junior career, she beat several players who went on to become notable professionals such as Maria Sharapova, Anna-Lena Grönefeld and Maria Kirilenko.

Turning professional in 2003, Strýcová had already worked her ranking into the top 300 with some good results in ITF Women's Circuit events over 2002. She continued to play mostly ITF events throughout the year, and made her Grand Slam debut at Wimbledon, qualifying and losing in the first round to Tatiana Perebiynis. She finished the year ranked world No. 161.

2004 turned out to be the year that Strýcová stepped up considerably. She began the year by qualifying for the Australian Open and then reached the fourth round at the WTA tournament in Indian Wells, beating seeded player Eleni Daniilidou before losing to Justine Henin, a result that broke her into the top 100 for the first time. She recorded another notable win over Anna Smashnova in Amelia Island, and won her first two Grand Slam main-draw matches at the Australian Open and French Open. After hitting a rough patch in the middle part of the season, she finished the year strongly by reaching her first WTA Tour semifinal in Guangzhou and winning an ITF event in Saint-Raphaël, France. She finished the season ranked world No. 56.

Strýcová's progress took a step backward in 2005, dropping out of the top 100 in the world after failing to back up her breakthrough season and winning just 17 matches throughout the season. Despite this, she achieved some notable results in doubles, reaching four WTA Tour doubles finals and winning the title on two of those occasions. 2006 also begun poorly for her in singles, as she struggled to string together wins and subsequently dropped out of the top 200 of the world rankings in April 2006 before recovering slightly after some good results in ITF events. She married her coach between the 2006 and 2007 seasons. In 2007, Záhlavová-Strýcová played mostly on the ITF Circuit once more and achieved some good results, reaching several semifinals throughout the season, but still sat outside the top 100.

After a few years seemingly in limbo, Záhlavová-Strýcová's plugging away at ITF events finally managed to bring with it some results by 2008, winning titles in Fort Walton Beach, Redding (both American events) and Szczecin, Poland, and reaching the second round in WTA events in Amelia Island and Charleston. She qualified for Wimbledon and made the third round of a Grand Slam for the first time in her career thus returning to the top 100, where she remained until the end of the season, her second top-100 year-end finish.

=== 2009 ===
Záhlavová-Strýcová failed to make any progress in her first five tournaments of the season, including at the Australian Open where she lost to Stéphanie Cohen-Aloro, but she enjoyed some success in two WTA tournaments in Mexico, reaching the semifinals in Acapulco and the quarterfinals in Monterrey, beating top-20 player Flavia Pennetta at the latter event.

Following that, she returned to struggling ways, losing her opening match in all but three tournaments up to July. She fell out of the top 100 after Wimbledon, where she was defending third-round points, by losing in the first round to Ekaterina Makarova.

Záhlavová-Strýcová's results improved during the latter part of the year, starting with a quarterfinal appearance at the WTA Tour event in Bad Gastein, as well as reaching the doubles final in Prague. She then played a $25k in Trnava, Slovakia, where she reached the semifinals, before qualifying and winning her first-round match at the US Open, losing to Victoria Azarenka in the second round. She built on these performances in ITF Circuit events at the end of the season, winning the $100k+H event in Ortisei, Italy, and a $50k+H event in Ismaning, Germany, and worked her way back into the top 100 for the end of the season. In doubles, she won two straight events at the WTA tournaments in Quebec City and Luxembourg, her fourth and fifth WTA doubles titles.

=== 2010–2011 ===
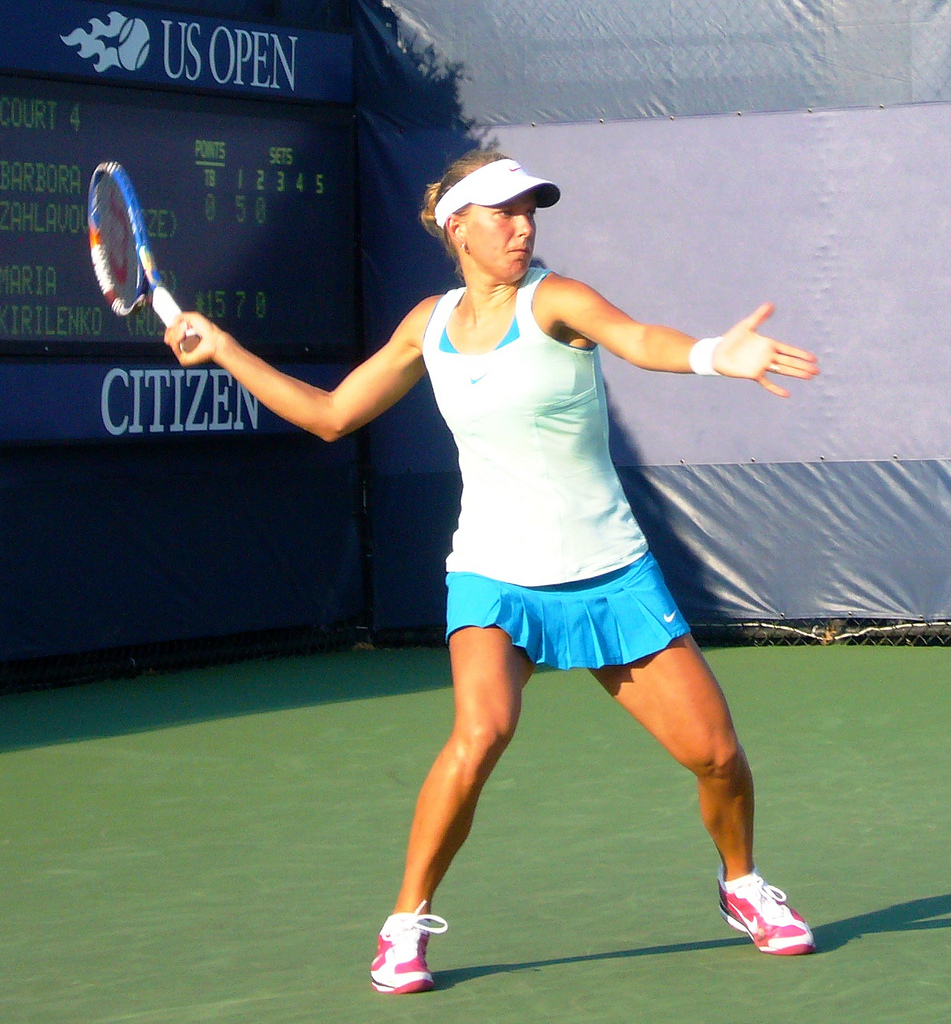
Záhlavová-Strýcová at the 2010 US Open

At the Australian Open, Záhlavová-Strýcová won her first round against Regina Kulikova in a match that lasted 4 hours and 19 minutes – breaking the record for longest match in women's Grand Slam history (which itself was broken a year later by Francesca Schiavone and Svetlana Kuznetsova). She lost in the second round to Dinara Safina. In February and March, she won three doubles titles in Paris, Acapulco and Monterrey, her sixth, seventh and eighth tournament wins in the doubles discipline.

At the French Open, Záhlavová-Strýcová lost in first round to Rossana de los Ríos, before reaching the third round of a Grand Slam for the second time at Wimbledon, where she beat Elena Vesnina and Daniela Hantuchová and lost to Maria Sharapova. Her Wimbledon performance boosted her confidence and thus at the Prague Open she managed to make the first singles final of her career, dismantling Patty Schnyder with the loss of only two games in the semifinals. In the final, she lost to Ágnes Szávay. As a result of her recent form, she rose into the top 50 for the first time in singles following Prague.

Záhlavová-Strýcová continued to enjoy success in doubles for the rest of the season. With her regular partner Iveta Benešová, she won the biggest title of her career at the Premier 5 tournament in Tokyo, and then partnered Renata Voráčová to win Linz, helping her to finish the season in the top 20 of the doubles ranking. In singles competition, she struggled to build on her strong summer results, failing to advance in six of the ten tournaments she played following Prague, among them a first round loss at the US Open to Maria Kirilenko, thus dropping to world No. 69 by the end of the year.

Záhlavová-Strýcová defeated Marina Erakovic in the final of the 2011 Bell Challenge to claim her first WTA singles title.

=== 2013 ===
In February, Záhlavová-Strýcová was banned for six months, backdated to 16 October 2012 until 15 April 2013, after testing positive for the stimulant sibutramine, which Strýcová explained had got into her system accidentally through her ingestion of the supplement ACAI Berry Thin. ITF accepted her explanation and determined she bore "no significant fault or negligence". Her results were disqualified during the period of the ban and ordered the return of all prizes won during that period. Záhlavová-Strýcová made her return at the Porsche Grand Prix in Stuttgart. She lost in the first round of qualifying to Mirjana Lučić-Baroni. In doubles, she and partner Julia Görges lost their first-round match to Liezel Huber and Janette Husárová. In May, she won the Empire Slovak Open, a $75k event, it was her first tournament win since coming back from her ban.

=== 2014 ===
At the Wimbledon Championships, she defeated reigning Australian Open champion Li Na in the third round, in soon-to-be last professional match for world No. 2. Also, she beat Caroline Wozniacki in the fourth round, in straight sets, after a struggle at the end of the second, during which Wozniacki defended four match points. Advancing to a Grand Slam singles quarterfinal for the first time, she lost in straight sets to eventual champion, compatriot Petra Kvitová.

=== 2015 ===
Záhlavová-Strýcová started the year strongly, with a semifinal finish at the Auckland Open and a quarterfinal showing at the Sydney International, losing to Caroline Wozniacki and Tsvetana Pironkova, respectively.

Seeded 25th in the women's singles draw of the Australian Open, she lost in the third round to former two-time champion Victoria Azarenka. Unseeded in the singles draw of the Diamond Games Antwerp, she lost in the semifinal to eventual winner Andrea Petkovic. Unseeded in the singles draw at Dubai, she lost in the second round to eventual runner-up, Karolína Plíšková. She also lost her second-round match in Doha to former No. 1, Venus Williams, after failing to convert a match point.

On 2 March 2015, she achieved a career-high ranking of world No. 20. It was the first time in the Open Era that the world's top 20 featured four Czech women (also with Petra Kvitová at No. 4, Lucie Šafářová at No. 11, and Karolína Plíšková at No. 15).

=== 2016 ===
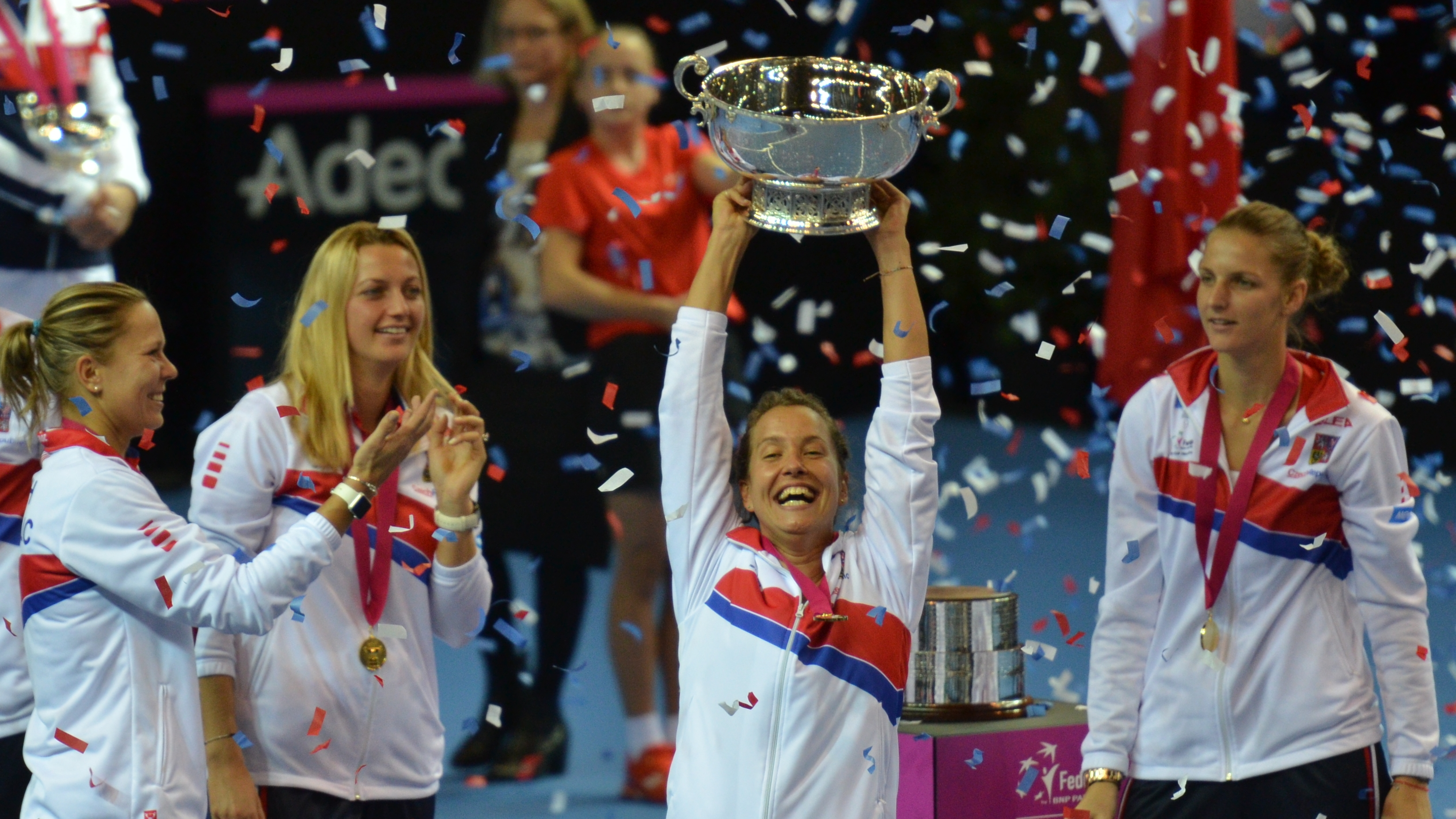
Strýcová celebrating the Czech Fed Cup triumph

After a couple of early losses at Auckland and Brisbane, Strýcová got as far as the last 16 of the Australian Open, where she was beaten by Victoria Azarenka, and in February to the final at Dubai, where she came runner-up to Sara Errani. This latter success took her back to within the top 40. In her next tournament, the Qatar Open, she defeated Kristina Mladenovic in the first round, and then lost to compatriot Petra Kvitová in straight sets.

At the Indian Wells Open, Strýcová won her first round match against Aliaksandra Sasnovich in straight sets and came back from 5–7, 1–3 down to defeat 22nd seed Andrea Petkovic, 5–7, 6–4, 7–5. She then came from a set down to defeat Kurumi Nara, who had just upset Venus Williams. In the fourth round, she had to retire from the match against fifth seed Simona Halep in the second set due to a respiratory infection. At Miami Open, she won her first round match easily against Anna-Lena Friedsam. In the second round, she lost to Angelique Kerber in straight sets. In the Fed Cup semifinal against Switzerland, she got an easy win over Timea Bacsinszky, 6–0, 6–2. Lost her next match to Fed Cup hero Viktorija Golubic in three sets.

Her first clay-court tournament was the home tournament Prague Open. Strýcová reached the quarterfinals, falling to Samantha Stosur in a tight three set match. She played Madrid next, where she upset then No. 3, Angelique Kerber in straight sets, then lost to Madison Keys in the second round. In her next tournament at Rome, she reached the quarterfinals with wins over Karin Knapp, Heather Watson, and Eugenie Bouchard. In the quarterfinals, she faced Madison Keys, and lost in a tight three-setter, having been up two breaks in the first set. Yet, this was her best result in Rome. Having not won a main draw match in a decade at the French Open, she reached the third round with wins over compatriot Lucie Hradecká and Polona Hercog. In the third round she faced then No. 2, Agnieszka Radwańska, and lost in three sets.

She started her grass-court season in Birmingham, where she reached the final, facing both her opponents and never-ending rain delays. On her way to the final, she got wins against compatriot, 8th seed Karolína Plíšková, Heather Watson, Tsvetana Pironkova, and CoCo Vandeweghe. She faced Madison Keys in the final, and suffered her third loss to her in less than two months, 3–6, 4–6. She was the 24th seed in Wimbledon, where she reached the third round beating Anett Kontaveit and wildcard Evgeniya Rodina. There she lost to Ekaterina Makarova who had just beaten double champion Petra Kvitová, 4–6, 2–6.

At the Summer Olympics in Rio, she won her first Olympic medal, a bronze in the women's doubles playoff on 13 August with her partner Lucie Šafářová.

At Cincinnati Open, she came away with the women's doubles title with her new partner Sania Mirza while defeating Martina Hingis and CoCo Vandeweghe in the finals. It was after this tournament that she reached a new career high ranking of No. 19 in singles.

=== 2017 ===
In October, she won the Linz Open, beating Magdaléna Rybáriková in the final. This was her second WTA Tour title.

=== 2018 ===
In the third round of the Australian Open, she defeated Bernarda Pera in straight sets before losing against Karolína Plíšková in a three-setter. At Indian Wells, she lost in the second round to Petra Martić in singles. But in doubles, she won the final with Hsieh Su-wei against Ekaterina Makarova and Elena Vesnina.

Strýcová reached the doubles final of Rome, Tokyo, and Wuhan. She won New Haven and Beijing, partnering Andrea Sestini Hlaváčková.

In singles, she lost the semifinal in Birmingham and the quarterfinal in Tokyo.

=== 2019: Wimbledon doubles title and doubles No. 1 ===
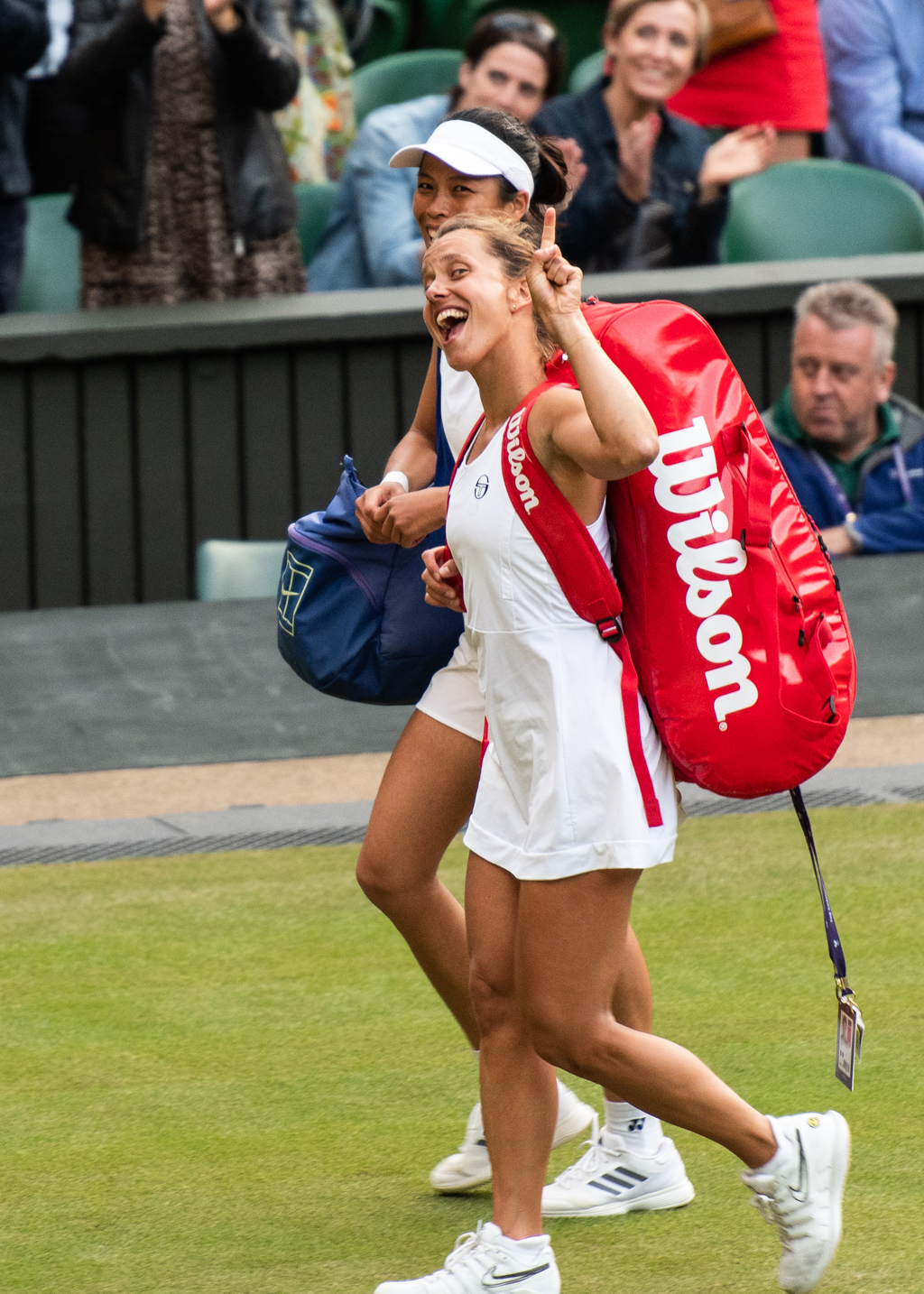
Hsieh Su-wei and Strýcová after winning the Wimbledon doubles

In January, Strýcová and her doubles partner Markéta Vondroušová reached the semifinals of the Australian Open, but were defeated by Sam Stosur and Zhang Shuai. In July, Strýcová reached the semifinals of Wimbledon in singles and, together with Hsieh Su-wei, won the title in doubles. This was, with 33 years of age, her career best in a Grand Slam tournament for both singles and doubles. She beat four seeded players until she was defeated in the semifinal by 23 time Grand Slam champion Serena Williams.

=== 2020 ===
Strýcová kicked off her 2020 season at the Brisbane International. She upset seventh seed Johanna Konta in the first round. She lost in the second round to Alison Riske. In doubles, she and Hsieh Su-wei won the title beating Ashleigh Barty/Kiki Bertens in the final. Playing at the first edition of the Adelaide International, she fell in the first round to qualifier Bernarda Pera. Seeded 32nd at the Australian Open, she was defeated in the first round by Sorana Cîrstea.

=== 2021 ===
Strýcová started her 2021 season in February at the first edition of the Grampians Trophy. She lost in the first round to Bethanie Mattek-Sands. At the Australian Open, she was defeated in the first round by Svetlana Kuznetsova.

On 4 May 2021, Strýcová announced her retirement from tennis whilst leaving open the possibility of a final match at the 2022 Wimbledon Championships, or at a tournament in the Czech Republic. She did not play at the 2022 Wimbledon Championships.

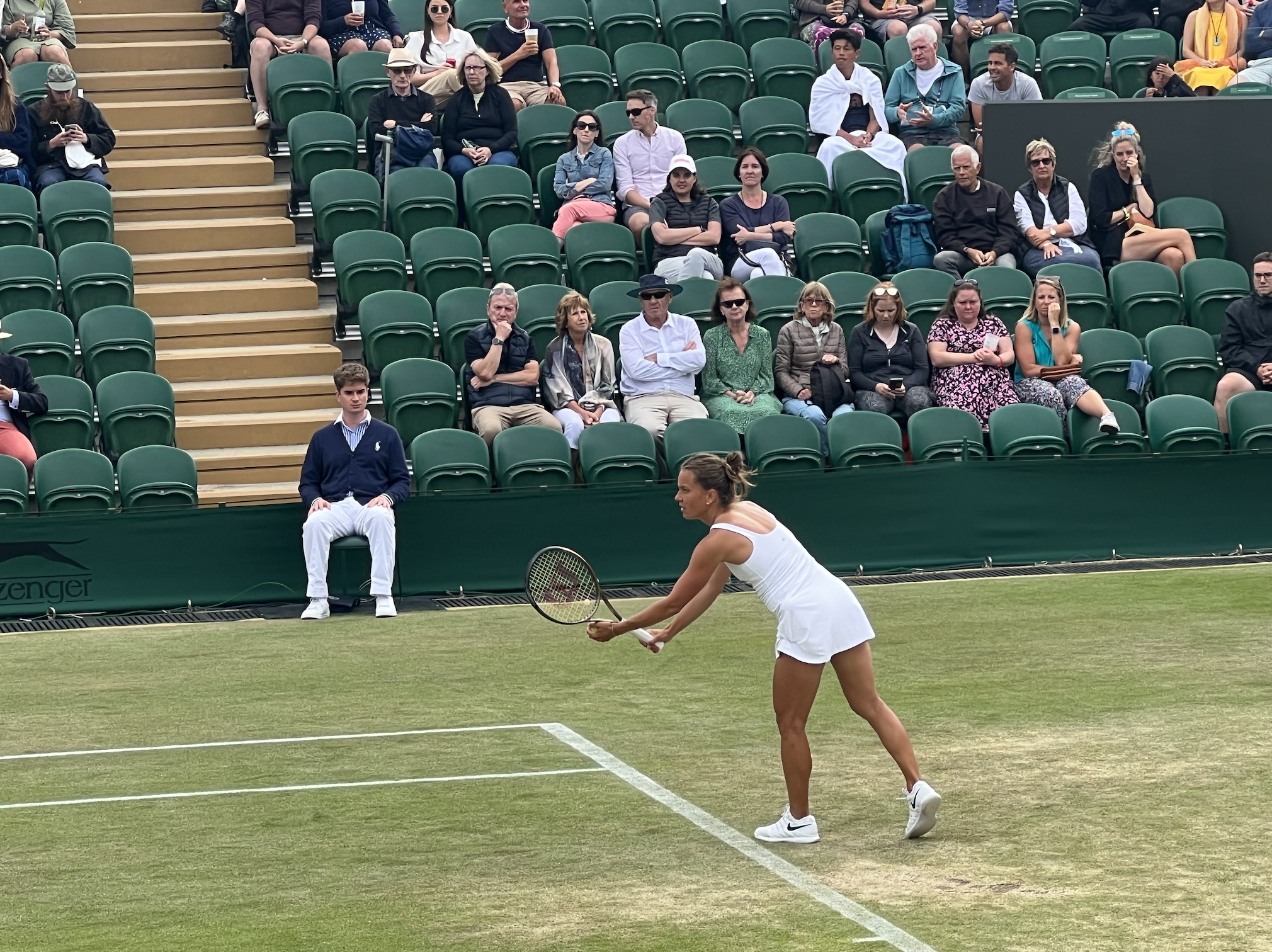
Strýcová playing at Wimbledon in 2023.

=== 2023: Comeback, second Wimbledon doubles title, Retirement ===
On 22 March 2023, Strýcová announced her return to the game for one last season. In April, she entered the 2023 Mutua Madrid Open singles and doubles events, using a protected ranking with previous partner Hsieh Su-wei.

In July, Strýcová and Hsieh won their second Wimbledon doubles title, beating Storm Hunter and Elise Mertens in the final. Strýcová moved up 248 places to 35th in the doubles rankings with this win. She played her last professional tournament at the 2023 US Open in doubles with compatriot Marketa Vondrousova where they defeated the top seeded pair of compatriots Barbora Krejcikova and Katerina Siniakova in the second round. Her last professional match was a quarterfinal in mixed doubles with Santiago Gonzalez.

== Personal life ==
Strýcová was married to former tennis player Jakub Záhlava, a cousin of Sandra Záhlavová. He was also her coach, having been in that position since 2007. Since the couple divorced in 2015, she has used her maiden name. On 26 March 2021, she announced her pregnancy on social media. In November 2023 she announced another pregnancy. Strýcová gave birth to a daughter, Josefína, in May 2024.

== Career statistics ==
=== Grand Slam performance timelines ===
Key
W	F	SF	QF	#R	RR	Q#	DNQ	A	NH

(W) winner; (F) finalist; (SF) semifinalist; (QF) quarterfinalist; (#R) rounds 4, 3, 2, 1; (RR) round-robin stage; (Q#) qualification round; (DNQ) did not qualify; (A) absent; (NH) not held; (SR) strike rate (events won / competed); (W–L) win–loss record.

==== Singles ====
Tournament	2003	2004	2005	2006	2007	2008	2009	2010	2011	2012	2013	2014	2015	2016	2017	2018	2019	2020	2021	2022	2023	SR	W–L	Win %
Australian Open	Q2	2R	1R	Q2	Q2	Q2	1R	2R	3R	2R	A	2R	3R	4R	4R	4R	1R	1R	1R	A	A	0 / 14	17–14	55%
French Open	A	2R	1R	Q3	Q1	Q1	1R	1R	1R	1R	1R	1R	1R	3R	2R	4R	1R	2R	A	A	A	0 / 14	8–14	36%
Wimbledon	1R	1R	2R	Q3	1R	3R	1R	3R	2R	1R	2R	QF	1R	3R	2R	3R	SF	NH	A	A	2R	0 / 17	22–17	56%
US Open	Q3	1R	1R	Q2	Q1	1R	2R	1R	1R	1R	Q1	3R	3R	1R	2R	3R	1R	A	A	A	1R	0 / 14	8–14	36%
Win–loss	0–1	2–4	1–4	0–0	0–1	2–2	1–4	3–4	3–4	1–4	1–2	7–4	4–4	7–4	6–4	10–4	5–4	1–2	0–1	0-0	1–2	0 / 59	55–59	48%

==== Doubles ====
Tournament	2005	2006	2007	2008	2009	2010	2011	2012	2013	2014	2015	2016	2017	2018	2019	2020	2021	2022	2023	SR	W–L	Win%
Australian Open	A	1R	1R	3R	2R	2R	3R	2R	A	2R	SF	3R	3R	QF	SF	F	2R	A	A	0 / 15	29–15	66%
French Open	2R	3R	1R	1R	2R	3R	1R	1R	1R	2R	QF	2R	A	SF	3R	3R	A	A	A	0 / 15	19–15	56%
Wimbledon	3R	2R	2R	A	3R	3R	3R	2R	QF	2R	3R	3R	3R	3R	W	NH	A	A	W	2 / 15	35–13	73%
US Open	1R	1R	1R	1R	2R	3R	QF	2R	2R	SF	3R	QF	SF	3R	3R	A	A	A	3R	0 / 16	27–15	64%
Win–loss	3–3	3–4	1–4	2–3	5–4	7–4	7–4	3–4	4–3	7–4	11–4	8–4	8–3	11–4	14–3	7–2	1–1	0–0	8–0	2 / 61	110–58	65%

=== Grand Slam tournament finals ===
==== Doubles: 3 (2 titles, 1 runner-up) ====
Result	Year	Tournament	Surface	Partner	Opponents	Score
Win	2019	Wimbledon	Grass	(Chinese Taipei) Hsieh Su-wei	(Canada) Gabriela Dabrowski (China) Xu Yifan	6–2, 6–4
Loss	2020	Australian Open	Hard	(Chinese Taipei) Hsieh Su-wei	(Hungary) Tímea Babos (France) Kristina Mladenovic	2–6, 1–6
Win	2023	Wimbledon (2)	Grass	(Chinese Taipei) Hsieh Su-wei	(Australia) Storm Hunter (Belgium) Elise Mertens	7–5, 6–4

=== Year-end championships finals ===
==== Doubles: 1 (runner-up) ====
Result	Year	Tournament	Surface	Partner	Opponents	Score
Loss	2019	WTA Finals, Shenzhen	Hard (i)	(Chinese Taipei) Hsieh Su-wei	(Hungary) Tímea Babos (France) Kristina Mladenovic	1–6, 3–6

=== Olympic medal matches ===
==== Doubles: 1 (bronze medal) ====
Result	Year	Tournament	Surface	Partner	Opponents	Score
Bronze	2016	Rio Olympics	Hard	(Czech Republic) Lucie Šafářová	(Czech Republic) Andrea Hlaváčková (Czech Republic) Lucie Hradecká	7–5, 6–1

Awards
Preceded by Svetlana Kuznetsova	ITF Junior World Champion; 2002	Succeeded by Kirsten Flipkens
