= WTA Tournament Awards =

The WTA Tournament Awards are a series of annual Women's Tennis Association (WTA) awards given since the 1995 WTA Tour to the most successful tournaments on the WTA calendar. No awards were given in 2020 due to the shortening of the season caused by the COVID-19 pandemic.

== Premier Mandatory Tournament of the Year ==
Year	Tournament	City	Country
2014	BNP Paribas Open	Indian Wells	United States
2015	BNP Paribas Open (2)	Indian Wells	United States
2016	BNP Paribas Open (3)	Indian Wells	United States
2017	BNP Paribas Open (4)	Indian Wells	United States
2018	BNP Paribas Open (5)	Indian Wells	United States
2019	BNP Paribas Open (6)	Indian Wells	United States
2020	Not awarded due to the COVID-19 pandemic		
2021	BNP Paribas Open (7)	Indian Wells	United States
2022	BNP Paribas Open (8)	Indian Wells	United States
2023	BNP Paribas Open (9)	Indian Wells	United States

== Premier 5 Tournament of the Year ==
Year	Tournament	City	Country
2014	Western & Southern Open	Cincinnati	United States
2015	Dubai Tennis Championships	Dubai	United Arab Emirates
2016	Internazionali BNL d'Italia	Rome	Italy
2017	Internazionali BNL d'Italia (2)	Rome	Italy
2018	Internazionali BNL d'Italia (3)	Rome	Italy
2019	Dubai Tennis Championships (2)	Dubai	United Arab Emirates
2020	Not awarded due to the COVID-19 pandemic		

== Premier Tournament of the Year ==
Year	Tournament	City	Country
1995	Lipton Championships	Miami	United States
1996	Toshiba Classic	San Diego	United States
1997	State Farm Evert Cup	Indian Wells	United States
1998	du Maurier Open	Montréal	Canada
1999	du Maurier Open	Toronto	Canada
2000	du Maurier Open (2)	Montréal	Canada
2001	Dubai Duty Free Women's Open	Dubai	United Arab Emirates
2002	Dubai Duty Free Women's Open (2)	Dubai	United Arab Emirates
2003	Kremlin Cup	Moscow	Russia
2004	NASDAQ-100 Open (2)	Miami	United States
2005	Pacific Life Open (2)	Indian Wells	United States
2006	Pacific Life Open (3)	Indian Wells	United States
2007	Porsche Tennis Grand Prix	Stuttgart	Germany
2008	Porsche Tennis Grand Prix (2)	Stuttgart	Germany
2009	BNP Paribas Open (4)	Indian Wells	United States
2010	Porsche Tennis Grand Prix (3)	Stuttgart	Germany
2011	Porsche Tennis Grand Prix (4)	Stuttgart	Germany
2012	Porsche Tennis Grand Prix (5)	Stuttgart	Germany
2013	BNP Paribas Open (4)	Indian Wells	United States
2014	Porsche Tennis Grand Prix (6)	Stuttgart	Germany
2015	Porsche Tennis Grand Prix (7)	Stuttgart	Germany
2016	Porsche Tennis Grand Prix (8)	Stuttgart	Germany
2017	Porsche Tennis Grand Prix (9)	Stuttgart	Germany
2018	St. Petersburg Ladies' Trophy	St. Petersburg	Russia
2019	St. Petersburg Ladies' Trophy (2)	St. Petersburg	Russia
2019	Porsche Tennis Grand Prix (10)	Stuttgart	Germany
2020	Not awarded due to the COVID-19 pandemic		
2021	St. Petersburg Ladies' Trophy (3)	St. Petersburg	Russia
2022	Credit One Charleston Open	Charleston	United States
2023	Credit One Charleston Open (2)	Charleston	United States

== International Tournament of the Year ==
From 1995–2013 one tournament was recognised, from 2014–2016 the award has been distributed in regional categories. From 2017 on, the award was given to one tournament.

Year	Tournament	City	Country
1995	Bell Challenge	Québec City	Canada
1996	Bell Challenge (2)	Québec City	Canada
1997	Bell Challenge (3)	Québec City	Canada
1998	Bell Challenge (4)	Québec City	Canada
1999	Bell Challenge (5)	Québec City	Canada
2000	Bell Challenge (6)	Québec City	Canada
2001	Abierto Mexicano Pegaso	Acapulco	Mexico
2002	Abierto Mexicano Pegaso (2)	Acapulco	Mexico
2003	Uncle Tobys Hardcourts	Gold Coast	Australia
2004	Abierto Mexicano Telcel (3)	Acapulco	Mexico
2004	Bell Challenge (7)	Québec City	Canada
2005	Bell Challenge (8)	Québec City	Canada
2006	Abierto Mexicano Telcel (4)	Acapulco	Mexico
2007	Commonwealth Bank Tennis Classic	Bali	Indonesia
2008	Commonwealth Bank Tennis Classic (2)	Bali	Indonesia
2009	Abierto Mexicano Telcel (5)	Acapulco	Mexico
2010	PTT Pattaya Open	Pattaya City	Thailand
2011	Abierto Mexicano Telcel (6)	Acapulco	Mexico
2012	Swedish Open	Båstad	Sweden
2013	Abierto Mexicano Telcel (7)	Acapulco	Mexico
2014–16	Award distributed in regional categories		
2017	Abierto Mexicano Telcel (8)	Acapulco	Mexico
2018	Prudential Hong Kong Tennis Open	Hong Kong	Hong Kong
2019	ASB Classic	Auckland	New Zealand
2019	Abierto Mexicano Telcel (9)	Acapulco	Mexico
2020	Not awarded due to the COVID-19 pandemic		
2021	Tenerife Ladies Open	Guía de Isora	Spain
2021	Phillip Island Trophy	Melbourne	Australia
2022	Transylvania Open	Cluj-Napoca	Romania
2023	Transylvania Open (2)	Cluj-Napoca	Romania

=== Americas ===
Year	Tournament	City	Country
2014	Abierto Mexicano Telcel	Acapulco	Mexico
2015	Abierto Mexicano Telcel (2)	Acapulco	Mexico
2016	Abierto Mexicano Telcel (3)	Acapulco	Mexico

=== Asia / Pacific ===
Year	Tournament	City	Country
2014	ASB Classic	Auckland	New Zealand
2015	ASB Classic (2)	Auckland	New Zealand
2016	ASB Classic (3)	Auckland	New Zealand

=== Europe / Middle East ===
Year	Tournament	City	Country
2014	Swedish Open	Båstad	Sweden
2015	Swedish Open (2)	Båstad	Sweden
2016	Swedish Open (3)	Båstad	Sweden
