= 1999 Challenge Bell – Doubles =

Doubles
- 1999 Challenge Bell

Final
- Champions: (United States) Amy Frazier (United States) Katie Schlukebir
- Runners-up: (Zimbabwe) Cara Black (United States) Debbie Graham
- Score: 6–2, 6–3

Details
- Draw: 16
- Seeds: 4

Events
Singles	Doubles
← 1998 ·	Tournoi de Québec	· 2000 →

Lori McNeil and Kimberly Po were the defending champions, but lost in the quarterfinals to Amy Frazier and Katie Schlukebir.

Frazier and Schlukebir went on to win the title, defeating Cara Black and Debbie Graham 6–2, 6–3 in the final.

== Seeds ==
1. (South Africa) Amanda Coetzer / (United States) Corina Morariu (quarterfinals, withdrew)
2. (United States) Lori McNeil / (United States) Kimberly Po (quarterfinals)
3. (Canada) Sonya Jeyaseelan / (Netherlands) Seda Noorlander (quarterfinals, withdrew)
4. (Zimbabwe) Cara Black / (United States) Debbie Graham (final)

== Draw ==
=== Key ===
- Q = Qualifier
- WC = Wild card
- LL = Lucky loser
- Alt = Alternate
- SE = Special exempt
- PR = Protected ranking
- ITF = ITF entry
- JE = Junior exempt
- w/o = Walkover
- r = Retired
- d = Defaulted
- SR = Special ranking

First round
1	(South Africa) A Coetzer (United States) C Morariu	6	6
Q	(Canada) M Drake (Russia) L Skavronskaia	2	3
(United States) L Lee (United States) M Shaughnessy	6	5	6
(Japan) S Asagoe (Canada) M-È Pelletier	4	7	0
4	(Zimbabwe) C Black (United States) D Graham	6	6
WC	(Canada) M Marois (Canada) M Nejedly	4	4
(United States) L Osterloh (United States) T Snyder	3	6	5
(Canada) R Kolbovic (Canada) V Webb	6	3	7
(South Africa) S De Beer (Japan) N Miyagi	4	6	7
(Germany) J Abe (Belgium) J Henin	6	3	6
(United States) C Rubin (United States) M Washington	3	4
3	(Canada) S Jeyaseelan (Netherlands) S Noorlander	6	6
(South Africa) K Grant (United States) T Singian	3	6
(United States) A Frazier (United States) K Schlukebir	6	7
(Bulgaria) P Stoyanova (United States) J Watanabe	2	2
2	(United States) L McNeil (United States) K Po	6	6

Quarterfinals
1	(South Africa) A Coetzer (United States) C Morariu
(United States) L Lee (United States) M Shaughnessy	w/o
4	(Zimbabwe) C Black (United States) D Graham	6	6
(Canada) R Kolbovic (Canada) V Webb	4	4
(South Africa) S De Beer (Japan) N Miyagi	w/o
3	(Canada) S Jeyaseelan (Netherlands) S Noorlander
(United States) A Frazier (United States) K Schlukebir	6	6
2	(United States) L McNeil (United States) K Po	1	3

Semifinals
(United States) L Lee (United States) M Shaughnessy	6	2
4	(Zimbabwe) C Black (United States) D Graham	7	6
(South Africa) S De Beer (Japan) N Miyagi	2	6
(United States) A Frazier (United States) K Schlukebir	6	7

Final
4	(Zimbabwe) C Black (United States) D Graham	2	3
(United States) A Frazier (United States) K Schlukebir	6	6
