= 2000 Challenge Bell – Doubles =

Doubles
- 2000 Challenge Bell

Final
- Champions: (Australia) Nicole Pratt (United States) Meghann Shaughnessy
- Runners-up: (Belgium) Els Callens (United States) Kimberly Po
- Score: 6–3, 6–4

Details
- Draw: 16
- Seeds: 4

Events
Singles	Doubles
← 1999 ·	Tournoi de Québec	· 2001 →

Amy Frazier and Katie Schlukebir were the defending champions, but lost in the quarterfinals to Alina Jidkova and Tatiana Poutchek.

Nicole Pratt and Meghann Shaughnessy won the title, defeating Els Callens and Kimberly Po 6–3, 6–4 in the final.

== Seeds ==
1. (Belgium) Els Callens / (United States) Kimberly Po (final)
2. (Australia) Nicole Pratt / (United States) Meghann Shaughnessy (champions)
3. (United States) Amy Frazier / (United States) Katie Schlukebir (quarterfinals)
4. (Canada) Sonya Jeyaseelan / (Netherlands) Seda Noorlander (quarterfinals)

== Draw ==
=== Key ===
- Q = Qualifier
- WC = Wild card
- LL = Lucky loser
- Alt = Alternate
- SE = Special exempt
- PR = Protected ranking
- ITF = ITF entry
- JE = Junior exempt
- w/o = Walkover
- r = Retired
- d = Defaulted
- SR = Special ranking

First round
1	(Belgium) E Callens (United States) K Po	6	6
(Canada) M-È Pelletier (United States) T Snyder	2	3
(United States) L McNeil (United States) M Washington	7^{7}	2	4
(United States) L Osterloh (United States) A Stevenson	6^{4}	6	6
4	(Canada) S Jeyaseelan (Netherlands) S Noorlander	6	6
(Chinese Taipei) J Lee (United States) H Parkinson	3	4
(South Africa) K Grant (Venezuela) M Vento	6	6
WC	(Canada) C Goulet (Canada) A Loncaric	1	2
(Russia) A Jidkova (Belarus) T Poutchek	6	6
(Canada) M Marois (Canada) J Nejedly	2	0
(United States) J Hopkins (United States) C Rubin	6	4	1
3	(United States) A Frazier (United States) K Schlukebir	3	6	6
(United States) E deLone (United States) B Rippner	6	6
Q	(Canada) I Plesu (Canada) M-P Pouliot	3	1
(Canada) R Kolbovic (United States) S Reeves	7	1	0
2	(Australia) N Pratt (United States) M Shaughnessy	5	6	6

Quarterfinals
1	(Belgium) E Callens (United States) K Po	w/o
(United States) L Osterloh (United States) A Stevenson
4	(Canada) S Jeyaseelan (Netherlands) S Noorlander	4	6	2
(South Africa) K Grant (Venezuela) M Vento	6	4	6
(Russia) A Jidkova (Belarus) T Poutchek	6	6
3	(United States) A Frazier (United States) K Schlukebir	2	4
(United States) E deLone (United States) B Rippner	4	2
2	(Australia) N Pratt (United States) M Shaughnessy	6	6

Semifinals
1	(Belgium) E Callens (United States) K Po	6	6
(South Africa) K Grant (Venezuela) M Vento	4	2
(Russia) A Jidkova (Belarus) T Poutchek	3	7	3
2	(Australia) N Pratt (United States) M Shaughnessy	6	5	6

Final
1	(Belgium) E Callens (United States) K Po	3	4
2	(Australia) N Pratt (United States) M Shaughnessy	6	6
