= 1997 Challenge Bell – Doubles =

Doubles
- 1997 Challenge Bell

Final
- Champions: (United States) Lisa Raymond; (Australia) Rennae Stubbs
- Runners-up: (France) Alexandra Fusai; (France) Nathalie Tauziat
- Score: 6–4, 5–7, 7–5

Details
- Draw: 16
- Seeds: 4

Events
Singles	Doubles
← 1996 ·	Tournoi de Québec	· 1998 →

Debbie Graham and Brenda Schultz-McCarthy were the defending champions, but decided not to compete together. Graham partnered with Mariaan de Swardt, but lost in the semifinals to Alexandra Fusai and Nathalie Tauziat. Schultz-McCarthy partnered with Rebecca Jensen, but lost in the first round to Patricia Hy-Boulais and Chanda Rubin.

Lisa Raymond and Rennae Stubbs won the title, defeating Fusai and Tauziat 6–4, 5–7, 7–5 in the final.

== Seeds ==
1. (United States) Lisa Raymond / (Australia) Rennae Stubbs (champions)
2. (France) Alexandra Fusai / (France) Nathalie Tauziat (final)
3. (United States) Amy Frazier / (Japan) Rika Hiraki (quarterfinals)
4. (Canada) Patricia Hy-Boulais / (United States) Chanda Rubin (semifinals)

== Draw ==
=== Key ===
- Q = Qualifier
- WC = Wild card
- LL = Lucky loser
- Alt = Alternate
- ITF = ITF entry
- PR = Protected ranking
- SR = Special ranking
- SE = Special exempt
- JE = Junior exempt
- JR = Junior Accelerator Programme entrant
- CO = College Accelerator Programme entrant
- NG = Next Gen Accelerator Program entrant
- w/o = Walkover
- r = Retired
- d = Defaulted

First round

Quarterfinals

Semifinals

Final

1
- (United States) L Raymond
- (Australia) R Stubbs
6
4
6

- (Poland) M Grzybowska
- (Croatia) M Murić
4
6
4

1
- (United States) L Raymond
- (Australia) R Stubbs
6
6

Q
- (Australia) A Ellwood
- (United States) A Miller
7
4
6

Q
- (Australia) A Ellwood
- (United States) A Miller
4
3

WC
- (Canada) M Bernard
- (Canada) I Plesu
6
6
1

1
- (United States) L Raymond
- (Australia) R Stubbs
w/o

4
- (Canada) P Hy-Boulais
- (United States) C Rubin
7
4
6

- (Canada) S Jeyaseelan
- (Canada) R Simpson

- (United States) R Jensen
- (Netherlands) B Schultz-McCarthy
6
6
3

4
- (Canada) P Hy-Boulais
- (United States) C Rubin

- (Canada) S Jeyaseelan
- (Canada) R Simpson
7
6

- (Canada) S Jeyaseelan
- (Canada) R Simpson
w/o

- (Belgium) E Callens
- (Italy) L Golarsa
5
4

1
- (United States) L Raymond
- (Australia) R Stubbs
6
5
7

- (South Africa) M de Swardt
- (United States) D Graham
6
6

2
- (France) A Fusai
- (France) N Tauziat
4
7
5

- (France) S Pitkowski
- (United States) M Tu
2
0

- (South Africa) M de Swardt
- (United States) D Graham
6
6

- (France) A Dechaume-Balleret
- (Belgium) D Van Roost
5
3

3
- (United States) A Frazier
- (Japan) R Hiraki
4
2

3
- (United States) A Frazier
- (Japan) R Hiraki
7
6

- (South Africa) M de Swardt
- (United States) D Graham
5
3

- (Canada) M Drake
- (Canada) R Kolbovic
1
0

2
- (France) A Fusai
- (France) N Tauziat
7
6

- (United States) J Lee
- (United States) L Lee
6
6

- (United States) J Lee
- (United States) L Lee
4
3

- (Romania) C Cristea
- (United States) C Morariu
3
3

2
- (France) A Fusai
- (France) N Tauziat
6
6

2
- (France) A Fusai
- (France) N Tauziat
6
6
