= 2006 Tashkent Open – Singles =

Singles
- 2006 Tashkent Open

Final
- Champion: (China) Sun Tiantian
- Runner-up: (Uzbekistan) Iroda Tulyaganova
- Score: 6–2, 6–4

Details
- Draw: 32
- Seeds: 8

Events
Singles	Doubles
- Tashkent Open

Michaëlla Krajicek was the defending champion, but chose not participate. She played in the Porsche Tennis Grand Prix instead, which was held in the same week at Stuttgart, Germany.
Sun Tiantian won the title, defeating Iroda Tulyaganova in the final, 6–2, 6–4.

== Seeds ==
1. (Italy) Maria Elena Camerin (quarterfinals)
2. (Russia) Elena Vesnina (second round)
3. (India) Sania Mirza (quarterfinals)
4. (Ukraine) ~~Alona Bondarenko~~ (withdrew due to a right knee inflammation)
5. (Belarus) Anastasiya Yakimova (first round)
6. (Russia) Olga Puchkova (semifinals)
7. (Russia) Galina Voskoboeva (first round)
8. (Russia) Anastasia Rodionova (quarterfinals)

== Draw ==
Key

- Q = Qualifier
- WC = Wild card
- LL = Lucky loser
- Alt = Alternate
- ITF = ITF entry
- PR = Protected ranking
- SR = Special ranking
- SE = Special exempt
- JE = Junior exempt
- JR = Junior Accelerator Programme entrant
- CO = College Accelerator Programme entrant
- NG = Next Gen Accelerator Program entrant
- w/o = Walkover
- r = Retired
- d = Defaulted

=== Finals ===
Semifinals
(Belarus) Victoria Azarenka	5	4
(China) Sun Tiantian	7	6
6	(Russia) Olga Puchkova	4	0
WC	(Uzbekistan) Iroda Tulyaganova	6	6

Final
(China) Sun Tiantian	6	6
WC	(Uzbekistan) Iroda Tulyaganova	2	4

=== Top half ===
First round
1	(Italy) ME Camerin	6	5	7
Q	(China) J Ren	1	7	5
(Hungary) K Nagy	5	3
(Russia) A Kudryavtseva	7	6
(Belarus) V Azarenka	7	6
(Croatia) S Ančić	5	0
Q	(Slovakia) D Cibulková	5	6	7^{7}
7	(Russia) G Voskoboeva	7	4	6^{2}
LL	(Ukraine) M Koryttseva	7	1	2
(China) T Sun	5	6	6
(Chinese Taipei) C-w Chan	4	5
(Belarus) T Poutchek	6	7
LL	(Belarus) E Dzehalevich	6	6
(United Kingdom) A Keothavong	3	2
Q	(Belarus) O Govortsova	6	4	1
8	(Russia) A Rodionova	1	6	6

Second round
1	(Italy) ME Camerin	6	6
(Russia) A Kudryavtseva	1	3
(Belarus) V Azarenka	6	6
Q	(Slovakia) D Cibulková	4	4
(China) T Sun	6	6
(Belarus) T Poutchek	4	4
LL	(Belarus) E Dzehalevich	4	6	3
8	(Russia) A Rodionova	6	4	6

Quarterfinals
1	(Italy) ME Camerin	0	1
(Belarus) V Azarenka	6	6
(China) T Sun	6	6
8	(Russia) A Rodionova	1	3

Semifinals
(Belarus) V Azarenka	5	4
(China) T Sun	7	6

=== Bottom half ===
First round
6	(Russia) O Puchkova	6^{4}	6	7
(Russia) L Skavronskaia	7^{7}	2	5
(France) O Sanchez	7^{7}	7^{8}
(Italy) A Brianti	6^{4}	6^{6}
(Canada) S Dubois	2	2
(Czech Republic) H Šromová	6	6
(France) P Parmentier	3	1
3	(India) S Mirza	6	6
5	(Belarus) A Yakimova	3	6^{5}
WC	(Uzbekistan) I Tulyaganova	6	7^{7}
(Thailand) T Tanasugarn	6	7
WC	(Uzbekistan) A Amanmuradova	4	5
(Ukraine) K Bondarenko	6	6
(Switzerland) E Gagliardi	3	4
Q	(China) S Sun	6	5	2
2	(Russia) E Vesnina	0	7	6

Second round
6	(Russia) O Puchkova	7	6
(France) O Sanchez	5	1
(Czech Republic) H Šromová	4	5
3	(India) S Mirza	6	7
WC	(Uzbekistan) I Tulyaganova	6	6
(Thailand) T Tanasugarn	4	1
(Ukraine) K Bondarenko	3	6	6
2	(Russia) E Vesnina	6	4	4

Quarterfinals
6	(Russia) O Puchkova	6	4	6
3	(India) S Mirza	4	6	0
WC	(Uzbekistan) I Tulyaganova	6	6
(Ukraine) K Bondarenko	1	2

Semifinals
6	(Russia) O Puchkova	4	0
WC	(Uzbekistan) I Tulyaganova	6	6
