= 1997 Challenge Bell – Singles =

Singles
- 1997 Challenge Bell

Final
- Champion: (Netherlands) Brenda Schultz-McCarthy
- Runner-up: (Belgium) Dominique Van Roost
- Score: 6–4, 6–7^{(4–7)}, 7–5

Details
- Draw: 30
- Seeds: 8

Events
Singles	Doubles
← 1996 ·	Tournoi de Québec	· 1998 →

Lisa Raymond was the defending champion, but lost in the semifinals to Dominique Van Roost.

Brenda Schultz-McCarthy won the title, defeating Van Roost 6–4, 6–7^{(4–7)}, 7–5 in the final.

== Seeds ==
1. (Netherlands) Brenda Schultz-McCarthy (champion)
2. (United States) Lisa Raymond (semifinals)
3. (France) Nathalie Tauziat (second round)
4. (Belgium) Dominique Van Roost (final)
5. (United States) Chanda Rubin (semifinals)
6. (United States) Amy Frazier (second round)
7. (Poland) Magdalena Grzybowska (quarterfinals)
8. (Austria) Marion Maruska (first round)

== Draw ==
=== Key ===
- Q = Qualifier
- WC = Wild card
- LL = Lucky loser
- Alt = Alternate
- ITF = ITF entry
- PR = Protected ranking
- SR = Special ranking
- SE = Special exempt
- JE = Junior exempt
- JR = Junior Accelerator Programme entrant
- CO = College Accelerator Programme entrant
- NG = Next Gen Accelerator Program entrant
- w/o = Walkover
- r = Retired
- d = Defaulted

=== Finals ===
Semifinals
1	(Netherlands) Brenda Schultz-McCarthy	6	6
5	(United States) Chanda Rubin	2	4
4	(Belgium) Dominique Van Roost	6	3	6
2	(United States) Lisa Raymond	2	6	1

Final
1	(Netherlands) Brenda Schultz-McCarthy	6	6	7
4	(Belgium) Dominique Van Roost	4	7	5

=== Top half ===
First round
Q	(Mexico) A Gavaldón	6	5	0
WC	(Canada) S Jeyaseelan	3	7	6
(France) A Dechaume-Balleret	3	1
(Italy) L Golarsa	6	6
(United States) C Morariu	6	2	6
8	(Austria) M Maruska	3	6	4
3	(France) N Tauziat	6	6	6
(Romania) C Cristea	1	7	3
(Venezuela) M Vento	6	6
(United States) M Tu	3	2
(Canada) P Hy-Boulais	6	3	7
(France) A Fusai	2	6	6
(France) S Pitkowski	5	7	5
5	(United States) C Rubin	7	6	7

Second round
1	(Netherlands) B Schultz-McCarthy	6	6
WC	(Canada) S Jeyaseelan	4	1
(Italy) L Golarsa	0	6	1
(United States) C Morariu	6	2	6
3	(France) N Tauziat	4	3
(Venezuela) M Vento	6	6
(Canada) P Hy-Boulais	3	4
5	(United States) C Rubin	6	6

Quarterfinals
1	(Netherlands) B Schultz-McCarthy	1	6	6
(United States) C Morariu	6	2	1
(Venezuela) M Vento	4	1
5	(United States) C Rubin	6	6

Semifinals
1	(Netherlands) B Schultz-McCarthy	6	6
5	(United States) C Rubin	2	4

=== Bottom half ===
First round
6	(United States) A Frazier	6	6
(Australia) A Ellwood	3	4
(Japan) R Hiraki	3	6	5
Q	(United States) J Watanabe	6	4	7
WC	(Canada) I Plesu	0	1
(United States) A Miller	6	6
(Belgium) E Callens	4	2
4	(Belgium) D Van Roost	6	6
7	(Poland) M Grzybowska	1	6	6
Q	(Canada) R Simpson	6	1	3
PR	(South Africa) M de Swardt	6	4	6
Q	(Australia) R Stubbs	4	6	3
(United States) S Cacic	2	3
(Italy) F Lubiani	6	6

Second round
6	(United States) A Frazier	3	6	4
Q	(United States) J Watanabe	6	2	6
(United States) A Miller	1	5
4	(Belgium) D Van Roost	6	7
7	(Poland) M Grzybowska	6	2	6
PR	(South Africa) M de Swardt	2	6	3
(Italy) F Lubiani	3	7	4
2	(United States) L Raymond	6	6	6

Quarterfinals
Q	(United States) J Watanabe	1	2
4	(Belgium) D Van Roost	6	6
7	(Poland) M Grzybowska	2	6
2	(United States) L Raymond	6	7

Semifinals
4	(Belgium) D Van Roost	6	3	6
2	(United States) L Raymond	2	6	1
