= 1999 Challenge Bell – Singles =

Singles
- 1999 Challenge Bell

Final
- Champion: (United States) Jennifer Capriati
- Runner-up: (United States) Chanda Rubin
- Score: 4–6, 6–1, 6–2

Details
- Draw: 30
- Seeds: 8

Events
Singles	Doubles
← 1998 ·	Tournoi de Québec	· 2000 →

Tara Snyder was the defending champion, but lost in the semifinals to Chanda Rubin.

Jennifer Capriati won the title, defeating Rubin 4–6, 6–1, 6–2 in the final.

== Seeds ==
1. (South Africa) Amanda Coetzer (second round)
2. (United States) Amy Frazier (semifinals)
3. (United States) Chanda Rubin (final)
4. (United States) Jennifer Capriati (champion)
5. N/A
6. (United States) Lisa Raymond (quarterfinals)
7. (United States) Corina Morariu (second round)
8. (United States) Alexandra Stevenson (second round)

== Draw ==
=== Key ===
- Q = Qualifier
- WC = Wild card
- LL = Lucky loser
- Alt = Alternate
- SE = Special exempt
- PR = Protected ranking
- ITF = ITF entry
- JE = Junior exempt
- w/o = Walkover
- r = Retired
- d = Defaulted
- SR = Special ranking

=== Finals ===
Semifinals
(United States) Tara Snyder	1	3
3	(United States) Chanda Rubin	6	6
4	(United States) Jennifer Capriati	2	6	7
2	(United States) Amy Frazier	6	0	5

Final
3	(United States) Chanda Rubin	6	1	2
4	(United States) Jennifer Capriati	4	6	6

=== Top half ===
First round
(United States) T Snyder	6	4	6
(United States) L Osterloh	3	6	2
(Zimbabwe) C Black	6	6	6
(United States) E deLone	7	3	3
(Canada) M Drake	6	6	6
8	(United States) A Stevenson	4	7	7
3	(United States) C Rubin	7	6
WC	(Canada) S Jeyaseelan	6	3
(Australia) N Pratt	6	7
(Switzerland) E Gagliardi	3	6
Q	(United States) L Wild	4	2
Q	(Japan) S Asagoe	6	6
Q	(United States) M Washington	6	6
LL	(United States) J Craybas	3	3

Second round
1	(South Africa) A Coetzer	2	7	5
(United States) T Snyder	6	5	7
(Zimbabwe) C Black	6	6
8	(United States) A Stevenson	1	3
3	(United States) C Rubin	6	6
(Australia) N Pratt	3	3
Q	(Japan) S Asagoe	3	1
Q	(United States) M Washington	6	6

Quarterfinals
(United States) T Snyder	2	6	7
(Zimbabwe) C Black	6	0	5
3	(United States) C Rubin	6	7
Q	(United States) M Washington	0	5

Semifinals
(United States) T Snyder	1	3
3	(United States) C Rubin	6	6

=== Bottom half ===
First round
6	(United States) L Raymond	6	6
(Mexico) A Gavaldón	0	3
LL	(Bulgaria) P Stoyanova	0	3
(Canada) J Nejedly	6	6
(United States) M Shaughnessy	6	3	4
(Netherlands) S Noorlander	4	6	6
(United States) J Chi	1	4
4	(United States) J Capriati	6	6
7	(United States) C Morariu	6	6
(United States) M Irvin	2	1
(Belgium) J Henin	6	6
(United States) J Hopkins	3	1
Q	(United States) K Po	6	6
WC	(Canada) M Marois	1	4

Second round
6	(United States) L Raymond	6	6
(Canada) J Nejedly	0	1
(Netherlands) S Noorlander	4	2
4	(United States) J Capriati	6	6
7	(United States) C Morariu	4	1
(Belgium) J Henin	6	6
Q	(United States) K Po	6	3
2	(United States) A Frazier	7	6

Quarterfinals
6	(United States) L Raymond	4	2
4	(United States) J Capriati	6	6
(Belgium) J Henin	6	6	5
2	(United States) A Frazier	3	7	7

Semifinals
4	(United States) J Capriati	2	6	7
2	(United States) A Frazier	6	0	5
