= 1996 Challenge Bell – Doubles =

Doubles
- 1996 Challenge Bell

Final
- Champions: (United States) Debbie Graham; (Netherlands) Brenda Schultz-McCarthy
- Runners-up: (United States) Amy Frazier; (United States) Kimberly Po
- Score: 6–1, 6–4

Details
- Draw: 16
- Seeds: 4

Events
Singles	Doubles
← 1995 ·	Tournoi de Québec	· 1997 →

Nicole Arendt and Manon Bollegraf were the defending champions, but Bollegraf decided not to participate this year. Arendt partnered with Katrina Adams, but lost in the semifinals to Debbie Graham and Brenda Schultz-McCarthy.

Graham and Schultz-McCarthy went on to win the title, defeating Amy Frazier and Kimberly Po 6–1, 6–4 in the final.

== Seeds ==
1. (United States) Katrina Adams / (United States) Nicole Arendt (semifinals)
2. (United States) Lisa Raymond / (Australia) Rennae Stubbs (semifinals)
3. (United States) Debbie Graham / (Netherlands) Brenda Schultz-McCarthy (champions)
4. (United States) Amy Frazier / (United States) Kimberly Po (final)

== Draw ==
=== Key ===
- Q = Qualifier
- WC = Wild card
- LL = Lucky loser
- Alt = Alternate
- SE = Special exempt
- PR = Protected ranking
- ITF = ITF entry
- JE = Junior exempt
- w/o = Walkover
- r = Retired
- d = Defaulted
- SR = Special ranking

First round

Quarterfinals

Semifinals

Final

1
- (United States) K Adams
- (United States) N Arendt
6
6

- (Argentina) F Labat
- (Spain) V Ruano-Pascual
3
2

1
- (United States) K Adams
- (United States) N Arendt
7
4
6

- (Canada) S Jeyaseelan
- (Canada) R Simpson
7
4
2

- (United States) C Morariu
- (United States) T W-Jones
6
6
3

- (United States) C Morariu
- (United States) T W-Jones
5
6
6

1
- (United States) K Adams
- (United States) N Arendt
4
0

3
- (United States) D Graham
- (Netherlands) B Schultz-McCarthy
7
6

3
- (United States) D Graham
- (Netherlands) B Schultz-McCarthy
6
6

- (Canada) P Hy-Boulais
- (Russia) E Likhovtseva
6
3

3
- (United States) D Graham
- (Netherlands) B Schultz-McCarthy
6
2
6

WC
- (Canada) I Plesu
- (Canada) C Popescu
3
1

- (Belgium) E Callens
- (Belgium) N Feber
2
6
3

- (Belgium) E Callens
- (Belgium) N Feber
6
6

3
- (United States) D Graham
- (Netherlands) B Schultz-McCarthy
6
6

Q
- (Canada) M Drake
- (Canada) J Nejedly
4
6
6

4
- (United States) A Frazier
- (United States) K Po
1
4

- (Argentina) L Montalvo
- (Argentina) P Suárez
6
3
4

Q
- (Canada) M Drake
- (Canada) J Nejedly
5
2

LL
- (United States) J Ingram
- (United States) K Kurth
0
2

4
- (United States) A Frazier
- (United States) K Po
7
6

4
- (United States) A Frazier
- (United States) K Po
6
6

4
- (United States) A Frazier
- (United States) K Po
6
6

- (Slovenia) T Križan
- (Croatia) M Murić
3
6

2
- (United States) L Raymond
- (Australia) R Stubbs
4
3

- (United States) A Lettiere
- (Japan) N Miyagi
6
7

- (United States) A Lettiere
- (Japan) N Miyagi
4
6
1

- (Canada) M Bernard
- (Canada) C Delisle
3
3

2
- (United States) L Raymond
- (Australia) R Stubbs
6
3
6

2
- (United States) L Raymond
- (Australia) R Stubbs
6
6
