= 2000 Challenge Bell – Singles =

Singles
- 2000 Challenge Bell

Final
- Champion: (United States) Chanda Rubin
- Runner-up: (United States) Jennifer Capriati
- Score: 6–4, 6–2

Details
- Draw: 30
- Seeds: 8

Events
Singles	Doubles
← 1999 ·	Tournoi de Québec	· 2001 →

Jennifer Capriati was the defending champion, but lost in the final 6–4, 6–2 to Chanda Rubin.

== Seeds ==
1. (United States) Jennifer Capriati (final)
2. (United States) Chanda Rubin (champion)
3. (France) Julie Halard-Decugis (second round)
4. (United States) Amy Frazier (semifinals)
5. (Puerto Rico) Kristina Brandi (first round)
6. (United States) Meghann Shaughnessy (second round)
7. (Belgium) Justine Henin (withdrew)
8. (United States) Lilia Osterloh (first round)
9. (Colombia) Fabiola Zuluaga (quarterfinals)

== Draw ==
=== Key ===
- Q = Qualifier
- WC = Wild card
- LL = Lucky loser
- Alt = Alternate
- SE = Special exempt
- PR = Protected ranking
- ITF = ITF entry
- JE = Junior exempt
- w/o = Walkover
- r = Retired
- d = Defaulted
- SR = Special ranking

=== Finals ===
Semifinals
1	(United States) Jennifer Capriati	3	7	7
4	(United States) Amy Frazier	6	5	5
(United States) Meilen Tu	5	1
2	(United States) Chanda Rubin	7	6

Final
1	(United States) Jennifer Capriati	4	2
2	(United States) Chanda Rubin	6	6

=== Top half ===
First round
LL	(Chinese Taipei) J Lee	6	1	3
(Canada) J Nejedly	2	6	6
(Canada) S Jeyaseelan	6	6
(United States) M Irvin	3	3
Q	(United States) J Chi	1	2
6	(United States) M Shaughnessy	6	6
4	(United States) A Frazier	5	6	7
(Belgium) E Callens	7	4	5
Q	(United States) M Washington	2	3
Q	(United States) T Snyder	6	6
WC	(Canada) M-È Pelletier	1	4
(United States) A Stevenson	6	6
Q	(Venezuela) M Vento	6	6
8	(United States) L Osterloh	0	3

Second round
1	(United States) J Capriati	6	7^{7}
(Canada) J Nejedly	4	6^{3}
(Canada) S Jeyaseelan	7^{7}	6
6	(United States) M Shaughnessy	6^{4}	4
4	(United States) A Frazier	6	6
Q	(United States) T Snyder	4	1
(United States) A Stevenson	3	1^{r}
Q	(Venezuela) M Vento	6	2

Quarterfinals
1	(United States) J Capriati	7	6
(Canada) S Jeyaseelan	5	0
4	(United States) A Frazier	6	6
Q	(Venezuela) M Vento	2	2

Semifinals
1	(United States) J Capriati	3	7	7
4	(United States) A Frazier	6	5	5

=== Bottom half ===
First round
5	(Puerto Rico) K Brandi	4	4
(Belarus) T Poutchek	6	6
(Russia) A Jidkova	2	5
(Slovakia) Ľ Cervanová	6	7
(Canada) R Kolbovic	4	4
(United States) M Tu	6	6
(United States) H Parkinson	1	2
3	(France) J Halard-Decugis	6	6
9	(Colombia) F Zuluaga	6	6
(Australia) N Pratt	4	3
(United States) E deLone	7^{7}	7
WC	(Canada) M Marois	6^{1}	5
(United States) J Hopkins	4	7	6
(United States) B Rippner	6	5	3

Second round
(Belarus) T Poutchek	6	6
(Slovakia) Ľ Cervanová	1	0
(United States) M Tu	7^{7}	7
3	(France) J Halard-Decugis	6^{5}	5
9	(Colombia) F Zuluaga	4	6	6
(United States) E deLone	6	2	2
(United States) J Hopkins	2	5
2	(United States) C Rubin	6	7

Quarterfinals
(Belarus) T Poutchek	0	7	0
(United States) M Tu	6	5	6
9	(Colombia) F Zuluaga	3	6	2
2	(United States) C Rubin	6	3	6

Semifinals
(United States) M Tu	5	1
2	(United States) C Rubin	7	6
