= 2006 Tashkent Open =

- Date: 2–8 October
- Edition: 8th
- Category: Tier IV Series
- Draw: 32S / 16D
- Prize money: $145,000
- Surface: Hard / outdoor
- Location: Tashkent, Uzbekistan
- Venue: Tashkent Tennis Center

Champions

Singles
- (China) Sun Tiantian

Doubles
- (Belarus) Victoria Azarenka / (Belarus) Tatiana Poutchek
- Tashkent Open

The 2006 Tashkent Open was a women's tennis tournament played on outdoor hard courts. It was the eighth edition of the tournament, and part of the Tier IV Series of the 2006 WTA Tour. It took place at the Tashkent Tennis Center in Tashkent, Uzbekistan, from 2 October 2 through 8 October 2006. Unseeded Sun Tiantian won the singles title and earned $22,925 first-prize money.

== Finals ==
=== Singles ===
(China) Sun Tiantian defeated (Uzbekistan) Iroda Tulyaganova 6–2, 6–4

- It was Tiantian's only singles career title on the WTA Tour.

=== Doubles ===
(Belarus) Victoria Azarenka / (Belarus) Tatiana Poutchek defeated (Italy) Maria Elena Camerin / (Switzerland) Emmanuelle Gagliardi, walk-over
