= Sun Tiantian =

Chinese tennis player (born 1981)

Sun Tiantian 孙甜甜
- Country (sports): China
- Residence: Beijing
- Born: 12 October 1981 (age 44) Zhengzhou, Henan
- Height: 1.75 m (5 ft 9 in)
- Turned pro: 1999
- Retired: 2010
- Plays: Right-handed (two-handed backhand)
- Prize money: $1,019,657

Singles
- Career record: 217–156
- Career titles: 1 WTA, 6 ITF
- Highest ranking: No. 77 (19 March 2007)

Grand Slam singles results
- Australian Open: 1R (2006, 2007)
- French Open: 2R (2006)
- Wimbledon: 2R (2004, 2006)
- US Open: 2R (2005)

Doubles
- Career record: 268–154
- Career titles: 11 WTA, 13 ITF
- Highest ranking: No. 16 (22 October 2007)

Grand Slam doubles results
- Australian Open: QF (2007)
- French Open: QF (2005)
- Wimbledon: QF (2007)
- US Open: 3R (2005)

Mixed doubles
- Career titles: 1

Grand Slam mixed doubles results
- Australian Open: W (2008)
- French Open: SF (2007)
- Wimbledon: 3R (2007, 2004)
- US Open: 2R (2006)

Team competitions
- Fed Cup: 16–10
Medal record
Olympic Games
| Gold medal – first place | 2004 Athens | Doubles |

Sun Tiantian (Chinese: 孙甜甜; pinyin: Sūn Tiántián; Mandarin pronunciation: [swə́n tʰjɛ̌n tʰjɛ̌n]; born 12 October 1981) is a Chinese tennis player. She won the gold medal at the 2004 Summer Olympics in women's doubles along with her partner Li Ting.

Sun reached a career-high singles ranking of world No. 77 in March 2007, winning her only WTA Tour singles title at the 2006 Tashkent Open, and a career-high in doubles of No. 16 in October 2007, winning eleven WTA Tour titles and reaching the quarterfinals of three Grand Slam tournaments, and winning the mixed doubles event at the 2008 Australian Open alongside Nenad Zimonjić.

== Career ==
In September 2000, Sun won two successive $10k singles titles, a feat she would repeat in June 2001 with another pair of back-to-back $10k singles titles [source: [WTA Official Website](https://www.wtatennis.com/)].

In 2002, Sun continued her success at the next level, winning two $25k tournaments: firstly in April at Ho Chi Minh City, Vietnam, where she defeated Zheng Jie in the semifinal and Jeon Mi-ra in the final [source: [WTA Official Website](https://www.wtatennis.com/)], and then in August at Beijing, overcoming Zheng Jie again in the semifinal and Rika Fujiwara in the final [source: [WTA Official Website](https://www.wtatennis.com/)].

In 2003, she reached the final of a $50k tournament in Modena, entering as a lucky loser and defeating several high-quality opponents such as Martina Suchá, Maret Ani, and Gala León García before losing to Melinda Czink in the final [source: [Tennis Abstract](https://www.tennisabstract.com/)].

That year, Sun also made notable appearances in several WTA tournaments. She qualified for Doha, defeating Yuliana Fedak, Ľubomíra Kurhajcová, and María Sánchez Lorenzo, but lost in three sets to Nicole Pratt in the opening round [source: [WTA Official Website](https://www.wtatennis.com/)]. At the US Open, after a victory over Selima Sfar, she was defeated by Saori Obata in the first round [source: [US Open Official Site](https://www.usopen.org/)]. By the end of 2003, she was ranked world No. 141 [source: [WTA Official Website](https://www.wtatennis.com/)].

In 2004, Sun qualified for several prominent tournaments, including the Australian Open, where she won against Roberta Vinci [source: [Australian Open Official Site](https://ausopen.com/)], and again at Doha. She secured significant victories in Miami and Amelia Island, and at Wimbledon, she won her first-round match against Tathiana Garbin before losing to Anne Kremer [source: [Wimbledon Official Site](https://www.wimbledon.com/)]. At the end of the year, she lost a tight three-set final in the first $50k Shenzhen tournament to Li Na and ended the year ranked No. 118 [source: [WTA Official Website](https://www.wtatennis.com/)].

Sun also competed in the 2004 Summer Olympics, where she won a gold medal in women's doubles with her partner Li Ting, defeating Conchita Martínez and Virginia Ruano Pascual of Spain in the final.

In 2005, Sun achieved her first WTA Tour singles quarterfinal at Hyderabad, where she defeated Tamarine Tanasugarn 6–2, 6–1 but lost to Anna-Lena Grönefeld [source: [WTA Official Website](https://www.wtatennis.com/)]. She also performed well at Los Angeles and the US Open, where she qualified with wins over Marlene Weingärtner and Ľudmila Cervanová, and defeated Samantha Stosur before losing to Anabel Medina Garrigues [source: [US Open Official Site](https://www.usopen.org/)]. Her career-best win came at Beijing, where she defeated Serena Williams in the second round before losing to Maria Kirilenko [source: [WTA Official Website](https://www.wtatennis.com/)]. This performance propelled her to a career-high ranking of No. 88 [source: [WTA Official Website](https://www.wtatennis.com/)], although she ended the year at No. 105 [source: [WTA Official Website](https://www.wtatennis.com/)].

In early 2006, Sun faced tough draws, including close losses to Amélie Mauresmo at the Australian Open and Nuria Llagostera Vives at Gold Coast [source: [Australian Open Official Site](https://ausopen.com/)]. At the Tashkent Open, she won her first WTA Tour title by defeating Iroda Tulyaganova in the final [source: [WTA Official Website](https://www.wtatennis.com/)] and reached a career-high ranking of No. 81 on 9 October 2006 [source: [WTA Official Website](https://www.wtatennis.com/)].

On 27 January 2008, Sun captured her first Grand Slam title in mixed doubles at the Australian Open, partnering with Nenad Zimonjić to defeat Sania Mirza and Mahesh Bhupathi in straight sets.

== Grand Slam tournament finals ==
=== Mixed doubles: 1 (title) ===
| Result | Year | Championship | Surface | Partner | Opponents | Score |
|---|---|---|---|---|---|---|
| Win | 2008 | Australian Open | Hard | (Serbia) Nenad Zimonjić | (India) Sania Mirza (India) Mahesh Bhupathi | 7–6^{(4)}, 6–4 |

== Other significant finals ==
=== Olympic Games ===
==== Doubles: 1 (gold medal) ====
| Result | Year | Championship | Surface | Partner | Opponents | Score |
|---|---|---|---|---|---|---|
| Gold | 2004 | Athens | Hard | (China) Li Ting | (Spain) Conchita Martínez (Spain) Virginia Ruano | 6–3, 6–3 |

== WTA Tour finals ==
=== Singles: 1 (title) ===
Legend
Tier I (0–0)
Tier II (0–0)
Tier III (0–0)
Tier IV & V (1–0)

| Result | Date | Tournament | Surface | Opponent | Score |
|---|---|---|---|---|---|
| Win | 8 October 2006 | Tashkent Open | Hard | (Uzbekistan) Iroda Tulyaganova | 6–2, 6–4 |

=== Doubles: 21 (11 titles, 10 runner-ups) ===
| Legend: Before 2009 | Legend: Starting in 2009 |
|---|---|
| Tier I (0–1) | Premier Mandatory |
| Tier II (1–1) | Premier 5 |
| Tier III (6–4) | Premier |
| Tier IV & V (4–3) | International (0–1) |

| Result | No. | Date | Tournament | Surface | Partner | Opponents | Score |
|---|---|---|---|---|---|---|---|
| Win | 1. | 14 June 2003 | Austrian Open | Clay | (China) Li Ting | (China) Yan Zi (China) Zheng Jie | 6–3, 6–4 |
| Loss | 1. | 12 October 2003 | Tashkent Open | Hard | (China) Li Ting | (Ukraine) Yuliya Beygelzimer (Belarus) Tatiana Poutchek | 3–6, 6–7^{(0)} |
| Win | 2. | 2 November 2003 | Tournoi de Québec | Hard(i) | (China) Li Ting | (Belgium) Els Callens (United States) Meilen Tu | 6–3, 6–3 |
| Win | 3. | 9 November 2003 | Pattaya Open | Hard | (China) Li Ting | (Indonesia) Wynne Prakusya (Indonesia) Angelique Widjaja | 6–4, 6–3 |
| Loss | 2. | 22 February 2004 | Bangalore Open | Hard | (China) Li Ting | (South Africa) Liezel Huber (India) Sania Mirza | 6–7^{(1)}, 4–6 |
| Win | 4. | 3 October 2004 | Guangzhou Open | Hard | (China) Li Ting | (China) Yang Shujing (China) Yu Ying | 6–4, 6–1 |
| Loss | 3. | 12 February 2005 | Bangalore Open | Hard | (China) Li Ting | (China) Yan Zi (China) Zheng Jie | 4–6, 1–6 |
| Win | 5. | 1 May 2005 | Estoril Open | Clay | (China) Li Ting | (Netherlands) Michaëlla Krajicek (Slovakia) Henrieta Nagyová | 6–3, 6–1 |
| Win | 6. | 12 February 2006 | Pattaya Open | Hard | (China) Li Ting | (China) Yan Zi (China) Zheng Jie | 3–6, 6–1, 7–6^{(5)} |
| Loss | 4. | 4 March 2006 | Qatar Open | Hard | (China) Li Ting | (Slovakia) Daniela Hantuchová (Japan) Ai Sugiyama | 4–6, 4–6 |
| Win | 7. | 7 May 2006 | Estoril Open | Clay | (China) Li Ting | (Argentina) Gisela Dulko (Spain) María Sánchez Lorenzo | 6–2, 6–2 |
| Win | 8. | 1 October 2006 | Guangzhou Open | Hard | (China) Li Ting | (United States) Vania King (Croatia) Jelena Kostanić Tošić | 6–4, 2–6, 7–5 |
| Loss | 5. | 15 April 2007 | Charleston Open | Hard | (China) Peng Shuai | (China) Yan Zi (China) Zheng Jie | 5–7, 0–6 |
| Loss | 6. | 26 May 2007 | Internationaux de Strasbourg | Clay | (Australia) Alicia Molik | (China) Zheng Jie (China) Yan Zi | 3–6, 4–6 |
| Loss | 7. | 17 June 2007 | Birmingham Classic | Grass | (United States) Meilen Tu | (Chinese Taipei) Chuang Chia-jung (Chinese Taipei) Chan Yung-jan | 6–7^{(3)}, 3–6 |
| Loss | 8. | 19 October 2007 | Guangzhou Open | Hard | (United States) Vania King | (China) Peng Shuai (China) Yan Zi | 6–3, 6–4 |
| Win | 9. | 7 October 2007 | Japan Open | Hard | (China) Yan Zi | (Chinese Taipei) Chuang Chia-jung (United States) Vania King | 1–6, 6–2, [10–6] |
| Win | 10. | 14 October 2007 | Bangkok Open | Hard | (China) Yan Zi | (Japan) Ayumi Morita (Japan) Junri Namigata | w/o |
| Win | 11. | 9 March 2008 | Bangalore Open | Hard | (China) Peng Shuai | (Chinese Taipei) Chan Yung-jan (Chinese Taipei) Chuang Chia-jung | 6–4, 5–7, [10–8] |
| Loss | 9. | 21 September 2008 | Guangzhou Open | Hard | (China) Yan Zi | (Ukraine) Mariya Koryttseva (Belarus) Tatiana Poutchek | 4–6, 6–4, [8–10] |
| Loss | 10. | 20 September 2009 | Guangzhou Open | Hard | (Japan) Kimiko Date-Krumm | (Belarus) Olga Govortsova (Belarus) Tatiana Poutchek | 6–3, 2–6, [8–10] |

== ITF Circuit finals ==
=== Singles: 11 (6–5) ===
$50,000 tournaments
$25,000 tournaments
$10,000 tournaments

| Result | No. | Date | Tournament | Surface | Opponent | Score |
|---|---|---|---|---|---|---|
| Loss | 1. | 16 April 2000 | ITF Shenyang, China | Hard | (China) Li Na | 0–6, 4–6 |
| Loss | 2. | 4 June 2000 | ITF Shenzhen, China | Hard | (South Korea) Kim Eun-ha | 4–6, 3–6 |
| Win | 3. | 4 September 2000 | ITF Hangzhou, China | Hard | (China) Zheng Jie | 6–2, 6–2 |
| Win | 4. | 17 September 2000 | ITF Hohhot, China | Hard | (China) Ding Ding | 6–4, 6–3 |
| Win | 5. | 17 June 2001 | ITF Seoul, South Korea | Hard | (South Korea) Choi Jin-young | 3–6, 6–3, 6–1 |
| Win | 6. | 24 June 2001 | ITF Inchon, South Korea | Hard | (South Korea) Chung Yang-jin | 6–4, 6–3 |
| Win | 7. | 14 April 2002 | ITF Ho Chi Minh City, Vietnam | Hard | (South Korea) Jeon Mi-ra | 6–3, 6–4 |
| Loss | 8. | 13 May 2002 | ITF Shanghai, China | Hard | (China) Zheng Jie | 2–6, 2–6 |
| Win | 9. | 6 August 2002 | ITF Beijing, China | Hard | (Japan) Rika Fujiwara | 6–3, 6–0 |
| Loss | 10. | 20 July 2003 | ITF Modena, Italy | Clay | (Hungary) Melinda Czink | 3–6, 3–6 |
| Loss | 11. | 31 October 2004 | ITF Shenzhen, China | Hard | (China) Li Na | 3–6, 6–4, 2–6 |

=== Doubles: 21 (13–8) ===
| Result | No. | Date | Tournament | Surface | Partnering | Opponents | Score |
|---|---|---|---|---|---|---|---|
| Win | 1. | 13 June 1999 | ITF Shenyang, China | Hard | (China) Chen Yan | (China) Chen Yin (China) Tuo Qi | 6–2, 6–4 |
| Win | 2. | 10 September 2000 | ITF Zhejiang, China | Hard | (China) Chen Yan | (China) Zheng Jie (China) Yan Zi | 6–3, 7–5 |
| Win | 3. | 10 September 2000 | ITF Hohhot, China | Clay | (China) Chen Yan | (China) Ding Ding (China) Tang Yan | 6–0, 6–3 |
| Loss | 4. | 4 June 2001 | ITF Hohhot, China | Hard | (China) Chen Yan | (China) Zheng Jie (China) Yan Zi | 4–6, 6–2, 3–6 |
| Loss | 5. | 29 July 2001 | ITF Guangzhou, China | Hard | (China) Chen Yan | (China) Li Ting (Hong Kong) Tong Ka-po | 5–7, 3–6 |
| Win | 6. | 27 January 2002 | ITF Hull, United Kingdom | Hard (i) | (China) Zheng Jie | (Republic of Ireland) Claire Curran (Republic of Ireland) Elsa O'Riain | 7–6^{(4)}, 7–5 |
| Loss | 7. | 10 February 2002 | ITF Redbridge, United Kingdom | Hard (i) | (United Kingdom) Helen Crook | (Romania) Magda Mihalache (Russia) Ekaterina Sysoeva | 6–4, 4–6, 4–6 |
| Win | 8. | 11 August 2002 | ITF Beijing, China | Hard | (China) Li Ting | (China) Yan Zi (China) Zheng Jie | 7–5, 6–3 |
| Win | 9. | 23 February 2003 | ITF Columbus, United States | Hard (i) | (China) Li Ting | (Brazil) Bruna Colósio (Brazil) Joana Cortez | 6–3, 6–1 |
| Win | 10. | 2 March 2003 | ITF Saint Paul, United States | Hard | (China) Li Ting | (United States) Teryn Ashley (United States) Abigail Spears | 6–3, 6–1 |
| Win | 11. | 30 March 2003 | ITF Atlanta, United States | Hard | (China) Li Ting | (New Zealand) Leanne Baker (Italy) Francesca Lubiani | 4–6, 6–4, 6–4 |
| Loss | 12. | 16 June 2003 | ITF Gorizia, Italy | Clay | (China) Li Ting | (China) Yan Zi (China) Zheng Jie | 6–7^{(5)}, 6–1, 4–6 |
| Win | 13. | 23 June 2003 | ITF Fontanafredda, Italy | Clay | (China) Li Ting | (Bulgaria) Maria Geznenge (Serbia and Montenegro) Dragana Zarić | 6–4, 6–3 |
| Loss | 14. | 30 June 2003 | ITF Orbetello, Italy | Clay | (China) Li Ting | (China) Yan Zi (China) Zheng Jie | 2–6, 5–7 |
| Win | 15. | 13 July 2003 | ITF Modena, Italy | Clay | (China) Li Ting | (Japan) Rika Fujiwara (Australia) Trudi Musgrave | 3–6, 7–5, 7–5 |
| Win | 16. | 30 November 2003 | ITF Changsha, China | Hard | (China) Li Ting | (China) Yan Zi (China) Zheng Jie | 6–4, 6–2 |
| Win | 17. | 7 December 2003 | ITF Shenzhen, China | Hard | (China) Li Ting | (China) Yan Zi (China) Zheng Jie | 6–3, 3–6, 6–4 |
| Loss | 18. | 6 June 2005 | ITF Beijing, China | Hard | (China) Li Ting | (China) Yan Zi (China) Zheng Jie | 1–6, 5–7 |
| Win | 19. | 16 August 2005 | Bronx Classic, United States | Hard | (China) Li Ting | (Belarus) Tatiana Poutchek (Belarus) Anastasiya Yakimova | 2–6, 6–2, 6–4 |
| Loss | 20. | 17 May 2009 | Open de Saint-Gaudens, France | Clay | (Japan) Kimiko Date | (Japan) Rika Fujiwara (South Africa) Chanelle Scheepers | 5–7, 4–6 |
| Loss | 21. | 10 August 2009 | ITF Quanzhou, China | Hard | (China) Hao Jie | (China) Han Xinyun (Chinese Taipei) Kao Shao-yuan | 6–1, 2–6, [6–10] |

== See also ==
- Tennis in China
