= 1996 Challenge Bell – Singles =

Singles
- 1996 Challenge Bell

Final
- Champion: (United States) Lisa Raymond
- Runner-up: (Belgium) Els Callens
- Score: 6–4, 6–4

Details
- Draw: 32
- Seeds: 8

Events
Singles	Doubles
← 1995 ·	Tournoi de Québec	· 1997 →

Brenda Schultz-McCarthy was the defending champion, but lost in the quarterfinals to Lisa Raymond.

Raymond went on to win her maiden WTA singles title, defeating Els Callens 6–4, 6–4 in the final.

== Seeds ==
1. (Netherlands) Brenda Schultz-McCarthy (quarterfinals)
2. (Russia) Elena Likhovtseva (semifinals)
3. (United States) Amy Frazier (second round)
4. (United States) Kimberly Po (quarterfinals)
5. (United States) Lisa Raymond (champion)
6. (Argentina) Florencia Labat (quarterfinals)
7. (Japan) Nana Miyagi (first round)
8. (United States) Lindsay Lee (first round)

== Draw ==
=== Key ===
- Q = Qualifier
- WC = Wild card
- LL = Lucky loser
- Alt = Alternate
- SE = Special exempt
- PR = Protected ranking
- ITF = ITF entry
- JE = Junior exempt
- w/o = Walkover
- r = Retired
- d = Defaulted
- SR = Special ranking

=== Finals ===
Semifinals
5	(United States) Lisa Raymond	6	6
(United States) Tami Whitlinger-Jones	3	4
(Belgium) Els Callens	6	6
2	(Russia) Elena Likhovtseva	0	4

Final
5	(United States) Lisa Raymond	6	6
(Belgium) Els Callens	4	4

=== Top half ===
First round
1	(Netherlands) B Schultz-McCarthy	7	6
(Belgium) S Devillé	6	2
(United States) N Arendt	6	6	6
(Canada) R Simpson	0	7	4
LL	(Canada) M Drake	3	2
Q	(United States) D Graham	6	6
(Germany) A Glass	3	4
5	(United States) L Raymond	6	6
4	(United States) K Po	6	6
(United States) C Morariu	2	0
(Argentina) P Suárez	0	6
(United States) A Miller	6	7
(United States) T W-Jones	6	6
(Slovenia) T Križan	4	4
Q	(Canada) J Nejedly	6	6
8	(United States) L Lee	2	3

Second round
1	(Netherlands) B Schultz-McCarthy	6	3	6
(United States) N Arendt	4	6	4
Q	(United States) D Graham	5	2
5	(United States) L Raymond	7	6
4	(United States) K Po	6	3	6
(United States) A Miller	2	6	0
(United States) T W-Jones	3	7	6
Q	(Canada) J Nejedly	6	6	4

Quarterfinals
1	(Netherlands) B Schultz-McCarthy	0	6
5	(United States) L Raymond	6	7
4	(United States) K Po	6	4	5
(United States) T W-Jones	1	6	7

Semifinals
5	(United States) L Raymond	6	6
(United States) T W-Jones	3	4

=== Bottom half ===
First round
6	(Argentina) F Labat	4	6	6
Q	(United States) A Lettiere	6	1	4
WC	(Canada) C Popescu	4	6	3
(Canada) P Hy-Boulais	6	4	6
(Belgium) N Feber	3	4
(Belgium) E Callens	6	6
(Spain) V Ruano-Pascual	3	2
3	(United States) A Frazier	6	6
7	(Japan) N Miyagi	6	1	4
(United States) J Watanabe	4	6	6
Q	(Japan) H Inoue	6	6
WC	(Canada) S Jeyaseelan	4	2
(United States) K Adams	7	6
LL	(United States) J Ingram	6	3
(Australia) R Stubbs	3	5
2	(Russia) E Likhovtseva	6	7

Second round
6	(Argentina) F Labat	7	6
(Canada) P Hy-Boulais	5	3
(Belgium) E Callens	3	6	6
3	(United States) A Frazier	6	2	4
(United States) J Watanabe	6	6
Q	(Japan) H Inoue	3	1
(United States) K Adams	2	7	2
2	(Russia) E Likhovtseva	6	5	6

Quarterfinals
6	(Argentina) F Labat	4	4
(Belgium) E Callens	6	6
(United States) J Watanabe	6	6
2	(Russia) E Likhovtseva	7	7

Semifinals
(Belgium) E Callens	6	6
2	(Russia) E Likhovtseva	0	4
