= Tennis at the 1999 Pan American Games – Women's singles =

Women's singles at the 1999 Pan American Games was won by María Vento-Kabchi of Venezuela.

== Medalists ==
Gold	(Venezuela) María Vento-Kabchi
Silver	(United States) Tara Snyder
Bronze	(Argentina) Mariana Díaz Oliva
Bronze	(United States) Alexandra Stevenson

== Draw ==
=== Final rounds ===
Quarterfinals
(Venezuela) María Vento-Kabchi	6	6
(United States) Lilia Osterloh	4	0
(United States) Alexandra Stevenson	7	4	7
(Canada) Renata Kolbovic	6	6	4
(United States) Tara Snyder	6	7
(Venezuela) Milagros Sequera	2	6
(Brazil) Vanessa Menga	4	3
(Argentina) Mariana Díaz Oliva	6	6

Semifinals
(Venezuela) María Vento-Kabchi	6	6
(United States) Alexandra Stevenson	0	3
(United States) Tara Snyder	6	6
(Argentina) Mariana Díaz Oliva	2	2

Final
(Venezuela) María Vento-Kabchi	7	7
(United States) Tara Snyder	6	1
