= 1998 Challenge Bell =

Tennis tournament

- Date: October 26 – November 1
- Edition: 6th
- Category: WTA Tier III
- Draw: 30S (25Q) / 16D (3Q)
- Prize money: US$164,250
- Surface: Carpet – indoors
- Location: Quebec City, Canada
- Venue: Club Avantage Multi-Sports

Champions

Singles
- (United States) Tara Snyder

Doubles
- (United States) Lori McNeil / (United States) Kimberly Po
← 1997 ·	Tournoi de Québec	· 1999 →

The 1997 Challenge Bell was a women's tennis tournament played on indoor carpet courts at the Club Avantage Multi-Sports in Quebec City in Canada that was part of Tier III of the 1998 WTA Tour. It was the 6th edition of the Challenge Bell, and was held from October 26 through November 1, 1998. Seventh-seeded Tara Snyder won the singles title.

== Finals ==
=== Singles ===
(United States) Tara Snyder defeated (United States) Chanda Rubin, 4–6, 6–4, 7–6

- It was Snyder's only title of the year and the 1st of her career.

=== Doubles ===
(United States) Lori McNeil / (United States) Kimberly Po defeated (United States) Chanda Rubin / (France) Sandrine Testud, 6–7, 7–5, 6–4

- It was McNeil's only title of the year and the 41st of her career. It was Po's only title of the year and the 1st of her career.
