= 2000 Challenge Bell =

- Date: October 30 – November 5
- Edition: 8th
- Category: WTA Tier III
- Draw: 30S (30Q) / 16D (4Q)
- Prize money: US$170,000
- Surface: Hard – indoors
- Location: Quebec City, Canada
- Venue: Club Avantage Multi-Sports

Champions

Singles
- (United States) Chanda Rubin

Doubles
- (Australia) Nicole Pratt / (United States) Meghann Shaughnessy
← 1999 ·	Tournoi de Québec	· 2001 →

The 2000 Challenge Bell was a women's tennis tournament played on indoor hard courts at the Club Avantage Multi-Sports in Quebec City in Canada that was part of Tier III of the 2000 WTA Tour. It was the 8th edition of the Challenge Bell, and was held from October 30 through November 5, 2000. Second-seeded Chanda Rubin won the singles title.

== Finals ==
=== Singles ===
(United States) Chanda Rubin defeated (United States) Jennifer Capriati, 6–4, 6–2

- It was Rubin's only title of the year and the 3rd of her career.

=== Doubles ===
(Australia) Nicole Pratt / (United States) Meghann Shaughnessy defeated (Belgium) Els Callens / (United States) Kimberly Po, 6–3, 6–4

- It was Graham's 2nd title of the year and the 2nd of her career. It was Shaughnessy's only title of the year and the 1st of her career.
