= Maria Elena Camerin =

Italian tennis player

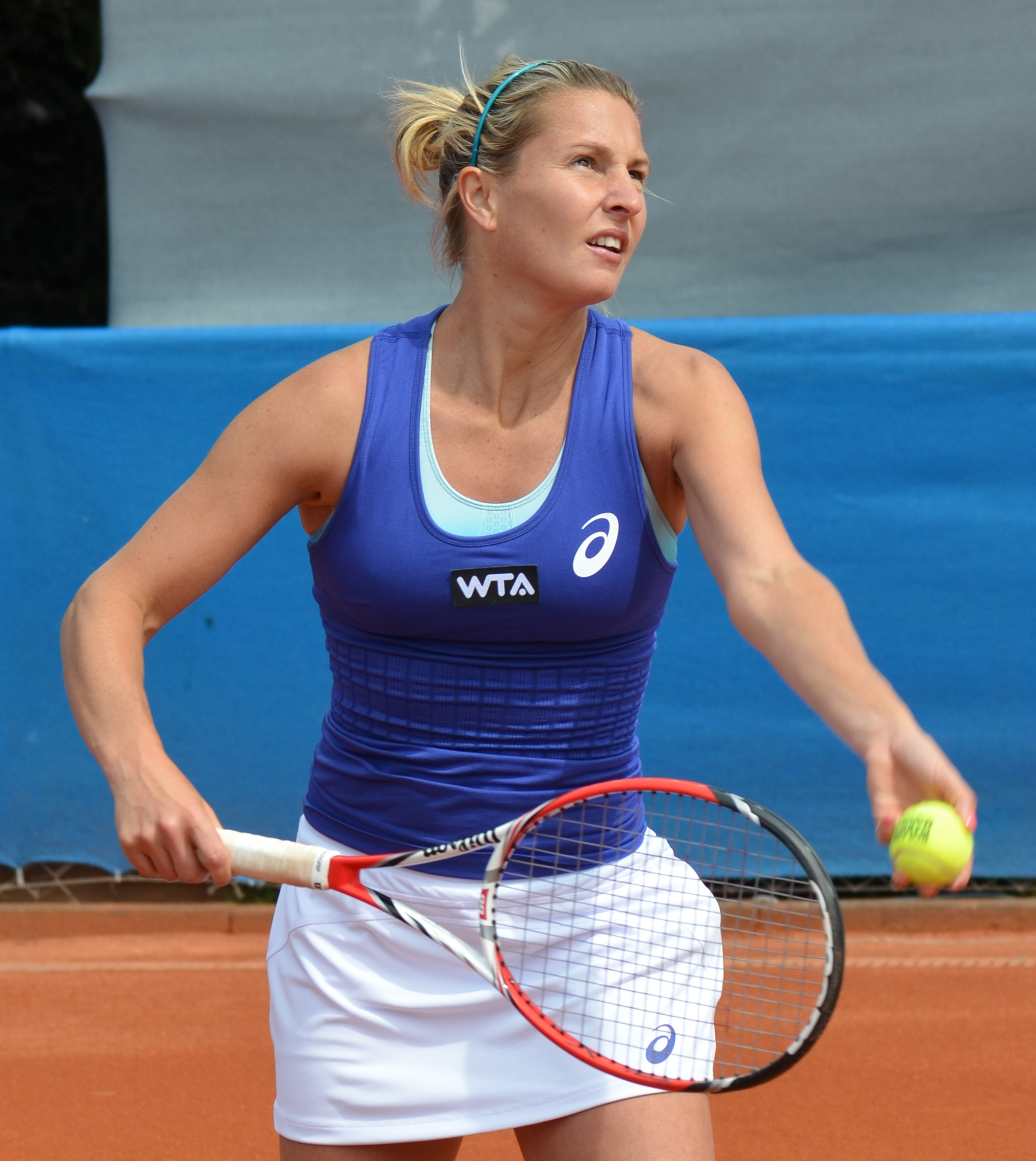
- Nürnberger Versicherungscup, 2014
- Country (sports): Italy
- Residence: Brescia
- Born: 21 March 1982 (age 44) Motta di Livenza, Italy
- Height: 1.64 m (5 ft 5 in)
- Turned pro: 1997
- Retired: 2018 (last match played)
- Plays: Right-handed (two-handed backhand)
- Prize money: $1,721,517

Singles
- Career record: 445–408
- Career titles: 10 ITF
- Highest ranking: No. 41 (11 October 2004)

Grand Slam singles results
- Australian Open: 3R (2006, 2007)
- French Open: 2R (2004)
- Wimbledon: 2R (2003, 2004)
- US Open: 2R (2003, 2004, 2005, 2007, 2008, 2010)

Doubles
- Career record: 210–195
- Career titles: 3 WTA, 9 ITF
- Highest ranking: No. 33 (31 July 2006)

Grand Slam doubles results
- Australian Open: 3R (2007)
- French Open: QF (2007)
- Wimbledon: 3R (2006)
- US Open: 3R (2007)

Maria Elena Camerin (born 21 March 1982) is a former professional tennis player from Italy. In her career, Camerin won three doubles titles on the WTA Tour, including a WTA 1000 at Cincinnati Open, as well as ten singles and nine doubles titles on the ITF Circuit. On 11 October 2004, she reached her best singles ranking of world No. 41. On 31 July 2006, she peaked at No. 33 in the doubles rankings. In a major her greatest success where quarterfinals in doubles at the 2007 French Open.

Playing for Italy Fed Cup team, Camerin has a win–loss record of 1–5.

== Career ==
In July 2001, Camerin had her first WTA Tour singles runner-up in Casablanca where she lost the final against Zsófia Gubacsi.

In July 2006, she won her biggest doubles title at the Cincinnati Open, partnering Gisela Dulko. In September, in Portorož at the Slovenia Open, she lost the final against Tamira Paszek in straight sets.

Camerin withdrew from the 2006 Tashkent Open doubles final due to injury.

In 2012, she defeated Garbiñe Muguruza in the second qualifying round of the Wimbledon Championships.

== Significant finals ==
=== Premier Mandatory/Premier-5 tournaments ===
==== Doubles: 1 (title) ====
Result	Year	Tournament	Surface	Partner	Opponents	Score
Win	2006	Cincinnati Open	Hard	(Argentina) Gisela Dulko	(Poland) Marta Domachowska (India) Sania Mirza	6–4, 3–6, 6–2

== WTA Tour finals ==
=== Singles: 2 (2 runner-ups) ===
Legend Premier International (0–2)	Finals by surface Hard (0–1) Clay (0–1)

Result	No.	Date	Tournament	Surface	Opponent	Score
Loss	1.	Jul 2001	Morocco Open	Clay	(Hungary) Zsófia Gubacsi	6–1, 3–6, 6–7^{(5–7)}
Loss	2.	Sep 2006	Slovenia Open	Hard	(Austria) Tamira Paszek	5–7, 1–6

=== Doubles: 6 (3 titles, 3 runner-ups) ===
Legend Premier M & Premier 5 (1–0) Premier (1–1) International (1–2)	Finals by surface Hard (3–3)

Result	No.	Date	Tournament	Surface	Partner	Opponents	Score
Loss	1.	Jan 2005	Gold Coast Hardcourts, Australia	Hard	(Italy) Silvia Farina Elia	(Russia) Elena Likhovtseva (Bulgaria) Magdalena Maleeva	6–3, 5–7, 6–1
Win	1.	Sep 2005	Guangzhou Open, China	Hard	(Switzerland) Emmanuelle Gagliardi	(United States) Neha Uberoi (India) Shikha Uberoi	7–6^{(7–5)}, 6–3
Win	2.	Oct 2005	Tashkent Open, Uzbekistan	Hard	(France) Émilie Loit	(Russia) Anastasia Rodionova (Russia) Galina Voskoboeva	6–3, 6–0
Win	3.	Jul 2006	Cincinnati Open, United States	Hard	(Argentina) Gisela Dulko	(Poland) Marta Domachowska (India) Sania Mirza	6–4, 3–6, 6–2
Loss	2.	Jul 2006	Stanford Classic, United States	Hard	(Argentina) Gisela Dulko	(Germany) Anna-Lena Grönefeld (Israel) Shahar Pe'er	6–1, 6–4
Loss	3.	Oct 2006	Tashkent Open, Uzbekistan	Hard	(Switzerland) Emmanuelle Gagliardi	(Belarus) Tatiana Poutchek (Belarus) Victoria Azarenka	w/o

== ITF Circuit finals ==
Legend
$100,000 tournaments
$75,000 tournaments
$50,000 tournaments
$25,000 tournaments
$10,000 tournaments

=== Singles: 18 (10–8) ===
Result	No.	Date	Tournament	Surface	Opponent	Score
Win	1.	28 August 2000	ITF Spoleto, Italy	Clay	(Estonia) Maret Ani	6–2, 7–6
Loss	1.	17 September 2000	ITF Reggio Emilia, Italy	Clay	(Italy) Antonella Serra Zanetti	4–6, 4–6
Win	2.	9 April 2001	ITF San Luis Potosí, Mexico	Clay	(Germany) Martina Müller	6–4, 7–5
Win	3.	16 April 2001	ITF Coatzacoalcos, Mexico	Hard	(Slovakia) Gabriela Voleková	6–1, 6–3
Loss	2.	29 April 2001	ITF Sarasota, United States	Clay	(Spain) Virginia Ruano Pascual	0–6, 3–6
Loss	3.	10 June 2001	ITF Galatina, Italy	Clay	(Czech Republic) Jana Hlaváčková	6–1, 3–6, 2–6
Win	4.	15 October 2002	ITF Sedona, United States	Hard	(United States) Brie Rippner	6–3, 4–6, 6–3
Win	5.	5 November 2002	ITF Pittsburgh, United States	Hard	(Russia) Maria Sharapova	7–6, 6–2
Loss	4.	7 April 2003	ITF Coatzacoalcos, Mexico	Clay	(Canada) Vanessa Webb	3–6, 7–6, 6–7
Win	6.	14 April 2003	ITF San Luis Potosí, Mexico	Clay	(Argentina) Vanina García Sokol	6–0, 6–4
Loss	5.	11 May 2003	Fukuoka International, Japan	Grass	(Japan) Saori Obata	6–2, 3–6, 3–6
Loss	6.	5 October 2003	Classic of Troy, United States	Hard	(Puerto Rico) Kristina Brandi	6–7, 3–6
Win	7.	27 April 2009	Open de Cagnes-sur-Mer, France	Clay	(Czech Republic) Zuzana Ondrášková	6–1, 6–2
Win	8.	1 June 2009	Nottingham Trophy, United Kingdom	Grass	(Switzerland) Stefanie Vögele	6–2, 4–6, 6–1
Win	9.	28 May 2012	Grado Tennis Cup, Italy	Clay	(Austria) Yvonne Meusburger	6–2, 6–3
Win	10.	27 August 2012	ITF Bagnatica, Italy	Clay	(Italy) Karin Knapp	7–6, 6–4
Loss	7.	23 September 2012	Royal Cup, Montenegro	Clay	(Czech Republic) Renata Voráčová	6–3, 2–6, 0–6
Loss	8.	11 November 2013	Dubai Tennis Challenge, UAE	Hard	(Slovakia) Jana Čepelová	1–6, 2–6

=== Doubles: 17 (9–8) ===
Result	No.	Date	Tournament	Surface	Partner	Opponents	Score
Loss	1.	21 March 1999	ITF Val Gardena, Italy	Hard (i)	(France) Catherine Tanvier	(United States) Dawn Buth (United States) Rebecca Jensen	2–6, 6–3, 6–7
Win	2.	27 February 2000	ITF Vilamoura, Portugal	Clay	(Austria) Barbara Hellwig	(Portugal) Ana Catarina Nogueira (United Kingdom) Nicola Payne	6–2, 6–0
Loss	3.	30 April 2000	ITF Cerignola, Italy	Clay	(Italy) Mara Santangelo	(Russia) Maria Boboedova (Armenia) Liudmila Nikoyan	w/o
Win	4.	20 August 2000	ITF Aosta, Italy	Clay	(Italy) Mara Santangelo	(Romania) Oana-Elena Golimbioschi (Romania) Andreea Ehritt-Vanc	7–5, 4–6, 6–1
Win	5.	27 August 2000	ITF Cuneo, Italy	Clay	(Italy) Mara Santangelo	(Italy) Silvia Disderi (Italy) Anna Floris	7–5, 6–2
Win	6.	3 September 2000	ITF Spoleto, Italy	Clay	(Italy) Mara Santangelo	(Romania) Oana-Elena Golimbioschi (Romania) Andreea Ehritt-Vanc	w/o
Win	7.	1 October 2000	ITF Verona, Italy	Clay	(Romania) Andreea Ehritt-Vanc	(Argentina) Eugenia Chialvo (Spain) Lourdes Dominguez Lino	7–6, 6–2
Loss	8.	7 October 2001	ITF Girona, Spain	Clay	(Spain) Nuria Llagostera Vives	(Spain) Eva Bes (Spain) Lourdes Dominguez Lino	2–6, 6–4, 1–6
Loss	9.	1 March 2009	ITF Clearwater, United States	Hard	(Belgium) Yanina Wickmayer	(Czech Republic) Lucie Hradecká (Czech Republic) Michaela Paštiková	w/o
Win	10.	23 March 2009	ITF Jersey, United Kingdom	Carpet	(France) Stéphanie Foretz	(France) Youlia Fedossova (France) Violette Huck	6–4, 6–2
Loss	11.	24 July 2011	Open Romania Ladies	Hard	(Turkey) İpek Şenoğlu	(Romania) Irina-Camelia Begu (Romania) Elena Bogdan	7–6, 6–7, 6–4
Loss	12.	5 March 2012	ITF Irapuato, Mexico	Hard	(Ukraine) Mariya Koryttseva	(Hungary) Katalin Marosi (Slovakia) Janette Husárová	2–6, 7–6, [7–10]
Loss	13.	12 March 2012	ITF Poza Rica, Mexico	Hard	(Ukraine) Mariya Koryttseva	(Slovakia) Jana Čepelová (Slovakia) Lenka Wienerová	5–7, 6–2, [3–10]
Win	14.	26 November 2012	Dubai Tennis Challenge, UAE	Hard	(Russia) Vera Dushevina	(Czech Republic) Karolína Plíšková (Czech Republic) Eva Hrdinová	7–5, 6–3
Win	15.	23 September 2013	Telavi Open, Georgia	Clay	(Slovenia) Anja Prislan	(Germany) Anna Zaja (Slovenia) Maša Zec Peškirič	7–5, 6–2
Win	16.	9 November 2013	ITF Istanbul, Turkey	Hard (i)	(Uzbekistan) Nigina Abduraimova	(Slovenia) Tadeja Majerič (Romania) Andreea Mitu	6–3, 2–6, [10–8]
Loss	17.	13 October 2014	Open de Touraine, France	Hard (i)	(Italy) Alberta Brianti	(France) Stéphanie Foretz (France) Amandine Hesse	def.

== Grand Slam performance timelines ==
Key
W	F	SF	QF	#R	RR	Q#	DNQ	A	NH

(W) winner; (F) finalist; (SF) semifinalist; (QF) quarterfinalist; (#R) rounds 4, 3, 2, 1; (RR) round-robin stage; (Q#) qualification round; (DNQ) did not qualify; (A) absent; (NH) not held; (SR) strike rate (events won / competed); (W–L) win–loss record.

=== Singles ===
Tournament	1997	1998	1999	2000	2001	2002	2003	2004	2005	2006	2007	2008	2009	2010	2011	2012	2013	2014	W–L
Australian Open	A	A	A	A	LQ	2R	LQ	2R	1R	3R	3R	2R	1R	LQ	1R	Q2	Q2	Q1	7–8
French Open	A	A	A	A	LQ	1R	1R	2R	1R	1R	1R	1R	LQ	1R	Q2	Q2	Q1	A	1–8
Wimbledon	A	A	A	A	A	LQ	2R	2R	1R	1R	1R	1R	1R	1R	Q2	1R	1R	A	2–10
US Open	A	A	A	A	1R	LQ	2R	2R	2R	1R	2R	2R	1R	2R	Q1	Q1	Q1	A	6–9
Win–loss	0–0	0–0	0–0	0–0	0–1	1–2	2–3	4–4	1–4	2–4	3–4	2–4	0–3	1–3	0–1	0–1	0–1	0–0	16–35

=== Doubles ===
Tournament	2004	2005	2006	2007	2008	2009	W–L
Australian Open	A	1R	2R	3R	1R	A	3–4
French Open	2R	2R	1R	QF	1R	1R	5–6
Wimbledon	1R	1R	3R	1R	2R	2R	4–6
US Open	2R	2R	1R	3R	2R	1R	5–6
Win–loss	2–3	2–4	3–4	7–4	2–4	1–3	17–22

== Head-to-head record ==
Players who have been ranked world No. 1 are in boldface.

- Dinara Safina 1–4
- Sorana Cîrstea 0–2
- Anastasia Pavlyuchenkova 0–1
- Jelena Kostanić 0–4
- Flavia Pennetta 0–4
- Daniela Hantuchová 0–2
- Elena Dementieva 0–4
- Patty Schnyder 0–1
- **Victoria Azarenka** 0–1
- Francesca Schiavone 0–3
- Samantha Stosur 2–1
- **Maria Sharapova** 1–1
- Ai Sugiyama 0–1
- **Jelena Janković** 0–4
- Amélie Mauresmo 0–2
- Jelena Dokić 1–0
- Conchita Martínez 0–2
- Li Na 1–2
- **Kim Clijsters** 0–2
- **Caroline Wozniacki** 0–2
- Lindsay Davenport 0–2
- Anastasia Myskina 1–1
- **Justine Henin** 0–2
- **Serena Williams** 0–1
- Nadia Petrova 0–2
- Petra Kvitová 0–2
- Paola Suárez 0–2
- Alicia Molik 0–1
- Marion Bartoli 1–4
