= 1998 Challenge Bell – Singles =

Singles
- 1998 Challenge Bell

Final
- Champion: (United States) Tara Snyder
- Runner-up: (United States) Chanda Rubin
- Score: 4–6, 6–4, 7–6^{(8–6)}

Details
- Draw: 30
- Seeds: 8

Events
Singles	Doubles
- Tournoi de Québec

Brenda Schultz-McCarthy was the reigning champion, but decided not to participate this year.

Tara Snyder won her maiden WTA singles title, defeating Chanda Rubin 4–6, 6–4, 7–6^{(8–6)} in the final.

== Seeds ==
1. (Belgium) Dominique Van Roost (quarterfinals)
2. (France) Sandrine Testud (quarterfinals)
3. (France) Julie Halard-Decugis (first round)
4. (Venezuela) Maria Vento (second round)
5. (United States) Chanda Rubin (final)
6. (United States) Amy Frazier (first round)
7. (United States) Tara Snyder (champion)
8. (France) Nathalie Dechy (quarterfinals)

== Draw ==
Key

- Q = Qualifier
- WC = Wild card
- LL = Lucky loser
- Alt = Alternate
- ITF = ITF entry
- PR = Protected ranking
- SR = Special ranking
- SE = Special exempt
- JE = Junior exempt
- JR = Junior Accelerator Programme entrant
- CO = College Accelerator Programme entrant
- NG = Next Gen Accelerator Program entrant
- w/o = Walkover
- r = Retired
- d = Defaulted

=== Finals ===
Semifinals
5	(United States) Chanda Rubin	6	6
8	(France) Nathalie Dechy	2	4
7	(United States) Tara Snyder	1	6	7
(United States) Jane Chi	6	3	5

Final
5	(United States) Chanda Rubin	6	4	6
7	(United States) Tara Snyder	4	6	7

=== Top half ===
First round
(Germany) J Kandarr	3	3
(Canada) J Nejedly	6	6
LL	(United States) M Washington	7	6
(United States) M Shaughnessy	6	4
(Chinese Taipei) J Lee	4	1
5	(United States) C Rubin	6	6
3	(France) J Halard-Decugis	3	6
WC	(Canada) S Jeyaseelan	6	7
Q	(United States) E deLone	4	3
Q	(United States) A Stevenson	6	6
(Italy) L Golarsa	3	6
Q	(Belgium) E Callens	6	7
(Switzerland) E Gagliardi	7	2	1
8	(France) N Dechy	5	6	6

Second round
1	(Belgium) D Van Roost	7	6
(Canada) J Nejedly	6	1
LL	(United States) M Washington	6	6	4
5	(United States) C Rubin	4	7	6
WC	(Canada) S Jeyaseelan	3	4
Q	(United States) A Stevenson	6	6
Q	(Belgium) E Callens
8	(France) N Dechy	w/o

Quarterfinals
1	(Belgium) D Van Roost	2	2
5	(United States) C Rubin	6	6
Q	(United States) A Stevenson	2	6
8	(France) N Dechy	6	7

Semifinals
5	(United States) C Rubin	6	6
8	(France) N Dechy	2	4

=== Bottom half ===
First round
7	(United States) T Snyder	6	6
(Australia) N Pratt	4	2
(Germany) A Glass	6	0	2
(Germany) B Rittner	4	6	6
(United States) K Po	3	3
(Romania) C Cristea	6	6
(France) A Dechaume-Balleret	2	3
4	(Venezuela) M Vento	6	6
6	(United States) A Frazier	6	3	2
Q	(Czech Republic) D Chládková	4	6	6
(Czech Republic) A Gerši	1	5
(United States) J Chi	6	7
WC	(Canada) M-È Pelletier	1	3
(United States) J Capriati	6	6

Second round
7	(United States) T Snyder	6	6
(Germany) B Rittner	0	3
(Romania) C Cristea	6	3	6
4	(Venezuela) M Vento	0	6	3
Q	(Czech Republic) D Chládková	2	2
(United States) J Chi	6	6
(United States) J Capriati	3	7	6
2	(France) S Testud	6	5	7

Quarterfinals
7	(United States) T Snyder	6	6
(Romania) C Cristea	4	4
(United States) J Chi	6	7
2	(France) S Testud	4	5

Semifinals
7	(United States) T Snyder	1	6	7
(United States) J Chi	6	3	5
