= 1999 Challenge Bell =

- Date: November 1–7
- Edition: 7th
- Category: WTA Tier III
- Draw: 30S (32Q) / 16D (5Q)
- Prize money: US$180,000
- Surface: Carpet – indoors
- Location: Quebec City, Canada
- Venue: Club Avantage Multi-Sports

Champions

Singles
- (United States) Jennifer Capriati

Doubles
- (United States) Amy Frazier / (United States) Katie Schlukebir
← 1998 ·	Tournoi de Québec	· 2000 →

The 1999 Challenge Bell was a women's tennis tournament played on indoor carpet courts at the Club Avantage Multi-Sports in Quebec City in Canada that was part of Tier III of the 1999 WTA Tour. It was the 7th edition of the Challenge Bell, and was held from November 1 through November 7, 1999. Fourth-seeded Jennifer Capriati won the singles title.

== Finals ==
=== Singles ===
(United States) Jennifer Capriati defeated (United States) Chanda Rubin, 4–6, 6–1, 6–2

- It was Capriati's 2nd title of the year and the 8th of her career.

=== Doubles ===
(United States) Amy Frazier / (United States) Katie Schlukebir defeated (Zimbabwe) Cara Black / (United States) Debbie Graham, 6–2, 6–3

- It was Frazier's only title of the year and the 4th of her career. It was Schlukebir's only title of the year and the 1st of her career.
