= 1996 Challenge Bell =

- Date: October 21–27
- Edition: 4th
- Category: WTA Tier III
- Draw: 32S (10Q) / 16D (2Q)
- Prize money: US$164,250
- Surface: Carpet – indoors
- Location: Quebec City, Canada
- Venue: Club Avantage Multi-Sports

Champions

Singles
- (United States) Lisa Raymond

Doubles
- (United States) Debbie Graham (Netherlands) Brenda Schultz-McCarthy
← 1995 ·	Tournoi de Québec	· 1997 →

The 1996 Challenge Bell was a women's tennis tournament played on indoor carpet courts at the Club Avantage Multi-Sports in Quebec City in Canada that was part of Tier III of the 1996 WTA Tour. It was the 4th edition of the Challenge Bell, and was held from October 21 through October 27, 1996. Fifth-seeded Lisa Raymond won the singles title.

== Finals ==
=== Singles ===
(United States) Lisa Raymond defeated (Belgium) Els Callens, 6–4, 6–4

- It was Raymond's 2nd title of the year and the 5th of her career.

=== Doubles ===
(United States) Debbie Graham / (Netherlands) Brenda Schultz-McCarthy defeated (United States) Amy Frazier / (United States) Kimberly Po, 6–1, 6–4

- It was Graham's 2nd title of the year and the 4th of her career. It was Schultz-McCarthy's 6th title of the year and the 15th of her career.
