= 1998 Challenge Bell – Doubles =

Doubles
- 1998 Challenge Bell

Final
- Champions: (United States) Lori McNeil (United States) Kimberly Po
- Runners-up: (United States) Chanda Rubin (France) Sandrine Testud
- Score: 6–7^{(3–7)}, 7–5, 6–4

Details
- Draw: 16
- Seeds: 4

Events
Singles	Doubles
- Tournoi de Québec

Lisa Raymond and Rennae Stubbs were the reigning champions, but decided not to participate this year.

Lori McNeil and Kimberly Po won the title, defeating Chanda Rubin and Sandrine Testud 6–7^{(3–7)}, 7–5, 6–4 in the final.

== Seeds ==
1. (Belgium) Els Callens / (France) Julie Halard-Decugis (semifinals)
2. (United States) Lori McNeil / (United States) Kimberly Po (champions)
3. (United States) Chanda Rubin / (France) Sandrine Testud (final)
4. (Romania) Cătălina Cristea / (United States) Erika deLone (quarterfinals)

== Draw ==
Key

- Q = Qualifier
- WC = Wild card
- LL = Lucky loser
- Alt = Alternate
- ITF = ITF entry
- PR = Protected ranking
- SR = Special ranking
- SE = Special exempt
- JE = Junior exempt
- JR = Junior Accelerator Programme entrant
- CO = College Accelerator Programme entrant
- NG = Next Gen Accelerator Program entrant
- w/o = Walkover
- r = Retired
- d = Defaulted

First round
1	(Belgium) E Callens (France) J Halard-Decugis	6	2	6
(Canada) R Kolbovic (United States) M Washington	1	6	2
(France) A Cocheteux (France) N Dechy
(Switzerland) E Gagliardi (Germany) J Kandarr	w/o
3	(United States) C Rubin (France) S Testud	6	6
Q	(Germany) A Glass (Germany) B Rittner	2	4
(United States) A Frazier (United States) K Schlukebir	6	6
(Canada) P Hy-Boulais (Canada) R Simpson	1	2
(France) A Dechaume-Balleret (Italy) L Golarsa	6	6
(United States) J Chi (Canada) A Soukup	1	2
WC	(Canada) J Nejedly (Canada) M-È Pelletier	6	3	1
4	(Romania) C Cristea (United States) E deLone	2	6	6
(Canada) S Jeyaseelan (Croatia) M Murić	6	7
(Chinese Taipei) J Lee (Australia) N Pratt	4	5
(Mexico) J Fernández (United States) T Singian	4	5
2	(United States) L McNeil (United States) K Po	6	7

Quarterfinals
1	(Belgium) E Callens (France) J Halard-Decugis	6	6
(Switzerland) E Gagliardi (Germany) J Kandarr	4	1
3	(United States) C Rubin (France) S Testud	6	6
(United States) A Frazier (United States) K Schlukebir	2	2
(France) A Dechaume-Balleret (Italy) L Golarsa	6	6	6
4	(Romania) C Cristea (United States) E deLone	3	7	2
(Canada) S Jeyaseelan (Croatia) M Murić	4	6	0
2	(United States) L McNeil (United States) K Po	6	0	6

Semifinals
1	(Belgium) E Callens (France) J Halard-Decugis	6	4	4
3	(United States) C Rubin (France) S Testud	2	6	6
(France) A Dechaume-Balleret (Italy) L Golarsa	5	3
2	(United States) L McNeil (United States) K Po	7	6

Final
3	(United States) C Rubin (France) S Testud	7	5	4
2	(United States) L McNeil (United States) K Po	6	7	6
