= 1997 Challenge Bell =

- Date: October 20–26
- Edition: 5th
- Category: WTA Tier III
- Draw: 30S (24Q) / 16D (0Q)
- Prize money: US$164,250
- Surface: Carpet – indoors
- Location: Quebec City, Canada
- Venue: Club Avantage Multi-Sports

Champions

Singles
- (Netherlands) Brenda Schultz-McCarthy

Doubles
- (United States) Lisa Raymond / (Australia) Rennae Stubbs
← 1996 ·	Tournoi de Québec	· 1998 →

The 1997 Challenge Bell was a women's tennis tournament played on indoor carpet courts at the Club Avantage Multi-Sports in Quebec City in Canada that was part of the Tier III category of the 1997 WTA Tour. It was the 5th edition of the Challenge Bell, and was held from October 20 through October 26, 1997. First-seeded Brenda Schultz-McCarthy won the singles title for the second time in her career after 1995.

== Finals ==
=== Singles ===
(Netherlands) Brenda Schultz-McCarthy defeated (Belgium) Dominique Van Roost, 6–4, 6–7^{(4–7)}, 7–5

- It was Schultz-McCarthy's only title of the year and the 16th of her career.

=== Doubles ===
(United States) Lisa Raymond / (Australia) Rennae Stubbs defeated (France) Alexandra Fusai / (France) Nathalie Tauziat, 6–4, 5–7, 7–5

- It was Raymond's 1st title of the year and the 7th of her career. It was Stubbs' 1st title of the year and the 12th of her career.
