= Ioana Plesu =

Canadian tennis player

- Country (sports): Canada
- Born: December 17, 1980 (age 44)
- Height: 5 ft 4 in (163 cm)
- Plays: Right-handed

Singles
- Highest ranking: No. 715 (Jul 28, 2003)

Doubles
- Highest ranking: No. 545 (Jun 23, 2003)

Ioana Plesu (born December 17, 1980) is a Canadian former professional tennis player.

Plesu, born to Romanian immigrant parents, grew up in Sainte-Foy, Quebec and was a Canadian junior champion. She played four years of collegiate tennis for Duke University, after which she competed professionally. Her only WTA Tour singles main draw appearance came as a wildcard at the 1997 Challenge Bell. She stopped touring in order to study medicine and now works as a family physician.

== ITF finals ==
=== Doubles: 2 (0–2) ===
Outcome	No.	Date	Tournament	Surface	Partner	Opponents	Score
Runner-up	1.	Mar 1998	ITF Nuevo Laredo, Mexico	Hard	(Japan) Hiromi Bethard	(Peru) María Eugenia Rojas (Uruguay) Elena Juricich	3–6, 4–6
Runner-up	2.	Oct 2002	ITF Winter Park, USA	Clay	(United States) Marilyn Baker	(United States) Michelle Dasso (United States) Julie Ditty	2–6, 1–6
