= Katie Schlukebir =

American tennis player

- Full name: Katrina Schlukebir
- Country (sports): United States
- Born: April 29, 1975 (age 50) Kalamazoo, Michigan, U.S.
- Plays: Right-handed
- Prize money: $271,620

Singles
- Career record: 72–73
- Career titles: 0
- Highest ranking: No. 188 (October 26, 1998)

Doubles
- Career record: 145–123
- Career titles: 1 WTA
- Highest ranking: No. 46 (August 30, 1999)

Grand Slam doubles results
- Australian Open: 2R (2001)
- French Open: 2R (1998, 1999, 2001)
- Wimbledon: 3R (1999, 2000)
- US Open: QF (1998)

Grand Slam mixed doubles results
- Australian Open: 2R (2000)
- French Open: 2R (1999, 2000)
- Wimbledon: QF (2000)
- US Open: 1R (1999, 2001, 2002)

Katrina "Katie" Schlukebir (born April 29, 1975) is a former professional tennis player from the United States.

== Biography ==
Schlukebir was born in Kalamazoo, Michigan, to insurance agent John and tennis instructor Kathy. On her father's side she is of German and Dutch descent. She is the eldest of three daughters. Her youngest sister, Kristen, also became a professional tennis player. The middle sister, Karie, played tennis at Indiana University, before her death from cancer in 2010.

A right-handed player, Schlukebir started out in tennis aged four, introduced to the sport by her mother. She was runner-up in the girls' doubles event at the 1992 US Open, with partner Julie Steven. Later she played on the collegiate team at Stanford University and in 1997 was a member of the championship winning side. Individually she was a four-time All-American and in the championship year of 1997 won Stanford's award for both "Sophomore Athlete of the Year" and "Woman of the Year". She graduated in 1997 with a degree in psychology, then joined the professional tour full-time.

On the professional circuit, she specialised as a doubles player and peaked at No. 46 in the world. She made two WTA Tour finals, with her only title coming at the 1999 Challenge Bell in Quebec, partnering Amy Frazier.

Schlukebir was a regular competitor in doubles draws at Grand Slam competitions. She made the women's doubles quarterfinals at the 1998 US Open with Amy Frazier, along the way accounting for sixth seeds Anna Kournikova and Larisa Neiland. In 1999, she played mixed doubles with Mike Bryan at the French Open, Wimbledon and US Open. Her best Grand Slam performance in the mixed doubles was a quarterfinal appearance, partnering Eric Taino at the 2000 Wimbledon Championships, where they were beaten by Lleyton Hewitt and Kim Clijsters.

Following her playing career, she worked as a coach for the USTA.

== WTA career finals ==
=== Doubles: 2 (1 title, 1 runner-up) ===
Result	Date	Tournament	Tier	Surface	Partner	Opponents	Score
Win	Nov 1999	Tournoi de Québec, Canada	Tier III	Carpet (i)	(United States) Amy Frazier	(Zimbabwe) Cara Black (United States) Debbie Graham	6–2, 6–3
Loss	Jan 2001	Gold Coast International, Australia	Tier III	Hard	(United States) Meghann Shaughnessy	(Italy) Giulia Casoni (Slovakia) Janette Husárová	6–7^{(9–11)}, 5–7

== ITF finals ==
=== Singles (2–1) ===
Result	No.	Date	Tournament	Surface	Opponent	Score
Loss	1.	6 July 1997	Oklahoma, United States	Hard	(United States) Julie Thu	2–6, 4–6
Win	2.	25 October 1997	Puerto Vallarta, Mexico	Hard	(Czech Republic) Jana Ondrouchová	6–1, 7–6
Win	3.	23 November 1997	Caracas, Venezuela	Hard	(Venezuela) Melissa Mazzotta	7–5, 7–5

=== Doubles (12–4) ===
Result	No.	Date	Tournament	Surface	Partner	Opponents	Score
Win	1.	1 March 1992	Miami, United States	Hard	(United States) Lindsay Davenport	(Australia) Tracey Morton-Rodgers (Japan) Tamaka Takagi	6–1, 6–3
Loss	2.	7 July 1996	Williamsburg, United States	Hard	(United States) Ania Bleszynski	(Australia) Joanne Limmer (Australia) Lisa McShea	1–6, 1–6
Win	3.	6 July 1997	Oklahoma, United States	Hard	(United States) Julie Thu	(United States) Jennifer Russell (United States) Claire Sessions Bailey	6–2, 6–2
Win	4.	5 October 1997	Coatzacoalcos, Mexico	Hard	(United States) Melissa Zimpfer	(Israel) Nataly Cahana (Netherlands) Martine Vosseberg	6–4, 6–2
Win	5.	20 October 1997	Puerto Vallarta, Mexico	Hard	(United States) Erica Adams	(Turkey) Gülberk Gültekin (Nigeria) Clara Udofa	6–3, 6–4
Win	6.	23 November 1997	Caracas, Venezuela	Hard	(United States) Wendy Fix	(United Kingdom) Joanne Moore (United States) Rebecca Jensen	7–6^{(6)}, 4–6, 7–5
Loss	7.	19 April 1998	La Canada, United States	Hard	(Australia) Louise Pleming	(United States) Debbie Graham (United States) Jean Okada	6–2, 5–7, 3–6
Win	8.	26 April 1998	Indian Hill, United States	Hard	(United States) Erika deLone	(South Africa) Kim Grant (United States) Jolene Watanabe	6–4, 4–6, 6–3
Loss	9.	12 October 1998	Indian Wells, United States	Hard	(United States) Erika deLone	(United States) Lindsay Lee-Waters (New Zealand) Pavlina Nola	0–6, 7–6^{(4)}, 1–6
Win	10.	8 February 1999	Rockford, United States	Hard (i)	(United States) Lilia Osterloh	(Russia) Alina Jidkova (United States) Holly Parkinson	7–6, 6–2
Loss	11.	28 March 1999	Atlanta, United States	Hard	(Australia) Catherine Barclay	(Czech Republic) Lenka Němečková (United States) Meilen Tu	3–6, 3–6
Win	12.	24 October 1999	Nashville, United States	Hard	(United States) Nicole Arendt	(Japan) Shinobu Asagoe (Japan) Yuka Yoshida	6–1, 7–6
Win	13.	24 September 2000	Kirkland, United States	Hard	(Australia) Lisa McShea	(United States) Allison Bradshaw (United States) Abigail Spears	3–6, 6–2, 6–3
Win	14.	5 February 2001	Rockford, United States	Hard (i)	(United States) Kristen Schlukebir	(Bulgaria) Svetlana Krivencheva (Ukraine) Elena Tatarkova	7–6^{(4)}, 6–1
Win	15.	30 September 2001	Albuquerque, United States	Hard	(United States) Marissa Irvin	(Australia) Lisa McShea (Japan) Nana Smith	6–4, 1–6, 6–4
Win	16.	11 November 2001	Pittsburgh, United States	Hard (i)	(United States) Lilia Osterloh	(United States) Karin Miller (United States) Mashona Washington	6–1, 6–4
