= Tara Snyder =

American tennis player

- Country (sports): United States
- Residence: Wichita, Kansas, United States; Houston, Texas, United States
- Born: May 26, 1977 (age 49) Wichita, Kansas, United States
- Height: 1.75 m (5 ft 9 in)
- Turned pro: 1995
- Retired: 2006
- Plays: Right-handed (two-handed backhand)
- Prize money: $641,324

Singles
- Career record: 302 - 235
- Career titles: 1 WTA, 5 ITF
- Highest ranking: No. 33 (November 16, 1998)

Grand Slam singles results
- Australian Open: 2R (1998)
- French Open: 2R (1998)
- Wimbledon: 2R (1998, 1999)
- US Open: 3R (1999)

Doubles
- Career record: 43 - 71
- Career titles: 0 WTA, 3 ITF
- Highest ranking: No. 107 (April 10, 2000)

Grand Slam doubles results
- Australian Open: 2R (2000)
- French Open: DNP
- Wimbledon: 1R (2000)
- US Open: 2R (2000)
Medal record
Women's tennis
Representing the United States
Pan American Games
Silver medal – second place	1999 Winnipeg	Singles
- Last updated on: June 11, 2012.

Tara Snyder (born May 26, 1977) is a former tennis player from the United States, who started a professional career in May 1995. She reached her highest individual ranking in the WTA Tour on November 16, 1998, when she was ranked No. 33 in the world. Snyder won the silver medal at the 1999 Pan American Games in Winnipeg, Manitoba, Canada, after losing the final to Venezuela's María Vento-Kabchi. Tara won the US Junior Open and was regarded as one of the top US youth tennis players of her time.

Tara Snyder's father Darrel Snyder was a tennis teaching instructor and taught her the game. Tara's uncle Dave Snyder was the Texas Longhorns tennis coach for many years.
