= June 2010 in sports =

| << | June 2010 | | | | | >> |
| Su | Mo | Tu | We | Th | Fr | Sa |
| | | 1 | 2 | 3 | 4 | 5 |
| 6 | 7 | 8 | 9 | 10 | 11 | 12 |
| 13 | 14 | 15 | 16 | 17 | 18 | 19 |
| 20 | 21 | 22 | 23 | 24 | 25 | 26 |
| 27 | 28 | 29 | 30 |
Sports

This list shows notable sports-related deaths, events, and notable outcomes that occurred in June of 2010.

== Deaths in June ==
- 4: John Wooden
- 21: With Approval

== Current sporting seasons ==
=== Australian rules football 2010 ===
- Australian Football League

=== Auto racing 2010 ===
- Formula One
- Sprint Cup
- IRL IndyCar Series
- World Rally Championship
- Formula Two
- Nationwide Series
- Camping World Truck Series
- GP2 Series
- GP3 Series
- WTTC
- V8 Supercar
- American Le Mans
- Le Mans Series
- Superleague Formula
- Rolex Sports Car Series
- FIA GT1 World Championship
- Formula Three
- Auto GP
- World Series by Renault
- Deutsche Tourenwagen Masters
- Super GT

=== Baseball 2010 ===
- Major League Baseball
- Nippon Professional Baseball

=== Basketball 2010 ===
- WNBA
- Philippines
  - Fiesta Conference

=== Cricket 2010 ===
- England:
  - County Championship
  - Clydesdale Bank 40
  - Friends Provident t20

=== Association football 2010 ===
National teams competitions

- FIFA World Cup
- 2011 FIFA Women's World Cup qualification (UEFA)
- 2011 UEFA European Under-21 Championship qualification

International clubs competitions

- Copa Libertadores (South America)
- AFC (Asia) Champions League
- AFC Cup
- CAF (Africa) Champions League
- CAF Confederation Cup

Domestic (national) competitions

- Brazil
- Japan
- Norway
- Russia
- Major League Soccer (USA & Canada)
- Women's Professional Soccer (USA)

=== Golf 2010 ===
- PGA Tour
- European Tour
- LPGA Tour
- Champions Tour

=== Lacrosse 2010 ===
- Major League Lacrosse

=== Motorcycle racing 2010 ===
- Moto GP
- Superbike World Championship
- Supersport racing

=== Rugby league 2010 ===
- Super League
- NRL

=== Rugby union 2010 ===
- 2011 Rugby World Cup qualifying

== Days of the month ==
=== June 30, 2010 (Wednesday) ===
==== Cricket ====
- Australia in England:
  - 4th ODI in London:
    - Australia 290/5 (50 overs); England 212 (42.4 overs). **Australia win by 78 runs; England lead 5-match series 3–1.**

==== Football (soccer) ====
- UEFA Champions League:
  - First qualifying round, first leg: Tre Fiori (San Marino) 0–3 (Montenegro) Rudar Pljevlja
- (United States) Women's Professional Soccer:
  - WPS All-Star 2010 in Kennesaw, Georgia:
    - Marta's XI 5, Abby's XI 2

==== Tennis ====
- Grand Slams:
  - Wimbledon Championships in Wimbledon, London, United Kingdom:
    - Men's singles, quarter-finals:
      - **Tomáš Berdych** (CZE) [12] def. Roger Federer (SUI) [1] 6–4, 3–6, 6–1, 6–4
      - **Rafael Nadal** (ESP) [2] def. Robin Söderling (SWE) [6] 3–6, 6–3, 7–6(4), 6–1
      - **Novak Djokovic** (SRB) [3] def. Lu Yen-hsun (TPE) 6–3, 6–2, 6–2
      - **Andy Murray** (GBR) [4] def. Jo-Wilfried Tsonga (FRA) [10] 6–7(5), 7–6(5), 6–2, 6–2

==== Volleyball ====
- FIVB World League, Week 5: (teams in **bold** advance to final round)
  - Pool D: Germany 3–1 **Argentina**
    - Standings: Cuba 18 points (8 matches), Germany 16 (9), Poland 15 (8), Argentina 2 (9).

=== June 29, 2010 (Tuesday) ===
==== Baseball ====
- College World Series Final in Omaha, Nebraska (best-of-3 series):
  - South Carolina 2, UCLA 1 (11 innings). **South Carolina wins series 2–0.**
    - The Gamecocks win their first NCAA title in baseball, and their first NCAA team title in any men's sport.

==== Cricket ====
- South Africa in West Indies:
  - 3rd Test in Bridgetown, Barbados, Day 4:
    - West Indies 231 (73.5 overs) and 161 (65.1 overs); South Africa 346 (134.4 overs) and 49/3 (8.4 overs). **South Africa win by 7 wickets; win 3-match series 2–0.**

==== Football (soccer) ====
- FIFA World Cup in South Africa:
  - Round of 16:
    - In Pretoria: **Paraguay** 0–0 (5–3 pen.) Japan
      - Paraguay reach the quarter-finals for the first time, and join Uruguay, Argentina and Brazil for a record of four South American teams in the last eight.
    - In Cape Town: **Spain** 1–0 Portugal
- UEFA Champions League:
  - First qualifying round, first leg: FC Santa Coloma (Andorra) – (Malta) Birkirkara
    - The match is postponed due to bad pitch conditions. Match awarded to Birkirkara 3–0.

==== Tennis ====
- Grand Slams:
  - Wimbledon Championships in Wimbledon, London, United Kingdom:
    - Women's singles, quarter-finals:
      - **Serena Williams** (USA) [1] def. Li Na (CHN) [9] 7–5, 6–3
      - **Tsvetana Pironkova** (BUL) def. Venus Williams (USA) [2] 6–2, 6–3
      - **Vera Zvonareva** (RUS) [21] def. Kim Clijsters (BEL) [8] 6–3, 4–6, 6–2
      - **Petra Kvitová** (CZE) def. Kaia Kanepi (EST) 4–6, 7–6(8), 8–6

=== June 28, 2010 (Monday) ===
==== Baseball ====
- College World Series Final in Omaha, Nebraska (best-of-3 series):
  - South Carolina 7, UCLA 1. **South Carolina leads series 1–0.**

==== Beach handball ====
- World Championships in Antalya, Turkey:
  - Men:
    - 3rd/4th place: Egypt 1–2 (bronze) **Turkey**
    - Final: (gold) **Brazil** 2–0 (silver) Hungary
      - Brazil win the championship for the second time.
  - Women:
    - 3rd/4th place: (bronze) **Brazil** 2–0 Ukraine
    - Final: (silver) Denmark 0–2 (gold) **Norway**
      - Norway win the championship for the first time.

==== Cricket ====
- South Africa in West Indies:
  - 3rd Test in Bridgetown, Barbados, Day 3:
    - West Indies 231 (73.5 overs) and 134/7 (57 overs); South Africa 346 (134.4 overs). West Indies lead by 19 runs with 3 wickets remaining.

==== Football (soccer) ====
- FIFA World Cup in South Africa:
  - Round of 16:
    - In Durban: **Netherlands** 2–1 Slovakia
      - The Netherlands score four wins in a World Cup tournament for the first time since 1974.
    - In Johannesburg: **Brazil** 3–0 Chile
      - Brazil reach the quarterfinals for the fifth straight time.

==== Tennis ====
- Grand Slams:
  - Wimbledon Championships in Wimbledon, London, United Kingdom:
    - Men's singles, fourth round:
      - **Roger Federer** (SUI) [1] def. Jürgen Melzer (AUT) [16] 6–3, 6–2, 6–3
      - **Rafael Nadal** (ESP) [2] def. Paul-Henri Mathieu (FRA) 6–4, 6–2, 6–2
      - **Novak Djokovic** (SRB) [3] def. Lleyton Hewitt (AUS) [15] 7–5, 6–4, 3–6, 6–4
      - **Andy Murray** (GBR) [4] def. Sam Querrey (USA) [18] 7–5, 6–3, 6–4
      - **Lu Yen-hsun** (TPE) def. Andy Roddick (USA) [5] 4–6, 7–6(3), 7–6(4), 6–7(5), 9–7
      - **Robin Söderling** (SWE) [6] def. David Ferrer (ESP) [9] 6–2, 5–7, 6–2, 3–6, 7–5
      - **Jo-Wilfried Tsonga** (FRA) [10] def. Julien Benneteau (FRA) [32] 6–1, 6–4, 3–6, 6–1
      - **Tomáš Berdych** (CZE) [12] def. Daniel Brands (GER) 4–6, 7–6(1), 7–5, 6–3
    - Women's singles, fourth round:
      - **Serena Williams** (USA) [1] def. Maria Sharapova (RUS) [16] 7–6(9), 6–4
      - **Venus Williams** (USA) [2] def. Jarmila Groth (AUS) 6–4, 7–6(5)
      - **Petra Kvitová** (CZE) def. Caroline Wozniacki (DEN) [3] 6–2, 6–0
      - **Vera Zvonareva** (RUS) [21] def. Jelena Janković (SRB) [4] 6–1, 3–0 retired
      - **Li Na** (CHN) [9] def. Agnieszka Radwańska (POL) [7] 6–3, 6–2
      - **Kim Clijsters** (BEL) [8] def. Justine Henin (BEL) [17] 2–6, 6–2, 6–3
      - **Tsvetana Pironkova** (BUL) def. Marion Bartoli (FRA) [11] 6–4, 6–4
      - **Kaia Kanepi** (EST) def. Klára Zakopalová (CZE) 6–2, 6–4

=== June 27, 2010 (Sunday) ===
==== Auto racing ====
- Formula One:
  - European Grand Prix in Valencia, Spain:
    - (1) Sebastian Vettel (GER) (Red Bull–Renault) (2) Lewis Hamilton (GBR) (McLaren–Mercedes) (3) Jenson Button (GBR) (McLaren-Mercedes)
      - Drivers' championship standings (after 9 of 19 races): (1) Hamilton 127 points (2) Button 121 (3) Vettel 115
      - Constructors' championship standings: (1) McLaren 248 points (2) Red Bull 218 (3) Ferrari 165
- NASCAR Sprint Cup Series:
  - Lenox Industrial Tools 301 in Loudon, New Hampshire:
    - (1) (California) Jimmie Johnson (Chevrolet; Hendrick Motorsports) (2) (Indiana) Tony Stewart (Chevrolet; Stewart Haas Racing) (3) (Nevada) Kurt Busch (Dodge; Penske Racing)
      - Drivers' championship standings (after 17 of 36 races): (1) (California) Kevin Harvick (Chevrolet; Richard Childress Racing) 2489 points (2) Johnson 2384 (3) (Nevada) Kyle Busch (Toyota; Joe Gibbs Racing) 2328

==== Badminton ====
- Europe Cup in Zwolle, Netherlands:
  - Final: Favorite-Ramenskoe (Russia) 2–4 (Germany) **1. BC Saarbrücken**
    - Saarbrücken win the championship for the first time.

==== Cricket ====
- South Africa in West Indies:
  - 3rd Test in Bridgetown, Barbados, Day 2:
    - West Indies 231 (73.5 overs); South Africa 285/6 (104 overs). South Africa lead by 54 runs with 4 wickets remaining in the 1st innings.
- Australia in England:
  - 3rd ODI in Manchester:
    - Australia 212 (46 overs); England 214/9 (49.1 overs). **England win by 1 wicket; lead 5-match series 3–0.**

==== Equestrianism ====
- Show jumping:
  - British Jumping Derby in Hickstead: (gold) Guy Williams (GBR) on Skip Two Ramiro (silver) Tina Fletcher (GBR) on Promised Land (bronze) six third-placed riders/horses, in the fastest time: Andre Thieme (GER) on Nacorde

==== Football (soccer) ====
- FIFA World Cup in South Africa:
  - Round of 16:
    - In Bloemfontein: **Germany** 4–1 England
      - Germany reach the last 8 for the 15th straight time and 16th overall.
    - In Johannesburg: **Argentina** 3–1 Mexico
      - Argentina and Germany will meet in the quarterfinal for the second successive time.

==== Golf ====
- Women's majors:
  - LPGA Championship Presented by Wegmans in Pittsford, New York, United States:
    - Final leaderboard: (1) Cristie Kerr (USA) 269 (–19) (2) Song-Hee Kim (KOR) 281 (–7) (3) Ai Miyazato (JPN) & Jiyai Shin (KOR) 283 (–5)
      - Kerr wins the tournament by twelve strokes, claiming her second major and fourteenth LPGA Tour title.
- PGA Tour:
  - Travelers Championship in Cromwell, Connecticut:
    - Winner: Bubba Watson (USA) 266 (−14)^{PO}
      - Watson wins his first PGA Tour title on the second playoff hole.
- European Tour:
  - BMW International Open in Germany:
    - Winner: David Horsey (ENG) 270 (−18)
      - Horsey wins his first European Tour title.
- Champions Tour:
  - Dick's Sporting Goods Open in Endicott, New York:
    - Winner: Loren Roberts (USA) 201 (−15)
      - Roberts wins his twelfth Champions Tour title.

==== Horse racing ====
- Irish Derby in County Kildare (all horses trained by Aidan O'Brien):
  - (1) Cape Blanco (jockey: Johnny Murtagh) (2) Midas Touch (jockey: Colm O'Donoghue) (3) Jan Vermeer (jockey: Seamie Heffernan)

==== Motorcycle racing ====
- Superbike:
  - Misano Superbike World Championship round in Misano Adriatico, Italy:
    - Race 1: (1) Max Biaggi (ITA) (Aprilia RSV 4) (2) Carlos Checa (ESP) (Ducati 1098R) (3) Troy Corser (AUS) (BMW S1000RR)
    - Race 2: (1) Biaggi (2) Leon Haslam (GBR) (Suzuki GSX-R1000) (3) Michel Fabrizio (ITA) (Ducati 1098R)
      - Riders' championship standings (after 8 of 13 rounds): (1) Biaggi 307 points (2) Haslam 270 (3) Checa 172
      - Manufacturers' championship standings: (1) Aprilia 313 points (2) Suzuki 283 (3) Ducati 250
- Supersport:
  - Misano Supersport World Championship round in Misano Adriatico, Italy:
    - (1) Eugene Laverty (IRL) (Honda CBR600RR) (2) Joan Lascorz (ESP) (Kawasaki Ninja ZX-6R) (3) Kenan Sofuoğlu (TUR) (Honda CBR600RR)
      - Riders' championship standings (after 8 of 13 rounds): (1) Laverty 161 points (2) Sofuoğlu 158 (3) Lascorz 148
      - Manufacturers' championship standings: (1) Honda 195 points (2) Kawasaki 148 (3) Triumph 107

==== Snooker ====
- Players Tour Championship
  - Event 1 in Sheffield, England:
    - Final: Mark Williams (WAL) def. Stephen Maguire (SCO) 4–0

==== Volleyball ====
- FIVB World League, Week 4: (teams in **bold** advance to final round, teams in ~~strike~~ are eliminated)
  - Pool A:
    - Netherlands 2–3 Brazil
    - Bulgaria 3–1 ~~South Korea~~
      - Standings (after 8 matches): Brazil, Bulgaria 19 points, Netherlands 10, South Korea 0.
  - Pool B:
    - ~~China~~ 2–3 Serbia
    - ~~France~~ 1–3 Italy
      - Standings (after 8 matches): Serbia 20 points, Italy 18, France 6, China 4.
  - Pool D: Poland 3–1 **Argentina**
    - Standings (after 8 matches): Cuba 18 points, Poland 15, Germany 13, Argentina 2.
- Men's European League, Week 4:
  - Pool A: Spain 3–2 Slovakia
    - Standings (after 8 matches): Romania 14 points, Spain 13, Great Britain 11, Slovakia 10.
  - Pool B:
    - Portugal 3–1 Austria
    - Turkey 3–1 Greece
      - Standings (after 8 matches): Portugal 16 points, Turkey 13, Greece, Austria 9.
- Women's European League, Week 4:
  - Pool B:
    - Spain 3–2 Greece
    - Turkey 3–0 Israel (technical win)
      - Standings (after 6 matches): Turkey 11 points, Spain 10, Israel 8, Greece 7.

=== June 26, 2010 (Saturday) ===
==== Auto racing ====
- Nationwide Series:
  - New England 200 in Loudon, New Hampshire: (1) (Nevada) Kyle Busch (Toyota; Joe Gibbs Racing) (2) (Michigan) Brad Keselowski (Dodge; Penske Racing) (3) (Missouri) Carl Edwards (Ford; Roush Fenway Racing)
    - Drivers' championship standings (after 16 of 35 races): (1) Keselowski 2641 points (2) Edwards 2394 (3) (Illinois) Justin Allgaier (Dodge; Penske Racing) 2201

==== Badminton ====
- Europe Cup in Zwolle, Netherlands:
  - Quarterfinals: **1. BC Saarbrücken** (Germany) 4–0 (Spain) Soderinsa Rinconada
  - Semifinals:
    - **Favorite-Ramenskoe** (Russia) 4–0 (France) Issy Les Moulineaux
    - **1. BC Saarbrücken** (Germany) 4–2 (Russia) Nizhni Novgorod

==== Cricket ====
- South Africa in West Indies:
  - 3rd Test in Bridgetown, Barbados, Day 1:
    - West Indies 231 (73.5 overs); South Africa 46/2 (14 overs). South Africa trail by 185 runs with 8 wickets remaining in the 1st innings.

==== Equestrianism ====
- Show jumping:
  - Global Champions Tour:
    - 5th Competition in Monte Carlo: (gold) Bernardo Alves (BRA) on Bridgit (silver) Jessica Kürten (IRL) on Libertina (bronze) Jos Lansink (BEL) on Valentina van't Heike
      - Standings (after 5 of 9 competitions): (1) Marco Kutscher (GER) 138 points (2) Kürten 137 (3) Lansink 126
  - FEI Nations Cup Promotional League:
    - FEI Nations Cup of Norway in Drammen (CSIO 3*): (gold) Norway (Stein Endresen on Hoyo de Monterey, Geir Gulliksen on L'Espoir, Connie Bull on Cézanne, Morten Djupvik on Bessemeind's Casino) (silver) Italy (Roberto Cristofoletti on Las Vegas, Alberto Cocconi on Magellan D'Uthah, Gabriele Grassi on American Blu van Eeklelchem, Emilio Bicocchi on Kapitol D'Argonne) (bronze) Belgium (Pieter Devos on Utopia van den Donkhoeve, Rik Hemeryck on Quarco de Kerambars, Kevin Gielen on Robbedoes, Niels Bruynseels on Carpalo)
      - Standings (after 10 of 12 competitions): (1) Italy 55.5 points (2) Belgium 54 (3) Norway 39

==== Football (soccer) ====
- FIFA World Cup in South Africa:
  - Round of 16:
    - In Port Elizabeth: **Uruguay** 2–1 South Korea
      - Uruguay advance to the quarter-finals for the first time since 1970.
    - In Rustenburg: United States 1–2 (a.e.t.) **Ghana**
      - Ghana reach the quarter-finals for the first time and become the third African team to do so.
- UEFA U-17 Women's Championship in Nyon, Switzerland: (teams in **bold** qualify for FIFA U-17 Women's World Cup)
  - Third place match: Netherlands 0–3 (bronze) **Germany**
  - Final: (gold) **Spain** 0–0 (4–1 pen.) (silver) **Republic of Ireland**
    - Spain win the Championship for the first time.

==== Golf ====
- Women's majors:
  - LPGA Championship Presented by Wegmans in Pittsford, New York, United States:
    - Leaderboard after third round: (1) Cristie Kerr (USA) 203 (–13) (2) Jimin Kang (KOR), Azahara Muñoz (ESP) & Mika Miyazato (JPN) 211 (–5)

==== Handball ====
- American Men's Handball Championship in Santiago, Chile: (teams in **bold** qualify for 2011 World Championship)
  - 7th/8th place: Dominican Republic 22–33 Canada
  - 5th/6th place: Uruguay 30–27 Greenland
  - 3rd/4th place: (bronze) **Chile** 34–31 Cuba
  - Final: (silver) **Brazil** 27–28 (gold) **Argentina**
    - Argentina win the Championship for the fourth time.

==== Motorcycle racing ====
- Moto GP:
  - Dutch TT in Assen, Netherlands:
    - MotoGP: (1) Jorge Lorenzo (ESP) (Yamaha) (2) Dani Pedrosa (ESP) (Honda) (3) Casey Stoner (AUS) (Ducati)
      - Riders' championship standings (after 6 of 18 rounds): (1) Lorenzo 140 points (2) Pedrosa 93 (3) Andrea Dovizioso (ITA) (Honda) 89
      - Manufacturers' championship standings: (1) Yamaha 145 points (2) Honda 117 (3) Ducati 81
    - Moto2: (1) Andrea Iannone (ITA) (Speed Up) (2) Toni Elías (ESP) (Moriwaki) (3) Thomas Lüthi (SUI) (Moriwaki)
      - Riders' championship standings (after 6 of 17 rounds): (1) Elías 100 points (2) Shoya Tomizawa (JPN) (Suter) 76 (3) Lüthi 74
      - Manufacturers' championship standings: (1) Moriwaki 116 points (2) Suter 111 (3) Speed Up 81
    - 125cc: (1) Marc Márquez (ESP) (Derbi) (2) Nicolás Terol (ESP) (Aprilia) (3) Pol Espargaró (ESP) (Derbi)
      - Riders' championship standings (after 6 of 17 rounds): (1) Terol 118 points (2) Espargaró 115 (3) Márquez 107
      - Manufacturers' championship standings: (1) Derbi 145 points (2) Aprilia 121 (3) Honda 7

==== Rugby union ====
- IRB Pacific Nations Cup:
  - Japan 26–23 Tonga in Apia
  - Fiji 9–31 Samoa in Apia
    - Final standings: Samoa, Fiji 9 points, Japan 8, Tonga 4.
      - Samoa win the Cup for the first time.
- Mid-year Tests:
  - Week 5:
    - New Zealand 29–10 Wales in Hamilton
    - Australia 22–15 Ireland in Brisbane
    - South Africa 55–11 Italy in East London
    - Argentina 41–13 France in Buenos Aires

==== Tennis ====
- Grand Slams:
  - Wimbledon Championships in Wimbledon, London, United Kingdom:
    - Men's singles, third round:
      - **Rafael Nadal** (ESP) [2] def. Philipp Petzschner (GER) [33] 6–4, 4–6, 6–7(5), 6–2, 6–3
      - **Andy Murray** (GBR) [4] def. Gilles Simon (FRA) [26] 6–1, 6–4, 6–4
      - **Robin Söderling** (SWE) [6] def. Thomaz Bellucci (BRA) [25] 6–4, 6–2, 7–5
      - **David Ferrer** (ESP) [9] def. Jérémy Chardy (FRA) 7–5, 6–3, 4–6, 3–6, 7–5
      - **Jo-Wilfried Tsonga** (FRA) [10] def. Tobias Kamke (GER) 6–1, 6–4, 7–6(1)
    - Women's singles, third round:
      - **Serena Williams (USA)** [1] def. Dominika Cibulková (SVK) 6–0, 7–5
      - **Caroline Wozniacki** (DEN) [3] def. Anastasia Pavlyuchenkova (RUS) [29] 7–5, 6–4
      - **Agnieszka Radwańska** (POL) [7] def. Sara Errani (ITA) [32] 6–3, 6–1
      - **Li Na** (CHN) [9] def. Anastasia Rodionova (AUS) 6–1, 6–3
      - **Klára Zakopalová** (CZE) def. Flavia Pennetta (ITA) [10] 6–2, 6–3

==== Volleyball ====
- FIVB World League, Week 4: (teams in **bold** advance to final round, teams in ~~strike~~ are eliminated)
  - Pool A:
    - Netherlands 1–3 Brazil
    - Bulgaria 3–0 ~~South Korea~~
      - Standings (after 7 matches): Brazil 17 points, Bulgaria 16, Netherlands 9, South Korea 0.
  - Pool B: ~~China~~ 1–3 Serbia
    - Standings (after 7 matches): Serbia 18 points, Italy 15, France 6, China 3.
  - Pool C:
    - ~~Egypt~~ 0–3 Russia
    - United States 3–1 Finland
      - Standings (after 8 matches): Russia 23 points, United States 16, Finland 6, Egypt 3.
  - Pool D:
    - Germany 1–3 Cuba
    - Poland 3–1 **Argentina**
      - Standings: Cuba 18 points (8 matches), Germany 13 (8), Poland 12 (7), Argentina 2 (7).
- Men's European League, Week 4:
  - Pool A:
    - Spain 3–1 Slovakia
    - Romania 3–2 Great Britain
      - Standings: Romania 14 points (8 matches), Spain 11 (7), Great Britain 11 (8), Slovakia 9 (7).
  - Pool B:
    - Portugal 3–0 Austria
    - Turkey 3–1 Greece
      - Standings (after 7 matches): Portugal 14 points, Turkey 11, Greece 9, Austria 8.
- Women's European League, Week 4:
  - Pool A:
    - Romania 3–0 Great Britain
    - Serbia 1–3 Bulgaria
      - Standings: Romania 12 points (8 matches), Serbia, Bulgaria 11 (6), Great Britain 8 (8).
  - Pool B:
    - Spain 3–0 Greece
    - Turkey 3–0 Israel (technical win)
      - All four matches between Turkey and Israel were cancelled due to political tension between the countries. The results were set as 3–0 for the home teams.
      - Standings (after 5 matches): Turkey 9 points, Spain 8, Israel 7, Greece 6.
- Women's Pan-American Cup in Rosarito and Tijuana, Mexico:
  - Classification 7–8: Brazil 1–3 **Canada**
  - Classification 5–6: **Argentina** 3–0 Puerto Rico
  - Classification 3–4: (bronze) **United States** 3–0 Cuba
  - Final: (gold) **Dominican Republic** 3–0 (silver) Peru
    - Dominican Republic win the Cup for the second time.

=== June 25, 2010 (Friday) ===
==== Baseball ====
- Major League Baseball
  - Edwin Jackson of the Arizona Diamondbacks hurled the fourth no-hitter of the season as he beat the Tampa Bay Rays, 1–0.

==== Football (soccer) ====
- FIFA World Cup in South Africa: (teams in **bold** advance to the round of 16)
  - Group G:
    - In Durban: North Korea 0–3 Ivory Coast
    - In Nelspruit: **Portugal** 0–0 **Brazil**
      - Final standings: Brazil 7 points, Portugal 5, Côte d'Ivoire 4, Korea DPR 0.
  - Group H:
    - In Pretoria: **Chile** 1–2 **Spain**
      - Chile advance beyond the first round for the first time since 1962.
    - In Bloemfontein: Switzerland 0–0 Honduras
      - Final standings: Spain, Chile 6 points, Switzerland 4, Honduras 1.
      - After the conclusion of the first stage, all five South American teams advance to the Round of 16, while a record of seven European teams (out of 13) are eliminated.

==== Golf ====
- Women's majors:
  - LPGA Championship Presented by Wegmans in Pittsford, New York, United States:
    - Leaderboard after second round: (1) Cristie Kerr (USA) 134 (–10) (2) Mika Miyazato (JPN) & Inbee Park (KOR) 139 (–5)

==== Handball ====
- American Men's Handball Championship in Santiago, Chile:
  - 5th–8th place:
    - Dominican Republic 24–28 **Uruguay**
    - **Greenland** 38–36 (OT) Canada
  - Semifinals:
    - **Brazil** 33–21 Chile
    - **Argentina** 17–8 Cuba
      - Play is suspended due to a bomb alarm inside the hall. Argentina is declared the winner.
      - Brazil and Argentina both advance to the final for the fifth straight time, and qualify for 2011 World Championship.

==== Ice hockey ====
- NHL entry draft in Los Angeles, California:
  - The Edmonton Oilers select left winger Taylor Hall of the Windsor Spitfires, with the first overall draft pick.

==== Tennis ====
- Grand Slams:
  - Wimbledon Championships in Wimbledon, London, United Kingdom:
    - Men's singles, third round:
      - **Roger Federer** (SUI) [1] def. Arnaud Clément (FRA) 6–2, 6–4, 6–2
      - **Novak Djokovic** (SRB) [3] def. Albert Montañés (ESP) [28] 6–1, 6–4, 6–4
      - **Andy Roddick** (USA) [5] def. Philipp Kohlschreiber (GER) [29] 7–5, 6–7(5), 6–3, 6–3
    - Women's singles, third round:
      - **Venus Williams** (USA) [2] def. Alisa Kleybanova (RUS) [26] 6–4, 6–2
      - **Jelena Janković** (SRB) [4] def. Alona Bondarenko (UKR) [28] 6–0, 6–3
      - **Kim Clijsters** (BEL) [8] def. Maria Kirilenko (RUS) [27] 6–3, 6–3

==== Volleyball ====
- FIVB World League, Week 4: (teams in **bold** advance to final round)
  - Pool B: France 3–2 Italy
    - Standings: Serbia 15 points (6 matches), Italy 15 (7), France 6 (7), China 3 (6).
  - Pool C:
    - Egypt 0–3 Russia
    - United States 2–3 Finland
      - Standings (after 7 matches): Russia 20 points, United States 13, Finland 6, Egypt 3.
  - Pool D: Germany 2–3 Cuba
    - Standings: Cuba 15 points (7 matches), Germany 13 (7), Poland 9 (6), **Argentina** 2 (6).
- Men's European League, Week 4:
  - Pool A: Romania 3–0 Great Britain
    - Standings: Romania 12 points (7 matches), Great Britain 10 (7), Spain 9 (6), Slovakia 8 (6).
- Women's European League, Week 4:
  - Pool A:
    - Romania 3–1 Great Britain
    - Serbia 3–2 Bulgaria
      - Standings: Serbia 10 points (5 matches), Romania 10 (7), Bulgaria 9 (5), Great Britain 7 (7).
- Women's Pan-American Cup in Rosarito and Tijuana, Mexico:
  - Classification 9: **Mexico** 3–1 Trinidad and Tobago
  - Classification 5–8:
    - **Puerto Rico** 3–2 Brazil
    - Canada 2–3 **Argentina**
  - Semifinals:
    - Cuba 0–3 **Peru**
    - United States 1–3 **Dominican Republic**

=== June 24, 2010 (Thursday) ===
==== Basketball ====
- NBA draft in New York City:
  - The Washington Wizards select Kentucky Wildcats freshman John Wall with the first overall pick. Fellow Wildcats DeMarcus Cousins (5th, Sacramento Kings), Patrick Patterson (14th, Houston Rockets), Eric Bledsoe (18th, Oklahoma City Thunder) and Daniel Orton (29th, Orlando Magic) are also drafted in the first round, making Kentucky the first school to have five players drafted in the first round in any NBA Draft.

==== Cricket ====
- Asia Cup in Dambulla, Sri Lanka:
  - Final: India 268/6 (50 overs); Sri Lanka 187 (44.4 overs). **India win by 81 runs.**
    - India wins the Cup for the fifth time.
- Australia in England:
  - 2nd ODI in Cardiff:
    - Australia 239/7 (50 overs); England 243/6 (45.2 overs). **England win by 4 wickets; lead 5-match series 2–0.**

==== Football (soccer) ====
- FIFA World Cup in South Africa: (teams in **bold** advance to the round of 16)
  - Group E:
    - In Rustenburg: Denmark 1–3 **Japan**
    - In Cape Town: Cameroon 1–2 **Netherlands**
      - Final standings: Netherlands 9 points, Japan 6, Denmark 3, Cameroon 0.
  - Group F:
    - In Johannesburg: **Slovakia** 3–2 Italy
      - Italy, the defending champion, fail to advance beyond the first round for the first time since 1974.
    - In Polokwane: **Paraguay** 0–0 New Zealand
      - Final standings: Paraguay 5 points, Slovakia 4, New Zealand 3, Italy 2.
- 2011 FIFA Women's World Cup qualification (UEFA): (teams in ~~strike~~ are eliminated)
  - Group 3: Scotland 0–1 Denmark
    - Standings: Denmark 19 points (7 matches), Scotland 15 (6), ~~Greece~~ 9 (6), ~~Bulgaria~~ 4 (6), ~~Georgia~~ 0 (7).
  - Group 4: Poland 1–0 ~~Bosnia and Herzegovina~~
    - Standings: Poland 16 points (7 matches), ~~Hungary~~ 12 (7), Ukraine 11 (6), ~~Romania~~ 8 (6), Bosnia and Herzegovina 0 (8).
  - Group 5: Spain 9–0 ~~Malta~~
    - Standings: Spain 19 points (8 matches), England 16 (6), ~~Austria~~ 9 (6), ~~Turkey~~ 6 (6), Malta 0 (8).
  - Group 6: Russia 4–0 ~~Israel~~
    - Standings: Switzerland 18 points (7 matches), Russia 15 (6), ~~Republic of Ireland~~ 9 (6), Israel 6 (7), ~~Kazakhstan~~ 0 (5)

==== Golf ====
- Women's majors:
  - LPGA Championship Presented by Wegmans in Pittsford, New York, United States:
    - Leaderboard after first round (USA unless indicated): (1) Cristie Kerr, Seon Hwa Lee (KOR) & Stacy Lewis 68 (–4)

==== Handball ====
- American Men's Handball Championship in Santiago, Chile: (teams in **bold** advance to semifinals)
  - Group A:
    - Canada 29–32 Uruguay
    - **Argentina** 26–18 **Chile**
      - Final standings: Argentina 6 points, Chile, Uruguay 3, Canada 0.
  - Group B:
    - **Brazil** 41–26 **Cuba**
    - Greenland 25–20 Dominican Republic
      - Final standings: Brazil 6 points, Cuba 4, Greenland 2, Dominican Republic 0.

==== Tennis ====
- Grand Slams:
  - Wimbledon Championships in Wimbledon, London, United Kingdom:
    - Men's singles, first round:
      - **John Isner** (USA) [23] def. Nicolas Mahut (FRA) 6–4, 3–6, 6–7(7), 7–6(3), 70–68
        - After 11 hours and 5 minutes, Isner advances to the second round to play Thiemo de Bakker (NED).
    - Men's singles, second round:
      - **Rafael Nadal** (ESP) [2] def. Robin Haase (NED) 5–7, 6–2, 3–6, 6–0, 6–3
      - **Andy Murray** (GBR) [4] def. Jarkko Nieminen (FIN) 6–3, 6–4, 6–2
      - **Robin Söderling** (SWE) [6] def. Marcel Granollers (ESP) 7–5, 6–1, 6–4
      - **David Ferrer** (ESP) [9] def. Florent Serra (FRA) 6–3, 7–5, 6–7(6), 6–3
      - **Jo-Wilfried Tsonga** (FRA) [10] def. Alexandr Dolgopolov (UKR) 6–4, 6–4, 6–7(5), 5–7, 10–8
    - Women's singles, second round:
      - **Serena Williams** (USA) [1] def. Anna Chakvetadze (RUS) 6–0, 6–1
      - **Caroline Wozniacki** (DEN) [3] def. Chang Kai-chen (TPE) 6–4, 6–3
      - **Agnieszka Radwańska** (POL) [7] def. Alberta Brianti (ITA) 6–2, 6–0
      - **Li Na** (CHN) [9] def. Kurumi Nara (JPN) 6–2, 6–4
      - **Flavia Pennetta** (ITA) [10] def. Monica Niculescu (ROU) 6–1, 6–1

==== Volleyball ====
- Women's Pan-American Cup in Rosarito and Tijuana, Mexico:
  - Classification 5–10:
    - Mexico 0–3 **Brazil**
    - Trinidad and Tobago 0–3 **Canada**
  - Quarterfinals:
    - **Dominican Republic** 3–0 Puerto Rico
    - **Peru** 3–1 Argentina

=== June 23, 2010 (Wednesday) ===
==== Baseball ====
- Major League Baseball news:
  - The Florida Marlins fire their manager Fredi González, becoming the third team to do so this season. Edwin Rodríguez, previously the manager of the New Orleans Zephyrs, the Marlins' Triple-A affiliate, is named interim manager for the remainder of the season. (ESPN)

==== Football (soccer) ====
- FIFA World Cup in South Africa: (teams in **bold** advance to the round of 16)
  - Group C:
    - In Port Elizabeth: Slovenia 0–1 **England**
    - In Pretoria: **United States** 1–0 Algeria
      - Final standings: United States, England 5 points, Slovenia 4, Algeria 1.
  - Group D:
    - In Johannesburg: **Ghana** 0–1 **Germany**
    - In Nelspruit: Australia 2–1 Serbia
      - Final standings: Germany 6 points, Ghana, Australia 4, Serbia 3.
- 2011 FIFA Women's World Cup qualification (UEFA): (teams in **bold** advance to qualification play-offs, teams in ~~strike~~ are eliminated)
  - Group 1:
    - ~~Estonia~~ 0–6 France
    - ~~Northern Ireland~~ 0–0 ~~Serbia~~
      - Standings: France 24 points (8 matches), Iceland 21 (8), Estonia 9 (7), Serbia 8 (8), Northern Ireland 4 (7), ~~Croatia~~ 1 (8)
  - Group 2:
    - ~~North Macedonia~~ 1–6 ~~Slovakia~~
    - Norway 3–0 ~~Belarus~~
      - Standings: Norway 16 points (6 matches),Netherlands 14 (7), Belarus 10 (6), Slovakia 6 (6), Macedonia 0 (7).
  - Group 4: Ukraine 0–0 Romania
    - Standings: Poland 13 points (6 matches), Hungary 12 (7), Ukraine 11 (6), Romania 8 (6), ~~Bosnia and Herzegovina~~ 0 (7).
  - Group 5: ~~Austria~~ 3–0 ~~Turkey~~
    - Standings: England 16 points (6 matches), Spain 16 (7), Austria 9 (6), Turkey 6 (6), ~~Malta~~ 0 (7).
  - Group 6: ~~Kazakhstan~~ 2–4 Switzerland
    - Standings: Switzerland 18 points (7 matches), Russia 12 (5), ~~Republic of Ireland~~ 9 (6), ~~Israel~~ 6 (6), Kazakhstan 0 (5)
  - Group 7:
    - ~~Portugal~~ 1–0 ~~Slovenia~~
    - ~~Finland~~ 1–3 **Italy**
      - Standings: Italy 22 points (8 matches), Finland 16 (7), Portugal 9 (7), Slovenia 6 (7), ~~Armenia~~ 0 (7).
  - Group 8: Sweden 17–0 ~~Azerbaijan~~
    - Standings: Sweden 16 points (6 matches), Czech Republic 10 (6), ~~Belgium~~ 10 (8), ~~Wales~~ 6 (6), Azerbaijan 4 (6).

==== Handball ====
- American Men's Handball Championship in Santiago, Chile: (teams in **bold** advance to semifinals, teams in ~~strike~~ are eliminated)
  - Group A:
    - ~~Canada~~ 12–39 **Argentina**
    - Chile 27–27 Uruguay
      - Standings (after 2 matches): Argentina 4 points, Chile 3, Uruguay 1, Canada 0.
  - Group B:
    - **Cuba** 32–25 ~~Greenland~~
    - **Brazil** 30–17 ~~Dominican Republic~~
      - Standings (after 2 matches): Cuba, Brazil 4 points, Greenland, Dominican Republic 0.

==== Rugby union ====
- Mid-year Tests:
  - Week 5: New Zealand Māori XV 35–28 England XV

==== Tennis ====
- Grand Slams:
  - Wimbledon Championships in Wimbledon, London, United Kingdom:
    - Men's singles, first round:
      - Nicolas Mahut (FRA) vs. John Isner (USA) [23] 4–6, 6–3, 7–6(7), 6–7(3), 59–59 (play suspended)
        - In the longest professional tennis match in history, Mahut and Isner are prevented from completing their match for a second consecutive day, due to fading light, after almost 10 hours of play.
    - Men's singles, second round:
      - **Roger Federer** (SUI) [1] def. Ilija Bozoljac (SRB) 6–3, 6–7(4), 6–4, 7–6(5)
      - **Novak Djokovic** (SRB) [3] def. Taylor Dent (USA) 7–6(5), 6–1, 6–4
      - **Andy Roddick** (USA) [5] def. Michaël Llodra (FRA) 4–6, 6–4, 6–1, 7–6(2)
      - **Daniel Brands** (GER) def. Nikolay Davydenko (RUS) [7] 1–6, 7–6(5), 7–6(8), 6–1
    - Women's singles, second round:
      - **Venus Williams** (USA) [2] def. Ekaterina Makarova (RUS) 6–0, 6–4
      - **Jelena Janković** (SRB) [4] def. Aleksandra Wozniak (CAN) 4–6, 6–2, 6–4
      - **Kim Clijsters** (BEL) [8] def. Karolina Šprem (CRO) 6–3, 6–2

=== June 22, 2010 (Tuesday) ===
==== Cricket ====
- South Africa in West Indies:
  - 2nd Test in Basseterre, St Kitts, Day 5:
    - South Africa 543/6d (147 overs) and 235/3d (94 overs); West Indies 546 (181.1 overs). **Match drawn; South Africa lead 3-match series 1–0.**
- Asia Cup in Dambulla, Sri Lanka:
  - Group stage: (teams in **bold** advance to final)
    - **India** 209 (42.3 overs); **Sri Lanka** 211/3 (37.3 overs). **Sri Lanka win by 7 wickets.**
      - Final standings: Sri Lanka 14 points, India 9, Pakistan 5, Bangladesh 0.
- Australia in England:
  - 1st ODI in Southampton:
    - Australia 267/7 (50 overs); England 268/6 (46 overs; Eoin Morgan 103*). **England win by 4 wickets; lead 5-match series 1–0.**

==== Football (soccer) ====
- FIFA World Cup in South Africa: (teams in **bold** advance to the round of 16)
  - Group A:
    - In Rustenburg: **Mexico** 0–1 **Uruguay**
    - In Bloemfontein: France 1–2 South Africa
      - Final standings: Uruguay 7 points, Mexico, South Africa 4, France 1.
      - South Africa become the first World Cup host team to fail to advance past the opening round.
  - Group B:
    - In Durban: Nigeria 2–2 **South Korea**
    - In Polokwane: Greece 0–2 **Argentina**
      - Final standings: Argentina 9 points, Korea Republic 4, Greece 3, Nigeria 1.
- 2011 FIFA Women's World Cup qualification (UEFA): (teams in ~~strike~~ are eliminated)
  - Group 1: Iceland 3–0 ~~Croatia~~
    - Standings: France 21 points (7 matches), Iceland 21 (8), ~~Estonia~~ 9 (6), ~~Serbia~~ 7 (7), ~~Northern Ireland~~ 3 (6), Croatia 1 (8)
- UEFA U-17 Women's Championship:
  - Semifinals:
    - Netherlands 0–3 **Spain**
    - **Republic of Ireland** 1–0 Germany

==== Handball ====
- American Men's Handball Championship in Santiago, Chile:
  - Group A:
    - Argentina 32–14 Uruguay
    - Canada 25–36 Chile
  - Group B:
    - Brazil 29–23 Greenland
    - Cuba 35–19 Dominican Republic

==== Tennis ====
- Grand Slams:
  - Wimbledon Championships in Wimbledon, London, United Kingdom:
    - Men's singles, first round:
      - **Rafael Nadal** (ESP) [2] def. Kei Nishikori (JPN) 6–2, 6–4, 6–4
      - **Andy Murray** (GBR) [4] def. Jan Hájek (CZE) 7–5, 6–1, 6–2
      - **Robin Söderling** (SWE) [6] def. Robby Ginepri (USA) 6–2, 6–2, 6–3
      - **Fabio Fognini** (ITA) def. Fernando Verdasco (ESP) [8] 7–6(9), 6–2, 6–7(6), 6–4
      - **David Ferrer** (ESP) [9] def. Nicolas Kiefer (GER) 6–4, 6–2, 6–3
      - **Jo-Wilfried Tsonga** (FRA) [10] def. Robert Kendrick (USA) 7–6(2), 7–6(6), 3–6, 6–4
    - Women's singles, first round:
      - **Serena Williams** (USA) [1] def. Michelle Larcher de Brito (POR) 6–0, 6–4
      - **Caroline Wozniacki** (DEN) [3] def. Tathiana Garbin (ITA) 6–1, 6–1
      - **Kaia Kanepi** (EST) def. Samantha Stosur (AUS) [6] 6–4, 6–4
      - **Agnieszka Radwańska** (POL) [7] def. Melinda Czink (HUN) 6–3, 6–3
      - **Li Na** (CHN) [9] def. Chanelle Scheepers (RSA) 7–6(5), 6–2
      - **Flavia Pennetta** (ITA) [10] def. Anabel Medina Garrigues (ESP) 6–4, 6–0

==== Volleyball ====
- Women's Pan-American Cup in Rosarito and Tijuana, Mexico: (teams in **bold** advance to the semifinals; teams in italic advance to the quarterfinals playoffs)
  - Group A:
    - Dominican Republic 3–1 Canada
    - **Cuba** 3–1 Argentina
      - Final standings: Cuba 8 points, Dominican Republic 7, Argentina 6, Brazil 5, Canada 4.
  - Group B:
    - Costa Rica 0–3 Peru
    - Puerto Rico 3–0 Trinidad and Tobago
    - **United States** 3–0 Mexico
      - Final standings: United States 10 points, Peru 9, Puerto Rico 8, Trinidad and Tobago 7, Mexico 6, Costa Rica 5.

=== June 21, 2010 (Monday) ===
==== Cricket ====
- South Africa in West Indies:
  - 2nd Test in Basseterre, St Kitts, Day 4:
    - South Africa 543/6d (147 overs) and 23/0 (11 overs); West Indies 546 (181.1 overs; Shivnarine Chanderpaul 166). South Africa lead by 20 runs with 10 wickets remaining.
      - During the West Indies innings, Mark Boucher became the first wicket-keeper to reach 500 Test dismissals in a career.
- Asia Cup in Dambulla, Sri Lanka:
  - Group stage: (teams in **bold** advance to final, teams in ~~strike~~ are eliminated)
    - ~~Pakistan~~ 385/7 (50 overs; Shahid Afridi 124); ~~Bangladesh~~ 246/5 (50 overs). **Pakistan win by 139 runs.**
      - Standings: **Sri Lanka**, **India** 9 points (2 matches), Pakistan 5 (3), Bangladesh 0 (3).

==== Football (soccer) ====
- FIFA World Cup in South Africa: (team in **bold** advances to the round of 16, team in ~~strike~~ is eliminated)
  - Group G in Cape Town: Portugal 7–0 ~~North Korea~~
    - Standings (after 2 matches): **Brazil** 6 points, Portugal 4, Ivory Coast 1, Korea DPR 0.
  - Group H:
    - In Port Elizabeth: Chile 1–0 Switzerland
      - Switzerland set a World Cup finals record for the longest consecutive streak without conceding a goal, with the streak being ended at 559 minutes.
    - In Johannesburg: Spain 2–0 Honduras
      - Standings (after 2 matches): Chile 6 points, Spain, Switzerland 3, Honduras 0.

==== Rugby union ====
- IRB Junior World Championship
  - 3rd place play-off: England 22–27 (bronze) South Africa
  - Final: (silver) Australia 17–62 (gold) New Zealand
    - New Zealand win the Championship for the third consecutive time.

==== Tennis ====
- Grand Slams:
  - Wimbledon Championships in Wimbledon, London, United Kingdom:
    - Men's singles, first round:
      - **Roger Federer** (SUI) [1] def. Alejandro Falla (COL) 5–7, 4–6, 6–4, 7–6(1), 6–0
      - **Novak Djokovic** (SRB) [3] def. Olivier Rochus (BEL) 4–6, 6–2, 3–6, 6–4, 6–2
      - **Andy Roddick** (USA) [5] def. Rajeev Ram (USA) 6–3, 6–2, 6–2
      - **Nikolay Davydenko** (RUS) [7] def. Kevin Anderson (RSA) 3–6, 6–7(3), 7–6(3), 7–5, 9–7
    - Women's singles, first round:
      - **Venus Williams** (USA) [2] def. Rossana de los Ríos (PAR) 6–3, 6–2
      - **Jelena Janković** (SRB) [4] def. Laura Robson (GBR) 6–3, 7–6(5)
      - **Vera Dushevina** (RUS) def. Francesca Schiavone (ITA) [5] 6–7(0), 7–5, 6–1
      - **Kim Clijsters** (BEL) [8] def. Maria Elena Camerin (ITA) 6–0, 6–3

==== Volleyball ====
- Women's Pan-American Cup in Rosarito and Tijuana, Mexico:
  - Group A:
    - Canada 0–3 Brazil
    - Argentina 1–3 Dominican Republic
      - Standings: Cuba 6 points (3 matches), Dominican Republic, Argentina 5 (3), Brazil 5 (4), Canada 3 (3).
  - Group B:
    - Trinidad and Tobago 0–3 Peru
    - United States 3–0 Costa Rica
    - Mexico 0–3 Puerto Rico
      - Standings (after 4 matches): United States 8 points, Peru 7, Puerto Rico, Trinidad and Tobago 6, Mexico 5, Costa Rica 4.

=== June 20, 2010 (Sunday) ===
==== Athletics ====
- European Team Championships Super League in Bergen, Norway
  - Final standings: (1) Russia 379.5 points (2) United Kingdom 317 (3) Germany 304.5

==== Auto racing ====
- NASCAR Sprint Cup Series:
  - Toyota/Save Mart 350 in Sonoma, California:
    - (1) (California) Jimmie Johnson (Chevrolet; Hendrick Motorsports) (2) (California) Robby Gordon (Toyota; Robby Gordon Motorsports) (3) (California) Kevin Harvick (Chevrolet; Richard Childress Racing)
      - Drivers' championship standings (after 16 of 36 races): (1) Harvick 2334 points (2) Johnson 2194 (3) (Nevada) Kyle Busch (Toyota; Joe Gibbs Racing) 2193
- IndyCar Series:
  - Iowa Corn Indy 250 in Newton, Iowa:
    - (1) Tony Kanaan (BRA) (Andretti Autosport) (2) Hélio Castroneves (BRA) (Team Penske) (3) E. J. Viso (VEN) (KV Racing Technology)
      - Drivers' championship standings (after 8 of 17 races): (1) Will Power (AUS) (Team Penske) 274 points (2) Scott Dixon (NZL) (Chip Ganassi Racing) 263 (3) Dario Franchitti (GBR) (Chip Ganassi Racing) 260
- V8 Supercars:
  - Skycity Triple Crown in Hidden Valley Raceway, Darwin, Northern Territory
    - Race 14: (1) Jamie Whincup (AUS) (Holden Commodore) (2) Mark Winterbottom (AUS) (Ford Falcon) (3) Shane van Gisbergen (NZL) (Ford Falcon)
      - Drivers' championship standings (after 14 of 26 races): (1) James Courtney (AUS) (Ford Falcon) 1698 points (2) Whincup 1641 (3) Craig Lowndes (AUS) (Holden Commodore) 1452
- World Touring Car Championship:
  - Race of Belgium:
    - Round 7: (1) Gabriele Tarquini (ITA) (SR-Sport; SEAT León) (2) Yvan Muller (FRA) (Chevrolet; Chevrolet Cruze) (3) Alain Menu (CZE) (Chevrolet; Chevrolet Cruze)
    - Round 8: (1) Andy Priaulx (GBR) (BMW Team RBM; BMW 320si) (2) Rob Huff (GBR) (Chevrolet; Chevrolet Cruze) (3) Tiago Monteiro (POR) (SR-Sport; SEAT León)
      - Drivers' championship standings (after 8 of 22 rounds): (1) Muller 128 points (2) Tarquini 109 (3) Priaulx 105
      - Manufacturers' championship standings: (1) Chevrolet 256 points (2) SEAT Customers Technology 239 (3) BMW 209

==== Cricket ====
- South Africa in West Indies:
  - 2nd Test in Basseterre, St Kitts, Day 3:
    - South Africa 543/6d (147 overs); West Indies 424/4 (116 overs; Shivnarine Chanderpaul 151*, Brendan Nash 114). West Indies trail by 119 runs with 6 wickets remaining in the 1st innings.

==== Cycling ====
- UCI ProTour:
  - Tour de Suisse:
    - Stage 9: (gold) Tony Martin (GER) (Team HTC–Columbia) 32' 21" (silver) Fabian Cancellara (SUI) (Team Saxo Bank) + 17" (bronze) David Zabriskie (USA) (Garmin–Transitions) + 29"
      - Final general classification: (1) Fränk Schleck (LUX) (Team Saxo Bank) 35h 02' 00" (2) Lance Armstrong (USA) (Team RadioShack) + 12" (3) Jakob Fuglsang (DEN) (Team Saxo Bank) + 17"

==== Equestrianism ====
- Show jumping:
  - FEI Nations Cup Promotional League:
    - FEI Nations Cup of Finland in Ypäjä (CSIO 3*): (gold) Ireland (Joan Greene on Biscaya Déversem, Edward Little on Kalvinretto, Alexander Butler on Will Wimble, Tholm Keane on Warrenstown You 2) (silver) Belgium (Philippe Le Jeune on Boyente de Muze, Evelyne Blaton on Haruba, Cindy van der Straten on Luxana-H, Gudrun Patteet on Carlino G) (bronze) Denmark (Karina Skou Truelsen on Lord if de Chalousse, Rikke Haastrup on Luganer, Torben Frandsen on Alcamo Vogt, Thomas Sandgaard on Rubber Ball)
      - Standings (after 8 of 11 competitions): (1) Belgium 49 points, (2) Italy 47, (3) Australia 25
  - Longines Grand Prix Port of Rotterdam in Rotterdam: (gold) Rolf-Göran Bengtsson (SWE) on Casall (silver) Pénélope Leprevost (FRA) on Mylord Carthago (bronze) Laura Kraut (USA) on Cedric (bronze) Carsten-Otto Nagel (GER) on Corradina
- Eventing:
  - Luhmühlen Horse Trials (CCI 4*): (gold) Sharon Hunt (GBR) on Tankers Town (silver) Ingrid Klimke (GER) on FRH Butts Abraxxas (bronze) Andreas Dibowski (GER) on FRH Fantasia

==== Football (soccer) ====
- FIFA World Cup in South Africa: (team in **bold** advances to the round of 16)
  - Group F:
    - Slovakia 0–2 Paraguay
    - Italy 1–1 New Zealand
      - Standings (after 2 matches): Paraguay 4 points, Italy, New Zealand 2, Slovakia 1.
  - Group G: **Brazil** 3–1 Ivory Coast
    - Standings: Brazil 6 points (2 matches), Portugal 1 (1), Côte d'Ivoire 1 (2), North Korea 0 (1).
- 2011 FIFA Women's World Cup qualification (UEFA):
  - Group 1: France 3–0 ~~Croatia~~
    - Standings: France 21 points (7 matches), Iceland 18 (7), Estonia 9 (6), ~~Serbia~~ 7 (7), ~~Northern Ireland~~ 3 (6), Croatia 1 (7)

==== Golf ====
- Men's majors:
  - U.S. Open in Pebble Beach, California, United States:
    - (1) Graeme McDowell (NIR) 284 (E) (2) Grégory Havret (FRA) 285 (+1) (3) Ernie Els (RSA) 286 (+2)
      - McDowell wins his first major, becoming the first golfer from Northern Ireland to win a major since Fred Daly won the 1947 Open Championship and the first European to win the U.S. Open since Tony Jacklin in 1970.
- European Tour:
  - Saint-Omer Open in France:
    - Winner: Martin Wiegele (AUT) 277 (−7)
      - Wiegele wins his first European Tour title.
- LPGA Tour:
  - ShopRite LPGA Classic in Galloway, New Jersey:
    - Winner: Ai Miyazato (JPN) 197 (−16)
      - Miyazato wins her fifth LPGA Tour title.

==== Motorcycle racing ====
- Moto GP:
  - British motorcycle Grand Prix in Northamptonshire, United Kingdom:
    - MotoGP: (1) Jorge Lorenzo (ESP) (Yamaha) (2) Andrea Dovizioso (ITA) (Honda) (3) Ben Spies (USA) (Yamaha)
      - Riders' championship standings (after 5 of 18 rounds): (1) Lorenzo 115 points (2) Dovizioso 78 (3) Dani Pedrosa (ESP) (Honda) 73
      - Manufacturers' championship standings: (1) Yamaha 120 points (2) Honda 97 (3) Ducati 65
    - Moto2: (1) Jules Cluzel (FRA) (Suter) (2) Thomas Lüthi (SUI) (Moriwaki) (3) Julián Simón (ESP) (Suter)
      - Riders' championship standings (after 5 of 17 rounds): (1) Toni Elías (ESP) (Moriwaki) 80 points (2) Shoya Tomizawa (JPN) (Suter) 65 (3) Lüthi 58
      - Manufacturers' championship standings: (1) Suter 100 points (2) Moriwaki 96 (3) Speed Up 56
    - 125cc: (1) Marc Márquez (ESP) (Derbi) (2) Pol Espargaró (ESP) (Derbi) (3) Bradley Smith (GBR) (Aprilia)
      - Riders' championship standings (after 5 of 17 rounds): (1) Espargaró 99 points (2) Nicolás Terol (ESP) (Aprilia) 98 (3) Márquez 82
      - Manufacturers' championship standings: (1) Derbi 120 points (2) Aprilia 101 (3) Honda 7

==== Rugby union ====
- IRB Nations Cup in Bucharest:
  - Georgia 16–21 Namibia
  - Argentina XV 33–13 Scotland A
  - Italy A 22–27 Romania
    - Final standings: Namibia 12 points, Romania, Italy A 9, Argentina Jaguars, Georgia 5, Scotland A 2.
      - Namibia win the Cup for the first time.

==== Volleyball ====
- FIVB World League, Week 3:
  - Pool A: Netherlands 0–3 Bulgaria
    - Standings (after 6 matches): Brazil 14 points, Bulgaria 13, Netherlands 9, South Korea 0.
  - Pool B: Italy 3–2 Serbia
    - Standings (after 6 matches): Serbia 15 points, Italy 14, France 4, China 3.
- Men's European League, Week 3:
  - Pool A:
    - Slovakia 0–3 Spain
    - Great Britain 2–3 Romania
      - Standings (after 6 matches): Romania 10 points, Great Britain, Spain 9, Slovakia 8.
- Women's European League, Week 3:
  - Pool A:
    - Great Britain 0–3 Bulgaria
    - Serbia 3–0 Romania
      - Standings: Bulgaria, Serbia 8 points (4 matches), Romania 8 (6), Great Britain 6 (6).
- Women's Pan-American Cup in Rosarito and Tijuana, Mexico:
  - Group A:
    - Brazil 0–3 Argentina
    - Dominican Republic 2–3 Cuba
      - Standings: Cuba 6 points (3 matches), Argentina 4 (2), Dominican Republic 3 (2), Brazil 3 (3), Canada 2 (2).
  - Group B:
    - Puerto Rico 0–3 Peru
    - United States 3–0 Trinidad and Tobago
    - Costa Rica 1–3 Mexico
      - Standings (after 3 matches): United States 6 points, Peru, Trinidad and Tobago 5, Puerto Rico, Mexico 4, Costa Rica 3.

=== June 19, 2010 (Saturday) ===
==== Athletics ====
- European Team Championships Super League in Bergen, Norway:
  - Standings after day 1: (1) Russia 209 points (2) United Kingdom 188 (3) Italy 160.5

==== Auto racing ====
- Nationwide Series:
  - Bucyrus 200 presented by Menards in Elkhart Lake, Wisconsin:
    - (1) (Missouri) Carl Edwards (Ford; Roush Fenway Racing) (2) (Canada) Ron Fellows (Chevrolet; JR Motorsports) (3) (Nevada) Brendan Gaughan (Toyota; Rusty Wallace Racing)
      - Drivers' championship standings (after 15 of 35 races): (1) (Michigan) Brad Keselowski (Dodge, Penske Racing) 2466 points (2) Edwards 2229 (3) (Illinois) Justin Allgaier (Dodge, Penske Racing) 2051
- V8 Supercars:
  - Skycity Triple Crown in Hidden Valley Raceway, Darwin, Northern Territory
    - Race 13: (1) Mark Winterbottom (AUS) (Ford Falcon) (2) Jamie Whincup (AUS) (Holden Commodore) (3) Shane van Gisbergen (NZL) (Ford Falcon)
      - Drivers' championship standings (after 13 of 26 races): (1) James Courtney (AUS) (Ford Falcon) 1578 points (2) Whincup 1491 (3) Craig Lowndes (AUS) (Holden Commodore) 1341

==== Basketball ====
- (Italy) Serie A Finals (best-of-7 series):
  - Game 4: Armani Jeans Milano 69–93 Montepaschi Siena. **Siena win series 4–0.**
    - Siena win the championship for the fourth successive time, and fifth overall.

==== Cricket ====
- South Africa in West Indies:
  - 2nd Test in Basseterre, St Kitts, Day 2:
    - South Africa 543/6d (147 overs; AB de Villiers 135*, Jacques Kallis 110); West Indies 86/1 (23.2 overs). West Indies trail by 457 runs with 9 wickets remaining in the 1st innings.
- Asia Cup in Dambulla, Sri Lanka:
  - Group stage: (teams in **bold** advance to final, teams in ~~strike~~ are eliminated)
    - ~~Pakistan~~ 267 (49.3 overs); **India** 271/7 (49.5 overs). **India win by 3 wickets.**
      - Standings (after 2 matches): **Sri Lanka**, India 9 points, Pakistan, ~~Bangladesh~~ 0.
- England in Scotland:
  - Only ODI in Edinburgh:
    - Scotland 211 (49.5 overs); England 213/3 (33.4 overs). **England win by 7 wickets.**

==== Cycling ====
- UCI ProTour:
  - Tour de Suisse:
    - Stage 8: (gold) Rui Costa (POR) (Caisse d'Epargne) 4h 10' 32" (silver) José Joaquín Rojas (ESP) (Caisse d'Epargne) + 15" (bronze) Maxime Monfort (BEL) (Team HTC–Columbia) + 19"
      - General classification: (1) Robert Gesink (NED) (Rabobank) 34h 27' 47" (2) Rigoberto Urán (COL) (Caisse d'Epargne) + 29" (3) Steve Morabito (SUI) (BMC Racing Team) + 36"

==== Equestrianism ====
- Dressage:
  - Grand Prix Freestyle in Rotterdam (CDIO 5*): (gold) Edward Gal (NED) on Moorlands Totilas (silver) Adelinde Cornelissen (NED) on Jerich Parzival (bronze) Imke Schellekens-Bartels (NED) on Hunter Douglas Sunrise

==== Football (soccer) ====
- FIFA World Cup in South Africa: (team in **bold** advances to the round of 16, team in ~~strike~~ is eliminated)
  - Group D in Rustenburg: Ghana 1–1 Australia
    - Standings (after 2 matches): Ghana 4 points, Germany, Serbia 3, Australia 1.
  - Group E:
    - In Durban: **Netherlands** 1–0 Japan
    - In Pretoria: ~~Cameroon~~ 1–2 Denmark
      - Standings (after 2 matches): Netherlands 6 points, Japan 3, Denmark 3, Cameroon 0.
- 2011 FIFA Women's World Cup qualification (UEFA): (teams in ~~strike~~ are eliminated)
  - Group 1:
    - Estonia 1–0 ~~Serbia~~
    - Iceland 2–0 ~~Northern Ireland~~
      - Standings: France 18 points (6 matches), Iceland 18 (7), Estonia 9 (6), Serbia 7 (7), Northern Ireland 3 (6), ~~Croatia~~ 1 (6)
  - Group 2:
    - Netherlands 2–2 Norway
    - ~~Slovakia~~ 0–2 Belarus
      - Standings: Netherlands 14 points (7 matches), Norway 13 (5), Belarus 10 (5), Slovakia 3 (5), ~~North Macedonia~~ 0 (6).
  - Group 3:
    - ~~Bulgaria~~ 0–5 Scotland
    - Denmark 7–0 ~~Greece~~
      - Standings: Denmark 16 points (6 matches), Scotland 15 (5), Greece 9 (6), Bulgaria 4 (6), ~~Georgia~~ 0 (7).
  - Group 4:
    - Poland 0–0 Hungary
    - ~~Bosnia and Herzegovina~~ 0–5 Ukraine
      - Standings: Poland 13 points (6 matches), Hungary 12 (7), Ukraine 10 (5), Romania 7 (5), Bosnia and Herzegovina 0 (7).
  - Group 5: Spain 2–2 England
    - Standings: England 16 points (6 matches), Spain 16 (7), ~~Austria~~, ~~Turkey~~ 6 (5), ~~Malta~~ 0 (7).
  - Group 6:
    - Russia 0–3 Switzerland
    - ~~Kazakhstan~~ 0–1 ~~Israel~~
      - Standings: Switzerland 15 points (6 matches), Russia 12 (5), ~~Republic of Ireland~~ 9 (6), Israel 6 (6), Kazakhstan 0 (5)
  - Group 7:
    - Finland 4–1 ~~Portugal~~
    - Italy 6–0 ~~Slovenia~~
      - Standings: Italy 19 points (7 matches), Finland 16 (6), Portugal, Slovenia 6 (6), ~~Armenia~~ 0 (7).
  - Group 8:
    - ~~Belgium~~ 11–0 ~~Azerbaijan~~
    - Sweden 0–0 Czech Republic
      - Standings: Sweden 13 points (5 matches), Czech Republic 10 (6), Belgium 10 (8), ~~Wales~~ 6 (6), Azerbaijan 4 (5).

==== Golf ====
- Men's majors:
  - U.S. Open in Pebble Beach, California, United States
    - Leaderboard after third round (USA unless stated): (1) Dustin Johnson 207 (−6) (2) Graeme McDowell (NIR) 210 (−3) (3) Tiger Woods 212 (−1)
- The Amateur Championship in Gullane, East Lothian, Scotland:
  - Final: **Jin Jeong** (KOR) def. James Byrne (SCO) 5 & 4.

==== Rugby union ====
- IRB Pacific Nations Cup:
  - Fiji 41–38 Tonga in Apia
  - Samoa 23–31 Japan in Apia
    - Standings (after 2 matches): Fiji 9 points, Japan, Samoa 4, Tonga 3.
- Mid-year Tests:
  - Week 4:
    - New Zealand 42–9 Wales in Dunedin
    - Australia 20–21 England in Sydney
    - South Africa 29–13 Italy in Witbank
    - Argentina 9–13 Scotland in Mar del Plata
- Churchill Cup in the United States:
  - Finals in Harrison, New Jersey:
    - Bowl: Uruguay 19–38 **Russia**
    - Plate: United States 10–24 **France A**
    - Cup: **England Saxons** 38–18 Canada
      - The Saxons win the Cup for the fifth time.

==== Tennis ====
- ATP World Tour:
  - UNICEF Open in 's-Hertogenbosch, Netherlands:
    - Final: **Sergiy Stakhovsky** (UKR) def. Janko Tipsarević (SRB) 6–3, 6–0
      - Stakhovsky wins the third title of his career.
  - Aegon International in Eastbourne, United Kingdom:
    - Final: **Michaël Llodra** (FRA) def. Guillermo García López (ESP) 7–5, 6–2
      - Llodra wins the fifth title of his career.
- WTA Tour:
  - UNICEF Open in 's-Hertogenbosch, Netherlands:
    - Final: **Justine Henin** (BEL) def. Andrea Petkovic (GER) 3–6, 6–3, 6–4
      - Henin wins the 43rd title of her career.
  - Aegon International in Eastbourne, United Kingdom:
    - Final: **Ekaterina Makarova** (RUS) def. Victoria Azarenka (BLR) 7–6(5), 6–4
      - Makarova wins the first title of her career.

==== Volleyball ====
- FIVB World League, Week 3: (teams in **bold** advance to final round)
  - Pool A:
    - Netherlands 0–3 Bulgaria
    - Brazil 3–0 South Korea
      - Standings: Brazil 14 points (6 matches), Bulgaria 10 (5), Netherlands 9 (5), South Korea 0 (6).
  - Pool B: France 1–3 China
    - Standings: Serbia 14 points (5 matches), Italy 12 (5), France 4 (6), China 3 (6).
  - Pool C:
    - Russia 3–1 Finland
    - United States 3–1 Egypt
      - Standings (after 6 matches): Russia 17 points, United States 12, Finland 4, Egypt 3.
  - Pool D:
    - **Argentina** 1–3 Germany
    - Cuba 0–3 Poland
      - Standings (after 6 matches): Cuba 13 points, Germany 12, Poland 9, Argentina 2.
- Men's European League, Week 3:
  - Pool A:
    - Slovakia 2–3 Spain
    - Great Britain 3–1 Romania
      - Standings (after 5 matches): Great Britain, Romania 8 points, Spain, Slovakia 7.
  - Pool B:
    - Austria 1–3 Portugal
    - Greece 3–0 Turkey
      - Standings (after 6 matches): Portugal 12 points, Turkey 9, Greece 8, Austria 7.
- Women's European League, Week 3:
  - Pool A:
    - Great Britain 0–3 Bulgaria
    - Serbia 3–0 Romania
      - Standings: Romania 7 points (5 matches), Serbia, Bulgaria 6 (3), Great Britain 5 (5).
  - Pool B:
    - Greece 0–3 Turkey
    - Spain 3–1 Israel
      - Standings (after 4 matches): Turkey 7 points, Israel, Spain 6, Greece 5.
- Women's Pan-American Cup in Rosarito and Tijuana, Mexico:
  - Group A:
    - Brazil 1–3 Dominican Republic
    - Cuba 3–1 Canada
      - Standings: Cuba 4 points (2 matches), Argentina, Dominican Republic 2 (1), Canada, Brazil 2 (2).
  - Group B:
    - United States 3–0 Puerto Rico
    - Costa Rica 0–3 Trinidad and Tobago
    - Peru 3–0 Mexico
      - Standings (after 2 matches): United States, Trinidad and Tobago 4 points, Peru, Puerto Rico 3, Costa Rica, Mexico 2.

=== June 18, 2010 (Friday) ===
==== Cricket ====
- South Africa in West Indies:
  - 2nd Test in Basseterre, St Kitts, Day 1:
    - South Africa 296/3 (86 overs; Graeme Smith 132); West Indies.
- Asia Cup in Dambulla, Sri Lanka:
  - Group stage:
    - Sri Lanka 312/4 (50 overs); Bangladesh 186 (40.2 overs). **Sri Lanka win by 126 runs.**
      - Standings: Sri Lanka 9 points (2 matches), India 5 (1), Pakistan 0 (1), Bangladesh 0 (2).

==== Cycling ====
- UCI ProTour:
  - Tour de Suisse:
    - Stage 7: (gold) Marcus Burghardt (GER) (BMC Racing Team) 4h 52' 02" (silver) Óscar Freire (ESP) (Rabobank) + 1' 01" (bronze) Greg Van Avermaet (BEL) (Omega Pharma–Lotto) + 1' 01"
      - General classification: (1) Robert Gesink (NED) (Rabobank) 30h 15' 59" (2) Rigoberto Urán (COL) (Caisse d'Epargne) + 29" (3) Steve Morabito (SUI) (BMC Racing Team) + 36"

==== Equestrianism ====
- Show jumping
  - Meydan FEI Nations Cup:
    - FEI Nations Cup of the Netherlands in Rotterdam (CSIO 5*): (gold) United States (Lauren Hough on Quick Study, Candice King on Skara Glen's Davos, Nicole Shahinian Simpson on Tristan, Laura Kraut on Cedric) (silver) United Kingdom (Peter Charles on Pom d'Ami, David McPherson on Chamberlain Z, Scott Brash on Intertoy Z, John Whitaker on Peppermill) (bronze) Netherlands (Vincent Voorn on Alpapillon-Armanie, Eric van der Vleuten on Utascha SFN, Harrie Smolders on Walnut de Muze, Marc Houtzager on Tamino)
      - Standings (after 4 of 8 competitions): (1) France 33.5 points (2) United Kingdom 25.5 (3) United States 22

==== Football (soccer) ====
- FIFA World Cup in South Africa:
  - Group C:
    - In Johannesburg: Slovenia 2–2 United States
    - In Cape Town: England 0–0 Algeria
      - Standings (after 2 matches): Slovenia 4 points, United States, England 2, Algeria 1.
  - Group D in Port Elizabeth: Germany 0–1 Serbia
    - Standings: Germany 3 points (2 matches), Ghana 3 (1), Serbia 3 (2), Australia 0 (1).

==== Golf ====
- Men's majors:
  - U.S. Open in Pebble Beach, California, United States
    - Leaderboard after second round (USA unless stated): (1) Graeme McDowell (NIR) 139 (−3) (2) Ernie Els (RSA), Dustin Johnson, Ryo Ishikawa (JPN) and Phil Mickelson 141 (−1)

==== Rugby union ====
- Mid-year Tests:
  - Week 4:
    - New Zealand Māori 31–28 Ireland XV

==== Volleyball ====
- FIVB World League, Week 3: (teams in **bold** advance to final round)
  - Pool A: Brazil 3–1 South Korea
    - Standings: Brazil 11 points (5 matches), Netherlands 9 (4), Bulgaria 7 (4), South Korea 0 (5).
  - Pool B:
    - Italy 2–3 Serbia
    - France 3–0 China
      - Standings (after 5 matches): Serbia 14 points, Italy 12, France 4, China 0.
  - Pool C:
    - Russia 3–0 Finland
    - United States 3–1 Egypt
      - Standings (after 5 matches): Russia 14 points, United States 9, Finland 4, Egypt 3.
  - Pool D:
    - **Argentina** 0–3 Germany
    - Cuba 3–2 Poland
      - Standings (after 5 matches): Cuba 13 points, Germany 9, Poland 6, Argentina 2.
- Men's European League, Week 3:
  - Pool B:
    - Austria 0–3 Portugal
    - Greece 0–3 Turkey
      - Standings (after 5 matches): Portugal 10 points, Turkey 8, Greece, Austria 6.
- Women's European League, Week 3:
  - Pool B:
    - Greece 3–2 Turkey
    - Spain 3–2 Israel
      - Standings (after 3 matches): Israel, Turkey 5 points, Spain, Greece 4.
- Women's Pan-American Cup in Rosarito and Tijuana, Mexico:
  - Group A:
    - Canada 2–3 Argentina
    - Cuba 3–1 Brazil
  - Group B:
    - Peru 0–3 United States
    - Puerto Rico 3–0 Costa Rica
    - Mexico 0–3 Trinidad and Tobago

=== June 17, 2010 (Thursday) ===
==== Basketball ====
- (United States) NBA Finals (best-of-7 series):
  - Game 7: Los Angeles Lakers 83, Boston Celtics 79. **Lakers win series 4–3.**
    - The Lakers win the championship for the second straight time and 16th overall.
    - Kobe Bryant is named as the Finals MVP for the second straight time.
- (Germany) Basketball Bundesliga Finals (best-of-5 series):
  - Game 5: Brose Baskets Bamberg 72–70 Deutsche Bank Skyliners. **Bamberg win series 3–2.**
    - Bamberg win the championship for the third time.
- (Italy) Serie A Finals (best-of-7 series):
  - Game 3: Armani Jeans Milano 75–88 Montepaschi Siena. Siena lead series 3–0.

==== Cricket ====
- Australia in Ireland:
  - Only ODI in Dublin:
    - Australia 231/9 (50 overs); Ireland 192 (42 overs). **Australia win by 39 runs.**

==== Cycling ====
- UCI ProTour:
  - Tour de Suisse:
    - Stage 6: (gold) Robert Gesink (NED) (Rabobank) 6h 20' 53" (silver) Rigoberto Urán (COL) (Caisse d'Epargne) + 42" (bronze) Joaquim Rodríguez (ESP) (Team Katusha) + 42"
      - General classification: (1) Gesink 25h 18' 57" (2) Urán + 29" (3) Steve Morabito (SUI) (BMC Racing Team) + 36"

==== Equestrianism ====
- Dressage:
  - Nations Cup of the Netherlands in Rotterdam (CDIO 5*): (gold) Netherlands (Hans Peter Minderhoud on Nadine, Imke Schellekens-Bartels on Sunrise, Adelinde Cornelissen on Parzival, Edward Gal on Totilas) (silver) Germany (Hubertus Schmidt on Donnelly, Christoph Koschel on Donnperignon, Monica Theodorescu on Whisper, Matthias-Alexander Rath on Sterntaler-UNICEF) (bronze) Canada (Ashley Holzer on Pop Art, Belinda Trussell on Anton, Bonny Bonnello on Pikardi, Shannon Dueck on Ayscha)

==== Football (soccer) ====
- FIFA World Cup in South Africa:
  - Group A in Polokwane: France 0–2 Mexico
    - Standings (after 2 matches): Uruguay, Mexico 4 points, France, South Africa 1.
  - Group B:
    - In Johannesburg: Argentina 4–1 South Korea
      - Gonzalo Higuaín scores the first hat-trick of the tournament.
    - In Bloemfontein: Greece 2–1 Nigeria
      - Standings (after 2 matches): Argentina 6 points, Korea Republic, Greece 3, Nigeria 0.

==== Golf ====
- Men's majors:
  - U.S. Open in Pebble Beach, California:
    - Leaderboard after first round: (1) Shaun Micheel (USA), Paul Casey (ENG) and Brendon de Jonge (ZIM) 69 (−2)

==== Rugby union ====
- IRB Junior World Championship
  - Semifinals:
    - **Australia** 28–16 England
    - **New Zealand** 36–7 South Africa

==== U.S. college sports ====
- Conference realignment:
  - The University of Utah, currently a member of the Mountain West Conference, officially accepts an invitation to join the Pacific-10 Conference effective in 2011. The Utes are the second school that joins the Pac-10 this month after Colorado, and that increase the Pac-10 to 12 members, making it eligible for a Conference Championship Game. (AP via ESPN)

=== June 16, 2010 (Wednesday) ===
==== Cricket ====
- Asia Cup in Dambulla, Sri Lanka:
  - Group stage:
    - Bangladesh 167 (34.5 overs); India 168/4 (30.4 overs). **India win by 6 wickets.**
      - Standings (after 1 match): India 5 points, Sri Lanka 4, Pakistan, Bangladesh 0.

==== Cycling ====
- UCI ProTour:
  - Tour de Suisse:
    - Stage 5: (gold) Marcus Burghardt (GER) (BMC Racing Team) 4h 21' 23" (silver) Martijn Maaskant (NED) (Garmin–Transitions) + 2" (bronze) Daniel Oss (ITA) (Liquigas–Doimo) + 4"
      - General classification: (1) Tony Martin (GER) (Team HTC–Columbia) 18h 57' 47" (2) Fabian Cancellara (SUI) (Team Saxo Bank) + 1" (3) Thomas Löfkvist (SWE) (Team Sky) + 9"

==== Football (soccer) ====
- FIFA World Cup in South Africa:
  - Group A in Pretoria: South Africa 0–3 Uruguay
    - Standings: Uruguay 4 points (2 matches), Mexico, France 1 (1), South Africa 1 (2).
  - Group H:
    - In Nelspruit: Honduras 0–1 Chile
    - In Durban: Spain 0–1 Switzerland

=== June 15, 2010 (Tuesday) ===
==== Basketball ====
- (United States) NBA Finals (best-of-7 series):
  - Game 6: Los Angeles Lakers 89, Boston Celtics 67. Series tied 3–3.
- NBA news:
  - Michigan State coach Tom Izzo turns down a reported five-year, $30 million contract offer from the Cleveland Cavaliers. (AP via ESPN)
- (Spain) ACB Finals (best-of-5 series):
  - Game 3: Caja Laboral 79–78 (OT) Regal FC Barcelona. **Caja Laboral win series 3–0.**
    - Caja Laboral win the championship for the third time.
    - Tiago Splitter is named as MVP.
- (Germany) Basketball Bundesliga Finals (best-of-5 series):
  - Game 4: Deutsche Bank Skyliners 69–56 Brose Baskets Bamberg. Series tied 2–2.
- (Italy) Serie A Finals (best-of-7 series):
  - Game 2: Montepaschi Siena 81–59 Armani Jeans Milano. Siena lead series 2–0.

==== Cricket ====
- Asia Cup in Dambulla, Sri Lanka:
  - Group stage:
    - Sri Lanka 242/9 (50 overs); Pakistan 226 (47 overs; Shahid Afridi 109). **Sri Lanka win by 16 runs.**
- Scotland in Netherlands:
  - Only ODI in Hazelaarweg, Rotterdam:
    - Scotland 235/6 (50 overs); Netherlands 236/4 (49.2 overs). **Netherlands win by 6 wickets, win 1-match series 1–0.**

==== Cycling ====
- UCI ProTour:
  - Tour de Suisse:
    - Stage 4: (gold) Alessandro Petacchi (ITA) (Lampre–Farnese Vini) 4h 57' 33" (silver) Matti Breschel (DEN) (Team Saxo Bank) s.t. (bronze) Marco Marcato (ITA) (Vacansoleil) s.t.
      - General classification: (1) Tony Martin (GER) (Team HTC–Columbia) 14h 35' 37" (2) Fabian Cancellara (SUI) (Team Saxo Bank) + 1" (3) Thomas Löfkvist (SWE) (Team Sky) + 9"

==== Football (soccer) ====
- FIFA World Cup in South Africa:
  - Group F in Rustenburg: New Zealand 1–1 Slovakia
    - Standings (after 1 match): Paraguay, Italy, New Zealand, Slovakia 1 point.
  - Group G:
    - In Port Elizabeth: Ivory Coast 0–0 Portugal
    - In Johannesburg: Brazil 2–1 North Korea

==== Rugby union ====
- IRB Nations Cup in Bucharest:
  - Italy A 21–3 Georgia
  - Scotland A 20–23 Namibia
  - Romania 24–8 Argentina XV
    - Standings (after 2 matches): Italy A, Namibia 8 points, Romania 5, Georgia 4, Scotland A 2, Argentina Jaguars 1.

=== June 14, 2010 (Monday) ===
==== Cycling ====
- UCI ProTour:
  - Tour de Suisse:
    - Stage 3: (gold) Fränk Schleck (LUX) (Team Saxo Bank) 5h 02' 21" (silver) Rigoberto Urán (COL) (Caisse d'Epargne) s.t. (bronze) Bauke Mollema (NLD) (Rabobank) + 3"
      - General classification: (1) Tony Martin (GER) (Team HTC–Columbia) 9h 38' 04" (2) Fabian Cancellara (SUI) (Team Saxo Bank) + 1" (3) Thomas Löfkvist (SWE) (Team Sky) + 9"

==== Football (soccer) ====
- FIFA World Cup in South Africa:
  - Group E:
    - In Johannesburg: Netherlands 2–0 Denmark
    - In Bloemfontein: Japan 1–0 Cameroon
  - Group F in Cape Town: Italy 1–1 Paraguay

==== Golf ====
- LPGA Tour:
  - State Farm Classic in Springfield, Illinois:
    - Winner: Cristie Kerr (USA) 266 (−22)
      - Kerr wins her thirteenth LPGA Tour title.

==== U.S. college sports ====
- Conference realignment:
  - A last-minute deal leads the University of Texas to stay in a 10-team Big 12 Conference. Shortly after Texas' decision, Texas A&M, Texas Tech, Oklahoma, and Oklahoma State all decide to stay put in the Big 12. (ESPN)

=== June 13, 2010 (Sunday) ===
==== Auto racing ====
- Formula One:
  - Canadian Grand Prix in Montreal, Canada:
    - (1) Lewis Hamilton (GBR) (McLaren–Mercedes) (2) Jenson Button (GBR) (McLaren-Mercedes) (3) Fernando Alonso (ESP) (Ferrari)
      - Drivers' championship standings (after 8 of 19 races): (1) Hamilton 109 points (2) Button 106 (3) Mark Webber (AUS) (Red Bull–Renault) 103
      - Constructors' championship standings: (1) McLaren 215 points (2) Red Bull 193 (3) Ferrari 161
- NASCAR Sprint Cup Series:
  - Heluva Good! Sour Cream Dips 400 in Brooklyn, Michigan:
    - (1) (Virginia) Denny Hamlin (Toyota; Joe Gibbs Racing) (2) (Washington (state)) Kasey Kahne (Ford; Richard Petty Motorsports) (3) (Nevada) Kurt Busch (Dodge; Penske Racing)
      - Drivers' championship standings (after 15 of 36 races): (1) (California) Kevin Harvick (Chevrolet; Richard Childress Racing) 2169 points (2) (Nevada) Kyle Busch (Toyota; Joe Gibbs Racing) 2147 (3) Hamlin 2122
- 24 Hours of Le Mans in Le Mans, France:
  - (1) (Germany) #9 Audi Sport North America (Timo Bernhard (GER), Romain Dumas (FRA), Mike Rockenfeller (GER)) (2) (Germany) #8 Audi Sport Team Joest (Marcel Fässler (SUI), André Lotterer (GER), Benoît Tréluyer (FRA)) (3) (Germany) #7 Audi Sport Team Joest (Rinaldo Capello (ITA), Tom Kristensen (DEN), Allan McNish (GBR))

==== Basketball ====
- (United States) NBA Finals (best-of-7 series):
  - Game 5: Boston Celtics 92, Los Angeles Lakers 86. Celtics lead series 3–2.
- (Germany) Basketball Bundesliga Finals (best-of-5 series):
  - Game 3: Brose Baskets Bamberg 97–52 Deutsche Bank Skyliners. Bamberg lead series 2–1.
- (Italy) Serie A Finals (best-of-7 series):
  - Game 1: Montepaschi Siena 100–80 Armani Jeans Milano. Siena lead series 1–0.
- (France) Ligue Nationale de Basketball Final in Paris:
  - **Cholet** 81–65 Le Mans
    - Cholet win the championship for the first time.

==== Cricket ====
- South Africa in West Indies:
  - 1st Test in Kingston, Jamaica, Day 4:
    - South Africa 352 and 206/4d (62 overs); West Indies 102 (47.1 overs) and 293 (80.3 overs). **South Africa win by 163 runs; lead 3-match series 1–0.**
- India in Zimbabwe:
  - 2nd T20I in Harare:
    - Zimbabwe 140/5 (20 overs); India 144/3 (18 overs). **India win by 7 wickets; win 2-match series 2–0.**
- ICC Intercontinental Cup, Day 4:
  - Netherlands 210 (90 overs) and 257 (96.2 overs; Peter Borren 109); Scotland 391 (133.2 overs) and 77/6 (24.2 overs) in Deventer. **Scotland win by 4 wickets.**
    - Standings: Scotland 69 points (4 matches), Afghanistan 57 (4), Kenya 43 (5), Zimbabwe XI 23 (2), Netherlands 15 (4), Ireland 12 (3), Canada 9 (4).

==== Cycling ====
- UCI ProTour:
  - Critérium du Dauphiné:
    - Stage 7: (gold) Edvald Boasson Hagen (NOR) (Team Sky) 3h 39' 43" (silver) Arkaitz Durán (ESP) (Footon–Servetto–Fuji) + 27" (bronze) Egor Silin (RUS) (Team Katusha) + 32"
      - Final general classification: (1) Janez Brajkovič (SVN) (Team RadioShack) 28h 06' 28" (2) Alberto Contador (ESP) (Astana) + 1' 41" (3) Tejay van Garderen (USA) (Team HTC–Columbia) + 2' 41"
  - Tour de Suisse:
    - Stage 2: (gold) Heinrich Haussler (GER) (Cervélo TestTeam) 4h 25' 16" (silver) Pablo Urtasun (ESP) (Euskaltel–Euskadi) s.t. (bronze) Marco Marcato (ITA) (Vacansoleil) s.t.
      - General classification: (1) Fabian Cancellara (SUI) (Team Saxo Bank) 4h 35' 37" (2) Roman Kreuziger (CZE) (Liquigas–Doimo) + 1" (3) Tony Martin (GER) (Team HTC–Columbia) + 3"

==== Football (soccer) ====
- FIFA World Cup in South Africa:
  - Group C in Polokwane: Algeria 0–1 Slovenia
    - Standings (after 1 match): Slovenia 3 points, England, United States 1, Algeria 0.
  - Group D:
    - In Pretoria: Serbia 0–1 Ghana
    - In Durban: Germany 4–0 Australia

==== Golf ====
- PGA Tour:
  - St. Jude Classic in Memphis, Tennessee:
    - Winner: Lee Westwood (ENG) 270 (−10)^{PO}
      - Westwood wins his second PGA Tour title.
- European Tour:
  - Estoril Open de Portugal in Estoril, Portugal:
    - Winner: Thomas Bjørn (DEN) 265 (−23)
      - Bjørn wins his tenth European Tour title.
- LPGA Tour:
  - State Farm Classic in Springfield, Illinois: Play suspended due to storm threat; final round will resume June 14.
- Curtis Cup in Manchester-by-the-Sea, Massachusetts:
  - Team USA (United States) 12½–7½ (United Kingdom) (Republic of Ireland) Team Great Britain & Ireland
    - Team USA retains the trophy, extending its streak of wins in this competition to seven.

==== Rugby union ====
- IRB Junior World Championship in Argentina: (teams in **bold** advance to semi-finals)
  - Pool A:
    - **New Zealand** 43–10 Wales
    - Samoa 12–15 Fiji
      - Final standings: New Zealand 15 points, Wales 8, Fiji 4, Samoa 1.
  - Pool B:
    - **England** 17–9 France
    - Ireland 21–24 Argentina
      - Final standings: England 13 points, France 9, Argentina 4, Ireland 2.
  - Pool C:
    - Scotland 27–3 Tonga
    - **South Africa** 35–42 **Australia**
      - Final standings: Australia 15 points, South Africa 12, Scotland 4, Tonga 0.
- Churchill Cup in the United States:
  - Pool matches in Glendale, Colorado: (teams in **bold** advance to cup final, teams in italic advance to plate final, teams in ~~strike~~ advance to bowl final)
    - Pool A: France A 27–33 **Canada**
      - Final standings: Canada 9 points, France A 6, ~~Uruguay~~ 0.
    - Pool B: **England Saxons** 32–9 United States
      - Final standings: England Saxons 10 points, United States 5, ~~Russia~~ 0.

==== Tennis ====
- ATP World Tour:
  - Gerry Weber Open in Halle, Germany
    - Final: **Lleyton Hewitt** (AUS) def. Roger Federer (SUI) 3–6, 7–6(4), 6–4
      - Hewitt wins his 28th career title.
  - Aegon Championships in London, United Kingdom
    - Final: **Sam Querrey** (USA) def. Mardy Fish (USA) 7–6(3), 7–5
      - Querrey wins his fifth career title.
- WTA Tour:
  - Aegon Classic in Birmingham, United Kingdom
    - Final: **Li Na** (CHN) def. Maria Sharapova (RUS) 7–5, 6–1
      - Li wins her third career title.

==== Volleyball ====
- FIVB World League, Week 2:
  - Pool A:
    - South Korea 0–3 Bulgaria
    - Brazil 3–1 Netherlands
      - Standings (after 4 matches): Netherlands 9 points, Brazil 8, Bulgaria 7, South Korea 0.
  - Pool B: Italy 3–0 China
    - Standings (after 4 matches): Serbia 12 points, Italy 11, France 1, China 0.
- Men's European League, Week 2:
  - Pool B:
    - Portugal 3–2 Greece
    - Turkey 3–1 Austria
      - Standings (after 4 matches): Portugal 8 points, Turkey 6, Greece, Austria 5.
- Montreux Volley Masters:
  - 3rd place match: Russia 0–3 (bronze) Cuba
  - Final match: (gold) China 3–1 (silver) United States
    - China win the tournament for the fifth time.
- Asian Men's Club Championship:
  - 3rd place: Shanghai Oriental (China) 0–3 (bronze) (Japan) Panasonic Panthers
  - Final: (silver) Al-Arabi (Qatar) 1–3 (gold) (Iran) Paykan Tehran
    - Paykan win the title for the fifth consecutive time and sixth overall.

=== June 12, 2010 (Saturday) ===
==== Athletics ====
- IAAF Diamond League:
  - Adidas Grand Prix in New York City, United States:
    - Men:
      - 100 metres: Richard Thompson (TRI) 9.89
      - 800 metres: Mbulaeni Mulaudzi (RSA) 1:44.38
      - 1500 metres: Nicholas Kemboi (KEN) 3:33.29
      - 400 metres hurdles: Kerron Clement (USA) 47.86
      - 3000 metres steeplechase: Paul Kipsiele Koech (KEN) 8:10.43
      - Triple jump: Teddy Tamgho (FRA) 17.98 m
      - High jump: Linus Thörnblad (SWE) 2.30 m
      - Pole vault: Renaud Lavillenie (FRA) 5.70 m
      - Javelin throw: Andreas Thorkildsen (NOR) 87.02 m
    - Women:
      - 200 metres: Veronica Campbell Brown (JAM) 21.98
      - 800 metres: Laura Januszewski (USA) 2:03.39
      - 1500 metres: Nancy Langat (KEN) 4:01.60
      - 5000 metres: Tirunesh Dibaba (ETH) 15:11.34
      - 100 metres hurdles: Lolo Jones (USA) 12.55
      - Long jump: Brianna Glenn (USA) 6.78 m
      - Pole vault: Jillian Schwartz (ISR) 4.60 m
      - Shot put: Valerie Vili (NZL) 19.93 m
      - Discus throw: Sandra Perković (CRO) 61.96 m

==== Auto racing ====
- Nationwide Series:
  - Meijer 300 in Sparta, Kentucky: (1) (Connecticut) Joey Logano (Toyota, Joe Gibbs Racing) (2) (Missouri) Carl Edwards (Ford, Roush Fenway Racing) (3) (Michigan) Brad Keselowski (Dodge, Penske Racing)
    - Logano completes a hat-trick, as he wins his third consecutive race in Kentucky, all from the pole — the first time that any Nationwide Series driver has done so at any single track.
    - Drivers' championship standings (after 14 of 35 races): (1) Keselowski 2306 points (2) Edwards 2034 (3) (Illinois) Justin Allgaier (Dodge, Penske Racing) 1993

==== Basketball ====
- (Spain) ACB Finals (best-of-5 series):
  - Game 2: Regal FC Barcelona 69–70 Caja Laboral. Caja Laboral lead series 2–0.

==== Boxing ====
- European Men's Championships in Moscow, Russia:
  - Light flyweight: (gold) Paddy Barnes (IRL) (silver) Elvin Mamishzade (AZE) (bronze) Hovhannes Danielyan (ARM) (bronze) José Kelvin de la Nieve Linares (ESP)
  - Flyweight: (gold) Misha Aloyan (RUS) (silver) Khalid Saeed Yafai (ENG) (bronze) Vincenzo Picardi (ITA) (bronze) Ronny Beblik (GER)
  - Bantamweight: (gold) Eduard Abzalimov (RUS) (silver) Georgiy Chygayev (UKR) (bronze) Andrew Selby (WAL) (bronze) Gamal Yafai (ENG)
  - Featherweight: (gold) Denis Makarov (GER) (silver) Iain Weaver (ENG) (bronze) Sergey Kunitsyn (BLR) (bronze) Tyrone McCullough (IRL)
  - Lightweight: (gold) Albert Selimov (RUS) (silver) Thomas Stalker (ENG) (bronze) Eugen Burhard (GER) (bronze) Eric Donovan (IRL)
  - Light welterweight: (gold) Hrachik Javakhyan (ARM) (silver) Gyula Káté (HUN) (bronze) Alexander Solyannikov (RUS) (bronze) Oleksandr Klyuchko (UKR)
  - Welterweight: (gold) Balazs Bacskai (HUN) (silver) Alexis Vastine (FRA) (bronze) Magomed Nurutdinov (BLR) (bronze) Taras Shelestyuk (UKR)
  - Middleweight: (gold) Artem Chebotarev (RUS) (silver) Darren O'Neill (IRL) (bronze) Nikolay Veselov (BLR) (bronze) Mladen Manev (BUL)
  - Light heavyweight: (gold) Artur Beterbiyev (RUS) (silver) Abdelkader Bouhenia (FRA) (bronze) Artur Khachatryan (ARM) (bronze) Kenneth Egan (IRL)
  - Heavyweight: (gold) Egor Mekhontsev (RUS) (silver) Tervel Pulev (BUL) (bronze) Denis Poyatsika (UKR) (bronze) Jozsef Darmos (HUN)
  - Super heavyweight: (gold) Sergey Kuzmin (RUS) (silver) Viktar Zuyev (BLR) (bronze) Yousef Abdelghani (ISR) (bronze) Roman Kapitonenko (UKR)

==== Cricket ====
- South Africa in West Indies:
  - 1st Test in Kingston, Jamaica, Day 3:
    - South Africa 352 & 155/2 (43.3 overs); West Indies 102 (47.1 overs). South Africa lead by 405 runs with 8 wickets remaining.
- India in Zimbabwe:
  - 1st T20I in Harare:
    - Zimbabwe 111/9 (20 overs); India 112/4 (15 overs). **India win by 6 wickets; lead 2-match series 1–0.**
- ICC Intercontinental Cup, Day 3:
  - Netherlands 210 (90 overs) and 168/8 (69 overs); Scotland 391 (133.2 overs) in Deventer. Netherlands trail by 13 runs with 2 wickets remaining.

==== Cycling ====
- UCI ProTour:
  - Critérium du Dauphiné:
    - Stage 6: (gold) Alberto Contador (ESP) (Astana) 4h 31' 01" (silver) Janez Brajkovič (SLO) (Team RadioShack) s.t. (bronze) Sylwester Szmyd (POL) (Liquigas–Doimo) + 17"
      - General classification: (1) Brajkovič 24h 26' 05" (2) Contador + 1' 41" (3) Tejay van Garderen (USA) (Team HTC–Columbia) + 2' 41"
  - Tour de Suisse:
    - Stage 1: (gold) Fabian Cancellara (SUI) (Team Saxo Bank) 10' 21" (silver) Roman Kreuziger (CZE) (Liquigas–Doimo) + 1" (bronze) Tony Martin (GER) (Team HTC–Columbia) + 3"

==== Equestrianism ====
- Show jumping:
  - Global Champions Tour:
    - 4th Competition in Cannes: (gold) Edwina Alexander (AUS) on Itot du Chateau (silver) Kevin Staut (FRA) on Le Prestige St Lois (bronze) Jessica Kürten (IRL) on Libertina
      - Standings (after 4 of 9 competitions): (1) Marco Kutscher (GER) 138 points (2) Marcus Ehning (GER) 122 (3) Kürten 100
  - FEI Nations Cup of Poland in Sopot: (gold) Germany (Franz-Josef Dahlmann on Lifou, Sarah Nagel-Tornau on Udarco, Andre Thieme on Aragon Rouet, Felix Hassmann on Lianos) (silver) Italy (Lucia Vizzini on Quinta Roo, Emanuele Gaudiano on Chicago, Davide Kainich on Loro Piana JHG, Massimo Grossato on Lady Luna) (bronze) Hungary (Sándor Szász on Moosbachhofs Goldwing, Balázs Horváth on Santiago, Mariann Hugyecz on Cash, James Wingrave on Sissi)
    - Standings (after 7 of 11 competitions): (1) Belgium 47 points (2) Italy 47 (3) Australia 25

==== Football (soccer) ====
- FIFA World Cup in South Africa:
  - Group B:
    - In Port Elizabeth: South Korea 2–0 Greece
    - In Johannesburg: Argentina 1–0 Nigeria
  - Group C in Rustenburg: England 1–1 United States

==== Mixed martial arts ====
- UFC 115 in Vancouver:
  - Welterweight bout: Carlos Condit (USA) def. Rory MacDonald (CAN) by TKO (strikes)
  - Heavyweight bout: Ben Rothwell (USA) def. Gilbert Yvel (NLD) by unanimous decision (30–27, 29–28, 29–28)
  - Welterweight bout: Martin Kampmann (DEN) def. Paulo Thiago (BRA) by unanimous decision (30–27, 30–27, 30–27)
  - Heavyweight bout: Mirko Filipović (CRO) def. Patrick Barry (USA) by submission (rear naked choke)
  - Light Heavyweight bout: Rich Franklin (USA) def. Chuck Liddell (USA) by KO (punch)

==== Rugby union ====
- IRB Pacific Nations Cup:
  - Samoa 24–23 Tonga in Apia
  - Fiji 22–8 Japan in Lautoka
- Mid-year Tests:
  - Week 3:
    - New Zealand 66–28 Ireland in New Plymouth
    - Australia 27–17 England in Perth
    - South Africa 42–17 France in Cape Town
    - Argentina 16–24 Scotland in Tucumán

==== Volleyball ====
- FIVB World League, Week 2: (teams in **bold** advance to final round)
  - Pool A:
    - Brazil 0–3 Netherlands
    - South Korea 0–3 Bulgaria
      - Standings (after 3 matches): Netherlands 9 points, Brazil 5, Bulgaria 4, South Korea 0.
  - Pool B: France 0–3 Serbia
    - Standings: Serbia 12 points (4 matches), Italy 8 (3), France 1 (4), China 0 (3).
  - Pool C:
    - Russia 3–2 Egypt
    - Finland 1–3 United States
      - Standings (after 4 matches): Russia 11 points, United States 6, Finland 4, Egypt 3.
  - Pool D:
    - **Argentina** 2–3 Poland
    - Cuba 3–1 Germany
      - Standings (after 4 matches): Cuba 11 points, Germany 6, Poland 5, Argentina 2.
- Men's European League, Week 2:
  - Pool A:
    - Spain 0–3 Great Britain
    - Romania 2–3 Slovakia
      - Standings (after 4 matches): Romania 7 points, Great Britain, Slovakia 6, Spain 5.
  - Pool B:
    - Portugal 3–2 Greece
    - Turkey 3–0 Austria
    - Standings (after 3 matches): Portugal 6 points, Greece, Turkey, Austria 4.
- Women's European League, Week 2:
  - Pool A:
    - Serbia 3–0 Great Britain
    - Romania 0–3 Bulgaria
      - Standings: Romania 6 points (4 matches), Serbia, Bulgaria 4 (2), Great Britain 4 (4).
  - Pool B:
    - Israel 3–0 Greece
    - Spain 2–3 Turkey
      - Standings (after 2 matches): Israel, Turkey 4 points, Spain, Greece 2.
- Montreux Volley Masters:
  - Semi-finals:
    - Russia 1–3 **China**
    - Cuba 0–3 **United States**
- Asian Men's Club Championship:
  - Semifinals:
    - Shanghai Oriental (China) 1–3 **(Qatar) Al-Arabi**
    - **Paykan Tehran (Iran)** 3–0 (Japan) Panasonic Panthers

=== June 11, 2010 (Friday) ===
==== Cricket ====
- South Africa in West Indies:
  - 1st Test in Kingston, Jamaica, Day 2:
    - South Africa 352 (129.4 overs); West Indies.
- ICC Intercontinental Cup, Day 2:
  - Netherlands 210 (90 overs); Scotland 273/7 (103 overs) in Deventer. Scotland lead by 63 runs with 3 wickets remaining in the 1st innings.

==== Cycling ====
- UCI ProTour:
  - Critérium du Dauphiné:
    - Stage 5: (gold) Daniel Navarro (ESP) (Astana) 3h 26' 16" (silver) Eros Capecchi (ITA) (Footon–Servetto–Fuji) + 34" (bronze) Thibaut Pinot (FRA) (Française des Jeux) + 34"
      - General classification: (1) Janez Brajkovič (SLO) (Team RadioShack) 19h 55' 04" (2) Tejay van Garderen (USA) (Team HTC–Columbia) + 1' 15" (3) Alberto Contador (ESP) (Astana) + 1' 41"

==== Equestrianism ====
- Show jumping:
  - FEI Nations Cup of Turkey in Istanbul: (gold) France (Stephan Lafouge on Visage Van De Olmenhoeve, Caroline Nicolas on Nobylis, Yoann Le Vot on Modena, Jean Marc Nicolas on Oxford D'Esquelmes) (silver) Belgium (Nick Motmans on Aladdin St Ghyvan, Candice Lauwers on Cibolin Prieure Z, Jody Bosteels on Nina Droeshout, Jan Motmans on Vacant ter Linden) (bronze) Italy (Luca Marziani on Cascartho -O.H., Giovanni Oberti on Caribo Z, Andrea Messersi on Vacant ter Linden, Paolo Zudavelli on Youri du Moulin)
    - Standings (after 6 of 11 competitions): (1) Belgium 40 points (2) Italy 37 (3) Australia 25

==== Football (soccer) ====
- FIFA World Cup in South Africa:
  - Group A:
    - In Johannesburg: South Africa 1–1 Mexico
    - In Cape Town: Uruguay 0–0 France

==== Rugby union ====
- IRB Nations Cup in Bucharest:
  - Namibia 21–17 Romania
  - Argentina XV 20–22 Italy A
  - Scotland A 21–22 Georgia

==== U.S. college sports ====
- Conference realignment:
  - The Mountain West Conference announces that Boise State University will leave the Western Athletic Conference to become the MWC's 10th member. (ESPN)
  - The Big Ten Conference has accepted the application of the University of Nebraska to join the league. Nebraska's move may lead to the demise of the Cornhuskers' current conference, the Big 12, which lost the University of Colorado to the Pac-10 yesterday. (ESPN)

==== Volleyball ====
- FIVB World League, Week 2: (teams in **bold** advance to final round)
  - Pool B: Italy 3–0 China
    - Standings (after 3 matches): Serbia 9 points, Italy 8, France 1, China 0.
  - Pool C:
    - Russia 3–1 Egypt
    - Finland 1–3 United States
      - Standings (after 3 matches): Russia 9 points, Finland 4, USA 3, Egypt 2.
  - Pool D:
    - **Argentina** 1–3 Poland
    - Cuba 3–0 Germany
      - Standings (after 3 matches): Cuba 8 points, Germany 6, Poland 3, Argentina 1.
- Men's European League, Week 2:
  - Pool A:
    - Spain 3–1 Great Britain
    - Romania 3–0 Slovakia
      - Standings (after 3 matches): Romania 6 points, Spain, Great Britain, Slovakia 4.
- Women's European League, Week 2:
  - Pool A:
    - Serbia 3–0 Great Britain
    - Romania 0–3 Bulgaria
      - Standings: Romania 5 points (3 matches), Great Britain 3 (3), Serbia, Bulgaria 2 (1).
  - Pool B:
    - Israel 3–1 Greece
    - Spain 2–3 Turkey
- Montreux Volley Masters: (teams in **bold** advance to the semifinals)
  - Group A:
    - Germany 1–3 Japan
    - **United States** 1–3 **Russia**
      - Final standings: Russia 6 points, United States 5, Japan 4, Germany 3.
  - Group B: **Cuba** 3–0 Poland
    - Final standings: Cuba 6 points, **China** 5, Netherlands 4, Poland 3.
- Asian Men's Club Championship:
  - Quarterfinals:
    - **Panasonic Panthers (Japan)** 3–1 (Thailand) Federbrau
    - **Al-Arabi (Qatar)** 3–1 (Kazakhstan) Almaty
    - **Shanghai Oriental (China)** 3–1 (Myanmar) Asia World
    - **Paykan Tehran (Iran)** 3–0 (Vietnam) Sports Center 1

=== June 10, 2010 (Thursday) ===
==== Athletics ====
- IAAF Diamond League:
  - Golden Gala in Rome, Italy:
    - Men:
      - 100 metres: Asafa Powell (JAM) 9.82
      - 200 metres: Walter Dix (USA) 19.86
      - 400 metres: Jeremy Wariner (USA) 44.73
      - 1500 metres: Augustine Kiprono Choge (KEN) 3:32.21
      - 5000 metres: Imane Merga (ETH) 13:00.12
      - 110 metres hurdles: Dayron Robles (CUB) 13.14
      - 4 × 100 metres relay: France 38.50
      - Long jump: Dwight Phillips (USA) 8.42 m
      - Shot put: Christian Cantwell (USA) 21.67 m
      - Discus throw: Piotr Małachowski (POL) 68.78 m
    - Women:
      - 100 metres: LaShauntea Moore (USA) 11.04
      - 800 metres: Halima Hachlaf (MAR) 1:58.40
      - 400 metres hurdles: Lashinda Demus (USA) 52.82
      - 3000 metres steeplechase: Milcah Chemos Cheywa (KEN) 9:11.71
      - Triple jump: Yargelis Savigne (CUB) 14.74 m
      - High jump: Blanka Vlašić (CRO) 2.03 m
      - Pole vault: Fabiana Murer (BRA) 4.70 m
      - Javelin throw: Barbora Špotáková (CZE) 68.66 m

==== Basketball ====
- (United States) NBA Finals (best-of-7 series):
  - Game 4: Boston Celtics 96, Los Angeles Lakers 89. Series tied 2–2.
- (Spain) ACB Finals (best-of-5 series):
  - Game 1: Regal FC Barcelona 58–63 Caja Laboral. Caja Laboral lead series 1–0.

==== Cricket ====
- South Africa in West Indies:
  - 1st Test in Kingston, Jamaica, Day 1:
    - South Africa 70/3 (34 overs); West Indies
- ICC Intercontinental Cup, Day 1:
  - Netherlands 210 (90 overs); Scotland 16/1 (6 overs) in Deventer. Scotland trail by 194 runs with 9 wickets remaining in the 1st innings.

==== Cycling ====
- UCI ProTour:
  - Critérium du Dauphiné:
    - Stage 4: (gold) Nicolas Vogondy (FRA) (Bbox Bouygues Telecom) 6h 03' 25" (silver) Romain Sicard (FRA) (Euskaltel–Euskadi) + 12" (bronze) Janez Brajkovič (SLO) (Team RadioShack) + 15"
      - General classification: (1) Brajkovič 16h 25' 44" (2) Tejay van Garderen (USA) (Team HTC–Columbia) + 1' 15" (3) Alberto Contador (ESP) (Astana) + 1' 41"

==== U.S. college sports ====
- News:
  - The Pacific-10 Conference officially announces that the University of Colorado, currently a member of the Big 12 Conference, has formally accepted an invitation to join that conference. (ESPN)
  - The NCAA announces major penalties against the University of Southern California's football program following revelations of improper benefits to 2005 Heisman Trophy winner Reggie Bush. The Trojans are banned from postseason play for two years, lose 10 scholarships in each of the next three seasons, and must vacate 14 wins from December 2004 through 2005, including their win in the BCS National Championship Game following the 2004 season. (ESPN)

==== Volleyball ====
- FIVB World League, Week 2:
  - Pool B: France 0–3 Serbia
    - Standings: Serbia 9 points (3 matches), Italy 5 (2), France 1 (3), China 0 (2).
- Montreux Volley Masters: (teams in **bold** advance to the semifinals)
  - Group A: **Russia** 3–0 Germany
    - Standings (after 2 matches): Russia, **United States** 4 points, Germany, Japan 2.
  - Group B:
    - Poland 1–3 Netherlands
    - **China** 2–3 **Cuba**
      - Standings: China 5 points (3 matches), Cuba 4 (2), Netherlands 4 (3), Poland 2 (2).

=== June 9, 2010 (Wednesday) ===
==== Basketball ====
- (Slovenia) Premier A Slovenian Basketball League Finals (best-of-5 series):
  - Game 5: Union Olimpija 79–87 Krka. **Krka win series 3–2.**
    - Krka win the championship for the third time.
- (Germany) Basketball Bundesliga Finals (best-of-5 series):
  - Game 2: Deutsche Bank Skyliners 68–77 Brose Baskets Bamberg. Series tied 1–1.

==== Cricket ====
- Tri-nation series in Zimbabwe:
  - Final in Harare:
    - Zimbabwe 199 (49 overs); Sri Lanka 203/1 (34.4 overs; Tillakaratne Dilshan 108*). **Sri Lanka win by 9 wickets.**

==== Cycling ====
- UCI ProTour:
  - Critérium du Dauphiné:
    - Stage 3: (gold) Janez Brajkovič (SLO) (Team RadioShack) 1h 01' 51" (silver) David Millar (GBR) (Garmin–Transitions) + 27" (bronze) Edvald Boasson Hagen (NOR) (Team Sky) + 44"
      - General classification: (1) Brajkovič 10h 22' 04" (2) Millar + 36" (3) Tejay van Garderen (USA) (Team HTC–Columbia) + 50"

==== Football (soccer) ====
- 2011 FIFA Women's World Cup qualification (UEFA): (teams in ~~strike~~ are eliminated)
  - Group 5: ~~Austria~~ 6–0 ~~Malta~~
    - Standings: England 15 points (5 matches), Spain 15 (6), Austria, ~~Turkey~~ 6 (5), Malta 0 (7).

==== Ice hockey ====
- Stanley Cup Finals (best-of-7 series):
  - Game 6: Chicago Blackhawks 4, Philadelphia Flyers 3 (OT). **Blackhawks win series 4–2.**
    - The Blackhawks win the Cup for the fourth time and the first time since 1961.
    - Blackhawks captain Jonathan Toews is awarded the Conn Smythe Trophy as the MVP of the playoffs.
    - The Blackhawks' victory also makes Toews the newest member of the Triple Gold Club, consisting of individuals who have won the Stanley Cup, a World Championship gold medal, and Olympic gold medal.

==== Rugby union ====
- IRB Junior World Championship in Argentina:
  - Pool A:
    - Wales 31–3 Fiji
    - New Zealand 77–7 Samoa
      - Standings (after 2 matches): New Zealand 10 points, Wales 8, Fiji, Samoa 0.
  - Pool B:
    - England 36–21 Ireland
    - Argentina 23–31 France
      - Standings (after 2 matches): England, France 9 points, Ireland 1, Argentina 0.
  - Pool C:
    - Australia 67–5 Tonga
    - South Africa 73–0 Scotland
      - Standings (after 2 matches): Australia, South Africa 10 points, Tonga, Scotland 0.
- Churchill Cup in the United States:
  - Pool matches in Glendale, Colorado: (teams in ~~strike~~ advance to bowl final)
    - Pool A: ~~Uruguay~~ 10–43 France A
      - Standings: Canada, France A 5 points (1 match), Uruguay 0 (2).
    - Pool B: ~~Russia~~ 17–49 England A
      - Standings: England Saxons, United States 5 points (1 match), Russia 0 (2).

==== Volleyball ====
- Montreux Volley Masters:
  - Group A:
    - United States 3–1 Germany
    - Russia 3–0 Japan
      - Standings: United States 4 points (2 matches), Russia 2 (1), Japan 2 (2), Germany 1 (1).
  - Group B: Netherlands 0–3 China
    - Standings: China 4 points (2 matches), Cuba 2 (1), Netherlands 2 (2), Poland 1 (1).

=== June 8, 2010 (Tuesday) ===
==== Basketball ====
- (United States) NBA Finals (best-of-7 series):
  - Game 3: Los Angeles Lakers 91, Boston Celtics 84. Lakers lead series 2–1.

==== Cycling ====
- UCI ProTour:
  - Critérium du Dauphiné:
    - Stage 2: (gold) Juan José Haedo (ARG) (Team Saxo Bank) 4h 24' 10" (silver) Martin Reimer (GER) (Cervélo TestTeam) s.t. (bronze) Grega Bole (SLO) (Lampre–Farnese Vini) s.t.
      - General classification: (1) Alberto Contador (ESP) (Astana) 9h 20' 08" (2) Tejay van Garderen (USA) (Team HTC–Columbia) + 2" (3) Janez Brajkovič (SLO) (Team RadioShack) + 5"

==== Football (soccer) ====
- 2011 European Under-21 Championship qualification: (teams in ~~strike~~ are eliminated)
  - Group 6: Sweden 2–0 Montenegro
    - Standings: Sweden 16 points (6 matches), Montenegro 13 (7), Israel 10 (6), ~~Kazakhstan~~ 5 (8), ~~Bulgaria~~ 4 (7).

==== Volleyball ====
- Montreux Volley Masters:
  - Group A: Japan 0–3 United States
  - Group B:
    - Cuba 3–1 China
    - China 3–0 Poland

=== June 7, 2010 (Monday) ===
==== Baseball ====
- MLB draft:
  - Bryce Harper, a 17-year-old catcher and outfielder at the College of Southern Nevada, is selected as the first overall pick by the Washington Nationals.

==== Basketball ====
- (Russia) Russian Super League Final (best-of-5 series):
  - Game 3: Khimki Moscow Region 60–76 CSKA Moscow. **CSKA Moscow win series 3–0.**
    - CSKA Moscow win the championship for the eighth consecutive time and 17th time overall.

==== Cricket ====
- Tri-nation series in Zimbabwe:
  - Group stage: (teams in **bold** advance to the final)
    - **Sri Lanka** 236 (47.5 overs); **Zimbabwe** 240/2 (47.5 overs; Brendan Taylor 119*) in Harare. **Zimbabwe win by 8 wickets.**
      - Final standings: Zimbabwe 13 points, Sri Lanka 9, India 4.

==== Cycling ====
- UCI ProTour:
  - Critérium du Dauphiné:
    - Stage 1: (gold) Grega Bole (SLO) (Lampre–Farnese Vini) 4h 47' 24" (silver) Peter Velits (SVK) (Team HTC–Columbia) s.t. (bronze) Geraint Thomas (GBR) (Team Sky) s.t.
      - General classification: (1) Alberto Contador (ESP) (Astana) 4h 55' 58" (2) Tejay van Garderen (USA) (Team HTC–Columbia) + 2" (3) Janez Brajkovič (SLO) (Team RadioShack) + 5"

==== Football (soccer) ====
- Egypt Cup Final in Cairo:
  - **Haras El Hodood** 1–1 (5–4 pen.) Al-Ahly
    - Haras El Hodood win the Cup for the second successive season.

=== June 6, 2010 (Sunday) ===
==== Auto racing ====
- NASCAR Sprint Cup Series:
  - Gillette Fusion ProGlide 500 in Long Pond, Pennsylvania:
    - (1) (Virginia) Denny Hamlin (Toyota, Joe Gibbs Racing) (2) (Nevada) Kyle Busch (Toyota, Joe Gibbs Racing) (3) (Indiana) Tony Stewart (Chevrolet, Stewart Haas Racing)
      - Drivers' championship standings (after 14 of 36 races): (1) (California) Kevin Harvick (Chevrolet, Richard Childress Racing) 2063 points (2) Busch 2044 (3) Hamlin 1927

==== Basketball ====
- (United States) NBA Finals (best-of-7 series):
  - Game 2: Boston Celtics 103, Los Angeles Lakers 94. Series tied 1–1.
- (Greece) A1 Ethniki Final (best-of-5 series):
  - Game 4: Olympiacos 69–76 Panathinaikos. Game abandoned due to fan riots, Greek Federation awarded technical win to Panathinaikos. **Panathinaikos win series 3–1.**
    - Panathinaikos win the championship for the eighth consecutive time and 31st time overall.
- (Brazil) Novo Basquete Brasil Finals (best-of-5 series):
  - Game 5: Universo/BRB 76–74 Flamengo. **Universo win series 3–2.**
    - Universo win the championship for the first time.
- (Slovenia) Premier A Slovenian Basketball League Finals (best-of-5 series):
  - Game 4: Krka 63–67 Union Olimpija. Series tied 2–2.
- (Germany) Basketball Bundesliga Finals (best-of-5 series):
  - Game 1: Brose Baskets Bamberg 63–65 Deutsche Bank Skyliners. Skyliners lead series 1–0.

==== Cricket ====
- Bangladesh in England:
  - 2nd Test in Manchester, day 3:
    - England 419; Bangladesh 216 and 123 (f/o; 34.1 overs). **England win by an innings and 80 runs; win 2-match series 2–0.**

==== Cycling ====
- UCI ProTour:
  - Critérium du Dauphiné:
    - Prologue: (gold) Alberto Contador (ESP) (Astana) 8' 34" (silver) Tejay van Garderen (USA) (Team HTC–Columbia) + 2" (bronze) Janez Brajkovič (SLO) (Team RadioShack) + 5"

==== Golf ====
- PGA Tour:
  - Memorial Tournament in Dublin, Ohio:
    - Winner: Justin Rose (ENG) 270 (−18)
      - Rose wins his first PGA Tour title.
- European Tour:
  - Celtic Manor Wales Open in Newport, Wales:
    - Winner: Graeme McDowell (NIR) 269 (−15)
      - McDowell wins his fifth European Tour title.
- Champions Tour:
  - Principal Charity Classic in West Des Moines, Iowa:
    - Winner: Nick Price (ZIM) 199 (−14)
      - Price wins his third Champions Tour title.

==== Ice hockey ====
- Stanley Cup Finals (best-of-7 series):
  - Game 5: Chicago Blackhawks 7, Philadelphia Flyers 4. Blackhawks lead series 3–2.

==== Motorcycle racing ====
- Moto GP:
  - Italian motorcycle Grand Prix in Mugello, Italy:
    - MotoGP: (1) Dani Pedrosa (ESP) (Honda) (2) Jorge Lorenzo (ESP) (Yamaha) (3) Andrea Dovizioso (ITA) (Honda)
      - Riders' championship standings (after 4 of 18 rounds): (1) Lorenzo 90 points (2) Pedrosa 65 (3) Valentino Rossi (ITA) (Yamaha) 61
      - Manufacturers' championship standings: (1) Yamaha 95 points (2) Honda 77 (3) Ducati 52
    - Moto2: (1) Andrea Iannone (ITA) (Speed Up) (2) Sergio Gadea (ESP) (Pons Kalex) (3) Simone Corsi (ITA) (MotoBi)
      - Riders' championship standings (after 4 of 17 rounds): (1) Toni Elías (ESP) (Moriwaki) 74 points (2) Shoya Tomizawa (JPN) (Suter) 55 (3) Corsi 51
      - Manufacturers' championship standings: (1) Moriwaki 76 points (2) Suter 75 (3) MotoBi 53
    - 125cc: (1) Marc Márquez (ESP) (Derbi) (2) Nicolás Terol (ESP) (Aprilia) (3) Pol Espargaró (ESP) (Aprilia)
      - Riders' championship standings (after 4 of 17 rounds): (1) Terol 85 points (2) Espargaró 79 (3) Márquez 57
      - Manufacturers' championship standings: (1) Derbi 95 points (2) Aprilia 85 (3) Honda 7

==== Snooker ====
- Wuxi Classic in Wuxi, China:
  - Final: **Shaun Murphy** (ENG) def. Ding Junhui (CHN) 9–8

==== Tennis ====
- Grand Slams:
  - French Open in Paris, France:
    - Men's singles final:
      - **Rafael Nadal** (ESP) [2] def. Robin Söderling (SWE) [5] 6–4, 6–2, 6–4
        - Nadal wins the title for the fifth time in six years.
    - Boys' singles final:
      - **Agustín Velotti** (ARG) def. Andrea Collarini (USA) 6–4, 7–5
    - Girls' singles final:
      - **Elina Svitolina** (UKR) def. Ons Jabeur (TUN) 6–2, 7–5
    - Legends under 45 doubles final:
      - **Yevgeny Kafelnikov** (RUS) / **Andriy Medvedev** (UKR) def. Goran Ivanišević (CRO) / Michael Stich (GER) 6–1, 6–1
    - Legends over 45 doubles final:
      - **Andrés Gómez** (ECU) / **John McEnroe** (USA) def. Mansour Bahrami (IRN) / Henri Leconte (FRA) 6–1, 6–1

==== Triathlon ====
- ITU World Championships in Madrid, Spain:
  - Men: (gold) Alistair Brownlee (GBR) (silver) Courtney Atkinson (AUS) (bronze) Sven Riederer (SUI)
    - Standings (after 3 of 7 events): (1) Alexander Brukhankov (RUS) 1723 points (2) Dmitry Polyanski (RUS) 1639 (3) Atkinson 1480
  - Women: (gold) Nicola Spirig (SUI) (silver) Emmie Charayron (FRA) (bronze) Helen Jenkins (GBR)
    - Standings (after 3 of 7 events): (1) Barbara Riveros Diaz (CHI) 2082 points (2) Mariko Adachi (JPN) 1767 (3) Daniela Ryf (SUI) 1543

==== Volleyball ====
- FIVB World League, Week 1: (teams in **bold** advance to final round)
  - Pool A: South Korea 0–3 Netherlands
    - Standings (after 2 matches): Netherlands 6 points, Brazil 5, Bulgaria 1, South Korea 0.
  - Pool B: Serbia 3–1 China
    - Standings (after 2 matches): Serbia 6 points, Italy 5, France 1, China 0.
  - Pool C: Finland 3–1 Egypt
    - Standings (after 2 matches): Russia 6 points, Finland 4, Egypt 2, United States 0.
  - Pool D: Germany 3–0 Poland
    - Standings (after 2 matches): Germany 6 points, Cuba 5, **Argentina** 1, Poland 0.
- Men's European League, Week 1:
  - Pool A: Great Britain 3–0 Slovakia
    - Standings (after 2 matches): Romania 4 points, Great Britain, Slovakia 3, Spain 2.
  - Pool B: Turkey 0–3 Portugal
    - Standings (after 2 matches): Portugal 4 points, Greece, Austria 3, Turkey 2.
- Women's European League, Week 1:
  - Pool A: Great Britain 0–3 Romania
    - Standings: Romania 4 points (2 matches), Great Britain 2 (2), Serbia, Bulgaria 0 (0).

=== June 5, 2010 (Saturday) ===
==== Auto racing ====
- Nationwide Series:
  - Federated Auto Parts 300 in Gladeville, Tennessee:
    - (1) (Michigan) Brad Keselowski (Dodge; Penske Racing) (2) (Missouri) Carl Edwards (Ford; Roush Fenway Racing) (3) (Wisconsin) Paul Menard (Ford; Roush Fenway Racing)
      - Drivers' championship standings (after 13 of 35 races): (1) Keselowski 2141 points (2) (Nevada) Kyle Busch (Toyota; Joe Gibbs Racing) 1945 (3) Edwards 1864
- IndyCar Series:
  - Firestone 550 in Fort Worth, Texas:
    - (1) Ryan Briscoe (AUS) (Team Penske) (2) Danica Patrick (USA) (Andretti Autosport) (3) Marco Andretti (USA) (Andretti Autosport)
      - Drivers' championship standings (after 7 of 17 races): (1) Dario Franchitti (GBR) (Chip Ganassi Racing) 246 points (2) Will Power (AUS) (Team Penske) 243 (3) Scott Dixon (NZL) (Chip Ganassi Racing) 235

==== Basketball ====
- (Czech Republic) National Basketball League Final (best-of-7 series):
  - Game 5: Nymburk 75–67 Prostějov. **Nymburk win series 4–1.**
    - Nymburk win the championship for the seventh straight time.

==== Cricket ====
- Bangladesh in England:
  - 2nd Test in Manchester, day 2:
    - England 419 (121.3 overs; Ian Bell 128); Bangladesh 216 (54.1 overs; Tamim Iqbal 108). Bangladesh trail by 203 runs.
- Tri-nation series in Zimbabwe:
  - Group stage: (teams in **bold** advance to the final)
    - India 268/9 (50 overs); **Sri Lanka** 270/4 (48.2 overs; Dinesh Chandimal 111) in Harare. **Sri Lanka win by 6 wickets**.
      - Standings: Sri Lanka, **Zimbabwe** 9 points (3 matches), India 4 (4).

==== Football (soccer) ====
- 2011 FIFA Women's World Cup qualification (UEFA): (teams in ~~strike~~ are eliminated)
  - Group 1: Estonia 2–1 ~~Northern Ireland~~
    - Standings: France 18 points (6 matches), Iceland 15 (6), Serbia 7 (6), Estonia 6 (5), Northern Ireland 3 (5), ~~Croatia~~ 1 (6)
- UEFA Women's Under-19 Championship:
  - Final: **France** 2–1 England
    - France win the title for the second time.

==== Horse racing ====
- English Triple Crown:
  - Epsom Derby in Epsom, Surrey: (1) Workforce (trainer: Michael Stoute, jockey: Ryan L. Moore) (2) At First Sight (trainer: Aidan O'Brien, jockey: Seamie Heffernan) (3) Rewilding (trainer: Mahmood Al Zarooni, jockey: Frankie Dettori)
- U.S. Triple Crown:
  - Belmont Stakes in Elmont, New York: (1) Drosselmeyer (trainer: William I. Mott, jockey: Mike E. Smith) (2) Fly Down (trainer: Nick Zito, jockey: John R. Velazquez) (3) First Dude (trainer: Dale L. Romans, jockey: Ramon A. Dominguez)

==== Rugby union ====
- 2011 Rugby World Cup qualifying:
  - European Nations Cup Champions Playoff Series:
    - Round 5, second leg (first leg score in parentheses):
      - **Romania** 61–7 (33–3) Ukraine in Botoşani. Romania win 94–10 on aggregate.
        - Romania advance to the Final Place Play-off.
- Mid-year Tests:
  - Week 2:
    - Australia 49–3 Fiji in Canberra
    - Wales 31–34 South Africa in Cardiff
- Churchill Cup:
  - Pool matches in Glendale, Colorado:
    - Pool A: Uruguay 6–48 Canada
    - Pool B: Russia 39–22 United States
- IRB Junior World Championship in Argentina:
  - Pool A:
    - Wales 22–13 Samoa
    - Fiji 11–44 New Zealand
  - Pool B:
    - France 25–22 Ireland
    - Argentina 22–48 England
  - Pool C:
    - Tonga 14–40 South Africa
    - Australia 34–13 Scotland

==== Tennis ====
- Grand Slams:
  - French Open in Paris, France:
    - Women's singles final:
      - **Francesca Schiavone** (ITA) [17] def. Samantha Stosur (AUS) [7] 6–4, 7–6(2)
        - Schiavone becomes the first Italian woman to win a Grand Slam event in singles, and the first Italian to do so since Adriano Panatta at the 1976 French Open.
    - Men's doubles final:
      - **Daniel Nestor** (CAN) / **Nenad Zimonjić** (SRB) [2] def. Lukáš Dlouhý (CZE) / Leander Paes (IND) [3] 7–5, 6–2
        - Nestor and Zimonjić win their third Grand Slam title as a team, while Nestor also has three titles with former partner Mark Knowles.
    - Boys' doubles final:
      - **Duilio Beretta** (PER) / **Roberto Quiroz** (ECU) [7] def. Facundo Argüello (ARG) / Agustín Velotti (ARG) 6–3, 6–2
    - Girls' doubles final:
      - **Tímea Babos** (HUN) / **Sloane Stephens** (USA) [5] def. Lara Arruabarrena-Vecino (ESP) / María-Teresa Torró-Flor (ESP) 6–2, 6–3
    - Women's legends doubles final:
      - **Martina Navratilova** (USA) / **Jana Novotná** (CZE) def. Iva Majoli (CRO) / Nathalie Tauziat (FRA) 6–4, 6–2

==== Volleyball ====
- FIVB World League, Week 1: (teams in **bold** advance to final round)
  - Pool A:
    - South Korea 0–3 Netherlands
    - Brazil 3–2 Bulgaria
      - Standings: Brazil 5 points (2 matches), Netherlands 3 (1), Bulgaria 1 (2), South Korea 0 (1).
  - Pool B: Italy 3–2 France
    - Standings: Italy 5 points (2 matches), Serbia 3 (1), France 1 (2), China 0 (1).
  - Pool C:
    - Russia 3–1 United States
    - Finland 2–3 Egypt
      - Standings: Russia 6 points (2 matches), Egypt 2 (1), Finland 1 (1), USA 0 (2).
  - Pool D:
    - Germany 3–1 Poland
    - Cuba 3–2 **Argentina**
      - Standings: Cuba 5 points (2 matches), Germany 3 (1), Argentina 1 (2), Poland 0 (1).
- Men's European League, Week 1:
  - Pool A:
    - Great Britain 1–3 Slovakia
    - Spain 2–3 Romania
      - Standings: Romania 4 points (2 matches), Slovakia 2 (1), Spain 2 (2), Great Britain 1 (1).
  - Pool B:
    - Turkey 1–3 Portugal
    - Austria 0–3 Greece
      - Standings: Greece, Austria 3 points (2 matches), Portugal 2 (1), Turkey 1 (1).
- Women's European League, Week 1:
  - Pool A: Great Britain 0–3 Romania

=== June 4, 2010 (Friday) ===
==== Athletics ====
- IAAF Diamond League:
  - Bislett Games in Oslo, Norway:
    - Men:
      - 100m: Asafa Powell (JAM) 9.72
      - 400m hurdles: Kerron Clement (USA) 48.12
      - 800m: David Rudisha (KEN) 1:42.04
      - 1 mile: Asbel Kiprop (KEN) 3:49.56
      - 5000m: Imane Merga (ETH) 12:53.81
      - Javelin: Andreas Thorkildsen (NOR) 86.00m
      - Pole vault: Renaud Lavillenie (FRA) 5.80m
      - Shot put: Christian Cantwell (USA) 21.31m
    - Women:
      - 100m hurdles: Lolo Jones (USA) 12.66
      - 200m: Carmelita Jeter (USA) 22.54
      - 400m: Amantle Montsho (BOT) 50.34
      - 3000m steeplechase: Milcah Chemos Cheywa (KEN) 9:12.66
      - Discus: Nadine Müller (GER) 63.93m
      - High jump: Blanka Vlašić (CRO) 2.01m
      - Long jump: Olga Kucherenko (RUS) 6.91m

==== Baseball ====
- Major League Baseball news:
  - The Baltimore Orioles become the second MLB team this season to fire their manager, axing Dave Trembley after starting the season with a 15–39 record, the worst in MLB. Juan Samuel is named as interim manager. (AP via ESPN)

==== Basketball ====
- (Russia) Russian Super League Final (best-of-5 series):
  - Game 2: CSKA Moscow 69–54 Khimki Moscow Region. CSKA Moscow lead series 2–0.

==== Cricket ====
- Bangladesh in England:
  - 2nd Test in Manchester, day 1:
    - England 275/5 (83 overs); Bangladesh.

==== Equestrianism ====
- Show jumping
  - Meydan FEI Nations Cup:
    - FEI Nations Cup of Switzerland in St. Gallen (CSIO 5*): (gold) France (Kevin Staut on Kraque Boom, Penelope Leprevost on Topinambour, Nicolas Delmotte on Luccianno, Olivier Guillon on Lord De Theize) (silver) Germany (Marco Kutscher on Cash, Carsten-Otto Nagel on Corradina, Ludger Beerbaum on Gotha, Marcus Ehning on Plot Blue) (bronze) United Kingdom (Peter Charles on Murkas Pom D'Ami, Ben Maher on Robin Hood W, Michael Whitaker on GIG Amai, John Whitaker on Peppermill)
      - Standings (after 3 of 8 competitions): (1) France 30 points (2) United Kingdom 18.5 (3) Germany 16.5

==== Football (soccer) ====
- 2011 European Under-21 Championship qualification: (teams in ~~strike~~ are eliminated)
  - Group 6: Israel 0–1 Sweden
    - Standings: Sweden 13 points (5 matches), Montenegro 13 (6), Israel 10 (6), ~~Kazakhstan~~ 5 (8), ~~Bulgaria~~ 4 (7)

==== Ice hockey ====
- Stanley Cup Finals (best-of-7 series):
  - Game 4: Philadelphia Flyers 5, Chicago Blackhawks 3. Series tied 2–2.

==== Rugby union ====
- Mid-year Tests:
  - Week 2:
    - Ireland 23–29 Barbarians in Limerick

==== Tennis ====
- Grand Slams:
  - French Open in Paris, France:
    - Men's singles, semifinals:
      - **Rafael Nadal** (ESP) [2] def. Jürgen Melzer (AUT) [22] 6–2, 6–3, 7–6(6)
        - Nadal reaches the final for the fifth time in six years.
      - **Robin Söderling** (SWE) [5] def. Tomáš Berdych (CZE) [15] 6–3, 3–6, 5–7, 6–3, 6–3
        - Söderling reaches the final for the second successive year.
    - Women's doubles final:
      - **Serena Williams** (USA) / **Venus Williams** (USA) [1] def. Květa Peschke (CZE) / Katarina Srebotnik (SLO) 6–2, 6–3
        - The Williams sisters win their 12th Grand Slam doubles title and second at the French Open. With the victory, the sisters now hold all four Women's doubles Grand Slams.
    - Wheelchair men's singles final:
      - **Shingo Kunieda** (JPN) [1] def. Stefan Olsson (SWE) 6–4, 6–0
        - Kunieda wins his tenth Grand Slam and fourth French Open title in singles.
    - Wheelchair women's singles final:
      - **Esther Vergeer** (NED) [1] def. Sharon Walraven (NED) 6–0, 6–0
        - Vergeer wins her 15th Grand Slam and fourth French Open title in singles.
    - Wheelchair men's doubles final:
      - **Stéphane Houdet** (FRA) / **Shingo Kunieda** (JPN) [1] def. Robin Ammerlaan (NED) / Stefan Olsson (SWE) 6–0, 5–7, [10–8]
        - Houdet wins his fourth Grand Slam and first French Open title in doubles, and Kunieda wins his ninth Grand Slam and second French Open title in doubles.
    - Wheelchair women's doubles final:
      - **Daniela Di Toro** (AUS) / **Aniek van Koot** (NED) [1] def. Esther Vergeer (NED) / Sharon Walraven (NED) [2] 3–6, 6–3, [10–4]
        - Di Toro and van Koot win their first Grand Slam title in doubles.

==== Volleyball ====
- FIVB World League, Week 1: (teams in **bold** advance to final round)
  - Pool A: Brazil 3–1 Bulgaria
  - Pool B:
    - Serbia 3–0 China
    - Italy 3–0 France
  - Pool C: Russia 3–0 United States
  - Pool D: Cuba 3–1 **Argentina**
- Men's European League, Week 1:
  - Pool A: Spain 1–3 Romania
  - Pool B: Austria 3–2 Greece

=== June 3, 2010 (Thursday) ===
==== Basketball ====
- (United States) NBA Finals (best-of-7 series):
  - Game 1: Los Angeles Lakers 102, Boston Celtics 89. Lakers lead series 1–0.
- (Russia) Russian Super League Final (best-of-5 series):
  - Game 1: CSKA Moscow 89–58 Khimki Moscow Region. CSKA Moscow lead series 1–0.
- (Brazil) Novo Basquete Brasil Finals (best-of-5 series):
  - Game 4: Flamengo 94–74 Universo/BRB. Series tied 2–2.
- (Slovenia) Premier A Slovenian Basketball League Finals (best-of-5 series):
  - Game 3: Union Olimpija 74–76 Krka. Krka lead series 2–1.

==== Cricket ====
- South Africa in West Indies:
  - 5th ODI in Port of Spain, Trinidad:
    - West Indies 252/6 (50 overs); South Africa 255/9 (49.4 overs). **South Africa win by 1 wicket; win 5-match series 5–0.**
- Tri-nation series in Zimbabwe:
  - Group stage:
    - India 194/9 (50 overs); Zimbabwe 197/3 (38.2 overs) in Harare. **Zimbabwe win by 7 wickets.**
      - Standings: Zimbabwe 9 points (3 matches), Sri Lanka 5 (2), India 4 (3).

==== Tennis ====
- Grand Slams:
  - French Open in Paris, France:
    - Women's singles, semifinals:
      - **Samantha Stosur** (AUS) [7] def. Jelena Janković (SRB) [4] 6–1, 6–2
        - Stosur reaches the final of a Grand Slam for the first time in singles, and becomes the first Australian woman to reach a Grand Slam singles final since Evonne Goolagong Cawley won the 1980 Wimbledon Championships.
      - **Francesca Schiavone** (ITA) [17] def. Elena Dementieva (RUS) [5] 7–6(3) retired
        - Schiavone becomes the first Italian woman to reach a Grand Slam singles final.
    - Mixed doubles final:
      - **Katarina Srebotnik** (SLO) / **Nenad Zimonjić** (SRB) [6] def. Yaroslava Shvedova (KAZ) / Julian Knowle (AUT) 4–6, 7–6(5), [11–9]
        - Srebotnik and Zimonjić both win their fourth Grand Slam mixed doubles title.

=== June 2, 2010 (Wednesday) ===
==== Basketball ====
- (Turkey) Turkish Basketball League Finals (best-of-7 series):
  - Game 6: Fenerbahçe Ülker 76–51 Efes Pilsen. **Fenerbahçe Ülker win series 4–2.**
    - Fenerbahçe Ülker win the championship for the fourth time.
- (Greece) A1 Ethniki Final (best-of-5 series):
  - Game 3: Panathinaikos 79–70 Olympiacos. Panathinaikos lead series 2–1.
- (Czech Republic) National Basketball League Final (best-of-7 series):
  - Game 4: Prostějov 60–90 Nymburk. Nymburk lead series 3–1.
- (Slovenia) Premier A Slovenian Basketball League Finals (best-of-5 series):
  - Game 2: Krka 74–66 Union Olimpija. Series tied 1–1.

==== Football (soccer) ====
- UEFA Women's Under-19 Championship:
  - Semifinals:
    - Germany 1–1 (3–5 pen.) **France**
    - Netherlands 0–0 (4–5 pen.) **England**

==== Ice hockey ====
- Stanley Cup Finals (best-of-7 series):
  - Game 3: Philadelphia Flyers 4, Chicago Blackhawks 3 (OT). Blackhawks lead series 2–1.

==== Tennis ====
- Grand Slams:
  - French Open in Paris, France:
    - Men's singles, quarterfinals:
      - **Rafael Nadal** (ESP) [2] def. Nicolás Almagro (ESP) [19] 7–6(2), 7–6(3), 6–4
      - **Jürgen Melzer** (AUT) [22] def. Novak Djokovic (SRB) [3] 3–6, 2–6, 6–2, 7–6(3), 6–4
        - Melzer reaches the semi-final of a Grand Slam for the first time.
    - Women's singles, quarterfinals:
      - **Samantha Stosur** (AUS) [7] def. Serena Williams (USA) [1] 6–2, 6–7(2), 8–6
      - **Jelena Janković** (SRB) [4] def. Yaroslava Shvedova (KAZ) 7–5, 6–4

=== June 1, 2010 (Tuesday) ===
==== Basketball ====
- (Czech Republic) National Basketball League Final (best-of-7 series):
  - Game 3: Prostějov 86–74 Nymburk. Nymburk lead series 2–1.

==== Cricket ====
- Tri-nation series in Zimbabwe:
  - Group stage:
    - Zimbabwe 118 (24.5/26 overs); Sri Lanka 119/1 (15.2 overs) in Bulawayo. **Sri Lanka win by 9 wickets.**
      - Standings (after 2 matches): Sri Lanka 5 points, India, Zimbabwe 4.

==== Tennis ====
- Grand Slams:
  - French Open in Paris, France:
    - Men's singles, quarterfinals:
      - **Robin Söderling** (SWE) [5] def. Roger Federer (SUI) [1] 3–6, 6–3, 7–5, 6–4
        - Federer fails to make the semi-final of a Grand Slam for the first time since the 2004 French Open.
      - **Tomáš Berdych** (CZE) [15] def. Mikhail Youzhny (RUS) [11] 6–3, 6–1, 6–2
        - Berdych reach his first Grand Slam semifinal.
    - Women's singles, quarterfinals:
      - **Francesca Schiavone** (ITA) [17] def. Caroline Wozniacki (DEN) [3] 6–2, 6–3
        - Schiavone becomes the first Italian woman to reach a Grand Slam semifinal since 1954.
      - **Elena Dementieva** (RUS) [5] def. Nadia Petrova (RUS) [19] 2–6, 6–2, 6–0
