= English cricket team in Scotland in 2010 =

	England	Scotland
- Date: 19 June 2010
Captains	Andrew Strauss	Gavin Hamilton

One Day International series
- Results: England won the 1-match series 1–0
Most runs	Craig Kieswetter (69)	Kyle Coetzer (51)
Most wickets	Michael Yardy (3)	Majid Haq (2)

The England cricket team toured Scotland in 2010. The tour consisted of one One Day International (ODI), played on 19 June 2010.

== Only ODI ==
19 June
Scorecard

Scotland; 211 (49.5 overs)	v	England; 213/3 (33.4 overs)
Kyle Coetzer 51 (63); Michael Yardy 3/41 (10 overs)		Craig Kieswetter 69 (65); Majid Haq 2/35 (10 overs)

England won by 7 wickets
Grange Cricket Club, Raeburn Place, Edinburgh
Umpires: Aleem Dar (Pak) and Ian Ramage (Sco)

- Scotland won the toss and chose to bat.
