= 2010 Montreux Volley Masters =

Women's volleyball tournament

The 2010 Montreux Volley Masters was held in Montreux, Switzerland between 8–13 June 2010. Eight teams participated in this tournament.

== Participating teams ==
Group A	Group B
Germany; Japan; Russia; United States	China; Cuba; Netherlands; Poland

== Group stage ==
=== Group A ===
==== Table ====
Pos	Team	Pld	W	L	Pts	SW	SL	SR	SPW	SPL	SPR	Qualification
1	Russia	3	3	0	6	9	1	9.000	247	198	1.247	Semifinals
2	United States	3	2	1	5	7	4	1.750	258	264	0.977	Semifinals
3	Japan	3	1	2	4	3	6	0.500	223	235	0.949	
4	Germany	3	0	3	3	2	9	0.222	248	279	0.889	

==== Results ====
8 June
Japan	0:3	United States	(23:25; 23:25; 21:25)
9 June
United States	3:1	Germany	(19:25; 35:33; 25:20; 25:22)
Russia	3:0	Japan	(25:16; 25:19; 25:21)
10 June
Russia	3:0	Germany	(25:21; 25:21; 25:21)
11 June
Germany	1:3	Japan	(24:26; 26:24; 19:25; 16:25)
United States	1:3	Russia	(25:22; 13:25; 23:25; 18:25)

=== Group B ===
==== Table ====
Pos	Team	Pld	W	L	Pts	SW	SL	SR	SPW	SPL	SPR	Qualification
1	Cuba	3	3	0	6	9	3	3.000	276	259	1.066	Semifinals
2	China	3	2	1	5	8	3	2.667	256	224	1.143	Semifinals
3	Netherlands	3	1	2	4	4	7	0.571	237	254	0.933	
4	Poland	3	0	3	3	1	9	0.111	209	241	0.867	

==== Results ====
8 June
Cuba	3:1	Netherlands	(25:18; 25:22; 17:25; 25:23)
China	3:0	Poland	(25:17; 25:23; 25:17)
9 June
Netherlands	0:3	China	(19:25; 20:25; 19:25)
10 June
Poland	1:3	Netherlands	(23:25; 25:16; 16:25; 23:25)
China	2:3	Cuba	(26:28; 25:22; 22:25; 25:19; 8:15)
11 June
Cuba	3:0	Poland	(25:22; 25:21; 25:22)

== Classification round ==
5–8th place
2010-06-12 – Montreux
Japan	1
Poland	3
2010-06-12 – Montreux
Netherlands	3
Germany	1

5th place
2010-06-13 – Montreux
Poland	3
Netherlands	0

=== 5th–8th place ===
12 June
Japan	1:3	Poland	(24:26; 25:23; 20:25; 16:25)
Netherlands	3:1	Germany	(25:20; 25:16; 17:25; 25:19)

=== 5th–6th place ===
13 June
Poland	3:0	Netherlands	(25:21; 25:22; 25:12)

== Final round ==
Semifinals
2010-06-12 – Montreux
Russia	1
China	3
2010-06-12 – Montreux
Cuba	0
United States	3

Final
2010-06-13 – Montreux
China	3
United States	1
3rd place
2010-06-13 – Montreux
Russia	0
Cuba	3

=== Semifinals ===
12 June
Russia	1:3	China	(25:19; 21:25; 21:25; 23:25)
Cuba	0:3	United States	(18:25; 23:25; 27:29)

=== 3rd place match ===
13 June
Russia	0:3	Cuba	(13:25; 18:25; 25:27)

=== Final ===
13 June
China	3:1	United States	(23:25; 29:27; 25:22; 25 :20)

== Final standings ==
Rank	Team
1st place, gold medalist(s)	China
2nd place, silver medalist(s)	United States
3rd place, bronze medalist(s)	Cuba
4	Russia
5	Poland
6	Netherlands
7	Germany
7	Japan

== Awards ==
Winners:

- MVP: (Cuba) Kenia Carcaces
- Best scorer: (Cuba) Kenia Carcaces
- Best spiker: (Russia) Tatiana Kosheleva
- Best blocker: (Poland) Berenika Okuniewska
- Best setter: (China) Wei Qiuyue
- Best server: (China) Chen Liyi
- Best receiver: (China) Hui Ruoqi
- Best libero: (United States) Nicole Davis
