= 2010 Europe Cup (badminton) =

Official logo

The 2010 Europe Cup in badminton was the 33rd edition of the Europe Cup. It was held between June 23–27, 2010, in the ZBC-Hal, in Zwolle, Netherlands. 1.BC Saarbrücken won the tournament for the first time.

== Draw ==
The draw was held on June 14, 2010, at Zwolle, Netherlands.

== Format ==
21 teams competed for the title. They were split into 4 groups of 4 teams and 1 group with 5 teams. The Top team of each group advanced to the Quarterfinals. The winners of group A, B and D had a Bye to the Semifinals while the winners of Group C and E played against each other for the final spot in the Semis.

== Group stage ==
Qualified for Quarterfinals

=== Group A ===
Team	Pts	Pld	W	L	MF	MA
(Russia) Favorite-Ramenskoe	3	3	3	0	18	3
(Austria) ASKÖ Traun	2	3	2	1	10	11
(Czech Republic) Vesely Brno	1	3	1	2	11	10
(Iceland) Hafnarfjardar	0	3	0	3	3	18

June 23, 2010
Favorite-Ramenskoe (Russia)	7–0	(Iceland) Hafnarfjardar
ASKÖ Traun (Austria)	4–3	(Czech Republic) Vesely Brno
June 24, 2010
Favorite-Ramenskoe (Russia)	6–1	(Austria) ASKÖ Traun
Hafnarfjardar (Iceland)	1–6	(Czech Republic) Vesely Brno
June 25, 2010
Favorite-Ramenskoe (Russia)	5–2	(Czech Republic) Vesely Brno
Hafnarfjardar (Iceland)	2–5	(Austria) ASKÖ Traun

=== Group B ===
Team	Pts	Pld	W	L	MF	MA
(Russia) Nizhni Novgorod	3	3	3	0	19	2
(Netherlands) Van Zundert VELO	2	3	2	1	16	5
(Italy) Diesse-Mediterranea	1	3	1	2	5	16
(Portugal) Desportivo Estreito	0	3	0	3	2	19

June 23, 2010
Nizhni Novgorod (Russia)	7–0	(Italy) Diesse-Mediterranea
Desportivo Estreito (Portugal)	0–7	(Netherlands) Van Zundert VELO
June 24, 2010
Nizhni Novgorod (Russia)	7–0	(Portugal) Desportivo Estreito
Diesse-Mediterranea (Italy)	0–7	(Netherlands) Van Zundert VELO
June 25, 2010
Nizhni Novgorod (Russia)	5–2	(Netherlands) Van Zundert VELO
Diesse-Mediterranea (Italy)	5–2	(Portugal) Desportivo Estreito

=== Group C ===
Team	Pts	Pld	W	L	MF	MA
(Spain) Soderinsa Rinconada	3	3	3	0	16	5
(Switzerland) Adliswil-Zürich	2	3	2	1	12	9
(Ukraine) SHVSM Kharkov	1	3	1	2	13	8
(Scotland) Western	0	3	0	3	1	20

June 23, 2010
Soderinsa Rinconada (Spain)	7–0	(Scotland) Western
BV Adliswil (Switzerland)	4–3	(Ukraine) SHVSM Kharkov
June 24, 2010
Soderinsa Rinconada (Spain)	5–2	(Switzerland) BV Adliswil
Western (Scotland)	0–7	(Ukraine) SHVSM Kharkov
June 25, 2010
Soderinsa Rinconada (Spain)	4–3	(Ukraine) SHVSM Kharkov
Western (Scotland)	1–6	(Switzerland) BV Adliswil

=== Group D ===
Team	Pts	Pld	W	L	MF	MA
(France) Issy Les Moulineaux	4	4	4	0	26	2
(Republic of Ireland) Mount Pleasant	3	4	3	1	16	12
(Netherlands) BV Van Zijderveld	2	4	2	2	17	11
(Turkey) B.B. Ankaraspor	1	4	1	3	9	19
(Luxembourg) Fiederball Scheffleng	0	4	0	4	2	26

June 23, 2010
Issy Les Moulineaux (France)	6–1	(Republic of Ireland) Mount Pleasant
Fiederball Scheffleng (Luxembourg)	2–5	(Turkey) B.B. Ankaraspor
Issy Les Moulineaux (France)	7–0	(Luxembourg) Fiederball Scheffleng
Mount Pleasant (Republic of Ireland)	4–3	(Netherlands) BV Van Zijderveld
June 24, 2010
Issy Les Moulineaux (France)	7–0	(Turkey) B.B. Ankaraspor
Fiederball Scheffleng (Luxembourg)	0–7	(Netherlands) BV Van Zijderveld
June 25, 2010
Issy Les Moulineaux (France)	6–1	(Netherlands) BV Van Zijderveld
Mount Pleasant (Republic of Ireland)	4–3	(Turkey) B.B. Ankaraspor
Mount Pleasant (Republic of Ireland)	7–0	(Luxembourg) Fiederball Scheffleng
B.B. Ankaraspor (Turkey)	1–6	(Netherlands) BV Van Zijderveld

=== Group E ===
Team	Pts	Pld	W	L	MF	MA
(Germany) 1. BC Saarbrücken	3	3	3	0	19	2
(Belgium) BC Saive	2	3	2	1	12	9
(Finland) Helsingfors BC	1	3	1	2	9	12
(Bulgaria) SK Badminton	0	3	0	3	2	19

June 23, 2010
1. BC Saarbrücken (Germany)	7–0	(Bulgaria) SK Badminton
Helsingfors BC (Finland)	2–5	(Belgium) BC Saive
June 24, 2010
1. BC Saarbrücken (Germany)	6–1	(Finland) Helsingfors BC
SK Badminton (Bulgaria)	1–6	(Belgium) BC Saive
June 25, 2010
1. BC Saarbrücken (Germany)	6–1	(Belgium) BC Saive
SK Badminton (Bulgaria)	1–6	(Finland) Helsingfors BC

== Knockout stage ==
Quarter-finals
(Russia) Favorit-Ramenskoe
Bye
(France) Issy Les Moulineaux
Bye
June 26, 2010
(Germany) 1. BC Saarbrücken	4
(Spain) Soderinsa Rinconada	0
Bye
(Russia) Nizhni Novgorod

Semi-finals
June 26, 2010
(Russia) Favorit-Ramenskoe	4
(France) Issy Les Moulineaux	0
June 26, 2010
(Germany) 1. BC Saarbrücken	4
(Russia) Nizhni Novgorod	2

Final
June 27, 2010
(Russia) Favorit-Ramenskoe	2
(Germany) 1. BC Saarbrücken	4
