= 2010 French Open – Women's singles qualifying =

Women's singles qualifying
- 2010 French Open

Events
| Singles | men | women | | boys | girls |
| Doubles | men | women | mixed | boys | girls |
| WC Singles | men | women | quad |
| WC Doubles | men | women | quad |
| Legends | −45 | 45+ | women |

Qualification
| Singles | men | women |
- French Open

== Seeds ==
1. (Czech Republic) Renata Voráčová (second round)
2. (Russia) Anna Lapushchenkova (first round)
3. (Romania) Edina Gallovits (second round)
4. (Netherlands) Arantxa Rus (second round)
5. (Slovakia) Zuzana Kučová (qualifying competition)
6. (Serbia) Bojana Jovanovski (second round)
7. (Russia) Ksenia Pervak (qualified)
8. (Portugal) Michelle Larcher de Brito (second round)
9. (Romania) Simona Halep (qualified)
10. (Estonia) Kaia Kanepi (qualified)
11. (Canada) Valérie Tétreault (first round)
12. (Slovenia) Maša Zec Peškirič (first round)
13. (Russia) Evgeniya Rodina (qualifying competition)
14. (United States) Bethanie Mattek-Sands (qualifying competition, lucky loser)
15. (Austria) Patricia Mayr (first round)
16. (China) Zhang Shuai (qualified)
17. (United States) Lilia Osterloh (first round)
18. (Netherlands) Michaëlla Krajicek (qualifying competition)
19. (Romania) Monica Niculescu (qualifying competition)
20. (South Africa) Chanelle Scheepers (qualified)
21. (Russia) Nina Bratchikova (first round)
22. (Germany) Kathrin Wörle (qualifying competition)
23. (Kazakhstan) Sesil Karatantcheva (first round)
24. (Russia) Vesna Manasieva (qualifying competition)

== Qualifiers ==
1. (Canada) Heidi El Tabakh
2. (Japan) Kurumi Nara
3. (Russia) Ekaterina Ivanova
4. (Australia) Sophie Ferguson
5. (China) Zhang Shuai
6. (Russia) Anastasia Pivovarova
7. (Russia) Ksenia Pervak
8. (Japan) Misaki Doi
9. (Romania) Simona Halep
10. (Estonia) Kaia Kanepi
11. (Spain) Nuria Llagostera Vives
12. (South Africa) Chanelle Scheepers

== Lucky loser ==
1. (United States) Bethanie Mattek-Sands

== Qualifying draw ==
Key

- Q = Qualifier
- WC = Wild card
- LL = Lucky loser
- Alt = Alternate
- ITF = ITF entry
- PR = Protected ranking
- SR = Special ranking
- SE = Special exempt
- JE = Junior exempt
- JR = Junior Accelerator Programme entrant
- CO = College Accelerator Programme entrant
- NG = Next Gen Accelerator Program entrant
- w/o = Walkover
- r = Retired
- d = Defaulted

=== First qualifier ===
First round
1 | (Czech Republic) Renata Voráčová | 7 | 7
(Canada) Rebecca Marino | 5 | 5
(Hungary) Anikó Kapros | 6 | 5 | 6
(France) Séverine Beltrame | 3 | 7 | 3
(Japan) Junri Namigata | 6 | 7
(Austria) Nikola Hofmanova | 3 | 6^{5}
(Canada) Heidi El Tabakh | 5 | 6 | 6
23 | (Kazakhstan) Sesil Karatantcheva | 7 | 4 | 4

Second round
1 | (Czech Republic) Renata Voráčová | 7 | 5 | 2
(Hungary) Anikó Kapros | 6^{2} | 7 | 6
(Japan) Junri Namigata | 4 | 5
(Canada) Heidi El Tabakh | 6 | 7

Qualifying competition
(Hungary) Anikó Kapros | 1 | 1
(Canada) Heidi El Tabakh | 6 | 6

=== Second qualifier ===
First round
2 | (Russia) Anna Lapushchenkova | 5 | 1
(China) Han Xinyun | 7 | 6
(Ukraine) Yuliana Fedak | 2 | 4
(Japan) Kurumi Nara | 6 | 6
(Spain) Eva Fernández-Brugués | 5 | 4
Alt | (Ukraine) Irina Buryachok | 7 | 6
(Russia) Ksenia Lykina | 1 | 3
19 | (Romania) Monica Niculescu | 6 | 6

Second round
(China) Han Xinyun | 2 | 4
(Japan) Kurumi Nara | 6 | 6
Alt | (Ukraine) Irina Buryachok | 2 | 2
19 | (Romania) Monica Niculescu | 6 | 6

Qualifying competition
(Japan) Kurumi Nara | 4 | 7 | 10
19 | (Romania) Monica Niculescu | 6 | 6^{3} | 8

=== Third qualifier ===
First round
3 | (Romania) Edina Gallovits | 6 | 6
(Italy) Romina Oprandi | 3 | 2
(Australia) Shannon Golds | 4 | 2
(Georgia (country)) Oksana Kalashnikova | 6 | 6
(Slovakia) Kristína Kučová | 3 | 5
(United States) Julia Cohen | 6 | 7
(Russia) Ekaterina Ivanova | 4 | 6 | 6
21 | (Russia) Nina Bratchikova | 6 | 4 | 3

Second round
3 | (Romania) Edina Gallovits | 5 | 2
(Georgia (country)) Oksana Kalashnikova | 7 | 6
(United States) Julia Cohen | 2 | 3
(Russia) Ekaterina Ivanova | 6 | 6

Qualifying competition
(Georgia (country)) Oksana Kalashnikova | 1 | 6
(Russia) Ekaterina Ivanova | 6 | 7

=== Fourth qualifier ===
First round
4 | (Netherlands) Arantxa Rus | 6 | 6
WC | (France) Yulia Fedossova | 2 | 2
(Spain) Lourdes Domínguez Lino | 6 | 7
(Colombia) Catalina Castaño | 1 | 5
(Ukraine) Olga Savchuk | 4 | 2
(Australia) Sophie Ferguson | 6 | 6
(Ukraine) Lesia Tsurenko | 6 | 6
17 | (United States) Lilia Osterloh | 3 | 1

Second round
4 | (Netherlands) Arantxa Rus | 4 | 6^{4}
(Spain) Lourdes Domínguez Lino | 6 | 7
(Australia) Sophie Ferguson | 3 | 7 | 7
(Ukraine) Lesia Tsurenko | 6 | 5 | 5

Qualifying competition
(Spain) Lourdes Domínguez Lino | 4 | 3
(Australia) Sophie Ferguson | 6 | 6

=== Fifth qualifier ===
First round
5 | (Slovakia) Zuzana Kučová | 6 | 6
(Georgia (country)) Margalita Chakhnashvili | 2 | 1
(Belarus) Anastasiya Yakimova | 6 | 6
(Italy) Corinna Dentoni | 3 | 2
(Spain) Beatriz García Vidagany | 6 | 7
(United Kingdom) Naomi Cavaday | 3 | 5
(China) Zhou Yimiao | 2 | 2
16 | (China) Zhang Shuai | 6 | 6

Second round
5 | (Slovakia) Zuzana Kučová | 6 | 5 | 6
(Belarus) Anastasiya Yakimova | 2 | 7 | 1
(Spain) Beatriz García Vidagany | 6 | 4 | 3
16 | (China) Zhang Shuai | 4 | 6 | 6

Qualifying competition
5 | (Slovakia) Zuzana Kučová | 2 | 4
16 | (China) Zhang Shuai | 6 | 6

=== Sixth qualifier ===
First round
6 | (Serbia) Bojana Jovanovski | 6 | 6
(Argentina) María Irigoyen | 2 | 1
(Russia) Anastasia Pivovarova | 7 | 5 | 6
WC | (France) Claire de Gubernatis | 6^{5} | 7 | 3
(Poland) Marta Domachowska | 6 | 6
WC | (France) Caroline Garcia | 3 | 0
(Spain) Laura Pous Tió | 6 | 3 | 5
18 | (Netherlands) Michaëlla Krajicek | 1 | 6 | 7

Second round
6 | (Serbia) Bojana Jovanovski | 3 | 6 | 2
(Russia) Anastasia Pivovarova | 6 | 2 | 6
(Poland) Marta Domachowska | 4 | 7 | 3
18 | (Netherlands) Michaëlla Krajicek | 6 | 6^{5} | 6

Qualifying competition
(Russia) Anastasia Pivovarova | 6 | 6^{5} | 6
18 | (Netherlands) Michaëlla Krajicek | 4 | 7 | 2

=== Seventh qualifier ===
First round
7 | (Russia) Ksenia Pervak | 7 | 6
(Russia) Elena Chalova | 5 | 4
(Japan) Ryoko Fuda | 6 | 4 | 4
(Czech Republic) Andrea Hlaváčková | 2 | 6 | 6
PR | (Estonia) Margit Rüütel | 2 | 3
WC | (France) Stéphanie Vongsouthi | 6 | 6
(Italy) Anna Floris | 5 | 0
13 | (Russia) Evgeniya Rodina | 7 | 6

Second round
7 | (Russia) Ksenia Pervak | 2 | 6 | 7
(Czech Republic) Andrea Hlaváčková | 6 | 4 | 5
WC | (France) Stéphanie Vongsouthi | 1 | 4
13 | (Russia) Evgeniya Rodina | 6 | 6

Qualifying competition
7 | (Russia) Ksenia Pervak | 7 | 6
13 | (Russia) Evgeniya Rodina | 5 | 3

=== Eighth qualifier ===
First round
8 | (Portugal) Michelle Larcher de Brito | 6 | 6
(Australia) Olivia Rogowska | 3 | 2
(Luxembourg) Mandy Minella | 2 | 4
(Japan) Misaki Doi | 6 | 6
(Russia) Arina Rodionova | 3 | 6 | 6
(Russia) Alexandra Panova | 6 | 4 | 1
(Russia) Vitalia Diatchenko | 4 | 6 | 7
15 | (Austria) Patricia Mayr | 6 | 3 | 5

Second round
8 | (Portugal) Michelle Larcher de Brito | 6 | 4 | 4
(Japan) Misaki Doi | 4 | 6 | 6
(Russia) Arina Rodionova | 0 | 6 | 9
(Russia) Vitalia Diatchenko | 6 | 2 | 11

Qualifying competition
(Japan) Misaki Doi | 7 | 6
(Russia) Vitalia Diatchenko | 6 | 0

=== Ninth qualifier ===
First round
9 | (Romania) Simona Halep | 6 | 7
(Belarus) Darya Kustova | 0 | 6^{2}
(Greece) Eleni Daniilidou | 2 | 0
(United States) Madison Brengle | 6 | 6
(Russia) Elena Bovina | 7 | 6
WC | (France) Irena Pavlovic | 5 | 3
(Croatia) Ajla Tomljanović | 0 | 7 | 4
14 | (United States) Bethanie Mattek-Sands | 6 | 6^{5} | 6

Second round
9 | (Romania) Simona Halep | 6 | 6
(United States) Madison Brengle | 3 | 0
(Russia) Elena Bovina | 3 | 6 | 4
14 | (United States) Bethanie Mattek-Sands | 6 | 3 | 6

Qualifying competition
9 | (Romania) Simona Halep | 6 | 6^{7} | 6
14 | (United States) Bethanie Mattek-Sands | 4 | 7 | 4

=== Tenth qualifier ===
First round
10 | (Estonia) Kaia Kanepi | 5 | 6 | 6
(Belarus) Ekaterina Dzehalevich | 7 | 4 | 4
WC | (France) Estelle Guisard | 6 | 6^{4} | 6
(Kazakhstan) Zarina Diyas | 2 | 7 | 8
(United States) Alison Riske | 6^{4} | 0
(Georgia (country)) Anna Tatishvili | 7 | 6
(United States) Alexa Glatch | 4 | 2
24 | (Russia) Vesna Manasieva | 6 | 6

Second round
10 | (Estonia) Kaia Kanepi | 6 | 6
(Kazakhstan) Zarina Diyas | 1 | 0
(Georgia (country)) Anna Tatishvili | 2 | 3
24 | (Russia) Vesna Manasieva | 6 | 6

Qualifying competition
10 | (Estonia) Kaia Kanepi | 6 | 6
24 | (Russia) Vesna Manasieva | 0 | 0

=== Eleventh qualifier ===
First round
11 | (Canada) Valérie Tétreault | 1 | 1
(Spain) Nuria Llagostera Vives | 6 | 6
WC | (France) Anaïs Laurendon | 6^{10} | 6 | 6
(Japan) Tomoko Yonemura | 7 | 4 | 0
(Germany) Julia Schruff | 7 | 4 | 0
(Belarus) Iryna Kuryanovich | 6^{3} | 6 | 6
(Kazakhstan) Galina Voskoboeva | 6 | 4 | 2
22 | (Germany) Kathrin Wörle | 3 | 6 | 6

Second round
(Spain) Nuria Llagostera Vives | 6 | 6
WC | (France) Anaïs Laurendon | 1 | 1
(Belarus) Iryna Kuryanovich | 7 | 3 | 4
22 | (Germany) Kathrin Wörle | 5 | 6 | 6

Qualifying competition
(Spain) Nuria Llagostera Vives | 7 | 7
22 | (Germany) Kathrin Wörle | 6^{3} | 5

=== Twelfth qualifier ===
First round
12 | (Slovenia) Maša Zec Peškirič | 5 | 1
WC | (France) Nathalie Piquion | 7 | 6
(Czech Republic) Zuzana Ondrášková | 6 | 6
(Czech Republic) Eva Hrdinová | 1 | 4
(Spain) Sílvia Soler Espinosa | 6 | 6
(Hungary) Katalin Marosi | 2 | 4
(United States) Lindsay Lee-Waters | 4 | 4
20 | (South Africa) Chanelle Scheepers | 6 | 6

Second round
WC | (France) Nathalie Piquion | 4 | 1
(Czech Republic) Zuzana Ondrášková | 6 | 6
(Spain) Sílvia Soler Espinosa | 1 | 2
20 | (South Africa) Chanelle Scheepers | 6 | 6

Qualifying competition
(Czech Republic) Zuzana Ondrášková | 6 | 6^{5} | 0
20 | (South Africa) Chanelle Scheepers | 4 | 7 | 6
