= 2010 French Open – Men's singles qualifying =

Men's singles qualifying
- 2010 French Open

Events
| Singles | men | women | | boys | girls |
| Doubles | men | women | mixed | boys | girls |
| WC Singles | men | women | quad |
| WC Doubles | men | women | quad |
| Legends | −45 | 45+ | women |

Qualification
| Singles | men | women |
- French Open

This article displays the qualifying draw for men's singles at the 2010 French Open.

== Seeds ==
1. (United States) Robby Ginepri (moved to main draw)
2. (Portugal) Frederico Gil (second round)
3. (Portugal) Rui Machado (second round)
4. (Brazil) Marcos Daniel (first round)
5. (Brazil) Thiago Alves (qualified)
6. (India) Somdev Devvarman (qualified)
7. (Spain) Iván Navarro (first round)
8. (Germany) Björn Phau (first round)
9. (Russia) Teymuraz Gabashvili (qualified)
10. (Argentina) José Acasuso (qualifying competition, retired)
11. (Austria) Stefan Koubek (first round)
12. (Spain) Rubén Ramírez Hidalgo (second round)
13. (Italy) Filippo Volandri (first round)
14. (Spain) Santiago Ventura (qualifying competition, lucky loser)
15. (Italy) Simone Bolelli (qualified)
16. (Spain) Alberto Martín (first round)
17. (Brazil) João Souza (second round)
18. (Turkey) Marsel İlhan (qualifying round)
19. (Belgium) Christophe Rochus (first round)
20. (Serbia) Ilija Bozoljac (second round)
21. (Israel) Harel Levy (second round)
22. (Kazakhstan) Mikhail Kukushkin (second round)
23. (Argentina) Federico Delbonis (first round)
24. (Czech Republic) Jan Hernych (first round)
25. (United States) Kevin Kim (second round)
26. (Slovenia) Grega Žemlja (qualified)
27. (Spain) Albert Ramos Viñolas (second round)
28. (Paraguay) Ramón Delgado (second round)
29. (Spain) Pablo Andújar (qualified)
30. (France) Guillaume Rufin (first round)
31. (United States) Michael Yani (qualified)
32. (Algeria) Lamine Ouahab (first round)
33. (Netherlands) Igor Sijsling (first round)

== Qualifiers ==
1. (Spain) Pablo Andújar
2. (Kazakhstan) Yuri Schukin
3. (France) Olivier Patience
4. (United States) Jesse Witten
5. (Brazil) Thiago Alves
6. (India) Somdev Devvarman
7. (United States) Michael Yani
8. (Italy) Stefano Galvani
9. (Russia) Teymuraz Gabashvili
10. (Chile) Jorge Aguilar
11. (France) Benoît Paire
12. (Austria) Martin Fischer
13. (Germany) Julian Reister
14. (Slovenia) Grega Žemlja
15. (Italy) Simone Bolelli
16. (Germany) Tobias Kamke

== Lucky losers ==
1. (Spain) Santiago Ventura
2. (Germany) Dieter Kindlmann

== Qualifying draw ==
Key

- Q = Qualifier
- WC = Wild card
- LL = Lucky loser
- Alt = Alternate
- ITF = ITF entry
- PR = Protected ranking
- SR = Special ranking
- SE = Special exempt
- JE = Junior exempt
- JR = Junior Accelerator Programme entrant
- CO = College Accelerator Programme entrant
- NG = Next Gen Accelerator Program entrant
- w/o = Walkover
- r = Retired
- d = Defaulted

=== First qualifier ===
First round
33 | (Netherlands) Igor Sijsling | 4 | 3
WC | (France) Nicolas Devilder | 6 | 6
(France) Jonathan Dasnières | 6 | 7^{7}
(Austria) Philipp Oswald | 3 | 6^{1}
WC | (France) Julien Obry | 6^{5} | 7^{7} | 6
(Spain) Adrián Menéndez | 7^{7} | 6^{3} | 8
(United Kingdom) James Ward | 4 | 6 | 3
29 | (Spain) Pablo Andújar | 6 | 3 | 6

Second round
WC | (France) Nicolas Devilder | 6 | 6
(France) Jonathan Dasnières | 1 | 4
(Spain) Adrián Menéndez | 3 | 4
29 | (Spain) Pablo Andújar | 6 | 6

Qualifying competition
WC | (France) Nicolas Devilder | 6 | 5 | 2
29 | (Spain) Pablo Andújar | 1 | 7 | 6

=== Second qualifier ===
First round
2 | (Portugal) Frederico Gil | 5
(Austria) Andreas Haider-Maurer | 6^{r}
(Slovakia) Dominik Hrbatý | 2 | 7 | 5
(Slovakia) Martin Kližan | 6 | 5 | 7
(Kazakhstan) Yuri Schukin | 6 | 6
(Australia) Matthew Ebden | 4 | 4
(India) Prakash Amritraj | 6 | 2 | 6
17 | (Brazil) João Souza | 4 | 6 | 8

Second round
2 | (Portugal) Frederico Gil | 3 | 3
(Slovakia) Martin Kližan | 6 | 6
(Kazakhstan) Yuri Schukin | 6 | 6^{4} | 6
17 | (Brazil) João Souza | 4 | 7^{7} | 2

Qualifying competition
(Slovakia) Martin Kližan | 2 | 4
(Kazakhstan) Yuri Schukin | 6 | 6

=== Third qualifier ===
First round
3 | (Portugal) Rui Machado | 6 | 4 | 7
(Croatia) Ivan Dodig | 4 | 6 | 5
(France) Alexandre Sidorenko | 6 | 2 | 7
WC | (France) Laurent Rochette | 3 | 6 | 5
WC | (France) Olivier Patience | 6 | 6^{3} | 6
(Germany) Bastian Knittel | 3 | 7^{7} | 3
(Spain) Pedro Clar-Rosselló | 6 | 4 | 4
27 | (Spain) Albert Ramos Viñolas | 3 | 6 | 6

Second round
3 | (Portugal) Rui Machado | 6^{5} | 7 | 3
(France) Alexandre Sidorenko | 7^{7} | 5 | 6
WC | (France) Olivier Patience | 2 | 7^{7} | 6
27 | (Spain) Albert Ramos Viñolas | 6 | 6^{5} | 4

Qualifying competition
(France) Alexandre Sidorenko | 6 | 4 | 6
WC | (France) Olivier Patience | 4 | 6 | 8

=== Fourth qualifier ===
First round
4 | (Brazil) Marcos Daniel | 6^{2} | 6 | 15
(United States) Jesse Witten | 7^{7} | 4 | 17
(Australia) John Millman | 7 | 6
(Brazil) Caio Zampieri | 5 | 3
(Australia) Greg Jones | 6 | 4 | 0
(Slovakia) Pavol Červenák | 1 | 6 | 6
(France) Vincent Millot | 3 | 3
20 | (Serbia) Ilija Bozoljac | 6 | 6

Second round
(United States) Jesse Witten | 6 | 6
(Australia) John Millman | 2 | 1
(Slovakia) Pavol Červenák | 6^{5} | 7^{7} | 9
20 | (Serbia) Ilija Bozoljac | 7^{7} | 6^{5} | 7

Qualifying competition
(United States) Jesse Witten | 7 | 6
(Slovakia) Pavol Červenák | 5 | 2

=== Fifth qualifier ===
First round
5 | (Brazil) Thiago Alves | 6 | 6
(Germany) Dominik Meffert | 1 | 3
(Argentina) Gastón Gaudio | 6 | 7^{7}
(United States) Lester Cook | 2 | 6^{0}
(Croatia) Antonio Veić | 7 | 7
(Italy) Francesco Aldi | 5 | 5
(Romania) Adrian Ungur | 7^{10} | 1 | 3
22 | (Kazakhstan) Mikhail Kukushkin | 6^{8} | 6 | 6

Second round
5 | (Brazil) Thiago Alves | 6 | 6
(Argentina) Gastón Gaudio | 2 | 3
(Croatia) Antonio Veić | 6 | 7
22 | (Kazakhstan) Mikhail Kukushkin | 2 | 5

Qualifying competition
5 | (Brazil) Thiago Alves | 1 | 6 | 6
(Croatia) Antonio Veić | 6 | 4 | 3

=== Sixth qualifier ===
First round
6 | (India) Somdev Devvarman | 2 | 6 | 6
(Czech Republic) Jiří Vaněk | 6 | 2 | 4
(Australia) Chris Guccione | 3 | 3
(New Zealand) Daniel King-Turner | 6 | 6
(Colombia) Carlos Salamanca | 4 | 6^{2}
WC | (France) Adrian Mannarino | 6 | 7^{7}
(Canada) Peter Polansky | 2 | 6 | 7
28 | (Paraguay) Ramón Delgado | 6 | 0 | 9

Second round
6 | (India) Somdev Devvarman | 6 | 6
(New Zealand) Daniel King-Turner | 1 | 2
WC | (France) Adrian Mannarino | 6 | 7^{7}
28 | (Paraguay) Ramón Delgado | 2 | 6^{3}

Qualifying competition
6 | (India) Somdev Devvarman | 6 | 6
WC | (France) Adrian Mannarino | 4 | 1

=== Seventh qualifier ===
First round
7 | (Spain) Iván Navarro | 4 | 5
(Brazil) Ricardo Hocevar | 6 | 7
(Czech Republic) Dušan Lojda | 6 | 6
(Ecuador) Giovanni Lapentti | 2 | 1
(Germany) Simon Stadler | 6^{4} | 4
(Argentina) Diego Junqueira | 7^{7} | 6
(Argentina) Juan Pablo Brzezicki | 6^{6} | 6 | 1
31 | (United States) Michael Yani | 7^{8} | 4 | 6

Second round
(Brazil) Ricardo Hocevar | 7 | 6
(Czech Republic) Dušan Lojda | 5 | 3
(Argentina) Diego Junqueira | 4 | 6^{6}
31 | (United States) Michael Yani | 6 | 7^{8}

Qualifying competition
(Brazil) Ricardo Hocevar | 2 | 3
31 | (United States) Michael Yani | 6 | 6

=== Eighth qualifier ===
First round
8 | (Germany) Björn Phau | 4 | 4
(Italy) Stefano Galvani | 6 | 6
(Japan) Yuichi Sugita | 4 | 6^{5}
(Russia) Konstantin Kravchuk | 6 | 7^{7}
(United States) Ryan Harrison | 4 | 6 | 6
WC | (France) Éric Prodon | 6 | 3 | 4
(Argentina) Sebastián Decoud | 1 | 6 | 9
19 | (Belgium) Christophe Rochus | 6 | 3 | 7

Second round
(Italy) Stefano Galvani | 6^{10} | 6 | 13
(Russia) Konstantin Kravchuk | 7^{12} | 2 | 11
(United States) Ryan Harrison | 6^{6} | 6 | 6
(Argentina) Sebastián Decoud | 7^{8} | 2 | 4

Qualifying competition
(Italy) Stefano Galvani | 6 | 7^{7}
(United States) Ryan Harrison | 4 | 6^{4}

=== Ninth qualifier ===
First round
9 | (Russia) Teymuraz Gabashvili | 6 | 7^{7}
(Croatia) Roko Karanušić | 1 | 6^{3}
(France) Thierry Ascione | 6 | 7
(Ukraine) Ivan Sergeyev | 3 | 5
(Brazil) Júlio Silva | 4 | 3
(United States) Ryler DeHeart | 6 | 6
(Italy) Flavio Cipolla | 7^{7} | 7
23 | (Argentina) Federico Delbonis | 6^{5} | 5

Second round
9 | (Russia) Teymuraz Gabashvili | 6 | 6
(France) Thierry Ascione | 2 | 0
(United States) Ryler DeHeart | 4 | 6 | 6
(Italy) Flavio Cipolla | 6 | 3 | 4

Qualifying competition
9 | (Russia) Teymuraz Gabashvili | 7^{7} | 6
(United States) Ryler DeHeart | 6^{2} | 4

=== Tenth qualifier ===
First round
10 | (Argentina) José Acasuso | 7^{9} | 6
(Republic of Ireland) Louk Sorensen | 6^{7} | 4
(Spain) Arnau Brugués Davi | 3 | 1
(Spain) David Marrero | 6 | 6
(Belgium) Niels Desein | 4 | 2
(Chile) Jorge Aguilar | 6 | 6
PR | (Germany) Benedikt Dorsch | 1 | 1
25 | (United States) Kevin Kim | 6 | 6

Second round
10 | (Argentina) José Acasuso | 7^{12} | 6
(Spain) David Marrero | 6^{10} | 4
(Chile) Jorge Aguilar | 3 | 7^{9} | 7
25 | (United States) Kevin Kim | 6 | 6^{7} | 5

Qualifying competition
10 | (Argentina) José Acasuso | 4 | 0^{r}
(Chile) Jorge Aguilar | 6 | 3

=== Eleventh qualifier ===
First round
11 | (Austria) Stefan Koubek | 2 | 6 | 1
(France) Benoît Paire | 6 | 3 | 6
WC | (Sweden) Daniel Berta | 4 | 4
(Mexico) Santiago González | 6 | 6
(Hungary) Attila Balázs | 7 | 5 | 2
WC | (France) Charles-Antoine Brézac | 5 | 7 | 6
(Germany) Dieter Kindlmann | 6 | 6
32 | (Algeria) Lamine Ouahab | 2 | 1

Second round
(France) Benoît Paire | 7^{7} | 5 | 7
(Mexico) Santiago González | 6^{3} | 7 | 5
WC | (France) Charles-Antoine Brézac | 3 | 5
(Germany) Dieter Kindlmann | 6 | 7

Qualifying competition
(France) Benoît Paire | 6 | 6
(Germany) Dieter Kindlmann | 1 | 4

=== Twelfth qualifier ===
First round
12 | (Spain) Rubén Ramírez Hidalgo | 6^{3} | 6 | 6
(Chile) Paul Capdeville | 7^{7} | 4 | 0
(Austria) Martin Fischer | 6 | 6
(Belgium) Yannick Mertens | 3 | 0
(Lithuania) Ričardas Berankis | 6 | 6
(Morocco) Reda El Amrani | 2 | 4
(Romania) Victor Crivoi | 7 | 6
30 | (France) Guillaume Rufin | 5 | 3

Second round
12 | (Spain) Rubén Ramírez Hidalgo | 6^{5} | 3
(Austria) Martin Fischer | 7^{7} | 6
(Lithuania) Ričardas Berankis | 6 | 3 | 6
(Romania) Victor Crivoi | 2 | 6 | 0

Qualifying competition
(Austria) Martin Fischer | 3 | 6 | 7
(Lithuania) Ričardas Berankis | 6 | 4 | 5

=== Thirteenth qualifier ===
First round
13 | (Italy) Filippo Volandri | 3 | 7 | 1
(Germany) Julian Reister | 6 | 5 | 6
(Republic of Ireland) Conor Niland | 6 | 6
(United Kingdom) Alex Bogdanovic | 4 | 4
(France) Sébastien de Chaunac | 3 | 1
(Czech Republic) Lukáš Rosol | 6 | 6
(Argentina) Carlos Berlocq | 6 | 1 | 11
24 | (Czech Republic) Jan Hernych | 1 | 6 | 9

Second round
(Germany) Julian Reister | 6 | 6
(Republic of Ireland) Conor Niland | 2 | 4
(Czech Republic) Lukáš Rosol | 3 | 1
(Argentina) Carlos Berlocq | 6 | 6

Qualifying competition
(Germany) Julian Reister | 6 | 6
(Argentina) Carlos Berlocq | 4 | 3

=== Fourteenth qualifier ===
First round
14 | (Spain) Santiago Ventura | 2 | 6 | 6
(Monaco) Benjamin Balleret | 6 | 3 | 4
(Belgium) Ruben Bemelmans | 6 | 6
(Germany) Andre Begemann | 2 | 3
(Spain) Guillermo Alcaide | 6 | 6
(Italy) Riccardo Ghedin | 4 | 1
(Belarus) Uladzimir Ignatik | 7^{7} | 4 | 2
26 | (Slovenia) Grega Žemlja | 6^{3} | 6 | 6

Second round
14 | (Spain) Santiago Ventura | 6 | 7^{9}
(Belgium) Ruben Bemelmans | 0 | 6^{7}
(Spain) Guillermo Alcaide | 4 | 4
26 | (Slovenia) Grega Žemlja | 6 | 6

Qualifying competition
14 | (Spain) Santiago Ventura | 6 | 5 | 2
26 | (Slovenia) Grega Žemlja | 2 | 7 | 6

=== Fifteenth qualifier ===
First round
15 | (Italy) Simone Bolelli | 6 | 6
(Australia) Marinko Matosevic | 4 | 2
(Portugal) Leonardo Tavares | 3 | 1
Alt | (Czech Republic) Jan Minář | 6 | 6
WC | (France) Jonathan Eysseric | 6 | 2 | 4
(Spain) Roberto Bautista-Agut | 4 | 6 | 6
(Argentina) Martín Vassallo Argüello | 5 | 1^{r}
18 | (Turkey) Marsel İlhan | 7 | 2

Second round
15 | (Italy) Simone Bolelli | w/o
Alt | (Czech Republic) Jan Minář
(Spain) Roberto Bautista-Agut | 3 | 2
18 | (Turkey) Marsel İlhan | 6 | 6

Qualifying competition
15 | (Italy) Simone Bolelli | 5 | 7 | 6
18 | (Turkey) Marsel İlhan | 7 | 5 | 3

=== Sixteenth qualifier ===
First round
16 | (Spain) Alberto Martín | 3 | 3
(Germany) Tobias Kamke | 6 | 6
(Switzerland) Michael Lammer | 6 | 7
(Australia) Nick Lindahl | 2 | 5
(Argentina) Martín Alund | 6 | 2 | 1
(United States) Alex Bogomolov Jr. | 2 | 6 | 6
(Italy) Andrea Arnaboldi | 5 | 3
21 | (Israel) Harel Levy | 7 | 6

Second round
(Germany) Tobias Kamke | 7^{8} | 7
(Switzerland) Michael Lammer | 6^{6} | 5
(United States) Alex Bogomolov Jr. | 6 | 6
21 | (Israel) Harel Levy | 2 | 2

Qualifying competition
(Germany) Tobias Kamke | 6 | 6
(United States) Alex Bogomolov Jr. | 1 | 4
