= 2010 French Open – Day-by-day summaries =

Tennis competition results

This list is a below in the form of day-by-day summaries:

== Day 1 (23 May) ==
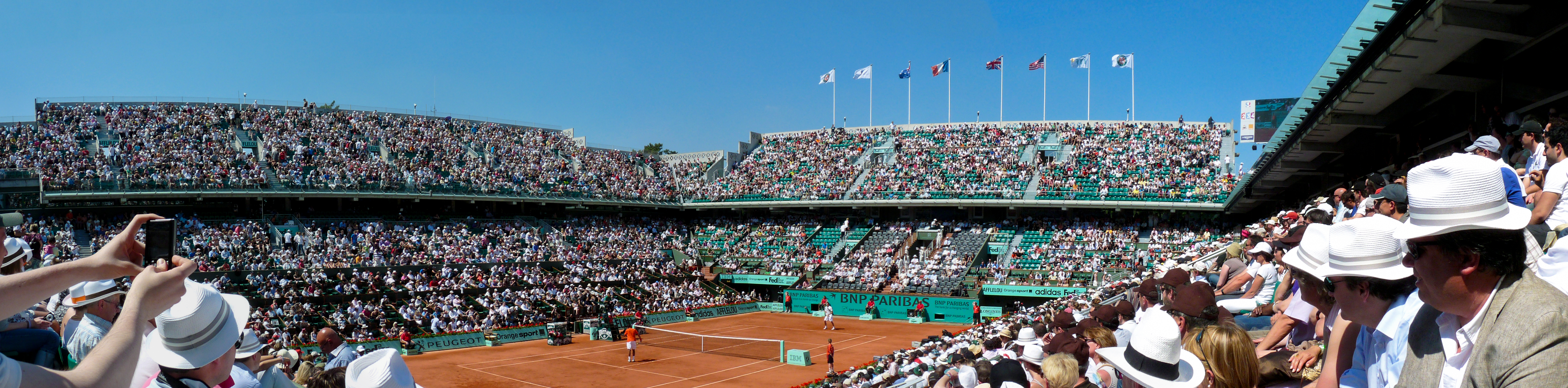
The Court Philippe Chatrier during the match between Jo-Wilfried Tsonga and Daniel Brands

In the Men's singles many of seeded players made it through led by 2009 finalist Robin Söderling, Mikhail Youzhny and Marin Čilić. While Jo-Wilfried Tsonga was pushed to the limit by German Daniel Brands as he came through 7–5 in the fifth. Tsonga was joined by compatriots Édouard Roger-Vasselin, Josselin Ouanna and Julien Benneteau who upset 23rd seed Ernests Gulbis 6–4, 6–2, 1–0 as Gulbis retired with a hamstring injury.

In the Women's side 6th seed and defending champion Svetlana Kuznetsova cruised through the first round with a 6–3, 6–1 victory of Sorana Cîrstea. She was joined by 2nd seed Venus Williams, Madrid champion Aravane Rezaï, Nadia Petrova, Flavia Pennetta, Maria Kirilenko and last years Semifinalist Dominika Cibulková. The day featured two upsets. Victoria Azarenka, hindered by an injury and only appeared in the event to have entered to claim the bonus prize money for ending the 2009 season in the top 10, became the first major casualty of the tournament as she was upset by Gisela Dulko. Rome champion María José Martínez Sánchez was also upset by Akgul Amanmuradova.

- Seeds out:
  - Men's Singles: (Latvia) Ernests Gulbis
  - Women's Singles: (Belarus) Victoria Azarenka, (Spain) María José Martínez Sánchez
- Schedule of Play

Matches on main courts
Matches on Court Philippe Chatrier (Center Court)
Event	Winner	Loser	Score
Women's Singles 1st round	(Russia) Svetlana Kuznetsova [6]	(Romania) Sorana Cîrstea	6–3, 6–1
Men's Singles 1st round	(Sweden) Robin Söderling [5]	(France) Laurent Recouderc [WC]	6–0, 6–2, 6–3
Women's Singles 1st round	(France) Aravane Rezaï [15]	(Canada) Heidi El Tabakh [Q]	6–1, 6–1
Men's Singles 1st round	(France) Jo-Wilfried Tsonga [8]	(Germany) Daniel Brands	4–6, 6–3, 6–2, 6–7, 7–5
Matches on Court Suzanne Lenglen (Grandstand)
Event	Winner	Loser	Score
Men's Singles 1st round	(Croatia) Marin Čilić [10]	(Brazil) Ricardo Mello	6–1, 3–6, 6–3, 6–1
Women's Singles 1st round	(Argentina) Gisela Dulko	(Belarus) Victoria Azarenka [10]	6–1, 6–2
Men's Singles 1st round	(France) Julien Benneteau	(Latvia) Ernests Gulbis [23]	6–4, 6–2, 1–0 retired
Women's Singles 1st round	(United States) Venus Williams [2]	(Switzerland) Patty Schnyder	6–3, 6–3
Women's Singles 1st round	(Russia) Nadia Petrova [19]	(China) Zhang Shuai	6–0, 6–3

== Day 2 (24 May) ==
In the Men's Singles World no. 1 and defending champion Roger Federer cruised past Peter Luczak with a 6–4, 6–1, 6–2 victory. He was joined by Indian Wells champion Ivan Ljubičić, Miami finalist Tomáš Berdych, Stanislas Wawrinka, John Isner and Thomaz Bellucci. While World no. 3 Novak Djokovic, last years semifinalist Fernando González, Gaël Monfils and Victor Hănescu all won in 4. While world no. 4 Andy Murray took on Richard Gasquet and won 4–6, 6–7, 6–4, 6–2, 6–1. 29th seed Spaniard Nicolás Almagro also needed five sets to defeat Robin Haase. The upsets of the day saw Spanish clay courters Feliciano López and Tommy Robredo both fall.

In the Women's draw 6 of the top 8 seeds were in action and all won. The field was led by World no. 1 Serena Williams who beat Stefanie Vögele 7–6, 6–2. She was joined by Caroline Wozniacki, Jelena Janković, Elena Dementieva, Samantha Stosur and Agnieszka Radwańska. Other seeds Li Na, Kateryna Bondarenko, Alisa Kleybanova and Lucie Šafářová who defeated Jelena Dokić all won in straight sets. While Francesca Schiavone and Alona Bondarenko come back from a set down to get to the second round.

- Seeds out:
  - Men's Singles: (Spain) Feliciano López, (Spain) Tommy Robredo
- Schedule of Play

Matches on main courts
Matches on Court Philippe Chatrier (Center Court)
Event	Winner	Loser	Score
Women's Singles 1st round	(Denmark) Caroline Wozniacki [3]	(Russia) Alla Kudryavtseva	6–0, 6–3
Men's Singles 1st round	(Switzerland) Roger Federer [1]	(Australia) Peter Luczak	6–4, 6–1, 6–2
Women's Singles 1st round	(United States) Serena Williams [1]	(Switzerland) Stefanie Vögele	7–6^{(7–2)}, 6–2
Men's Singles 1st round	(France) Gaël Monfils [13]	(Germany) Dieter Kindlmann [LL]	6–3, 7–5, 6–7^{(5–7)}, 6–2
Matches on Court Suzanne Lenglen (Grandstand)
Event	Winner	Loser	Score
Women's Singles 1st round	(China) Li Na [11]	(France) Kristina Mladenovic	7–5, 6–3
Men's Singles 1st round	(Serbia) Novak Djokovic [3]	(Kazakhstan) Evgeny Korolev	6–1, 3–6, 6–1, 6–3
Men's Singles 1st round	(United Kingdom) Andy Murray [4]	(France) Richard Gasquet	4–6, 6–7^{(5–7)}, 6–4, 6–2, 6–1

== Day 3 (25 May) ==
Day 3 of action was led by 4-time champion and 2nd seed Rafael Nadal who defeated Gianni Mina 6–2, 6–2, 6–2. Nadal was joined by fellow Spaniards 7th seed Fernando Verdasco, 16th seed Juan Carlos Ferrero, 9th seed David Ferrer and Pere Riba. Other seeds who went through were German Philipp Kohlschreiber, Austrian Jürgen Melzer and former world no. 1 Lleyton Hewitt. While 6th seed Andy Roddick who was playing his first match in clay of the season needed 5 sets to get past Jarkko Nieminen 6–2, 4–6, 4–6, 7–6, 6–3. Upsets were not avoided as two seeds fell in 4. As 18th seed Sam Querrey lost to compatriot Robby Ginepri and 26th seed clay courter Juan Mónaco was upset by Grega Žemlja.

In the Women's Singles almost all seeds got through in straight sets led by Justine Henin who beat Tsvetana Pironkova 6–4, 6–3, in her 1st match at RG for 3 years. She was joined by unseeded compatriots Kirsten Flipkens and Yanina Wickmayer, as well as Russians Maria Sharapova, Vera Zvonareva and Anastasia Pavlyuchenkova. Other seeds Daniela Hantuchová, Shahar Pe'er, Zheng Jie and Frenchwoman Marion Bartoli all won. The second major upset of the tournaments came at the cost of 2-time finalist Dinara Safina, who was upset by 39-year-old Kimiko Date-Krumm 3–6, 6–4, 7–5.

- Seeds out:
  - Men's Singles: (Argentina) Juan Mónaco, (United States) Sam Querrey
  - Women's Singles: (Russia) Dinara Safina
- Schedule of Play

Matches on main courts
Matches on Court Philippe Chatrier (Center Court)
Event	Winner	Loser	Score
Women's Singles 1st round	(Belgium) Justine Henin [22]	(Bulgaria) Tsvetana Pironkova	6–4, 6–3
Men's Singles 1st round	(United States) Andy Roddick [6]	(Finland) Jarkko Nieminen	6–2, 4–6, 4–6, 7–6^{(7–4)}, 6–3
Women's Singles 1st round	(France) Marion Bartoli [13]	(Italy) Maria Elena Camerin	6–2, 6–3
Men's Singles 1st round	(Australia) Lleyton Hewitt [28]	(France) Jérémy Chardy	7–5, 6–0, 6–4
Matches on Court Suzanne Lenglen (Grandstand)
Event	Winner	Loser	Score
Men's Singles 1st round	(Spain) Fernando Verdasco [7]	(Russia) Igor Kunitsyn	6–4, 6–2, 6–2
Women's Singles 1st round	(Japan) Kimiko Date-Krumm	(Russia) Dinara Safina [9]	3–6, 6–4, 7–5
Men's Singles 1st round	(Spain) Rafael Nadal [2]	(France) Gianni Mina	6–2, 6–2, 6–2
Women's Singles 1st round	(Russia) Maria Sharapova [12]	(Russia) Ksenia Pervak [Q]	6–3, 6–2

== Day 4 (26 May) ==
World no. 1 Roger Federer dispatched Colombian Alejandro Falla in straight sets. Other straight sets victors were Robin Söderling, Jo-Wilfried Tsonga, Marin Čilić, Tomáš Berdych, Stanislas Wawrinka and Albert Montañés. While Mikhail Youzhny progressed in four after losing the first set tie-break. The only upset of the day was when Thiemo de Bakker defeated 32nd seed Guillermo García-López. The end of the day saw lots of matches being suspended and cancelled due to rain delays. One of those matches was between Frenchman Gaël Monfils and Italian Fabio Fognini which descended into chaos as they played on despite extreme darkness for 2 games, before finally coming off court a full 25 minutes after Murray and Chela's match did, at 5–5 in the 5th.

World no. 2 Venus Williams led the days games in the women's side with a 6–2, 6–4 victory over Arantxa Parra Santonja, she was joined by Caroline Wozniacki, Flavia Pennetta, Nadia Petrova, Alexandra Dulgheru and Maria Kirilenko who all won straight sets. While Dominika Cibulková and Aravane Rezaï scrambled to win in three. One of the stories of the day was with defending champion Russian Svetlana Kuznetsova against German Andrea Petkovic, who served for the match in the 2nd set, but the Russian survived 4–6, 7–5, 6–4. As with the Men's side several matches were cancelled.

- Seeds out:
  - Men's Singles: (Spain) Guillermo García-López
  - Women's Singles: (Czech Republic) Lucie Šafářová
  - Men's Doubles: (United States) Eric Butorac / (United States) Rajeev Ram, (Sweden) Robert Lindstedt / (Romania) Horia Tecău
- Schedule of Play

Matches on main courts
Matches on Court Philippe Chatrier (Center Court)
Event	Winner	Loser	Score
Women's Singles 2nd round	(United States) Venus Williams [2]	(Spain) Arantxa Parra Santonja	6–2, 6–4
Men's Singles 2nd round	(Switzerland) Roger Federer [1]	(Colombia) Alejandro Falla	7–6^{(7–4)}, 6–2, 6–4
Matches on Court Suzanne Lenglen (Grandstand)
Event	Winner	Loser	Score
Men's Singles 2nd round	(Sweden) Robin Söderling [5]	(United States) Taylor Dent	6–0, 6–1, 6–1
Men's Singles 2nd round	(France) Jo-Wilfried Tsonga [8]	(France) Josselin Ouanna	6–0, 6–1, 6–4
Women's Singles 2nd round	(France) Aravane Rezaï [15]	(Germany) Angelique Kerber	6–2, 2–6, 6–3
Women's Singles 2nd round	(Denmark) Caroline Wozniacki [3]	(Italy) Tathiana Garbin	6–3, 6–1

== Day 5 (27 May) ==
- Seeds out:
  - Men's Singles: (France) Gaël Monfils
  - Women's Singles: (Ukraine) Kateryna Bondarenko, (Poland) Agnieszka Radwańska, (Russia) Vera Zvonareva
- Schedule of Play

Matches on main courts
Matches on Court Philippe Chatrier (Center Court)
Event	Winner	Loser	Score
Women's Singles 2nd round	(Serbia) Jelena Janković [4]	(Estonia) Kaia Kanepi [Q]	6–2, 3–6, 6–4
Men's Singles 2nd round	(Italy) Fabio Fognini	(France) Gaël Monfils [13]	2–6, 4–6, 7–5, 6–4, 9–7
Matches on Court Suzanne Lenglen (Grandstand)
Event	Winner	Loser	Score
Men's Singles 2nd round	(United States) Andy Roddick [6]	(Slovenia) Blaž Kavčič	6–3, 5–7, 6–4, 6–2

== Day 6 (28 May) ==
- Seeds out:
  - Men's Singles: (Cyprus) Marcos Baghdatis, (Chile) Fernando González, (United States) John Isner, (Spain) Albert Montañés
  - Women's Singles: (Slovakia) Dominika Cibulková, (Romania) Alexandra Dulgheru, (Russia) Svetlana Kuznetsova, (China) Li Na, (China) Zheng Jie
  - Men's Doubles:: (Sweden) Simon Aspelin / (Australia) Paul Hanley, (Spain) Marcel Granollers / (Spain) Tommy Robredo
  - Women's Doubles: (Russia) Vera Dushevina / (Russia) Ekaterina Makarova
  - Mixed Doubles: (China) Yan Zi / (Poland) Mariusz Fyrstenberg
- Schedule of Play

Matches on main courts
Matches on Court Philippe Chatrier (Center Court)
Event	Winner	Loser	Score
Men's Singles 2nd round	(Spain) Rafael Nadal [2]	(Argentina) Horacio Zeballos	6–2, 6–2, 6–3
Women's Singles 2nd round	(Belgium) Justine Henin [22]	(Czech Republic) Klára Zakopalová	6–3, 6–3
Women's Singles 3rd round	(United States) Venus Williams [2]	(Slovakia) Dominika Cibulková [26]	6–3, 6–4
Men's Singles 3rd round	(France) Jo-Wilfried Tsonga [8]	(Netherlands) Thiemo de Bakker	6–7^{(6–8)}, 7–6^{(7–4)}, 6–3, 6–4
Matches on Court Suzanne Lenglen (Grandstand)
Event	Winner	Loser	Score
Women's Singles 2nd round	(United States) Serena Williams [1]	(Germany) Julia Görges	6–1, 6–1
Women's Singles 2nd round	(France) Marion Bartoli [13]	(France) Olivia Sanchez [WC]	7–5, 6–2
Men's Singles 3rd round	(Switzerland) Roger Federer [1]	(Germany) Julian Reister [Q]	6–4, 6–0, 6–4
Men's Singles 3rd round	(United Kingdom) Andy Murray [4]	(Cyprus) Marcos Baghdatis [25]	6–2, 6–3, 0–6, 6–2
Women's Singles 3rd round	(Russia) Elena Dementieva [5]	(Canada) Aleksandra Wozniak	6–7^{(2–7)}, 6–3, 6–4

== Day 7 (29 May) ==
- Seeds out:
  - Men's Singles: (Spain) David Ferrer, (Spain) Juan Carlos Ferrero, (Romania) Victor Hănescu, (Australia) Lleyton Hewitt, (Germany) Philipp Kohlschreiber, (Croatia) Ivan Ljubičić, (United States) Andy Roddick
  - Women's Singles: (France) Marion Bartoli, (Ukraine) Alona Bondarenko, (Russia) Alisa Kleybanova, (Russia) Anastasia Pavlyuchenkova, (France) Aravane Rezaï, (Belgium) Yanina Wickmayer
  - Men's Doubles:: (India) Mahesh Bhupathi / (Belarus) Max Mirnyi, (United States) Bob Bryan / (United States) Mike Bryan, (United States) Mardy Fish / (The Bahamas) Mark Knowles
  - Mixed Doubles: (United States) Liezel Huber / (India) Mahesh Bhupathi, (United States) Lisa Raymond / (South Africa) Wesley Moodie, (United States) Bethanie Mattek-Sands / (The Bahamas) Mark Knowles
- Schedule of Play

Matches on main courts
Matches on Court Philippe Chatrier (Center Court)
Event	Winner	Loser	Score
Women's Singles 3rd round	(United States) Serena Williams [1]	(Russia) Anastasia Pavlyuchenkova [29]	6–1, 1–6, 6–2
Women's Singles 3rd round	(Russia) Nadia Petrova [19]	(France) Aravane Rezaï [15]	7–6^{(7–2)}, 4–6, 10–8
Men's Singles 3rd round	(Serbia) Novak Djokovic [3]	(Romania) Victor Hănescu [31]	6–3, 3–6, 6–3, 6–2
Men's Singles 3rd round	(Spain) Rafael Nadal [2]	(Australia) Lleyton Hewitt [28]	6–3, 6–4, 6–3
Matches on Court Suzanne Lenglen (Grandstand)
Event	Winner	Loser	Score
Men's Singles 3rd round	(Russia) Teymuraz Gabashvili [Q]	(United States) Andy Roddick [6]	6–4, 6–4, 6–2
Women's Singles 3rd round	(Israel) Shahar Pe'er [18]	(France) Marion Bartoli [13]	7–6^{(9–7)}, 6–2
Men's Singles 3rd round	(Spain) Fernando Verdasco [7]	(Germany) Philipp Kohlschreiber [30]	2–6, 6–3, 6–3, 6–7^{(1–7)}, 6–4
Women's Singles 3rd round	(Serbia) Jelena Janković [4]	(Ukraine) Alona Bondarenko [27]	6–4, 7–6^{(7–3)}

== Day 8 (30 May) ==
- Seeds out:
  - Men's Singles: (Croatia) Marin Čilić, (United Kingdom) Andy Murray, (France) Jo-Wilfried Tsonga, (Switzerland) Stanislas Wawrinka
  - Women's Singles: (Russia) Maria Kirilenko, (Italy) Flavia Pennetta, (Russia) Maria Sharapova, (United States) Venus Williams
  - Men's Doubles: (Czech Republic) František Čermák / (Slovakia) Michal Mertiňák
  - Women's Doubles: (Czech Republic) Iveta Benešová / (Czech Republic) Barbora Záhlavová-Strýcová, (Zimbabwe) Cara Black / (Russia) Elena Vesnina, (Belarus) Olga Govortsova / (Russia) Alla Kudryavtseva, (Czech Republic) Andrea Hlaváčková / (Czech Republic) Lucie Hradecká, (Russia) Alisa Kleybanova / (Italy) Francesca Schiavone, (United States) Bethanie Mattek-Sands / (China) Yan Zi, (United States) Lisa Raymond / (Australia) Rennae Stubbs
- Schedule of Play

Matches on main courts
Matches on Court Philippe Chatrier (Center Court)
Event	Winner	Loser	Score
Women's Singles 4th round	(Russia) Elena Dementieva [5]	(South Africa) Chanelle Scheepers [Q]	6–1, 6–3
Women's Singles 3rd round	(Belgium) Justine Henin [22]	(Russia) Maria Sharapova [12]	6–2, 3–6, 6–3
Women's Singles 4th round	(Russia) Nadia Petrova [19]	(United States) Venus Williams [2]	6–4, 6–3
Men's Singles 4th round	(Switzerland) Roger Federer [1]	(Switzerland) Stanislas Wawrinka [20]	6–3, 7–6^{(7–5)}, 6–2
Men's Singles 4th round	(Russia) Mikhail Youzhny [11]	(France) Jo-Wilfried Tsonga [8]	6–2 retired
Matches on Court Suzanne Lenglen (Grandstand)
Event	Winner	Loser	Score
Women's Singles 4th round	(Italy) Francesca Schiavone [17]	(Russia) Maria Kirilenko [30]	6–4, 6–4
Women's Singles 4th round	(Denmark) Caroline Wozniacki [3]	(Italy) Flavia Pennetta [14]	7–6^{(7–5)}, 6–7^{(4–7)}, 6–2
Men's Singles 4th round	(Sweden) Robin Söderling [5]	(Croatia) Marin Čilić [10]	6–4, 6–4, 6–2
Men's Singles 4th round	(Czech Republic) Tomáš Berdych [15]	(United Kingdom) Andy Murray [4]	6–4, 7–5, 6–3

== Day 9 (31 May) ==
- Seeds out:
  - Men's Singles: (Brazil) Thomaz Bellucci, (Spain) Fernando Verdasco
  - Women's Singles: (Slovakia) Daniela Hantuchová, (Belgium) Justine Henin, (Israel) Shahar Pe'er
  - Men's Doubles: (France) Julien Benneteau / (France) Michaël Llodra,
  - Women's Doubles: (Argentina) Gisela Dulko / (Italy) Flavia Pennetta, (Russia) Maria Kirilenko / (Poland) Agnieszka Radwańska, (Russia) Nadia Petrova / (Australia) Samantha Stosur, (Chinese Taipei) Chan Yung-jan / (China) Zheng Jie
  - Mixed Doubles: (Russia) Alisa Kleybanova / (Belarus) Max Mirnyi
- Schedule of Play

Matches on main courts
Matches on Court Philippe Chatrier (Center Court)
Event	Winner	Loser	Score
Men's Singles 4th round	(Serbia) Novak Djokovic [3]	(United States) Robby Ginepri	6–4, 2–6, 6–1, 6–2
Women's Singles 4th round	(United States) Serena Williams [1]	(Israel) Shahar Pe'er [18]	6–2, 6–2
Men's Singles 4th round	(Spain) Rafael Nadal [2]	(Brazil) Thomaz Bellucci [24]	6–2, 7–5, 6–4
Women's Singles 4th round	(Serbia) Jelena Janković [4]	(Slovakia) Daniela Hantuchová [23]	6–4, 6–2
Matches on Court Suzanne Lenglen (Grandstand)
Event	Winner	Loser	Score
Men's Singles 4th round	(Austria) Jürgen Melzer [22]	(Russia) Teymuraz Gabashvili [Q]	7–6^{(8–6)}, 4–6, 6–1, 6–4
Women's Singles 4th round	(Australia) Samantha Stosur [7]	(Belgium) Justine Henin [22]	2–6, 6–1, 6–4
Men's Singles 4th round	(Spain) Nicolás Almagro [19]	(Spain) Fernando Verdasco [7]	6–1, 4–6, 6–1, 6–4
Women's Singles 4th round	(Kazakhstan) Yaroslava Shvedova	(Australia) Jarmila Groth [WC]	6–4, 6–3

== Day 10 (1 June) ==
This day, Roger Federer lost his quarterfinals match against Robin Söderling, making it the first time since the 2004 French Open that Federer did not reach at least the semifinals of a Grand Slam tournament. It also meant that Federer lost his ATP men's single No. 1 ranking in tennis since Rafael Nadal won the 2010 French Open men's singles title. Also, since Nadal became the 2010 French Open men's singles champion, Federer was left only one week short of equalling Pete Sampras's record number of 286 weeks as the ATP No. 1 ranked men's singles player.

- Seeds out:
  - Men's Singles: (Switzerland) Roger Federer, (Russia) Mikhail Youzhny
  - Women's Singles: (Russia) Nadia Petrova, (Denmark) Caroline Wozniacki
  - Men's Doubles: (Poland) Mariusz Fyrstenberg / (Poland) Marcin Matkowski, (Poland) Łukasz Kubot / (Austria) Oliver Marach
  - Mixed Doubles: (Zimbabwe) Cara Black / (India) Leander Paes
- Schedule of Play

Matches on main courts
Matches on Court Philippe Chatrier (Center Court)
Event	Winner	Loser	Score
Women's Singles Quarterfinals	(Italy) Francesca Schiavone [17]	(Denmark) Caroline Wozniacki [3]	6–2, 6–3
Men's Singles Quarterfinals	(Sweden) Robin Söderling [5]	(Switzerland) Roger Federer [1]	3–6, 6–3, 7–5, 6–4
Matches on Court Suzanne Lenglen (Grandstand)
Event	Winner	Loser	Score
Women's Singles Quarterfinals	(Russia) Elena Dementieva [5]	(Russia) Nadia Petrova [19]	2–6, 6–2, 6–0
Men's Singles Quarterfinals	(Czech Republic) Tomáš Berdych [15]	(Russia) Mikhail Youzhny [11]	6–3, 6–1, 6–2

== Day 11 (2 June) ==
This day decided the last two of the four semifinalists in the women's singles. Since none of the four semifinalists (Samantha Stosur, Jelena Janković, Francesca Schiavone, and Elena Dementieva) had won any Grand Slam women's singles titles before, this meant Francesca Schiavone became a first-time women's singles Grand Slam champion in this tournament.

- Seeds out:
  - Men's Singles: (Spain) Nicolás Almagro, (Serbia) Novak Djokovic
  - Women's Singles: (United States) Serena Williams
  - Women's Doubles: (United States) Liezel Huber / (Spain) Anabel Medina Garrigues, (Spain) Nuria Llagostera Vives / (Spain) María José Martínez Sánchez
  - Mixed Doubles: (Spain) Nuria Llagostera Vives / (Austria) Oliver Marach
- Schedule of Play

Matches on main courts
Matches on Court Philippe Chatrier (Center Court)
Event	Winner	Loser	Score
Women's Singles Quarterfinals	(Australia) Samantha Stosur [7]	(United States) Serena Williams [1]	6–2, 6–7^{(2–7)}, 8–6
Men's Singles Quarterfinals	(Spain) Rafael Nadal [2]	(Spain) Nicolás Almagro [19]	7–6^{(7–2)}, 7–6^{(7–3)}, 6–4
Matches on Court Suzanne Lenglen (Grandstand)
Event	Winner	Loser	Score
Women's Singles Quarterfinals	(Serbia) Jelena Janković [4]	(Kazakhstan) Yaroslava Shvedova	7–5, 6–4
Men's Singles Quarterfinals	(Austria) Jürgen Melzer [22]	(Serbia) Novak Djokovic [3]	3–6, 2–6, 6–2, 7–6^{(7–3)}, 6–4

== Day 12 (3 June) ==
- Seeds out:
  - Women's Singles: (Russia) Elena Dementieva, (Serbia) Jelena Janković
  - Men's Doubles: (South Africa) Wesley Moodie / (Belgium) Dick Norman, (Austria) Julian Knowle / (Israel) Andy Ram
- Schedule of Play

Matches on main courts
Matches on Court Philippe Chatrier (Center Court)
Event	Winner	Loser	Score
Women's Singles Semifinals	(Italy) Francesca Schiavone [17]	(Russia) Elena Dementieva [5]	7–6^{(7–3)} retired
Women's Singles Semifinals	(Australia) Samantha Stosur [7]	(Serbia) Jelena Janković [4]	6–1, 6–2
Mixed Doubles Final	(Slovenia) Katarina Srebotnik [6] (Serbia) Nenad Zimonjić [6]	(Kazakhstan) Yaroslava Shvedova (Austria) Julian Knowle	4–6, 7–6^{(7–5)}, [11–9]
Matches on Court Suzanne Lenglen (Grandstand)
Event	Winner	Loser	Score
Women's Legends Doubles Semifinals	(Croatia) Iva Majoli (France) Nathalie Tauziat	(United States) Gigi Fernández (Belarus) Natasha Zvereva	4–6, 6–3, [10–8]
Legends Over 45 Doubles Group A	(Sweden) Joakim Nyström (Sweden) Mats Wilander	(Australia) Pat Cash (Sweden) Mikael Pernfors	7–6^{(7–4)}, 6–3
Men's Doubles Semifinals	(Canada) Daniel Nestor [2] (Serbia) Nenad Zimonjić [2]	(South Africa) Wesley Moodie [4] (Belgium) Dick Norman [4]	6–0, 6–3
Legends Over 45 Doubles Group B	(Iran) Mansour Bahrami (France) Henri Leconte	(Romania) Ilie Năstase (Spain) Emilio Sánchez	7–6^{(7–4)}, 3–6, [12–10]

== Day 13 (4 June) ==
- Seeds out:
  - Men's Singles: (Czech Republic) Tomáš Berdych, (Austria) Jürgen Melzer
  - Women's Doubles: (Czech Republic) Květa Peschke / (Slovenia) Katarina Srebotnik
- Schedule of Play

Matches on main courts
Matches on Court Philippe Chatrier (Center Court)
Event	Winner	Loser	Score
Men's Singles Semifinals	(Sweden) Robin Söderling [5]	(Czech Republic) Tomáš Berdych [15]	6–3, 3–6, 5–7, 6–3, 6–3
Men's Singles Semifinals	(Spain) Rafael Nadal [2]	(Austria) Jürgen Melzer [22]	6–2, 6–3, 7–6^{(8–6)}
Matches on Court Suzanne Lenglen (Grandstand)
Event	Winner	Loser	Score
Legends Under 45 Doubles Group B	(France) Arnaud Boetsch (France) Cédric Pioline	(Austria) Thomas Muster (Australia) Mark Woodforde	6–2, 3–6, [12–10]
Women's Legends Doubles Third Place	(United States) Gigi Fernández (Belarus) Natasha Zvereva	(United States) Mary Joe Fernández (Spain) Conchita Martínez	6–1, 6–2
Legends Under 45 Doubles Group A	(Russia) Yevgeny Kafelnikov (Ukraine) Andriy Medvedev	(Spain) Sergi Bruguera (Netherlands) Richard Krajicek	4–6, 6–2, [12–10]
Women's Doubles Final	(United States) Serena Williams [1] (United States) Venus Williams [1]	(Czech Republic) Květa Peschke [12] (Slovenia) Katarina Srebotnik [12]	6–2, 6–3
Legends Over 45 Doubles Group B	(Romania) Ilie Năstase (Spain) Emilio Sánchez	(France) Guy Forget (France) Thierry Tulasne	6–1, 1–6, [10–7]

== Day 14 (5 June) ==
- Seeds out:
  - Women's Singles: (Australia) Samantha Stosur
  - Men's Doubles: (Czech Republic) Lukáš Dlouhý / (India) Leander Paes
- Schedule of Play

Matches on main courts
Matches on Court Philippe Chatrier (Center Court)
Event	Winner	Loser	Score
Women's Singles Final	(Italy) Francesca Schiavone [17]	(Australia) Samantha Stosur [7]	6–4, 7–6^{(7–2)}
Men's Doubles Final	(Canada) Daniel Nestor [2] (Serbia) Nenad Zimonjić [2]	(Czech Republic) Lukáš Dlouhý [3] (India) Leander Paes [3]	7–5, 6–2
Matches on Court Suzanne Lenglen (Grandstand)
Event	Winner	Loser	Score
Legends Over 45 Doubles Group A	(Ecuador) Andrés Gómez (United States) John McEnroe	(Sweden) Joakim Nyström (Sweden) Mats Wilander	6–2, 6–2
Women's Legends Doubles Final	(United States) Martina Navratilova (Czech Republic) Jana Novotná	(Croatia) Iva Majoli (France) Nathalie Tauziat	6–4, 6–2
Legends Under 45 Doubles Group A	(Russia) Yevgeny Kafelnikov (Ukraine) Andrei Medvedev	(United States) Michael Chang (Spain) Albert Costa	6–0, 3–6, [10–7]
Legends Under 45 Doubles Group B	(Croatia) Goran Ivanišević (Germany) Michael Stich	(France) Arnaud Boetsch (France) Cédric Pioline	6–3, 6–2

== Day 15 (6 June) ==
Rafael Nadal reclaimed the No. 1 men's singles ATP ranking, leaving Roger Federer only one week short of equalling Pete Sampras's record number of 286 weeks as the ATP No. 1 ranked men's singles player. This win is also the first time since the French Open 2004 that Roger Federer was knocked out by a player who hasn't won a grand slam tournament.

- Seeds out:
  - Men's Singles: (Sweden) Robin Söderling
- Schedule of Play

Matches on main courts
Matches on Court Philippe Chatrier (Center Court)
Event	Winner	Runner-up	Score
Men's Singles Final	(Spain) Rafael Nadal [2]	(Sweden) Robin Söderling [5]	6–4, 6–2, 6–4
Matches on Court Suzanne Lenglen (Grandstand)
Event	Winner	Runner-up	Score
Legends Over 45 Doubles Final	(Ecuador) Andrés Gómez (United States) John McEnroe	(Iran) Mansour Bahrami (France) Henri Leconte	6–1, 6–1
Legends Under 45 Doubles Final	(Russia) Yevgeny Kafelnikov (Ukraine) Andrei Medvedev	(Croatia) Goran Ivanišević (Germany) Michael Stich	6–1, 6–1
