= 2010 French Open – Boys' doubles =

Boys' doubles
- 2010 French Open

Final
- Champions: (Peru) Duilio Beretta (Ecuador) Roberto Quiroz
- Runners-up: (Argentina) Facundo Argüello (Argentina) Agustín Velotti
- Score: 6–3, 6–2

Events
Singles	men	women		boys	girls
Doubles	men	women	mixed	boys	girls
WC Singles	men	women	quad
WC Doubles	men	women	quad
Legends	−45	45+	women
← 2009 ·	French Open	· 2011 →

Marin Draganja and Dino Marcan were the defending champions, but they did not compete in the Juniors this year.

Duilio Beretta and Roberto Quiroz won in the final 6–3, 6–2, against Facundo Argüello and Agustín Velotti.

== Seeds ==
1. (Bosnia and Herzegovina) Damir Džumhur / (Hungary) Máté Zsiga (quarterfinals)
2. (Germany) Peter Heller / (Germany) Kevin Krawietz (semifinals)
3. (Russia) Victor Baluda / (Russia) Mikhail Biryukov (semifinals)
4. (Australia) James Duckworth / (Australia) Jason Kubler (quarterfinals)
5. (Brazil) Guilherme Clézar / (Brazil) Tiago Fernandes (second round)
6. (United States) Mitchell Frank / (United States) Junior A. Ore (first round)
7. (Peru) Duilio Beretta / (Ecuador) Roberto Quiroz (champions)
8. (Bolivia) Hugo Dellien / (Austria) Dominic Thiem (first round)

== Draw ==
=== Key ===
- Q = Qualifier
- WC = Wild card
- LL = Lucky loser
- Alt = Alternate
- ITF = ITF entry
- PR = Protected ranking
- SR = Special ranking
- SE = Special exempt
- JE = Junior exempt
- JR = Junior Accelerator Programme entrant
- CO = College Accelerator Programme entrant
- NG = Next Gen Accelerator Program entrant
- w/o = Walkover
- r = Retired
- d = Defaulted

=== Finals ===
Semifinals
(Argentina) Facundo Argüello (Argentina) Agustín Velotti	6	1	[10]
3	(Russia) Victor Baluda (Russia) Mikhail Biryukov	4	6	[7]
7	(Peru) Duilio Beretta (Ecuador) Roberto Quiroz	6	5	[10]
2	(Germany) Peter Heller (Germany) Kevin Krawietz	4	7	[7]

Final
(Argentina) Facundo Argüello (Argentina) Agustín Velotti	3	2
7	(Peru) Duilio Beretta (Ecuador) Roberto Quiroz	6	6

=== Top half ===
First round
1	(Bosnia and Herzegovina) Damir Džumhur (Hungary) Máté Zsiga	6	6
(Argentina) Facundo Mena (Brazil) Karue Sell	2	3
(France) Romain Arneodo (France) Mathias Bourgue	4	6	[14]
(Philippines) Jeson Patrombon (Tunisia) Ahmed Triki	6	1	[12]
(United States) Nick Chappell (United States) Dane Webb	5	4
(Argentina) Facundo Argüello (Argentina) Agustín Velotti	7	6
(United Kingdom) Ashley Hewitt (United States) Dennis Novikov	3	3
5	(Brazil) Guilherme Clézar (Brazil) Tiago Fernandes	6	6
3	(Russia) Victor Baluda (Russia) Mikhail Biryukov	7	4	[10]
(Mexico) Alexis Carlos (Belarus) Yaraslav Shyla	5	6	[5]
(Japan) Taro Daniel (Venezuela) Ricardo Rodríguez	7^{7}	3	[6]
(New Zealand) Sebastian Lavie (Argentina) Renzo Olivo	6^{5}	6	[10]
(United Kingdom) Oliver Golding (Russia) Alexander Rumyantsev	6	4	[10]
(France) Medy Chettar (France) Antoine Escoffier	0	6	[3]
(United States) Andrea Collarini (United States) Denis Kudla	6^{2}	6	[10]
8	(Bolivia) Hugo Dellien (Austria) Dominic Thiem	7^{7}	4	[6]

Second round
1	(Bosnia and Herzegovina) D Džumhur (Hungary) M Zsiga	6	7
(France) R Arneodo (France) M Bourgue	2	5
(Argentina) F Argüello (Argentina) A Velotti	2	6	[12]
5	(Brazil) G Clézar (Brazil) T Fernandes	6	4	[10]
3	(Russia) V Baluda (Russia) M Biryukov	6	6
(New Zealand) S Lavie (Argentina) R Olivo	4	3
(United Kingdom) O Golding (Russia) A Rumyantsev	6	6^{4}	[10]
(United States) A Collarini (United States) D Kudla	1	7^{7}	[2]

Quarterfinals
1	(Bosnia and Herzegovina) D Džumhur (Hungary) M Zsiga	2	4
(Argentina) F Argüello (Argentina) A Velotti	6	6
3	(Russia) V Baluda (Russia) M Biryukov	6	6
(United Kingdom) O Golding (Russia) A Rumyantsev	3	4

Semifinals
(Argentina) F Argüello (Argentina) A Velotti	6	1	[10]
3	(Russia) V Baluda (Russia) M Biryukov	4	6	[7]

=== Bottom half ===
First round
7	(Peru) Duilio Beretta (Ecuador) Roberto Quiroz	6	6
(Serbia) Miki Janković (Croatia) Mate Pavić	2	4
(France) Grégoire Barrère (France) Lucas Pouille	6^{2}	2
(Netherlands) Justin Eleveld (Netherlands) Jannick Lupescu	7^{7}	6
(France) Tristan Lamasine (France) Mick Lescure	2	7	[10]
(Colombia) Juan Sebastián Gómez (Barbados) Darian King	6	5	[12]
(Sweden) Daniel Berta (Sweden) Tobias Blomgren	0	4
4	(Australia) James Duckworth (Australia) Jason Kubler	6	6
6	(United States) Mitchell Frank (United States) Junior A. Ore	3	3
(Spain) Carlos Boluda-Purkiss (Italy) Alessandro Colella	6	6
(Slovakia) Filip Horanský (Slovakia) Jozef Kovalík	4	6	[4]
(Philippines) Francis Casey Alcantara (United States) Raymond Sarmiento	6	0	[10]
(France) Lucas Szewczyk (France) Thomas Szewczyk	2	6	[10]
(Republic of Ireland) Sam Barry (Republic of Ireland) John Morrissey	6	3	[6]
(New Zealand) Ben McLachlan (Japan) Yasutaka Uchiyama	0	7	[9]
2	(Germany) Peter Heller (Germany) Kevin Krawietz	6	5	[11]

Second round
7	(Peru) D Beretta (Ecuador) R Quiroz	6	6
(Netherlands) J Eleveld (Netherlands) J Lupescu	0	2
(Colombia) JS Gómez (Barbados) D King	2	4
4	(Australia) J Duckworth (Australia) J Kubler	6	6
(Spain) C Boluda-Purkiss (Italy) A Colella	7^{7}	6
(Philippines) FC Alcantara (United States) R Sarmiento	6^{4}	3
(France) L Szewczyk (France) T Szewczyk	1	1
2	(Germany) P Heller (Germany) K Krawietz	6	6

Quarterfinals
7	(Peru) D Beretta (Ecuador) R Quiroz	6	4	[12]
4	(Australia) J Duckworth (Australia) J Kubler	0	6	[10]
(Spain) C Boluda-Purkiss (Italy) A Colella	6	3	[8]
2	(Germany) P Heller (Germany) K Krawietz	3	6	[10]

Semifinals
7	(Peru) D Beretta (Ecuador) R Quiroz	6	5	[10]
2	(Germany) P Heller (Germany) K Krawietz	4	7	[7]
