= 2010 French Open – Wheelchair men's singles =

Tennis tournament

Wheelchair men's singles
- 2010 French Open

Final
- Champion: (Japan) Shingo Kunieda
- Runner-up: (Sweden) Stefan Olsson
- Score: 6–4, 6–0

Events
Singles	men	women		boys	girls
Doubles	men	women	mixed	boys	girls
WC Singles	men	women	quad
WC Doubles	men	women	quad
Legends	−45	45+	women
- French Open

Three-time defending champion Shingo Kunieda defeated Stefan Olsson in the final, 6–4, 6–0 to win the men's singles wheelchair tennis title at the 2010 French Open. It was his fourth French Open singles title and tenth major singles title overall.

== Seeds ==
1. (Japan) Shingo Kunieda (champion)
2. (France) Stéphane Houdet (semifinals)

== Draw ==
Key

- Q = Qualifier
- WC = Wild card
- LL = Lucky loser
- Alt = Alternate
- ITF = ITF entry
- PR = Protected ranking
- SR = Special ranking
- SE = Special exempt
- JE = Junior exempt
- JR = Junior Accelerator Programme entrant
- CO = College Accelerator Programme entrant
- NG = Next Gen Accelerator Program entrant
- w/o = Walkover
- r = Retired
- d = Defaulted

=== Finals ===
Quarterfinals
1	(Japan) Shingo Kunieda	6	6
(Netherlands) Maikel Scheffers	3	3
(Netherlands) Ronald Vink	3	7^{8}	6^{4}
(France) Nicolas Peifer	6	6^{6}	7^{7}
(Sweden) Stefan Olsson	6	6
(Austria) Martin Legner	3	0
(Netherlands) Robin Ammerlaan	6	4	4
2	(France) Stéphane Houdet	2	6	6

Semifinals
1	(Japan) Shingo Kunieda	6	6
(France) Nicolas Peifer	4	0
(Sweden) Stefan Olsson	6	6
2	(France) Stéphane Houdet	3	3

Final
1	(Japan) Shingo Kunieda	6	6
(Sweden) Stefan Olsson	4	0
