= 2010 French Open – Girls' singles =

Girls' singles
- 2010 French Open

Final
- Champion: (Ukraine) Elina Svitolina
- Runner-up: (Tunisia) Ons Jabeur
- Score: 6–2, 7–5

Events
Singles	men	women		boys	girls
Doubles	men	women	mixed	boys	girls
WC Singles	men	women	quad
WC Doubles	men	women	quad
Legends	−45	45+	women
← 2009 ·	French Open	· 2011 →

Elina Svitolina won the title, defeating Ons Jabeur in the final, 6–2, 7–5.

Kristina Mladenovic was the defending champion, but chose not to participate. She received a wildcard into the women's singles competition, where she lost to 11th seed Li Na in the first round.

== Seeds ==
1. (Puerto Rico) Monica Puig (quarterfinals)
2. (Czech Republic) Karolína Plíšková (first round)
3. (Russia) Irina Khromacheva (semifinals)
4. (Slovenia) Nastja Kolar (third round)
5. (Hungary) Tímea Babos (second round)
6. (Canada) Gabriela Dabrowski (first round)
7. (Russia) Daria Gavrilova (second round)
8. (Czech Republic) Kristýna Plíšková (first round)
9. (United States) Beatrice Capra (quarterfinals)
10. (United States) Lauren Davis (third round)
11. (Belgium) An-Sophie Mestach (first round)
12. (Serbia) Tamara Čurović (first round)
13. (Ukraine) Lyudmyla Kichenok (third round)
14. (Paraguay) Verónica Cepede Royg (second round)
15. (France) Caroline Garcia (second round)
16. (Russia) Nanuli Pipiya (second round)

== Draw ==
=== Key ===
- Q = Qualifier
- WC = Wild card
- LL = Lucky loser
- Alt = Alternate
- SE = Special exempt
- PR = Protected ranking
- ITF = ITF entry
- JE = Junior exempt
- w/o = Walkover
- r = Retired
- d = Defaulted
- SR = Special ranking

=== Finals ===
Quarterfinals
1	(Puerto Rico) Monica Puig	0	6	3
(Croatia) Silvia Njirić	6	3	6
(Ukraine) Elina Svitolina	6	4	6
9	(United States) Beatrice Capra	2	6	3
Q	(Spain) María Teresa Torró Flor	3	3
3	(Russia) Irina Khromacheva	6	6
(United States) Sloane Stephens	3	4
(Tunisia) Ons Jabeur	6	6

Semifinals
(Croatia) Silvia Njirić	3	2
(Ukraine) Elina Svitolina	6	6
3	(Russia) Irina Khromacheva	3	2
(Tunisia) Ons Jabeur	6	6

Final
(Ukraine) Elina Svitolina	6	7
(Tunisia) Ons Jabeur	2	5

=== Top half ===
==== Section 1 ====
First round
1	(Puerto Rico) Monica Puig	6	6
WC	(France) Clothilde de Bernardi	4	4
(Canada) Eugenie Bouchard	3	1
Q	(United States) Grace Min	6	6
(Venezuela) Adriana Pérez	4	3
Q	(Spain) Garbiñe Muguruza	6	6
(Japan) Risa Ozaki	1	6^{2}
13	(Ukraine) Lyudmyla Kichenok	6	7^{7}
12	(Serbia) Tamara Čurović	6	5	4
(United States) Ester Goldfeld	4	7	6
WC	(France) Amandine Hesse	6	6
(Thailand) Luksika Kumkhum	4	2
(Poland) Paula Kania	6^{4}	3
(Croatia) Silvia Njirić	7^{7}	6
(Tunisia) Nour Abbès	2	6	3
7	(Russia) Daria Gavrilova	6	3	6

Second round
1	(Puerto Rico) M Puig	6	6
Q	(United States) G Min	2	3
Q	(Spain) G Muguruza	3	2
13	(Ukraine) L Kichenok	6	6
(United States) E Goldfeld	3	6^{9}
WC	(France) A Hesse	6	7^{11}
(Croatia) S Njirić	6^{7}	7	6
7	(Russia) D Gavrilova	7^{9}	5	3

Third round
1	(Puerto Rico) M Puig	6	6
13	(Ukraine) L Kichenok	3	4
WC	(France) A Hesse	3	3
(Croatia) S Njirić	6	6

Quarterfinals
1	(Puerto Rico) M Puig	0	6	3
(Croatia) S Njirić	6	3	6

==== Section 2 ====
First round
4	(Slovenia) Nastja Kolar	6	6
Q	(Belarus) Polina Pekhova	4	0
WC	(France) Charlène Seateun	6	6
(Serbia) Jovana Jakšić	4	4
(Ukraine) Elina Svitolina	4	6	6
(Slovakia) Jana Čepelová	6	2	4
Q	(Japan) Akiko Omae	4	3
16	(Russia) Nanuli Pipiya	6	6
9	(United States) Beatrice Capra	6	6
Q	(Spain) Lara Arruabarrena	4	2
(Germany) Anna-Lena Friedsam	6	6
LL	(United States) Caitlyn Williams	1	3
WC	(France) Jade Suvrijn	6^{5}	5
(Netherlands) Richèl Hogenkamp	7^{7}	7
(Montenegro) Danka Kovinić	7^{7}	6
8	(Czech Republic) Kristýna Plíšková	6^{4}	2

Second round
4	(Slovenia) N Kolar	6	7^{7}
(France) C Seateun	4	6^{2}
(Ukraine) E Svitolina	3	7	6
16	(Russia) N Pipiya	6	5	2
9	(United States) B Capra	6	6
(Germany) A-L Friedsam	0	3
(Netherlands) R Hogenkamp	6	3	6
(Montenegro) D Kovinić	2	6	8

Third round
4	(Slovenia) N Kolar	5	6^{3}
(Ukraine) E Svitolina	7	7^{7}
9	(United States) B Capra	6	6
(Montenegro) D Kovinić	2	3

Quarterfinals
(Ukraine) E Svitolina	6	4	6
9	(United States) B Capra	2	6	3

=== Bottom half ===
==== Section 3 ====
First round
5	(Hungary) Tímea Babos	6	6
(Belarus) Ilona Kremen	4	2
Q	(Spain) María Teresa Torró Flor	6	6
WC	(France) Leolia Jeanjean	3	3
(Japan) Emi Mutaguchi	2	0
(Serbia) Doroteja Erić	6	6
(Madagascar) Zarah Razafimahatratra	2	1
10	(United States) Lauren Davis	6	6
14	(Paraguay) Verónica Cepede Royg	6	6
Q	(Netherlands) Sabine van der Sar	1	2
(Poland) Magda Linette	6	6
(China) Zheng Saisai	4	2
(Venezuela) Andrea Gámiz	3	2
WC	(France) Laëtitia Sarrazin	6	6
(Argentina) Agustína Sol Eskenazi	6	3	4
3	(Russia) Irina Khromacheva	4	6	6

Second round
5	(Hungary) T Babos	3	6	4
Q	(Spain) MT Torró Flor	6	4	6
(Serbia) D Erić	1	1
10	(United States) L Davis	6	6
14	(Paraguay) V Cepede Royg	1	6	1
(Poland) M Linette	6	2	6
WC	(France) L Sarrazin	2	3
3	(Russia) I Khromacheva	6	6

Third round
Q	(Spain) MT Torró Flor	2	7	6
10	(United States) L Davis	6	5	3
(Poland) M Linette	2	2
3	(Russia) I Khromacheva	6	6

Quarterfinals
Q	(Spain) MT Torró Flor	3	3
3	(Russia) I Khromacheva	6	6

==== Section 4 ====
First round
6	(Canada) Gabriela Dabrowski	6	1	0
(Slovakia) Chantal Škamlová	4	6	6
Q	(Serbia) Natalija Kostić	6	4	6
WC	(France) Estelle Cascino	4	6	3
(Russia) Yana Buchina	2	2
(United States) Sloane Stephens	6	6
(Romania) Cristina Dinu	6	3	6
11	(Belgium) An-Sophie Mestach	4	6	4
15	(France) Caroline Garcia	6	6
(Denmark) Mai Grage	3	4
(Tunisia) Ons Jabeur	7^{10}	6
(Ukraine) Sofiya Kovalets	6^{8}	2
(Indonesia) Grace Sari Ysidora	6^{4}	1
(Norway) Ulrikke Eikeri	7^{7}	6
WC	(France) Morgane Pons	6	6
2	(Czech Republic) Karolína Plíšková	3	1

Second round
(Slovakia) C Škamlová	6	6
Q	(Serbia) N Kostić	2	3
(United States) S Stephens	6	6
(Romania) C Dinu	2	1
15	(France) C Garcia	3	3
(Tunisia) O Jabeur	6	6
(Norway) U Eikeri	7^{7}	4	3
WC	(France) M Pons	6^{5}	6	6

Third round
(Slovakia) C Škamlová	3	3
(United States) S Stephens	6	6
(Tunisia) O Jabeur	6	6
WC	(France) M Pons	3	1

Quarterfinals
(United States) S Stephens	3	4
(Tunisia) O Jabeur	6	6
