= 2010 French Open – Girls' doubles =

Girls' doubles
- 2010 French Open

Final
- Champions: (Hungary) Tímea Babos (United States) Sloane Stephens
- Runners-up: (Spain) Lara Arruabarrena Vecino (Spain) María Teresa Torró Flor
- Score: 6–2, 6–3

Events
Singles	men	women		boys	girls
Doubles	men	women	mixed	boys	girls
WC Singles	men	women	quad
WC Doubles	men	women	quad
Legends	−45	45+	women
← 2009 ·	French Open	· 2011 →

Elena Bogdan and Noppawan Lertcheewakarn were the defending champions, but they did not compete in the juniors this year.

Tímea Babos and Sloane Stephens won the tournament, defeating Lara Arruabarrena Vecino and María Teresa Torró Flor in the final, 6–2, 6–3.

== Seeds ==
1. (Czech Republic) Karolína Plíšková / (Czech Republic) Kristýna Plíšková (first round)
2. (Canada) Gabriela Dabrowski / (Russia) Daria Gavrilova (second round)
3. (Slovenia) Nastja Kolar / (Belgium) An-Sophie Mestach (first round)
4. (United States) Beatrice Capra / (Paraguay) Verónica Cepede Royg (quarterfinals)
5. (Hungary) Tímea Babos / (United States) Sloane Stephens (champions)
6. (Russia) Irina Khromacheva / (Croatia) Silvia Njirić (second round)
7. (Serbia) Tamara Čurović / (Ukraine) Sophia Kovalets (first round)
8. (Ukraine) Lyudmyla Kichenok / (Ukraine) Elina Svitolina (semifinals)

== Draw ==
=== Key ===
- Q = Qualifier
- WC = Wild card
- LL = Lucky loser
- Alt = Alternate
- SE = Special exempt
- PR = Protected ranking
- ITF = ITF entry
- JE = Junior exempt
- w/o = Walkover
- r = Retired
- d = Defaulted
- SR = Special ranking

=== Finals ===
Semifinals
(Denmark) Mai Grage (China) Zheng Saisai	0	1
5	(Hungary) Tímea Babos (United States) Sloane Stephens	6	6
8	(Ukraine) Lyudmyla Kichenok (Ukraine) Elina Svitolina	2	4
(Spain) Lara Arruabarrena Vecino (Spain) María Teresa Torró Flor	6	6

Final
5	(Hungary) Tímea Babos (United States) Sloane Stephens	6	6
(Spain) Lara Arruabarrena Vecino (Spain) María Teresa Torró Flor	2	3

=== Top half ===
First round
1	(Czech Republic) Ka Plíšková (Czech Republic) Kr Plíšková	6^{8}	6	[5]
(Tunisia) N Abbès (Tunisia) O Jabeur	7^{10}	3	[10]
(United States) E Goldfeld (Indonesia) GS Ysidora	1	7^{9}
(Canada) E Bouchard (Madagascar) Z Razafimahatratra	6	6^{7}	[10]
(France) E Cascino (France) J Suvrijn	1	3
(Denmark) M Grage (China) S Zheng	6	6
(Netherlands) R Hogenkamp (Netherlands) S van der Sar	1	6	[5]
6	(Russia) I Khromacheva (Croatia) S Njirić	6	2	[10]
3	(Slovenia) N Kolar (Belgium) A-S Mestach	6	6^{8}	[10]
(France) C de Bernardi (France) L Jeanjean	2	7^{10}	[12]
(Venezuela) A Gámiz (Venezuela) A Pérez	3	1
(Belarus) I Kremen (Thailand) L Kumkhum	6	6
(Russia) P Leykina (Russia) N Pipiya	3	6	[7]
(Argentina) A Sol Eskenazi (Montenegro) D Kovinić	6	3	[10]
(France) J Ginier (France) M Pons	2	2
5	(Hungary) T Babos (United States) S Stephens	6	6

Second round
(Tunisia) N Abbès (Tunisia) O Jabeur	7^{7}	4	[10]
(Canada) E Bouchard (Madagascar) Z Razafimahatratra	6^{3}	6	[8]
(Denmark) M Grage (China) S Zheng	6	6
6	(Russia) I Khromacheva (Croatia) S Njirić	4	4
(France) C de Bernardi (France) L Jeanjean	6	6
(Belarus) I Kremen (Thailand) L Kumkhum	4	4
(Argentina) A Sol Eskenazi (Montenegro) D Kovinić	3	0
5	(Hungary) T Babos (United States) S Stephens	6	6

Quarterfinals
(Tunisia) N Abbès (Tunisia) O Jabeur	3	2
(Denmark) M Grage (China) S Zheng	6	6
(France) C de Bernardi (France) L Jeanjean	3	0
5	(Hungary) T Babos (United States) S Stephens	6	6

Semifinals
(Denmark) M Grage (China) S Zheng	0	1
5	(Hungary) T Babos (United States) S Stephens	6	6

=== Bottom half ===
First round
8	(Ukraine) L Kichenok (Ukraine) E Svitolina	4	7	[10]
(Russia) Y Buchina (Germany) A-L Friedsam	6	5	[4]
(Serbia) J Jakšić (Belarus) P Pekhova	2	3
(United States) G Min (Japan) A Omae	6	6
(France) A Hesse (France) L Sarrazin	3	6^{4}
(Romania) C Dinu (Serbia) D Erić	6	7^{7}
(Slovakia) J Čepelová (Slovakia) C Škamlová	3	6^{1}
4	(United States) B Capra (Paraguay) V Cepede Royg	6	7^{7}
7	(Serbia) T Čurović (Ukraine) S Kovalets	4	4
(Spain) L Arruabarrena Vecino (Spain) MT Torró Flor	6	6
(France) C Garcia (France) C Seateun	7	7
(Japan) E Mutaguchi (Japan) R Ozaki	5	5
(Poland) P Kania (Poland) M Linette	6	6
(United States) L Davis (United States) C Williams	0	1
(Serbia) N Kostić (Spain) G Muguruza	3	4
2	(Canada) G Dabrowski (Russia) D Gavrilova	6	6

Second round
8	(Ukraine) L Kichenok (Ukraine) E Svitolina	6	7^{7}
(United States) G Min (Japan) A Omae	2	6^{4}
(Romania) C Dinu (Serbia) D Erić	4	4
4	(United States) B Capra (Paraguay) V Cepede Royg	6	6
(Spain) L Arruabarrena Vecino (Spain) MT Torró Flor	6	6
(France) C Garcia (France) C Seateun	2	2
(Poland) P Kania (Poland) M Linette	7^{7}	6
2	(Canada) G Dabrowski (Russia) D Gavrilova	6^{6}	2

Quarterfinals
8	(Ukraine) L Kichenok (Ukraine) E Svitolina	6	6
4	(United States) B Capra (Paraguay) V Cepede Royg	4	2
(Spain) L Arruabarrena Vecino (Spain) MT Torró Flor	7^{7}	6^{5}	[10]
(Poland) P Kania (Poland) M Linette	6^{4}	7^{7}	[8]

Semifinals
8	(Ukraine) L Kichenok (Ukraine) E Svitolina	2	4
(Spain) L Arruabarrena Vecino (Spain) MT Torró Flor	6	6
