= 2010 French Open – Wheelchair women's doubles =

Wheelchair women's doubles
- 2010 French Open

Final
- Champions: (Australia) Daniela Di Toro (Netherlands) Aniek van Koot
- Runners-up: (Netherlands) Esther Vergeer (Netherlands) Sharon Walraven
- Score: 3–6, 6–3, [10–4]

Events
Singles	men	women		boys	girls
Doubles	men	women	mixed	boys	girls
WC Singles	men	women	quad
WC Doubles	men	women	quad
Legends	−45	45+	women
- French Open

Daniela Di Toro and Aniek van Koot defeated the three-time defending champion Esther Vergeer and her partner Sharon Walraven in the final, 3–6, 6–3, [10–4] to win the women's doubles wheelchair tennis title at the 2010 French Open. With the win, they ended Vergeer's 19-major winning streak, dating back at the 2002 French Open.

Korie Homan and Esther Vergeer were the reigning champions, but Homan did not compete this year.

== Seeds ==
1. (Australia) Daniela Di Toro / (Netherlands) Aniek van Koot (champions)
2. (Netherlands) Esther Vergeer / (Netherlands) Sharon Walraven (final)

== Draw ==
Key

- Q = Qualifier
- WC = Wild card
- LL = Lucky loser
- Alt = Alternate
- ITF = ITF entry
- PR = Protected ranking
- SR = Special ranking
- SE = Special exempt
- JE = Junior exempt
- JR = Junior Accelerator Programme entrant
- CO = College Accelerator Programme entrant
- NG = Next Gen Accelerator Program entrant
- w/o = Walkover
- r = Retired
- d = Defaulted

=== Finals ===
Semifinals
1	(Australia) Daniela Di Toro (Netherlands) Aniek van Koot	6	6
(Germany) Katharina Krüger (South Korea) Ju Yeon Park	2	2
(France) Florence Gravellier (Netherlands) Jiske Griffioen	5	4
2	(Netherlands) Esther Vergeer (Netherlands) Sharon Walraven	7	6

Final
1	(Australia) Daniela Di Toro (Netherlands) Aniek van Koot	3	6	[10]
2	(Netherlands) Esther Vergeer (Netherlands) Sharon Walraven	6	3	[4]
