= 2010 French Open – Wheelchair men's doubles =

Wheelchair men's doubles
- 2010 French Open

Final
- Champion: (France) Stéphane Houdet (Japan) Shingo Kunieda
- Runner-up: (Netherlands) Robin Ammerlaan (Sweden) Stefan Olsson
- Score: 6–0, 5–7, [10–8]

Events
Singles	men	women		boys	girls
Doubles	men	women	mixed	boys	girls
WC Singles	men	women	quad
WC Doubles	men	women	quad
Legends	−45	45+	women
- French Open

Defending champion Stéphane Houdet and his partner Shingo Kunieda defeated Robin Ammerlaan and Stefan Olsson in the final, 6–0, 5–7, [10–8] to win the men's doubles wheelchair tennis title at the 2010 French Open.

Houdet and Michael Jérémiasz were the defending champions, but Jérémiasz did not compete this year.

== Seeds ==
1. (France) Stéphane Houdet / (Japan) Shingo Kunieda (champions)
2. (Netherlands) Maikel Scheffers / (Netherlands) Ronald Vink (semifinals)

== Draw ==
Key

- Q = Qualifier
- WC = Wild card
- LL = Lucky loser
- Alt = Alternate
- ITF = ITF entry
- PR = Protected ranking
- SR = Special ranking
- SE = Special exempt
- JE = Junior exempt
- JR = Junior Accelerator Programme entrant
- CO = College Accelerator Programme entrant
- NG = Next Gen Accelerator Program entrant
- w/o = Walkover
- r = Retired
- d = Defaulted

=== Finals ===
Semifinals
1	(France) Stéphane Houdet (Japan) Shingo Kunieda	6	6
(Austria) Martin Legner (France) Nicolas Peifer	2	0
(Netherlands) Robin Ammerlaan (Sweden) Stefan Olsson	6	5	[10]
2	(Netherlands) Maikel Scheffers (Netherlands) Ronald Vink	1	7	[7]

Final
1	(France) Stéphane Houdet (Japan) Shingo Kunieda	6	5	[10]
(Netherlands) Robin Ammerlaan (Sweden) Stefan Olsson	0	7	[8]
