= 2010 French Open – Boys' singles =

Boys' singles
- 2010 French Open

Final
- Champion: (Argentina) Agustín Velotti
- Runner-up: (United States) Andrea Collarini
- Score: 6–4, 7–5

Events
Singles	men	women		boys	girls
Doubles	men	women	mixed	boys	girls
WC Singles	men	women	quad
WC Doubles	men	women	quad
Legends	−45	45+	women
← 2009 ·	French Open	· 2011 →

Daniel Berta was the defending champion, but he lost in the first round against Junior A. Ore.
Agustín Velotti won the title after defeating Andrea Collarini in the final, 6–4, 7–5.

== Seeds ==
1. (Sweden) Daniel Berta (first round)
2. (Australia) Jason Kubler (second round)
3. (France) Gianni Mina (quarterfinals)
4. (Czech Republic) Jiří Veselý (first round, retired)
5. (Brazil) Tiago Fernandes (quarterfinals)
6. (United States) Denis Kudla (third round)
7. (Germany) Kevin Krawietz (first round)
8. (Austria) Dominic Thiem (first round)
9. (Peru) Duilio Beretta (semifinals)
10. (Hungary) Máté Zsiga (third round)
11. (Argentina) Renzo Olivo (quarterfinals, retired)
12. (Bosnia and Herzegovina) Damir Džumhur (second round)
13. (United States) Mitchell Frank (second round)
14. (Russia) Mikhail Biryukov (third round)
15. (Russia) Victor Baluda (third round)
16. (Japan) Yasutaka Uchiyama (third round)

== Draw ==
=== Key ===
- Q = Qualifier
- WC = Wild card
- LL = Lucky loser
- Alt = Alternate
- ITF = ITF entry
- PR = Protected ranking
- SR = Special ranking
- SE = Special exempt
- JE = Junior exempt
- JR = Junior Accelerator Programme entrant
- CO = College Accelerator Programme entrant
- NG = Next Gen Accelerator Program entrant
- w/o = Walkover
- r = Retired
- d = Defaulted

=== Final eight ===
Quarterfinals
(Argentina) Agustín Velotti	7^{11}	6
5	(Brazil) Tiago Fernandes	6^{9}	1
3	(France) Gianni Mina	3	4
(Australia) James Duckworth	6	6
11	(Argentina) Renzo Olivo	6	3	2^{r}
(United States) Andrea Collarini	1	6	5
9	(Peru) Duilio Beretta	6	6^{2}	8
(Croatia) Mate Pavić	2	7^{7}	6

Semifinals
(Argentina) Agustín Velotti	6	7
(Australia) James Duckworth	3	5
(United States) Andrea Collarini	6	6
9	(Peru) Duilio Beretta	3	3

Final
(Argentina) Agustín Velotti	6	7
(United States) Andrea Collarini	4	5

=== Top half ===
==== Section 1 ====
First round
1	(Sweden) Daniel Berta	6	1	4
(United States) Junior Alexander Ore	2	6	6
(Slovakia) Jozef Kovalík	2	2
(Argentina) Agustín Velotti	6	6
(Japan) Taro Daniel	1	6	2
WC	(France) Lucas Pouille	6	4	6
(Tunisia) Ahmed Triki	4	3
15	(Russia) Victor Baluda	6	6
10	(Hungary) Máté Zsiga	7^{7}	4	6
(Ecuador) Roberto Quiroz	6^{5}	6	4
(United States) Nick Chappell	6	5	6
WC	(France) Antoine Escoffier	2	7	3
WC	(France) Mick Lescure	6^{5}	4
(United Kingdom) Oliver Golding	7^{7}	6
Q	(New Zealand) Sebastian Lavie	4	1
5	(Brazil) Tiago Fernandes	6	6

Second round
(United States) JA Ore	2	2
(Argentina) A Velotti	6	6
WC	(France) L Pouille	6	1	4
15	(Russia) V Baluda	4	6	6
10	(Hungary) M Zsiga	6	6
(United States) N Chappell	2	1
(United Kingdom) O Golding	2	6^{0}
5	(Brazil) T Fernandes	6	7^{7}

Third round
(Argentina) A Velotti	6	7^{7}
15	(Russia) V Baluda	2	6^{3}
10	(Hungary) M Zsiga	1	3
5	(Brazil) T Fernandes	6	6

Quarterfinals
(Argentina) A Velotti	7^{11}	6
5	(Brazil) T Fernandes	6^{9}	1

==== Section 2 ====
First round
3	(France) Gianni Mina	6	6
(Venezuela) Ricardo Rodríguez	3	4
(Italy) Alessandro Colella	6	6
(Bolivia) Hugo Dellien	4	3
(Spain) Carlos Boluda-Purkiss	6	5	5
(Netherlands) Jannick Lupescu	2	7	7
SE	(Republic of Ireland) Sam Barry	4	6	2
13	(United States) Mitchell Frank	6	4	6
12	(Bosnia and Herzegovina) Damir Džumhur	5	6	6
(Russia) Alexander Rumyantsev	7	2	2
WC	(France) Medy Chettar	6^{5}	7^{10}	2
(Australia) James Duckworth	7^{7}	6^{8}	6
WC	(France) Lucas Szewczyk	5	5
LL	(United States) Dane Webb	7	7
(Argentina) Facundo Argüello	6	3	6
7	(Germany) Kevin Krawietz	3	6	3

Second round
3	(France) G Mina	6	7
(Italy) A Colella	2	5
(Netherlands) J Lupescu	6	6
13	(United States) M Frank	1	2
12	(Bosnia and Herzegovina) D Džumhur	6^{6}	6	2
(Australia) J Duckworth	7^{8}	3	6
LL	(United States) D Webb	3	2
(Argentina) F Argüello	6	6

Third round
3	(France) G Mina	6	6
(Netherlands) J Lupescu	1	3
(Australia) J Duckworth	7	6
(Argentina) F Argüello	5	1

Quarterfinals
3	(France) G Mina	3	4
(Australia) J Duckworth	6	6

=== Bottom half ===
==== Section 3 ====
First round
8	(Austria) Dominic Thiem	3	7	4
Q	(United Kingdom) Ashley Hewitt	6	5	6
Q	(France) Tristan Lamasine	6	4	5
(Germany) Peter Heller	2	6	7
(Brazil) Guilherme Clézar	7	6
(United States) Raymond Sarmiento	5	3
(France) Romain Arneodo	6	4	3
11	(Argentina) Renzo Olivo	1	6	6
14/Q	(Russia) Mikhail Biryukov	7^{7}	6
(Colombia) Juan Sebastián Gómez	6^{4}	1
WC	(France) Thomas Szewczyk	6	6^{3}	7
Q	(Italy) Federico Gaio	3	7^{7}	5
WC	(Australia) Andrew Whittington	7	4	1
(Sweden) Tobias Blomgren	5	6	6
(United States) Andrea Collarini	5
4	(Czech Republic) Jiří Veselý	4^{r}

Second round
Q	(United Kingdom) A Hewitt	7^{7}	6
(Germany) P Heller	6^{4}	4
(Brazil) G Clézar	3	2
11	(Argentina) R Olivo	6	6
14/Q	(Russia) M Biryukov	6	6
WC	(France) T Szewczyk	3	2
(Sweden) T Blomgren	0	1
(United States) A Collarini	6	6

Third round
Q	(United Kingdom) A Hewitt	4	6^{3}
11	(Argentina) R Olivo	6	7^{7}
14/Q	(Russia) M Biryukov	4	3
(United States) A Collarini	6	6

Quarterfinals
11	(Argentina) R Olivo	6	3	2
(United States) A Collarini	1	6	5^{r}

==== Section 4 ====
First round
6	(United States) Denis Kudla	6	7^{7}
(Netherlands) Justin Eleveld	1	6^{3}
(Finland) Micke Kontinen	7	1	6
(Republic of Ireland) John Morrissey	5	6	4
(Philippines) Jeson Patrombon	6	6
Q	(Serbia) Miki Janković	3	1
WC	(France) Grégoire Barrère	7^{7}	3	6
9	(Peru) Duilio Beretta	6^{5}	6	8
16	(Japan) Yasutaka Uchiyama	6	6
Q	(Brazil) Karue Sell	4	2
(Slovakia) Filip Horanský	6	6
(Barbados) Darian King	4	3
(Croatia) Mate Pavić	6	7^{10}
(France) Mathias Bourgue	4	6^{8}
Q	(Argentina) Facundo Mena	6	4	2
2	(Australia) Jason Kubler	2	6	6

Second round
6	(United States) D Kudla	7^{8}	6
(Finland) M Kontinen	6^{6}	3
(Philippines) J Patrombon	2	7^{7}	2
9	(Peru) D Beretta	6	6^{4}	6
16	(Japan) Y Uchiyama	6	7^{8}
(Slovakia) F Horanský	3	6^{6}
(Croatia) M Pavić	6	6
2	(Australia) J Kubler	4	1

Third round
6	(United States) D Kudla	6	4	3
9	(Peru) D Beretta	1	6	6
16	(Japan) Y Uchiyama	5	6^{5}
(Croatia) M Pavić	7	7^{7}

Quarterfinals
9	(Peru) D Beretta	6	6^{2}	8
(Croatia) M Pavić	2	7^{7}	6
