= 2010 French Open – Wheelchair women's singles =

Wheelchair women's singles
- 2010 French Open

Final
- Champion: (Netherlands) Esther Vergeer
- Runner-up: (Netherlands) Sharon Walraven
- Score: 6–0, 6–0

Events
Singles	men	women		boys	girls
Doubles	men	women	mixed	boys	girls
WC Singles	men	women	quad
WC Doubles	men	women	quad
Legends	−45	45+	women
- French Open

Three-time defending champion Esther Vergeer defeated Sharon Walraven in the final, 6–0, 6–0 to win the women's singles wheelchair tennis title at the 2010 French Open. Vergeer lost no sets and only four games en route to the title.

== Seeds ==
1. (Netherlands) Esther Vergeer (champion)
2. (France) Florence Gravellier (semifinals)

== Draw ==
Key

- Q = Qualifier
- WC = Wild card
- LL = Lucky loser
- Alt = Alternate
- ITF = ITF entry
- PR = Protected ranking
- SR = Special ranking
- SE = Special exempt
- JE = Junior exempt
- JR = Junior Accelerator Programme entrant
- CO = College Accelerator Programme entrant
- NG = Next Gen Accelerator Program entrant
- w/o = Walkover
- r = Retired
- d = Defaulted

=== Finals ===
Quarterfinals
1	(Netherlands) Esther Vergeer	6	6
(Netherlands) Jiske Griffioen	2	1
(Netherlands) Aniek van Koot	6	0	6^{3}
(Australia) Daniela Di Toro	4	6	7^{7}
(South Korea) Ju Yeon Park	2	4
(Netherlands) Sharon Walraven	6	6
(Germany) Katharina Krüger	0	1
2	(France) Florence Gravellier	6	6

Semifinals
1	(Netherlands) Esther Vergeer	6	6
(Australia) Daniela Di Toro	0	1
(Netherlands) Sharon Walraven	6	7
2	(France) Florence Gravellier	4	5

Final
1	(Netherlands) Esther Vergeer	6	6
(Netherlands) Sharon Walraven	0	0
