= 2010 French Open – Women's legends doubles =

Women's legends doubles
- 2010 French Open

Final
- Champions: (United States) Martina Navratilova (Czech Republic) Jana Novotná
- Runners-up: (Croatia) Iva Majoli (France) Nathalie Tauziat
- Score: 6–4, 6–2

Events
Singles	men	women		boys	girls
Doubles	men	women	mixed	boys	girls
WC Singles	men	women	quad
WC Doubles	men	women	quad
Legends	−45	45+	women
← 2009 ·	French Open	· 2011 →

Martina Navratilova and Jana Novotná won in the final 6–4, 6–2 against Iva Majoli and Nathalie Tauziat.

== Draw ==
=== Key ===
- Q = Qualifier
- WC = Wild card
- LL = Lucky loser
- Alt = Alternate
- ITF = ITF entry
- PR = Protected ranking
- SR = Special ranking
- SE = Special exempt
- JE = Junior exempt
- JR = Junior Accelerator Programme entrant
- CO = College Accelerator Programme entrant
- NG = Next Gen Accelerator Program entrant
- w/o = Walkover
- r = Retired
- d = Defaulted

=== Finals ===
Semifinals
(United States) Martina Navratilova (Czech Republic) Jana Novotná	6	6
(United States) Mary Joe Fernandez (Spain) Conchita Martínez	1	2
(United States) Gigi Fernández (Belarus) Natasha Zvereva	6	3	[8]
(Croatia) Iva Majoli (France) Nathalie Tauziat	4	6	[10]

Final
(United States) Martina Navratilova (Czech Republic) Jana Novotná	6	6
(Croatia) Iva Majoli (France) Nathalie Tauziat	4	2
Third place
(United States) Mary Joe Fernandez (Spain) Conchita Martínez	1	2
(United States) Gigi Fernández (Belarus) Natasha Zvereva	6	6
