= 2010 French Open – Legends under 45 doubles =

Legends under 45 doubles
- 2010 French Open

Final
- Champions: (Russia) Yevgeny Kafelnikov (Ukraine) Andriy Medvedev
- Runners-up: (Croatia) Goran Ivanišević (Germany) Michael Stich
- Score: 6–1, 6–1

Events
Singles	men	women		boys	girls
Doubles	men	women	mixed	boys	girls
WC Singles	men	women	quad
WC Doubles	men	women	quad
Legends	−45	45+	women
← 2009 ·	French Open	· 2011 →

Paul Haarhuis and Cédric Pioline were the defending champion, but Haarhuis did not play this year.
Pioline partnered up with Arnaud Boetsch, but they were eliminated by Goran Ivanišević and Michael Stich in the round-robin stage.
Yevgeny Kafelnikov and Andriy Medvedev won in the final 6–1, 6–1 against Ivanisevic and Stich.

== Draw ==
=== Key ===
- Q = Qualifier
- WC = Wild card
- LL = Lucky loser
- Alt = Alternate
- ITF = ITF entry
- PR = Protected ranking
- SR = Special ranking
- SE = Special exempt
- JE = Junior exempt
- JR = Junior Accelerator Programme entrant
- CO = College Accelerator Programme entrant
- NG = Next Gen Accelerator Program entrant
- w/o = Walkover
- r = Retired
- d = Defaulted

=== Final ===
Final
1	(Russia) Yevgeny Kafelnikov (Ukraine) Andriy Medvedev	6	6
2	(Croatia) Goran Ivanišević (Germany) Michael Stich	1	1

=== Group A ===
	(Russia) Kafelnikov (Ukraine) Medvedev	(United States) Chang (Spain) Costa	(Spain) Bruguera (Netherlands) Krajicek	RR; W–L	Set; W–L	Game; W–L	Standings
(Russia) Yevgeny Kafelnikov (Ukraine) Andriy Medvedev		6–0, 3–6, [10–7]	4–6, 6–2, [12–10]	2–0	4–2	21–14	1
(United States) Michael Chang (Spain) Albert Costa	0–6, 6–3, [7–10]		7–5, 3–6, [10–7]	1–1	3–3	17–21	2
(Spain) Sergi Bruguera (Netherlands) Richard Krajicek	6–4, 2–6, [10–12]	5–7, 6–3, [7–10]		0–2	2–4	19–22	3

Standings are determined by: 1. number of wins; 2. number of matches; 3. in three-players-ties, percentage of sets won, or of games won; 4. steering-committee decision.

=== Group B ===
	(Croatia) Ivanišević (Germany) Stich	(France) Boetsch (France) Pioline	(Austria) Muster (Australia) Woodforde	RR; W–L	Set; W–L	Game; W–L	Standings
(Croatia) Goran Ivanišević (Germany) Michael Stich		6–4, 3–6, [10–8]	6–4, 6–4	2–0	4–1	22–18	1
(France) Arnaud Boetsch (France) Cédric Pioline	4–6, 6–3, [8–10]		6–2, 3–6, [12–10]	1–1	3–3	20–18	2
(Austria) Thomas Muster (Australia) Mark Woodforde	4–6, 4–6	2–6, 6–3, [10–12]		0–2	1–4	16–22	3

Standings are determined by: 1. number of wins; 2. number of matches; 3. in three-players-ties, percentage of sets won, or of games won; 4. steering-committee decision.
