= 2010 French Open – Women's doubles =

Women's doubles
- 2010 French Open

Final
- Champions: (United States) Serena Williams (United States) Venus Williams
- Runners-up: (Czech Republic) Květa Peschke (Slovenia) Katarina Srebotnik
- Score: 6–2, 6–3

Details
- Draw: 64 (7 WC )
- Seeds: 16

Events
| Singles | men | women | | boys | girls |
| Doubles | men | women | mixed | boys | girls |
| WC Singles | men | women | quad |
| WC Doubles | men | women | quad |
| Legends | −45 | 45+ | women |
| ← 2009 · | French Open | · 2011 → |

Serena and Venus Williams defeated Květa Peschke and Katarina Srebotnik in the final, 6–2, 6–3 to win the women's doubles tennis title at the 2010 French Open. It was their second French Open doubles title together and 12th major title together overall. With the win, they became the sixth and seventh women to complete a non-calendar-year Grand Slam in doubles. Additionally, the Williams sisters jointly gained the world No. 1 doubles ranking for the first time, becoming the first sisters to be co-ranked world No. 1 in doubles. They also completed their second career Golden Slam in women's doubles.

Anabel Medina Garrigues and Virginia Ruano Pascual were the defending champions, but chose not to compete together. Ruano Pascual partnered with Meghann Shaughnessy, but lost in the first round to Cara Black and Elena Vesnina. Medina Garrigues partnered with Liezel Huber, but lost in the semifinals to the Williams sisters.

== Seeds ==
1. (United States) Serena Williams / (United States) Venus Williams (champions)
2. (Spain) Nuria Llagostera Vives / (Spain) María José Martínez Sánchez (semifinals)
3. (United States) Liezel Huber / (Spain) Anabel Medina Garrigues (semifinals)
4. (Russia) Nadia Petrova / (Australia) Samantha Stosur (third round, retired)
5. (Argentina) Gisela Dulko / (Italy) Flavia Pennetta (quarterfinals)
6. (Zimbabwe) Cara Black / (Russia) Elena Vesnina (third round)
7. (United States) Lisa Raymond / (Australia) Rennae Stubbs (third round)
8. (Russia) Alisa Kleybanova / (Italy) Francesca Schiavone (second round)
9. (United States) Bethanie Mattek-Sands / (China) Yan Zi (third round)
10. (Chinese Taipei) Chan Yung-jan / (China) Zheng Jie (third round)
11. (Russia) Maria Kirilenko / (Poland) Agnieszka Radwańska (quarterfinals)
12. (Czech Republic) Květa Peschke / (Slovenia) Katarina Srebotnik (final)
13. (Czech Republic) Iveta Benešová / (Czech Republic) Barbora Záhlavová-Strýcová (third round)
14. (Russia) Vera Dushevina / (Russia) Ekaterina Makarova (second round)
15. (Belarus) Olga Govortsova / (Russia) Alla Kudryavtseva (third round)
16. (Czech Republic) Andrea Hlaváčková / (Czech Republic) Lucie Hradecká (third round)

== Draw ==
=== Finals ===
Quarterfinals
1 | (United States) Serena Williams (United States) Venus Williams | 6 | 6
11 | (Russia) Maria Kirilenko (Poland) Agnieszka Radwańska | 2 | 3
3 | (United States) Liezel Huber (Spain) Anabel Medina Garrigues | 1 | 6 | 7^{7}
5 | (Argentina) Gisela Dulko (Italy) Flavia Pennetta | 6 | 0 | 6^{4}
12 | (Czech Republic) Květa Peschke (Slovenia) Katarina Srebotnik | 4 | 6 | 6
(Ukraine) Alona Bondarenko (Ukraine) Kateryna Bondarenko | 6 | 2 | 3
(Romania) Monica Niculescu (Israel) Shahar Pe'er | 2 | 4
2 | (Spain) Nuria Llagostera Vives (Spain) María José Martínez Sánchez | 6 | 6

Semifinals
1 | (United States) Serena Williams (United States) Venus Williams | 2 | 6 | 6
3 | (United States) Liezel Huber (Spain) Anabel Medina Garrigues | 6 | 2 | 4
12 | (Czech Republic) Květa Peschke (Slovenia) Katarina Srebotnik | 3 | 6 | 6
2 | (Spain) Nuria Llagostera Vives (Spain) María José Martínez Sánchez | 6 | 4 | 4

Final
1 | (United States) Serena Williams (United States) Venus Williams | 6 | 6
12 | (Czech Republic) Květa Peschke (Slovenia) Katarina Srebotnik | 2 | 3

=== Top half ===
==== Section 1 ====
First round
1 | (United States) S Williams (United States) V Williams | 6 | 6
(Belgium) K Flipkens (Thailand) T Tanasugarn | 0 | 1
(Slovakia) D Hantuchová (Denmark) C Wozniacki | 7 | 7^{10}
(Germany) T Malek (Germany) A Petkovic | 5 | 6^{8}
(Slovakia) D Cibulková (Germany) J Görges | 3 | 6 | 6
WC | (France) S Cohen-Aloro (France) P Parmentier | 6 | 2 | 1
(Austria) S Bammer (Germany) K Barrois | 4 | 1
16 | (Czech Republic) A Hlaváčková (Czech Republic) L Hradecká | 6 | 6
11 | (Russia) M Kirilenko (Poland) A Radwańska | 6 | 6
(Chinese Taipei) K-c Chang (Slovakia) M Rybáriková | 1 | 1
(Greece) E Daniilidou (Chinese Taipei) S-w Hsieh | 5 | 6^{1}
(Czech Republic) P Kvitová (Switzerland) S Vögele | 7 | 7^{7}
(South Africa) N Grandin (United States) A Spears | 3 | 6 | 2
(France) A Cornet (France) A Rezaï | 6 | 4 | 6
(Poland) A Rosolska (Kazakhstan) Y Shvedova | 6^{4} | 4
7 | (United States) L Raymond (Australia) R Stubbs | 7^{7} | 6

Second round
1 | (United States) S Williams (United States) V Williams
(Slovakia) D Hantuchová (Denmark) C Wozniacki | w/o
(Slovakia) D Cibulková (Germany) J Görges | 2 | 7^{10} | 0
16 | (Czech Republic) A Hlaváčková (Czech Republic) L Hradecká | 6 | 6^{8} | 6
11 | (Russia) M Kirilenko (Poland) A Radwańska | 6 | 5 | 6
(Czech Republic) P Kvitová (Switzerland) S Vögele | 1 | 7 | 3
(France) A Cornet (France) A Rezaï | 2 | 2
7 | (United States) L Raymond (Australia) R Stubbs | 6 | 6

Third round
1 | (United States) S Williams (United States) V Williams | 6 | 6
16 | (Czech Republic) A Hlaváčková (Czech Republic) L Hradecká | 1 | 2
11 | (Russia) M Kirilenko (Poland) A Radwańska | 7^{8} | 6
7 | (United States) L Raymond (Australia) R Stubbs | 6^{6} | 4

Quarterfinals
1 | (United States) S Williams (United States) V Williams | 6 | 6
11 | (Russia) M Kirilenko (Poland) A Radwańska | 2 | 3

==== Section 2 ====
First round
3 | (United States) L Huber (Spain) A Medina Garrigues | 2 | 6 | 6
(Ukraine) M Koryttseva (Belarus) D Kustova | 6 | 1 | 4
(Belarus) V Azarenka (Russia) V Zvonareva | 6 | 6
(Hungary) M Czink (Spain) A Parra Santonja | 1 | 3
(Sweden) S Arvidsson (Germany) A Kerber | 2 | 5
(Czech Republic) L Šafářová (Canada) A Wozniak | 6 | 7
(Chinese Taipei) C-j Chuang (Australia) A Molik | 6^{2} | 3
13 | (Czech Republic) I Benešová (Czech Republic) B Záhlavová-Strýcová | 7^{7} | 6
9 | (United States) B Mattek-Sands (China) Z Yan | 6 | 6
(Switzerland) T Bacsinszky (Italy) T Garbin | 3 | 3
(Italy) S Errani (Italy) R Vinci | 6 | 7
WC | (France) K Mladenovic (Tunisia) S Sfar | 4 | 5
(United States) J Craybas (Russia) A Pavlyuchenkova | 1 | 4
(Italy) A Brianti (Romania) A Dulgheru | 6 | 6
(France) J Coin (Canada) M-È Pelletier | 1 | 3
5 | (Argentina) G Dulko (Italy) F Pennetta | 6 | 6

Second round
3 | (United States) L Huber (Spain) A Medina Garrigues | 4 | 6 | 6
(Belarus) V Azarenka (Russia) V Zvonareva | 6 | 2 | 4
(Czech Republic) L Šafářová (Canada) A Wozniak | 1 | 1
13 | (Czech Republic) I Benešová (Czech Republic) B Záhlavová-Strýcová | 6 | 6
9 | (United States) B Mattek-Sands (China) Z Yan | 6 | 7
(Italy) S Errani (Italy) R Vinci | 4 | 5
(Italy) A Brianti (Romania) A Dulgheru | 5 | 6^{2}
5 | (Argentina) G Dulko (Italy) F Pennetta | 7 | 7^{7}

Third round
3 | (United States) L Huber (Spain) A Medina Garrigues | 7 | 2 | 6
13 | (Czech Republic) I Benešová (Czech Republic) B Záhlavová-Strýcová | 5 | 6 | 4
9 | (United States) B Mattek-Sands (China) Z Yan | 6^{7} | 0
5 | (Argentina) G Dulko (Italy) F Pennetta | 7^{9} | 6

Quarterfinals
3 | (United States) L Huber (Spain) A Medina Garrigues | 1 | 6 | 7^{7}
5 | (Argentina) G Dulko (Italy) F Pennetta | 6 | 0 | 6^{4}

=== Bottom half ===
==== Section 3 ====
First round
6 | (Zimbabwe) C Black (Russia) E Vesnina | 4 | 6 | 6
(Spain) V Ruano Pascual (United States) M Shaughnessy | 6 | 3 | 3
Alt | (Czech Republic) K Zakopalová (United States) R Zalameda | 1 | 1
(Hungary) Á Szávay (Russia) D Safina | 6 | 6
(Romania) E Gallovits (United States) M Oudin | 6 | 6
(Australia) An Rodionova (Russia) Ar Rodionova | 3 | 2
(United Kingdom) S Borwell (United States) R Kops-Jones | 0 | 1
12 | (Czech Republic) K Peschke (Slovenia) K Srebotnik | 6 | 6
14 | (Russia) V Dushevina (Russia) E Makarova | 6^{5} | 7^{7} | 6
(Belarus) T Poutchek (Turkey) İ Şenoğlu | 7^{7} | 6^{3} | 4
(Ukraine) A Bondarenko (Ukraine) K Bondarenko | 6 | 6
(United States) C Gullickson (Slovenia) P Hercog | 3 | 2
(United States) V King (Netherlands) M Krajicek | 6 | 6
(Romania) IR Olaru (Ukraine) O Savchuk | 4 | 3
WC | (France) I Pavlovic (France) L Thorpe | 4 | 4
4 | (Russia) N Petrova (Australia) S Stosur | 6 | 6

Second round
6 | (Zimbabwe) C Black (Russia) E Vesnina | 6 | 6
(Hungary) Á Szávay (Russia) D Safina | 2 | 3
(Romania) E Gallovits (United States) M Oudin | 0 | 1
12 | (Czech Republic) K Peschke (Slovenia) K Srebotnik | 6 | 6
14 | (Russia) V Dushevina (Russia) E Makarova | 3 | 2
(Ukraine) A Bondarenko (Ukraine) K Bondarenko | 6 | 6
(United States) V King (Netherlands) M Krajicek | 4 | 7^{7} | 4
4 | (Russia) N Petrova (Australia) S Stosur | 6 | 6^{5} | 6

Third round
6 | (Zimbabwe) C Black (Russia) E Vesnina | 6^{5} | 1
12 | (Czech Republic) K Peschke (Slovenia) K Srebotnik | 7^{7} | 6
(Ukraine) A Bondarenko (Ukraine) K Bondarenko | 6 | 1
4 | (Russia) N Petrova (Australia) S Stosur | 1 | 0 | r

Quarterfinals
12 | (Czech Republic) K Peschke (Slovenia) K Srebotnik | 4 | 6 | 6
(Ukraine) A Bondarenko (Ukraine) K Bondarenko | 6 | 2 | 3

==== Section 4 ====
First round
8 | (Russia) A Kleybanova (Italy) F Schiavone | 6 | 6
WC | (France) S Beltrame (France) Y Fedossova | 0 | 2
(Romania) M Niculescu (Israel) S Pe'er | 6 | 6
WC | (France) S Lefèvre (France) A Védy | 4 | 3
(Poland) K Jans (Switzerland) P Schnyder | 7^{7} | 4 | 3
(Russia) R Kulikova (Latvia) A Sevastova | 6^{4} | 6 | 6
(Uzbekistan) A Amanmuradova (Kazakhstan) G Voskoboeva | 1 | 1
10 | (Chinese Taipei) Y-j Chan (China) J Zheng | 6 | 6
15 | (Belarus) O Govortsova (Russia) A Kudryavtseva | 6 | 6
(Romania) S Cîrstea (France) V Razzano | 2 | 2
(Belarus) E Dzehalevich (Czech Republic) R Voráčová | 4 | 2
(Russia) M Kondratieva (Czech Republic) V Uhlířová | 6 | 6
Alt | (Croatia) D Jurak (Croatia) P Martić | 6^{6} | 6 | 7^{7}
WC | (France) C Feuerstein (France) S Foretz | 7^{8} | 2 | 6^{4}
WC | (France) M Johansson (France) C Pin | 3 | 2
2 | (Spain) N Llagostera Vives (Spain) MJ Martínez Sánchez | 6 | 6

Second round
8 | (Russia) A Kleybanova (Italy) F Schiavone | 2 | 6^{5}
(Romania) M Niculescu (Israel) S Pe'er | 6 | 7^{7}
(Russia) R Kulikova (Latvia) A Sevastova | 4 | 3
10 | (Chinese Taipei) Y-j Chan (China) J Zheng | 6 | 6
15 | (Belarus) O Govortsova (Russia) A Kudryavtseva | 6 | 6
(Russia) M Kondratieva (Czech Republic) V Uhlířová | 3 | 1
Alt | (Croatia) D Jurak (Croatia) P Martić | 2 | 3
2 | (Spain) N Llagostera Vives (Spain) MJ Martínez Sánchez | 6 | 6

Third round
(Romania) M Niculescu (Israel) S Pe'er | 6 | 6
10 | (Chinese Taipei) Y-j Chan (China) J Zheng | 2 | 1
15 | (Belarus) O Govortsova (Russia) A Kudryavtseva | 0 | 4
2 | (Spain) N Llagostera Vives (Spain) MJ Martínez Sánchez | 6 | 6

Quarterfinals
(Romania) M Niculescu (Israel) S Pe'er | 2 | 4
2 | (Spain) N Llagostera Vives (Spain) MJ Martínez Sánchez | 6 | 6
