= 2010 French Open – Legends over 45 doubles =

Legends over 45 doubles
- 2010 French Open

Final
- Champions: (Ecuador) Andrés Gómez (United States) John McEnroe
- Runners-up: (Iran) Mansour Bahrami (France) Henri Leconte
- Score: 6–1, 6–1

Events
Singles	men	women		boys	girls
Doubles	men	women	mixed	boys	girls
WC Singles	men	women	quad
WC Doubles	men	women	quad
Legends	−45	45+	women
← 2009 ·	French Open	· 2011 →

Anders Järryd and John McEnroe were the defending champions, but Järryd chose not to compete this year.

McEnroe partnered up with Andrés Gómez, and they won in the final 6–1, 6–1 against Mansour Bahrami and Henri Leconte.

== Draw ==
=== Key ===
- Q = Qualifier
- WC = Wild card
- LL = Lucky loser
- Alt = Alternate
- ITF = ITF entry
- PR = Protected ranking
- SR = Special ranking
- SE = Special exempt
- JE = Junior exempt
- JR = Junior Accelerator Programme entrant
- CO = College Accelerator Programme entrant
- NG = Next Gen Accelerator Program entrant
- w/o = Walkover
- r = Retired
- d = Defaulted

=== Final ===
Final
1	(Ecuador) Andrés Gómez (United States) John McEnroe	6	6
2	(Iran) Mansour Bahrami (France) Henri Leconte	1	1

=== Group A ===
	(Ecuador) Gómez (United States) McEnroe	(Sweden) Nyström (Sweden) Wilander	(Australia) Cash (Sweden) Pernfors	RR; W–L	Set; W–L	Game; W–L	Standings
(Ecuador) Andrés Gómez (United States) John McEnroe		6–2, 6–2	6–0, 6–1	2–0	4–0	24–5	1
(Sweden) Joakim Nyström (Sweden) Mats Wilander	2–6, 2–6		7–6(4), 6–3	1–1	2–2	17–21	2
(Australia) Pat Cash (Sweden) Mikael Pernfors	0–6, 1–6	6(4)–7, 3–6		0–2	0–4	10–25	3

Standings are determined by: 1. number of wins; 2. number of matches; 3. in three-players-ties, percentage of sets won, or of games won; 4. steering-committee decision.

=== Group B ===
	(Iran) Bahrami (France) Leconte	(Romania) Năstase (Spain) Sánchez	(France) Forget (France) Tulasne	RR; W–L	Set; W–L	Game; W–L	Standings
(Iran) Mansour Bahrami (France) Henri Leconte		7–6(4), 3–6, [12–10]	6–4, 7–6(5)	2–0	4–1	24–22	1
(Romania) Ilie Năstase (Spain) Emilio Sánchez	6–7(4), 6–3, [10–12]		6–1, 1–6, [10–7]	1–1	3–3	20–18	2
(France) Guy Forget (France) Thierry Tulasne	4–6, 6–7(5)	1–6, 6–1, [7–10]		0–2	1–4	17–21	3

Standings are determined by: 1. number of wins; 2. number of matches; 3. in three-players-ties, percentage of sets won, or of games won; 4. steering-committee decision.
