= 2010 French Open – Mixed doubles =

Tennis tournament

Mixed doubles
- 2010 French Open

Final
- Champions: (Slovenia) Katarina Srebotnik (Serbia) Nenad Zimonjić
- Runners-up: (Kazakhstan) Yaroslava Shvedova (Austria) Julian Knowle
- Score: 4–6, 7–6^{(7–5)}, [11–9]

Details
- Draw: 32
- Seeds: 8

Events
Singles	men	women		boys	girls
Doubles	men	women	mixed	boys	girls
WC Singles	men	women	quad
WC Doubles	men	women	quad
Legends	−45	45+	women
- French Open

Katarina Srebotnik and Nenad Zimonjić defeated Yaroslava Shvedova and Julian Knowle in the final, 4–6, 7–6^{(7–5)}, [11–9] to win the mixed doubles tennis title at the 2010 French Open.

Liezel Huber and Bob Bryan were the reigning champions, but Bryan chose to not compete this year in mixed doubles. Huber partnered Mahesh Bhupathi, but they lost in the first round to Chan Yung-jan and Eric Butorac.

== Seeds ==
1. (United States) Liezel Huber / (India) Mahesh Bhupathi (first round)
2. (Zimbabwe) Cara Black / (India) Leander Paes (quarterfinals)
3. (Spain) Nuria Llagostera Vives / (Austria) Oliver Marach (semifinals)
4. (United States) Bethanie Mattek-Sands / (The Bahamas) Mark Knowles (first round)
5. (Russia) Alisa Kleybanova / (Belarus) Max Mirnyi (quarterfinals)
6. (Slovenia) Katarina Srebotnik / (Serbia) Nenad Zimonjić (champions)
7. (United States) Lisa Raymond / (South Africa) Wesley Moodie (first round)
8. (China) Yan Zi / (Poland) Mariusz Fyrstenberg (first round)

== Draw ==
Key

- Q = Qualifier
- WC = Wild card
- LL = Lucky loser
- Alt = Alternate
- ITF = ITF entry
- PR = Protected ranking
- SR = Special ranking
- SE = Special exempt
- JE = Junior exempt
- JR = Junior Accelerator Programme entrant
- CO = College Accelerator Programme entrant
- NG = Next Gen Accelerator Program entrant
- w/o = Walkover
- r = Retired
- d = Defaulted

=== Finals ===
Semifinals
6	(Slovenia) Katarina Srebotnik (Serbia) Nenad Zimonjić	4	6	[11]
3	(Spain) Nuria Llagostera Vives (Austria) Oliver Marach	6	3	[9]
(United States) Vania King (Germany) Christopher Kas	4	4
(Kazakhstan) Yaroslava Shvedova (Austria) Julian Knowle	6	6

Final
6	(Slovenia) Katarina Srebotnik (Serbia) Nenad Zimonjić	4	7^{7}	[11]
(Kazakhstan) Yaroslava Shvedova (Austria) Julian Knowle	6	6^{5}	[9]

=== Top half ===
First round
1	(United States) L Huber (India) M Bhupathi	1	4
(Chinese Taipei) Y-j Chan (United States) E Butorac	6	6
WC	(France) K Mladenovic (France) A Sidorenko	2	3
WC	(France) A Védy (France) M Llodra	6	6
(Russia) E Vesnina (Israel) A Ram	6	6
WC	(France) M Johansson (France) S de Chaunac	2	1
(Spain) A Medina Garrigues (Spain) M López	2	3
6	(Slovenia) K Srebotnik (Serbia) N Zimonjić	6	6
3	(Spain) N Llagostera Vives (Austria) O Marach	6	6
(France) V Razzano (Belgium) D Norman	3	3
WC	(France) S Cohen-Aloro (France) T Ascione	6	2	[11]
(Czech Republic) I Benešová (Czech Republic) L Dlouhý	3	6	[9]
WC	(France) J Coin (France) N Mahut	1	6	[10]
(Russia) E Makarova (Romania) H Tecău	6	1	[5]
Alt	(Russia) A Pavlyuchenkova (United Kingdom) R Hutchins	6	3	[8]
5	(Russia) A Kleybanova (Belarus) M Mirnyi	3	6	[10]

Second round
(Chinese Taipei) Y-j Chan (United States) E Butorac	6^{7}	7	[8]
WC	(France) A Védy (France) M Llodra	7^{9}	5	[10]
(Russia) E Vesnina (Israel) A Ram	3	7^{8}	[8]
6	(Slovenia) K Srebotnik (Serbia) N Zimonjić	6	6^{6}	[10]
3	(Spain) N Llagostera Vives (Austria) O Marach	5	6	[10]
WC	(France) S Cohen-Aloro (France) T Ascione	7	2	[8]
WC	(France) J Coin (France) N Mahut	2	3
5	(Russia) A Kleybanova (Belarus) M Mirnyi	6	6

Quarterfinals
WC	(France) A Védy (France) M Llodra	7^{7}	3	[3]
6	(Slovenia) K Srebotnik (Serbia) N Zimonjić	6^{5}	6	[10]
3	(Spain) N Llagostera Vives (Austria) O Marach	7^{9}	7^{9}
5	(Russia) A Kleybanova (Belarus) M Mirnyi	6^{7}	6^{7}

Semifinals
6	(Slovenia) K Srebotnik (Serbia) N Zimonjić	4	6	[11]
3	(Spain) N Llagostera Vives (Austria) O Marach	6	3	[9]

=== Bottom half ===
First round
7	(United States) L Raymond (South Africa) W Moodie	6^{4}	3
(United States) V King (Germany) C Kas	7^{7}	6
Alt	(Uzbekistan) A Amanmuradova (Pakistan) A-u-H Qureshi	6	6^{4}	[10]
Alt	(Chinese Taipei) C-j Chuang (Slovakia) F Polášek	2	7^{7}	[3]
(Czech Republic) A Hlaváčková (Slovakia) M Mertiňák	6	5	[10]
(Romania) M Niculescu (Germany) M Kohlmann	2	7	[8]
(Italy) T Garbin (Poland) M Matkowski	7^{7}	6
4	(United States) B Mattek-Sands (The Bahamas) M Knowles	6^{4}	1
8	(China) Z Yan (Poland) M Fyrstenberg	4	4
(Kazakhstan) Y Shvedova (Austria) J Knowle	6	6
(Czech Republic) B Záhlavová-Strýcová (Czech Republic) F Čermák	6	2	[16]
(Switzerland) P Schnyder (Canada) D Nestor	2	6	[14]
(Australia) R Stubbs (Sweden) R Lindstedt	3	6	[4]
(Chinese Taipei) S-w Hsieh (Brazil) B Soares	6	4	[10]
WC	(France) P Parmentier (France) M Gicquel	3	3
2	(Zimbabwe) C Black (India) L Paes	6	6

Second round
(United States) V King (Germany) C Kas	6^{3}	6	[10]
Alt	(Uzbekistan) A Amanmuradova (Pakistan) A-u-H Qureshi	7^{7}	3	[7]
(Czech Republic) A Hlaváčková (Slovakia) M Mertiňák	3	2
(Italy) T Garbin (Poland) M Matkowski	6	6
(Kazakhstan) Y Shvedova (Austria) J Knowle	6	6
(Czech Republic) B Záhlavová-Strýcová (Czech Republic) F Čermák	3	3
(Chinese Taipei) S-w Hsieh (Brazil) B Soares	5	6	[8]
2	(Zimbabwe) C Black (India) L Paes	7	2	[10]

Quarterfinals
(United States) V King (Germany) C Kas	6	3	[10]
(Italy) T Garbin (Poland) M Matkowski	4	6	[7]
(Kazakhstan) Y Shvedova (Austria) J Knowle	6	6^{2}	[10]
2	(Zimbabwe) C Black (India) L Paes	3	7^{7}	[7]

Semifinals
(United States) V King (Germany) C Kas	4	4
(Kazakhstan) Y Shvedova (Austria) J Knowle	6	6
