= 2010 French Open – Men's doubles =

Men's doubles
- 2010 French Open

Final
- Champions: (Canada) Daniel Nestor (Serbia) Nenad Zimonjić
- Runners-up: (Czech Republic) Lukáš Dlouhý (India) Leander Paes
- Score: 7–5, 6–2

Details
- Draw: 64
- Seeds: 16

Events
Singles	men	women		boys	girls
Doubles	men	women	mixed	boys	girls
WC Singles	men	women	quad
WC Doubles	men	women	quad
Legends	−45	45+	women
← 2009 ·	French Open	· 2011 →

Lukáš Dlouhý and Leander Paes were the defending champions, but they lost in the final to Daniel Nestor and Nenad Zimonjić.

== Seeds ==
1. (United States) Bob Bryan / (United States) Mike Bryan (second round)
2. (Canada) Daniel Nestor / (Serbia) Nenad Zimonjić (champions)
3. (Czech Republic) Lukáš Dlouhý / (India) Leander Paes (final)
4. (South Africa) Wesley Moodie / (Belgium) Dick Norman (semifinals)
5. (India) Mahesh Bhupathi / (Belarus) Max Mirnyi (second round)
6. (Poland) Łukasz Kubot / (Austria) Oliver Marach (quarterfinals)
7. (Sweden) Simon Aspelin / (Australia) Paul Hanley (first round)
8. (Poland) Mariusz Fyrstenberg / (Poland) Marcin Matkowski (quarterfinals)
9. (Czech Republic) František Čermák / (Slovakia) Michal Mertiňák (third round)
10. (Austria) Julian Knowle / (Israel) Andy Ram (semifinals)
11. (Spain) Marcel Granollers / (Spain) Tommy Robredo (first round)
12. (United States) John Isner / (United States) Sam Querrey (withdrew)
13. (United States) Mardy Fish / (The Bahamas) Mark Knowles (second round)
14. (Sweden) Robert Lindstedt / (Romania) Horia Tecău (first round)
15. (France) Julien Benneteau / (France) Michaël Llodra (third round)
16. (United States) Eric Butorac / (United States) Rajeev Ram (first round)

== Draw ==
=== Finals ===
Quarterfinals
(Brazil) Marcelo Melo (Brazil) Bruno Soares	7^{7}	2	0
10	(Austria) Julian Knowle (Israel) Andy Ram	6^{3}	6	6
3	(Czech Republic) Lukáš Dlouhý (India) Leander Paes	6	6
8	(Poland) Mariusz Fyrstenberg (Poland) Marcin Matkowski	1	3
(Spain) Marc López (Spain) Pere Riba	1	4
4	(South Africa) Wesley Moodie (Belgium) Dick Norman	6	6
6	(Poland) Łukasz Kubot (Austria) Oliver Marach	5	3
2	(Canada) Daniel Nestor (Serbia) Nenad Zimonjić	7	6

Semifinals
10	(Austria) Julian Knowle (Israel) Andy Ram	4	2
3	(Czech Republic) Lukáš Dlouhý (India) Leander Paes	6	6
4	(South Africa) Wesley Moodie (Belgium) Dick Norman	0	3
2	(Canada) Daniel Nestor (Serbia) Nenad Zimonjić	6	6

Final
3	(Czech Republic) Lukáš Dlouhý (India) Leander Paes	5	2
2	(Canada) Daniel Nestor (Serbia) Nenad Zimonjić	7	6

=== Top half ===
==== Section 1 ====
First round
1	(United States) B Bryan (United States) M Bryan	6	6
(Czech Republic) J Hájek (Slovakia) L Lacko	3	1
(Brazil) M Melo (Brazil) B Soares	6	2	6
(Argentina) JI Chela (Argentina) E Schwank	2	6	2
(Czech Republic) M Damm (Slovakia) F Polášek	1	3
(Italy) D Bracciali (Italy) P Starace	6	6
(Germany) B Becker (United States) S Lipsky	6	5	6
16	(United States) E Butorac (United States) R Ram	3	7	4
10	(Austria) J Knowle (Israel) A Ram	7	7^{7}
(France) A Clément (France) N Mahut	5	6^{0}
Alt	(United States) J Cerretani (Canada) A Shamasdin	4	6	4
(France) G Monfils (France) J Ouanna	6	2	6
(Spain) N Almagro (Spain) S Ventura
(Belgium) X Malisse (Belgium) O Rochus	w/o
WC	(France) M Gicquel (France) É Roger-Vasselin	2	6	7^{10}
7	(Sweden) S Aspelin (Australia) P Hanley	6	4	6^{8}

Second round
1	(United States) B Bryan (United States) M Bryan	3	6^{6}
(Brazil) M Melo (Brazil) B Soares	6	7^{8}
(Italy) D Bracciali (Italy) P Starace	6	6
(Germany) B Becker (United States) S Lipsky	3	1
10	(Austria) J Knowle (Israel) A Ram	6	7^{7}
(France) G Monfils (France) J Ouanna	3	6^{4}
(Spain) N Almagro (Spain) S Ventura	6	7^{7}
WC	(France) M Gicquel (France) É Roger-Vasselin	1	6^{4}

Third round
(Brazil) M Melo (Brazil) B Soares	7^{7}	7^{9}
(Italy) D Bracciali (Italy) P Starace	6^{2}	6^{7}
10	(Austria) J Knowle (Israel) A Ram	7^{7}	6
(Spain) N Almagro (Spain) S Ventura	6^{4}	2

Quarterfinals
(Brazil) M Melo (Brazil) B Soares	7^{7}	2	0
10	(Austria) J Knowle (Israel) A Ram	6^{3}	6	6

==== Section 2 ====
First round
3	(Czech Republic) L Dlouhý (India) L Paes	6	6^{6}	7
(Sweden) J Brunström (Netherlands Antilles) J-J Rojer	3	7^{8}	5
(Germany) P Marx (Slovakia) I Zelenay	6^{1}	3
Alt	(Switzerland) Y Allegro (Germany) A Beck	7^{7}	6
(Serbia) V Troicki (Serbia) D Vemić	6	6
(South Africa) J Coetzee (Italy) A Seppi	3	4
(Mexico) S González (United States) T Rettenmaier	6	6
14	(Sweden) R Lindstedt (Romania) H Tecău	4	4
Alt	(United Kingdom) J Delgado (Kazakhstan) E Korolev	3	5
WC	(France) T Ascione (France) L Recouderc	6	7
(Kazakhstan) A Golubev (Italy) P Lorenzi	6	7^{7}
(Colombia) A Falla (Colombia) S Giraldo	2	6^{3}
(Romania) V Hǎnescu (Romania) G Trifu	7^{7}	1	5
(Ukraine) A Dolgopolov (Uzbekistan) D Istomin	6^{4}	6	7
(Poland) T Bednarek (Poland) M Kowalczyk	6^{4}	2
8	(Poland) M Fyrstenberg (Poland) M Matkowski	7^{7}	6

Second round
3	(Czech Republic) L Dlouhý (India) L Paes	6	3	6
Alt	(Switzerland) Y Allegro (Germany) A Beck	4	6	3
(Serbia) V Troicki (Serbia) D Vemić	6	5	4
(Mexico) S González (United States) T Rettenmaier	4	7	6
WC	(France) T Ascione (France) L Recouderc	4	6	6
(Kazakhstan) A Golubev (Italy) P Lorenzi	6	3	4
(Ukraine) A Dolgopolov (Uzbekistan) D Istomin	1	4
8	(Poland) M Fyrstenberg (Poland) M Matkowski	6	6

Third round
3	(Czech Republic) L Dlouhý (India) L Paes	6	6
(Mexico) S González (United States) T Rettenmaier	3	4
WC	(France) T Ascione (France) L Recouderc	6	2	6^{5}
8	(Poland) M Fyrstenberg (Poland) M Matkowski	3	6	7^{7}

Quarterfinals
3	(Czech Republic) L Dlouhý (India) L Paes	6	6
8	(Poland) M Fyrstenberg (Poland) M Matkowski	1	3

=== Bottom half ===
==== Section 3 ====
First round
5	(India) M Bhupathi (Belarus) M Mirnyi	6	6
(Austria) J Melzer (Germany) P Petzschner	3	2
(Spain) M López (Spain) P Riba	6	6
WC	(France) J Eysseric (France) B Paire	2	4
(Ukraine) S Stakhovsky (Russia) M Youzhny	3	7^{7}	6
(Spain) D Marrero (France) S Robert	6	6^{5}	4
(South Africa) R de Voest (Russia) D Tursunov	3	6	2
9	(Czech Republic) F Čermák (Slovakia) M Mertiňák	6	4	6
15	(France) J Benneteau (France) M Llodra	7	6
(Czech Republic) L Friedl (Czech Republic) D Škoch	5	2
(India) R Bopanna (Pakistan) A-u-H Qureshi	6	6
(Italy) F Fognini (United States) M Russell	2	3
(United Kingdom) C Fleming (United Kingdom) K Skupski	3	6	6
(Switzerland) M Chiudinelli (Germany) C Kas	6	3	4
(Spain) G García López (Spain) A Montañés	3	3
4	(South Africa) W Moodie (Belgium) D Norman	6	6

Second round
5	(India) M Bhupathi (Belarus) M Mirnyi	4	6^{4}
(Spain) M López (Spain) P Riba	6	7^{7}
(Ukraine) S Stakhovsky (Russia) M Youzhny	3	2
9	(Czech Republic) F Čermák (Slovakia) M Mertiňák	6	6
15	(France) J Benneteau (France) M Llodra	7	6
(India) R Bopanna (Pakistan) A-u-H Qureshi	5	3
(United Kingdom) C Fleming (United Kingdom) K Skupski	6^{5}	6	6^{4}
4	(South Africa) W Moodie (Belgium) D Norman	7^{7}	4	7^{7}

Third round
(Spain) M López (Spain) P Riba	7	6
9	(Czech Republic) F Čermák (Slovakia) M Mertiňák	5	4
15	(France) J Benneteau (France) M Llodra	4	4
4	(South Africa) W Moodie (Belgium) D Norman	6	6

Quarterfinals
(Spain) M López (Spain) P Riba	1	4
4	(South Africa) W Moodie (Belgium) D Norman	6	6

==== Section 4 ====
First round
6	(Poland) Ł Kubot (Austria) O Marach	6	6
(Netherlands) T de Bakker (Netherlands) R Wassen	4	3
(Germany) M Kohlmann (Finland) J Nieminen	5	3
(Argentina) L Mayer (Argentina) H Zeballos	7	6
(Argentina) S Prieto (Belgium) K Vliegen	6^{2}	6^{4}
(Israel) J Erlich (Israel) D Sela	7^{7}	7^{7}
(Australia) S Huss (Brazil) A Sá	7^{7}	7
11	(Spain) M Granollers (Spain) T Robredo	6^{5}	5
13	(United States) M Fish (The Bahamas) M Knowles	7	7^{8}
(Australia) C Ball (Australia) C Guccione	5	6^{6}
Alt	(Brazil) T Alves (Brazil) M Torres	1	3
WC	(France) G Rufin (France) A Sidorenko	6	6
Alt	(United Kingdom) J Marray (United Kingdom) J Murray	4	3
(Germany) S Greul (Australia) P Luczak	6	6
(United Kingdom) R Hutchins (Australia) J Kerr	6^{5}	6	6^{3}
2	(Canada) D Nestor (Serbia) N Zimonjić	7^{7}	4	7^{7}

Second round
6	(Poland) Ł Kubot (Austria) O Marach	6	6^{8}	6
(Argentina) L Mayer (Argentina) H Zeballos	4	7^{10}	3
(Israel) J Erlich (Israel) D Sela	4	4
(Australia) S Huss (Brazil) A Sá	6	6
13	(United States) M Fish (The Bahamas) M Knowles	6	2	1
WC	(France) G Rufin (France) A Sidorenko	0	6	6
(Germany) S Greul (Australia) P Luczak	1	4
2	(Canada) D Nestor (Serbia) N Zimonjić	6	6

Third round
6	(Poland) Ł Kubot (Austria) O Marach	6	7
(Australia) S Huss (Brazil) A Sá	4	5
WC	(France) G Rufin (France) A Sidorenko	7^{7}	4	3
2	(Canada) D Nestor (Serbia) N Zimonjić	6^{2}	6	6

Quarterfinals
6	(Poland) Ł Kubot (Austria) O Marach	5	3
2	(Canada) D Nestor (Serbia) N Zimonjić	7	6
