= Big Three (tennis) =

Famous trio of tennis players

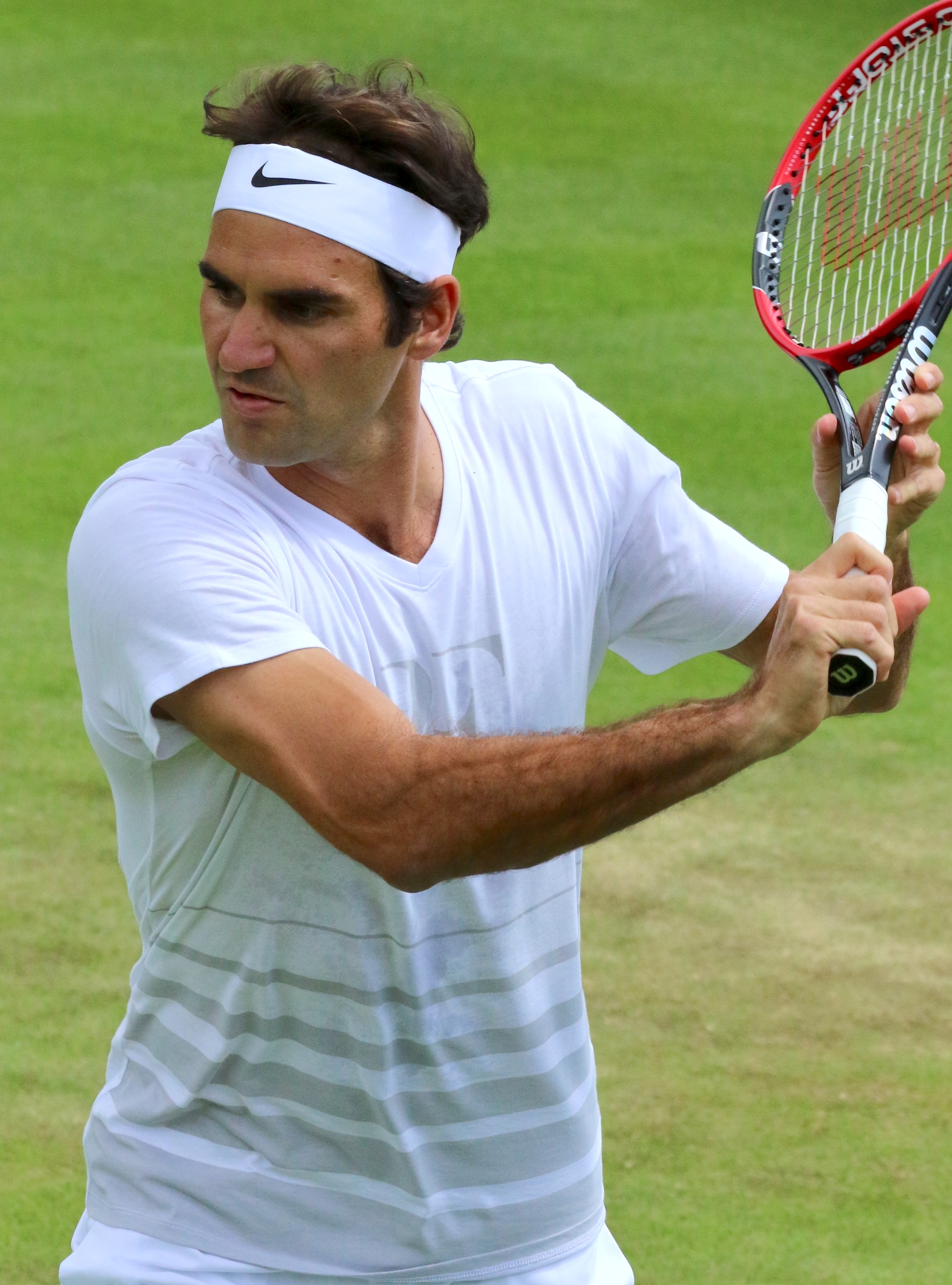
Roger Federer

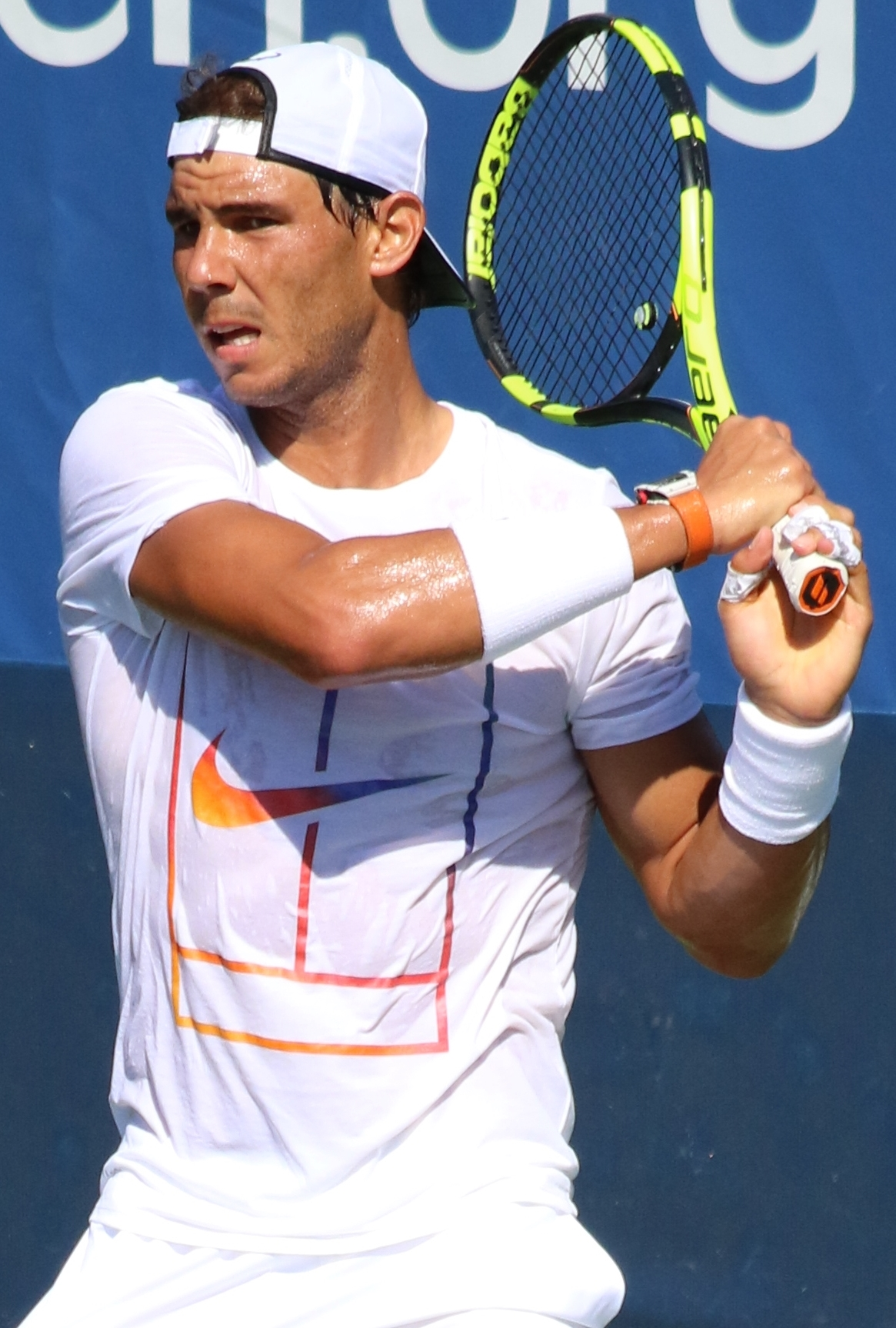
Rafael Nadal

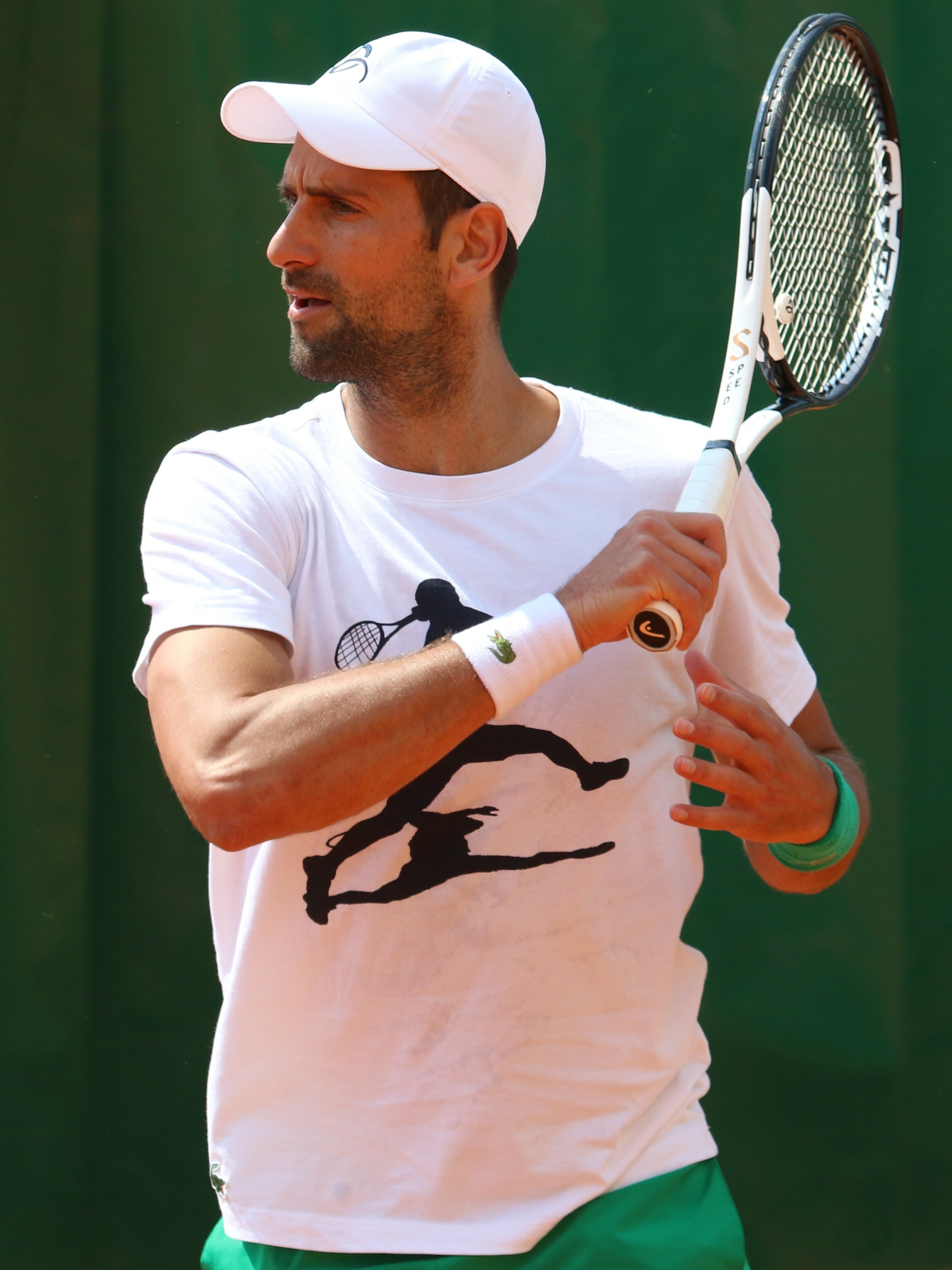
Novak Djokovic

The Big Three is a common name in tennis for men's players Roger Federer, Rafael Nadal and Novak Djokovic. Their careers and rivalries overlapped for much of two decades, during which they occupied the top of the men's singles game and won at least one major in every season from 2003 to 2023. Andy Murray was frequently grouped with them as the Big Four, particularly during the period when he challenged the trio for the Big Titles and the world No. 1 ranking. Federer retired in 2022 and Nadal in 2024, leaving Djokovic as the only active member of the trio.

From Federer's first major at the 2003 Wimbledon Championships through Djokovic's most recent major at the 2023 US Open, the Big Three combined to win 66 of 81 majors. Djokovic has won 24 major singles titles, Nadal 22 and Federer 20, the three highest totals of all time in men's singles; each player has also completed the career Grand Slam at least once. They have spent a combined 947 weeks at world No. 1: Djokovic for a record 428 weeks, Federer for 310 and Nadal for 209. They are also the three most successful players at the Masters series, with Djokovic winning 40 titles, Nadal 36 and Federer 28.

Federer was the first of the three to reach world No. 1 in 2004, and was dominant before Nadal emerged as his main challenger and displaced him at the top in 2008. Djokovic won his first major that same year and reached No. 1 in 2011, while Murray's rise culminated in 2016 when he ended the Big Three's 666-week hold on the top ranking. The trio again controlled most of the major titles from 2017, and by 2021 all three were level at 20 majors each. Nadal moved ahead with his 21st and 22nd titles in 2022 before Djokovic surpassed him and reached 24 the next year. Rivalries between the three men included 150 matches and 23 major finals; the Djokovic–Nadal rivalry comprised an Open Era record 60 meetings, while Djokovic and Federer played each other 50 times and Federer and Nadal 40.

The period has often been described as a golden era of men's tennis, with the trio's contrasting styles, long-running rivalries and global following contributing to its popularity. Their competition also influenced how each man developed his game and raised the standard faced by their contemporaries, several of whom won fewer major titles than their results elsewhere on the tour might have suggested. The concentration of titles and attention among a small group was criticised for making men's tennis predictable and for overshadowing other players. Their overlapping careers became central to debate over identifying the greatest men's player of all time. Djokovic finished ahead of Federer and Nadal in most significant statistical categories, but comparisons between players from different periods of tennis history continue to be debated.

== Terminology and scope ==
=== Origin and use of the term ===
In men's singles tennis, the term "Big Three" refers to Roger Federer, Rafael Nadal and Novak Djokovic, whose careers and rivalries overlapped with each other. Federer became world No. 1 in February 2004, Nadal soon emerged as a challenger to him, and Djokovic reached No. 1 in July 2011 after joining them at the top of the sport. By December 2012, Tennis.com used "Big 3" for the three players while reporting Andy Murray's view that he had reached their current playing level but had not matched their career achievements.

=== Andy Murray and the Big Four ===
The term "Big Four" adds Andy Murray to the group and was used by BBC Sport in May 2009 for Federer, Nadal, Djokovic and Murray ahead of that year's French Open. After Murray won his first major at the 2012 US Open, The New York Times described the Big Three as having become a Big Four. Murray nevertheless said later that year that, although he was competing at their level, one major title did not place his overall career alongside theirs. By 2014, his results at the majors and Masters 1000 tournaments placed him ahead of almost all contemporaries but well behind Federer, Nadal and Djokovic.

ATP coverage also calls Federer, Nadal, Djokovic and Murray the "Big Four". It uses "Big Three" for Federer, Nadal and Djokovic regarding their 666-week hold on the No. 1 ranking before Murray reached the top in November 2016. The term "Big Four", in this article, is reserved for passages that include Murray alongside the three players.

=== Periodisation ===
Tennis writer Shrivathsa Sridhar dates the trio's uninterrupted run of major-winning seasons from Federer's first Wimbledon title in 2003 through Djokovic's US Open victory in 2023. A 2024 The Guardian retrospective instead dates what it calls the "Big Three dynasty" from Nadal's first French Open title in 2005. The Masters 1000 series comprises nine leading tournaments on the men's tour, and the ATP identifies a Big Four period at that level from the 2008 Madrid Masters through the 2017 Madrid Open, during which the four players won 69 of 78 titles.

The run ended in 2024, when none of the three won a Grand Slam tournament and new generation of players, Jannik Sinner and Carlos Alcaraz divided the four majors between them. Federer retired in 2022 and Nadal at the end of 2024, leaving Djokovic as the only active member of the Big Three.

== History ==
=== Federer-Nadal period, 2003–07 ===
Federer won his first major title at Wimbledon in 2003 and finished the season with seven singles titles on the men's tour, including the Tennis Masters Cup. His victory at the 2004 Australian Open took him to world No. 1 on 2 February and began a record 237 consecutive weeks at the top of the rankings. During this period, Federer won 43 tour-level titles, including 10 majors, and completed a run of five consecutive Wimbledon championships from 2003 to 2007.

Nadal rose from outside the top 50 to No. 2 in 2005, winning 11 titles and his first major at the French Open, where he defeated Federer in the semi-finals. Federer and Nadal finished each season from 2005 to 2007 as the top two players in the ATP rankings. Nadal won the French Open in each of those three seasons, while Federer defeated him in the Wimbledon finals of 2006 and 2007.

Djokovic won his first Masters 1000 title in Miami in 2007 and later defeated world No. 3 Andy Roddick, No. 2 Nadal and No. 1 Federer in succession to win the Canadian Open, then called the Rogers Cup. He reached his first major final at the 2007 US Open, where Federer defeated him in straight sets.

=== Emergence of the Big Four, 2008–10 ===
In 2008, Djokovic won his first major at the Australian Open, defeating Federer in the semi-finals before beating Jo-Wilfried Tsonga in the final. Nadal then won his fourth consecutive French Open and defeated Federer in the Wimbledon final, ending Federer's 65-match winning streak on grass. Nadal replaced Federer as world No. 1 on 18 August 2008, finished the season as No. 1, and ended Federer's 237 consecutive weeks at the top. Murray entered the top four for the first time in September, while Federer won a fifth consecutive US Open title.

In 2009, Federer completed the Career Grand Slam, winning all four majors during one's career, by winning the French Open, and later surpassed Pete Sampras's men's record of 14 major singles titles by winning Wimbledon the following month. Juan Martin del Potro ended Federer's five-year US Open title run by defeating him in the US Open final. In 2010, Nadal won the French Open, Wimbledon and the US Open. In doing so, he completed a Career Grand Slam and became first player to win the last three majors of the season since Rod Laver in 1969 and the first to do so on three different surfaces. Murray reached his second major final at the Australian Open but remained without a major title at the end of the period.

=== Three-way supremacy and Murray's challenge, 2011–16 ===
Djokovic began his 2011 season with seven titles and 41 consecutive victories, then reached world No. 1 after defeating Nadal for his first Wimbledon championship. He also won the Australian Open and defeated Nadal in the US Open final, thus winning three major titles for the season. In 2012, Djokovic defeated Nadal again in the 2012 Australian Open final, a five-hour, 53-minute match that, as of 2026, remains the longest major final in singles. Murray lost the Wimbledon final to Federer but returned to Centre Court four weeks later to defeat him for the Olympic singles gold medal. At the US Open, he defeated Djokovic to win his first major, becoming the first British man in 76 years to win a major singles title.

After missing the second half of 2012, Nadal returned in 2013 and won 10 titles, including the French Open and US Open, compiling a 75–7 record for the season. He defeated Djokovic in five sets in the French Open semi-finals and again in the US Open final. Murray defeated Djokovic in the Wimbledon final to become the first British man to win the men's singles title there since Fred Perry in 1936. In 2014, Stan Wawrinka won his first major at the Australian Open, defeating Djokovic in the quarter-finals and Nadal in the final. At the US Open, Kei Nishikori defeated Djokovic and Marin Cilic defeated Federer in the semi-finals before Cilic beat Nishikori for the title. Djokovic nevertheless finished 2014 as the year-end world No. 1.

In his 2015 season, Djokovic won the Australian Open, Wimbledon and US Open, but was defeated by Wawrinka in the French Open final. Djokovic ended the season by winning the ATP Finals for a fourth consecutive year. In 2016, he won the Australian Open and French Open, becoming the first man since Rod Laver in 1969 to hold all four major titles at the same time and completing a Career Grand Slam. Wawrinka defeated Djokovic in the US Open final to win his third major title. In the same season, Murray won Wimbledon and a second consecutive Olympic singles gold medal, and challenged Djokovic for the No. 1 ranking during the closing months of 2016. He reached No. 1 in November, and this ended the Big Three's 666-week hold on the position. He later defeated Djokovic in the ATP Finals to secure the year-end No. 1 ranking. Murray completed the season with a 78–9 record, nine titles and a 24-match winning streak.

=== Big Three solidified, 2017–20 ===
In 2017, Federer returned from knee surgery at the Australian Open as the world No. 17 and defeated Nadal in five sets to win his first major since Wimbledon in 2012. He later won a record eighth Wimbledon title, while Nadal won the French Open and US Open and finished the season as world No. 1. In 2018, Federer won his 20th major at the Australian Open, his final major title. Nadal successfully defended the French Open but played only nine tour-level events during the season because of injuries. Djokovic, who had dropped to No. 22 after an elbow surgery, won Wimbledon and the US Open and returned to the year-end No. 1 ranking.

In 2019, Djokovic won the Australian Open and then defeated Federer in the longest Wimbledon final, saving two championship points in the deciding set. Nadal won the French Open and US Open and finished the year at No. 1 for the fifth time. The 2020 season was disrupted by the COVID-19 pandemic, and Wimbledon was cancelled; Djokovic won the Australian Open, while Dominic Thiem defeated Alexander Zverev in the US Open final. Nadal defeated Djokovic in the delayed French Open final for his 13th title at the tournament and 20th major, drawing level with Federer. Federer did not compete after reaching semi-finals at the Australian Open and underwent two knee operations before returning the following year.

=== Major-title race and late careers, 2021–23 ===
"I have to pay a great tribute to Rafa and Roger, they are legends of our sport, they are the two most important players I ever faced in my career. They are the reason that I'm where I am today, they've helped me realise what I need to do to get stronger mentally, physically, tactically."

— Djokovic, after winning his 20th major title.

In 2021, Djokovic won the Australian Open, French Open and Wimbledon, bringing his total to 20 majors and drawing level with Federer and Nadal, in addition to becoming the second man ever to win major titles on three different surfaces in one season after Nadal in 2010. He reached the US Open final needing one victory to complete the first men's Grand Slam, winning all four majors in one season, since Rod Laver in 1969, but was defeated by Daniil Medvedev in straight sets.

Nadal returned from a six-month absence caused by a foot injury in 2022 and won the Australian Open, recovering from two sets down against Medvedev to claim a then-record 21st major. He extended the record to 22 by winning his 14th French Open and last major title, while Djokovic won Wimbledon for his 21st major. Federer announced his retirement in September and played his final professional match in doubles with Nadal at the Laver Cup.

In 2023, Djokovic won a record-extending 10th Australian Open title to equal Nadal's total of 22 majors. He surpassed Nadal by winning the French Open for his 23rd major and reached 24 with victory over Medvedev at the US Open. Djokovic also reached the Wimbledon final, but was defeated by Alcaraz in five sets. Nadal sustained a hip injury at the Australian Open and later underwent surgery, limiting his appearances during the season.

=== Retirements and transition, 2024–present ===
In 2024, none of the Big Three won a major for the first time since 2002. Jannik Sinner won the Australian Open and US Open, while Alcaraz won the French Open and Wimbledon. Djokovic defeated Alcaraz in the Olympic final to win his first singles gold medal and complete a career Golden Slam, consisting of all four majors and Olympic singles gold. Nadal played his final match at the Davis Cup Finals in November, two years after Federer's retirement.

Sinner and Alcaraz again divided the four major titles in 2025. Djokovic reached the semi-finals at all four majors without advancing to a final. He remained active after Federer, Murray and Nadal had retired. In 2026, Djokovic defeated defending champion Sinner in the Australian Open semi-finals but lost the final to Alcaraz, who denied him a 25th major. He also reached the Wimbledon semi-finals in July, but was defeated by Sinner in straight sets.

== Extent of the dominance ==
=== Grand Slam tournaments ===
From Federer's first Wimbledon title in 2003 through Djokovic's 2023 US Open victory, the Big Three won 66 of the 81 major tournaments played. Their career totals of 24 majors for Djokovic, 22 for Nadal and 20 for Federer are the three highest in men's singles since the Open Era began in 1968, and they are the only men to have won at least 20. Each has achieved a Career Grand Slam by winning all four majors, with Federer completing the set in 2009, Nadal in 2010 and Djokovic in 2016. Nadal won each major at least twice after winning the 2022 Australian Open. Djokovic became the first man in the Open Era to achieve the same feat at the 2021 French Open and later became the first to win each major at least three times.

Djokovic holds the men's record with 10 Australian Open titles, Nadal with 14 French Open titles and Federer with 8 Wimbledon titles; Federer also shares the Open Era men's record of 5 US Open titles. The same three players occupy the top three places for men's major match victories, with Djokovic having 409 wins, Federer 369 and Nadal 314 as of the 2026 Wimbledon Championships. Federer and Nadal also shared a run of 11 consecutive major titles from the 2005 French Open through the 2007 US Open before Djokovic won the 2008 Australian Open.

=== Rankings and consistency ===
The Big Three has spent a combined 947 weeks at world No. 1: Djokovic for 428 weeks, Federer for 310 and Nadal for 209. Federer held the position for a record 237 consecutive weeks from February 2004, and no player outside the trio reached No. 1 until Murray ended their 666-week sequence in November 2016. Federer and Nadal occupied the top two year-end ranking positions in every season from 2005 through 2010.

All three have returned to No. 1 over spans longer than a decade. Federer had 14 years and 142 days between his first and final days at No. 1, Djokovic 12 years and 341 days, and Nadal 11 years and 168 days; no other man has a span of more than ten years. Djokovic has finished a record eight seasons as world No. 1, while Federer and Nadal each have done it five times. Murray was the only other year-end No. 1 from 2004 through 2021; Alcaraz became the first player outside the Big Four to finish a season at No. 1 since Andy Roddick in 2003. Medvedev had already ended the Big Four's hold on the weekly No. 1 ranking in February 2022, becoming the first man outside that group to reach the top since Roddick in 2004.

=== Across the tour ===
The trio also led the ATP Masters 1000 series, which began in 1990. Djokovic has won 40 titles, Nadal 36 and Federer 28, placing all three ahead of every other player in the series. They also occupy the top three places for Masters 1000 match victories. During the most concentrated phase of Big Four dominance, Djokovic, Nadal, Murray and Federer won 69 of the 78 Masters titles from the 2008 Madrid Open through the 2017 Madrid Open.

At the ATP Finals, the season-ending tournament for eight leading players, Djokovic has won a record seven titles and Federer has won six. Nadal qualified for the event 17 times and was runner-up in 2010 and 2013, but never won the title. Federer has won 103 tour-level singles titles and Nadal 92, while Djokovic reached 102 in October 2026; all three are among the five men with more than 80 titles in the Open Era.

The ATP's "Big Titles" measure combines majors, the ATP Finals, Masters 1000 tournaments and Olympic singles gold medals. Djokovic and Nadal won one of these titles per 3.3 and 3.5 appearances respectively, while Federer's rate was one per 4.4 appearances. Both Nadal and Djokovic have won Olympic singles gold medals, while Federer has won singles silver and partnered Stan Wawrinka to win gold in doubles.

=== Opposition and interruptions ===
Players outside the Big Three won 15 of the 81 majors held from the 2003 Wimbledon Championships through the 2023 US Open. Murray and Wawrinka won three each, while Alcaraz won two. The seven one-time champions were Andy Roddick, Gaston Gaudio, Marat Safin, Juan Martin del Potro, Marin Cilic, Dominic Thiem and Daniil Medvedev. Murray's record also included the world No. 1 ranking, 14 Masters titles and two Olympic singles gold medals.

At Masters 1000 level, six players won their first title during the 78-event period of Big Four dominance from the 2008 Madrid Open through the 2017 Madrid Open. Nine players then won their first Masters title in the following 21 tournaments, from the 2017 Italian Open through the 2019 Cincinnati Open.

== Rivalries and competitive dynamics ==
=== Federer–Nadal ===
Federer and Nadal first played at the 2004 Miami Open, where the 17-year-old Nadal defeated the world No. 1 in straight sets. They played 40 tour-level matches, with Nadal leading their match record 24–16. Nadal led their head to head on clay (14–2), while Federer held the advantage on grass (3–1) and hard courts (11–9). Nadal won 10 of their 14 meetings at major championships, including six of their nine finals, with Federer’s victories coming at Wimbledon in 2006 and 2007 and the Australian Open in 2017.

Federer recovered from two sets down to win their second meeting, in the 2005 Miami final, after which Nadal won five consecutive matches to take a 6–1 lead in the series. Federer defeated Nadal at Wimbledon and the ATP Finals in 2006; in 2007, he again won their meetings at those events and recorded his first clay-court victory over Nadal in the Hamburg final. Nadal won all four of their matches in 2008, including the French Open and Wimbledon finals, and defeated Federer in a five-set Australian Open final the following year. Nadal's heavy topspin forehand produced a high bounce to Federer's one-handed backhand, a pattern that contributed to Nadal's success against him on clay.

Federer won six of their final seven matches, including the 2017 Australian Open final and their last meeting, in the 2019 Wimbledon semi-finals. Nadal's only victory during those seven matches came in the 2019 French Open semi-finals, taking his record against Federer at that tournament to 6–0.

=== Djokovic–Nadal ===
Djokovic and Nadal first met in the quarter-finals of the 2006 French Open, where Djokovic retired after losing the first two sets. Their 60 tour-level meetings are the most between two men in the Open Era; Djokovic won their final match at the 2024 Olympic tournament and finished with a 31–29 lead. They contested nine major finals, including at least one at each of the four majors, with Nadal winning five and Djokovic four.

Nadal led the rivalry 15–7 through the end of 2010, but Djokovic then defeated him in seven consecutive finals from Indian Wells in 2011 through the 2012 Australian Open. The sequence covered hard courts, clay and grass and included the 2011 Wimbledon and US Open finals and the 2012 Australian Open final. Their Australian Open final lasted five hours and 53 minutes, the longest major singles final.

Nadal won eight of their 10 matches at the French Open through 2022, while Djokovic became the only player to defeat him twice at the tournament. Their final three French Open meetings were Nadal's straight-sets victory in the 2020 final, Djokovic's four-set victory in the 2021 semi-finals and Nadal's four-set victory in the 2022 quarter-finals.

=== Djokovic–Federer ===
Djokovic and Federer played 50 times between 2006 and 2020, the second-highest total for a men's rivalry in the Open Era, with Djokovic leading 27–23. Federer won 13 of their first 19 matches through 2010, including the 2007 US Open final, Djokovic's first major final. Federer later described the rivalry as having moved from frequent semi-finals, when he and Nadal held the top two rankings, to more finals after Djokovic reached No. 1.

Djokovic won four of their five major finals, taking the Wimbledon titles in 2014, 2015 and 2019 and the 2015 US Open; Federer's only victory came at the 2007 US Open. The 2019 Wimbledon final lasted four hours and 57 minutes, the longest men's singles final in the tournament's history, and Djokovic saved two championship points before winning the deciding-set tie-break. Their major meetings also included consecutive US Open semi-finals in 2010 and 2011 in which Djokovic saved match points before defeating Federer.

Djokovic won six of their final seven matches and led their hard-court series 20–18 after their last meeting, a straight-sets victory in the 2020 Australian Open semi-finals. Federer's only victory during that sequence came at the 2019 ATP Finals, where he won in straight sets and prevented Djokovic from advancing from the round-robin stage.

=== Mutual influence and adaptation ===
Federer later credited Nadal with forcing him to reconsider parts of his game, including the size of his racket head, because of the demands Nadal placed on him on clay. The larger racket Federer adopted in 2014 gave him more power on the backhand and greater confidence to return Nadal's left-handed serve with topspin. By 2019, Nadal was serving with greater force and approaching the net more often, while Federer's larger racket allowed him to drive his backhand more firmly against Nadal's topspin.

Nadal credited Djokovic with pushing him beyond his previous limits during their rivalry and said that the competition had changed the player he became. Djokovic likewise said that repeated losses to Nadal on clay made him improve and taught him what was required to defeat Nadal at the French Open. In the 2021 French Open semi-finals, Djokovic repeatedly directed play into Nadal's forehand corner to keep him from controlling points with that shot.

Federer said that Djokovic adapted to his play over time and strengthened his movement, backhand and forehand as their rivalry developed. Federer also said in 2015 that he and Djokovic generally did not need to alter their games greatly against each other and that their matches often depended on which player executed his own game more effectively.

=== Notable matches ===
In the 2006 Italian Open final, Nadal defeated Federer in five sets after more than five hours, saving two match points before securing the title. Their 2008 Wimbledon final received wider recognition: Nadal won 9–7 in the fifth set after Federer recovered from two sets down, ending Federer's run of five consecutive Wimbledon titles in a match many regarded as the greatest ever played. They met in another five-set major final at the 2017 Australian Open, where Federer returned from a six-month injury absence and recovered from 1–3 down in the deciding set to win his first major since 2012.

Djokovic won the 2012 Australian Open final against Nadal in five hours and 53 minutes, the longest major singles final, after Nadal had led 4–2 in the deciding set. Nadal reversed the result in the 2013 French Open semi-finals, winning 9–7 in the fifth set after four hours and 37 minutes, in a match described as another major encounter in the rivalry and Nadal's toughest victory at the tournament. Djokovic defeated Nadal 10–8 in the fifth set of their 2018 Wimbledon semi-final after five hours and 15 minutes, reaching his first major final since the 2016 US Open during his return from a right-elbow injury. At the 2021 French Open, Djokovic defeated Nadal in four sets after four hours and 22 minutes; Nadal entered the semi-final with a 105–2 record at the tournament, and it has described as one of the biggest wins of Djokovic's career.

Federer defeated Djokovic in four sets in the 2011 French Open semi-finals, ending Djokovic's 41-match winning streak. Their 2019 Wimbledon final lasted four hours and 57 minutes, the longest men's singles final in Wimbledon history, with Djokovic saving two championship points on Federer's serve before winning the first Wimbledon men's singles final decided by a tie-break at 12–12 in the fifth set.

=== Grand Slam tournament title race ===
Federer became the first of the Big Three to hold the men's record for major singles titles when he won his 15th at the 2009 Wimbledon Championships, surpassing Pete Sampras's total of 14. In 2016, Federer led Nadal and Djokovic 17–14–12; by the end of 2018, the totals stood at 20–17–14. Nadal drew level with Federer on 20 by winning the 2020 French Open. Djokovic then won the 2021 Wimbledon Championships for his 20th major, leaving all three level on 20 titles.

Nadal took the outright men's lead for the first time by winning his 21st major at the 2022 Australian Open, then extended it to 22 at the French Open, while Djokovic won Wimbledon for his 21st. Djokovic equalled Nadal on 22 at the 2023 Australian Open and moved ahead by winning his 23rd at the French Open. His victory at the 2023 US Open raised the record to 24.

== Analysis of the dominance ==
=== Contrasting playing styles ===
Federer used an attacking game marked by varied shot selection and fluid movement. Nadal relied on a heavy-topspin forehand and athleticism; during his breakthrough season in 2005, he won 45% of return points, the highest rate of his career. Djokovic combined offensive and defensive skills with a powerful backhand, a precise return of serve, elasticity and endurance.

Nadal's serve improved during his career. In 2010, when he won majors on clay, grass and hard courts, he saved a career-high 71% of break points and recorded his fewest double faults in a completed season; in 2019, he set a career high for points won behind his first serve. Djokovic's movement depended on anticipation as well as speed and flexibility, allowing him to read an opponent's attack and return the ball with depth. Federer argued in 2017 that younger players faced the added difficulty of defeating several champions with different styles during the same major or Masters 1000 tournament.

=== Physical preparation and longevity ===
Improved sports science, conditioning and injury-prevention programmes extended the ages at which professional players could remain competitive. Longer careers in elite sport were also associated with improvements in diet, recovery, mental wellbeing and training facilities, with the Big Three cited among athletes who remained dominant into ages once regarded as late in a career. ATP rules allowed long-serving players to reduce their mandatory tournament commitments without a ranking penalty.

Federer sought to eat healthily and made sleep a priority, particularly after demanding matches. He managed his schedule more selectively after returning from knee surgery in 2017, skipping that year's clay-court season because he considered rest and preparation necessary to prolong his career. Nadal's career was interrupted by recurring injuries and Müller-Weiss disease, a degenerative disorder in his foot, but his final two major titles came in 2022. At the 2019 French Open, Nadal regularly used whole-body cryotherapy as part of his recovery. Evidence at the time supported relief of perceived muscle soreness, but other claimed benefits remained unproven.

Djokovic credited his switch to a gluten-free diet with improving his tennis performance and reported better sleep and more energy after a two-week trial. He also used hyperbaric oxygen chambers as part of his recovery routine. At the 2023 French Open, he wore a TaoPatch that he claimed improved his on-court performance. Forbes, however, reported that studies cited by its manufacturer were limited and funded by the company.

=== Psychological and competitive factors ===
Federer was prone to tantrums and racket smashes as a teenager, but later worked with a psychologist and learned to control those reactions. After reaching No. 1, Federer said that he set himself the further goal of remaining there rather than treating the ranking as the end of his ambition. Nadal approached each point and opponent with similar intensity and placed particular importance on self-control, attitude and continuing to compete when behind. He could become frustrated during practice, but generally remained calm in competition and concentrated on one point at a time.

Djokovic often used hostile crowds as motivation. During the 2019 Wimbledon final, he said that he mentally recast chants for Federer as support for himself while recovering from two championship points down. John McEnroe compared the prospect of a third player challenging Alcaraz and Sinner with Djokovic's rise to the level of Federer and Nadal, which helped create a three-sided rivalry. Djokovic said that he and his team spent years analysing how to defeat Federer and Nadal and that those rivalries helped define him as a player.

=== Conditions of the era ===
In tests reported in 2011, selected polyester strings produced an average of 25% more spin on the ball after impact than selected nylon strings under the same conditions. Physicist Rod Cross cautioned that racket-head speed and swing angle could affect spin more than the choice of string alone.

Federer argued in 2012 that slower courts favoured defensive play, while a greater range of court speeds would encourage more attacking styles and give other players a better chance of challenging the leading players. He later argued that surface speed, ball speed and racket technology had increased the margins available to leading players, making opponents work harder to defeat them and giving the established elite an advantage over best-of-five-set matches. Tournament organisers could alter those conditions. The US Open slowed its hard courts slightly in 2018 after players reported that they had become faster in preceding years.

Grand Slam tournaments expanded from 16 to 32 seeds in 2001, partly in response to clay-court specialists seeking better draw protection at Wimbledon. Federer also argued that the gap in ranking points between winning a major and losing in an earlier round allowed established champions with large point totals to select their schedules, while a younger player gained relatively little from an upset unless it led to a deep tournament run. He nevertheless accepted that majors, Masters 1000 tournaments and the ATP Finals should carry substantial ranking rewards, since the world's best player should be determined by results at the biggest tournaments.

== Impact on men's tennis ==
=== Competitive standards and records ===
Andre Agassi said in 2013 that Federer had raised the standard at the top of men's tennis, Nadal had matched and raised it, and Djokovic had then taken it higher; he added that competing with them would have required changes to both his strategy and physical preparation. Nadal regarded Federer's dominance as the standard he needed to reach, while Djokovic later passed both players in total weeks and year-end finishes at No. 1, major titles and Masters 1000 titles.

Federer became the first man to win 20 major singles titles when he won the 2018 Australian Open. Nadal later reached 22 and Djokovic 24, leaving the three as the only men with at least 20 major titles. Most leading men's champions of the previous 60 years won their final major around age 30 or earlier, whereas Federer, Nadal and Djokovic each won a major at 36.

=== Effect on contemporaries ===
Before Wimbledon in 2013, Pritha Sarkar of Reuters described Tomas Berdych, Jo-Wilfried Tsonga, Juan Martin del Potro and David Ferrer as players with the ability to have won several majors in another era but whose opportunities were restricted by the leading group. Murray won three majors, reached world No. 1 and later said that he might have won more in another era but would not have become as good a player without the competition he faced.

=== Popularity and commercial influence ===
The Federer-Nadal rivalry reignited global interest in tennis. Their 2008 Wimbledon final reached a peak audience of 12.7 million on BBC One, compared with 7.3 million for their five-set final at the same tournament the previous year. Federer, Nadal and Djokovic contested 23 major finals against one another; by comparison, Jimmy Connors, Björn Borg and John McEnroe contested 10 among themselves.

Federer led Forbes's annual ranking of tennis earnings until his retirement in 2022, and Djokovic briefly took first place in 2023. Forbes estimated Federer's 2020 earnings at US$106.3 million and Nadal's at US$40 million; Djokovic exceeded US$20 million in annual on-court earnings, comprising prize money and tour bonuses, in 2016 and 2019.

The concentration of attention on the trio also drew criticism. The Guardian sportswriter Jonathan Liew argued that the media coverage, sponsorship and prime-time television devoted to the Big Three came at the expense of other men's players and women's tennis; Nick Kyrgios similarly said in 2022 that men's tennis had largely marketed three players for a decade.

=== Generational consequences ===
In 2017, Federer said that the generation following his and Nadal's had not been strong enough to displace the established champions and faced the difficulty of defeating several leading players with different styles during one tournament. By 2023, the generation headed by Daniil Medvedev, Alexander Zverev and Stefanos Tsitsipas had failed to displace the Big Three, who held winning head-to-head records against the prominent players expected to succeed them, apart from Federer's one-match deficits against Zverev and Andrey Rublev. At the end of the 2024 US Open, Dominic Thiem and Medvedev remained the only men's major champions born in the 1990s.

The early major records of Carlos Alcaraz and Jannik Sinner were compared directly with those of the Big Three, including the number of matches and their ages when they reached 50 major match wins. Alcaraz, Sinner and Holger Rune were also proposed as a possible new Big Three in 2023, although none had yet established the original trio's longevity.

Sinner's defeat of Djokovic in the 2024 Australian Open semi-finals produced the first men's final at the tournament since 2005 without Federer, Nadal or Djokovic; Sinner and Alcaraz then divided the four major titles that season. In January 2026, Federer said that the Sinner-Alcaraz rivalry had brought fresh energy to men's tennis; the pair had won nine of the preceding 10 majors.

== Reception and legacy ==
=== Golden-era assessments ===
The period dominated by Federer, Nadal and Djokovic has often been described as a golden era of men's tennis. Federer called the period he shared with Nadal, Djokovic and Murray an unprecedented golden era and said at his retirement in 2022 that he had come to value rivalries he had not wanted. After winning his 23rd major in 2023, Djokovic likewise said that he, Federer, Nadal and Murray had reached a golden era.

Federer, Nadal and Djokovic contested 23 major finals against one another, compared with 10 among Jimmy Connors, Björn Borg and John McEnroe. An ATP retrospective called their period the finest era in men's tennis and described their matches as contests between contrasting styles, personalities and fan bases. The same retrospective described the three as ambassadors who raised tennis's international profile over two decades.

=== Debate over 'golden era' label ===
Writing for Tennis.com, Joel Drucker objected to describing the Big Three years as a "Golden Era" because he felt the term undervalued the great players who came before them and encouraged the assumption that tennis might no longer be enjoyable once the trio were gone. He recalled similar concerns as the era of Australian dominance neared its end in the early 1970s, and again a decade later when questions about tennis's future surfaced around Borg, Connors and McEnroe.

The Guardian tennis writer Tim Joyce noted that the 1970s and early 1980s marked a peak in tennis's popularity in the United States, and that fans who grew up in that period later lamented that the sport was no longer the same and that subsequent rivalries could not compare with those of Connors, Borg and McEnroe.

Also writing for Tennis.com, Peter Bodo argued in 2013 that men's tennis had become predictable amid Big Four dominance, and that slower surfaces encouraged a template built around strong defense and aggressive baseline play, which limited the stylistic variety found under more varied surface conditions. Drucker later questioned whether the Big Three had altered fans' expectations of a satisfying tennis-viewing experience, arguing that the coming era could offer rich stylistic diversity even without comparable levels of dominance.

=== Greatest-of-all-time debate ===
The three players' overlapping careers produced a continuing debate over the greatest men's player of all time, commonly abbreviated as GOAT. Federer became the first man to win 20 major singles titles, but Nadal later reached 22 and Djokovic 24. Djokovic also finished ahead of both rivals in total weeks and year-end finishes at world No. 1 and in Masters 1000 titles. Peter Bodo argued that comparisons between the Big Three and earlier champions should account for the increasing similarity of Grand Slam tournament surfaces. Tennis analyst Paul Annacone likewise said that the Big Four had to make fewer adjustments between surfaces and playing styles than players in earlier eras.

Shrivathsa Sridhar wrote after Djokovic's 23rd major in 2023 that a judgment based on statistics alone would favour him. Djokovic declined to call himself the greatest, saying that doing so would be disrespectful to champions from other generations and that each had left a distinct mark on the sport. Tennis writers Joel Drucker and Steve Tignor disagreed over the usefulness of the GOAT debate, although both rejected the idea that cross-era comparisons could yield an objective answer. Drucker stressed the changing metrics of achievement and the exclusion of professionals such as Pancho Gonzales from major championships.

Many continued to regard Federer as the greatest despite Nadal and Djokovic having surpassed his total of major singles titles. Former players Mats Wilander, Andre Agassi and Richard Krajicek each called Djokovic the best tennis player of all time. While distinguishing the "best" from "greatest," Wilander nevertheless said he could not separate the Big Three when judging greatness based on what they brought to the sport, while Krajicek clearly declared Federer as the greatest for his influence on tennis and its popularity. Former world No. 1 Ilie Năstase regarded Nadal as the best player he had seen, giving particular weight to his record 14 French Open titles. Martyn Herman described Nadal's status as the "King of Clay" as undisputed, pointing to his 112 victories in 116 matches at the French Open.

=== Relationships and public image ===
The Federer-Nadal rivalry developed into a close friendship during their careers. Nadal partnered Federer in the final match of Federer's career at the 2022 Laver Cup, and images of the two crying together afterwards went viral on social media. Federer later called sharing the match and its aftermath with Nadal one of the most special moments of his career.

Djokovic said in 2023 that he and the other two were not friends while they remained direct rivals because close personal confidence was difficult within competition, but that he respected both and hoped they could reflect together after their careers. Nadal said in 2025 that the four leading rivals had experienced good and bad periods and varying degrees of tension but understood that intense competition did not require hatred and could coexist with admiration and respect. Federer likewise said in 2022 that heated moments with Djokovic and Murray had developed into good personal relations by the end of his career.

Djokovic often played before crowds supporting his opponent, and hostile audiences became a recurring feature of his matches. Sports writer Nick Mulvenney noted that he had rarely been the most popular player at the Australian Open despite his record there and described his public role as changing from the self-styled "Djoker" of his twenties to a senior representative of the sport. Public-relations consultant Mark Borkowski contrasted the affection shown to Federer and Nadal with Djokovic's less enthusiastic public reception, attributing the difference partly to Djokovic's later rise to the top, clashes with spectators, his 2020 US Open disqualification and his refusal of COVID-19 vaccination.

== Career statistics ==
=== Overall performances ===
Current through the 2026 US Open (tennis).

- The match win% includes matches of ITF team competitions: Olympics, Davis Cup, Hopman Cup and ATP team competitions: Laver Cup, ATP Cup, United Cup

| Player | Singles | | | Doubles and Mixed Doubles | | | Total | | |
| Player | Titles | Finals | Match Win % | Titles | Finals | Match Win % | Titles | Finals | Match Win % |
|---|---|---|---|---|---|---|---|---|---|
| (Switzerland) Roger Federer | 103 | 157 | 81% (1316–312) | 8 | 14 | 61% (178–113) | 111 | 171 | 78% (1494–425) |
| (Spain) Rafael Nadal | 92 | 131 | 82% (1180–264) | 11 | 15 | 64% (154–86) | 103 | 146 | 79% (1334–350) |
| (Serbia) Novak Djokovic | 101 | 145 | 83% (1292–267) | 1 | 3 | 47% (89–102) | 102 | 148 | 79% (1381–369) |
| Total | 296 | 433 | 82% (3788–843) | 20 | 32 | 58% (421–301) | 316 | 465 | 79% (4209–1144) |

=== Overall significant record comparison ===
- The most versus all other professional players are in bold, except head-to-heads.

| Singles record | (Serbia) Djokovic | (Spain) Nadal | (Switzerland) Federer |
|---|---|---|---|
| Grand Slam tournaments | **24 (4/4)^{x3}** | 22 (4/4)^{x2} | 20 (4/4) |
| ATP Masters 1000 | **40 (9/9)^{x2}** | 36 (7/9) | 28 (7/9) |
| ATP Finals | **7** | 0 | 6 |
| Olympics | 2 | 1 | 1 |
| Weeks as No. 1 | **428** | 209 | 310 |
| Year-end No. 1 | **8** | 5 | 5 |
| Big Titles | **72** | 59 | 54 |
| Career titles | 102 | 92 | 103 |
| Top 10 wins | **269** | 186 | 224 |
| Head to Head | **27–23 (F), 31–29 (N)** | 29–31 (D), **24–16 (F)** | 23–27 (D), 16–24 (N) |

=== Grand Slam events ===
Key
| **W** | F | SF | QF | #R | RR | Q# | DNQ | A | NH |

(W) winner; (F) finalist; (SF) semifinalist; (QF) quarterfinalist; (#R) rounds 4, 3, 2, 1; (RR) round-robin stage; (Q#) qualification round; (DNQ) did not qualify; (A) absent; (NH) not held; (SR) strike rate (events won / competed); (W–L) win–loss record.
To avoid confusion and double counting, these charts are updated at the conclusion of a tournament or when the player's participation has ended.

==== Combined performance timeline (best result) ====
- Since the year of first Grand Slam win.

| Grand Slam | 2003 | 2004 | 2005 | 2006 | 2007 | 2008 | 2009 | 2010 | 2011 | 2012 | 2013 | 2014 | 2015 | 2016 | 2017 | 2018 | 2019 | 2020 | 2021 | 2022 | 2023 | 2024 | 2025 | 2026 | SR |
|---|---|---|---|---|---|---|---|---|---|---|---|---|---|---|---|---|---|---|---|---|---|---|---|---|---|
| Australian Open | 4R^{F} | **W****^{F}** | SF^{F} | **W****^{F}** | **W****^{F}** | **W****^{D}** | **W****^{N}** | **W****^{F}** | **W****^{D}** | **W****^{D}** | **W****^{D}** | F^{N} | **W****^{D}** | **W****^{D}** | **W****^{F}** | **W****^{F}** | **W****^{D}** | **W****^{D}** | **W****^{D}** | **W****^{N}** | **W****^{D}** | SF^{D} | SF^{D} | F^{D} | 18/24 |
| French Open | 1R^{F} | 3R^{F} | **W****^{N}** | **W****^{N}** | **W****^{N}** | **W****^{N}** | **W****^{F}** | **W****^{N}** | **W****^{N}** | **W****^{N}** | **W****^{N}** | **W****^{N}** | F^{D} | **W****^{D}** | **W****^{N}** | **W****^{N}** | **W****^{N}** | **W****^{N}** | **W****^{D}** | **W****^{N}** | **W****^{D}** | QF^{D} | SF^{D} | 3R^{D} | 18/24 |
| Wimbledon | **W****^{F}** | **W****^{F}** | **W****^{F}** | **W****^{F}** | **W****^{F}** | **W****^{N}** | **W****^{F}** | **W****^{N}** | **W****^{D}** | **W****^{F}** | F^{D} | **W****^{D}** | **W****^{D}** | SF^{F} | **W****^{F}** | **W****^{D}** | **W****^{D}** | NH (Note: Not held due to the COVID-19 pandemic.) | **W****^{D}** | **W****^{D}** | F^{D} | F^{D} | SF^{D} | SF^{D} | 17/23 |
| US Open | 4R^{F} | **W****^{F}** | **W****^{F}** | **W****^{F}** | **W****^{F}** | **W****^{F}** | F^{F} | **W****^{N}** | **W****^{D}** | F^{D} | **W****^{N}** | SF^{DF} | **W****^{D}** | F^{D} | **W****^{N}** | **W****^{D}** | **W****^{N}** | ~~4R~~^{D} (Note: Djokovic was defaulted and therefore stripped of all ranking points and prize money.) | F^{D} | 4R^{N} | **W****^{D}** | 3R^{D} | SF^{D} | 1R^{D} | 13/24 |

==== Grand Slam tournament winners ====
| Year | Australian Open | French Open | Wimbledon | US Open |
|---|---|---|---|---|
| 2003 | (United States) Andre Agassi | (Spain) Juan Carlos Ferrero | (Switzerland) Roger Federer | (United States) Andy Roddick |
| 2004 | (Switzerland) Roger Federer | (Argentina) Gastón Gaudio | (Switzerland) Roger Federer | (Switzerland) Roger Federer |
| 2005 | (Russia) Marat Safin | (Spain) Rafael Nadal | (Switzerland) Roger Federer | (Switzerland) Roger Federer |
| 2006 | (Switzerland) Roger Federer | (Spain) Rafael Nadal | (Switzerland) Roger Federer | (Switzerland) Roger Federer |
| 2007 | (Switzerland) Roger Federer | (Spain) Rafael Nadal | (Switzerland) Roger Federer | (Switzerland) Roger Federer |
| 2008 | (Serbia) Novak Djokovic | (Spain) Rafael Nadal | (Spain) Rafael Nadal | (Switzerland) Roger Federer |
| 2009 | (Spain) Rafael Nadal | (Switzerland) Roger Federer | (Switzerland) Roger Federer | (Argentina) Juan Martín del Potro |
| 2010 | (Switzerland) Roger Federer | (Spain) Rafael Nadal | (Spain) Rafael Nadal | (Spain) Rafael Nadal |
| 2011 | (Serbia) Novak Djokovic | (Spain) Rafael Nadal | (Serbia) Novak Djokovic | (Serbia) Novak Djokovic |
| 2012 | (Serbia) Novak Djokovic | (Spain) Rafael Nadal | (Switzerland) Roger Federer | (United Kingdom) Andy Murray |
| 2013 | (Serbia) Novak Djokovic | (Spain) Rafael Nadal | (United Kingdom) Andy Murray | (Spain) Rafael Nadal |
| 2014 | (Switzerland) Stan Wawrinka | (Spain) Rafael Nadal | (Serbia) Novak Djokovic | (Croatia) Marin Čilić |
| 2015 | (Serbia) Novak Djokovic | (Switzerland) Stan Wawrinka | (Serbia) Novak Djokovic | (Serbia) Novak Djokovic |
| 2016 | (Serbia) Novak Djokovic | (Serbia) Novak Djokovic | (United Kingdom) Andy Murray | (Switzerland) Stan Wawrinka |
| 2017 | (Switzerland) Roger Federer | (Spain) Rafael Nadal | (Switzerland) Roger Federer | (Spain) Rafael Nadal |
| 2018 | (Switzerland) Roger Federer | (Spain) Rafael Nadal | (Serbia) Novak Djokovic | (Serbia) Novak Djokovic |
| 2019 | (Serbia) Novak Djokovic | (Spain) Rafael Nadal | (Serbia) Novak Djokovic | (Spain) Rafael Nadal |
| 2020 | (Serbia) Novak Djokovic | (Spain) Rafael Nadal | Tournament cancelled* | (Austria) Dominic Thiem |
| 2021 | (Serbia) Novak Djokovic | (Serbia) Novak Djokovic | (Serbia) Novak Djokovic | (Russia) Daniil Medvedev |
| 2022 | (Spain) Rafael Nadal | (Spain) Rafael Nadal | (Serbia) Novak Djokovic | (Spain) Carlos Alcaraz |
| 2023 | (Serbia) Novak Djokovic | (Serbia) Novak Djokovic | (Spain) Carlos Alcaraz | (Serbia) Novak Djokovic |
| 2024 | (Italy) Jannik Sinner | (Spain) Carlos Alcaraz | (Spain) Carlos Alcaraz | (Italy) Jannik Sinner |
| 2025 | (Italy) Jannik Sinner | (Spain) Carlos Alcaraz | (Italy) Jannik Sinner | (Spain) Carlos Alcaraz |
| 2026 | (Spain) Carlos Alcaraz | (Germany) Alexander Zverev | (Italy) Jannik Sinner | (Germany) Alexander Zverev |

* Due to the COVID-19 pandemic, the 2020 Wimbledon was cancelled.

=== ATP Masters 1000 events ===
==== Combined ATP Masters 1000 performance timeline (best result) ====
- Since the year of first ATP Masters 1000 win.

| ATP Masters 1000 | 2002 | 2003 | 2004 | 2005 | 2006 | 2007 | 2008 | 2009 | 2010 | 2011 | 2012 | 2013 | 2014 | 2015 | 2016 | 2017 | 2018 | 2019 | 2020 | 2021 | 2022 | 2023 | 2024 | 2025 | 2026 | SR |
|---|---|---|---|---|---|---|---|---|---|---|---|---|---|---|---|---|---|---|---|---|---|---|---|---|---|---|
| Indian Wells Open | 3R^{F} | 2R^{F} | **W****^{F}** | **W****^{F}** | **W****^{F}** | **W****^{N}** | **W****^{D}** | **W****^{N}** | SF^{N} | **W****^{D}** | **W****^{F}** | **W****^{N}** | **W****^{D}** | **W****^{D}** | **W****^{D}** | **W****^{F}** | F^{F} | F^{F} | NH | A | F^{N} | A | 3R^{D} | 2R^{D} | 4R^{D} | 13/22 |
| Miami Open | F^{F} | QF^{F} | 4R^{N} | **W****^{F}** | **W****^{F}** | **W****^{D}** | F^{N} | F^{D} | SF^{N} | **W****^{D}** | **W****^{D}** | 4R^{D} | **W****^{D}** | **W****^{D}** | **W****^{D}** | **W****^{F}** | 2R^{DF} | **W****^{F}** | NH | A | A | A | A | F^{D} | A | 10/19 |
| Monte Carlo Masters | 2R^{F} | 3R^{N} | A | **W****^{N}** | **W****^{N}** | **W****^{N}** | **W****^{N}** | **W****^{N}** | **W****^{N}** | **W****^{N}** | **W****^{N}** | **W****^{D}** | F^{F} | **W****^{D}** | **W****^{N}** | **W****^{N}** | **W****^{N}** | SF^{N} | NH | QF^{N} | 2R^{D} | 3R^{D} | SF^{D} | 2R^{D} | A | 13/22 |
| Madrid Open (Note: Held as Hamburg Open until 2008, and Madrid Open 2009–present.) | **W****^{F}** | 3R^{FN} | **W****^{F}** | **W****^{F}** | 2R^{D} | **W****^{F}** | **W****^{N}** | **W****^{F}** | **W****^{N}** | **W****^{D}** | **W****^{F}** | **W****^{N}** | **W****^{N}** | F^{N} | **W****^{D}** | **W****^{N}** | QF^{N} | **W****^{D}** | NH | QF^{N} | SF^{D} | A | 4R^{N} | 2R^{D} | A | 14/22 |
| Italian Open | 1R^{F} | F^{F} | 2R^{F} | **W****^{N}** | **W****^{N}** | **W****^{N}** | **W****^{D}** | **W****^{N}** | **W****^{N}** | **W****^{D}** | **W****^{N}** | **W****^{N}** | **W****^{D}** | **W****^{D}** | F^{D} | F^{D} | **W****^{N}** | **W****^{N}** | **W****^{D}** | **W****^{N}** | **W****^{D}** | QF^{D} | 3R^{D} | A | 2R^{D} | 16/24 |
| Canadian Open | 1R^{F} | SF^{F} | **W****^{F}** | **W****^{N}** | **W****^{F}** | **W****^{D}** | **W****^{N}** | QF^{DFN} | F^{F} | **W****^{D}** | **W****^{D}** | **W****^{N}** | F^{F} | F^{D} | **W****^{D}** | F^{F} | **W****^{N}** | **W****^{N}** | NH | A | A | A | A | A | A | 11/18 |
| Cincinnati Open | 1R^{F} | 2R^{F} | 1R^{FN} | **W****^{F}** | QF^{N} | **W****^{F}** | F^{D} | **W****^{F}** | **W****^{F}** | F^{D} | **W****^{F}** | **W****^{N}** | **W****^{F}** | **W****^{F}** | 3R^{N} | QF^{N} | **W****^{D}** | SF^{D} | **W****^{D}** | A | 2R^{N} | **W****^{D}** | A | A | 2R^{D} | 11/22 |
| Shanghai Masters (Note: Held as Madrid Open from 2002 to 2008, and Shanghai Masters 2009–present.) | QF^{F} | SF^{F} | 2R^{N} | **W****^{N}** | **W****^{F}** | F^{F} | SF^{FN} | F^{N} | F^{F} | 3R^{N} | **W****^{D}** | **W****^{D}** | **W****^{F}** | **W****^{D}** | SF^{D} | **W****^{F}** | **W****^{D}** | QF^{DF} | NH | | | A | F^{D} | SF^{D} | 2R^{D} | 8/20 |
| Paris Masters | QF^{F} | QF^{F} | A | 3R^{D} | 2R^{D} | F^{N} | QF^{FN} | **W****^{D}** | SF^{F} | **W****^{F}** | 2R^{D} | **W****^{D}** | **W****^{D}** | **W****^{D}** | QF^{D} | QF^{N} | F^{D} | **W****^{D}** | SF^{N} | **W****^{D}** | F^{D} | **W****^{D}** | A | A | 2R^{D} | 8/22 |

==== Combined ATP Finals performance timeline (best result) ====
- Since the year of first ATP Finals qualification.

| ATP Finals | 2002 | 2003 | 2004 | 2005 | 2006 | 2007 | 2008 | 2009 | 2010 | 2011 | 2012 | 2013 | 2014 | 2015 | 2016 | 2017 | 2018 | 2019 | 2020 | 2021 | 2022 | 2023 | 2024 | 2025 | 2026 | SR |
|---|---|---|---|---|---|---|---|---|---|---|---|---|---|---|---|---|---|---|---|---|---|---|---|---|---|---|
| ATP Finals | SF^{F} | **W**^{F} | **W**^{F} | F^{F} | **W**^{F} | **W**^{F} | **W**^{D} | SF^{F} | **W**^{F} | **W**^{F} | **W**^{D} | **W**^{D} | **W**^{D} | **W**^{D} | F^{D} | SF^{F} | F^{D} | SF^{F} | SF^{DN} | SF^{D} | **W**^{D} | **W**^{D} | A | A | A | 13/22 |

=== Big Titles ===
Current through the 2026 US Open.

| Titles | Player | **Grand Slams** | | | | ATP Finals | **ATP Masters** | | | | | | | | | Olympics (Note: The Olympics gold medal entered the Big Titles list in 2019.) | Career Grand Slam | Career Super Slam | Career Golden Slam | Golden Masters | W–L (%) |
| Titles | Player | AO | RG | WIM | USO | ATP Finals | IW | MIA | MON | MAD | ROM | CAN | CIN | SHA | PAR | Olympics | Career Grand Slam | Career Super Slam | Career Golden Slam | Golden Masters | W–L (%) |
| **72** | (Serbia) Novak Djokovic | **W** (10) | **W** (3) | **W** (7) | **W** (4) | **W** (7) | **W** (5) | **W** (6) | **W** (2) | **W** (3) | **W** (6) | **W** (4) | **W** (3) | **W** (4) | **W** (7) | Tennis at the 2024 Summer Olympics – Men's singles Tennis at the 2008 Summer Olympics – Men's singles | 2016, 2021, 2023 | 2024 | 2024 | 2018, 2020 | 898–181 (83.2%) |
| **59** | (Spain) Rafael Nadal | **W** (2) | **W** (14) | **W** (2) | **W** (4) | F (2) | **W** (3) | F (5) | **W** (11) | **W** (5) | **W** (10) | **W** (5) | **W** (1) | **W** (1) | F (1) | Tennis at the 2008 Summer Olympics – Men's singles | 2010, 2022 | × | 2010 | × | 756–155 (83%) |
| **54** | (Switzerland) Roger Federer | **W** (6) | **W** (1) | **W** (8) | **W** (5) | **W** (6) | **W** (5) | **W** (4) | F (4) | **W** (6)^{§} | F (4) | **W** (2) | **W** (7) | **W** (3)^{§} | **W** (1) | Tennis at the 2012 Summer Olympics – Men's singles | 2009 | × | × | × | 822–190 (81.2%) |
| 185 | Total | 66 | | | | 13 | 104 | | | | | | | | | 2 | 6 | 1 | 2 | 2 | 2476–526 (82.5%) |

Other feats: Djokovic achieved a Non-calendar Grand Slam. Nadal and Djokovic both achieved a Surface Slam. Nadal, Djokovic and Federer achieved a Channel Slam and a Three-Quarter Slam.

Outright active tournament record underlined (§ = title(s) in different tournament(s)).

=== ATP Rankings ===
Ranking history for the Big Four 1999–2021

==== Combined rankings timeline (best result) ====
- Since the first year-end No. 1 finish.

| ATP rankings | 2004 | 2005 | 2006 | 2007 | 2008 | 2009 | 2010 | 2011 | 2012 | 2013 | 2014 | 2015 | 2016 | 2017 | 2018 | 2019 | 2020 | 2021 | 2022 | 2023 | 2024 | 2025 | 2026 | Total |
|---|---|---|---|---|---|---|---|---|---|---|---|---|---|---|---|---|---|---|---|---|---|---|---|---|
| ATP rankings | 1^{F} | 1^{F} | 1^{F} | 1^{F} | 1^{N} | 1^{F} | 1^{N} | 1^{D} | 1^{D} | 1^{N} | 1^{D} | 1^{D} | 2^{D} | 1^{N} | 1^{D} | 1^{N} | 1^{D} | 1^{D} | 2^{N} | 1^{D} | 7^{D} | 4^{D} | | Total |
| Weeks at No. 1 | | | | | | | | | | | | | | | 310^{F} | | 209^{N} | | | | 428^{D} | | | 947 |
| Year-ends at No. 1 | | | | | | 5^{F} | | | | | | | | | | 5^{N} | | | | 8^{D} | | | | 18 |

Outright records indicated in bold.

==== Singles rankings achievements ====
| Rankings | Federer | Nadal | Djokovic |
|---|---|---|---|
| Weeks as ATP No. 1 | 310 | 209 | **428** |
| ATP Year-end No. 1 | 5 | 5 | **8** |
| ITF World Champions | 5 | 5 | **8** |
| Consecutive Weeks as ATP No. 1 | **237** | 56 | 122 |
| Consecutive ATP Year-end No. 1 | **4** | 0 | 2 |
| Consecutive wire-to-wire ATP Year-end No. 1 | **3** | 0 | 1 |

- **Bold** indicates outright record.

=== Head-to-head matchups ===
| Player | (Serbia) Djokovic | (Spain) Nadal | (Switzerland) Federer | Win % | Finals win % |
|---|---|---|---|---|---|
| (Serbia) Novak Djokovic | | **31–29** | **27–23** | 58–52 (52.7%) | 28–19 (59.6%) |
| (Spain) Rafael Nadal | 29–31 | | **24–16** | 53–47 (53%) | 27–25 (51.9%) |
| (Switzerland) Roger Federer | 23–27 | 16–24 | | 39–51 (43.3%) | 16–27 (37.2%) |

Despite losing record in matches, Federer had a better head-to-head record against Djokovic in games (758–749) and points (4729–4695) played.

==== Results by court surface ====
Nadal dominated on clay, particularly at the French Open, where he won all six matches against Federer and eight of ten against Djokovic.

| Player | Hard | | | | | Clay | | | | | Grass | | | | |
| Player | Matches | W | L | % | Finals W% | Matches | W | L | % | Finals W% | Matches | W | L | % | Finals W% |
|---|---|---|---|---|---|---|---|---|---|---|---|---|---|---|---|
| (Switzerland) Roger Federer | 58 | 29 | 29 | 50% | 12–11 (52%) | 24 | 6 | 18 | 25% | 2–12 (14%) | **8** | 4 | 4 | 50% | 2–4 (33%) |
| (Spain) Rafael Nadal | 47 | 16 | 31 | 34% | 5–16 (24%) | **45** | 34 | 11 | **76%** | 20–6 (77%) | **8** | 3 | 5 | 38% | 2–3 (40%) |
| (Serbia) Novak Djokovic | **65** | **40** | **25** | **62%** | 19–9 (68%) | 37 | 13 | 24 | 35% | 5–9 (36%) | **8** | 5 | 3 | **63%** | 4–1 (80%) |
| Total | 85 | | | | 36 | 53 | | | | 27 | 12 | | | | 8 |

Two walkovers (2014 ATP Finals finals and 2019 Indian Wells semifinals) are not included in that table.

==== Results by tournament level ====
| Player | All tournaments | | | | | Grand Slams | | | | | ATP 1000s | | | | | ATP Finals | | | | |
| Player | Matches | W | L | % | Finals W% | Matches | W | L | % | Finals W% | Matches | W | L | % | Finals W% | Matches | W | L | % | Finals W% |
|---|---|---|---|---|---|---|---|---|---|---|---|---|---|---|---|---|---|---|---|---|
| (Switzerland) Roger Federer | 90 | 39 | 51 | 43% | 16–27 (37%) | 31 | 10 | 21 | 32% | 4–10 (29%) | 39 | 16 | 23 | 41% | 8–12 (40%) | **11** | 7 | 4 | **64%** | 1–2 (33%) |
| (Spain) Rafael Nadal | 100 | 53 | 47 | **53%** | 27–25 (52%) | 32 | 21 | 11 | **66%** | 11–7 (**61%**) | 48 | 25 | 23 | 52% | 14–12 (54%) | 10 | 3 | 7 | 30% | 0–2 (0%) |
| (Serbia) Novak Djokovic | **110** | 58 | 52 | 53% | 28–19 (**60%**) | **35** | 18 | 17 | 51% | 8–6 (57%) | **49** | 27 | 22 | **55%** | 12–10 (**55%**) | **11** | 6 | 5 | 55% | 3–0 (**100%**) |
| Total | 150 | | | | 71 | 49 | | | | 23 | 68 | | | | 34 | 16 | | | | 4 |

- Outright records compared to all other players and winning head to head records are indicated in **bold**.

=== National and international representation ===
ITF team competitions: Olympics, Davis Cup, Hopman Cup and ATP team competitions: Laver Cup, ATP Cup, United Cup

Current as of 2024 Davis Cup

- The United Cup, a mixed-gender team event from 2023, directly replaced now defunct ATP Cup (2020–2022).
- A player being considered as a part of Davis Cup winning team, if he is nominated for the Finals.

==== Overall matches statistics comparison ====
| Player | Olympics | Davis Cup | Hopman Cup | Laver Cup | ATP Cup | United Cup | Overall | Win % | Years | Titles |
|---|---|---|---|---|---|---|---|---|---|---|
| (Switzerland) Federer | 20–7 | 52–18 | 27–9 | 8–4 | – | – | 107–38 | 73.8% | 1999–2022 | 8 |
| (Spain) Nadal | 19–6 | 37–6 | – | 3–4 | 6–2 | 0–2 | 65–20 | 76.5% | 2004–2024 | 8 |
| (Serbia) Djokovic | 22–10 | 46–16 | 20–8 | 2–3 | 11–1 | 3–1 | 104–39 | 72.7% | 2004–2024 | 4 |

==== Performance comparison by events representation ====
| Player | Olympics | | | | Davis Cup | | | | | Hopman Cup | | | | Laver Cup | | | | ATP Cup/United Cup | | | |
| Player | Events | Medals | Match wins | Win % | Nominations | Ties | Titles | Match wins | Win % | Events | Titles | Match wins | Win % | Events | Titles | Match wins | Win % | Events | Titles | Match wins | Win % |
|---|---|---|---|---|---|---|---|---|---|---|---|---|---|---|---|---|---|---|---|---|---|
| (Switzerland) Roger Federer | 7 | 2 | 20 | 74% (20–7) | 27 | 27 | 1 | **52** | 74% (52–18) | **5** | **3** | **27** | **75%** (27–9) | **4** | **3** | **8** | **67%** (8–4) | not participated | | | |
| (Spain) Rafael Nadal | 7 | 2 | 19 | **76%** (19–6) | 21 | 24 | **4** | 37 | **86%** (37–6) | not participated | | | | 3 | 2 | 3 | 43% (3–4) | **3** | 0 | 6 | 67% (6–3) |
| (Serbia) Novak Djokovic | **8** | 2 | **22** | 69% (22–10) | **30** | **37** | 1 | 46 | 74% (46–16) | 4 | 0 | 20 | 71% (20–8) | 2 | 1 | 2 | 40% (2–3) | **3** | **1** | **14** | **88%** (14–2) |

==== Overall performance comparison by events ====
| Tournament | Federer | Nadal | Djokovic |
|---|---|---|---|
| Olympic Medals | 2012 Summer Olympics 2008 Summer Olympics | 2008 Summer Olympics 2016 Summer Olympics | 2024 Summer Olympics 2008 Summer Olympics |
| Davis Cup | 1 | 4 | 1 |
| Hopman Cup | **3** | – | 0 |
| Laver Cup | 3 | 2 | 1 |
| ATP Cup | – | 0 | 1 |
| United Cup | – | 0 | 0 |

- **Bold** indicates outright record.

=== Prize money ===
Djokovic, Nadal, and Federer makes up the top three prize money leaders of all time (not adjusted for inflation).

Additionally, they collectively own the 10 biggest single season payouts ranging from $13.06 million to $21.65 million.

Career prize money
| (Serbia) Novak Djokovic | US$197,006,276 |
| (Spain) Rafael Nadal | US$134,946,100 |
| (Switzerland) Roger Federer | US$130,594,339 |

Current as of 9 November 2026.

=== Main tennis and sports awards ===
| Award | | Wins by player | | |
| Awarder | Category | Federer | Nadal | Djokovic |
|---|---|---|---|---|
| Association of Tennis Professionals | Player of the Year | 5 | 5 | **8** |
| Association of Tennis Professionals | Most Improved Player of the Year | 0 | 1 | **2** |
| Association of Tennis Professionals | Comeback Player of the Year | **1** | **1** | **1** |
| Association of Tennis Professionals | Newcomer of the Year | 0 | **1** | 0 |
| Association of Tennis Professionals | Fans' Favorite | **19** | 1 | 0 |
| Association of Tennis Professionals | Stefan Edberg Sportsmanship Award | **13** | 5 | 0 |
| Association of Tennis Professionals | Arthur Ashe Humanitarian Award | **2** | 1 | 1 |
| International Tennis Federation | World Champion | 5 | 5 | **8** |
| International Tennis Federation | Champion of Champions | **1** | 0 | 0 |
| International Tennis Federation | Davis Cup Commitment Award | **1** | **1** | **1** |
| Laureus World Sports Awards | World Sportsman of the Year | **5** | 2 | **5** |
| Laureus World Sports Awards | Breakthrough of the Year | 0 | **1** | 0 |
| Laureus World Sports Awards | Comeback Player of the Year | **1** | **1** | 0 |
| Laureus World Sports Awards | Sporting Icon Award | 0 | **1** | 0 |
| ESPY Awards | Best International Athlete | **1** | **1** | 0 |
| ESPY Awards | Best Male Tennis Player | **9** | 3 | 6 |
| BBC Sports Personality of the Year | Overseas Sports Personality of the Year | **4** | 1 | 1 |
| L'Équipe | International Male Champion of Champions | **4** | **4** | 2 |
| La Gazzetta dello Sport | Worldwide Sportman of the Year | **4** | 0 | 0 |
| Marca | Marca Leyenda | **1** | **1** | **1** |

== See also ==
- Big Four career statistics
- The Four Musketeers
- List of career achievements by Roger Federer
- List of career achievements by Rafael Nadal
- List of career achievements by Novak Djokovic
- All-time tennis records – Men's singles
- Tennis performance timeline comparison (men)
- ATP Tour records
- Tennis male players statistics
