= List of ATP Big Titles singles champions =

In men's tennis, the Grand Slam tournaments, the Masters tournaments, and the year-end championships are considered the top-tier events of the annual ATP Tour calendar, in addition to the quadrennial Olympics. They are collectively known as the 'Big Titles'. (Note: The Olympics have been recognized by the ATP as a (non-annual) Big Title since 2020.) The ATP defined the mandatory events (Slams, Masters and YEC) as follows

They are the biggest tournaments in our sport, where participation is mandatory, entry is reserved for the world's best and success is rewarded with fame and a rich haul of points and prize money.

This article lists the respective singles champions of those events since the inception of the ATP Tour in 1990.

Note: By setting 1990 as the cut-off point, this list excludes many notable champions in top level tournaments from previous years. The Grand Slam tournaments and the year-end championships have been held since 1877 and 1970 respectively. The Olympics was first played in 1896, interrupted after 1924 and later resumed in 1988. High category tournaments equivalent to the Masters Series like the Grand Prix Super Series existed before the ATP Tour was introduced. There were also the professional Majors, the World Championship Series and the amateur Majors (WHCC, WCCC) before the Open Era.

Year	Grand Slam tournaments				Year-end Championship	Olympics	Masters Series (Note: The Masters tournaments are listed in chronological order with few exceptions: 1. Cincinnati and Canada were swapped in 1996.; 2. Rome and Madrid/Hamburg were swapped from 2000 to 2010.; 3. Rome was held in the Shanghai slot in 2020.; 4. Indian Wells was held in the Shanghai slot in 2021.)								
Year	Australian Open	French Open	Wimbledon	US Open	Year-end Championship	Olympics	Indian Wells	Miami	Monte Carlo	Madrid (Note: The fourth Masters event has been held in: Madrid (2009–present). Hamburg (1990–2008).)	Rome	Canada	Cincinnati	Shanghai (Note: The eighth Masters event has had a very turbulent history. It has been held in: Shanghai (2009–present). Madrid (2002–2008). Stuttgart (1996–2001). Essen (1995). Stockholm (1990–1994).)	Paris
1990	(Czechoslovakia) Lendl (1/1)	(Ecuador) Gómez (1/1)	(Sweden) Edberg (2/7)	(United States) Sampras (1/30)	(United States) Agassi (2/27)		(Sweden) Edberg (1/7)	(United States) Agassi (1/27)	(Soviet Union) Chesnokov (1/2)	(Spain) Aguilera (1/1)	(Austria) Muster (1/9)	(United States) Chang (1/7)	(Sweden) Edberg (3/7)	(Germany) Becker (1/9)	(Sweden) Edberg (4/7)
1991	(Germany) Becker (2/9)	(United States) Courier (3/9)	(Germany) Stich (1/4)	(Sweden) Edberg (5/7)	(United States) Sampras (2/30)		(United States) Courier (1/9)	(United States) Courier (2/9)	(Spain) Bruguera (1/4)	(Czechoslovakia) Nováček (1/1)	(Spain) Sánchez (1/1)	(Soviet Union) Chesnokov (2/2)	(France) Forget (1/2)	(Germany) Becker (3/9)	(France) Forget (2/2)
1992	(United States) Courier (4/9)	(United States) Courier (6/9)	(United States) Agassi (3/27)	(Sweden) Edberg (7/7)	(Germany) Becker (5/9)	(Switzerland) Rosset (1/1)	(United States) Chang (2/7)	(United States) Chang (3/7)	(Austria) Muster (2/9)	(Sweden) Edberg (6/7)	(United States) Courier (5/9)	(United States) Agassi (4/27)	(United States) Sampras (3/30)	(Croatia) Ivanišević (1/3)	(Germany) Becker (4/9)
1993	(United States) Courier (7/9)	(Spain) Bruguera (3/4)	(United States) Sampras (5/30)	(United States) Sampras (6/30)	(Germany) Stich (4/4)		(United States) Courier (8/9)	(United States) Sampras (4/30)	(Spain) Bruguera (2/4)	(Germany) Stich (2/4)	(United States) Courier (9/9)	(Sweden) Pernfors (1/1)	(United States) Chang (4/7)	(Germany) Stich (3/4)	(Croatia) Ivanišević (2/3)
1994	(United States) Sampras (7/30)	(Spain) Bruguera (4/4)	(United States) Sampras (11/30)	(United States) Agassi (6/27)	(United States) Sampras (12/30)		(United States) Sampras (8/30)	(United States) Sampras (9/30)	(Ukraine) A. Medvedev (1/4)	(Ukraine) A. Medvedev (2/4)	(United States) Sampras (10/30)	(United States) Agassi (5/27)	(United States) Chang (5/7)	(Germany) Becker (6/9)	(United States) Agassi (7/27)
1995	(United States) Agassi (8/27)	(Austria) Muster (5/9)	(United States) Sampras (14/30)	(United States) Sampras (15/30)	(Germany) Becker (7/9)		(United States) Sampras (13/30)	(United States) Agassi (9/27)	(Austria) Muster (3/9)	(Ukraine) A. Medvedev (3/4)	(Austria) Muster (4/9)	(United States) Agassi (10/27)	(United States) Agassi (11/27)	(Austria) Muster (6/9)	(United States) Sampras (16/30)
1996	(Germany) Becker (8/9)	(Russia) Kafelnikov (1/3)	(Netherlands) Krajicek (1/3)	(United States) Sampras (17/30)	(United States) Sampras (18/30)	(United States) Agassi (13/27)	(United States) Chang (6/7)	(United States) Agassi (12/27)	(Austria) Muster (7/9)	(Spain) Carretero (1/1)	(Austria) Muster (8/9)	(South Africa) Ferreira (1/2)	(United States) Agassi (14/27)	(Germany) Becker (9/9)	(Sweden) Enqvist (1/3)
1997	(United States) Sampras (19/30)	(Brazil) Kuerten (1/9)	(United States) Sampras (20/30)	(Australia) Rafter (1/4)	(United States) Sampras (23/30)		(United States) Chang (7/7)	(Austria) Muster (9/9)	(Chile) Ríos (1/5)	(Ukraine) A. Medvedev (4/4)	(Spain) Corretja (1/3)	(United States) Woodruff (1/1)	(United States) Sampras (21/30)	(Czech Republic) Korda (1/2)	(United States) Sampras (22/30)
1998	(Czech Republic) Korda (2/2)	(Spain) Moyá (2/4)	(United States) Sampras (24/30)	(Australia) Rafter (4/4)	(Spain) Corretja (2/3)		(Chile) Ríos (2/5)	(Chile) Ríos (3/5)	(Spain) Moyá (1/4)	(Spain) Costa (1/2)	(Chile) Ríos (4/5)	(Australia) Rafter (2/4)	(Australia) Rafter (3/4)	(Netherlands) Krajicek (2/3)	(United Kingdom) Rusedski (1/1)
1999	(Russia) Kafelnikov (2/3)	(United States) Agassi (15/27)	(United States) Sampras (25/30)	(United States) Agassi (16/27)	(United States) Sampras (27/30)		(Australia) Philippoussis (1/1)	(Netherlands) Krajicek (3/3)	(Brazil) Kuerten (2/9)	(Chile) Ríos (5/5)	(Brazil) Kuerten (3/9)	(Sweden) Johansson (1/2)	(United States) Sampras (26/30)	(Sweden) Enqvist (2/3)	(United States) Agassi (17/27)
2000	(United States) Agassi (18/27)	(Brazil) Kuerten (5/9)	(United States) Sampras (29/30)	(Russia) Safin (2/7)	(Brazil) Kuerten (6/9)	(Russia) Kafelnikov (3/3)	(Spain) Corretja (3/3)	(United States) Sampras (28/30)	(France) Pioline (1/1)	(Brazil) Kuerten (4/9)	(Sweden) Norman (1/1)	(Russia) Safin (1/7)	(Sweden) Enqvist (3/3)	(South Africa) Ferreira (2/2)	(Russia) Safin (3/7)
2001	(United States) Agassi (19/27)	(Brazil) Kuerten (8/9)	(Croatia) Ivanišević (3/3)	(Australia) Hewitt (1/6)	(Australia) Hewitt (2/6)		(United States) Agassi (20/27)	(United States) Agassi (21/27)	(Brazil) Kuerten (7/9)	(Spain) Portas (1/1)	(Spain) Ferrero (1/5)	(Romania) Pavel (1/1)	(Brazil) Kuerten (9/9)	(Germany) Haas (1/1)	(France) Grosjean (1/1)
2002	(Sweden) Johansson (2/2)	(Spain) Costa (2/2)	(Australia) Hewitt (4/6)	(United States) Sampras (30/30)	(Australia) Hewitt (5/6)		(Australia) Hewitt (3/6)	(United States) Agassi (22/27)	(Spain) Ferrero (2/5)	(Switzerland) Federer (1/54)	(United States) Agassi (23/27)	(Argentina) Cañas (1/1)	(Spain) Moyá (3/4)	(United States) Agassi (24/27)	(Russia) Safin (4/7)
2003	(United States) Agassi (25/27)	(Spain) Ferrero (4/5)	(Switzerland) Federer (2/54)	(United States) Roddick (3/6)	(Switzerland) Federer (3/54)		(Australia) Hewitt (6/6)	(United States) Agassi (26/27)	(Spain) Ferrero (3/5)	(Argentina) Coria (1/2)	(Spain) Mantilla (1/1)	(United States) Roddick (1/6)	(United States) Roddick (2/6)	(Spain) Ferrero (5/5)	(United Kingdom) Henman (1/1)
2004	(Switzerland) Federer (4/54)	(Argentina) Gaudio (1/1)	(Switzerland) Federer (7/54)	(Switzerland) Federer (9/54)	(Switzerland) Federer (10/54)	(Chile) Massú (1/1)	(Switzerland) Federer (5/54)	(United States) Roddick (4/6)	(Argentina) Coria (2/2)	(Switzerland) Federer (6/54)	(Spain) Moyá (4/4)	(Switzerland) Federer (8/54)	(United States) Agassi (27/27)	(Russia) Safin (5/7)	(Russia) Safin (6/7)
2005	(Russia) Safin (7/7)	(Spain) Nadal (3/59)	(Switzerland) Federer (14/54)	(Switzerland) Federer (16/54)	(Argentina) Nalbandian (1/3)		(Switzerland) Federer (11/54)	(Switzerland) Federer (12/54)	(Spain) Nadal (1/59)	(Switzerland) Federer (13/54)	(Spain) Nadal (2/59)	(Spain) Nadal (4/59)	(Switzerland) Federer (15/54)	(Spain) Nadal (5/59)	(Czech Republic) Berdych (1/1)
2006	(Switzerland) Federer (17/54)	(Spain) Nadal (8/59)	(Switzerland) Federer (20/54)	(Switzerland) Federer (22/54)	(Switzerland) Federer (24/54)		(Switzerland) Federer (18/54)	(Switzerland) Federer (19/54)	(Spain) Nadal (6/59)	(Spain) Robredo (1/1)	(Spain) Nadal (7/59)	(Switzerland) Federer (21/54)	(United States) Roddick (5/6)	(Switzerland) Federer (23/54)	(Russia) Davydenko (1/4)
2007	(Switzerland) Federer (25/54)	(Spain) Nadal (12/59)	(Switzerland) Federer (27/54)	(Switzerland) Federer (29/54)	(Switzerland) Federer (30/54)		(Spain) Nadal (9/59)	(Serbia) Djokovic (1/72)	(Spain) Nadal (10/59)	(Switzerland) Federer (26/54)	(Spain) Nadal (11/59)	(Serbia) Djokovic (2/72)	(Switzerland) Federer (28/54)	(Argentina) Nalbandian (2/3)	(Argentina) Nalbandian (3/3)
2008	(Serbia) Djokovic (3/72)	(Spain) Nadal (15/59)	(Spain) Nadal (16/59)	(Switzerland) Federer (31/54)	(Serbia) Djokovic (6/72)	(Spain) Nadal (18/59)	(Serbia) Djokovic (4/72)	(Russia) Davydenko (2/4)	(Spain) Nadal (13/59)	(Spain) Nadal (14/59)	(Serbia) Djokovic (5/72)	(Spain) Nadal (17/59)	(United Kingdom) Murray (1/20)	(United Kingdom) Murray (2/20)	(France) Tsonga (1/2)
2009	(Spain) Nadal (19/59)	(Switzerland) Federer (33/54)	(Switzerland) Federer (34/54)	(Argentina) del Potro (1/2)	(Russia) Davydenko (4/4)		(Spain) Nadal (20/59)	(United Kingdom) Murray (3/20)	(Spain) Nadal (21/59)	(Switzerland) Federer (32/54)	(Spain) Nadal (22/59)	(United Kingdom) Murray (4/20)	(Switzerland) Federer (35/54)	(Russia) Davydenko (3/4)	(Serbia) Djokovic (7/72)
2010	(Switzerland) Federer (36/54)	(Spain) Nadal (26/59)	(Spain) Nadal (27/59)	(Spain) Nadal (28/59)	(Switzerland) Federer (38/54)		(Croatia) Ljubičić (1/1)	(United States) Roddick (6/6)	(Spain) Nadal (23/59)	(Spain) Nadal (25/59)	(Spain) Nadal (24/59)	(United Kingdom) Murray (5/20)	(Switzerland) Federer (37/54)	(United Kingdom) Murray (6/20)	(Sweden) Söderling (1/1)
2011	(Serbia) Djokovic (8/72)	(Spain) Nadal (30/59)	(Serbia) Djokovic (13/72)	(Serbia) Djokovic (15/72)	(Switzerland) Federer (40/54)		(Serbia) Djokovic (9/72)	(Serbia) Djokovic (10/72)	(Spain) Nadal (29/59)	(Serbia) Djokovic (11/72)	(Serbia) Djokovic (12/72)	(Serbia) Djokovic (14/72)	(United Kingdom) Murray (7/20)	(United Kingdom) Murray (8/20)	(Switzerland) Federer (39/54)
2012	(Serbia) Djokovic (16/72)	(Spain) Nadal (33/59)	(Switzerland) Federer (43/54)	(United Kingdom) Murray (10/20)	(Serbia) Djokovic (20/72)	(United Kingdom) Murray (9/20)	(Switzerland) Federer (41/54)	(Serbia) Djokovic (17/72)	(Spain) Nadal (31/59)	(Switzerland) Federer (42/54)	(Spain) Nadal (32/59)	(Serbia) Djokovic (18/72)	(Switzerland) Federer (44/54)	(Serbia) Djokovic (19/72)	(Spain) Ferrer (1/1)
2013	(Serbia) Djokovic (21/72)	(Spain) Nadal (37/59)	(United Kingdom) Murray (12/20)	(Spain) Nadal (40/59)	(Serbia) Djokovic (25/72)		(Spain) Nadal (34/59)	(United Kingdom) Murray (11/20)	(Serbia) Djokovic (22/72)	(Spain) Nadal (35/59)	(Spain) Nadal (36/59)	(Spain) Nadal (38/59)	(Spain) Nadal (39/59)	(Serbia) Djokovic (23/72)	(Serbia) Djokovic (24/72)
2014	(Switzerland) Wawrinka (1/4)	(Spain) Nadal (42/59)	(Serbia) Djokovic (29/72)	(Croatia) Čilić (1/2)	(Serbia) Djokovic (31/72)		(Serbia) Djokovic (26/72)	(Serbia) Djokovic (27/72)	(Switzerland) Wawrinka (2/4)	(Spain) Nadal (41/59)	(Serbia) Djokovic (28/72)	(France) Tsonga (2/2)	(Switzerland) Federer (45/54)	(Switzerland) Federer (46/54)	(Serbia) Djokovic (30/72)
2015	(Serbia) Djokovic (32/72)	(Switzerland) Wawrinka (3/4)	(Serbia) Djokovic (37/72)	(Serbia) Djokovic (38/72)	(Serbia) Djokovic (41/72)		(Serbia) Djokovic (33/72)	(Serbia) Djokovic (34/72)	(Serbia) Djokovic (35/72)	(United Kingdom) Murray (13/20)	(Serbia) Djokovic (36/72)	(United Kingdom) Murray (14/20)	(Switzerland) Federer (47/54)	(Serbia) Djokovic (39/72)	(Serbia) Djokovic (40/72)
2016	(Serbia) Djokovic (42/72)	(Serbia) Djokovic (46/72)	(United Kingdom) Murray (16/20)	(Switzerland) Wawrinka (4/4)	(United Kingdom) Murray (20/20)	(United Kingdom) Murray (17/20)	(Serbia) Djokovic (43/72)	(Serbia) Djokovic (44/72)	(Spain) Nadal (43/59)	(Serbia) Djokovic (45/72)	(United Kingdom) Murray (15/20)	(Serbia) Djokovic (47/72)	(Croatia) Čilić (2/2)	(United Kingdom) Murray (18/20)	(United Kingdom) Murray (19/20)
2017	(Switzerland) Federer (48/54)	(Spain) Nadal (46/59)	(Switzerland) Federer (51/54)	(Spain) Nadal (47/59)	(Bulgaria) Dimitrov (2/2)		(Switzerland) Federer (49/54)	(Switzerland) Federer (50/54)	(Spain) Nadal (44/59)	(Spain) Nadal (45/59)	(Germany) Zverev (1/12)	(Germany) Zverev (2/12)	(Bulgaria) Dimitrov (1/2)	(Switzerland) Federer (52/54)	(United States) Sock (1/1)
2018	(Switzerland) Federer (53/54)	(Spain) Nadal (50/59)	(Serbia) Djokovic (48/72)	(Serbia) Djokovic (50/72)	(Germany) Zverev (4/12)		(Argentina) del Potro (2/2)	(United States) Isner (1/1)	(Spain) Nadal (48/59)	(Germany) Zverev (3/12)	(Spain) Nadal (49/59)	(Spain) Nadal (51/59)	(Serbia) Djokovic (49/72)	(Serbia) Djokovic (51/72)	(Russia) Khachanov (1/1)
2019	(Serbia) Djokovic (52/72)	(Spain) Nadal (53/59)	(Serbia) Djokovic (54/72)	(Spain) Nadal (55/59)	(Greece) Tsitsipas (1/4)		(Austria) Thiem (1/2)	(Switzerland) Federer (54/54)	(Italy) Fognini (1/1)	(Serbia) Djokovic (53/72)	(Spain) Nadal (52/59)	(Spain) Nadal (54/59)	(Russia) D. Medvedev (1/8)	(Russia) D. Medvedev (2/8)	(Serbia) Djokovic (55/72)
2020	(Serbia) Djokovic (56/72)	(Spain) Nadal (56/59) (Note: 2020 French Open was held in September, after the US Open, due to the COVID-19 pandemic.)	not held (Note: not held due to the COVID-19 pandemic.)	(Austria) Thiem (2/2)	(Russia) D. Medvedev (4/8)		not held due to the COVID-19 pandemic.				(Serbia) Djokovic (58/72)	not held	(Serbia) Djokovic (57/72)	not held	(Russia) Medvedev (3/8)
2021	(Serbia) Djokovic (59/72)	(Serbia) Djokovic (60/72)	(Serbia) Djokovic (61/72)	(Russia) Medvedev (6/8)	(Germany) Zverev (8/12)	(Germany) Zverev (6/12)	(United Kingdom) Norrie (1/1)	(Poland) Hurkacz (1/2)	(Greece) Tsitsipas (2/4)	(Germany) Zverev (5/12)	(Spain) Nadal (57/59)	(Russia) D. Medvedev (5/8)	(Germany) Zverev (7/12)	not held	(Serbia) Djokovic (62/72)
2022	(Spain) Nadal (58/59)	(Spain) Nadal (59/59)	(Serbia) Djokovic (64/72)	(Spain) Alcaraz (3/17)	(Serbia) Djokovic (65/72)		(United States) Fritz (1/1)	(Spain) Alcaraz (1/17)	(Greece) Tsitsipas (3/4)	(Spain) Alcaraz (2/17)	(Serbia) Djokovic (63/72)	(Spain) Carreño Busta (1/1)	(Croatia) Ćorić (1/1)	not held	(Denmark) Rune (1/1)
2023	(Serbia) Djokovic (66/72)	(Serbia) Djokovic (67/72)	(Spain) Alcaraz (6/17)	(Serbia) Djokovic (69/72)	(Serbia) Djokovic (71/72)		(Spain) Alcaraz (4/17)	(Note: Competed under no flag due to the Russian invasion of Ukraine.) D. Medvedev (7/8)	Rublev (1/2)	(Spain) Alcaraz (5/17)	D. Medvedev (8/8)	(Italy) Sinner (1/17)	(Serbia) Djokovic (68/72)	(Poland) Hurkacz (2/2)	(Serbia) Djokovic (70/72)
2024	(Italy) Sinner (2/17)	(Spain) Alcaraz (8/17)	(Spain) Alcaraz (9/17)	(Italy) Sinner (5/17)	(Italy) Sinner (7/17)	(Serbia) Djokovic (72/72)	(Spain) Alcaraz (7/17)	(Italy) Sinner (3/17)	(Greece) Tsitsipas (4/4)	Rublev (2/2)	(Germany) Zverev (9/12)	(Australia) Popyrin (1/1)	(Italy) Sinner (4/17)	(Italy) Sinner (6/17)	(Germany) Zverev (10/12)
2025	(Italy) Sinner (8/17)	(Spain) Alcaraz (12/17)	(Italy) Sinner (9/17)	(Spain) Alcaraz (14/17)	(Italy) Sinner (11/17)		(United Kingdom) Draper (1/1)	(Czech Republic) Menšík (1/1)	(Spain) Alcaraz (10/17)	(Norway) Ruud (1/1)	(Spain) Alcaraz (11/17)	(United States) Shelton (1/2)	(Spain) Alcaraz (13/17)	(Monaco) Vacherot (1/1)	(Italy) Sinner (10/17)
2026	(Spain) Alcaraz (15/17)	(Germany) Zverev (11/12)	(Italy) Sinner (17/17)	(Germany) Zverev (12/12)	(Spain) Alcaraz (17/17)		(Italy) Sinner (12/17)	(Italy) Sinner (13/17)	(Italy) Sinner (14/17)	(Italy) Sinner (15/17)	(Italy) Sinner (16/17)	(United States) Shelton (2/2)	(France) Fils (1/1)	(Spain) Davidovich Fokina (1/1)	(Spain) Alcaraz (16/17)
Year	Australian Open	French Open	Wimbledon	US Open	ATP Finals	Olympics	Indian Wells	Miami	Monte Carlo	Madrid	Rome	Canada	Cincinnati	Shanghai	Paris

== Big Titles leaders ==
- Top leaders with 8 titles minimum since 1990 (active players and records in bold).

Titles	Player	Majors	Masters	ATP Finals	Olympics
72	(Serbia) **Novak Djokovic**	**24**	**40**	**7**	1
59	(Spain) Rafael Nadal	22	36	—	1
54	(Switzerland) Roger Federer	20	28	6	—
30	(United States) Pete Sampras	14	11	5	—
27	(United States) Andre Agassi	8	17	1	1
20	(United Kingdom) Andy Murray	3	14	1	**2**
17	(Italy) **Jannik Sinner**	5	10	2	—
17	(Spain) **Carlos Alcaraz**	7	9	1	—
12	(Germany) **Alexander Zverev**	2	7	2	1
9	(Germany) Boris Becker (Note: Six of Becker's 15 Big Titles were won before the ATP Tour era.)	2 (+4)	5	2 (+2)	—
9	(United States) Jim Courier	4	5	—	—
9	(Brazil) Gustavo Kuerten	3	5	1	—
9	(Austria) Thomas Muster	1	8	—	—
8	(Russia) **Daniil Medvedev**	1	6	1	—

== Big Titles sweep ==
Winning all of the Big Titles over the course of a player's career: all four Grand Slam titles, all active Masters Series titles, the year-end championship title, and the Olympic gold medal. The feats of the Career Super Slam, the Career Golden Slam, the Career Grand Slam, as well as the Career Golden Masters are all achieved for the player who has completed the sweep. The feat of completing the Big Titles sweep has been described as completing the game of tennis.

- The event at which the sweep was completed indicated in **bold**.

Player	AU	FR	WB	US	YEC	OG	IW	MIA	MC	MAD	ROM	CAN	CIN	SHA	PAR
(Serbia) Novak Djokovic	2008	2016	2011	2011	2008	**2024**	2008	2007	2013	2011	2008	2007	2018	2012	2009

=== Surface sweeps ===
A surface sweep refers to the achievement of winning all of the Big Titles tied to a specific court surface at least once during a player's career.

As of 2026, the feat has been achieved 6 times by 4 different players on hardcourts and 9 times by 4 different players on clay courts.

Novak Djokovic is the only player to have completed both sweeps, a feat he has accomplished twice.

==== Hardcourt sweep ====
Because of the number of mandatory events played on hard-courts, the hard-court sweep is considered among the most grueling in the sport. It consists of winning the Australian Open, the US Open, the year-end championship, and 6 Masters tournaments (Note: The Paris Masters is not to be considered before it switched from carpet to hard-courts in 2007.).

Jannik Sinner is the youngest man to complete the hard-court sweep, at 24 years 6 months and 7 days old.

As of 2026, this feat has never been achieved in a calendar season.

- The event at which the sweep was completed indicated in **bold**.

Player	AU	US	YEC	IW	MIA	CAN	CIN	MAD/SHA (Note: The eighth Masters event moved from Madrid to Shanghai in 2009.)	PAR
(United States) Andre Agassi (Note: He additionally won an Olympic gold medal on hard-courts in 1996.)	1995	1994	1990	2001	1990	1992	1995	**2002**	N/A (Note: Agassi retired in 2006, before the tournament switched to hard courts. He had previously won the tournament twice.)
(Switzerland) Roger Federer (Note: He additionally won multiple Shangai Masters titles.)	2004	2004	2003	2004	2005	2004	2005	**2006** (Note: By winning the 2006 Madrid title, he had won all the hard-court titles available at the time, since the Paris Masters was not a hard-court title yet.)	**2011**
(Serbia) Novak Djokovic (1)	2008	2011	2008	2008	2007	2007	**2018**	2012	2009
(Serbia) Novak Djokovic (2)	2011	2015	2012	2011	2011	2011	**2020**	2013	2013
(Serbia) Novak Djokovic (3)	2012	2018	2013	2014	2012	2012	**2023**	2015	2014
(Italy) Jannik Sinner	2024	2024	2024	**2026**	2024	2023	2024	2024	2025

==== Clay sweep ====
The clay-court sweep consists of winning the French Open and the three Masters 1000 events: Monte Carlo, Madrid or Hamburg (Note: The fourth Masters event moved from Hamburg to Madrid in 2009.), and Rome.

Rafael Nadal holds multiple records in this category. He is the youngest man to complete the clay-court sweep, at 21 years 11 months and 15 days old. He is the only player in the list to have won both the Hamburg Open and the Madrid Open as clay-court masters. Finally, he is the only player to have achieved this feat in a calendar season (2010).

- The event at which the sweep was completed indicated in **bold**.

Player	MC	HAM/MAD	ROM	FR
(Brazil) Gustavo Kuerten	1999	**2000**	1999	1997
(Spain) Rafael Nadal (1)	2005	**2008**	2005	2005
(Spain) Rafael Nadal (2)	2006	**2010**	2006	2006
(Spain) Rafael Nadal (3)	2007	**2013**	2007	2007
(Spain) Rafael Nadal (4)	2008	**2014**	2009	2008
(Serbia) Novak Djokovic (1) (Note: He additionally won an Olympic gold medal on clay-courts in 2024.)	2013	2011	2008	**2016**
(Spain) Rafael Nadal (5)	2009	**2017**	2010	2010
(Serbia) Novak Djokovic (2)	2015	2016	2011	**2021**
(Spain) Carlos Alcaraz	2025	2022	**2025**	2024

==== Other surfaces ====
Due to the scarcity of tournaments on the remaining surfaces, it is technically inaccurate to speak of 'sweeps'; however, there are two noteworthy cases.

Andy Murray is the only player since 1990 to win two different Big Titles on grass courts, having secured the gold medal at the 2012 Olympic tournament held at the All England Club and the 2013 Wimbledon title.

Boris Becker is the only player since 1990 to win multiple different tournaments in the brief history of carpet court Big Titles, having secured the 1990 Stockholm Open title, the 1992 Paris Open title, and the 1996 Stuttgart Super 9 title.

=== Calendar sweeps ===
A calendar sweep is defined as the achievement of winning all titles within a specific quarter of a single calendar year.

Combination	Winner	Year
Australian Open—Indian Wells—Miami "Sunshine Slam"	(United States) Pete Sampras	1994
Australian Open—Indian Wells—Miami "Sunshine Slam"	(United States) Andre Agassi	2001
Australian Open—Indian Wells—Miami "Sunshine Slam"	(Switzerland) Roger Federer	2006
Australian Open—Indian Wells—Miami "Sunshine Slam"	(Switzerland) Roger Federer	2017
Australian Open—Indian Wells—Miami "Sunshine Slam"	(Serbia) Novak Djokovic	2011
Australian Open—Indian Wells—Miami "Sunshine Slam"	(Serbia) Novak Djokovic	2015
Australian Open—Indian Wells—Miami "Sunshine Slam"	(Serbia) Novak Djokovic	2016
Monte Carlo—Madrid—Rome—French Open "Clay Slam"	(Spain) Rafael Nadal	2010
Canada—Cincinnati—US Open "Summer Slam"	(Australia) Patrick Rafter	1998
Canada—Cincinnati—US Open "Summer Slam"	(United States) Andy Roddick	2003
Canada—Cincinnati—US Open "Summer Slam"	(Spain) Rafael Nadal	2013
Shanghai—Paris—Year-End Championship "Autumn Sweep"	(Serbia) Novak Djokovic	2013
Shanghai—Paris—Year-End Championship "Autumn Sweep"	(Serbia) Novak Djokovic	2015
Shanghai—Paris—Year-End Championship "Autumn Sweep"	(United Kingdom) Andy Murray	2016

== Statistics ==
Correct as of the 2026 Cincinnati Open (with active players in bold).

#	Big Titles
72	(Serbia) **Novak Djokovic**
59	(Spain) Rafael Nadal
54	(Switzerland) Roger Federer
30	(United States) Pete Sampras
27	(United States) Andre Agassi

#	Big Title finals
108	(Serbia) **Novak Djokovic**
92	(Switzerland) Roger Federer
86	(Spain) Rafael Nadal
46	(United States) Pete Sampras
43	(United States) Andre Agassi

#	Big Titles in a season	Year
10	(Serbia) **Novak Djokovic**	2015
8	(Switzerland) Roger Federer	2006
8	(Serbia) **Novak Djokovic** (2)	2011
7	(Switzerland) Roger Federer (2)	2004
7	(Spain) Rafael Nadal	2013

#	Big finals in a season	Year
13	(Serbia) **Novak Djokovic**	2015
11	(Switzerland) Roger Federer	2006
10	(Switzerland) Roger Federer (2)	2007
10	(Serbia) **Novak Djokovic** (2)	2012
10	(United Kingdom) Andy Murray	2016

#	Consecutive Big Titles	Years
7	(Serbia) **Novak Djokovic**	2015–16
6	(Serbia) **Novak Djokovic** (2)	2014–15
5	(Spain) Rafael Nadal	2010
5	(Italy) **Jannik Sinner**	2026
4	(Spain) Rafael Nadal (2)	2008

#	Consecutive Big finals	Years
12	(Serbia) **Novak Djokovic**	2015-16
7	(Switzerland) Roger Federer	2007
7	(Spain) Rafael Nadal	2011
6	(Switzerland) Roger Federer (2)	2005–06
6	(Serbia) **Novak Djokovic** (2)	2014–15
6	(Serbia) **Novak Djokovic** (3)	2018–19

#	Big Titles streak (Note: This category disregards any tournament in which the player did not compete.)	Years
7	(Serbia) **Novak Djokovic**	2014–15
7	(Serbia) **Novak Djokovic** (2)	2015–16
5	(Spain) Rafael Nadal	2010
5	(Serbia) **Novak Djokovic** (3)	2011
5	(Italy) **Jannik Sinner**	2024–25
5	(Italy) **Jannik Sinner** (2)	2026
4	(Switzerland) Roger Federer	2006–07
4	(Spain) Rafael Nadal (2)	2008
4	(Switzerland) Roger Federer (2)	2017

#	Big finals streak	Years
18	(Serbia) **Novak Djokovic**	2014–16
12	(Switzerland) Roger Federer	2005–06
10	(Italy) **Jannik Sinner**	2024–25
7	(Switzerland) Roger Federer (2)	2007
7	(Spain) Rafael Nadal	2011
6	(United Kingdom) Andy Murray	2016
6	(Serbia) **Novak Djokovic** (4)	2018–19
6	(Spain) **Carlos Alcaraz**	2025

=== Active players ===
#	Big Titles
72	(Serbia) Novak Djokovic
17	(Italy) Jannik Sinner
17	(Spain) Carlos Alcaraz
12	(Germany) Alexander Zverev
8	(Russia) Daniil Medvedev
4	(Switzerland) Stan Wawrinka
4	(Greece) Stefanos Tsitsipas
2	(Poland) Hubert Hurkacz
2	(United States) Ben Shelton
2	(Croatia) Marin Čilić
2	(Bulgaria) Grigor Dimitrov
2	(Russia) Andrey Rublev

#	Big Title finals
108	(Serbia) Novak Djokovic
24	(Italy) Jannik Sinner
24	(Germany) Alexander Zverev
23	(Spain) Carlos Alcaraz
19	(Russia) Daniil Medvedev
10	(Greece) Stefanos Tsitsipas
8	(Switzerland) Stan Wawrinka
8	(Norway) Casper Ruud
6	(Russia) Andrey Rublev

#	Most finals without a win
5	(Japan) Kei Nishikori
3	(France) Gaël Monfils
2	(Italy) Matteo Berrettini
2	(Belgium) David Goffin
2	(Australia) Nick Kyrgios
2	(Canada) Félix Auger-Aliassime

== See also ==
- List of ATP Big Titles doubles champions
- List of Grand Slam men's singles champions
- ATP Masters 1000 singles records and statistics
- List of Olympic medalists in tennis
- List of WTA Tour top-level tournament singles champions
- List of WTA Tour top-level tournament doubles champions
