= 2010 French Open – Men's singles =

Men's singles
- 2010 French Open

Final
- Champion: (Spain) Rafael Nadal
- Runner-up: (Sweden) Robin Söderling
- Score: 6–4, 6–2, 6–4

Details
- Draw: 128
- Seeds: 32

Events
| Singles | men | women | | boys | girls |
| Doubles | men | women | mixed | boys | girls |
| WC Singles | men | women | quad |
| WC Doubles | men | women | quad |
| Legends | −45 | 45+ | women |
- French Open

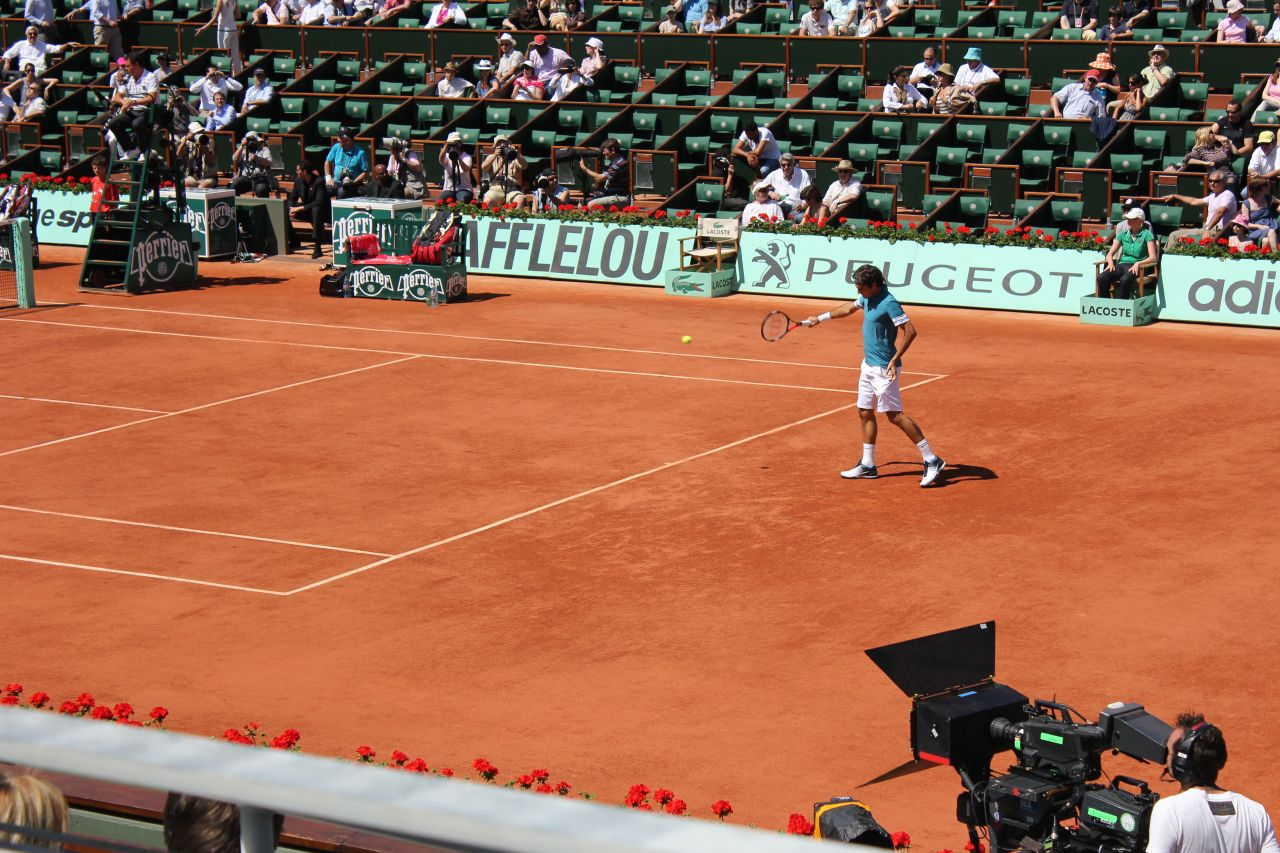
French Open, Paris 24 May 2010 (36)

Rafael Nadal defeated Robin Söderling in the final, 6–4, 6–2, 6–4 to win the men's singles tennis title at the 2010 French Open. It was his fifth French Open title and seventh major title overall. Nadal did not lose a set during the tournament for the second time (after 2008). By winning the title, Nadal regained the world No. 1 ranking from Roger Federer, who was in contention to break Pete Sampras's record of 286 weeks spent at the top position. He also completed the first (and only) Clay Slam in ATP Tour history: a season sweep of the Monte-Carlo, Rome, Madrid, and French Open clay court tournaments, dropping just two sets in 22 matches across the four events.

Federer was the defending champion, but lost in the quarterfinals to Söderling in a rematch of the previous year's final. This marked the first time since the 2004 French Open that Federer did not reach the semifinals of a major, a span of 23 majors. Federer was attempting to become the first man in the Open Era and the third man overall to complete the double career Grand Slam.

From the 2004 Wimbledon Championships and the 2017 Australian Open, this was the only major not to feature either Federer or Novak Djokovic in the semifinals. This was the first of only two times (preceding the 2026 French Open) that Djokovic lost a major match after leading two sets to love, having lost to Jürgen Melzer in the quarterfinals.

== Seeds ==
1. (Switzerland) Roger Federer (quarterfinals)
2. (Spain) Rafael Nadal (champion)
3. (Serbia) Novak Djokovic (quarterfinals)
4. (United Kingdom) Andy Murray (fourth round)
5. (Sweden) Robin Söderling (final)
6. (United States) Andy Roddick (third round)
7. (Spain) Fernando Verdasco (fourth round)
8. (France) Jo-Wilfried Tsonga (fourth round, retired because of a right leg injury)
9. (Spain) David Ferrer (third round)
10. (Croatia) Marin Čilić (fourth round)
11. (Russia) Mikhail Youzhny (quarterfinals)
12. (Chile) Fernando González (second round)
13. (France) Gaël Monfils (second round)
14. (Croatia) Ivan Ljubičić (third round)
15. (Czech Republic) Tomáš Berdych (semifinals)
16. (Spain) Juan Carlos Ferrero (third round)

17. (United States) John Isner (third round)
18. (United States) Sam Querrey (first round)
19. (Spain) Nicolás Almagro (quarterfinals)
20. (Switzerland) Stan Wawrinka (fourth round)
21. (Spain) Tommy Robredo (first round)
22. (Austria) Jürgen Melzer (semifinals)
23. (Latvia) Ernests Gulbis (first round)
24. (Brazil) Thomaz Bellucci (fourth round)
25. (Cyprus) Marcos Baghdatis (third round)
26. (Argentina) Juan Mónaco (first round)
27. (Spain) Feliciano López (first round)
28. (Australia) Lleyton Hewitt (third round)
29. (Spain) Albert Montañés (third round)
30. (Germany) Philipp Kohlschreiber (third round)
31. (Romania) Victor Hănescu (third round)
32. (Spain) Guillermo García López (second round)

Click on the seed number of a player to go to their draw section.

== Draw ==
Key

- Q = Qualifier
- WC = Wild card
- LL = Lucky loser
- Alt = Alternate
- ITF = ITF entry
- PR = Protected ranking
- SR = Special ranking
- SE = Special exempt
- JE = Junior exempt
- JR = Junior Accelerator Programme entrant
- CO = College Accelerator Programme entrant
- NG = Next Gen Accelerator Program entrant
- w/o = Walkover
- r = Retired
- d = Defaulted

=== Finals ===
Quarterfinals
1 | (Switzerland) Roger Federer | 6 | 3 | 5 | 4
5 | (Sweden) Robin Söderling | 3 | 6 | 7 | 6
15 | (Czech Republic) Tomáš Berdych | 6 | 6 | 6
11 | (Russia) Mikhail Youzhny | 3 | 1 | 2
22 | (Austria) Jürgen Melzer | 3 | 2 | 6 | 7^{7} | 6
3 | (Serbia) Novak Djokovic | 6 | 6 | 2 | 6^{3} | 4
19 | (Spain) Nicolás Almagro | 6^{2} | 6^{3} | 4
2 | (Spain) Rafael Nadal | 7^{7} | 7^{7} | 6

Semifinals
5 | (Sweden) Robin Söderling | 6 | 3 | 5 | 6 | 6
15 | (Czech Republic) Tomáš Berdych | 3 | 6 | 7 | 3 | 3
22 | (Austria) Jürgen Melzer | 2 | 3 | 6^{6}
2 | (Spain) Rafael Nadal | 6 | 6 | 7^{8}

Final
5 | (Sweden) Robin Söderling | 4 | 2 | 4
2 | (Spain) Rafael Nadal | 6 | 6 | 6

=== Top half ===
==== Section 1 ====
First round
1 | (Switzerland) R Federer | 6 | 6 | 6
(Australia) P Luczak | 4 | 1 | 2
(Serbia) J Tipsarević | 1 | 2 | 3
(Colombia) A Falla | 6 | 6 | 6
Q | (France) B Paire | 6 | 6^{4} | 4 | 5
(Belgium) O Rochus | 3 | 7^{7} | 6 | 7
Q | (Germany) J Reister | 6 | 7^{7} | 6
27 | (Spain) F López | 1 | 6^{5} | 2
20 | (Switzerland) S Wawrinka | 6 | 6 | 6
(Czech Republic) J Hájek | 1 | 3 | 3
(Italy) P Lorenzi | 6 | 3 | 2 | 2
(Germany) A Beck | 4 | 6 | 6 | 6
(Chile) N Massú | 1 | 6 | 6 | 3 | 3
(Italy) F Fognini | 6 | 3 | 2 | 6 | 6
LL | (Germany) D Kindlmann | 3 | 5 | 7^{7} | 2
13 | (France) G Monfils | 6 | 7 | 6^{5} | 6

Second round
1 | (Switzerland) R Federer | 7^{7} | 6 | 6
(Colombia) A Falla | 6^{4} | 2 | 4
(Belgium) O Rochus | 2 | 2 | 6^{5}
Q | (Germany) J Reister | 6 | 6 | 7^{7}
20 | (Switzerland) S Wawrinka | 6 | 6 | 6
(Germany) A Beck | 1 | 4 | 4
(Italy) F Fognini | 2 | 4 | 7 | 6 | 9
13 | (France) G Monfils | 6 | 6 | 5 | 4 | 7

Third round
1 | (Switzerland) R Federer | 6 | 6 | 6
Q | (Germany) J Reister | 4 | 0 | 4
20 | (Switzerland) S Wawrinka | 6 | 6 | 6
(Italy) F Fognini | 3 | 4 | 1

Fourth round
1 | (Switzerland) R Federer | 6 | 7^{7} | 6
20 | (Switzerland) S Wawrinka | 3 | 6^{5} | 2

==== Section 2 ====
First round
10 | (Croatia) M Čilić | 6 | 3 | 6 | 6
(Brazil) R Mello | 1 | 6 | 3 | 1
PR | (Russia) D Tursunov | 1 | 1 | 1
(Spain) D Gimeno Traver | 6 | 6 | 6
(Argentina) L Mayer | 7^{7} | 6 | 6
(Ukraine) S Stakhovsky | 6^{4} | 3 | 2
(France) J Benneteau | 6 | 6 | 1
23 | (Latvia) E Gulbis | 4 | 2 | 0^{r}
29 | (Spain) A Montañés | 6 | 6 | 6
Q | (Italy) S Galvani | 3 | 3 | 3
(France) S Robert | 0 | 4 | 3
Q | (Germany) T Kamke | 6 | 6 | 6
(Ecuador) N Lapentti | 3 | 4 | 6^{3}
(United States) T Dent | 6 | 6 | 7^{7}
WC | (France) L Recouderc | 0 | 2 | 3
5 | (Sweden) R Söderling | 6 | 6 | 6

Second round
10 | (Croatia) M Čilić | 6 | 7^{7} | 6
(Spain) D Gimeno Traver | 3 | 6^{4} | 2
(Argentina) L Mayer | 6^{4} | 6 | 6 | 6
(France) J Benneteau | 7^{7} | 3 | 4 | 4
29 | (Spain) A Montañés | 6 | 6 | 6
Q | (Germany) T Kamke | 3 | 2 | 1
(United States) T Dent | 0 | 1 | 1
5 | (Sweden) R Söderling | 6 | 6 | 6

Third round
10 | (Croatia) M Čilić | 6 | 3 | 7 | 6^{5} | 6
(Argentina) L Mayer | 4 | 6 | 5 | 7^{7} | 4
29 | (Spain) A Montañés | 4 | 5 | 6 | 3
5 | (Sweden) R Söderling | 6 | 7 | 2 | 6

Fourth round
10 | (Croatia) M Čilić | 4 | 4 | 2
5 | (Sweden) R Söderling | 6 | 6 | 6

==== Section 3 ====
First round
4 | (United Kingdom) A Murray | 4 | 6^{5} | 6 | 6 | 6
(France) R Gasquet | 6 | 7^{7} | 4 | 2 | 1
(Argentina) JI Chela | 6 | 6 | 7^{7}
WC | (United States) R Sweeting | 0 | 4 | 6^{4}
(France) P-H Mathieu | 6 | 3 | 0^{r}
(Spain) M Granollers | 3 | 6 | 3
Q | (United States) J Witten | 3 | 4 | 3
25 | (Cyprus) M Baghdatis | 6 | 6 | 6
17 | (United States) J Isner | 6 | 6 | 6
(Kazakhstan) A Golubev | 4 | 3 | 2
Q | (India) S Devvarman | 3 | 6 | 3 | 6 | 3
(Switzerland) M Chiudinelli | 6 | 3 | 6 | 3 | 6
WC | (France) É Roger-Vasselin | 1 | 4 | 6 | 7^{7} | 6
(South Africa) K Anderson | 6 | 6 | 3 | 6^{4} | 1
Q | (Chile) J Aguilar | 6^{7} | 3 | 1
15 | (Czech Republic) T Berdych | 7^{9} | 6 | 6

Second round
4 | (United Kingdom) A Murray | 6 | 6^{5} | 6 | 6
(Argentina) JI Chela | 2 | 7^{7} | 3 | 2
(Spain) M Granollers | 6 | 1 | 5 | 2
25 | (Cyprus) M Baghdatis | 4 | 6 | 7 | 6
17 | (United States) J Isner | 6^{3} | 7^{7} | 7^{9} | 6
(Switzerland) M Chiudinelli | 7^{7} | 6^{3} | 6^{7} | 4
WC | (France) É Roger-Vasselin | 5 | 1 | 4
15 | (Czech Republic) T Berdych | 7 | 6 | 6

Third round
4 | (United Kingdom) A Murray | 6 | 6 | 0 | 6
25 | (Cyprus) M Baghdatis | 2 | 3 | 6 | 2
17 | (United States) J Isner | 2 | 2 | 1
15 | (Czech Republic) T Berdych | 6 | 6 | 6

Fourth round
4 | (United Kingdom) A Murray | 4 | 5 | 3
15 | (Czech Republic) T Berdych | 6 | 7 | 6

==== Section 4 ====
First round
11 | (Russia) M Youzhny | 6 | 6 | 6
(Poland) M Przysiężny | 1 | 0 | 4
Q | (United States) M Yani | 6 | 6^{5} | 6^{4} | 7^{7} | 10
(Slovakia) L Lacko | 4 | 7^{7} | 7^{7} | 6^{5} | 12
(Germany) P Petzschner | 6 | 7^{7} | 2 | 5 | 7
WC | (Australia) C Ball | 3 | 6^{4} | 6 | 7 | 9
(Serbia) V Troicki | 6 | 6 | 6
21 | (Spain) T Robredo | 4 | 4 | 3
32 | (Spain) G García López | 7 | 6 | 6
(Germany) R Schüttler | 5 | 4 | 2
Q | (France) O Patience | 4 | 7 | 4 | 3
(Netherlands) T de Bakker | 6 | 5 | 6 | 6
WC | (France) J Ouanna | 7^{7} | 6^{4} | 6 | 6
(Poland) Ł Kubot | 6^{5} | 7^{7} | 2 | 4
(Germany) D Brands | 6 | 3 | 2 | 7^{7} | 5
8 | (France) J-W Tsonga | 4 | 6 | 6 | 6^{2} | 7

Second round
11 | (Russia) M Youzhny | 6^{8} | 6 | 6 | 6
(Slovakia) L Lacko | 7^{10} | 3 | 3 | 2
WC | (Australia) C Ball | 4 | 3 | 3
(Serbia) V Troicki | 6 | 6 | 6
32 | (Spain) G García López | 3 | 6 | 6^{5} | 5
(Netherlands) T de Bakker | 6 | 3 | 7^{7} | 7
WC | (France) J Ouanna | 0 | 1 | 4
8 | (France) J-W Tsonga | 6 | 6 | 6

Third round
11 | (Russia) M Youzhny | 2 | 7^{7} | 6 | 6
(Serbia) V Troicki | 6 | 6^{4} | 2 | 3
(Netherlands) T de Bakker | 7^{8} | 6^{4} | 3 | 4
8 | (France) J-W Tsonga | 6^{6} | 7^{7} | 6 | 6

Fourth round
11 | (Russia) M Youzhny | 6 | 0
8 | (France) J-W Tsonga | 2 | 0^{r}

=== Bottom half ===
==== Section 5 ====
First round
6 | (United States) A Roddick | 6 | 4 | 4 | 7^{7} | 6
(Finland) J Nieminen | 2 | 6 | 6 | 6^{4} | 3
(Argentina) E Schwank | 6 | 3 | 5 | 0^{r}
(Slovenia) B Kavčič | 3 | 6 | 7 | 4
Q | (Russia) T Gabashvili | 6 | 6 | 6
(Austria) D Köllerer | 2 | 2 | 1
Q | (Slovenia) G Žemlja | 7^{8} | 3 | 7 | 6
26 | (Argentina) J Mónaco | 6^{6} | 6 | 5 | 3
22 | (Austria) J Melzer | 7 | 6 | 6
(Israel) D Sela | 5 | 2 | 4
(Germany) M Zverev | 1 | 2 | 4
WC | (France) N Mahut | 6 | 6 | 6
(Belgium) X Malisse | 6 | 7^{9} | 6
(Germany) S Greul | 4 | 6^{7} | 4
WC | (France) D Guez | 1 | 3 | 1
9 | (Spain) D Ferrer | 6 | 6 | 6

Second round
6 | (United States) A Roddick | 6 | 5 | 6 | 6
(Slovenia) B Kavčič | 3 | 7 | 4 | 2
Q | (Russia) T Gabashvili | 6 | 6 | 6
Q | (Slovenia) G Žemlja | 3 | 1 | 1
22 | (Austria) J Melzer | 6 | 3 | 7^{9} | 6
WC | (France) N Mahut | 1 | 6 | 6^{7} | 4
(Belgium) X Malisse | 2 | 2 | 0^{r}
9 | (Spain) D Ferrer | 6 | 6 | 2

Third round
6 | (United States) A Roddick | 4 | 4 | 2
Q | (Russia) T Gabashvili | 6 | 6 | 6
22 | (Austria) J Melzer | 6 | 6 | 7^{7}
9 | (Spain) D Ferrer | 4 | 0 | 6^{1}

Fourth round
Q | (Russia) T Gabashvili | 6^{6} | 6 | 1 | 4
22 | (Austria) J Melzer | 7^{8} | 4 | 6 | 6

==== Section 6 ====
First round
16 | (Spain) JC Ferrero | 6 | 6 | 6
(Uruguay) P Cuevas | 4 | 3 | 1
(France) M Gicquel | 3 | 2 | 6^{5}
(Spain) P Riba | 6 | 6 | 7^{7}
(Italy) P Starace | 6^{5} | 6 | 6 | 6
(Ukraine) I Marchenko | 7^{7} | 1 | 3 | 3
(United States) R Ginepri | 4 | 7^{7} | 6 | 6
18 | (United States) S Querrey | 6 | 6^{3} | 4 | 2
31 | (Romania) V Hănescu | 6 | 1 | 6 | 6
(Spain) Ó Hernández | 1 | 6 | 4 | 3
(United States) R Ram | 6 | 4 | 2 | 4
Q | (Kazakhstan) Y Schukin | 3 | 6 | 6 | 6
PR | (Japan) K Nishikori | 2 | 4 | 7^{7} | 6 | 6
(Colombia) S Giraldo | 6 | 6 | 6^{3} | 2 | 4
(Kazakhstan) E Korolev | 1 | 6 | 1 | 3
3 | (Serbia) N Djokovic | 6 | 3 | 6 | 6

Second round
16 | (Spain) JC Ferrero | 7^{7} | 6^{13} | 6 | 6
(Spain) P Riba | 6^{5} | 7^{15} | 2 | 2
(Italy) P Starace | 6 | 4 | 3 | 3
(United States) R Ginepri | 3 | 6 | 6 | 6
31 | (Romania) V Hănescu | 6 | 6 | 6
Q | (Kazakhstan) Y Schukin | 3 | 4 | 2
PR | (Japan) K Nishikori | 1 | 4 | 4
3 | (Serbia) N Djokovic | 6 | 6 | 6

Third round
16 | (Spain) JC Ferrero | 5 | 3 | 6 | 6 | 4
(United States) R Ginepri | 7 | 6 | 3 | 2 | 6
31 | (Romania) V Hănescu | 3 | 6 | 3 | 2
3 | (Serbia) N Djokovic | 6 | 3 | 6 | 6

Fourth round
(United States) R Ginepri | 4 | 6 | 1 | 2
3 | (Serbia) N Djokovic | 6 | 2 | 6 | 6

==== Section 7 ====
First round
7 | (Spain) F Verdasco | 6 | 6 | 6
(Russia) I Kunitsyn | 4 | 2 | 2
(France) F Serra | 6 | 6 | 6
(United States) M Russell | 4 | 0 | 1
LL | (Spain) S Ventura | 5 | 4 | 5
(Italy) A Seppi | 7 | 6 | 7
(Slovakia) K Beck | 6^{7} | 1 | 1
30 | (Germany) P Kohlschreiber | 7^{9} | 6 | 6
19 | (Spain) N Almagro | 6 | 3 | 4 | 7^{7} | 6
PR | (Netherlands) R Haase | 4 | 6 | 6 | 6^{3} | 4
PR | (Belgium) K Vliegen | 1 | 4 | 4
(Belgium) S Darcis | 6 | 6 | 6
(France) A Clément | 6 | 6^{5} | 6 | 3 | 3
(Ukraine) A Dolgopolov | 3 | 7^{7} | 3 | 6 | 6
Q | (Brazil) T Alves | 2 | 6 | 4 | 4
12 | (Chile) F González | 6 | 4 | 6 | 6

Second round
7 | (Spain) F Verdasco | 6 | 6 | 0 | 6
(France) F Serra | 2 | 2 | 6 | 4
(Italy) A Seppi | 6^{5} | 3 | 5
30 | (Germany) P Kohlschreiber | 7^{7} | 6 | 7
19 | (Spain) N Almagro | 6 | 6 | 7
(Belgium) S Darcis | 3 | 0 | 5
(Ukraine) A Dolgopolov | 6 | 6 | 6
12 | (Chile) F González | 3 | 4 | 3

Third round
7 | (Spain) F Verdasco | 2 | 6 | 6 | 6^{1} | 6
30 | (Germany) P Kohlschreiber | 6 | 3 | 3 | 7^{7} | 4
19 | (Spain) N Almagro | 6 | 6 | 6
(Ukraine) A Dolgopolov | 3 | 3 | 4

Fourth round
7 | (Spain) F Verdasco | 1 | 6 | 1 | 4
19 | (Spain) N Almagro | 6 | 4 | 6 | 6

==== Section 8 ====
First round
14 | (Croatia) I Ljubičić | 7^{7} | 7 | 6
(Chinese Taipei) Y-h Lu | 6^{5} | 5 | 3
(Germany) M Berrer | 7 | 4 | 6 | 1 | 3
(United States) M Fish | 5 | 6 | 3 | 6 | 6
Q | (Spain) P Andújar | 7^{7} | 6 | 6
Q | (Italy) S Bolelli | 6^{2} | 4 | 2
(France) M Llodra | 4 | 2 | 2
24 | (Brazil) T Bellucci | 6 | 6 | 6
28 | (Australia) L Hewitt | 7 | 6 | 6
(France) J Chardy | 5 | 0 | 4
(Uzbekistan) D Istomin | 7 | 7 | 6
(Germany) B Becker | 5 | 5 | 3
(Argentina) H Zeballos | 7^{8} | 6^{8} | 1 | 6 | 8
Q | (Austria) M Fischer | 6^{6} | 7^{10} | 6 | 4 | 6
WC | (France) G Mina | 2 | 2 | 2
2 | (Spain) R Nadal | 6 | 6 | 6

Second round
14 | (Croatia) I Ljubičić | 6 | 6^{8} | 4 | 6 | 10
(United States) M Fish | 2 | 7^{10} | 6 | 2 | 8
Q | (Spain) P Andújar | 6 | 3 | 6 | 4 | 2
24 | (Brazil) T Bellucci | 1 | 6 | 2 | 6 | 6
28 | (Australia) L Hewitt | 1 | 6 | 6 | 2 | 6
(Uzbekistan) D Istomin | 6 | 3 | 4 | 6 | 2
(Argentina) H Zeballos | 2 | 2 | 3
2 | (Spain) R Nadal | 6 | 6 | 6

Third round
14 | (Croatia) I Ljubičić | 6^{4} | 2 | 4
24 | (Brazil) T Bellucci | 7^{7} | 6 | 6
28 | (Australia) L Hewitt | 3 | 4 | 3
2 | (Spain) R Nadal | 6 | 6 | 6

Fourth round
24 | (Brazil) T Bellucci | 2 | 5 | 4
2 | (Spain) R Nadal | 6 | 7 | 6

| Preceded by 2010 Australian Open – Men's singles | Grand Slam men's singles | Succeeded by 2010 Wimbledon Championships – Men's singles |
