= 2010 Mutua Madrileña Madrid Open – Men's singles =

Men's singles
- 2010 Mutua Madrileña Madrid Open

Final
- Champion: (Spain) Rafael Nadal
- Runner-up: (Switzerland) Roger Federer
- Score: 6–4, 7–6^{(7–5)}

Events
Singles	men	women
Doubles	men	women
- Mutua Madrileña Madrid Open

Rafael Nadal defeated defending champion Roger Federer in a rematch of the previous year's final, 6–4, 7–6^{(7–5)} to win the men's singles tennis title at the 2010 Madrid Open. It was his second Madrid Open title and 18th Masters 1000 title overall, surpassing Andre Agassi's record (since the series started in 1990). It also marked the third leg of Nadal’s Clay Slam: a season sweep of the Monte-Carlo, Rome, Madrid, and French Open clay court tournaments.

This tournament marked the final professional appearance of former world No. 1, 1998 French Open and three-time Masters champion Carlos Moyá; he lost in the first round to Benjamin Becker.

== Seeds ==
The top eight seeds receive a bye into the second round.

1. (Switzerland) Roger Federer (final)
2. (Spain) Rafael Nadal (champion)
3. (United Kingdom) Andy Murray (quarterfinals)
4. (Sweden) Robin Söderling (second round)
5. (United States) ~~Andy Roddick~~ (withdrew due to stomach virus)
6. (Spain) Fernando Verdasco (third round)
7. (France) Jo-Wilfried Tsonga (second round, retired due to back injury)
8. (Croatia) Marin Čilić (third round)
9. (Spain) David Ferrer (semifinals)
10. (Russia) Mikhail Youzhny (second round)
11. (Czech Republic) ~~Tomáš Berdych~~ (withdrew due to right hip injury)
12. (France) Gaël Monfils (quarterfinals)
13. (United States) John Isner (third round)
14. (United States) Sam Querrey (first round)
15. (Switzerland) Stanislas Wawrinka (third round)
16. (Brazil) Thomaz Bellucci (second round)

== Draw ==
Key

- Q = Qualifier
- WC = Wild card
- LL = Lucky loser
- Alt = Alternate
- ITF = ITF entry
- PR = Protected ranking
- SR = Special ranking
- SE = Special exempt
- JE = Junior exempt
- JR = Junior Accelerator Programme entrant
- CO = College Accelerator Programme entrant
- NG = Next Gen Accelerator Program entrant
- w/o = Walkover
- r = Retired
- d = Defaulted

=== Finals ===
Quarterfinals
1	(Switzerland) Roger Federer	3	6	6
(Latvia) Ernests Gulbis	6	1	4
3	(United Kingdom) Andy Murray	5	3
9	(Spain) David Ferrer	7	6
(Austria) Jürgen Melzer	3	1
(Spain) Nicolás Almagro	6	6
12	(France) Gaël Monfils	1	3
2	(Spain) Rafael Nadal	6	6

Semifinals
1	(Switzerland) Roger Federer	7	3	6
9	(Spain) David Ferrer	5	6	3
(Spain) Nicolás Almagro	6	2	2
2	(Spain) Rafael Nadal	4	6	6

Final
1	(Switzerland) Roger Federer	4	6^{5}
2	(Spain) Rafael Nadal	6	7

=== Top half ===
==== Section 1 ====
First round
WC	(Spain) C Moyá	0	2
(Germany) B Becker	6	6
(Argentina) L Mayer	6^{9}	7	6
(France) J Benneteau	7	5	4
(Spain) M Granollers	4	4
15	(Switzerland) S Wawrinka	6	6
10	(Russia) M Youzhny	2	6	6
(Slovakia) L Lacko	6	3	1
(Latvia) E Gulbis	7	6
(Spain) A Montañés	5	1
(Poland) Ł Kubot	3	3
(Spain) F López	6	6

Second round
1	(Switzerland) R Federer	6	7
(Germany) B Becker	2	6^{4}
(Argentina) L Mayer	4	2	r
15	(Switzerland) S Wawrinka	6	4
10	(Russia) M Youzhny	6^{2}	4
(Latvia) E Gulbis	7	6
(Spain) F López	6	6
LL	(Spain) Ó Hernández	1	2

Third round
1	(Switzerland) R Federer	6	6
15	(Switzerland) S Wawrinka	3	1
(Latvia) E Gulbis	6	7
(Spain) F López	2	6^{0}

Quarterfinals
1	(Switzerland) R Federer	3	6	6
(Latvia) E Gulbis	6	1	4

==== Section 2 ====
First round
(Uruguay) P Cuevas	0	r
Q	(Argentina) JI Chela	2
(Romania) V Hănescu	3	6
(Russia) I Andreev	6	5	r
Q	(Spain) D Muñoz de la Nava	6^{5}	6	7
14	(United States) S Querrey	7	3	5
9	(Spain) D Ferrer	6	7
(France) J Chardy	3	6^{2}
(Cyprus) M Baghdatis	6	6
(Switzerland) M Chiudinelli	3	4
(France) P-H Mathieu	3	3
(Argentina) E Schwank	6	6

Second round
3	(United Kingdom) A Murray	6	6
Q	(Argentina) JI Chela	3	3
(Romania) V Hănescu	6	4	6
Q	(Spain) D Muñoz de la Nava	0	6	3
9	(Spain) D Ferrer	1	6	7
(Cyprus) M Baghdatis	6	3	5
(Argentina) E Schwank	3	0
8	(Croatia) M Čilić	6	6

Third round
3	(United Kingdom) A Murray	6	6
(Romania) V Hănescu	2	1
9	(Spain) D Ferrer	6	6
8	(Croatia) M Čilić	3	2

Quarterfinals
3	(United Kingdom) A Murray	5	3
9	(Spain) D Ferrer	7	6

=== Bottom half ===
==== Section 3 ====
First round
(Kazakhstan) E Korolev	4	6^{5}
(Croatia) I Karlović	6	7
Q	(South Africa) K Anderson	2	6	4
(Austria) J Melzer	6	2	6
LL	(United States) M Fish	6	7
LL	(United States) M Russell	2	6^{1}
16	(Brazil) T Bellucci	7	6
WC	(Spain) P Riba	6^{5}	1
(Argentina) J Mónaco	6	6
(Germany) S Greul	1	1
(Spain) N Almagro	6	7
(Serbia) V Troicki	1	6^{3}

Second round
6	(Spain) F Verdasco	7	6
(Croatia) I Karlović	6^{5}	3
(Austria) J Melzer	3	6	6
LL	(United States) M Fish	6	1	4
16	(Brazil) T Bellucci	2	2
(Argentina) J Mónaco	6	6
(Spain) N Almagro	6	7
4	(Sweden) R Söderling	4	5

Third round
6	(Spain) F Verdasco	5	3
(Austria) J Melzer	7	6
(Argentina) J Mónaco	4	1
(Spain) N Almagro	6	6

Quarterfinals
(Austria) J Melzer	3	1
(Spain) N Almagro	6	6

==== Section 4 ====
First round
(Spain) G García López	6	6
Q	(Spain) D Gimeno Traver	3	4
(Italy) F Fognini	1	6	5
(Germany) P Petzschner	6	4	7
(France) S Robert	2	5
12	(France) G Monfils	6	7
13	(United States) J Isner	5	6	6
Q	(Belgium) C Rochus	7	2	2
(Germany) P Kohlschreiber	6	2	3
Q	(Colombia) S Giraldo	1	6	6
Q	(Ukraine) O Dolgopolov Jr.	6	6
(Italy) A Seppi	3	4

Second round
7	(France) J-W Tsonga	2	r
(Spain) G García López	6
(Germany) P Petzschner	1	r
12	(France) G Monfils	1
13	(United States) J Isner	1	7	6
Q	(Colombia) S Giraldo	6	6^{6}	2
Q	(Ukraine) O Dolgopolov Jr.	4	3
2	(Spain) R Nadal	6	6

Third round
(Spain) G García López	6^{5}	4
12	(France) G Monfils	7	6
13	(United States) J Isner	5	4
2	(Spain) R Nadal	7	6

Quarterfinals
12	(France) G Monfils	1	3
2	(Spain) R Nadal	6	6

== Qualifying ==
=== Seeds ===
1. (Argentina) Juan Ignacio Chela (qualified)
2. (Argentina) ~~Eduardo Schwank~~ (withdrew)
3. (Colombia) Santiago Giraldo (qualified)
4. (Ukraine) Alexandr Dolgopolov (qualified)
5. (Colombia) Alejandro Falla (first round)
6. (United States) Michael Russell (qualifying competition, retired due to wrist injury, lucky loser)
7. (South Africa) Kevin Anderson (qualified)
8. (United States) Mardy Fish (qualifying competition, lucky loser)
9. (Spain) Daniel Gimeno Traver (qualified)
10. (Spain) Óscar Hernández (qualifying competition, lucky loser)
11. (Spain) Iván Navarro (qualifying competition)
12. (Italy) Filippo Volandri (qualifying competition)
13. (Croatia) Ilija Bozoljac (first round)
14. (Brazil) João Souza (first round)

=== Qualifiers ===
1. (Argentina) Juan Ignacio Chela
2. (Spain) Daniel Muñoz de la Nava
3. (Colombia) Santiago Giraldo
4. (Ukraine) Alexandr Dolgopolov
5. (Belgium) Christophe Rochus
6. (Spain) Daniel Gimeno Traver
7. (South Africa) Kevin Anderson

=== Lucky losers ===
1. (United States) Michael Russell
2. (United States) Mardy Fish
3. (Spain) Óscar Hernández

=== Qualifying draw ===
==== First qualifier ====
First round
1	(Argentina) Juan Ignacio Chela	6	6
(Chile) Jorge Aguilar	4	4
(Italy) Flavio Cipolla	7	6
13	(Serbia) Ilija Bozoljac	5	2

Qualifying competition
1	(Argentina) Juan Ignacio Chela	6	6
(Italy) Flavio Cipolla	2	3

==== Second qualifier ====
First round
Alt	(Spain) Arnau Brugués Davi	5	5
(Spain) Guillermo Alcaide	7	7
WC	(Spain) Daniel Muñoz de la Nava	6	6
14	(Brazil) João Souza	4	4

Qualifying competition
(Spain) Guillermo Alcaide	0	4
WC	(Spain) Daniel Muñoz de la Nava	6	6

==== Third qualifier ====
First round
3	(Colombia) Santiago Giraldo	6	6
(France) Alexandre Sidorenko	1	2
(Germany) Nicolas Kiefer	4	2
12	(Italy) Filippo Volandri	6	6

Qualifying competition
3	(Colombia) Santiago Giraldo	6	6
12	(Italy) Filippo Volandri	2	1

==== Fourth qualifier ====
First round
4	(Ukraine) Alexandr Dolgopolov	6	6
WC	(Spain) Adrián Menéndez Maceiras	2	3
WC	(Spain) Carlos Gómez-Herrera	2	2
8	(United States) Mardy Fish	6	6

Qualifying competition
4	(Ukraine) Alexandr Dolgopolov	6^{5}	6	7^{7}
8	(United States) Mardy Fish	7^{7}	4	6^{5}

==== Fifth qualifier ====
First round
5	(Colombia) Alejandro Falla	3	7	2
(Belgium) Christophe Rochus	6	5	6
(Spain) Gabriel Trujillo Soler	1	2
10	(Spain) Óscar Hernández	6	6

Qualifying competition
(Belgium) Christophe Rochus	6	6
10	(Spain) Óscar Hernández	4	3

==== Sixth qualifier ====
First round
6	(United States) Michael Russell	3	6	6
(Monaco) Benjamin Balleret	6	3	2
(France) Sébastien de Chaunac	2	2
9	(Spain) Daniel Gimeno Traver	6	6

Qualifying competition
6	(United States) Michael Russell	3	7^{10}	0^{r}
9	(Spain) Daniel Gimeno Traver	6	6^{8}	3

==== Seventh qualifier ====
First round
7	(South Africa) Kevin Anderson	6	6
WC	(Spain) Alvaro Cajigal	1	0
(Russia) Alex Bogomolov Jr.	4	4
11	(Spain) Iván Navarro	6	6

Qualifying competition
7	(South Africa) Kevin Anderson	6	6
11	(Spain) Iván Navarro	3	4
