= 2004 Internationaux de Strasbourg – Doubles =

Doubles
- 2004 Internationaux de Strasbourg

Final
- Champions: (Australia) Lisa McShea (Venezuela) Milagros Sequera
- Runners-up: (Slovenia) Tina Križan (Slovenia) Katarina Srebotnik
- Score: 6–4, 6–1

Events
| Singles | Doubles |
| ← 2003 · | Internationaux de Strasbourg | · 2005 → |

Sonya Jeyaseelan / Maja Matevžič were the defending champions.

== Seeds ==
1. (France) Marion Bartoli / (South Africa) Liezel Huber (quarterfinals)
2. (Slovakia) Henrieta Nagyová / (Thailand) Tamarine Tanasugarn (quarterfinals)
3. (Slovenia) Tina Križan / (Slovenia) Katarina Srebotnik (final)
4. (Australia) Lisa McShea / (Venezuela) Milagros Sequera (champions)

== Draw ==
=== Key ===
- Q = Qualifier
- WC = Wild card
- LL = Lucky loser
- Alt = Alternate
- SE = Special exempt
- PR = Protected ranking
- ITF = ITF entry
- JE = Junior exempt
- w/o = Walkover
- r = Retired
- d = Defaulted
- SR = Special ranking

First round
1 | (France) M Bartoli (South Africa) L Huber | 6 | 6
(Japan) A Morigami (Japan) S Obata | 1 | 1
WC | (France) S Beltrame (France) C Pin | 6 | 6
Q | (Switzerland) M-G Mikaelian (Ukraine) J Vakulenko | 2 | 3
3 | (Slovenia) T Križan (Slovenia) K Srebotnik | 6 | 6
(Puerto Rico) K Brandi (Spain) A Medina Garrigues | 3 | 3
(France) S Cohen-Aloro (France) S Testud | 6 | 6
(Ukraine) Y Beygelzimer (United States) S Reeves | 1 | 3
(Romania) R Dragomir Ilie (Argentina) L Montalvo | 3 | 7^{7} | 4
(United States) L Granville (Sweden) Å Svensson | 6 | 6^{4} | 6
(United States) J Craybas (Spain) C Martínez Granados | 0 | 3
4 | (Australia) L McShea (Venezuela) M Sequera | 6 | 6
(France) C Dhenin (Spain) A Parra Santonja | 6 | 6
(United States) J Russell (Italy) M Santangelo | 3 | 0
(Russia) M Kondratieva (France) S Lefèvre | 0 | 1
2 | (Slovakia) H Nagyová (Thailand) T Tanasugarn | 6 | 6

Quarterfinals
1 | (France) M Bartoli (South Africa) L Huber | 6^{6} | 4
WC | (France) S Beltrame (France) C Pin | 7^{8} | 6
3 | (Slovenia) T Križan (Slovenia) K Srebotnik | 6 | 6
(France) S Cohen-Aloro (France) S Testud | 3 | 4
(United States) L Granville (Sweden) Å Svensson | 0 | 1
4 | (Australia) L McShea (Venezuela) M Sequera | 6 | 6
(France) C Dhenin (Spain) A Parra Santonja | 6 | 1 | 7^{9}
2 | (Slovakia) H Nagyová (Thailand) T Tanasugarn | 4 | 6 | 6^{7}

Semifinals
WC | (France) S Beltrame (France) C Pin | 0 | 4
3 | (Slovenia) T Križan (Slovenia) K Srebotnik | 6 | 6
4 | (Australia) L McShea (Venezuela) M Sequera | 6 | 6
(France) C Dhenin (Spain) A Parra Santonja | 4 | 4

Final
3 | (Slovenia) T Križan (Slovenia) K Srebotnik | 4 | 1
4 | (Australia) L McShea (Venezuela) M Sequera | 6 | 6
