= 2003 Internationaux de Strasbourg – Singles =

Singles
- 2003 Internationaux de Strasbourg

Final
- Champion: (Italy) Silvia Farina Elia
- Runner-up: (Croatia) Karolina Šprem
- Score: 6–3, 4–6, 6–4

Details
- Seeds: 8

Events
| Singles | Doubles |
| ← 2002 · | Internationaux de Strasbourg | · 2004 → |

Silvia Farina Elia was the two-time defending champion, and successfully defended her title, defeating Karolina Šprem in the final, 6–3, 4–6, 6–4.

== Seeds ==
1. (Serbia and Montenegro) Jelena Dokić (second round)
2. (Russia) Anastasia Myskina (quarterfinals)
3. (Russia) Elena Dementieva (first round)
4. (Greece) Eleni Daniilidou (first round)
5. (Russia) Elena Bovina (first round)
6. (Russia) Vera Zvonareva (semifinals)
7. (Italy) Silvia Farina Elia (champion)
8. (Russia) Elena Likhovtseva (second round)

== Draw ==
=== Key ===
- Q = Qualifier
- WC = Wild card
- LL = Lucky loser
- Alt = Alternate
- SE = Special exempt
- PR = Protected ranking
- ITF = ITF entry
- JE = Junior exempt
- w/o = Walkover
- r = Retired
- d = Defaulted
- SR = Special ranking

=== Finals ===
Semifinals
Q | (Croatia) Karolina Šprem | 3 | 6 | 6
6 | (Russia) Vera Zvonareva | 6 | 3 | 4
(United States) Ashley Harkleroad | 6 | 3 | 5
7 | (Italy) Silvia Farina Elia | 2 | 6 | 7

Final
Q | (Croatia) Karolina Šprem | 3 | 6 | 4
7 | (Italy) Silvia Farina Elia | 6 | 4 | 6

=== Top half ===
First round
WC | (France) T Golovin | 4 | 6 | 4
Q | (Croatia) K Šprem | 6 | 1 | 6
Q | (Hungary) V Németh | 4 | 4
(United States) L Granville | 6 | 6
(Slovenia) M Matevžič | 6 | 6
5 | (Russia) E Bovina | 3 | 4
4 | (Greece) E Daniilidou | 3 | 6 | 3
(Russia) L Krasnoroutskaya | 6 | 3 | 6
(France) M Bartoli | 7^{7} | 6
WC | (France) C Beigbeder | 6^{3} | 1
(Slovenia) T Pisnik | 7 | 6
Q | (Croatia) J Kostanić | 5 | 0
(France) V Razzano | 0 | 4
6 | (Russia) V Zvonareva | 6 | 6

Second round
1 | (Serbia and Montenegro) J Dokić | 5 | 6 | 3
Q | (Croatia) K Šprem | 7 | 1 | 6
(United States) L Granville | 3 | 4
(Slovenia) M Matevžič | 6 | 6
(Russia) L Krasnoroutskaya | 6^{3} | 6 | 5
(France) M Bartoli | 7^{7} | 3 | 7
(Slovenia) T Pisnik | 1 | 0
6 | (Russia) V Zvonareva | 6 | 6

Quarterfinals
Q | (Croatia) K Šprem | 7^{7} | 3 | 6
(Slovenia) M Matevžič | 6^{0} | 6 | 2
(France) M Bartoli | 1 | 2
6 | (Russia) V Zvonareva | 6 | 6

Semifinals
Q | (Croatia) K Šprem | 3 | 6 | 6
6 | (Russia) V Zvonareva | 6 | 3 | 4

=== Bottom half ===
First round
8 | (Russia) E Likhovtseva | 7 | 6
PR | (South Africa) J Kruger | 5 | 4
(Belgium) E Callens | 2 | 5
(United States) A Harkleroad | 6 | 7
(Switzerland) M-G Mikaelian | 6 | 6^{3} | 6
Q | (Madagascar) D Randriantefy | 4 | 7^{7} | 4
(France) É Loit | 6 | 2 | 6
3 | (Russia) E Dementieva | 3 | 6 | 3
7 | (Italy) S Farina Elia | 6 | 6
(South Korea) Y-j Cho | 3 | 1
(Germany) A Barna | 6 | 6
(France) S Cohen-Aloro | 3 | 4
(Czech Republic) I Benešová | 6 | 1 | 5
PR | (United States) C Morariu | 3 | 6 | 7

Second round
8 | (Russia) E Likhovtseva | 3 | 0^{r}
(United States) A Harkleroad | 6 | 5
(Switzerland) M-G Mikaelian | 6 | 4 | 4
(France) É Loit | 4 | 6 | 6
7 | (Italy) S Farina Elia | 6 | 7
(Germany) A Barna | 3 | 5
PR | (United States) C Morariu | 3 | 6^{4}
2 | (Russia) A Myskina | 6 | 7^{7}

Quarterfinals
(United States) A Harkleroad | 6 | 6
(France) É Loit | 1 | 4
7 | (Italy) S Farina Elia | 6 | 6
2 | (Russia) A Myskina | 2 | 3

Semifinals
(United States) A Harkleroad | 6 | 3 | 5
7 | (Italy) S Farina Elia | 2 | 6 | 7
