= 2002 Internationaux de Strasbourg – Singles =

Singles
- 2002 Internationaux de Strasbourg

Final
- Champion: (Italy) Silvia Farina Elia
- Runner-up: (Federal Republic of Yugoslavia) Jelena Dokic
- Score: 6–4, 3–6, 6–3

Details
- Draw: 30 (2WC/4Q/1LL)
- Seeds: 8

Events
Singles	Doubles
← 2001 ·	Internationaux de Strasbourg	· 2003 →

Silvia Farina Elia was the defending champion and successfully defended her title, by defeating Jelena Dokic 6–4, 3–6, 6–3 in the final.

== Seeds ==
The first two seeds received a bye into the second round.

1. (Federal Republic of Yugoslavia) Jelena Dokic (final)
2. (Italy) Silvia Farina Elia (champion)
3. (United States) Meghann Shaughnessy (semifinals)
4. (Uzbekistan) Iroda Tulyaganova (first round)
5. (Bulgaria) Magdalena Maleeva (semifinals)
6. (United States) Lisa Raymond (quarterfinals)
7. (Czech Republic) Dája Bedáňová (first round)
8. (Switzerland) Emmanuelle Gagliardi (quarterfinals)

== Draw ==
=== Key ===
- Q = Qualifier
- WC = Wild card
- LL = Lucky loser
- Alt = Alternate
- ITF = ITF entry
- PR = Protected ranking
- SR = Special ranking
- SE = Special exempt
- JE = Junior exempt
- JR = Junior Accelerator Programme entrant
- CO = College Accelerator Programme entrant
- NG = Next Gen Accelerator Program entrant
- w/o = Walkover
- r = Retired
- d = Defaulted

=== Finals ===
Semifinals
1	(Federal Republic of Yugoslavia) Jelena Dokic	6	6
3	(United States) Meghann Shaughnessy	1	2
5	(Bulgaria) Magdalena Maleeva	3	1
2	(Italy) Silvia Farina Elia	6	6

Final
1	(Federal Republic of Yugoslavia) Jelena Dokic	4	6	3
2	(Italy) Silvia Farina Elia	6	3	6

=== Top half ===
First round
(United States) L Osterloh	4	2
(Slovenia) T Pisnik	6	6
(Germany) M Müller	3	2
Q	(Germany) V Henke	6	6
(Croatia) J Kostanić	4	7	6
7	(Czech Republic) D Bedáňová	6	5	4
3	(United States) M Shaughnessy	7	6
(United States) J Hopkins	5	0
(France) V Razzano	6^{6}	1
(Germany) A Barna	7^{8}	6
(Slovenia) M Matevžič	2	3
Q	(Czech Republic) Z Ondrášková	6	6
Q	(Indonesia) A Widjaja	2	1
8	(Switzerland) E Gagliardi	6	6

Second round
1	(Federal Republic of Yugoslavia) J Dokic	6	7
(Slovenia) T Pisnik	4	5
Q	(Germany) V Henke	4	5
(Croatia) J Kostanić	6	7
3	(United States) M Shaughnessy	6	6
(Germany) A Barna	4	1
Q	(Czech Republic) Z Ondrášková	2	3
8	(Switzerland) E Gagliardi	6	6

Quarterfinals
1	(Federal Republic of Yugoslavia) J Dokic	4	6	6
(Croatia) J Kostanić	6	4	3
3	(United States) M Shaughnessy	2	6	6
8	(Switzerland) E Gagliardi	6	4	3

Semifinals
1	(Federal Republic of Yugoslavia) J Dokic	6	6
3	(United States) M Shaughnessy	1	2

=== Bottom half ===
First round
5	(Bulgaria) M Maleeva	6	3	7
(Switzerland) MG Mikaelian	2	6	5
WC	(France) S Foretz	7^{7}	7^{7}
LL	(United States) L Granville	6^{3}	6^{5}
(Austria) B Schwartz	7^{7}	6
(Italy) Ad Serra Zanetti	6^{0}	3
(Greece) E Daniilidou	6^{3}	7	7
4	(Uzbekistan) I Tulyaganova	7^{7}	5	5
6	(United States) L Raymond	4	7^{9}	6
WC	(France) C Beigbeder	6	6^{7}	3
(Hungary) P Mandula	7^{7}	6
(Russia) A Kournikova	6^{5}	2
Q	(United States) S Taylor	6	6
(United Kingdom) J Pullin	1	3

Second round
5	(Bulgaria) M Maleeva	6	6
WC	(France) S Foretz	3	4
(Austria) B Schwartz	6	6
(Greece) E Daniilidou	2	2
6	(United States) L Raymond	2	6	6
(Hungary) P Mandula	6	0	2
Q	(United States) S Taylor	5	1
2	(Italy) S Farina Elia	7	6

Quarterfinals
5	(Bulgaria) M Maleeva	6	2	6
(Austria) B Schwartz	4	6	2
6	(United States) L Raymond	4	0
2	(Italy) S Farina Elia	6	6

Semifinals
5	(Bulgaria) M Maleeva	3	1
2	(Italy) S Farina Elia	6	6
