= 2005 Internationaux de Strasbourg – Singles =

Singles
- 2005 Internationaux de Strasbourg

Final
- Champion: (Spain) Anabel Medina Garrigues
- Runner-up: (Poland) Marta Domachowska
- Score: 6–4, 6–3

Details
- Seeds: 8

Events
| Singles | Doubles |
| ← 2004 · | Internationaux de Strasbourg | · 2006 → |

Claudine Schaul was the defending champion, but lost in the first round to Amy Frazier.

Anabel Medina Garrigues won the title, defeating Marta Domachowska in the final 6–4, 6–3.

== Seeds ==
1. (France) Nathalie Dechy (semifinals)
2. (France) Tatiana Golovin (second round)
3. (Italy) Silvia Farina Elia (first round)
4. (Japan) Shinobu Asagoe (first round)
5. (Japan) Ai Sugiyama (second round)
6. (Croatia) Karolina Šprem (quarterfinals)
7. (United States) Amy Frazier (second round)
8. (Argentina) Paola Suárez (second round)

== Draw ==
=== Key ===
- Q = Qualifier
- WC = Wild card
- LL = Lucky loser
- Alt = Alternate
- SE = Special exempt
- PR = Protected ranking
- ITF = ITF entry
- JE = Junior exempt
- w/o = Walkover
- r = Retired
- d = Defaulted
- SR = Special ranking

=== Finals ===
Semifinals
1/WC | (France) Nathalie Dechy | 4 | 1
(Spain) Anabel Medina Garrigues | 6 | 6
(Madagascar) Dally Randriantefy | 3 | 3
(Poland) Marta Domachowska | 6 | 6

Final
(Spain) Anabel Medina Garrigues | 6 | 6
(Poland) Marta Domachowska | 4 | 3

=== Top half ===
First round
Q | (United States) S Rao | 1 | 4
(Czech Republic) I Benešová | 6 | 6
WC | (France) S Cohen-Aloro | 6 | 7
Q | (Slovakia) K Kachlíková | 3 | 6^{1}
(France) V Razzano | 1 | 6^{1}
8 | (Argentina) P Suárez | 6 | 7
4 | (Japan) S Asagoe | 2 | 4
(Russia) V Douchevina | 6 | 6
(Germany) M Weingärtner | 6 | 5 | 2
(France) É Loit | 3 | 7 | 6
(Spain) A Medina Garrigues | 7 | 6
(Australia) S Stosur | 6^{3} | 1
WC | (Luxembourg) C Schaul | 3 | 3
7 | (United States) A Frazier | 6 | 6

Second round
1/WC | (France) N Dechy | 6 | 6
(Czech Republic) I Benešová | 3 | 2
WC | (France) S Cohen-Aloro | w/o
8 | (Argentina) P Suárez
(Russia) V Douchevina | 6 | 6
(France) É Loit | 3 | 1
(Spain) A Medina Garrigues | 4 | 6 | 6
7 | (United States) A Frazier | 6 | 3 | 2

Quarterfinals
1/WC | (France) N Dechy | 6 | 3 | 6
WC | (France) S Cohen-Aloro | 3 | 6 | 3
(Russia) V Douchevina | 7 | 5 | 1
(Spain) A Medina Garrigues | 6^{2} | 7 | 6

Semifinals
1/WC | (France) N Dechy | 4 | 1
(Spain) A Medina Garrigues | 6 | 6

=== Bottom half ===
First round
6 | (Croatia) K Šprem | 7 | 5 | 7
(Slovakia) M Suchá | 5 | 7 | 5
(China) J Zheng | 6 | 6
PR | (United States) C Rubin | 4 | 2
(Slovenia) K Srebotnik | 5 | 4
LL | (Ukraine) J Vakulenko | 7 | 6
(Madagascar) D Randriantefy | 6 | 7
3 | (Italy) S Farina Elia | 2 | 5
5 | (Japan) A Sugiyama | 6 | 6
Q | (Czech Republic) H Šromová | 3 | 2
Q | (Argentina) N Gussoni | 1 | 6 | 3
(Poland) M Domachowska | 6 | 4 | 6
(Thailand) T Tanasugarn | 3 | 0
(China) S Peng | 6 | 6

Second round
6 | (Croatia) K Šprem | 6 | 6
(China) J Zheng | 4 | 3
LL | (Ukraine) J Vakulenko | 3 | 4
(Madagascar) D Randriantefy | 6 | 6
5 | (Japan) A Sugiyama | 2 | 7 | 5
(Poland) M Domachowska | 6 | 6^{2} | 7
(China) S Peng | 6 | 3 | 7
2 | (France) T Golovin | 4 | 6 | 5

Quarterfinals
6 | (Croatia) K Šprem | 4 | 6 | 4
(Madagascar) D Randriantefy | 6 | 4 | 6
(Poland) M Domachowska | 4 | 7 | 6
(China) S Peng | 6 | 5 | 2

Semifinals
(Madagascar) D Randriantefy | 3 | 3
(Poland) M Domachowska | 6 | 6
