= 2005 Internationaux de Strasbourg =

- Date: 16–21 May
- Edition: 19th
- Category: Tier III
- Draw: 30S / 16D
- Prize money: $170,000
- Surface: Clay / outdoor
- Location: Strasbourg, France
- Venue: Centre Sportif de Hautepierre

Champions

Singles
- (Spain) Anabel Medina Garrigues

Doubles
- (Spain) Rosa María Andrés / (Romania) Andreea Ehritt-Vanc
- Internationaux de Strasbourg

The 2005 Internationaux de Strasbourg was a women's tennis tournament played on outdoor clay courts. It was the 19th edition of the Internationaux de Strasbourg, and was part of the Tier III of the 2005 WTA Tour. The tournament took place at the Centre Sportif de Hautepierre in Strasbourg, France, from 16 May until 21 May 2005. Unseeded Anabel Medina Garrigues won the singles title and earned $27,000 first-prize money.

== Finals ==
=== Singles ===
(Spain) Anabel Medina Garrigues defeated (Poland) Marta Domachowska, 6–4, 6–3

=== Doubles ===
(Spain) Rosa María Andrés / (Romania) Andreea Ehritt-Vanc defeated (Poland) Marta Domachowska / (Germany) Marlene Weingärtner, 6–3, 6–1
