= 2010 French Open – Women's singles =

Women's singles
- 2010 French Open

Final
- Champion: (Italy) Francesca Schiavone
- Runner-up: (Australia) Samantha Stosur
- Score: 6–4, 7–6^{(7–2)}

Events
Singles	men	women		boys	girls
Doubles	men	women	mixed	boys	girls
WC Singles	men	women	quad
WC Doubles	men	women	quad
Legends	−45	45+	women
← 2009 ·	French Open	· 2011 →

Francesca Schiavone defeated Samantha Stosur in the final, 6–4, 7–6^{(7–2)} to win the women's singles tennis title at the 2010 French Open. It was her first and only major singles title, becoming the first Italian woman to win a singles major. Schiavone was the first woman in the Open Era to win the title without being a top-10 seed. The final was also a rematch of the pair's first-round match from the previous year. With the win, Schiavone made her top 10 debut in the rankings. She remains the last woman with a one-handed backhand to win a singles major.

Svetlana Kuznetsova was the defending champion, but lost in the third round to Maria Kirilenko.

With the loss of Serena Williams in the quarterfinals, a first-time major champion was guaranteed. This was the first major since the 1979 Australian Open where none of the semifinalists had previously won a major title, and the final was the first since the 2004 tournament to feature two first-time major finalists.

This tournament marked the last French Open appearance of four-time champion Justine Henin, who was defeated by Stosur in the fourth round. It was also the major debut of future world No. 1 and two-time major champion Simona Halep, who was defeated by Stosur in the first round.

== Seeds ==
1. (United States) Serena Williams (quarterfinals)
2. (United States) Venus Williams (fourth round)
3. (Denmark) Caroline Wozniacki (quarterfinals)
4. (Serbia) Jelena Janković (semifinals)
5. (Russia) Elena Dementieva (semifinals, retired because of left gastrocnemius muscle strain)
6. (Russia) Svetlana Kuznetsova (third round)
7. (Australia) Samantha Stosur (final)
8. (Poland) Agnieszka Radwańska (second round)
9. (Russia) Dinara Safina (first round)
10. (Belarus) Victoria Azarenka (first round)
11. (China) Li Na (third round)
12. (Russia) Maria Sharapova (third round)
13. (France) Marion Bartoli (third round)
14. (Italy) Flavia Pennetta (fourth round)
15. (France) Aravane Rezaï (third round)
16. (Belgium) Yanina Wickmayer (third round)
17. (Italy) Francesca Schiavone (champion)
18. (Israel) Shahar Pe'er (fourth round)
19. (Russia) Nadia Petrova (quarterfinals)
20. (Spain) María José Martínez Sánchez (first round)
21. (Russia) Vera Zvonareva (second round)
22. (Belgium) Justine Henin (fourth round)
23. (Slovakia) Daniela Hantuchová (fourth round)
24. (Czech Republic) Lucie Šafářová (second round)
25. (China) Zheng Jie (second round)
26. (Slovakia) Dominika Cibulková (third round)
27. (Ukraine) Alona Bondarenko (third round)
28. (Russia) Alisa Kleybanova (third round)
29. (Russia) Anastasia Pavlyuchenkova (third round)
30. (Russia) Maria Kirilenko (fourth round)
31. (Romania) Alexandra Dulgheru (third round)
32. (Ukraine) Kateryna Bondarenko (second round)

Click on the seed number of a player to go to their draw section.

== Draw ==
=== Key ===
- Q = Qualifier
- WC = Wild card
- LL = Lucky loser
- Alt = Alternate
- ITF = ITF entry
- PR = Protected ranking
- SR = Special ranking
- SE = Special exempt
- JE = Junior exempt
- JR = Junior Accelerator Programme entrant
- CO = College Accelerator Programme entrant
- NG = Next Gen Accelerator Program entrant
- w/o = Walkover
- r = Retired
- d = Defaulted

=== Finals ===
Quarterfinals
1	(United States) Serena Williams	2	7^{7}	6
7	(Australia) Samantha Stosur	6	6^{2}	8
4	(Serbia) Jelena Janković	7	6
(Kazakhstan) Yaroslava Shvedova	5	4
17	(Italy) Francesca Schiavone	6	6
3	(Denmark) Caroline Wozniacki	2	3
5	(Russia) Elena Dementieva	2	6	6
19	(Russia) Nadia Petrova	6	2	0

Semifinals
7	(Australia) Samantha Stosur	6	6
4	(Serbia) Jelena Janković	1	2
17	(Italy) Francesca Schiavone	7^{7}	0
5	(Russia) Elena Dementieva	6^{3}	0^{r}

Final
7	(Australia) Samantha Stosur	4	6^{2}
17	(Italy) Francesca Schiavone	6	7^{7}

=== Top half ===
==== Section 1 ====
First round
1	(United States) S Williams	7^{7}	6
(Switzerland) S Vögele	6^{2}	2
(Hungary) M Czink	2	3
(Germany) J Görges	6	6
(United Kingdom) K O'Brien	0	6	2
(United States) J Craybas	6	4	6
(France) A Cornet	4	2
29	(Russia) A Pavlyuchenkova	6	6
18	(Israel) S Pe'er	6	6
Q	(Spain) N Llagostera Vives	1	4
(United States) V King	2	2
LL	(United States) B Mattek-Sands	6	6
(United States) S Perry	6^{4}	0
WC	(France) O Sanchez	7^{7}	6
(Italy) ME Camerin	2	3
13	(France) M Bartoli	6	6

Second round
1	(United States) S Williams	6	6
(Germany) J Görges	1	1
(United States) J Craybas	4	1
29	(Russia) A Pavlyuchenkova	6	6
18	(Israel) S Pe'er	3	6	6
LL	(United States) B Mattek-Sands	6	0	1
WC	(France) O Sanchez	5	2
13	(France) M Bartoli	7	6

Third round
1	(United States) S Williams	6	1	6
29	(Russia) A Pavlyuchenkova	1	6	2
18	(Israel) S Pe'er	7^{9}	6
13	(France) M Bartoli	6^{7}	2

Fourth round
1	(United States) S Williams	6	6
18	(Israel) S Pe'er	2	2

==== Section 2 ====
First round
12	(Russia) M Sharapova	6	6
Q	(Russia) K Pervak	3	2
(Japan) A Morita	1	4
(Belgium) K Flipkens	6	6
(Czech Republic) K Zakopalová	7^{7}	4	6
PR	(Slovenia) K Srebotnik	6^{3}	6	2
(Bulgaria) T Pironkova	4	3
22	(Belgium) J Henin	6	6
25	(China) J Zheng	7	6
(Russia) E Bychkova	5	4
Q	(Russia) A Pivovarova	6	6
(Romania) R Olaru	4	3
(Czech Republic) B Záhlavová-Strýcová	6^{2}	3
(Paraguay) R de los Ríos	7^{7}	6
Q	(Romania) S Halep	5	1
7	(Australia) S Stosur	7	6

Second round
12	(Russia) M Sharapova	6	6
(Belgium) K Flipkens	3	3
(Czech Republic) K Zakopalová	3	3
22	(Belgium) J Henin	6	6
25	(China) J Zheng	4	3
Q	(Russia) A Pivovarova	6	6
(Paraguay) R de los Ríos	6	1	0
7	(Australia) S Stosur	4	6	6

Third round
12	(Russia) M Sharapova	2	6	3
22	(Belgium) J Henin	6	3	6
Q	(Russia) A Pivovarova	3	2
7	(Australia) S Stosur	6	6

Fourth round
22	(Belgium) J Henin	6	1	4
7	(Australia) S Stosur	2	6	6

==== Section 3 ====
First round
4	(Serbia) J Janković	6	6
(Australia) A Molik	0	4
Q	(Estonia) K Kanepi	6	6
(France) P Parmentier	3	1
(Sweden) S Arvidsson	7^{7}	3	2
(Slovakia) M Rybáriková	6^{2}	6	6
(Russia) V Dushevina	7^{7}	3	4
27	(Ukraine) A Bondarenko	6^{3}	6	6
23	(Slovakia) D Hantuchová	6	6
(Thailand) T Tanasugarn	1	1
(Belarus) O Govortsova	7^{11}	6
(Spain) C Suárez Navarro	6^{9}	1
(Colombia) M Duque Mariño	0	1
(Austria) S Bammer	6	6
(Czech Republic) S Záhlavová	1	1
16	(Belgium) Y Wickmayer	6	6

Second round
4	(Serbia) J Janković	6	3	6
Q	(Estonia) K Kanepi	2	6	4
(Slovakia) M Rybáriková	3	3
27	(Ukraine) A Bondarenko	6	6
23	(Slovakia) D Hantuchová	7	6
(Belarus) O Govortsova	5	3
(Austria) S Bammer	6^{4}	6	5
16	(Belgium) Y Wickmayer	7^{7}	1	7

Third round
4	(Serbia) J Janković	6	7^{7}
27	(Ukraine) A Bondarenko	4	6^{3}
23	(Slovakia) D Hantuchová	7	6
16	(Belgium) Y Wickmayer	5	3

Fourth round
4	(Serbia) J Janković	6	6
23	(Slovakia) D Hantuchová	4	2

==== Section 4 ====
First round
9	(Russia) D Safina	6	4	5
(Japan) K Date-Krumm	3	6	7
WC	(Australia) J Groth	6	6
(Chinese Taipei) Y-j Chan	2	3
(Australia) A Rodionova	6	6
(Russia) E Makarova	3	2
(Italy) A Brianti	3	1
21	(Russia) V Zvonareva	6	6
28	(Russia) A Kleybanova	6	6
(Ukraine) M Koryttseva	2	1
(Chinese Taipei) K-c Chang	3	3
(Serbia) A Ivanovic	6	6
(Italy) S Errani	1	5
(Kazakhstan) Y Shvedova	6	7
(United Kingdom) E Baltacha	0	5
8	(Poland) A Radwańska	6	7

Second round
(Japan) K Date-Krumm	0	3
WC	(Australia) J Groth	6	6
(Australia) A Rodionova	6	6
21	(Russia) V Zvonareva	4	4
28	(Russia) A Kleybanova	6	6
(Serbia) A Ivanovic	3	0
(Kazakhstan) Y Shvedova	7	6
8	(Poland) A Radwańska	5	3

Third round
WC	(Australia) J Groth	6	5	6
(Australia) A Rodionova	3	7	2
28	(Russia) A Kleybanova	2	6	0
(Kazakhstan) Y Shvedova	6	4	6

Fourth round
WC	(Australia) J Groth	4	3
(Kazakhstan) Y Shvedova	6	6

=== Bottom half ===
==== Section 5 ====
First round
6	(Russia) S Kuznetsova	6	6
(Romania) S Cîrstea	3	1
(Russia) E Vesnina	6	1	4
(Germany) A Petkovic	4	6	6
(Austria) Y Meusburger	7^{7}	6
WC	(France) C Feuerstein	6^{4}	3
(Croatia) K Šprem	6^{5}	4
30	(Russia) M Kirilenko	7^{7}	6
17	(Italy) F Schiavone	5	6	6
(Russia) R Kulikova	7	3	4
(Czech Republic) P Kvitová	6	2	2
Q	(Australia) S Ferguson	1	6	6
(Canada) S Dubois	7^{7}	1	3
WC	(France) S Cohen-Aloro	6^{3}	6	6
WC	(France) K Mladenovic	5	3
11	(China) N Li	7	6

Second round
6	(Russia) S Kuznetsova	4	7	6
(Germany) A Petkovic	6	5	4
(Austria) Y Meusburger	3	3
30	(Russia) M Kirilenko	6	6
17	(Italy) F Schiavone	6	6
Q	(Australia) S Ferguson	2	2
WC	(France) S Cohen-Aloro	2	2
11	(China) N Li	6	6

Third round
6	(Russia) S Kuznetsova	3	6	4
30	(Russia) M Kirilenko	6	2	6
17	(Italy) F Schiavone	6	6
11	(China) N Li	4	2

Fourth round
30	(Russia) M Kirilenko	4	4
17	(Italy) F Schiavone	6	6

==== Section 6 ====
First round
14	(Italy) F Pennetta	6	6
(United Kingdom) A Keothavong	2	2
(Italy) R Vinci	7	6
(France) V Razzano	5	2
Q	(Japan) M Doi	3	0
(Slovenia) P Hercog	6	6
(Australia) J Dokić	2	2
24	(Czech Republic) L Šafářová	6	6
31	(Romania) A Dulgheru	7^{7}	4	6
(Czech Republic) L Hradecká	6^{1}	6	3
(Switzerland) T Bacsinszky	6	6
(Germany) T Malek	2	3
(Germany) K Barrois	6	6^{7}	3
(Italy) T Garbin	1	7^{9}	6
(Russia) A Kudryavtseva	0	3
3	(Denmark) C Wozniacki	6	6

Second round
14	(Italy) F Pennetta	6	6
(Italy) R Vinci	1	1
(Slovenia) P Hercog	6	6
24	(Czech Republic) L Šafářová	1	2
31	(Romania) A Dulgheru	6	6
(Switzerland) T Bacsinszky	4	2
(Italy) T Garbin	3	1
3	(Denmark) C Wozniacki	6	6

Third round
14	(Italy) F Pennetta	6	6
(Slovenia) P Hercog	3	0
31	(Romania) A Dulgheru	3	4
3	(Denmark) C Wozniacki	6	6

Fourth round
14	(Italy) F Pennetta	6^{5}	7^{7}	2
3	(Denmark) C Wozniacki	7^{7}	6^{4}	6

==== Section 7 ====
First round
5	(Russia) E Dementieva	6	6
(Croatia) P Martić	1	1
(United States) M Oudin	5	2
(Spain) A Medina Garrigues	7	6
(Canada) A Wozniak	6	6
(Czech Republic) I Benešová	3	3
(France) J Coin	1	2
32	(Ukraine) K Bondarenko	6	6
20	(Spain) MJ Martínez Sánchez	2	4
(Uzbekistan) A Amanmuradova	6	6
(Sweden) J Larsson	6	6
(Latvia) A Sevastova	2	2
WC	(France) M Johansson	2	4
Q	(South Africa) C Scheepers	6	6
(Argentina) G Dulko	6	6
10	(Belarus) V Azarenka	1	2

Second round
5	(Russia) E Dementieva	6	7^{7}
(Spain) A Medina Garrigues	2	6^{3}
(Canada) A Wozniak	6	6
32	(Ukraine) K Bondarenko	4	1
(Uzbekistan) A Amanmuradova	7^{7}	6
(Sweden) J Larsson	6^{2}	2
Q	(South Africa) C Scheepers	3	6	6
(Argentina) G Dulko	6	3	4

Third round
5	(Russia) E Dementieva	6^{2}	6	6
(Canada) A Wozniak	7^{7}	3	4
(Uzbekistan) A Amanmuradova	3	3
Q	(South Africa) C Scheepers	6	6

Fourth round
5	(Russia) E Dementieva	6	6
Q	(South Africa) C Scheepers	1	3

==== Section 8 ====
First round
15	(France) A Rezaï	6	6
Q	(Canada) H El Tabakh	1	1
(Russia) A Chakvetadze	7	6^{2}	4
(Germany) A Kerber	5	7^{7}	6
(Hungary) Á Szávay	6	6
WC	(France) S Foretz	2	2
Q	(China) S Zhang	0	3
19	(Russia) N Petrova	6	6
26	(Slovakia) D Cibulková	6	6
Q	(Russia) E Ivanova	2	0
WC	(United States) C McHale	5	3
(United States) V Lepchenko	7	6
(Spain) A Parra Santonja	6	6
Q	(Japan) K Nara	2	2
(Switzerland) P Schnyder	3	3
2	(United States) V Williams	6	6

Second round
15	(France) A Rezaï	6	2	6
(Germany) A Kerber	2	6	3
(Hungary) Á Szávay	1	2
19	(Russia) N Petrova	6	6
26	(Slovakia) D Cibulková	4	6	6
(United States) V Lepchenko	6	2	0
(Spain) A Parra Santonja	2	4
2	(United States) V Williams	6	6

Third round
15	(France) A Rezaï	7^{7}	4	8
19	(Russia) N Petrova	6^{2}	6	10
26	(Slovakia) D Cibulková	3	4
2	(United States) V Williams	6	6

Fourth round
19	(Russia) N Petrova	6	6
2	(United States) V Williams	4	3

== Championship match statistics ==
Category	(Italy) Schiavone	(Australia) Stosur
1st serve %	46/71 (65%)	42/65 (65%)
1st serve points won	35 of 46 = 76%	30 of 42 = 71%
2nd serve points won	15 of 25 = 60%	13 of 23 = 57%
Total service points won	50 of 71 = 70.42%	43 of 65 = 66.15%
Aces	6	3
Double faults	1	1
Winners	26	25
Unforced errors	19	28
Net points won	12 of 12 = 100%	8 of 17 = 47%
Break points converted	2 of 7 = 29%	1 of 2 = 50%
Return points won	22 of 65 = 34%	21 of 71 = 30%
Total points won	72	64
