= 2002 Internationaux de Strasbourg =

- Date: 20–25 May
- Edition: 16th
- Category: WTA Tier III
- Draw: 30S / 16D
- Prize money: $170,000
- Surface: Clay
- Location: Strasbourg, France
- Venue: Centre Sportif de Hautepierre

Champions

Singles
- (Italy) Silvia Farina Elia

Doubles
- (United States) Jennifer Hopkins / (Croatia) Jelena Kostanić
- Internationaux de Strasbourg

The 2002 Internationaux de Strasbourg was a women's tennis tournament played on outdoor clay courts. It was the 16th edition of the Internationaux de Strasbourg, and was part of the Tier III Series of the 2002 WTA Tour. The tournament took place at the Centre Sportif de Hautepierre in Strasbourg, France, from 20 May until 25 May 2002. Second-seeded Silvia Farina Elia won her second consecutive singles title at the event and earned $27,000 first-prize money.

== Finals ==
=== Singles ===
(Italy) Silvia Farina Elia defeated (Federal Republic of Yugoslavia) Jelena Dokić 6–4, 3–6, 6–3

- It was Farina Elia's 1st singles title of the year and the 2nd of her career.

=== Doubles ===
(United States) Jennifer Hopkins / (Croatia) Jelena Kostanić defeated (France) Caroline Dhenin / (Slovenia) Maja Matevžič 0–6, 6–4, 6–4
