= 2003 Internationaux de Strasbourg =

- Date: 19 – 24 May
- Edition: 17st
- Category: WTA Tier III
- Draw: 30S / 16D
- Prize money: $170,000
- Surface: Clay
- Location: Strasbourg, France
- Venue: Centre Sportif de Hautepierre

Champions

Singles
- (Italy) Silvia Farina Elia

Doubles
- (Canada) Sonya Jeyaseelan / (Croatia) Maja Matevžič
- Internationaux de Strasbourg

The 2003 Internationaux de Strasbourg was a women's tennis tournament played on outdoor clay courts. It was the 17st edition of the Internationaux de Strasbourg, and was part of the Tier III Series of the 2003 WTA Tour. The tournament took place at the Centre Sportif de Hautepierre in Strasbourg, France, from 19 May until 24 May 2003. Seventh-seeded Silvia Farina Elia won her third consecutive singles title at the event and earned $27,000 first-prize money.

== Finals ==
=== Singles ===
(Italy) Silvia Farina Elia defeated (Croatia) Karolina Šprem 6–3, 4–6, 6–4

- It was Farina Elia's only singles title of the year and the 3rd and last of her career.

=== Doubles ===
(Canada) Sonya Jeyaseelan / (Croatia) Maja Matevžič defeated (United States) Laura Granville / (Croatia) Jelena Kostanić 6–4, 6–4
