= 2003 Internationaux de Strasbourg – Doubles =

Doubles
- 2003 Internationaux de Strasbourg

Final
- Champions: (Canada) Sonya Jeyaseelan (Slovenia) Maja Matevžič
- Runners-up: (United States) Laura Granville (Croatia) Jelena Kostanić
- Score: 6–4, 6–4

Events
| Singles | Doubles |
| ← 2002 · | Internationaux de Strasbourg | · 2004 → |

Jennifer Hopkins and Jelena Kostanić were the defending champions. Hopkins did not compete.

Sonya Jeyaseelan and Maja Matevžič won the title, defeating Laura Granville and Jelena Kostanić in the final, 6–4, 6–4.

== Seeds ==
1. (Russia) Elena Bovina / (Australia) Rennae Stubbs (quarterfinals)
2. (Greece) Eleni Daniilidou / (United States) Corina Morariu (first round)
3. (France) Marion Bartoli / (France) Caroline Dhenin (quarterfinals)
4. (Russia) Elena Likhovtseva / (Russia) Anastasia Myskina (quarterfinals)

== Draw ==
=== Key ===
- Q = Qualifier
- WC = Wild card
- LL = Lucky loser
- Alt = Alternate
- SE = Special exempt
- PR = Protected ranking
- ITF = ITF entry
- JE = Junior exempt
- w/o = Walkover
- r = Retired
- d = Defaulted
- SR = Special ranking

First round
1 | (Russia) E Bovina (Australia) R Stubbs | 3 | 6 | 6
WC | (France) T Golovin (France) V Razzano | 6 | 3 | 2
(Australia) C Barclay (Australia) E Dominikovic | 6^{4} | 1
(United States) L Granville (Croatia) J Kostanić | 7^{7} | 6
3 | (France) M Bartoli (France) C Dhenin | 6 | 6
(United States) A Harkleroad (United States) M Irvin | 3 | 4
(China) T Li (China) T Sun | 2 | 6 | 2
Q | (Russia) L Krasnoroutskaya (Russia) V Zvonareva | 6 | 2 | 6
(South Africa) J Kruger (Germany) M Müller | 4 | 3
(Canada) S Jeyaseelan (Slovenia) M Matevžič | 6 | 6
(South Africa) K Grant (Australia) B Stewart | 0 | 4
4 | (Russia) E Likhovtseva (Russia) A Myskina | 6 | 6
(Germany) K Freye (Serbia and Montenegro) D Zarić | 6^{2} | 6^{6}
(Australia) L McShea (Kazakhstan) I Selyutina | 7^{7} | 7^{8}
(France) S Cohen-Aloro (France) N Tauziat | 6 | 6
2 | (Greece) E Daniilidou (United States) C Morariu | 1 | 2

Quarterfinals
1 | (Russia) E Bovina (Australia) R Stubbs | 6 | 5 | 2
(United States) L Granville (Croatia) J Kostanić | 2 | 7 | 6
3 | (France) M Bartoli (France) C Dhenin | 1 | 6 | 4
Q | (Russia) L Krasnoroutskaya (Russia) V Zvonareva | 6 | 4 | 6
(Canada) S Jeyaseelan (Slovenia) M Matevžič | 6 | 7
4 | (Russia) E Likhovtseva (Russia) A Myskina | 3 | 5
(Australia) L McShea (Kazakhstan) I Selyutina | 0 | 6 | 6
(France) S Cohen-Aloro (France) N Tauziat | 6 | 2 | 1

Semifinals
(United States) L Granville (Croatia) J Kostanić | 6 | 6
Q | (Russia) L Krasnoroutskaya (Russia) V Zvonareva | 1 | 4
(Canada) S Jeyaseelan (Slovenia) M Matevžič | 6 | 6
(Australia) L McShea (Kazakhstan) I Selyutina | 4 | 1

Final
(United States) L Granville (Croatia) J Kostanić | 4 | 4
(Canada) S Jeyaseelan (Slovenia) M Matevžič | 6 | 6
