= 2004 Internationaux de Strasbourg – Singles =

Singles
- 2004 Internationaux de Strasbourg

Final
- Champion: (Luxembourg) Claudine Schaul
- Runner-up: (United States) Lindsay Davenport
- Score: 2–6, 6–0, 6–3

Details
- Seeds: 8

Events
Singles	Doubles
← 2003 ·	Internationaux de Strasbourg	· 2005 →

Silvia Farina Elia was the defending champion, but lost in the semifinals to Lindsay Davenport. Claudine Schaul won her first WTA singles title, defeating Davenport in the final 2–6, 6–0, 6–3.

It was Schaul's only singles title on the WTA tour.

== Seeds ==
1. (United States) Lindsay Davenport (final)
2. (Japan) Ai Sugiyama (quarterfinals)
3. (Italy) Silvia Farina Elia (semifinals)
4. (France) Émilie Loit (semifinals)
5. (Slovenia) Tina Pisnik (second round)
6. (Russia) Dinara Safina (first round)
7. (Spain) María Sánchez Lorenzo (first round)
8. (United States) Meghann Shaughnessy (first round)

== Draw ==
=== Key ===
- Q = Qualifier
- WC = Wild card
- LL = Lucky loser
- Alt = Alternate
- SE = Special exempt
- PR = Protected ranking
- ITF = ITF entry
- JE = Junior exempt
- w/o = Walkover
- r = Retired
- d = Defaulted
- SR = Special ranking

=== Finals ===
Semifinals
1	(United States) Lindsay Davenport	6	6
3	(Italy) Silvia Farina Elia	2	0
4	(France) Émilie Loit	4	1
(Luxembourg) Claudine Schaul	6	6

Final
1	(United States) Lindsay Davenport	6	0	3
(Luxembourg) Claudine Schaul	2	6	6

=== Top half ===
First round
(Austria) B Schett	3	6	4
(France) M Bartoli	6	2	6
(Japan) S Obata	3	4
(Slovenia) K Srebotnik	6	6
(Ukraine) J Vakulenko	6	7
8	(United States) M Shaughnessy	2	5
3	(Italy) S Farina Elia	6	6
Q	(Slovakia) H Nagyová	3	2
(Spain) A Medina Garrigues	6	4	6
(Switzerland) M-G Mikaelian	2	6	4
(United States) L Granville	6	7^{7}
(Puerto Rico) K Brandi	1	6^{5}
Q	(Venezuela) M Sequera	2	6	7
6	(Russia) D Safina	6	2	5

Second round
1	(United States) L Davenport	7^{7}	7
(France) M Bartoli	6^{5}	5
(Slovenia) K Srebotnik	6	6
(Ukraine) J Vakulenko	0	0
3	(Italy) S Farina Elia	6	3	6
(Spain) A Medina Garrigues	0	6	4
(United States) L Granville	3	2
Q	(Venezuela) M Sequera	6	6

Quarterfinals
1	(United States) L Davenport	6	6
(Slovenia) K Srebotnik	0	1
3	(Italy) S Farina Elia	4	6	6
Q	(Venezuela) M Sequera	6	0	2

Semifinals
1	(United States) L Davenport	6	6
3	(Italy) S Farina Elia	2	0

=== Bottom half ===
First round
7	(Spain) M Sánchez Lorenzo	7^{7}	4	1
(France) S Beltrame	6^{6}	6	6
(Thailand) T Tanasugarn	2	7^{7}	3
(Czech Republic) B Strýcová	6	6^{5}	6
(United States) J Craybas	1	6	3
Q	(France) S Cohen-Aloro	6	4	6
WC	(France) S Testud	4	7^{13}	1
4	(France) É Loit	6	6^{11}	6
5	(Slovenia) T Pisnik	6	6
Q	(Spain) C Martínez Granados	1	2
(Spain) A Parra Santonja	4	6	3
(Luxembourg) C Schaul	6	2	6
(Japan) A Morigami	7^{8}	4	6
(Switzerland) T Bacsinszky	6^{6}	6	3

Second round
(France) S Beltrame	4	6^{2}
(Czech Republic) B Strýcová	6	7^{7}
Q	(France) S Cohen-Aloro	1	2
4	(France) É Loit	6	6
5	(Slovenia) T Pisnik	5	2
(Luxembourg) C Schaul	7	6
(Japan) A Morigami	6	3	2
2	(Japan) A Sugiyama	1	6	6

Quarterfinals
(Czech Republic) B Strýcová	3	1
4	(France) É Loit	6	6
(Luxembourg) C Schaul	5	7^{10}	7
2	(Japan) A Sugiyama	7	6^{8}	5

Semifinals
4	(France) É Loit	4	1
(Luxembourg) C Schaul	6	6
