= 2010 French Open =

- Date: 23 May – 6 June 2010
- Edition: 109
- Category: 80th Grand Slam (ITF)
- Surface: Clay
- Location: Paris (XVI^{e}), France
- Venue: Stade Roland Garros

Champions

Men's singles
- (Spain) Rafael Nadal

Women's singles
- (Italy) Francesca Schiavone

Men's doubles
- (Canada) Daniel Nestor / (Serbia) Nenad Zimonjić

Women's doubles
- (United States) Serena Williams / (United States) Venus Williams

Mixed doubles
- (Slovenia) Katarina Srebotnik / (Serbia) Nenad Zimonjić

Wheelchair men's singles
- (Japan) Shingo Kunieda

Wheelchair women's singles
- (Netherlands) Esther Vergeer

Wheelchair men's doubles
- (France) Stéphane Houdet / (Japan) Shingo Kunieda

Wheelchair women's doubles
- (Australia) Daniela Di Toro / (Netherlands) Aniek van Koot

Boys' singles
- (Argentina) Agustín Velotti

Girls' singles
- (Ukraine) Elina Svitolina

Boys' doubles
- (Peru) Duilio Beretta / (Ecuador) Roberto Quiroz

Girls' doubles
- (Hungary) Tímea Babos / (United States) Sloane Stephens

Legends under 45 doubles
- (Russia) Yevgeny Kafelnikov / (Ukraine) Andrei Medvedev

Women's legends doubles
- (United States) Martina Navratilova / (Czech Republic) Jana Novotná

Legends over 45 doubles
- (Ecuador) Andrés Gómez / (United States) John McEnroe
- French Open

The 2010 French Open was a tennis tournament played on outdoor clay courts. It was the 109th edition of the French Open, and the second Grand Slam event of the year. It took place at the Stade Roland Garros in Paris, France, from 23 May through 6 June 2010.

Roger Federer and Svetlana Kuznetsova were the defending champions. Federer lost to Robin Söderling in the quarterfinals, while Kuznetsova lost to Maria Kirilenko in the third round.

The 2010 French Open also featured the return of four-time champion Justine Henin, who retired immediately before the 2008 French Open, where she was the 3-time defending champion.

== Singles players ==
Men's singles

Champion		Runner-up	
(Spain) Rafael Nadal [2]		(Sweden) Robin Söderling [5]	
Semifinals out
(Czech Republic) Tomáš Berdych [15]		(Austria) Jürgen Melzer [22]	
Quarterfinals out
(Switzerland) Roger Federer [1]	(Russia) Mikhail Youzhny [11]	(Serbia) Novak Djokovic [3]	(Spain) Nicolás Almagro [19]
4th round out
(Switzerland) Stan Wawrinka [20]	(Croatia) Marin Čilić [10]	(United Kingdom) Andy Murray [4]	(France) Jo-Wilfried Tsonga [8]
(Russia) Teymuraz Gabashvili (Q)	(United States) Robby Ginepri	(Spain) Fernando Verdasco [7]	(Brazil) Thomaz Bellucci [24]
3rd round out
(Germany) Julian Reister (Q)	(Italy) Fabio Fognini	(Argentina) Leonardo Mayer	(Spain) Albert Montañés [29]
(Cyprus) Marcos Baghdatis [25]	(United States) John Isner [17]	(Serbia) Viktor Troicki	(Netherlands) Thiemo de Bakker
(United States) Andy Roddick [6]	(Spain) David Ferrer [9]	(Spain) Juan Carlos Ferrero [16]	(Romania) Victor Hănescu [31]
(Germany) Philipp Kohlschreiber [30]	(Ukraine) Alexandr Dolgopolov	(Croatia) Ivan Ljubičić [14]	(Australia) Lleyton Hewitt [28]
2nd round out
(Colombia) Alejandro Falla	(Belgium) Olivier Rochus	(Germany) Andreas Beck	(France) Gaël Monfils [13]
(Spain) Daniel Gimeno Traver	(France) Julien Benneteau	(Germany) Tobias Kamke (Q)	(United States) Taylor Dent
(Argentina) Juan Ignacio Chela	(Spain) Marcel Granollers	(Switzerland) Marco Chiudinelli	(France) Édouard Roger-Vasselin (WC)
(Slovakia) Lukáš Lacko	(Australia) Carsten Ball (WC)	(Spain) Guillermo García López [32]	(France) Josselin Ouanna (WC)
(Slovenia) Blaž Kavčič	(Slovenia) Grega Žemlja (Q)	(France) Nicolas Mahut (WC)	(Belgium) Xavier Malisse
(Spain) Pere Riba	(Italy) Potito Starace	(Kazakhstan) Yuri Schukin (Q)	(Japan) Kei Nishikori (PR)
(France) Florent Serra	(Italy) Andreas Seppi	(Belgium) Steve Darcis	(Chile) Fernando González
(United States) Mardy Fish	(Spain) Pablo Andújar (Q)	(Uzbekistan) Denis Istomin	(Argentina) Horacio Zeballos
1st round out
(Australia) Peter Luczak	(Serbia) Janko Tipsarević	(France) Benoît Paire (Q)	(Spain) Feliciano López [27]
(Czech Republic) Jan Hájek	(Italy) Paolo Lorenzi	(Chile) Nicolás Massú	(Germany) Dieter Kindlmann (LL)
(Brazil) Ricardo Mello	(Russia) Dmitry Tursunov (PR)	(Ukraine) Sergiy Stakhovsky	(Latvia) Ernests Gulbis [23]
(Italy) Stefano Galvani (Q)	(France) Stéphane Robert	(Ecuador) Nicolás Lapentti	(France) Laurent Recouderc (WC)
(France) Richard Gasquet	(United States) Ryan Sweeting	(France) Paul-Henri Mathieu	(United States) Jesse Witten (Q)
(Kazakhstan) Andrey Golubev	(India) Somdev Devvarman (Q)	(South Africa) Kevin Anderson	(Chile) Jorge Aguilar (Q)
(Poland) Michał Przysiężny	(United States) Michael Yani (Q)	(Germany) Philipp Petzschner	(Spain) Tommy Robredo [21]
(Germany) Rainer Schüttler	(France) Olivier Patience (Q)	(Poland) Łukasz Kubot	(Germany) Daniel Brands
(Finland) Jarkko Nieminen	(Argentina) Eduardo Schwank	(Austria) Daniel Köllerer	(Argentina) Juan Mónaco [26]
(Israel) Dudi Sela	(Germany) Mischa Zverev	(Germany) Simon Greul	(France) David Guez (WC)
(Uruguay) Pablo Cuevas	(France) Marc Gicquel	(Ukraine) Illya Marchenko	(United States) Sam Querrey [18]
(Spain) Óscar Hernández	(United States) Rajeev Ram	(Colombia) Santiago Giraldo	(Kazakhstan) Evgeny Korolev
(Russia) Igor Kunitsyn	(United States) Michael Russell	(Spain) Santiago Ventura (LL)	(Slovakia) Karol Beck
(Netherlands) Robin Haase (PR)	(Belgium) Kristof Vliegen (PR)	(France) Arnaud Clément	(Brazil) Thiago Alves
(Chinese Taipei) Lu Yen-hsun	(Germany) Michael Berrer	(Italy) Simone Bolelli	(France) Michaël Llodra
(France) Jérémy Chardy	(Germany) Benjamin Becker	(Austria) Martin Fischer (Q)	(France) Gianni Mina (WC)

Women's singles

Champion		Runner-up	
(Italy) Francesca Schiavone [17]		(Australia) Samantha Stosur [7]	
Semifinals out
(Serbia) Jelena Janković [4]		(Russia) Elena Dementieva [5]	
Quarterfinals out
(United States) Serena Williams [1]	(Kazakhstan) Yaroslava Shvedova	(Denmark) Caroline Wozniacki [3]	(Russia) Nadia Petrova [19]
4th round out
(Israel) Shahar Pe'er [18]	(Belgium) Justine Henin [22]	(Slovakia) Daniela Hantuchová [23]	(Australia) Jarmila Groth (WC)
(Russia) Maria Kirilenko [30]	(Italy) Flavia Pennetta [14]	(South Africa) Chanelle Scheepers (Q)	(United States) Venus Williams [2]
3rd round out
(Russia) Anastasia Pavlyuchenkova [29]	(France) Marion Bartoli [13]	(Russia) Maria Sharapova [12]	(Russia) Anastasia Pivovarova (Q)
(Ukraine) Alona Bondarenko [27]	(Belgium) Yanina Wickmayer [16]	(Australia) Anastasia Rodionova	(Russia) Alisa Kleybanova [28]
(Russia) Svetlana Kuznetsova [6]	(China) Li Na [11]	(Slovenia) Polona Hercog	(Romania) Alexandra Dulgheru [31]
(Canada) Aleksandra Wozniak	(Uzbekistan) Akgul Amanmuradova	(France) Aravane Rezaï [15]	(Slovakia) Dominika Cibulková [25]
2nd round out
(Germany) Julia Görges	(United States) Jill Craybas	(United States) Bethanie Mattek-Sands (LL)	(France) Olivia Sanchez (WC)
(Belgium) Kirsten Flipkens	(Czech Republic) Klára Zakopalová	(China) Zheng Jie [25]	(Paraguay) Rossana de los Ríos
(Estonia) Kaia Kanepi	(Slovakia) Magdaléna Rybáriková	(Belarus) Olga Govortsova	(Austria) Sybille Bammer
(Japan) Kimiko Date-Krumm	(Russia) Vera Zvonareva [21]	(Serbia) Ana Ivanovic	(Poland) Agnieszka Radwańska [8]
(Germany) Andrea Petkovic	(Austria) Yvonne Meusburger	(Australia) Sophie Ferguson (Q)	(France) Stéphanie Cohen-Aloro (WC)
(Italy) Roberta Vinci	(Czech Republic) Lucie Šafářová [31]	(Switzerland) Timea Bacsinszky	(Italy) Tathiana Garbin
(Spain) Anabel Medina Garrigues	(Ukraine) Kateryna Bondarenko [32]	(Sweden) Johanna Larsson	(Argentina) Gisela Dulko
(Germany) Angelique Kerber	(Hungary) Ágnes Szávay	(United States) Varvara Lepchenko	(Spain) Arantxa Parra Santonja
1st round out
(Switzerland) Stefanie Vögele	(Hungary) Melinda Czink	(United Kingdom) Katie O'Brien	(France) Alizé Cornet
(Spain) Nuria Llagostera Vives (Q)	(United States) Vania King	(United States) Shenay Perry	(Italy) Maria Elena Camerin
(Russia) Ksenia Pervak (Q)	(Japan) Ayumi Morita	(Slovenia) Katarina Srebotnik (PR)	(Bulgaria) Tsvetana Pironkova
(Russia) Ekaterina Bychkova	(Romania) Raluca Olaru	(Czech Republic) Barbora Záhlavová-Strýcová	(Romania) Simona Halep (Q)
(Australia) Alicia Molik	(France) Pauline Parmentier	(Sweden) Sofia Arvidsson	(Russia) Vera Dushevina
(Thailand) Tamarine Tanasugarn	(Spain) Carla Suárez Navarro	(Colombia) Mariana Duque Mariño	(Czech Republic) Sandra Záhlavová
(Russia) Dinara Safina [9]	(Chinese Taipei) Chan Yung-jan	(Russia) Ekaterina Makarova	(Italy) Alberta Brianti
(Ukraine) Mariya Koryttseva	(Chinese Taipei) Chang Kai-chen	(Italy) Sara Errani	(United Kingdom) Elena Baltacha
(Romania) Sorana Cîrstea	(Russia) Elena Vesnina	(France) Claire Feuerstein (WC)	(Croatia) Karolina Šprem
(Russia) Regina Kulikova	(Czech Republic) Petra Kvitová	(Canada) Stéphanie Dubois	(France) Kristina Mladenovic (WC)
(United Kingdom) Anne Keothavong	(France) Virginie Razzano	(Japan) Misaki Doi (Q)	(Australia) Jelena Dokić
(Czech Republic) Lucie Hradecká	(Germany) Tatjana Malek	(Germany) Kristina Barrois	(Russia) Alla Kudryavtseva
(Croatia) Petra Martić	(United States) Melanie Oudin	(Czech Republic) Iveta Benešová	(France) Julie Coin
(Spain) María José Martínez Sánchez [21]	(Latvia) Anastasija Sevastova	(France) Mathilde Johansson	(Belarus) Victoria Azarenka [10]
(Canada) Heidi El Tabakh (Q)	(Russia) Anna Chakvetadze	(France) Stéphanie Foretz (WC)	(China) Zhang Shuai (Q)
(Russia) Ekaterina Ivanova	(United States) Christina McHale (WC)	(Japan) Kurumi Nara (Q)	(Switzerland) Patty Schnyder

== Seniors ==
=== Men's singles ===
(Spain) Rafael Nadal defeated (Sweden) Robin Söderling, 6–4, 6–2, 6–4

- It was Nadal's 4th title of this year and the 40th of his career. It was his fifth win in six years at Roland Garros and his seventh Grand Slam men's singles victory.
- Nadal reclaimed the No. 1 ATP ranking with this victory.
- Nadal's victory also completed a historic 'Clay Slam' for Nadal, seeing him become the first person in history to win all Masters 1000 tournaments on clay (Monte Carlo, Rome and Madrid), as well as the French Open, in the same calendar year.
- This was the second time Nadal had won the French Open without dropping a set.

=== Women's singles ===
(Italy) Francesca Schiavone defeated (Australia) Samantha Stosur, 6–4, 7–6^{(7–2)}

- Both Schiavone and Stosur were first-time Grand Slam finalists.
- It was Schiavone's second title of the year, the fourth of her career, and her first major title.

=== Men's doubles ===
(Canada) Daniel Nestor / (Serbia) Nenad Zimonjić defeated (Czech Republic) Lukáš Dlouhý / (India) Leander Paes, 7–5, 6–2

=== Women's doubles ===
(United States) Serena Williams / (United States) Venus Williams defeated (Czech Republic) Květa Peschke / (Slovenia) Katarina Srebotnik, 6–2, 6–3

- The Williams sisters won their 12th Grand Slam doubles title and 2nd at the French Open. With this, they hold all Grand Slam doubles titles simultaneously.
- Also, they have won the career women's doubles golden slam for the second time in their respective careers.

=== Mixed doubles ===
(Slovenia) Katarina Srebotnik / (Serbia) Nenad Zimonjić defeated (Kazakhstan) Yaroslava Shvedova / (Austria) Julian Knowle, 4–6, 7–6^{(7–5)}, [11–9]

- Srebotnik and Zimonjić both won their fourth Grand Slam mixed doubles title.

== Juniors ==
=== Boys' singles ===
(Argentina) Agustín Velotti defeated (United States) Andrea Collarini, 6–4, 7–5

=== Girls' singles ===
(Ukraine) Elina Svitolina defeated (Tunisia) Ons Jabeur, 6–2, 7–5

- Svitolina won her first Junior Grand Slam title.

=== Boys' doubles ===
(Peru) Duilio Beretta / (Ecuador) Roberto Quiroz defeated (Argentina) Facundo Argüello / (Argentina) Agustín Velotti, 6–3, 6–2

- Beretta and Quiroz win their first junior Grand Slam title in doubles.

=== Girls' doubles ===
(Hungary) Tímea Babos / (United States) Sloane Stephens defeated (Spain) Lara Arruabarrena / (Spain) María Teresa Torró Flor, 6–2, 6–3

- Babos and Stephens win their first junior Grand Slam title in doubles.

== Other events ==
=== Legends under 45 doubles ===
(Russia) Yevgeny Kafelnikov / (Ukraine) Andriy Medvedev defeated (Croatia) Goran Ivanišević / (Germany) Michael Stich, 6–1, 6–1

=== Legends over 45 doubles ===
(United States) John McEnroe / (Ecuador) Andrés Gómez defeated (Iran) Mansour Bahrami / (France) Henri Leconte, 6–1, 6–1

=== Women's legends doubles ===
(United States) Martina Navratilova / (Czech Republic) Jana Novotná defeated (Croatia) Iva Majoli / (France) Nathalie Tauziat, 6–4, 6–2

=== Wheelchair men's singles ===
(Japan) Shingo Kunieda defeated (Sweden) Stefan Olsson, 6–4, 6–0

- Kunieda won his tenth wheelchair Grand Slam singles title, and his fourth at the French Open.

=== Wheelchair women's singles ===
(Netherlands) Esther Vergeer defeated (Netherlands) Sharon Walraven, 6–0, 6–0

- Vergeer won her 15th wheelchair Grand Slam singles title, and her fourth at the French Open.

=== Wheelchair men's doubles ===
(France) Stéphane Houdet / (Japan) Shingo Kunieda defeated (Netherlands) Robin Ammerlaan / (Sweden) Stefan Olsson, 6–0, 5–7, [10–8]

- Houdet wins his fourth wheelchair Grand Slam doubles title and the first at French Open, and Kunieda wins his ninth wheelchair Grand Slam doubles title and second at French.

=== Wheelchair women's doubles ===
(Australia) Daniela Di Toro / (Netherlands) Aniek van Koot defeated (Netherlands) Esther Vergeer / (Netherlands) Sharon Walraven, 3–6, 6–3, [10–4]

- Di Toro and van Koot win their first wheelchair Grand Slam title in doubles.

== Singles seeds ==
The following are the seeded players and notable players who withdrew from the event. Seedings based on ATP and WTA rankings as of 17 May 2010. Rank and points before are as of 24 May 2010.

=== Men's singles ===
Seed	Rank	Player	Points before	Points defending	Points won	Points after	Status
1	1	(Switzerland) Roger Federer	10,030	2,000	360	8,390	Quarterfinals lost to (Sweden) Robin Söderling [5]
2	2	(Spain) Rafael Nadal	6,880	180	2,000	8,700	Champion, defeated (Sweden) Robin Söderling [5]
3	3	(Serbia) Novak Djokovic	6,405	90	360	6,675	Quarterfinals lost to (Austria) Jürgen Melzer [22]
4	4	(United Kingdom) Andy Murray	5,565	360	180	5,385	Fourth round lost to (Czech Republic) Tomáš Berdych [15]
5	7	(Sweden) Robin Söderling	4,755	1,200	1,200	4,755	Runner-up, lost to (Spain) Rafael Nadal [2]
6	8	(United States) Andy Roddick	4,600	180	90	4,510	Third round lost to (Russia) Teymuraz Gabashvili [Q]
7	9	(Spain) Fernando Verdasco	3,645	180	180	3,645	Fourth round lost to (Spain) Nicolás Almagro [19]
8	10	(France) Jo-Wilfried Tsonga	3,185	180	180	3,185	Fourth round retired against (Russia) Mikhail Youzhny [11]
9	11	(Spain) David Ferrer	3,010	90	90	3,010	Third round lost to (Austria) Jürgen Melzer [22]
10	12	(Croatia) Marin Čilić	2,945	180	180	2,945	Fourth round lost to (Sweden) Robin Söderling [5]
11	14	(Russia) Mikhail Youzhny	2,375	45	360	2,690	Quarterfinals lost to (Czech Republic) Tomáš Berdych [15]
12	13	(Chile) Fernando González	2,385	720	45	1,710	Second round lost to (Ukraine) Alexandr Dolgopolov
13	15	(France) Gaël Monfils	2,220	360	45	1,905	Second round lost to (Italy) Fabio Fognini
14	16	(Croatia) Ivan Ljubičić	2,140	10	90	2,220	Third round lost to (Brazil) Thomaz Bellucci [24]
15	17	(Czech Republic) Tomáš Berdych	2,115	10	720	2,825	Semifinals lost to (Sweden) Robin Söderling [5]
16	18	(Spain) Juan Carlos Ferrero	2,050	45	90	2,095	Third round lost to (United States) Robby Ginepri
17	19	(United States) John Isner	1,880	(45)^{†}	90	1,925	Third round lost to (Czech Republic) Tomáš Berdych [15]
18	22	(United States) Sam Querrey	1,675	10	10	1,675	First round lost to (United States) Robby Ginepri
19	21	(Spain) Nicolás Almagro	1,690	90	360	1,960	Quarterfinals lost to (Spain) Rafael Nadal [2]
20	23	(Switzerland) Stan Wawrinka	1,600	90	180	1,690	Fourth round lost to (Switzerland) Roger Federer [1]
21	26	(Spain) Tommy Robredo	1,505	360	10	1,155	First round lost to (Serbia) Viktor Troicki
22	27	(Austria) Jürgen Melzer	1,495	90	720	2,125	Semifinals lost to (Spain) Rafael Nadal [2]
23	28	(Latvia) Ernests Gulbis	1,494	45	10	1,459	First round lost to (France) Julien Benneteau
24	29	(Brazil) Thomaz Bellucci	1,482	10	180	1,652	Fourth round lost to (Spain) Rafael Nadal [2]
25	30	(Cyprus) Marcos Baghdatis	1,465	10	90	1,545	Fourth round lost to (United Kingdom) Andy Murray [4]
26	25	(Argentina) Juan Mónaco	1,510	45	10	1,475	First round lost to (Slovenia) Grega Žemlja [Q]
27	31	(Spain) Feliciano López	1,420	45	10	1,385	First round lost to (Germany) Julian Reister [Q]
28	33	(Australia) Lleyton Hewitt	1,350	90	90	1,350	Third round lost to (Spain) Rafael Nadal [2]
29	34	(Spain) Albert Montañés	1,325	10	90	1,405	Third round lost to (Sweden) Robin Söderling [5]
30	35	(Germany) Philipp Kohlschreiber	1,320	180	90	1,230	Third round lost to (Spain) Fernando Verdasco [7]
31	37	(Romania) Victor Hănescu	1,160	180	90	1,070	Third round lost to (Serbia) Novak Djokovic [3]
32	40	(Spain) Guillermo García López	965	10	45	1,000	Second round lost to (Netherlands) Thiemo de Bakker

†The player did not qualify for the tournament in 2009. Accordingly, this was the 18th best result deducted instead.

The following players would have been seeded, but they withdrew from the event.

Rank	Player	Points before	Points defending	Points after	Withdrawal reason
5	(Russia) Nikolay Davydenko	5,145	360	4,785	Wrist injury
6	(Argentina) Juan Martín del Potro	5,115	720	4,395	Right wrist surgery
20	(Czech Republic) Radek Štěpánek	1705	90	1,615	Fatigue
23	(Germany) Tommy Haas	1,660	180	1,480	Right hip surgery
32	(France) Gilles Simon	1,395	90	1,305	Right knee injury
36	(Croatia) Ivo Karlović	1,295	10	1,285	Right foot injury

=== Women's singles ===
Seed	Rank	Player	Points before	Points defending	Points won	Points after	Status
1	1	(United States) Serena Williams	8,475	500	500	8,475	Quarterfinals lost to (Australia) Samantha Stosur [7]
2	2	(United States) Venus Williams	6,386	160	280	6,506	Fourth round lost to (Russia) Nadia Petrova [19]
3	3	(Denmark) Caroline Wozniacki	5,630	160	500	5,970	Quarterfinals lost to (Italy) Francesca Schiavone [17]
4	4	(Serbia) Jelena Janković	5,160	280	900	5,780	Semifinals lost to (Australia) Samantha Stosur [7]
5	5	(Russia) Elena Dementieva	4,830	160	900	5,570	Semifinals retired against (Italy) Francesca Schiavone [17]
6	6	(Russia) Svetlana Kuznetsova	4,661	2,000	160	2,821	Third round lost to (Russia) Maria Kirilenko [30]
7	7	(Australia) Samantha Stosur	4,405	900	1,400	4,905	Runner-up, lost to (Italy) Francesca Schiavone [17]
8	8	(Poland) Agnieszka Radwańska	4,190	280	100	4,010	Second round lost to (Kazakhstan) Yaroslava Shvedova
9	9	(Russia) Dinara Safina	4,156	1,400	5	2,761	First round lost to (Japan) Kimiko Date-Krumm
10	11	(Belarus) Victoria Azarenka	3,665	500	5	3,170	First round lost to (Argentina) Gisela Dulko
11	12	(China) Li Na	3,515	280	160	3,395	Third round lost to (Italy) Francesca Schiavone [17]
12	13	(Russia) Maria Sharapova	3,350	500	160	3,010	Third round lost to (Belgium) Justine Henin [22]
13	14	(France) Marion Bartoli	3,186	100	160	3,246	Third round lost to (Israel) Shahar Pe'er [18]
14	15	(Italy) Flavia Pennetta	3,175	5	280	3,450	Fourth round lost to (Denmark) Caroline Wozniacki [3]
15	19	(France) Aravane Rezaï	2,875	280	160	2,755	Third round lost to (Russia) Nadia Petrova [18]
16	16	(Belgium) Yanina Wickmayer	3,050	100	160	3,110	Third round lost to (Slovakia) Daniela Hantuchová [22]
17	17	(Italy) Francesca Schiavone	2,995	5	2,000	4,990	Champion, defeated (Australia) Samantha Stosur [7]
18	18	(Israel) Shahar Pe'er	2,895	0	280	3,175	Fourth round lost to (United States) Serena Williams [1]
19	20	(Russia) Nadia Petrova	2,795	100	500	3,195	Quarterfinals lost to (Russia) Elena Dementieva [5]
20	21	(Spain) María José Martínez Sánchez	2,635	160	5	2,480	First round lost to (Uzbekistan) Akgul Amanmuradova
21	22	(Russia) Vera Zvonareva	2,625	0	100	2,725	Second round lost to (Australia) Anastasia Rodionova
22	23	(Belgium) Justine Henin	2,575	0	280	2,855	Fourth round lost to (Australia) Samantha Stosur [7]
23	26	(Slovakia) Daniela Hantuchová	2,010	5	280	2,285	Fourth round lost to (Serbia) Jelena Janković [4]
24	25	(Czech Republic) Lucie Šafářová	2,075	100	100	2,075	Second round lost to (Slovenia) Polona Hercog
25	24	(China) Zheng Jie	2,325	100	100	2,325	Second round lost to (Russia) Anastasia Pivovarova [Q]
26	27	(Slovakia) Dominika Cibulková	2,005	900	160	1,265	Third round lost to (United States) Venus Williams [2]
27	31	(Ukraine) Alona Bondarenko	1,700	5	160	1,855	Third round lost to (Serbia) Jelena Janković [4]
28	28	(Russia) Alisa Kleybanova	1,855	5	160	2,010	Third round lost to (Kazakhstan) Yaroslava Shvedova
29	29	(Russia) Anastasia Pavlyuchenkova	1,850	160	160	1,850	Third round lost to (United States) Serena Williams [1]
30	30	(Russia) Maria Kirilenko	1,710	5	280	1,985	Fourth round lost to (Italy) Francesca Schiavone [17]
31	32	(Romania) Alexandra Dulgheru	1,655	(30)^{†}	160	1,785	Third round lost to (Denmark) Caroline Wozniacki [3]
32	35	(Ukraine) Kateryna Bondarenko	1,570	160	100	1,510	Second round lost to (Canada) Aleksandra Wozniak

†The player did not qualify the tournament in 2009. Accordingly, this was the 16th best result deducted instead.

The following players would have been seeded, but they withdrew from the event.

Rank	Player	Points before	Points defending	Points after	Withdrawal reason
10	(Belgium) Kim Clijsters	3,890	0	3,890	Left foot injury

== Wildcard entries ==
Below are the lists of the wildcard awardees entering in the main draws.

=== Men's singles wildcard entries ===
1. (United States) Ryan Sweeting
2. (Australia) Carsten Ball
3. (France) David Guez
4. (France) Nicolas Mahut
5. (France) Gianni Mina
6. (France) Josselin Ouanna
7. (France) Laurent Recouderc
8. (France) Édouard Roger-Vasselin

=== Women's singles wildcard entries ===
1. (United States) Christina McHale
2. (Australia) Jarmila Groth
3. (France) Stéphanie Cohen-Aloro
4. (France) Claire Feuerstein
5. (France) Stéphanie Foretz
6. (France) Mathilde Johansson
7. (France) Kristina Mladenovic
8. (France) Olivia Sanchez

=== Men's doubles wildcard entries ===
1. (France) Thierry Ascione / (France) Laurent Recouderc
2. (France) Nicolas Devilder / (France) Paul-Henri Mathieu
3. (France) Jonathan Eysseric / (France) Benoît Paire
4. (France) Richard Gasquet / (France) Sébastien Grosjean
5. (France) Marc Gicquel / (France) Édouard Roger-Vasselin
6. (France) Guillaume Rufin / (France) Alexandre Sidorenko

=== Women's doubles wildcard entries ===
1. (France) Séverine Brémond Beltrame / (France) Youlia Fedossova
2. (France) Stéphanie Cohen-Aloro / (France) Pauline Parmentier
3. (France) Claire Feuerstein / (France) Stéphanie Foretz
4. (France) Mathilde Johansson / (France) Camille Pin
5. (France) Sophie Lefèvre / (France) Aurélie Védy
6. (France) Kristina Mladenovic / (Tunisia) Selima Sfar
7. (France) Irena Pavlovic / (France) Laura Thorpe

=== Mixed doubles wildcard entries ===
1. (France) Stéphanie Cohen-Aloro / (France) Thierry Ascione
2. (France) Julie Coin / (France) Nicolas Mahut
3. (France) Mathilde Johansson / (France) Sébastien de Chaunac
4. (France) Kristina Mladenovic / (France) Alexandre Sidorenko
5. (France) Pauline Parmentier / (France) Marc Gicquel
6. (France) Aurélie Védy / (France) Michaël Llodra

== Protected ranking ==
The following players were accepted directly into the main draw using a protected ranking:

Men's Singles

- (Russia) Dmitry Tursunov (58)
- (Belgium) Kristof Vliegen (68)
- (Netherlands) Robin Haase (104)
- (Japan) Kei Nishikori (106)

Women's Singles

- (Slovenia) Katarina Srebotnik (20)

== Qualifiers entries ==
=== Men's qualifiers entries ===
1. (Spain) Pablo Andújar
2. (Kazakhstan) Yuri Schukin
3. (France) Olivier Patience
4. (United States) Jesse Witten
5. (Brazil) Thiago Alves
6. (India) Somdev Devvarman
7. (United States) Michael Yani
8. (Italy) Stefano Galvani
9. (Russia) Teymuraz Gabashvili
10. (Chile) Jorge Aguilar
11. (France) Benoît Paire
12. (Austria) Martin Fischer
13. (Germany) Julian Reister
14. (Slovenia) Grega Žemlja
15. (Italy) Simone Bolelli
16. (Germany) Tobias Kamke

The following players received the lucky loser spot:

1. (Spain) Santiago Ventura
2. (Germany) Dieter Kindlmann

=== Women's qualifiers entries ===
1. (Canada) Heidi El Tabakh
2. (Japan) Kurumi Nara
3. (Russia) Ekaterina Ivanova
4. (Australia) Sophie Ferguson
5. (China) Zhang Shuai
6. (Russia) Anastasia Pivovarova
7. (Russia) Ksenia Pervak
8. (Japan) Misaki Doi
9. (Romania) Simona Halep
10. (Estonia) Kaia Kanepi
11. (Spain) Nuria Llagostera Vives
12. (South Africa) Chanelle Scheepers

The following player received the lucky loser spot:

1. (United States) Bethanie Mattek-Sands

== Withdrawals ==
The following players were accepted directly into the main tournament, but withdrew with injuries or personal reasons.

Men's Singles

- ‡ (Argentina) Juan Martín del Potro (5) → replaced by (Spain) Daniel Gimeno Traver (100)
- ‡ (Russia) Nikolay Davydenko (6) → replaced by (Italy) Paolo Lorenzi (101)
- ‡ (Germany) Tommy Haas (21) → replaced by (Brazil) Ricardo Mello (102)
- ‡ (Russia) Igor Andreev (50) → replaced by (South Africa) Kevin Anderson (103)
- ‡ (United States) James Blake (53) → replaced by (Poland) Michał Przysiężny (104)
- ‡ (Czech Republic) Radek Štěpánek (19) → replaced by (Netherlands) Robin Haase (104 PR)
- ‡ (France) Gilles Simon (26) → replaced by (Russia) Igor Kunitsyn (105)
- ‡ (Argentina) David Nalbandian (15 PR) → replaced by (United States) Taylor Dent (106)
- ‡ (Croatia) Ivo Karlović (28) → replaced by (Japan) Kei Nishikori (106 PR)
- ‡ (Spain) Carlos Moyá (52 PR) → replaced by (United States) Robby Ginepri (107)
- † (Croatia) Mario Ančić (65 PR) → replaced by (Spain) Santiago Ventura (LL)
- § (Germany) Florian Mayer (45) → replaced by (Germany) Dieter Kindlmann (LL)

Women's Singles

- ‡ (Poland) Urszula Radwańska (105) → replaced by (United Kingdom) Katie O'Brien (108)
- ‡ (India) Sania Mirza (90) → replaced by (United Kingdom) Anne Keothavong (109)
- ‡ (Germany) Anna-Lena Grönefeld (65) → replaced by (Russia) Ekaterina Bychkova (110)
- ‡ (Germany) Sabine Lisicki (28) → replaced by (Sweden) Johanna Larsson (111)
- ‡ (Belgium) Kim Clijsters (10) → replaced by (Canada) Stéphanie Dubois (113)
- § (China) Peng Shuai (55) → replaced by (United States) Bethanie Mattek-Sands (LL)

‡ – withdrew from entry list before qualifying began
† – withdrew from entry list after qualifying began
§ – withdrew from main draw

== Point distribution ==
Stage	Men's singles	Men's doubles	Women's singles	Women's doubles
Champion	2000			
Finals	1200		1400	
Semifinals	720		900	
Quarterfinals	360		500	
Round of 16	180		280	
Round of 32	90		160	
Round of 64	45	0	100	5
Round of 128	10	–	5	–
Qualifier	25	–	60	–
Qualifying 3rd round	16	–	50	–
Qualifying 2nd round	8	–	40	–
Qualifying 1st round	0	–	2	–

== Prize money ==
All prize money is in Euros (€); doubles prize money is distributed per pair.

=== Men's and women's singles ===
- Winners: €1,120,000
- Runners-up: €560,000
- Semi-finalists: €280,000
- Quarter-finalists: €140,000
- Fourth round: €70,000
- Third round: €42,000
- Second round: €25,000
- First round: €15,000

=== Men's and women's doubles ===
- Winners: €320,000
- Runners-up: €160,000
- Semi-finalists: €80,000
- Quarter-finalists: €40,000
- Third round: €22,000
- Second round: €11,000
- First round: €7,500

=== Mixed doubles ===
- Winners: €100,000
- Runners-up: €50,000
- Semi-finalists: €25,000
- Quarter-finalists: €13,000
- Second round: €7,000
- First round: €3,500

== Media coverage ==
- Australia: Nine, Fox Sports
- Canada: TSN, RDS
- Brazil: ESPN, ESPN Brasil
- United States: NBC, ESPN2, Tennis Channel
- Europe: Eurosport
  - Domestic rights have also been sold to the following broadcasters, who may only cover the later rounds or not show any coverage at all, depending on the progress of domestic players:
  - Austria: ORF
  - Belgium: RTBF, VRT
  - Bosnia and Herzegovina: BHRT
  - Croatia: HRT
  - Cyprus: CyBC
  - Denmark: TV2 Sport
  - France: France Télévisions, Orange Sport
  - Finland: MTV3, FST5
  - Germany: ARD, ZDF
  - Greece: ERT, ANT1, Mega Channel
  - (Republic of Ireland) Ireland: TG4
  - Montenegro: RTCG
  - Netherlands: NOS
  - Romania: TVR
  - Russia: Eurosport, Russia 2
  - Serbia: RTS
  - Slovenia: RTV Slovenija
  - Spain: TVE
  - Sweden: SVT
  - Switzerland: SRG-SSR
  - Turkey: TRT
  - United Kingdom: BBC
- People's Republic of China: CCTV
- Hong Kong: Now Sports
- India: ESPN STAR Sports
- Japan: Wowow
- (Macau) Macao: TDM
- Malaysia: Astro
- Morocco: SNRT
- New Zealand: Sky Sport
- Thailand: TV7, True Sport
- Sub-Saharan Africa: Supersport
- Middle East and North Africa: Al Jazeera Sports
- Latin America: ESPN Latin America
- Philippines: Balls, Studio 23
- Singapore: Starhub

== Miscellaneous ==
- Rafael Nadal's victory marked the fifth consecutive year that the No.2 seed won the tournament (Nadal in 2006, 2007, 2008 and 2010, and Roger Federer in 2009).
- Part of the music video of the Martin Solveig song "Hello" was filmed at Roland Garros prior to the tournament starting.

Preceded by 2010 Australian Open	Grand Slams	Succeeded by 2010 Wimbledon
