= Open Porte du Hainaut =

Open Engie Porte du Hainaut

Defunct tennis tournament
- Event name: Denain
- Location: Denain, France
- Venue: Tennis Club Municipal de Denain
- Category: ITF Women's Circuit
- Surface: Clay
- Draw: 32S/32Q/16D
- Prize money: $25,000
- Website: Official Website

The Open Engie Porte du Hainaut is a tournament for professional female tennis players. The event, played on outdoor clay courts, is classified as a $25,000 ITF Women's Circuit tournament and has been held in Denain, France, since 1998. It was previously a $75,000 tournament, from 2003 to 2008.

== Past finals ==
=== Singles ===
Year	Champion	Runner-up	Score
2020	tournament cancelled due to the COVID-19 pandemic		
2019	(Luxembourg) Eléonora Molinaro	(Germany) Katharina Hobgarski	6–4, 1–6, 6–3
2018	(Ukraine) Valeriya Strakhova	(United States) Allie Kiick	3–6, 7–6^{(7–5)}, 6–0
2017	(North Macedonia) Lina Gjorcheska	(Japan) Mari Osaka	6–2, 5–7, 7–6^{(8–6)}
2016	(Argentina) Nadia Podoroska	(France) Irina Ramialison	6–3, 5–7, 6–4
2015	(Spain) Paula Badosa	(France) Irina Ramialison	7–5, 6–0
2014	(Romania) Andreea Mitu	(France) Fiona Ferro	4–6, 6–2, 6–1
2013	(Brazil) Teliana Pereira	(Italy) Alberta Brianti	6–4, 7–5
2012	(Slovakia) Kristína Kučová	(Slovakia) Michaela Hončová	6–2, 1–6, 6–2
2011	(Brazil) Teliana Pereira	(Ukraine) Valentyna Ivakhnenko	6–4, 6–3
2010	(France) Anaïs Laurendon	(France) Stéphanie Cohen-Aloro	6–3, 7–5
2009	(France) Stéphanie Cohen-Aloro	(Russia) Ksenia Pervak	6–3, 6–4
2008	(Germany) Kristina Barrois	(France) Kinnie Laisné	6–2, 6–4
2007	(France) Olivia Sanchez	(Belarus) Anastasiya Yakimova	6–2, 1–6, 6–1
2006	(Italy) Romina Oprandi	(France) Stéphanie Foretz	6–3, 4–6, 6–3
2005	(Russia) Lioudmila Skavronskaia	(Spain) Arantxa Parra Santonja	7–6^{(7–5)}, 6–0
2004	(Germany) Anna-Lena Grönefeld	(Madagascar) Dally Randriantefy	6–3, 6–2
2003	(Spain) Anabel Medina Garrigues	(Spain) Gala León García	6–4, 6–0
2002	(Madagascar) Dally Randriantefy	(Russia) Maria Goloviznina	6–2, 3–6, 6–2
2001	(France) Céline Beigbeder	(Bulgaria) Lubomira Bacheva	6–4, 6–0
2000	(Spain) Anabel Medina Garrigues	(Spain) María José Martínez Sánchez	2–6, 7–5, 6–0
1999	(Bulgaria) Lubomira Bacheva	(France) Stéphanie Foretz	6–4, 6–1
1998	(France) Sophie Erre	(France) Sandrine Bouilleau	6–2, 6–3

=== Doubles ===
Year	Champions	Runners-up	Score
2021	(Kazakhstan) Anna Danilina (Ukraine) Valeriya Strakhova	(Hungary) Dalma Gálfi (Argentina) Paula Ormaechea	7–5, 3–6, [10–4]
2020	tournament cancelled due to the COVID-19 pandemic		
2019	(Russia) Daria Mishina (China) Xu Shilin	(Chile) Bárbara Gatica (Brazil) Rebeca Pereira	6–0, 7–5
2018	(Japan) Momoko Kobori (Japan) Ayano Shimizu	(Netherlands) Quirine Lemoine (Netherlands) Eva Wacanno	0–6, 7–5, [10–7]
2017	(Japan) Momoko Kobori (Japan) Ayano Shimizu	(France) Mathilde Armitano (France) Elixane Lechemia	6–4, 6–3
2016	(Slovakia) Michaela Hončová (France) Shérazad Reix	(United Kingdom) Amanda Carreras (Italy) Alice Savoretti	6–1, 6–3
2015	(Belgium) Elise Mertens (Turkey) İpek Soylu	(Switzerland) Xenia Knoll (Argentina) Florencia Molinero	7–6^{(7–3)}, 6–3
2014	(Brazil) Paula Cristina Gonçalves (Argentina) Florencia Molinero	(United Kingdom) Nicola Slater (Australia) Karolina Wlodarczak	7–6^{(7–3)}, 7–6^{(7–4)}
2013	(Argentina) Tatiana Búa (Spain) Arabela Fernández Rabener	(Romania) Laura-Ioana Andrei (Bulgaria) Dia Evtimova	7–5, 6–2
2012	(France) Myrtille Georges (France) Céline Ghesquière	(Slovakia) Michaela Hončová (Bulgaria) Isabella Shinikova	6–4, 6–2
2011	(Paraguay) Verónica Cepede Royg (Brazil) Teliana Pereira	(France) Céline Ghesquière (France) Elixane Lechemia	6–1, 6–1
2010	(Russia) Nadejda Guskova (Ukraine) Maryna Zanevska	(Italy) Evelyn Mayr (Italy) Julia Mayr	6–2, 6–0
2009	(Russia) Elena Chalova (Russia) Ksenia Lykina	(Poland) Magdalena Kiszczyńska (Serbia) Teodora Mirčić	6–4, 6–3
2008	(Estonia) Maret Ani (Spain) Lourdes Domínguez Lino	(France) Stéphanie Cohen-Aloro (Canada) Marie-Ève Pelletier	6–0, 7–5
2007	(Czech Republic) Eva Hrdinová (Canada) Marie-Ève Pelletier	(Switzerland) Timea Bacsinszky (Poland) Karolina Kosińska	6–3, 6–2
2006	(Italy) Romina Oprandi (Germany) Jasmin Wöhr	(Poland) Klaudia Jans (Poland) Alicja Rosolska	4–6, 6–2, 6–4
2005	(Czech Republic) Lucie Hradecká (Czech Republic) Vladimíra Uhlířová	(Hungary) Zsófia Gubacsi (Ukraine) Mariya Koryttseva	6–0, 7–5
2004	(Ukraine) Yuliana Fedak (Germany) Anna-Lena Grönefeld	(Bulgaria) Lubomira Bacheva (Czech Republic) Michaela Paštiková	1–6, 6–1, 6–2
2003	(Italy) Mara Santangelo (Italy) Antonella Serra Zanetti	(Ukraine) Yuliya Beygelzimer (Belarus) Tatiana Poutchek	7–5, 6–3
2002	(Czech Republic) Olga Blahotová (Czech Republic) Gabriela Navrátilová	(Ukraine) Yuliya Beygelzimer (Luxembourg) Claudine Schaul	6–3, 6–0
2001	(France) Émilie Loit (Kazakhstan) Irina Selyutina	(Netherlands) Debby Haak (Netherlands) Jolanda Mens	6–1, 6–3
2000	(Spain) Lourdes Domínguez Lino (Spain) María José Martínez Sánchez	(Russia) Elena Bovina (Argentina) Mariana Díaz Oliva	6–4, 6–0
1999	(Spain) Rosa María Andrés Rodríguez (Spain) Conchita Martínez Granados	(Argentina) Luciana Masante (Spain) Mariam Ramon Climent	6–1, 6–4
1998	(France) Amandine Dulon (France) Olivia Sanchez	(South Africa) Delene Ackron (South Africa) Karen Bacon	5–7, 7–5, 6–3
