= Olivia Sanchez =

French tennis player (born 1982)

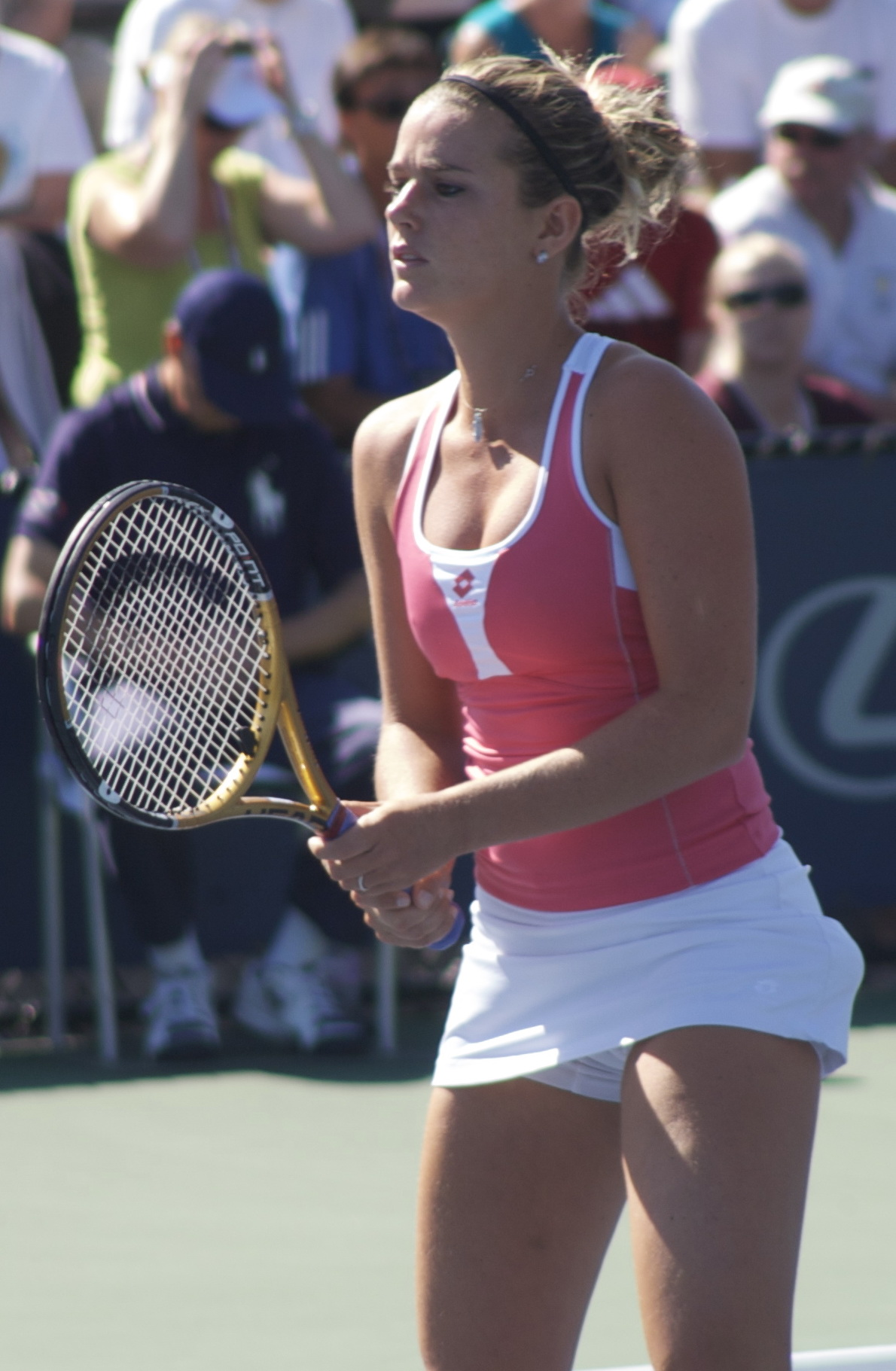
- Sanchez at the US Open, 2008
- Country (sports): France
- Residence: Paris
- Born: 17 November 1982 (age 42); Paris
- Height: 1.72 m (5 ft 8 in)
- Turned pro: 1998
- Retired: 2012
- Plays: Right-handed (two-handed backhand)
- Prize money: $376,039

Singles
- Career record: 287–209
- Career titles: 12 ITF
- Highest ranking: No. 90 (9 June 2008)

Grand Slam singles results
- Australian Open: Q3 (2008)
- French Open: 2R (2008, 2010)
- Wimbledon: Q1 (2008, 2010, 2011)
- US Open: 1R (2007, 2008)

Doubles
- Career record: 20–49
- Career titles: 1 ITF
- Highest ranking: No. 427 (6 December 2010)

Grand Slam doubles results
- French Open: 1R (2007, 2008)

Olivia Sanchez (born 17 November 1982) is a retired French tennis player. Her paternal grandparents are Spanish.

On 9 June 2008, she reached her best singles ranking of world No. 90. On 6 December 2010, she peaked at No. 427 in the doubles rankings. In her career, Sanchez won 12 singles titles and one doubles title on the ITF Women's Circuit. She finished her career with a record of 287 wins and 207 losses and prize money of $376,039.

She was coached by Norbert Palmier.

== Tennis career ==
=== 2007 ===
In May, she received a wildcard into the main draw of the French Open, but lost to American Shenay Perry in the first round, in three sets.

Sanchez reached five ITF singles finals, winning four (in Spain, Portugal, France and Mexico). Sanchez won her first $75k tournament in September 2007 at the Open Engie Porte du Hainaut, defeating Anastasiya Yakimova in the final.

=== 2008 ===
At the Australian Open, she defeated Zuzana Ondrášková and Yuliya Beygelzimer, but then lost to Alisa Kleybanova in the final round of qualifying, in straight sets.

In February, Sanchez made her WTA Tour main-draw debut at the Abierto Mexicano. She won in the first round against Martina Müller, but lost 1–6, 5–7 to Sorana Cîrstea in the second.

She received a wildcard into the main draw of the French Open but lost 2–6, 6–7 to Karin Knapp. On 9 June 2008, Sanchez reached her highest singles ranking of world No. 90.

=== 2009 ===
Sanchez received another wildcard into the main draw of the French Open.

=== 2010 ===
Sanchez received a wildcard entry into the main draw of the French Open, but lost 5–7, 2–6 against Marion Bartoli in the second round.

She reached five singles finals on the ITF Circuit, winning four (in the United States, Brazil, Spain and France).

Sanchez declared her retirement from tennis in 2012.

=== Overall ===
She finished her career with a record of 287 wins and 207 losses and prize money of $376,039. Her best singles ranking was No. 90 in the world.

== ITF finals ==
Legend
$75,000 tournaments
$50,000 tournaments
$25,000 tournaments
$10,000 tournaments

=== Singles (12–10) ===
Result	No.	Date	Tournament	Surface	Opponent	Score
Loss	1.	29 June 1998	ITF Mont-de-Marsan, France	Clay	(France) Stéphanie Testard	2–6, 5–7
Win	1.	1 November 1999	Open de Saint-Raphaël, France	Hard (i)	(Germany) Magdalena Kučerová	6–1, 1–6, 7–5
Loss	2.	15 November 1999	ITF Deauville, France	Clay (i)	(France) Virginie Razzano	4–6, 5–7
Loss	3.	18 September 2000	ITF Sunderland, UK	Hard (i)	(United Kingdom) Hannah Collin	3–6, 3–6
Loss	4.	30 September 2001	ITF Sunderland, UK	Hard (i)	(Sweden) Sofia Arvidsson	3–6, 6–2, 0–6
Loss	5.	27 January 2002	ITF Belfort, France	Hard (i)	(Germany) Sandra Klösel	4–6, 4–6
Loss	6.	1 May 2006	ITF Vic, Spain	Clay	(Spain) Nuria Sánchez García	2–6, 6–7^{(8)}
Win	2.	19 June 2006	Open de Montpellier, France	Clay	(France) Stéphanie Vongsouthi	6–7^{(6)}, 6–0, 6–0
Loss	7.	23 July 2006	ITF Vittel, France	Clay	(Australia) Jarmila Wolfe	4–6, 0–6
Win	3.	19 September 2006	ITF Madrid, Spain	Hard	(United Kingdom) Katie O'Brien	6–7^{(7)}, 6–4, 6–4
Loss	8.	8 July 2007	ITF Mont-de-Marsan, France	Clay	(Greece) Anna Gerasimou	3–6, 6–2, 4–6
Win	4.	5 August 2007	ITF Vigo, Spain	Hard	(New Zealand) Marina Erakovic	w/o
Win	5.	4 August 2007	ITF Coimbra, Portugal	Hard	(Portugal) Neuza Silva	7–6^{(8)}, 6–1
Win	6.	3 September 2007	Open Denain, France	Clay	(Belarus) Anastasiya Yakimova	6–2, 1–6, 6–1
Win	7.	28 October 2007	ITF Mexico City	Hard	(Liechtenstein) Stephanie Vogt	2–6, 6–2, 6–2
Win	8.	1 February 2010	ITF Rancho Mirage, United States	Hard	(Slovenia) Tadeja Majerič	7–5, 6–0
Win	9.	8 February 2010	ITF Laguna Niguel, United States	Hard	(Luxembourg) Mandy Minella	6–3, 6–4
Loss	9.	9 May 2010	ITF Rio de Janeiro, Brazil	Clay	(Peru) Bianca Botto	2–6, 6–1, 4–6
Win	10.	16 May 2010	ITF Rio de Janeiro, Brazil	Clay	(Peru) Bianca Botto	6–4, 6–3
Win	11.	4 June 2010	ITF Pozoblanco, Spain	Hard	(Spain) Beatriz García Vidagany	6–3, 6–4
Loss	10.	18 July 2010	Open de Contrexéville, France	Clay	(Australia) Jelena Dokic	6–4, 3–6, 1–6
Win	12.	25 April 2011	ITF San Severo, Italy	Clay	(Italy) Alice Moroni	6–2, 6–1

=== Doubles (1–0) ===
Result	No.	Date	Tournament	Surface	Partner	Opponents	Score
Win	1.	7 September 1998	Open Denain, France	Clay	(France) Amandine Dulon	(South Africa) Lincky Ackron (South Africa) Karyn Bacon	5–7, 7–5, 6–3
