= 2004 Internationaux de Strasbourg =

- Date: 17 – 22 May
- Edition: 18st
- Category: Tier III
- Draw: 30S / 16D
- Prize money: $170,000
- Surface: Clay / outdoor
- Location: Strasbourg, France
- Venue: Centre Sportif de Hautepierre

Champions

Singles
- (Luxembourg) Claudine Schaul

Doubles
- (Australia) Lisa McShea / (Venezuela) Milagros Sequera
- Internationaux de Strasbourg

The 2004 Internationaux de Strasbourg was a tennis tournament played on outdoor clay courts. It was the 18st edition of the Internationaux de Strasbourg, and was part of the Tier III category of the 2004 WTA Tour. It took place at the Centre Sportif de Hautepierre in Strasbourg, France from 17 May until 22 May 2004. Unseeded Claudine Schaul won the singles title.

== Finals ==
=== Singles ===
(Luxembourg) Claudine Schaul defeated (United States) Lindsay Davenport 2–6, 6–0, 6–3

- It was Schaul's only WTA singles title of her career.

=== Doubles ===
(Australia) Lisa McShea / (Venezuela) Milagros Sequera defeated (Slovenia) Tina Križan / (Slovenia) Katarina Srebotnik 6–4, 6–1
