= 2005 Internationaux de Strasbourg – Doubles =

Doubles
- 2005 Internationaux de Strasbourg

Final
- Champions: (Spain) Rosa María Andrés (Romania) Andreea Vanc
- Runners-up: (Poland) Marta Domachowska (Germany) Marlene Weingärtner
- Score: 6–3, 6–1

Events
Singles	Doubles
← 2004 ·	Internationaux de Strasbourg	· 2006 →

Lisa McShea and Milagros Sequera were the defending champions, but Sequera did not compete this year. McShea teamed up with Abigail Spears and lost in semifinals to tournament runners-up Marta Domachowska and Marlene Weingärtner.

Rosa María Andrés Rodríguez and Andreea Ehritt-Vanc won the title by defeating Marta Domachowska and Marlene Weingärtner 6–3, 6–1 in the final.

== Seeds ==
1. (Australia) Bryanne Stewart / (Australia) Samantha Stosur (first round)
2. (Czech Republic) Iveta Benešová / (Czech Republic) Květa Peschke (first round)
3. (China) Yan Zi / (China) Zheng Jie (quarterfinals)
4. (Chinese Taipei) Janet Lee / (China) Peng Shuai (first round)

== Draw ==
=== Key ===
- Q = Qualifier
- WC = Wild card
- LL = Lucky loser
- Alt = Alternate
- SE = Special exempt
- PR = Protected ranking
- ITF = ITF entry
- JE = Junior exempt
- w/o = Walkover
- r = Retired
- d = Defaulted
- SR = Special ranking

First round
1	(Australia) B Stewart (Australia) S Stosur	4	6	3
Q	(Slovakia) K Kachlíková (India) S Mirza	6	3	6
(Croatia) D Jurak (United States) L Osterloh	5	3
(Poland) M Domachowska (Germany) M Weingärtner	7	6
4	(Chinese Taipei) J Lee (China) S Peng	5	4
(Luxembourg) C Schaul (Slovenia) K Srebotnik	7	6
(Australia) L McShea (United States) A Spears	6	7
(Australia) E Dominikovic (Argentina) E Krauth	4	5
WC	(France) S Foretz (Argentina) N Gussoni	4	5
(France) C Dhenin (Czech Republic) G Navrátilová	6	7
(New Zealand) L Baker (Italy) F Lubiani	1	3
3	(China) Z Yan (China) J Zheng	6	6
(Poland) K Jans (Poland) A Rosolska	6^{5}	2
(Thailand) T Tanasugarn (Germany) J Wöhr	7^{7}	6
(Spain) RM Andrés (Romania) A Vanc	5	6	6
2	(Czech Republic) I Benešová (Czech Republic) K Peschke	7	4	1

Quarterfinals
Q	(Slovakia) K Kachlíková (India) S Mirza	6^{2}	6	6^{5}
(Poland) M Domachowska (Germany) M Weingärtner	7^{7}	1	7^{7}
(Luxembourg) C Schaul (Slovenia) K Srebotnik	6^{0}	4
(Australia) L McShea (United States) A Spears	7^{7}	6
(France) C Dhenin (Czech Republic) G Navrátilová	6	6
3	(China) Z Yan (China) J Zheng	4	1
(Thailand) T Tanasugarn (Germany) J Wöhr	4	2
(Spain) RM Andrés (Romania) A Vanc	6	6

Semifinals
(Poland) M Domachowska (Germany) M Weingärtner	6	3
(Australia) L McShea (United States) A Spears	4	1r
(France) C Dhenin (Czech Republic) G Navrátilová	2	2
(Spain) RM Andrés (Romania) A Vanc	6	6

Final
(Poland) M Domachowska (Germany) M Weingärtner	3	1
(Spain) RM Andrés (Romania) A Vanc	6	6
