= 2002 Internationaux de Strasbourg – Doubles =

Doubles
- 2002 Internationaux de Strasbourg

Final
- Champions: (United States) Jennifer Hopkins (Croatia) Jelena Kostanić
- Runners-up: (France) Caroline Dhenin (Slovenia) Maja Matevžič
- Score: 0–6, 6–4, 6–4

Events
| Singles | Doubles |
| ← 2001 · | Internationaux de Strasbourg | · 2003 → |

Silvia Farina Elia and Iroda Tulyaganova were the defending champions, but both players decided to focus on the singles tournament. Farina Elia ended up winning that title.

Jennifer Hopkins and Jelena Kostanić won the title by defeating Caroline Dhenin and Maja Matevžič 0–6, 6–4, 6–4 in the final.

== Seeds ==
1. (United States) Lisa Raymond / (Australia) Rennae Stubbs (quarterfinals, withdrew)
2. (Federal Republic of Yugoslavia) Jelena Dokic / (United States) Meghann Shaughnessy (quarterfinals)
3. (Switzerland) Emmanuelle Gagliardi / (Chinese Taipei) Janet Lee (first round)
4. (Australia) Lisa McShea / (Kazakhstan) Irina Selyutina (first round)

== Draw ==
=== Key ===
- Q = Qualifier
- WC = Wild card
- LL = Lucky loser
- Alt = Alternate
- ITF = ITF entry
- PR = Protected ranking
- SR = Special ranking
- SE = Special exempt
- JE = Junior exempt
- JR = Junior Accelerator Programme entrant
- CO = College Accelerator Programme entrant
- NG = Next Gen Accelerator Program entrant
- w/o = Walkover
- r = Retired
- d = Defaulted

=== Draw ===
First round
1 | (United States) L Raymond (Australia) R Stubbs | 6 | 6
(Slovenia) T Pisnik (United States) K Schlukebir | 1 | 2
(Australia) C Barclay (United States) L Osterloh | 6 | 7^{7}
(Greece) E Daniilidou (South Africa) K Grant | 1 | 6^{2}
3 | (Switzerland) E Gagliardi (Chinese Taipei) J Lee | 2 | 6^{4}
(France) C Dhenin (Slovenia) M Matevžič | 6 | 7^{7}
WC | (France) C Beigbeder (Tunisia) S Sfar | 4 | 6 | 6
(Australia) E Domikinovic (Indonesia) A Widjaja | 6 | 4 | 0
(France) S Foretz (France) N Tauziat | 4 | 2
(Germany) K Freye (Japan) R Hiraki | 6 | 6
(Austria) B Schwartz (Germany) J Wöhr | 6 | 6
4 | (Australia) L McShea (Kazakhstan) I Selyutina | 2 | 2
(Czech Republic) D Bedáňová (Germany) M Müller | 6 | 5 | 4
Q | (United States) J Hopkins (Croatia) J Kostanić | 2 | 7 | 6
(Germany) A Barna (New Zealand) S Stephens | 1 | 2
2 | (Federal Republic of Yugoslavia) J Dokic (United States) M Shaughnessy | 6 | 6

Quarterfinals
1 | (United States) L Raymond (Australia) R Stubbs
(Australia) C Barclay (United States) L Osterloh | w/o
(France) C Dhenin (Slovenia) M Matevžič | 6 | 6
WC | (France) C Beigbeder (Tunisia) S Sfar | 4 | 1
(Germany) K Freye (Japan) R Hiraki | 3 | 1
(Austria) B Schwartz (Germany) J Wöhr | 6 | 6
Q | (United States) J Hopkins (Croatia) J Kostanić | 3 | 6 | 6
2 | (Federal Republic of Yugoslavia) J Dokic (United States) M Shaughnessy | 6 | 3 | 4

Semifinals
(Australia) C Barclay (United States) L Osterloh
(France) C Dhenin (Slovenia) M Matevžič | w/o
(Austria) B Schwartz (Germany) J Wöhr | 4 | 3
Q | (United States) J Hopkins (Croatia) J Kostanić | 6 | 6

Final
(France) C Dhenin (Slovenia) M Matevžič | 6 | 4 | 4
Q | (United States) J Hopkins (Croatia) J Kostanić | 0 | 6 | 6
