= Marta Domachowska =

Polish tennis player (born 1986)

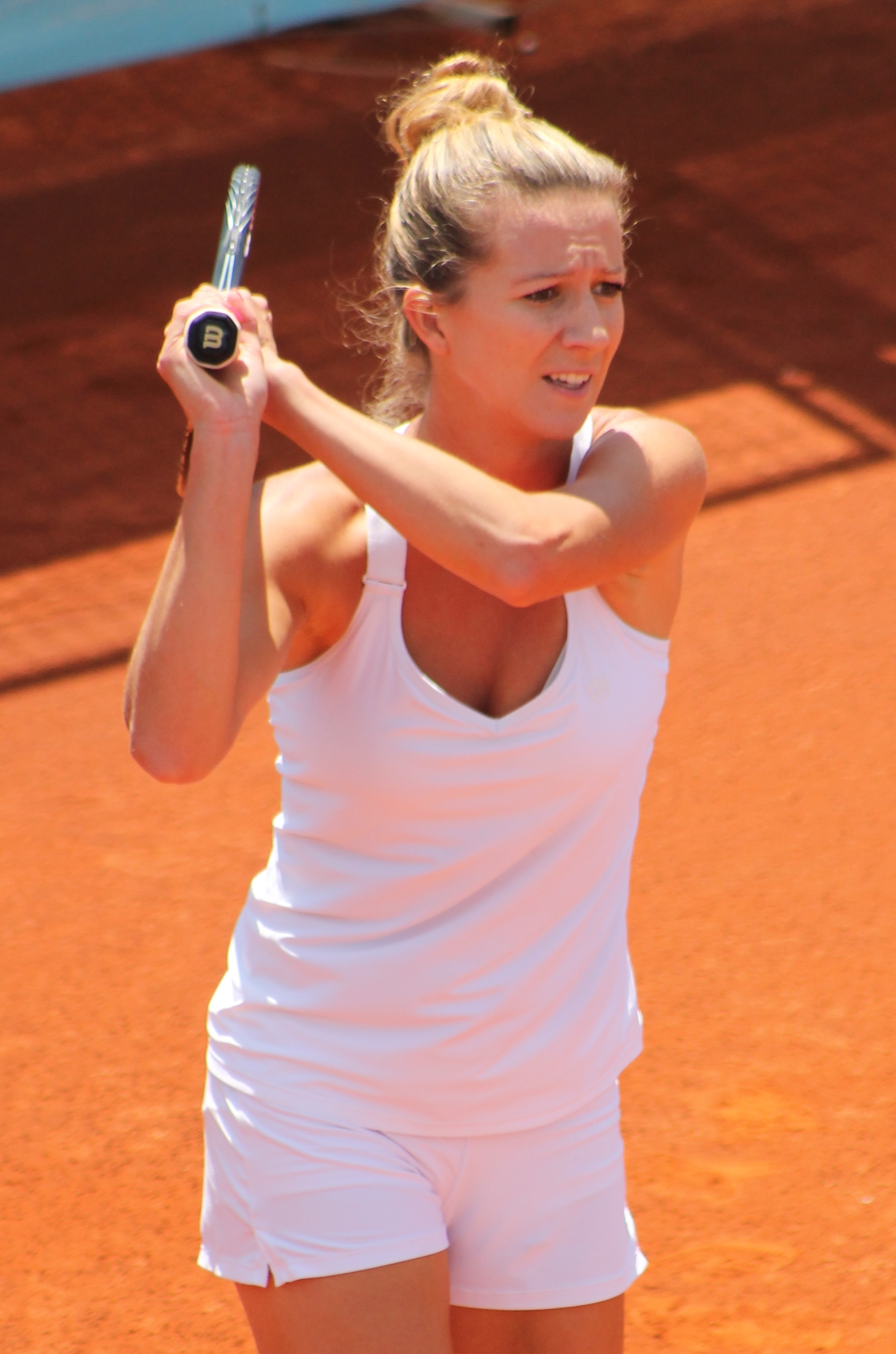
- Domachowska 2014
- Country (sports): Poland
- Residence: Podkowa Leśna
- Born: 16 January 1986 (age 40) Warsaw, Polish People's Republic
- Height: 1.76 m (5 ft 9 in)
- Turned pro: 2001
- Retired: December 2015
- Plays: Right (two-handed backhand)
- Prize money: $1,063,111

Singles
- Career record: 323–249
- Career titles: 8 ITF
- Highest ranking: No. 37 (3 April 2006)

Grand Slam singles results
- Australian Open: 4R (2008)
- French Open: 2R (2005, 2008)
- Wimbledon: 2R (2008)
- US Open: 1R (2005, 2006, 2008, 2009)

Doubles
- Career record: 117–130
- Career titles: 1 WTA, 5 ITF
- Highest ranking: No. 62 (30 January 2006)

Marta Domachowska (Polish pronunciation: [ˈmarta dɔmaˈxɔfska]; born 16 January 1986) is a former tennis player from Poland.

She was 2006 ranked world No. 37 in singles and No. 62 in doubles, and reached 2008 Australian Open fourth round in singles and won the Canberra International in doubles with Roberta Vinci in 2006. She also reached three WTA Tour singles finals at the 2004 Korea Open (lost to Maria Sharapova), 2005 Internationaux de Strasbourg (lost to Anabel Medina Garrigues) and 2006 U.S. National Indoor Championships (lost to Sofia Arvidsson). She was 2003 Australian Open semifinalist in girls' singles, represented Poland at the 2008 Summer Olympics and was member of Poland Fed Cup team. Domachowska was the best female Polish tennis player, after Magdalena Grzybowska's retirement and before Agnieszka Radwańska's successes.

== Juniors ==
Marta started playing tennis at age seven, and reached the semifinals of the Australian Open Junior Championships in 2003.

== Professional ==
=== 2001–2006 ===
In her sole appearance at a WTA Tour tournament in 2001, as an unranked wildcard in Sopot qualifying, she lost in the first round. 2002 marked her second Tour appearance, as an unranked wildcard in Warsaw. During the year she reached the doubles semifinals in Sopot and won first her first two ITF singles titles along with her first doubles title. She debuted on WTA rankings on May 20 at No. 745 and amassed a 29–12 ITF singles record (finished as No. 356) and 9–7 doubles record. She again accepted a wildcard at Warsaw, and also at Sopot in 2003, where she won the first round of both. She won her third singles title and finished the season ranked No. 244 in singles.

In 2004, she won two more ITF titles and reached a WTA tournament final in Seoul. She defeated Anna Smashnova to reach the semifinals in Sopot, and reached the quarterfinals in Casablanca. She made her debut in the top 100 (at No. 100) on 27 September 2004. Even though she failed to qualify for the French Open, Wimbledon and US Open, she compiled a 42–20 singles record and 12–9 doubles record, finishing the season ranked No. 74 in singles.

2005 was the best year for Domachowska results-wise. She was runner-up in the Tier-III tournament in Strasbourg and reached the semifinals in Beijing, a Tier II event. She made her debut in the main draw of all four majors and made her debut in the top 50 (at No. 48) on June 6. She was runner-up in two doubles tournaments. Although, she had to withdraw from Hyderabad and Memphis, after spraining her right shoulder. Her record for the year was 24–26 in singles (finishing the year No. 60) and 14–16 in doubles.

She won her first WTA Tour title in 2006 with (Roberta Vinci) in a tournament in Canberra. She reached a singles final in Memphis and achieved a new singles career-high of No. 37 on 3 April. She and Sania Mirza finished runners-up in Cincinnati, and with Marion Bartoli, she reached the semifinals in Stanford. But she failed to advance past the first round in all four majors, and withdrew at Charleston, and Bali due to injuries. Poor results in Beijing and Seoul resulted in her finishing the year at No. 90.

=== 2007–2015 ===
After not playing Memphis in 2007, her ranking dropped to No. 166. As a result, she played multiple ITF-level tournaments, reaching the semifinals in one instance. She managed to qualify for the Seoul and Stockholm WTA tournaments, but failed to qualify for nine WTA events (including two majors), and lacked a win at all in Grand Slams that year. As the world No. 179, and as a qualifier, she won a $100,000 tournament in Poitiers, defeating Anna Lapushchenkova. It was her first singles title since 2003 and the biggest tournament win in her career. She won an ITF doubles title in Rome, and finished No. 143 in singles and No. 240 in doubles for the year.

In the 2008 Australian Open, she achieved her best grand slam result, reaching the fourth round, before she lost to Venus Williams. Due to this result, Domachowska returned to the top 100 (at No. 82). Domachowska also represented Poland in the singles draw at the 2008 Summer Olympics in Beijing, where she lost in the first round. She finished year at No. 56.

In 2009 in singles, she lost in the first round of all four Grand Slam tournaments, including the US Open as a qualifier. Domachowska, however, did manage to reach the singles quarterfinals of Istanbul.

In March 2013, she posed for the Polish edition of Playboy.

In December 2015, she retired from professional tennis. She later went into coaching assistant activities, becoming the hitting partner of Caroline Wozniacki in 2014.

=== 2022: Possible comeback ===
In late 2021, it was announced by the International Tennis Federation that Domachowska would be eligible to compete again from January 2022.

== Personal life ==
Marta was born to Barbara and Wiesław and currently resides in Podkowa Leśna, Poland. She has an older sister, Magdalena. Domachowska speaks Polish, English, Russian and Spanish. Other than tennis, she enjoys sports such as football and swimming.

She has been in a relationship with Polish tennis player Jerzy Janowicz since 2013. They announced her first pregnancy on 24 December 2018 via Instagram, and she gave birth to their son Filip Janowicz on 1 January 2019.

== WTA Tour finals ==
=== Singles: 3 (3 runner-ups) ===
Legend Tier I Tier II Tier III, IV & V (0–3)	Finals by surface Hard (0–2) Clay (0–1)

Result	W/L	Date	Tournament	Surface	Opponent	Score
Loss	1.	Sep 2004	Korea Open, South Korea	Hard	(Russia) Maria Sharapova	1–6, 1–6
Loss	2.	May 2005	Internationaux de Strasbourg, France	Clay	(Spain) Anabel Medina Garrigues	4–6, 3–6
Loss	3.	Feb 2006	Memphis Cup, United States	Hard (i)	(Sweden) Sofia Arvidsson	2–6, 6–2, 3–6

=== Doubles: 5 (1 title, 4 runner-ups) ===
Legend Tier I Tier II Tier III, IV & V (1–4)	Finals by surface Hard (1–3) Clay (0–1)

Result	W/L	Date	Tournament	Surface	Partner	Opponents	Score
Loss	1.	Jan 2005	Pattaya Open, Thailand	Hard	(Croatia) Silvija Talaja	(Spain) Rosa María Andrés Rodríguez (Romania) Andreea Vanc	3–6, 1–6
Loss	2.	May 2005	Internationaux de Strasbourg, France	Clay	(Germany) Marlene Weingärtner	(France) Marion Bartoli (Germany) Anna-Lena Grönefeld	3–6, 2–6
Win	1.	Jan 2006	Canberra International, Australia	Hard	(Italy) Roberta Vinci	(United Kingdom) Claire Curran (Latvia) Līga Dekmeijere	7–6^{(5)}, 6–3
Loss	3.	Jul 2006	Cincinnati Open, United States	Hard	(India) Sania Mirza	(Argentina) Gisela Dulko (Italy) Maria Elena Camerin	4–6, 6–3, 2–6
Loss	4.	Sep 2008	Bali Classic, Indonesia	Hard	(Russia) Nadia Petrova	(Chinese Taipei) Hsieh Su-wei (China) Peng Shuai	7–6^{(4)}, 6–7^{(3)}, [7–10]

== ITF Circuit finals ==
Legend
$100,000 tournaments
$75,000 tournaments
$50,000 tournaments
$25,000 tournaments
$10,000 tournaments

=== Singles: 14 (8–6) ===
Result	No.	Date	Tournament	Surface	Opponent	Score
Win	1.	11 August 2002	ITF Olecko, Poland	Clay	(Romania) Liana Ungur	1–6, 6–3, 6–1
Loss	1.	5 August 2002	ITF Gdynia, Poland	Clay	(Romania) Delia Sescioreanu	6–7, 1–6
Win	2.	3 November 2002	ITF Stockholm, Sweden	Hard (i)	(Germany) Sabrina Jolk	6–3, 6–4
Win	3.	13 July 2003	ITF Toruń, Poland	Clay	(Belarus) Anastasiya Yakimova	7–5, 3–6, 6–4
Loss	2.	20 October 2003	ITF Opole, Poland	Carpet (i)	(Belarus) Tatsiana Uvarova	4–6, 6–3, 4–6
Win	4.	1 February 2004	ITF Belfort, France	Hard (i)	(Germany) Adriana Barna	3–6, 6–0, 6–0
Win	5.	15 February 2004	ITF Warsaw, Poland	Carpet (i)	(Germany) Angelique Kerber	7–6^{(5)}, 3–6, 6–3
Loss	3.	5 February 2006	ITF Ortisei, Italy	Carpet (i)	(Czech Republic) Eva Birnerová	6–4, 5–7, 2–6
Win	6.	25 November 2007	ITF Poitiers, France	Hard (i)	(Russia) Anna Lapushchenkova	7–5, 6–0
Win	7.	30 January 2011	Open de l'Isère, France	Hard (i)	(United Kingdom) Naomi Broady	6–4, 6–4
Loss	4.	21 March 2011	GB Pro-Series Bath, UK	Hard (i)	(Switzerland) Stefanie Vögele	6–7^{(3)}, 7–5, 6–2
Win	8.	13 June 2011	ITF Istanbul, Turkey	Hard	(Georgia (country)) Margalita Chakhnashvili	7–5, 6–3
Loss	5.	24 July 2011	Samsun Cup, Turkey	Hard	(Russia) Yulia Putintseva	7–6^{(6)}, 6–2
Loss	6.	29 October 2011	GB Pro-Series Barnstaple, UK	Hard (i)	(United Kingdom) Anne Keothavong	6–1, 6–3

=== Doubles: 10 (5–5) ===
Result	No.	Date	Tournament	Surface	Partner	Opponents	Score
Win	1.	3 November 2002	ITF Stockholm, Sweden	Hard (i)	(Belgium) Elke Clijsters	(Sweden) Jenny Loow (Netherlands) Suzanne van Hartingsveldt	6–1, 6–1
Loss	1.	16 May 2004	Open Saint-Gaudens, France	Clay	(Argentina) Natalia Gussoni	(Romania) Ruxandra Dragomir-Ilie (Romania) Andreea Vanc	6–3, 6–1
Win	2.	12 May 2007	ITF Roma, Italy	Clay	(Finland) Emma Laine	(Estonia) Maret Ani (Belgium) Caroline Maes	1–0 ret.
Loss	2.	26 October 2009	ITF Poitiers, France	Hard (i)	(Netherlands) Michaëlla Krajicek	(France) Julie Coin (Canada) Marie-Ève Pelletier	3–6, 6–3, [3–10]
Loss	3.	4 February 2011	ITF Sutton, UK	Hard (i)	(Croatia) Darija Jurak	(Finland) Emma Laine (United Kingdom) Melanie South	3–6, 7–5, [8–10]
Loss	4.	21 March 2011	GB Pro-Series Bath, UK	Hard (i)	(Poland) Katarzyna Piter	(Hungary) Tímea Babos (Luxembourg) Anne Kremer	7–6^{(5)}, 6–2
Win	3.	13 June 2011	ITF Istanbul, Turkey	Hard	(Serbia) Teodora Mirčić	(Australia) Daniella Dominikovic (Turkey) Melis Sezer	6–4, 6–2
Loss	5.	30 July 2012	Empire Slovak Open	Clay	(Austria) Sandra Klemenschits	(Romania) Elena Bogdan (Czech Republic) Renata Voráčová	6–7, 4–6
Win	4.	23 September 2013	ITF Clermont-Ferrand, France	Hard (i)	(Netherlands) Michaëlla Krajicek	(Russia) Margarita Gasparyan (Ukraine) Alyona Sotnikova	5–7, 6–4, [10–8]
Win	5.	21 October 2013	Challenger de Saguenay, Canada	Hard (i)	(Czech Republic) Andrea Hlaváčková	(Canada) Françoise Abanda (United States) Victoria Duval	7–5, 6–3

== Grand Slam singles performance timeline ==
Key
W	F	SF	QF	#R	RR	Q#	DNQ	A	NH

(W) winner; (F) finalist; (SF) semifinalist; (QF) quarterfinalist; (#R) rounds 4, 3, 2, 1; (RR) round-robin stage; (Q#) qualification round; (DNQ) did not qualify; (A) absent; (NH) not held; (SR) strike rate (events won / competed); (W–L) win–loss record.

Tournament	2004	2005	2006	2007	2008	2009	2010	2011	2012	W–L
Australian Open	A	2R	1R	1R	4R	1R	Q1	A	Q2	4–5
French Open	Q1	2R	1R	Q1	2R	1R	Q2	A	Q1	2–4
Wimbledon	Q2	1R	1R	A	2R	1R	A	A	Q1	1–4
US Open	Q3	1R	1R	Q2	1R	1R	Q1	Q3	Q1	0–4
Win–Loss	0–0	2–4	0–4	0–1	5–4	0–4	0–0	0–0	0–0	7–17
Year-end ranking	74	60	90	143	180	140	299	157	225	N/A
