= Maja Matevžič =

Slovenian tennis player

- Country (sports): (Slovenia)
- Residence: Ljubljana, Slovenia
- Born: 13 June 1980 (age 46) Ljubljana, SFR Yugoslavia
- Height: 1.75 m (5 ft 9 in)
- Turned pro: 2000
- Retired: 2006
- Plays: Left-handed (two-handed backhand)
- Prize money: $593,426

Singles
- Career record: 199–149
- Career titles: 1 WTA 4 ITF
- Highest ranking: 38 (25 August 2003)

Grand Slam singles results
- Australian Open: 2R (2003)
- French Open: 2R (2003)
- Wimbledon: 3R (2002, 2003)
- US Open: 3R (2001)

Doubles
- Career record: 105–100
- Career titles: 2 WTA 5 ITF
- Highest ranking: 34 (23 June 2003)

Grand Slam doubles results
- Australian Open: 2R (2001, 2003)
- French Open: QF (2003)
- Wimbledon: QF (2001)
- US Open: 3R (2002, 2003)

Team competitions
- Fed Cup: 10–5

Maja Matevžič (born 13 June 1980) is a former professional tennis player from Slovenia. Both her most recent WTA Tour singles and doubles matches were played on 21 August 2005 at Toronto.

She retired because of injuries in September 2006. Her last tournament was in Portorož, Slovenia, where she played doubles with Tina Križan.

Matevžič wanted to open a tennis school in Slovenia. She would like pass on her knowledge to boys and girls in her country.

== WTA career finals ==
=== Singles: 1 (1 title) ===
Legend
Tier I (0–0)
Tier II (0–0)
Tier III (0–0)
Tier IV & V (1–0)

Result	No.	Date	Tournament	Surface	Opponent	Score
Win	1.	Oct 2002	Bratislava, Slovakia	Hard (i)	(Czech Republic) Iveta Benešová	6–0, 6–1

=== Doubles: 3 (2 titles, 1 runner-up) ===
Legend
Tier I (0–0)
Tier II (0–0)
Tier III (1–1)
Tier IV & V (1–0)

Result	No.	Date	Tournament	Surface	Partner	Opponents	Score
Loss	1.	May 2002	Strasbourg, France	Clay	(France) Caroline Dhenin	(United States) Jennifer Hopkins (Croatia) Jelena Kostanić Tošić	6–0, 4–6, 4–6
Win	2.	Oct 2002	Bratislava, Slovakia	Hard (i)	(Slovakia) Henrieta Nagyová	(United States) Meilen Tu (France) Nathalie Dechy	6–4, 6–0
Win	3.	May 2003	Strasbourg, France	Clay	(Canada) Sonya Jeyaseelan	(United States) Laura Granville (Croatia) Jelena Kostanić Tošić	6–4, 6–4

== ITF Circuit finals ==
$100,000 tournaments
$75,000 tournaments
$50,000 tournaments
$25,000 tournaments
$10,000 tournaments

=== Singles: 7 (4–3) ===
Result	No.	Date	Tournament	Surface	Opponent	Score
Loss	1.	31 May 1998	ITF San Severino, Italy	Clay	(Belgium) Patty Van Acker	5–7, 3–6
Win	2.	28 May 2000	ITF Biella, Italy	Clay	(Italy) Nathalie Viérin	6–0, 6–2
Loss	3.	10 September 2000	ITF Fano, Italy	Clay	(Italy) Flora Perfetti	3–6, 4–6
Win	4.	5 March 2001	ITF Urtijëi, Italy	Hard (i)	(Russia) Ekaterina Kozhokina	6–7^{(3–7)}, 6–3, 6–3
Win	5.	22 July 2001	ITF Modena, Italy	Clay	(Estonia) Kaia Kanepi	7–5, 7–6^{(7–5)}
Win	6.	29 July 2001	ITF Ettenheim, Germany	Clay	(Estonia) Kaia Kanepi	6–2, 6–3
Loss	7.	4 August 2002	ITF Saint-Gaudens, France	Clay	(Argentina) Mariana Díaz Oliva	4–6, 1–6

=== Doubles: 12 (5–7) ===
Result	No.	Date	Tournament	Surface	Partner	Opponents	Score
Loss	1.	31 May 1998	ITF San Severino, Italy	Clay	(Slovenia) Ana Škafar	(United States) Rebecca Jensen (Croatia) Kristina Pojatina	w/o
Loss	2.	9 May 1999	ITF Verona, Italy	Clay	(Federal Republic of Yugoslavia) Dragana Ilić	(Argentina) Melisa Arévalo (Argentina) Sabrina Valenti	6–7, 6–7
Win	3.	17 May 1999	ITF Pesaro, Italy	Clay	(Federal Republic of Yugoslavia) Dragana Ilić	(Croatia) Marijana Kovačević (Russia) Ekaterina Sysoeva	6–4, 6–3
Win	4.	17 October 1999	ITF Welwyn, United Kingdom	Hard (i)	(Federal Republic of Yugoslavia) Dragana Zarić	(Romania) Magda Mihalache (Slovakia) Zuzana Váleková	7–6^{(7–1)}, 5–7, 6–2
Win	5.	7 November 1999	ITF Saint-Raphaël, France	Hard (i)	(Italy) Valentina Sassi	(France) Victoria Courmes-Benedetti (France) Laëtitia Sanchez	6–3, 6–1
Loss	6.	29 May 2000	ITF Modena, Italy	Clay	(Slovenia) Tina Hergold	(Spain) Lourdes Domínguez Lino (Spain) María José Martínez Sánchez	4–6, 6–4, 3–6
Loss	7.	25 June 2000	ITF Gorizia, Italy	Clay	(Federal Republic of Yugoslavia) Dragana Zarić	(Brazil) Vanessa Menga (Spain) Alicia Ortuño	6–4, 4–6, 1–6
Win	8.	10 July 2000	ITF Darmstadt, Germany	Clay	(Italy) Maria Paola Zavagli	(Germany) Adriana Barna (Ukraine) Anna Zaporozhanova	7–6^{(7–4)}, 6–7^{(4–7)}, 6–4
Loss	9.	23 July 2000	ITF Fontanafredda, Italy	Clay	(Italy) Antonella Serra Zanetti	(Spain) Rosa María Andrés Rodríguez (Spain) Conchita Martínez Granados	6–4, 2–6, 4–6
Loss	10.	8 October 2000	ITF Makarska, Croatia	Clay	(Croatia) Maja Palaveršić	(Czech Republic) Eva Martincová (Czech Republic) Alena Vašková	2–4, 1–4, 4–2, 2–4
Loss	11.	4 December 2000	ITF Cergy-Pontoise, France	Hard (i)	(Germany) Caroline Schneider	(Belgium) Justine Henin (France) Virginie Razzano	2–6, 4–6
Win	12.	23 July 2001	ITF Ettenheim, Germany	Clay	(Denmark) Eva Dyrberg	(Hungary) Katalin Marosi (Kazakhstan) Irina Selyutina	w/o
