= Stéphanie Cohen-Aloro =

French tennis player (born 1983)

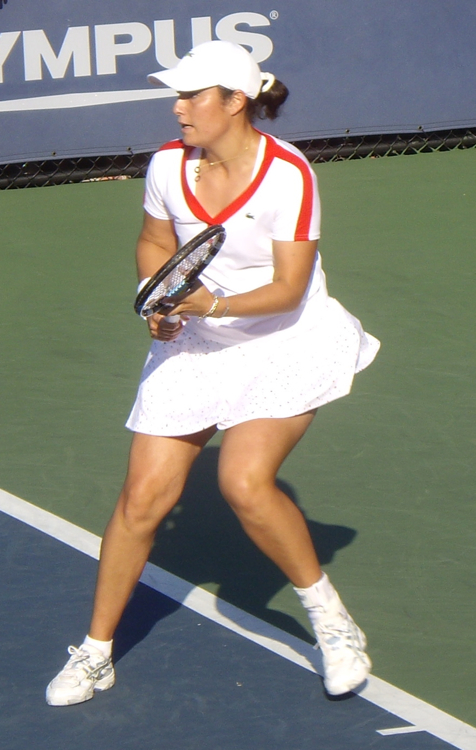
- Country (sports): France
- Residence: Seine, France
- Born: 18 March 1983 (age 42); Paris
- Height: 1.75 m (5 ft 9 in)
- Turned pro: 15 October 2001
- Retired: 12 February 2011
- Plays: Right (one-handed backhand)
- Prize money: US$ 1,080,922

Singles
- Career record: 294–251
- Career titles: 7 ITF
- Highest ranking: No. 61 (23 October 2003)

Grand Slam singles results
- Australian Open: 2R (2005, 2009)
- French Open: 3R (2007)
- Wimbledon: 1R (2003, 2004, 2008)
- US Open: 2R (2003)

Doubles
- Career record: 135–118
- Career titles: 12 ITF
- Highest ranking: No. 54 (18 July 2005)

Team competitions
- Fed Cup: W (2003)

Stéphanie Cohen-Aloro (born 18 March 1983) is a former professional tennis player from France.

Her career-high singles ranking is world No. 61, achieved on 5 October 2003. Her highest doubles ranking position of 54, she set on 18 July 2005.

Cohen-Aloro won seven singles and twelve doubles titles on tournaments of the ITF Women's Circuit.

== Career ==
Cohen-Aloro turned professional on 15 October 2001, at the age of 18.

In April 2005, she beat world No. 21, Daniela Hantuchová, in Miami in two sets. Cohen-Aloro upset heavy favorite Mary Pierce (seeded 24 and ranked No. 29 in the world) in the first round of the 2005 Australian Open, 6–2, 6–2.

Cohen-Aloro and Tunisian Selima Sfar pulled off a major upset in the first round of the 2005 Wimbledon Championships ladies' doubles, beating third seeds Lisa Raymond and Rennae Stubbs, 6–4, 3–6, 6–2. However, they lost in the second round.

In 2006, she captured her fifth career ITF singles title at the $25k Biarritz, and won the ninth ITF Circuit doubles title at the $50k Open de Touraine with María José Martínez Sánchez.

On 12 February 2011, she played her last professional match, losing in the semifinals of the Open GDF Suez doubles event to Bethanie Mattek-Sands and Meghann Shaughnessy. Two days earlier in the same tournament, she had played her last singles match, losing to Mattek-Sands in the second round of the main draw.

== WTA Tour finals ==
=== Doubles: 1 (runner-up) ===
Legend
Tier I
Tier II
Tier III, IV & V

Result	Date	Tournament	Surface	Partner	Opponents	Score
Loss	Feb 2003	Open Gaz de France, Paris	Carpet (i)	(France) Marion Bartoli	(Austria) Barbara Schett (Switzerland) Patty Schnyder	6–2, 2–6, 6–7^{(5–7)}

== ITF Circuit finals ==
$100,000 tournaments
$75,000 tournaments
$50,000 tournaments
$25,000 tournaments
$10,000 tournaments

=== Singles: 10 (7–3) ===
Result	No.	Date	Tournament	Surface	Opponent	Score
Win	1.	9 December 2001	ITF Nonthaburi, Thailand	Hard	(France) Marina Caiazzo	6–4, 7–5
Win	2.	13 October 2002	ITF Cardiff, Great Britain	Hard (i)	(Czech Republic) Sandra Kleinová	6–1, 6–1
Win	3.	1 December 2002	ITF Mount Gambier, Australia	Hard	(Hungary) Melinda Czink	6–4, 6–2
Win	4.	4 May 2003	Open de Cagnes-sur-Mer, France	Clay	(Ukraine) Yulia Beygelzimer	6–4, 6–3
Loss	1.	24 October 2004	Open de Saint-Raphaël, France	Hard (i)	(Czech Republic) Barbora Strýcová	1–6, 2–6
Win	5.	16 April 2006	Open de Biarritz, France	Clay	(Romania) Mădălina Gojnea	6–7^{(1)}, 6–4, 6–4
Loss	2.	17 June 2007	Open de Marseille, France	Clay	(Argentina) Jorgelina Cravero	2–6, 4–6
Win	6.	20 April 2008	Open de Saint-Malo, France	Clay	(Croatia) Jelena Kostanić Tošić	6–2, 7–5
Win	7.	13 September 2009	Denain Open, France	Clay	(Russia) Ksenia Pervak	6–3, 6–4
Loss	3.	12 September 2010	Denain Open, France	Clay	(France) Anaïs Laurendon	3–6, 5–7

=== Doubles: 23 (12–11) ===
Result	No.	Date	Tournament	Surface	Partner	Opponents	Score
Win	1.	15 September 2001	ITF Madrid, Spain	Clay	(France) Kildine Chevalier	(Spain) Sonia Delgado (Italy) Anna Floris	2–6, 6–2, 6–2
Win	2.	5 May 2002	Open de Cagnes-sur-Mer, France	Clay	(Madagascar) Dally Randriantefy	(Czech Republic) Iveta Benešová (France) Caroline Dhenin	6–2, 6–4
Loss	1.	28 July 2002	ITF Les Contamines, France	Hard	(France) Anne-Laure Heitz	(Russia) Maria Kondratieva (Serbia and Montenegro) Katarina Mišić	1–6, 6–7^{(4)}
Win	3.	18 July 2004	ITF Vittel, France	Clay	(France) Séverine Beltrame	(Russia) Maria Goloviznina (Sweden) Maria Wolfbrandt	6–1, 6–3
Win	4.	19 September 2004	ITF Bordeaux, France	Clay	(Tunisia) Selima Sfar	(Argentina) Erica Krauth (Germany) Jasmin Wöhr	3–6, 6–3, 6–3
Loss	2.	17 October 2004	Open de Touraine, France	Carpet (i)	(Tunisia) Selima Sfar	(Czech Republic) Květa Peschke (Germany) Angelika Rösch	w/o
Win	5.	23 October 2004	Open de Saint-Raphaël, France	Hard (i)	(Tunisia) Selima Sfar	(Czech Republic) Barbora Strýcová (Kazakhstan) Galina Voskoboeva	7–6^{(3)}, 2–6, 6–4
Win	6.	28 November 2004	ITF Poitiers, France	Hard (i)	(Tunisia) Selima Sfar	(Czech Republic) Gabriela Chmelinová (Czech Republic) Michaela Paštiková	7–5, 6–4
Win	7.	17 April 2005	Open de Biarritz, France	Clay	(Tunisia) Selima Sfar	(Switzerland) Timea Bacsinszky (France) Aurélie Védy	6–2, 6–1
Win	8.	19 November 2005	ITF Deauville, France	Clay (i)	(Tunisia) Selima Sfar	(Ukraine) Alona Bondarenko (Ukraine) Kateryna Bondarenko	6–3, 6–1
Loss	3.	18 June 2006	Open de Marseille, France	Clay	(France) Séverine Beltrame	(Spain) Conchita Martínez Granados (Spain) María José Martínez Sánchez	5–7, 4–6
Win	9.	14 October 2006	Open de Touraine, France	Hard (i)	(Spain) María José Martínez Sánchez	(Czech Republic) Barbora Strýcová (Czech Republic) Renata Voráčová	7–5, 7–5
Loss	4.	31 March 2007	ITF Latina, Italy	Hard	(Tunisia) Selima Sfar	(Italy) Sara Errani (Italy) Giulia Gabba	3–6, 6–1, 6–7^{(2)}
Loss	5.	6 April 2008	ITF Torhout, Belgium	Hard (i)	(Tunisia) Selima Sfar	(Russia) Anastasia Pavlyuchenkova (Belgium) Yanina Wickmayer	4–6, 6–4, [8–10]
Loss	6.	7 September 2008	Denain Open, France	Clay	(Canada) Marie-Ève Pelletier	(Estonia) Maret Ani (Spain) Lourdes Domínguez Lino	0–6, 5–7
Loss	7.	19 July 2009	Contrexéville Open, France	Clay	(France) Pauline Parmentier	(Austria) Yvonne Meusburger (Germany) Kathrin Wörle	2–6, 2–6
Win	10.	26 July 2009	ITF Pétange, Luxembourg	Clay	(Tunisia) Selima Sfar	(Croatia) Darija Jurak (Germany) Kathrin Wörle	6–2, 3–6, [10–7]
Loss	8.	17 October 2009	Open de Touraine, France	Hard (i)	(France) Aurélie Védy	(France) Youlia Fedossova (Tunisia) Selima Sfar	6–4, 0–6, [8–10]
Win	11.	28 February 2010	Biberach Open, Germany	Hard (i)	(Tunisia) Selima Sfar	(Germany) Mona Barthel (Germany) Carmen Klaschka	5–7, 6–1, [10–5]
Loss	9.	2 May 2010	Open de Cagnes-sur-Mer, France	Clay	(France) Kristina Mladenovic	(Bosnia and Herzegovina) Mervana Jugić-Salkić (Croatia) Darija Jurak	6–0, 2–6, [5–10]
Loss	10.	12 June 2010	Open de Marseille, France	Clay	(France) Aurélie Védy	(Sweden) Johanna Larsson (Austria) Yvonne Meusburger	4–6, 2–6
Loss	11.	17 October 2010	Open de Touraine, France	Hard (i)	(Tunisia) Selima Sfar	(Germany) Tatjana Malek (France) Irena Pavlovic	4–6, 7–5, [8–10]
Win	12.	30 January 2011	Open de l'Isère, France	Hard (i)	(Tunisia) Selima Sfar	(France) Iryna Brémond (France) Aurélie Védy	6–1, 6–3

== Personal ==
Cohen-Aloro is Jewish.

== See also ==
- List of select Jewish tennis players
