= 2012 Serena Williams tennis season =

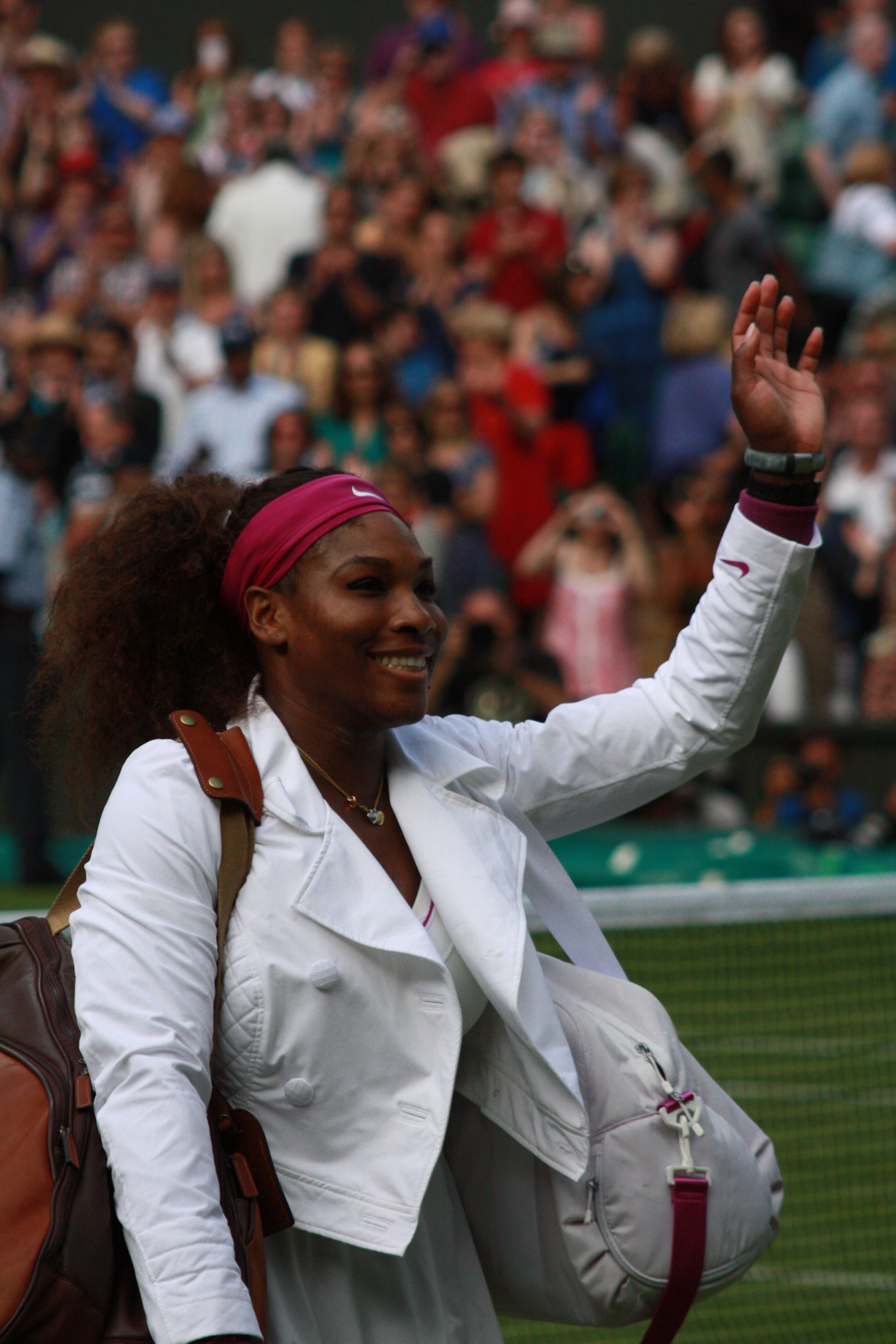
- Serena Williams at the Wimbledon Championships
- Full name: Serena Jameka Williams
- Country: United States
- Calendar prize money: $7,045,975

Singles
- Season record: 58–4 (93.55%)
- Calendar titles: 7
- Year-end ranking: No. 3
- Ranking change from previous year: ▲9

Grand Slam & significant results
- Australian Open: 4R
- French Open: 1R
- Wimbledon: W
- US Open: W
- Tour Finals: W
- Olympic Games: Gold Medal

Doubles
- Season record: 13–1 (92.86%)
- Calendar titles: 2
- Year-end ranking: No. 35
- Ranking change from previous year: ▲NR

Grand Slam doubles results
- Wimbledon: W
- US Open: 3R
- Olympic Games: Gold Medal

Mixed doubles
- Season record: 0–1 (0.0%)

Grand Slam mixed doubles results
- French Open: 1R

Fed Cup
- Fed Cup: WG Play-offs (Adv. to 2013 WG)
- Last updated on: 29 October 2012.

The 2012 Serena Williams tennis season officially began on 2 January with the start of the 2012 WTA Tour. Williams won the most WTA singles titles of the season with seven, including two majors at Wimbledon and the US Open. She also won the WTA Championships and her first singles Olympics gold. She also suffered her first opening-round loss in a major at the French Open, losing to Virginie Razzano.

In doubles, Williams, partnering with sister Venus, dominated the grass court season by triumphing at Wimbledon and winning women's doubles gold medal at the Summer Olympics. Serena Williams was voted WTA Player of the Year for 2012, the fourth time she won the award. Based on her performance for the season, Williams was named as the International Tennis Federation world champion.

== Year in detail ==
=== Early hard court season and Australian Open ===
==== Brisbane International ====
Williams began her 2012 season at the Brisbane International where she defeated Chanelle Scheepers in the first round in straight sets. At the second round, she faced Bojana Jovanovski and served for the match when she twisted her left ankle. She eventually won the match breaking the Serbians serve in the tenth game. However, the next day, she withdrew in her quarterfinals match against Daniela Hantuchová due to the same injury.

==== Australian Open ====
Williams then played the Australian Open where she was on a 14-match winning streak after winning the event in 2009 and 2010 but missing the 2011 edition. She was able to cruise pass the first three rounds. She beat Austrian Tamira Paszek in straight sets hitting 34 winners but also made 26 unforced error, in a first round match that started 30 minutes to 12 midnight. At the second round, she defeated Barbora Záhlavová-Strýcová winning the first set at love and breaking serve once and by doing so, she earned her 500th tour win. She then cruise pass Hungarian Gréta Arn with a loss of only 2 games to make through the fourth round. The match ended with 2 double faults and 59 minutes. At the fourth round, she suffered a surprising loss to Russian Ekaterina Makarova at the fourth match point of the Russian. At the time, Makarova was the lowest ranked player left in the draw. Williams hit 37 unforced errors and 7 double faults in 2 sets. The loss ended her 17 match winning streak at the Open.

She originally was set to participate in mixed doubles partnering with Andy Roddick. The team withdrew before their first round match due to Roddick's hamstring injury.

==== Sony Ericsson Open ====
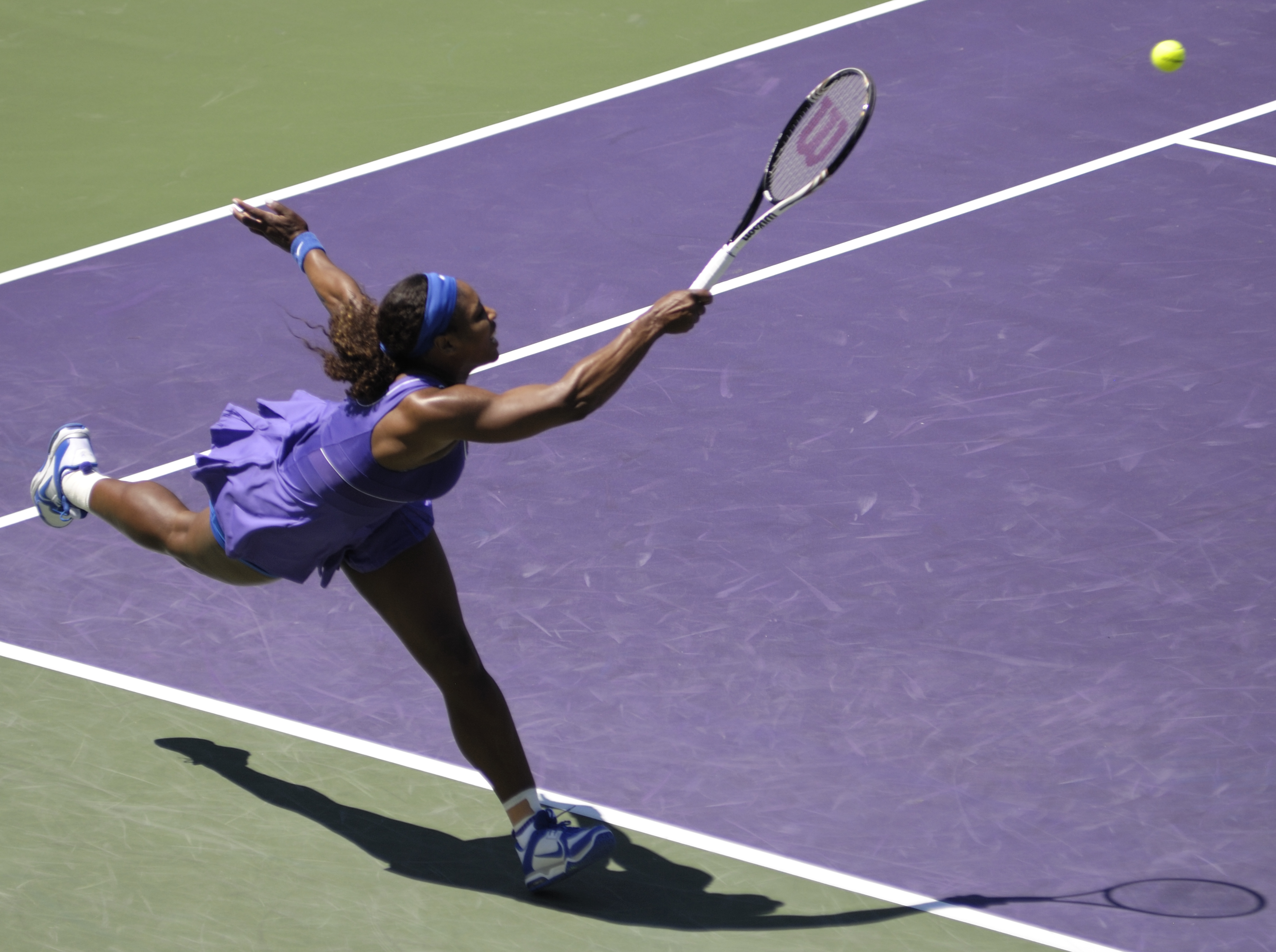
Serena Williams at the Sony Ericsson Open.

Coming into the Sony Ericsson Open, Williams was attempting to break the record she shares with Steffi Graf of 5 titles and 7 finals at the event. She was also returning after a two-year hiatus with the 2009 edition was the latest edition she participated in. As the tenth seed, she received a bye in the first round. In the second round, she faced China's Zhang Shuai and won easily with 6 aces. She followed it up with a loss of only three games over Roberta Vinci. In the fourth round, she faced Samantha Stosur. Avenging her loss at the final of the 2011 US Open, she beat the Australian in two tight sets, while also serving 20 aces in the win, the most aces she has served in a match. Coming into her quarterfinals match-up against Caroline Wozniacki, she was the favorite as she had never lost to the Dane with a 3–0 record. However, she lost winning four games in both sets in an error-stricken match where she committed 34 winners and 36 unforced errors to Wozniacki's 12 winners and 13 unforced errors.

=== Clay court season and French Open ===
==== Family Circle Cup ====
Williams started her clay season campaign at the Family Circle Cup, having not played on clay since the 2010 French Open. As the fifth seed, she received a bye in the first round. In the second round, she faced Elena Vesnina and won with a break lead in each set, closing out the match win her 11th ace. In the next round, she faced New Zealand's Marina Erakovic and won with a double fault from Erakovic and with Serena winning 10 of the last 12 games. In her quarterfinals match, her opponent, Sabine Lisicki, had to retire after twisting her left ankle at 3rd game. In the semifinals, she faced Samantha Stosur whom just outlasted Venus Williams in her quarterfinals match. Williams dominated the match with a double breadstick win in just under an hour and breaking the Aussie five times. In the final, she met Lucie Šafářová for her first title of 2012. Williams dominated the match winning the first 9 games before the Czech got a game to avoid a double bagel defeat, it was the only game the Czech won in the match. With the win, she remained undefeated against the Czech. This was Williams' 40th singles title, second on Charleston and only her fourth on clay.

==== Mutua Madrid Open ====
Williams then played at the blue clay courts of the Mutua Madrid Open. In the first round she met Russian Elena Vesnina and won with 13 aces and 40 winners. In the second round she faced another Russian in Anastasia Pavlyuchenkova and swept pass the Russian with a straight sets victory. She then faced Caroline Wozniacki. Having lost their last match-up at Miami, a sluggish start from Williams looked similar to Miami as Wozniacki won the first set easily losing only one game. However, Williams avenged her loss at Miami and got back, winning the next two sets with 43 winners. In the quarterfinals she faced her third Russian opponent in the tournament, Maria Sharapova, with whom she had a 7–2 lead against Sharapova. Williams continued her streak with a victory and 11 aces. In the semifinals she ended the run of Czech qualifier, Lucie Hradecká. The first set was a tight contest with Williams edging Hradecká in the tie-break. The second set was a contrast with Williams winning with a bagel. In the final, she faced world no. 1, Victoria Azarenka, and dominated the match losing only four games in the victory. Williams hit 13 aces in the match and she also improved her record against Belarusian to 7–1. This was her 41st title putting her second in most titles among active players along with Kim Clijsters and behind her sister, Venus Williams, with 43. The win also moved her from 9th to 6th in the rankings.

==== Internazionali BNL d'Italia ====
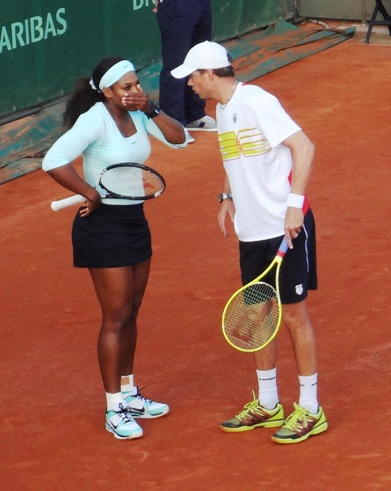
Williams and Bob Bryan during their mixed doubles match pairing at the French Open.

Williams then played the Internazionali BNL d'Italia for her final preparation for the French Open. In the first round, she faced Kazakhstan's Galina Voskoboeva for the first time and won with 24 winners in a late match that started at 10.30 PM. In the next round, she faced a tough match-up in the form of Nadia Petrova where their last four meetings went to deciding set. Williams led their head-to-head 6–3, but Petrova won their last 2 meetings. In the first set, the Russian edged it out winning it with a single break. In the second set being down triple break point on serve in the third game, Williams came back and took control of the match winning the final two sets. In the third round she defeated Anabel Medina Garrigues in straight sets. In the quarterfinals she faced Italian Flavia Pennetta but had an easy pass as Pennetta retired after being down 4–0, 40–0 on Williams serve due to a right wrist injury. Heading into the semifinals Williams led her opponent Li Na 5–1. However, Williams was forced to withdraw with a lower back injury as a precaution heading into the French Open.

==== French Open ====
Williams came to the French Open as the heavy favorite for the title. In the first round, the fifth seeded Williams was drawn against local player ranked 111th in the world, Virginie Razzano. She, surprisingly, lost to the Frenchwoman in three sets, marking the first time she lost in a grandslam opener in her career. Williams was two points away from victory nine times in the second set including leading 5–1 in the tiebreak. However, she failed to capitalize her chances and Razzano took the set and forced a third set to be played. Razzano quickly took control of the third set and, even though Williams managed to save seven match points, she fell to Razzano.

Williams also returned to mixed doubles competition for the first time since the 1999 Australian Open. She played with Bob Bryan and was drawn against Gisela Dulko and Eduardo Schwank in the first round. The pair lost to the Argentinians in a third set match tie-break.

=== Grass court season: Wimbledon Championships and the Olympics ===
==== Wimbledon Championships ====
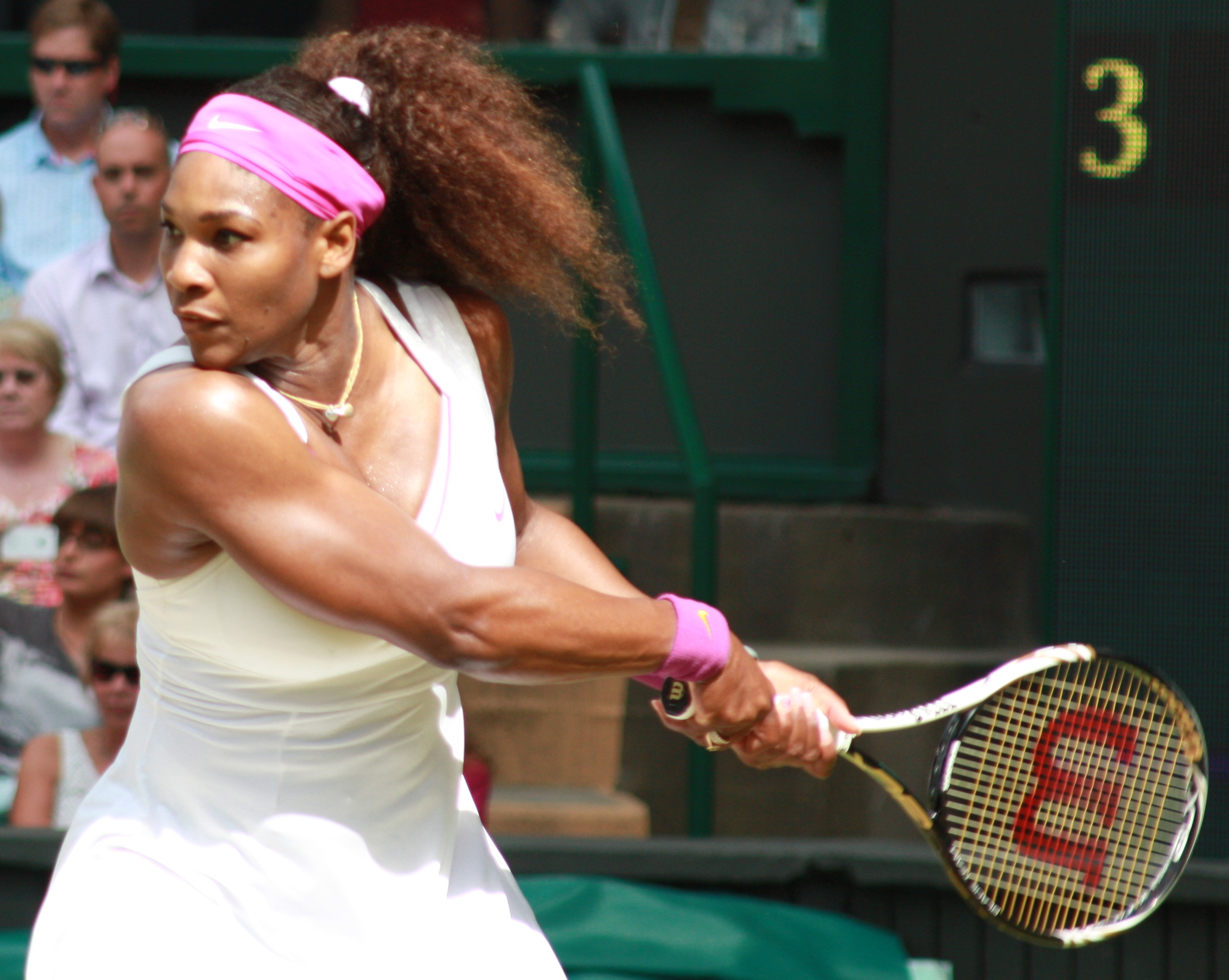
Williams won both the singles and doubles title for the first time since the 2010 Australian Open.

Williams' came into the championships as a co-favorite with world no. 1 and top seed Maria Sharapova. Williams chose to come into the championships with no grass preparation. In the first round, she faced Barbora Záhlavová-Strýcová in No.2 Court, where older sister Venus fell the day before. After her first-round loss at the French Open, Williams looked nervous but still cruised through the first set, winning it with a double break. In the second set, she served for the match in the ninth game just to be broken, but she was able to break back in the next game to win. Her next opponent was Melinda Czink of Hungary; the American breezed pass the Hungarian with 7 aces to take the first set in 19 minutes. The second set was tighter, but Williams prevailed, breaking in the ninth game and then serving it out to advanced to the third round against China's Zheng Jie. Zheng kept toe-to-toe with Williams by holding her serve to force a tie-break, which Zheng won with the aid of a few errors from the American. However, Williams dominated the second set, winning it at two including winning the final 13 points of the set to force it to a decider. Both player kept their serve until the 4th game where Williams had to save 3 break points. The match went on serve until Williams broke in the 14th game and served it out. Williams also recorded 23 aces in the match, which was the most aces in a match by a female tennis player, breaking her own record of 20 aces which she set in her semifinal match against Elena Dementieva in Wimbledon 2009. Her next opponent was the first woman ever to score a 'Golden Set' in a Grand Slam event in the Open Era, Wild Card Yaroslava Shvedova of Kazakhstan. Williams dominated the first set, taking the first five games before Shvedova took a game, Williams eventually won the set. However, Shvedova came back in the second set, breaking the Williams serve twice to take the second. The third set came on serve until the tenth game, where Williams' broke and served out for the match on her first match point. In the quarterfinals, Williams faced defending champion Petra Kvitová. In the first set, Williams took the only break of the set at the sixth game and eventually took the set. The second set was tighter as Kvitová had set point at tenth game on the Williams serve; however, Williams saved it and broke in the next game to serve it out and advance to the semifinals. In the semifinals, she faced 2012 Australian Open champion Victoria Azarenka. Williams took care of the first set, winning it with a single break. In the second set, Williams broke early at the third game; however, the Belarusian broke back in the sixth game, as both players held serve to push the second set into a tie-break, which Williams won with her 24th ace in her second match point and first on her own serve. Williams broke her own record set in the third round of 23 aces. It was her fifth win in a row against Azarenka. Williams' opponent in the final was first-time Slam finalist Agnieszka Radwańska. Williams dominated the first set, winning it, winning the first five games and closing it out in the seventh game. Williams led by a break against the Polish no. 3 seed before a rain-delay. In the resumption of the match, Radwańska took advantage of a sloppy Williams, coming back and winning the set. In the final and deciding set, Williams took the final five games to take the match. It was Williams' fifth Wimbledon singles title, tying her with sister Venus; this is also her 14th Slam singles title and her first since 2010 Wimbledon. She also recorded 102 aces in the entire tournament, the most of any men and women. After the win she moved to number 4 in rankings. After she won the Wimbledon singles title, former world no. 1 John McEnroe described Williams as the greatest female player who has ever played the game.

Serena Williams also played doubles with sister Venus. The sisters were playing in their first doubles tournament since Wimbledon 2010. In the first round, they cruised past Vesna Dolonc and Olga Savchuk. In the second round they faced the Russian pairing and 4th seeds Nadia Petrova and Maria Kirilenko; the Williams sisters lost the first, but came back to take the second. The match was postponed once and was suspended twice; the match continued 3 days after the completion of the first two sets; the Russians took a 4–2 lead, but the American broke back and won the match. Later that same day, they played Bethanie Mattek-Sands and Sania Mirza and won. In their quarterfinal match, they faced compatriots Raquel Kops-Jones and Abigail Spears, dominating them by winning with a double breadstick. In the semifinals, they faced another American pairing, top seeds Liezel Huber and Lisa Raymond; after losing the first set, they came back and dominated the next two. In the final they faced the Czech pairing and 2011 French Open champions Andrea Hlaváčková and Lucie Hradecká and won, claiming their fifth Wimbledon doubles and 13th slam as a team.

==== London Olympics ====
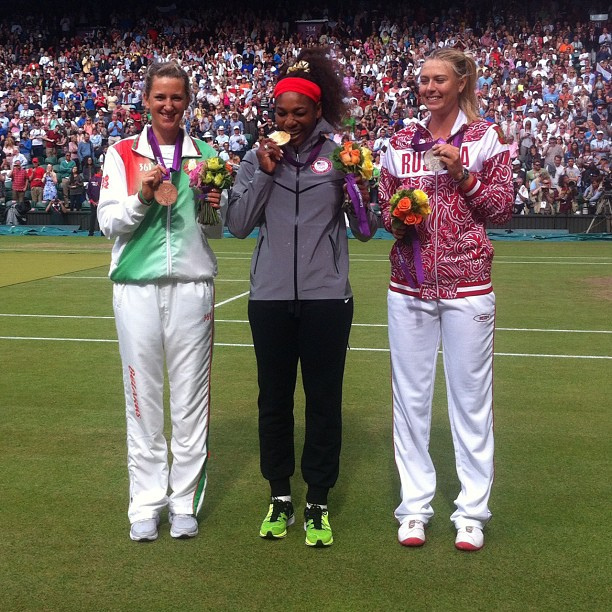
Williams won the singles medal after dominating the women's singles field at the Summer Olympics with the loss of just 17 games. She completed the Career Golden Slam in singles; making her the first player in history to achieve a Career Golden Slam in both singles and doubles.

Williams then came back to Wimbledon, one month after winning the title to represent the United States in the Olympics. In the first round she faced former number one Jelena Janković and won the match in just 61 minutes. She served 8 aces and did not face a single break point. She then competed against Poland's Urszula Radwańska in the second round. Williams won the first set with a break, and won the second set with a single break. Williams served 8 aces and had 26 winners in her one-hour-and-13-minute victory. Her third round match was a repeat of the 2010 Wimbledon Championships final, as she faced Vera Zvonareva. The American dominated the Russian as she won the first five games before the Russian won a game. Williams then won the last seven games to win the match in just 51 minutes. In the quarterfinals, she faced former number one Caroline Wozniacki of Denmark. Williams dominated the proceedings winning the first eight games before the Dane stopped her fifteen-game winning streak and won the ninth game of the match. However, Wozniacki could not break Williams' serve and the American closed out the match in 77 minutes. In the semifinals, she faced world number one Victoria Azarenka for the third time in 2012. Despite Azarenka's number one ranking, Williams dominated the match winning one and two and served 16 aces and did not face a single break point. In the final she faced Russian Maria Sharapova for the gold medal. Williams dominated the match taking the first nine games in just 45 minutes before her Russian opponent won a game. Williams then took the next three games to win for her 8th consecutive win against Sharapova. Williams served ten aces and two double faults to Sharapova's one and five. Williams also hit 24 winners to 7 unforced errors compared to Sharapova's six winners, and ten unforced errors. This win gave Serena a Career Golden Slam in Singles, only the second woman to do so.

Serena paired with sister Venus at the London Olympics in Women's Doubles, they are the defending champion from winning in the 2008 Beijing Olympics. In the first round, they defeated the Romanian pairing of Sorana Cîrstea and Simona Halep. They then won their next matches against German 5th seeds Angelique Kerber and Sabine Lisicki and the second seeds Italians Roberta Vinci and Sara Errani. In the medal rounds they faced the Russian pairing of Maria Kirilenko and Nadia Petrova who were the third seeds and won with a break lead in each set. In the final they defeated 4th seeds Andrea Hlaváčková and Lucie Hradecká of the Czech Republic at four in each set for the gold medal. This is the third gold medal in doubles for Serena and Venus making the sisters the only players to have won four gold medals in tennis. Venus won the Singles Gold Medal in 2000 in Sydney, Serena won the Singles Gold Medal in 2012 in London and they won the Doubles Gold Medals in 2000 in Sydney, 2008 in Beijing and 2012 in London. Serena has a Career Golden Slam in both singles and doubles and is the only player with that distinction.

=== US Open Series ===
==== Bank of the West Classic ====
Williams played Stanford directly after winning Wimbledon. Williams is coming in the tournament as the defending champion and top seed. She received a bye in the first round and faced American wild card Nicole Gibbs in the second round, despite looking sluggish due to jet-lag, the 14-time slam champion came through comfortably. In the quarterfinals she faced Chanelle Scheepers, the first set Williams' broke the South African's serve three times, while being broken twice herself and took the set. The second set was a lot easier, Williams took it without losing a game. She then faced Sorana Cîrstea, despite serving only 37% of first serves in, she routed the Romanian losing only 3 games. In the final she faced Lucky Loser Coco Vandeweghe, the first lucky loser to reach the final in 5 years. This also the first All-American final since the WTA Tour Championships in 2009. Williams took an early break lead in the first set but struggled serving on the sun and fell down with Vandeweghe serving for the set and had a set point but Williams came back to win the set in the twelfth game. Williams took an early break in the 4th game of the second set with a double fault from Vandeweghe and took the set and the title.

==== Western & Southern Open ====
After her Olympics victory, Williams then played at Cincinnati as her warm-up to the US Open. She received a bye into the second round, where she faced Greek player Eleni Daniilidou and won in straights despite making 44 unforced errors She then faced Urszula Radwańska in the round of 16 and took the first set after breaking late in the set. The second set saw Williams down a double break until she took the next 6 games to book her quarterfinal spot. In the quarterfinals she faced German Angelique Kerber, but lost at four in both sets after Kerber converted in her 3rd match point. This loss ended the American's third longest winning streak of 19 wins.

==== US Open ====
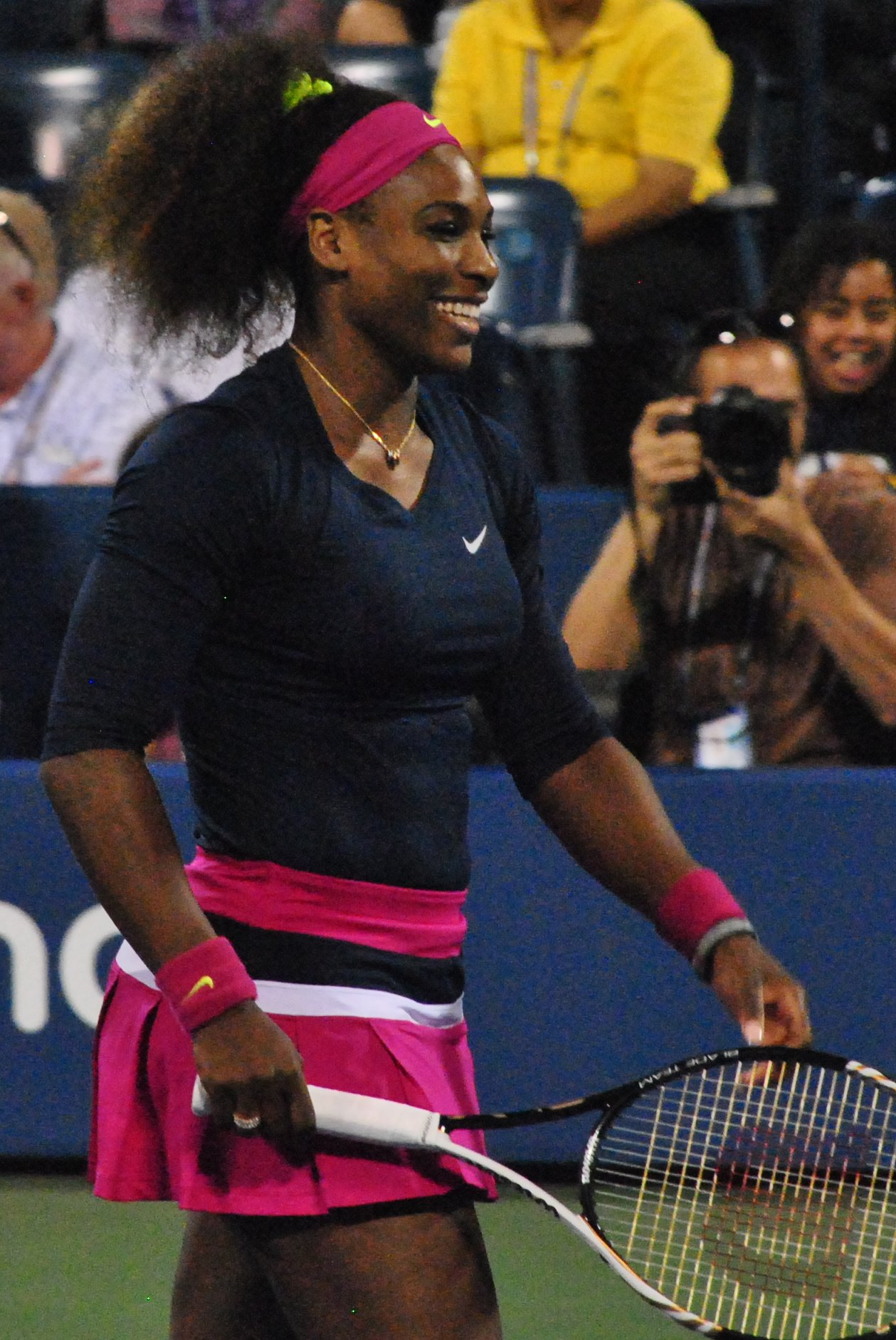
Williams won her 15th slam of her career at the US Open.

Williams came into the US Open trying to be the only third woman after Steffi Graf and sister Venus Williams to win Wimbledon-Olympics-US Open in the same year. She was the 4th seed in the event. In the first round she face compatriot Coco Vandeweghe and won in under an hour with Vandeweghe only managing to hold serve and break only once in the match. She then faced María José Martínez Sánchez in the next round, Williams won the first set quite comfortably, however in the second set she fell down by an early break until she came back and won the set. In the third round she faced the woman who beat her in the fourth round of the Australian Open this year Ekaterina Makarova, the first set was toe-to-toe and was on serve until Williams broke in the tenth game of the first set to take it, the American then won the second set in a bagel. In the next round Williams faced Andrea Hlaváčková, and won without dropping a game, earning her first double bagel in the US Open. Williams hit 31 winners to only 7 unforced errors. In the quarterfinals, she faced former number 1 Ana Ivanovic, where Williams saw her 23-game winning streak ended when Ivanovic won the 4th game of the first set. However, Williams cruised passed the Serbian winning the match in just 58 minutes. In the semifinals, the 2012 French Open finalist Sara Errani was awaiting. Errani didn't take a game until the sixth game of the match, with Williams closing it out the set in the next game. In the second set, the American broke the Italian twice to serve it out and advance to the Final. Williams didn't face a single break point in the match. In her sixth final, she faced world no. 1 and first time US Open finalist Victoria Azarenka. Williams lead their head-to-head 9–1. The first set saw the Serena Williams of the tournament and won the set with a double break by breaking the Azarenka serve. However, in the second set Azarenka broke in the very first game and took advantage winning the set. They then headed to the first 3-set women's final since 1995. Azarenka then took an early break advantage just to see Williams break right back. Azarenka however broke in the 7th game of the second set and held to serve for the title in the tenth game, but just to get broken. Azarenka then was serving to stay in the match at the twelfth game and was up 40–30 but got broken to hand the title to Williams. This is Williams' 4th US Open and 15th Slam.

Serena Williams also played doubles with sister Venus. In the first two-round they faced the team of Lindsay Lee-Waters and Megan Moulton-Levy, and the team of 15th seeds Klaudia Jans-Ignacik and Kristina Mladenovic. They won against the two teams in the same scoreline. In the third round they faced 4th seeds Maria Kirilenko and Nadia Petrova for the third time in the year. The Russian team gave the upset of the Women's doubles defeating the Williams Sisters.

=== WTA Tour Championships ===
Williams' came into the WTA Championships with no warm-up events having withdrawn from the Asian Swing. Williams ended in the red group with Victoria Azarenka, Angelique Kerber and Li Na. She played the first match of the tournament facing Kerber, to whom she lost their last encounter. Williams took the first three-game then lead but was pegged back by the German by taking the next 3 games. Williams then broke Kerber to take the set. Williams then took the last 5 games of the match to take the second set and the match. Williams made 26 winners and 20 unforced errors in the match. Her next opponent was China's Li. The match began with Williams breaking Li's serve. However Li was quick to strike back reeling off four games only to see Williams comeback to take four straight games herself. In the next four games the two traded breaks to send the set into a tie-breaker. Williams won it with ease. The second began by Li breaking Williams only to see Williams again reel off four games. The rest of the set went on serve until Williams closed out the match. Williams ended with 22 winners and 31 unforced errors in the match. In her final round robin match it was a rematch of the 2012 US Open finals against Azarenka. The match began with seven straight holds of serve until Williams broke in the ninth game just to broken back but Williams broke again when Azarenka double-fauled to give away the set. Azarenka began the second by reeling of three straight games. However she was unable to hold on as Williams won four straight games herself. Williams broke Azarenka in the tenth game to take the match with a double-fault. Williams have now improved her record against Azarenka to 11–1 and advancing into semifinals as the Red Group's top player with a 3–0 match win record and without the loss of a set. In the semifinals Williams' faced world no. 4 Agnieszka Radwańska. Williams reeled off an eight-game winning streak from the 4th game in the first set. Williams won the match and was accompanied by 39 winners. In the final, Williams faced Maria Sharapova in a rematch of the 2004 WTA Tour Championships. The first set was close with Williams winning the set 6–4. Williams started the first set by breaking the Sharapova serve and then broke Sharapova again to win the match. Williams didn't face a single break points and made 40 winners – 14 unforced errors to Sharapova's 13 – 12 Williams also made 11 aces in the match. This is Williams' third Year-End title and is the oldest woman to hold win the title. This win also meant that she has won the most titles in the season with 7.

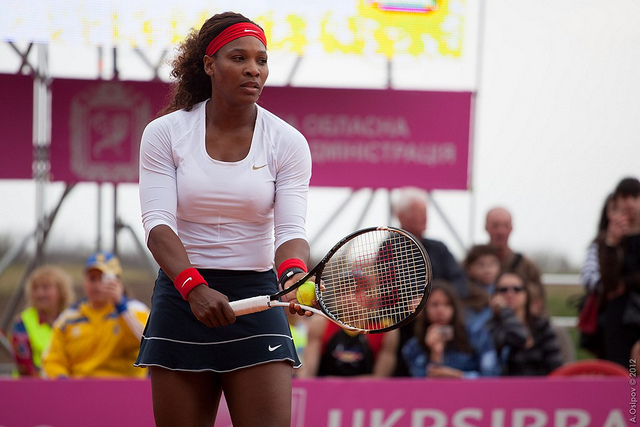
Williams playing for the first time a Fed Cup tie outside US since 1999.

=== Fed Cup ===
Williams' represented her team for their World Group II match against Belarus. This is the first time that Serena is playing Fed Cup since 2007. In her first rubber she faced Olga Govortsova and won in two sets. In her second rubber she faced Anastasia Yakimova, she struggled in the first set, however Williams' came back winning the last two sets easily. This win secured the United States Fed Cup team a spot in the 2012 Fed Cup World Group play-offs. She then represented the US Fed Cup Team at the World Group play-offs against Ukraine. This is the first time since 1999 that she represented Fed Cup outside of the United States. In both her rubbers she defeated Elina Svitolina and Lesia Tsurenko. With her teammates Christina McHale winning both her ties, and Liezel Huber and Sloane Stephens winning the doubles, the US Fed Cup team swept Ukraine 5–0 to advance to the 2013 Fed Cup World Group.

== All matches ==
=== Singles matches ===
Tournament	Match	Round	Opponent	Rank	Result	Score
Brisbane International; Brisbane, Australia; WTA Premier; Hard, outdoor 1–9 January 2012	601	1R	(South Africa) Chanelle Scheepers	#38	Win	6–2, 6–3
Brisbane International; Brisbane, Australia; WTA Premier; Hard, outdoor 1–9 January 2012	602	2R	(Serbia) Bojana Jovanovski	#76	Win	6–2, 6–4
Brisbane International; Brisbane, Australia; WTA Premier; Hard, outdoor 1–9 January 2012	–	QF	(Slovakia) Daniela Hantuchová	#24	Withdrew	N/A
Australian Open; Melbourne, Australia; Grand Slam; Hard, outdoor 16–29 January 2012	603	1R	(Austria) Tamira Paszek	#45	Win	6–3, 6–2
Australian Open; Melbourne, Australia; Grand Slam; Hard, outdoor 16–29 January 2012	604	2R	(Czech Republic) Barbora Záhlavová-Strýcová	#49	Win	6–0, 6–4
Australian Open; Melbourne, Australia; Grand Slam; Hard, outdoor 16–29 January 2012	605	3R	(Hungary) Gréta Arn	#92	Win	6–1, 6–1
Australian Open; Melbourne, Australia; Grand Slam; Hard, outdoor 16–29 January 2012	606	4R	(Russia) Ekaterina Makarova	#56	Loss	2–6, 3–6
Fed Cup WG II: United States vs. Belarus; Massachusetts, United States; Fed Cup; Hard, indoor February 4–5, 2012	607	–	(Belarus) Olga Govortsova	#97	Win	7–5, 6–0
Fed Cup WG II: United States vs. Belarus; Massachusetts, United States; Fed Cup; Hard, indoor February 4–5, 2012	608	–	(Belarus) Anastasiya Yakimova	#65	Win	5–7, 6–1, 6–1
Sony Ericsson Open; Miami, United States; WTA Premier Mandatory; Hard, outdoor 19 March–1 April 2012	–	1R	Bye			
Sony Ericsson Open; Miami, United States; WTA Premier Mandatory; Hard, outdoor 19 March–1 April 2012	609	2R	(China) Zhang Shuai	#171	Win	6–2, 6–3
Sony Ericsson Open; Miami, United States; WTA Premier Mandatory; Hard, outdoor 19 March–1 April 2012	610	3R	(Italy) Roberta Vinci	#21	Win	6–2, 6–1
Sony Ericsson Open; Miami, United States; WTA Premier Mandatory; Hard, outdoor 19 March–1 April 2012	611	4R	(Australia) Samantha Stosur	#5	Win	7–5, 6–3
Sony Ericsson Open; Miami, United States; WTA Premier Mandatory; Hard, outdoor 19 March–1 April 2012	612	QF	(Denmark) Caroline Wozniacki	#6	Loss	4–6, 4–6
Family Circle Cup; Charleston, United States; WTA Premier; Clay (green), outdoor 2–8 April 2012	–	1R	Bye			
Family Circle Cup; Charleston, United States; WTA Premier; Clay (green), outdoor 2–8 April 2012	613	2R	(Russia) Elena Vesnina	#56	Win	6–3, 6–4
Family Circle Cup; Charleston, United States; WTA Premier; Clay (green), outdoor 2–8 April 2012	614	3R	(New Zealand) Marina Erakovic	#45	Win	6–2, 6–2
Family Circle Cup; Charleston, United States; WTA Premier; Clay (green), outdoor 2–8 April 2012	615	QF	(Germany) Sabine Lisicki	#13	Win	4–1, Ret.
Family Circle Cup; Charleston, United States; WTA Premier; Clay (green), outdoor 2–8 April 2012	616	SF	(Australia) Samantha Stosur	#5	Win	6–1, 6–1
Family Circle Cup; Charleston, United States; WTA Premier; Clay (green), outdoor 2–8 April 2012	617	F	(Czech Republic) Lucie Šafářová	#26	Win	6–0, 6–1
Fed Cup play-offs: Ukraine vs. United States; Kharkiv, Ukraine; Fed Cup; Clay, outdoor April 21–22, 2012	618	–	(Ukraine) Lesia Tsurenko	#110	Win	6–3, 6–2
Fed Cup play-offs: Ukraine vs. United States; Kharkiv, Ukraine; Fed Cup; Clay, outdoor April 21–22, 2012	619	–	(Ukraine) Elina Svitolina	#171	Win	6–2, 6–1
Mutua Madrid Open; Madrid, Spain; WTA Premier Mandatory; Clay, outdoor 7–13 May 2012	620	1R	(Russia) Elena Vesnina	#68	Win	6–3, 6–1
Mutua Madrid Open; Madrid, Spain; WTA Premier Mandatory; Clay, outdoor 7–13 May 2012	621	2R	(Russia) Anastasia Pavlyuchenkova	#24	Win	6–2, 6–1
Mutua Madrid Open; Madrid, Spain; WTA Premier Mandatory; Clay, outdoor 7–13 May 2012	622	3R	(Denmark) Caroline Wozniacki	#6	Win	1–6, 6–3, 6–2
Mutua Madrid Open; Madrid, Spain; WTA Premier Mandatory; Clay, outdoor 7–13 May 2012	623	QF	(Russia) Maria Sharapova	#2	Win	6–1, 6–3
Mutua Madrid Open; Madrid, Spain; WTA Premier Mandatory; Clay, outdoor 7–13 May 2012	624	SF	(Czech Republic) Lucie Hradecká	#105	Win	7–6^{(7–5)}, 6–0
Mutua Madrid Open; Madrid, Spain; WTA Premier Mandatory; Clay, outdoor 7–13 May 2012	625	F	(Belarus) Victoria Azarenka	#1	Win	6–1, 6–3
Internazionali BNL d'Italia; Rome, Italy; WTA Premier 5 Clay, outdoor 14–20 May 2012	626	1R	(Kazakhstan) Galina Voskoboeva	#46	Win	6–2, 6–3
Internazionali BNL d'Italia; Rome, Italy; WTA Premier 5 Clay, outdoor 14–20 May 2012	627	2R	(Russia) Nadia Petrova	#30	Win	4–6, 6–2, 6–3
Internazionali BNL d'Italia; Rome, Italy; WTA Premier 5 Clay, outdoor 14–20 May 2012	628	3R	(Spain) Anabel Medina Garrigues	#31	Win	6–3, 6–1
Internazionali BNL d'Italia; Rome, Italy; WTA Premier 5 Clay, outdoor 14–20 May 2012	629	QF	(Italy) Flavia Pennetta	#21	Win	4–0, Ret
Internazionali BNL d'Italia; Rome, Italy; WTA Premier 5 Clay, outdoor 14–20 May 2012	–	SF	(China) Li Na	#9	Withdrew	N/A
French Open; Paris, France; Grand Slam; Clay, outdoor 28 May – 10 June 2012	630	1R	(France) Virginie Razzano	#111	Loss	6–4, 6–7^{(5–7)}, 3–6
Wimbledon Championships; London, United Kingdom; Grand Slam; Grass, outdoor 25 June – 8 July 2012	631	1R	(Czech Republic) Barbora Záhlavová-Strýcová	#62	Win	6–2, 6–4
Wimbledon Championships; London, United Kingdom; Grand Slam; Grass, outdoor 25 June – 8 July 2012	632	2R	(Hungary) Melinda Czink	#98	Win	6–1, 6–4
Wimbledon Championships; London, United Kingdom; Grand Slam; Grass, outdoor 25 June – 8 July 2012	633	3R	(China) Zheng Jie	#27	Win	6–7^{(5–7)}, 6–2, 9–7
Wimbledon Championships; London, United Kingdom; Grand Slam; Grass, outdoor 25 June – 8 July 2012	634	4R	(Kazakhstan) Yaroslava Shvedova	#65	Win	6–1, 2–6, 7–5
Wimbledon Championships; London, United Kingdom; Grand Slam; Grass, outdoor 25 June – 8 July 2012	635	QF	(Czech Republic) Petra Kvitová	#4	Win	6–3, 7–5
Wimbledon Championships; London, United Kingdom; Grand Slam; Grass, outdoor 25 June – 8 July 2012	636	SF	(Belarus) Victoria Azarenka	#2	Win	6–3, 7–6^{(8–6)}
Wimbledon Championships; London, United Kingdom; Grand Slam; Grass, outdoor 25 June – 8 July 2012	637	F	(Poland) Agnieszka Radwańska	#3	Win	6–1, 5–7, 6–2
Bank of the West Classic; Stanford, United States; WTA Premier; Hard, outdoor 9–15 July 2012	–	1R	Bye			
Bank of the West Classic; Stanford, United States; WTA Premier; Hard, outdoor 9–15 July 2012	638	2R	(United States) Nicole Gibbs	#403	Win	6–2, 6–1
Bank of the West Classic; Stanford, United States; WTA Premier; Hard, outdoor 9–15 July 2012	639	QF	(South Africa) Chanelle Scheepers	#42	Win	6–4, 6–0
Bank of the West Classic; Stanford, United States; WTA Premier; Hard, outdoor 9–15 July 2012	640	SF	(Romania) Sorana Cîrstea	#43	Win	6–1, 6–2
Bank of the West Classic; Stanford, United States; WTA Premier; Hard, outdoor 9–15 July 2012	641	F	(United States) Coco Vandeweghe	#120	Win	7–5, 6–3
2012 Summer Olympics; London, United Kingdom; Olympic Games; Grass, outdoor 27 July–5 August 2012	642	1R	(Serbia) Jelena Janković	#18	Win	6–3, 6–1
2012 Summer Olympics; London, United Kingdom; Olympic Games; Grass, outdoor 27 July–5 August 2012	643	2R	(Poland) Urszula Radwańska	#45	Win	6–2, 6–3
2012 Summer Olympics; London, United Kingdom; Olympic Games; Grass, outdoor 27 July–5 August 2012	644	3R	(Russia) Vera Zvonareva	#13	Win	6–1, 6–0
2012 Summer Olympics; London, United Kingdom; Olympic Games; Grass, outdoor 27 July–5 August 2012	645	QF	(Denmark) Caroline Wozniacki	#8	Win	6–0, 6–3
2012 Summer Olympics; London, United Kingdom; Olympic Games; Grass, outdoor 27 July–5 August 2012	646	SF	(Belarus) Victoria Azarenka	#1	Win	6–1, 6–2
2012 Summer Olympics; London, United Kingdom; Olympic Games; Grass, outdoor 27 July–5 August 2012	647	G	(Russia) Maria Sharapova	#3	Win	6–0, 6–1
Western & Southern Open; Cincinnati, United States; WTA Premier 5 Hard, outdoor 13–19 August 2012	–	1R	Bye			
Western & Southern Open; Cincinnati, United States; WTA Premier 5 Hard, outdoor 13–19 August 2012	648	2R	(Greece) Eleni Daniilidou	#121	Win	6–3, 6–4
Western & Southern Open; Cincinnati, United States; WTA Premier 5 Hard, outdoor 13–19 August 2012	649	3R	(Poland) Urszula Radwańska	#46	Win	6–4, 6–3
Western & Southern Open; Cincinnati, United States; WTA Premier 5 Hard, outdoor 13–19 August 2012	650	QF	(Germany) Angelique Kerber	#7	Loss	4–6, 4–6
US Open; New York City, United States; Grand Slam; Hard, outdoor 27 August – 9 September 2012	651	1R	(United States) Coco Vandeweghe	#75	Win	6–1, 6–1
US Open; New York City, United States; Grand Slam; Hard, outdoor 27 August – 9 September 2012	652	2R	(Spain) María José Martínez Sánchez	#108	Win	6–2, 6–4
US Open; New York City, United States; Grand Slam; Hard, outdoor 27 August – 9 September 2012	653	3R	(Russia) Ekaterina Makarova	#42	Win	6–4, 6–0
US Open; New York City, United States; Grand Slam; Hard, outdoor 27 August – 9 September 2012	654	4R	(Czech Republic) Andrea Hlaváčková	#82	Win	6–0, 6–0
US Open; New York City, United States; Grand Slam; Hard, outdoor 27 August – 9 September 2012	655	QF	(Serbia) Ana Ivanovic	#13	Win	6–1, 6–3
US Open; New York City, United States; Grand Slam; Hard, outdoor 27 August – 9 September 2012	656	SF	(Italy) Sara Errani	#10	Win	6–1, 6–2
US Open; New York City, United States; Grand Slam; Hard, outdoor 27 August – 9 September 2012	657	F	(Belarus) Victoria Azarenka	#1	Win	6–2, 2–6, 7–5
WTA Tour Championships; Istanbul, Turkey; Year-End Championship; Hard, indoor 23 – 28 October 2012	658	RR	(Germany) Angelique Kerber	#5	Win	6–4, 6–1
WTA Tour Championships; Istanbul, Turkey; Year-End Championship; Hard, indoor 23 – 28 October 2012	659	RR	(China) Li Na	#8	Win	7–6^{(7–2)}, 6–3
WTA Tour Championships; Istanbul, Turkey; Year-End Championship; Hard, indoor 23 – 28 October 2012	660	RR	(Belarus) Victoria Azarenka	#1	Win	6–4, 6–4
WTA Tour Championships; Istanbul, Turkey; Year-End Championship; Hard, indoor 23 – 28 October 2012	661	SF	(Poland) Agnieszka Radwańska	#4	Win	6–2, 6–1
WTA Tour Championships; Istanbul, Turkey; Year-End Championship; Hard, indoor 23 – 28 October 2012	662	F	(Russia) Maria Sharapova	#2	Win	6–4, 6–3

=== Doubles matches ===
Tournament	Match	Round	Partner	Opponents	Rank	Result	Score
Wimbledon Championships; London, United Kingdom; Grand Slam; Grass, outdoor 25 June – 8 July 2012	174	1R	(United States) Venus Williams	(Serbia) Vesna Dolonc (Ukraine) Olga Savchuk	#119 #92	Win	6–0, 6–3
Wimbledon Championships; London, United Kingdom; Grand Slam; Grass, outdoor 25 June – 8 July 2012	175	2R	(United States) Venus Williams	(Russia) Maria Kirilenko (Russia) Nadia Petrova	#7 #10	Win	3–6, 6–3, 9–7
Wimbledon Championships; London, United Kingdom; Grand Slam; Grass, outdoor 25 June – 8 July 2012	176	3R	(United States) Venus Williams	(United States) Bethanie Mattek-Sands (India) Sania Mirza	#53 #12	Win	6–4, 6–3
Wimbledon Championships; London, United Kingdom; Grand Slam; Grass, outdoor 25 June – 8 July 2012	177	QF	(United States) Venus Williams	(United States) Raquel Kops-Jones (United States) Abigail Spears	#24 #25	Win	6–1, 6–1
Wimbledon Championships; London, United Kingdom; Grand Slam; Grass, outdoor 25 June – 8 July 2012	178	SF	(United States) Venus Williams	(United States) Liezel Huber (United States) Lisa Raymond	#1 #1	Win	2–6, 6–1, 6–2
Wimbledon Championships; London, United Kingdom; Grand Slam; Grass, outdoor 25 June – 8 July 2012	179	F	(United States) Venus Williams	(Czech Republic) Andrea Hlaváčková (Czech Republic) Lucie Hradecká	#17 #13	Win	7–5, 6–4
2012 Summer Olympics; London, United Kingdom; Olympic Games; Grass, outdoor 27 July–5 August 2012	180	1R	(United States) Venus Williams	(Romania) Sorana Cîrstea (Romania) Simona Halep	#115 #163	Win	6–3, 6–2
2012 Summer Olympics; London, United Kingdom; Olympic Games; Grass, outdoor 27 July–5 August 2012	181	2R	(United States) Venus Williams	(Germany) Angelique Kerber (Germany) Sabine Lisicki	#213 #131	Win	6–2, 7–5
2012 Summer Olympics; London, United Kingdom; Olympic Games; Grass, outdoor 27 July–5 August 2012	182	QF	(United States) Venus Williams	(Italy) Sara Errani (Italy) Roberta Vinci	#3 #4	Win	6–1, 6–1
2012 Summer Olympics; London, United Kingdom; Olympic Games; Grass, outdoor 27 July–5 August 2012	183	SF	(United States) Venus Williams	(Russia) Maria Kirilenko (Russia) Nadia Petrova	#7 #9	Win	7–5, 6–4
2012 Summer Olympics; London, United Kingdom; Olympic Games; Grass, outdoor 27 July–5 August 2012	184	G	(United States) Venus Williams	(Czech Republic) Andrea Hlaváčková (Czech Republic) Lucie Hradecká	#12 #8	Win	6–4, 6–4
US Open; New York City, United States; Grand Slam; Hard, outdoor 27 August – 9 September 2012	185	1R	(United States) Venus Williams	(United States) Lindsay Lee-Waters (United States) Megan Moulton-Levy	#88 #87	Win	6–4, 6–0
US Open; New York City, United States; Grand Slam; Hard, outdoor 27 August – 9 September 2012	186	2R	(United States) Venus Williams	(Poland) Klaudia Jans-Ignacik (France) Kristina Mladenovic	#29 #37	Win	6–4, 6–0
US Open; New York City, United States; Grand Slam; Hard, outdoor 27 August – 9 September 2012	187	3R	(United States) Venus Williams	(Russia) Maria Kirilenko (Russia) Nadia Petrova	#11 #7	Loss	1–6, 4–6

=== Mixed doubles matches ===
Tournament	Match	Round	Partner	Opponents	Rank	Result	Score
French Open; Paris, France; Grand Slam; Clay, outdoor 28 May – 10 June 2012	24	1R	(United States) Bob Bryan	(Argentina) Gisela Dulko (Argentina) Eduardo Schwank	#14 #25	Loss	5–7, 6–3, [6–10]

== Tournament schedule ==
=== Singles schedule ===
Williams' 2012 singles tournament schedule is as follows:

Date	Championship	Location	Category	Surface	Points	Outcome
2 January 2012– 7 January 2012	Brisbane International	Brisbane (AUS)	WTA Premier	Hard	120	Quarterfinals; Withdrew before against Daniela Hantuchová
16 January 2012– 29 January 2012	Australian Open	Melbourne (AUS)	Grand Slam	Hard	280	Fourth Round lost to Ekaterina Makarova, 2–6, 3–6
4 February 2012– 5 February 2012	Fed Cup WG II: United States vs. Belarus	Massachusetts (USA)	Fed Cup	Hard (i)		United States def. Belarus, 5–0; United States Advanced to 2012 WG Play-offs
19 March 2012– 1 April 2012	Sony Ericsson Open	Miami (USA)	WTA Premier Mandatory	Hard	250	Quarterfinals lost to Caroline Wozniacki, 4–6, 4–6
2 April 2012– 8 April 2012	Family Circle Cup	Charleston (USA)	WTA Premier	Clay (green)	470	Winner defeated Lucie Šafářová, 6–0, 6–1
21 April 2012– 22 April 2012	Fed Cup World Group play-offs: Ukraine vs. United States	Kharkiv (UKR)	Fed Cup	Clay (red)		United States def. Ukraine, 5–0; United States Advanced to 2013 Fed Cup WG
7 May 2012– 13 May 2012	Mutua Madrid Open	Madrid (ESP)	WTA Premier Mandatory	Clay (blue)	1000	Winner defeated Victoria Azarenka, 6–1, 6–3
14 May 2012– 20 May 2012	Internazionali BNL d'Italia	Rome (ITA)	WTA Premier 5	Clay (red)	395	Semifinals; Withdrew before match against Li Na
28 May 2012– 10 June 2012	French Open	Paris (FRA)	Grand Slam	Clay (red)	5	First Round lost to Virginie Razzano, 6–4, 6–7^{(5–7)}, 3–6
25 June 2012– 8 July 2012	The Championships, Wimbledon	Wimbledon (GBR)	Grand Slam	Grass	2000	Winner defeated Agnieszka Radwańska, 6–1, 5–7, 6–2
9 July 2012– 15 July 2012	Bank of the West Classic	Stanford (USA)	WTA Premier	Hard	470	Winner defeated Coco Vandeweghe, 7–5, 6–3
27 July 2012– 5 August 2012	2012 Summer Olympics	London (GBR)	Olympic Games	Grass	685	Gold Medal defeated Maria Sharapova, 6–0, 6–1
13 August 2012– 19 August 2012	Western & Southern Open	Cincinnati (USA)	WTA Premier 5	Hard	225	Quarterfinals lost to Angelique Kerber, 4–6, 4–6
27 August 2012– 9 September 2012	US Open	New York (USA)	Grand Slam	Hard	2000	Winner defeated Victoria Azarenka, 6–2, 2–6, 7–5
1 October 2012– 7 October 2012	China Open	Beijing (CHN)	WTA Premier Mandatory	Hard	0	Withdrew
23 October 2012– 28 October 2012	WTA Tour Championships	Istanbul (TUR)	Year-End Championships	Hard (i)	1500	Winner defeated Maria Sharapova, 6–4, 6–3
Total year-end points					9400	

=== Doubles schedule ===
Williams' 2012 doubles tournament schedule is as follows:

Date	Championship	Location	Category	Partner	Surface	Points	Outcome
25 June 2012– 8 July 2012	The Championships, Wimbledon	Wimbledon (GBR)	Grand Slam	(United States) Venus Williams	Grass	2000	Winner defeated Hlaváčková/Hradecká, 7–5, 6–4
27 July 2012– 5 August 2012	2012 Summer Olympics	London (GBR)	Olympic Games	(United States) Venus Williams	Grass	–	Gold Medal defeated Hlaváčková/Hradecká, 6–4, 6–4
27 August 2012– 9 September 2012	US Open	New York (USA)	Grand Slam	(United States) Venus Williams	Hard	280	Third Round lost to Kirilenko/Petrova, 1–6, 4–6
Total year-end points						2280	

=== Mixed doubles schedule ===
Williams' 2012 mixed doubles tournament schedule is as follows:

Date	Championship	Location	Category	Partner	Surface	Outcome
28 May 2012– 10 June 2012	French Open	Paris (FRA)	Grand Slam	(United States) Bob Bryan	Clay (red)	First Round lost to Dulko/Schwank, 5–7, 6–3, [6–10]

== Yearly records ==
=== Head-to-head matchups ===
Ordered by percentage of wins, as of WTA Tour Championships

- (Belarus) Victoria Azarenka 5–0
- (Russia) Maria Sharapova 3–0
- (Australia) Samantha Stosur 2–0
- (Russia) Elena Vesnina 2–0
- (Czech Republic) Barbora Záhlavová-Strýcová 2–0
- (South Africa) Chanelle Scheepers 2–0
- (Poland) Agnieszka Radwańska 2–0
- (Poland) Urszula Radwańska 2–0
- (United States) Coco Vandeweghe 2–0
- (Denmark) Caroline Wozniacki 2–1
- (Serbia) Bojana Jovanovski 1–0
- (Austria) Tamira Paszek 1–0
- (Hungary) Gréta Arn 1–0
- (Belarus) Anastasia Yakimova 1–0
- (Spain) Anabel Medina Garrigues 1–0
- (Italy) Flavia Pennetta 1–0
- (Italy) Roberta Vinci 1–0
- (New Zealand) Marina Erakovic 1–0
- (Germany) Sabine Lisicki 1–0
- (Czech Republic) Lucie Šafářová 1–0
- (Ukraine) Lesya Tsurenko 1–0
- (Ukraine) Elina Svitolina 1–0
- (Russia) Nadia Petrova 1–0
- (Belarus) Olga Govortsova 1–0
- (China) Zhang Shuai 1–0
- (Russia) Anastasia Pavlyuchenkova 1–0
- (Czech Republic) Lucie Hradecká 1–0
- (Kazakhstan) Galina Voskoboeva 1–0
- (Hungary) Melinda Czink 1–0
- (China) Zheng Jie 1–0
- (Kazakhstan) Yaroslava Shvedova 1–0
- (Czech Republic) Petra Kvitová 1–0
- (United States) Nicole Gibbs 1–0
- (Romania) Sorana Cîrstea 1–0
- (Serbia) Jelena Janković 1–0
- (Russia) Vera Zvonareva 1–0
- (Greece) Eleni Daniilidou 1–0
- (Serbia) Ana Ivanovic 1–0
- (Czech Republic) Andrea Hlaváčková 1–0
- (Spain) María José Martínez Sánchez 1–0
- (Italy) Sara Errani 1–0
- (China) Li Na 1–0
- (Russia) Ekaterina Makarova 1–1
- (Germany) Angelique Kerber 1–1
- (France) Virginie Razzano 0–1

=== Finals ===
==== Singles: 7 (7–0) ====
Legend
Grand Slam tournaments (2–0)
WTA Tour Championships (1–0)
Olympics Gold (1–0)
WTA Premier Mandatory (1–0)
WTA Premier (2–0)

Finals by surface
Hard (3–0)
Clay (2–0)
Grass (2–0)

Finals by venue
Outdoors (6–0)
Indoors (1–0)

Outcome	No.	Date	Championship	Surface	Opponent in the final	Score in the final
Winner	40.	April 8, 2012	Charleston, United States (2)	Clay (green)	(Czech Republic) Lucie Šafářová	6–0, 6–1
Winner	41.	May 13, 2012	Madrid, Spain (1)	Clay (blue)	(Belarus) Victoria Azarenka	6–1, 6–3
Winner	42.	July 7, 2012	Wimbledon, London, U.K. (5)	Grass	(Poland) Agnieszka Radwańska	6–1, 5–7, 6–2
Winner	43.	July 15, 2012	Stanford, United States (2)	Hard	(United States) Coco Vandeweghe	7–5, 6–3
Winner	44.	August 5, 2012	Summer Olympics (1)	Grass	(Russia) Maria Sharapova	6–0, 6–1
Winner	45.	September 9, 2012	US Open, New York, United States (4)	Hard	(Belarus) Victoria Azarenka	6–2, 2–6, 7–5
Winner	46.	October 8, 2012	Istanbul, Turkey (3)	Hard (i)	(Russia) Maria Sharapova	6–4, 6–3

==== Doubles: 2 (2–0) ====
Legend
Grand Slam tournaments (1–0)
Olympics Gold (1–0)

Finals by surface
Grass (2–0)

Finals by venue
Outdoors (2–0)

Outcome	No.	Date	Championship	Surface	Partner	Opponent in the final	Score in the final
Winner	21.	July 7, 2012	Wimbledon, London, U.K. (5)	Grass	(United States) Venus Williams	(Czech Republic) Andrea Hlaváčková (Czech Republic) Lucie Hradecká	7–5, 6–4
Winner	22.	August 5, 2012	Summer Olympics (3)	Grass	(United States) Venus Williams	(Czech Republic) Andrea Hlaváčková (Czech Republic) Lucie Hradecká	6–4, 6–4

=== Earnings ===
#	Event	Prize money	Year-to-date
1	Brisbane International	$16,000	$16,000
2	Australian Open	A$109,250	$131,423
3	Sony Ericsson Open	$79,000	$210,423
4	Family Circle Cup	$115,000	$325,423
5	Mutua Madrid Open	€631,000	$1,197,465
6	Internazionali BNL d'Italia	$70,175	$1,267,640
7	French Open	€18,000	$1,291,960
7	French Open (mixed doubles)	€1,750	$1,294,379
8	Wimbledon Championships	£1,150,000	$3,081,446
8	Wimbledon Championships (doubles)	£130,000	$3,283,458
9	Bank of the West Classic	$96,000	$3,379,458
10	2012 Summer Olympics	$0	$3,379,458
10	2012 Summer Olympics (doubles)	$0	$3,379,458
11	Western & Southern Open	$45,750	$3,425,208
12	US Open	$1,858,054	$5,283,262
12	US Open (doubles)	$12,713	$5,295,975
13	WTA Championships	$1,750,000	$7,045,975
			$7,045,975

Figures in United States dollars (USD) unless noted.

== See also ==
- 2012 WTA Tour

Sporting positions
Preceded by Venus Williams; Angelique Kerber	World No. 1 First stint: July 8, 2002 – August 10, 2003; Last stint: April 24, 2017 – May 14, 2017	Succeeded by Kim Clijsters; Angelique Kerber
Preceded by Jennifer Capriati; Justine Henin; Petra Kvitová	Year-end World No. 1; 2002; 2008, 2009; 2012 – 2015	Succeeded by Justine Henin; Kim Clijsters; Angelique Kerber
Awards
Preceded by Jennifer Capriati; Jelena Janković; Petra Kvitová	ITF Women's Singles World Champion; 2002; 2009; 2012 – 2015	Succeeded by Justine Henin; Caroline Wozniacki; Angelique Kerber
Preceded by Martina Hingis & Anna Kournikova; Cara Black & Liezel Huber	WTA Doubles Team of the Year; 2000 (with Venus Williams); 2009 (with Venus Williams)	Succeeded by Lisa Raymond & Rennae Stubbs; Gisela Dulko & Flavia Pennetta
Preceded by Cara Black & Liezel Huber	ITF Women's Doubles World Champion; 2009 (with Venus Williams)	Succeeded by Gisela Dulko & Flavia Pennetta
