= 2012 Maria Sharapova tennis season =

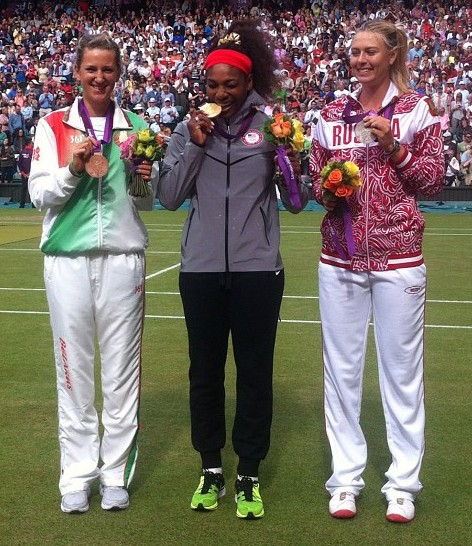
- Sharapova at the 2012 London Olympics
- Calendar prize money: $6,508,296

Singles
- Season record: 60–11 (84.51%)
- Year-end ranking: No. 2
- Ranking change from previous year: ▲2

Grand Slam & significant results
- Australian Open: F
- French Open: W
- Wimbledon: 4R
- US Open: SF
- Tour Finals: F
- Olympic Games: S

Fed Cup
- Fed Cup: SF
- Last updated on: 12 August 2014.

The 2012 Maria Sharapova tennis season officially began on 16 January 2012 with the start of the 2012 Australian Open. Sharapova began the season ranked the number 4 player in the world.

== All matches ==
Tournament	Match	Round	Opponent	Rank	Result	Score
Australian Open; Melbourne, Australia; Grand Slam; Hard, outdoor 16–29 January 2012	1	1R	(Argentina) Gisela Dulko	#68	Win	6–0, 6–1
Australian Open; Melbourne, Australia; Grand Slam; Hard, outdoor 16–29 January 2012	2	2R	(United States) Jamie Hampton	#144	Win	6–0, 6–1
Australian Open; Melbourne, Australia; Grand Slam; Hard, outdoor 16–29 January 2012	3	3R	(Germany) Angelique Kerber	#30	Win	6–1, 6–2
Australian Open; Melbourne, Australia; Grand Slam; Hard, outdoor 16–29 January 2012	4	4R	(Germany) Sabine Lisicki	#15	Win	3–6, 6–2, 6–3
Australian Open; Melbourne, Australia; Grand Slam; Hard, outdoor 16–29 January 2012	5	QF	(Russia) Ekaterina Makarova	#56	Win	6–2, 6–3
Australian Open; Melbourne, Australia; Grand Slam; Hard, outdoor 16–29 January 2012	6	SF	(Czech Republic) Petra Kvitová	#2	Win	6–2, 3–6, 6–4
Australian Open; Melbourne, Australia; Grand Slam; Hard, outdoor 16–29 January 2012	7	F	(Belarus) Victoria Azarenka	#3	Loss (1)	3–6, 0–6
Fed Cup WG: Russia vs. Spain; Moscow, Russia; Fed Cup; Hard, indoor 4–5 February 2012	8	-	(Spain) Sílvia Soler Espinosa	#77	Win	6–2, 6–1
Open GDF Suez; Paris, France; WTA Premier; Hard, outdoor 6–12 February 2012	-	1R	Bye			
Open GDF Suez; Paris, France; WTA Premier; Hard, outdoor 6–12 February 2012	9	2R	(South Africa) Chanelle Scheepers	#44	Win	6–3, 6–1
Open GDF Suez; Paris, France; WTA Premier; Hard, outdoor 6–12 February 2012	10	QF	(Germany) Angelique Kerber	#27	Loss	4–6, 4–6
BNP Paribas Open; Indian Wells, United States; WTA Premier Mandatory; Hard, outdoor 5–18 March 2012	–	1R	Bye			
BNP Paribas Open; Indian Wells, United States; WTA Premier Mandatory; Hard, outdoor 5–18 March 2012	11	2R	(Argentina) Gisela Dulko	#126	Win	6–2, 6–0
BNP Paribas Open; Indian Wells, United States; WTA Premier Mandatory; Hard, outdoor 5–18 March 2012	12	3R	(Romania) Simona Halep	#50	Win	6–3, 6–4
BNP Paribas Open; Indian Wells, United States; WTA Premier Mandatory; Hard, outdoor 5–18 March 2012	13	4R	(Italy) Roberta Vinci	#22	Win	6–2, 6–1
BNP Paribas Open; Indian Wells, United States; WTA Premier Mandatory; Hard, outdoor 5–18 March 2012	14	QF	(Russia) Maria Kirilenko	#23	Win	3–6, 7–5, 6–2
BNP Paribas Open; Indian Wells, United States; WTA Premier Mandatory; Hard, outdoor 5–18 March 2012	15	SF	(Serbia) Ana Ivanovic	#16	Win	6–4, 0–1 ret.
BNP Paribas Open; Indian Wells, United States; WTA Premier Mandatory; Hard, outdoor 5–18 March 2012	16	F	(Belarus) Victoria Azarenka	#10	Loss (2)	2–6, 3–6
Sony Ericsson Open; Miami, United States; WTA Premier Mandatory; Hard, outdoor 19 March – 1 April 2013	–	1R	Bye			
Sony Ericsson Open; Miami, United States; WTA Premier Mandatory; Hard, outdoor 19 March – 1 April 2013	17	2R	(Israel) Shahar Pe'er	#55	Win	4–6, 6–3, 6–3
Sony Ericsson Open; Miami, United States; WTA Premier Mandatory; Hard, outdoor 19 March – 1 April 2013	18	3R	(United States) Sloane Stephens	#90	Win	6–4, 6–2
Sony Ericsson Open; Miami, United States; WTA Premier Mandatory; Hard, outdoor 19 March – 1 April 2013	19	4R	(Russia) Ekaterina Makarova	#41	Win	6–4, 7–6^{(7–3)}
Sony Ericsson Open; Miami, United States; WTA Premier Mandatory; Hard, outdoor 19 March – 1 April 2013	20	QF	(China) Li Na	#8	Win	6–3, 6–0
Sony Ericsson Open; Miami, United States; WTA Premier Mandatory; Hard, outdoor 19 March – 1 April 2013	21	SF	(Denmark) Caroline Wozniacki	#6	Win	4–6, 6–2, 6–4
Sony Ericsson Open; Miami, United States; WTA Premier Mandatory; Hard, outdoor 19 March – 1 April 2013	22	F	(Poland) Agnieszka Radwańska	#4	Loss (3)	5–7, 4–6
Porsche Tennis Grand Prix; Stuttgart, Germany; WTA Premier; Clay, indoor 23–29 April 2012	–	1R	Bye			
Porsche Tennis Grand Prix; Stuttgart, Germany; WTA Premier; Clay, indoor 23–29 April 2012	23	2R	(France) Alizé Cornet	#100	Win	6–3, 1–0 ret.
Porsche Tennis Grand Prix; Stuttgart, Germany; WTA Premier; Clay, indoor 23–29 April 2012	24	QF	(Australia) Samantha Stosur	#5	Win	6–7^{(5–7)}, 7–6^{(7–5)}, 7–5
Porsche Tennis Grand Prix; Stuttgart, Germany; WTA Premier; Clay, indoor 23–29 April 2012	25	SF	(Czech Republic) Petra Kvitová	#3	Win	6–4, 7–6^{(7–3)}
Porsche Tennis Grand Prix; Stuttgart, Germany; WTA Premier; Clay, indoor 23–29 April 2012	26	F	(Belarus) Victoria Azarenka	#1	Win (1)	6–1, 6–3
Mutua Madrid Open; Madrid, Spain; WTA Premier Mandatory; Clay (blue), outdoor 7–13 May 2012	27	1R	(Romania) Irina-Camelia Begu	#55	Win	6–0, 6–3
Mutua Madrid Open; Madrid, Spain; WTA Premier Mandatory; Clay (blue), outdoor 7–13 May 2012	28	2R	(Czech Republic) Klára Koukalová	#44	Win	6–4, 6–3
Mutua Madrid Open; Madrid, Spain; WTA Premier Mandatory; Clay (blue), outdoor 7–13 May 2012	-	3R	(Czech Republic) Lucie Šafářová	#23	Walkover	N/A
Mutua Madrid Open; Madrid, Spain; WTA Premier Mandatory; Clay (blue), outdoor 7–13 May 2012	29	QF	(United States) Serena Williams	#9	Loss	1–6, 3–6
Internazionali BNL d'Italia; Rome, Italy; WTA Premier 5 Clay, outdoor 14–20 May 2012	–	1R	Bye			
Internazionali BNL d'Italia; Rome, Italy; WTA Premier 5 Clay, outdoor 14–20 May 2012	30	2R	(United States) Christina McHale	#36	Win	7–5, 7–5
Internazionali BNL d'Italia; Rome, Italy; WTA Premier 5 Clay, outdoor 14–20 May 2012	31	3R	(Serbia) Ana Ivanovic	#15	Win	7–6^{(7–3)}, 6–3
Internazionali BNL d'Italia; Rome, Italy; WTA Premier 5 Clay, outdoor 14–20 May 2012	32	QF	(United States) Venus Williams	#63	Win	6–4, 6–3
Internazionali BNL d'Italia; Rome, Italy; WTA Premier 5 Clay, outdoor 14–20 May 2012	33	SF	(Germany) Angelique Kerber	#11	Win	6–3, 6–4
Internazionali BNL d'Italia; Rome, Italy; WTA Premier 5 Clay, outdoor 14–20 May 2012	34	F	(China) Li Na	#9	Win (2)	4–6, 6–4, 7–6^{(7–5)}
French Open; Paris, France; Grand Slam; Clay, outdoor 28 May – 10 June 2012	35	1R	(Romania) Alexandra Cadanțu	#78	Win	6–0, 6–0
French Open; Paris, France; Grand Slam; Clay, outdoor 28 May – 10 June 2012	36	2R	(Japan) Ayumi Morita	#84	Win	6–1, 6–1
French Open; Paris, France; Grand Slam; Clay, outdoor 28 May – 10 June 2012	37	3R	(China) Peng Shuai	#30	Win	6–2, 6–1
French Open; Paris, France; Grand Slam; Clay, outdoor 28 May – 10 June 2012	38	4R	(Czech Republic) Klára Koukalová	#44	Win	6–4, 6–7^{(5–7)}, 6–2
French Open; Paris, France; Grand Slam; Clay, outdoor 28 May – 10 June 2012	39	QF	(Estonia) Kaia Kanepi	#23	Win	6–2, 6–3
French Open; Paris, France; Grand Slam; Clay, outdoor 28 May – 10 June 2012	40	SF	(Czech Republic) Petra Kvitová	#4	Win	6–3, 6–3
French Open; Paris, France; Grand Slam; Clay, outdoor 28 May – 10 June 2012	41	F	(Italy) Sara Errani	#24	Win (3)	6–3, 6–2
Wimbledon Championships; London, United Kingdom; Grand Slam; Grass, outdoor 25 June – 8 July 2012	42	1R	(Australia) Anastasia Rodionova	#133	Win	6–2, 6–3
Wimbledon Championships; London, United Kingdom; Grand Slam; Grass, outdoor 25 June – 8 July 2012	43	2R	(Bulgaria) Tsvetana Pironkova	#38	Win	7–6^{(7–3)}, 6–7^{(3–7)}, 6–0
Wimbledon Championships; London, United Kingdom; Grand Slam; Grass, outdoor 25 June – 8 July 2012	44	3R	(Chinese Taipei) Su-Wei Hsieh	#63	Win	6–1, 6–4
Wimbledon Championships; London, United Kingdom; Grand Slam; Grass, outdoor 25 June – 8 July 2012	45	4R	(Germany) Sabine Lisicki	#15	Loss	4–6, 3–6
2012 Summer Olympics; London, United Kingdom; Olympic Games; Grass, outdoor 27 July–5 August 2012	46	1R	(Israel) Shahar Pe'er	#49	Win	6–2, 6–0
2012 Summer Olympics; London, United Kingdom; Olympic Games; Grass, outdoor 27 July–5 August 2012	47	2R	(United Kingdom) Laura Robson	#76	Win	7–6^{(7–5)}, 6–3
2012 Summer Olympics; London, United Kingdom; Olympic Games; Grass, outdoor 27 July–5 August 2012	48	3R	(Germany) Sabine Lisicki	#17	Win	6–7^{(8–10)}, 6–4, 6–3
2012 Summer Olympics; London, United Kingdom; Olympic Games; Grass, outdoor 27 July–5 August 2012	49	QF	(Belgium) Kim Clijsters	#36	Win	6–2, 7–5
2012 Summer Olympics; London, United Kingdom; Olympic Games; Grass, outdoor 27 July–5 August 2012	50	SF	(Russia) Maria Kirilenko	#15	Win	6–2, 6–3
2012 Summer Olympics; London, United Kingdom; Olympic Games; Grass, outdoor 27 July–5 August 2012	51	F	(United States) Serena Williams	#4	Loss (4)	0–6, 1–6
US Open; New York City, United States; Grand Slam; Hard, outdoor 27 August – 9 September 2012	52	1R	(Hungary) Melinda Czink	#88	Win	6–2, 6–2
US Open; New York City, United States; Grand Slam; Hard, outdoor 27 August – 9 September 2012	53	2R	(Spain) Lourdes Domínguez Lino	#78	Win	6–0, 6–1
US Open; New York City, United States; Grand Slam; Hard, outdoor 27 August – 9 September 2012	54	3R	(United States) Mallory Burdette	#252	Win	6–1, 6–1
US Open; New York City, United States; Grand Slam; Hard, outdoor 27 August – 9 September 2012	55	4R	(Russia) Nadia Petrova	#22	Win	6–1, 4–6, 6–4
US Open; New York City, United States; Grand Slam; Hard, outdoor 27 August – 9 September 2012	56	QF	(France) Marion Bartoli	#11	Win	3–6, 6–3, 6–4
US Open; New York City, United States; Grand Slam; Hard, outdoor 27 August – 9 September 2012	57	SF	(Belarus) Victoria Azarenka	#1	Loss	6–3, 2–6, 4–6
Toray Pan Pacific Open; Tokyo, Japan; WTA Premier 5 Hard, outdoor 23–28 September 2013	-	1R	Bye			
Toray Pan Pacific Open; Tokyo, Japan; WTA Premier 5 Hard, outdoor 23–28 September 2013	58	2R	(United Kingdom) Heather Watson	#78	Win	6–7^{(7–9)}, 6–3, 6–4
Toray Pan Pacific Open; Tokyo, Japan; WTA Premier 5 Hard, outdoor 23–28 September 2013	59	3R	(Czech Republic) Lucie Šafářová	#17	Win	6–2, 7–6^{(7–5)}
Toray Pan Pacific Open; Tokyo, Japan; WTA Premier 5 Hard, outdoor 23–28 September 2013	60	QF	(Australia) Samantha Stosur	#9	Loss	4–6, 6–7^{(10–12)}
China Open; Beijing, China; WTA Premier Mandatory; Hard, outdoor 28 September–6 October 2013	61	1R	(Romania) Simona Halep	#47	Win	7–5, 7–5
China Open; Beijing, China; WTA Premier Mandatory; Hard, outdoor 28 September–6 October 2013	62	2R	(Romania) Sorana Cîrstea	#29	Win	6–2, 6–2
China Open; Beijing, China; WTA Premier Mandatory; Hard, outdoor 28 September–6 October 2013	63	3R	(Slovenia) Polona Hercog	#90	Win	6–0, 6–2
China Open; Beijing, China; WTA Premier Mandatory; Hard, outdoor 28 September–6 October 2013	64	QF	(Germany) Angelique Kerber	#6	Win	6–0, 3–0 ret.
China Open; Beijing, China; WTA Premier Mandatory; Hard, outdoor 28 September–6 October 2013	65	SF	(China) Li Na	#47	Win	6–4, 6–0
China Open; Beijing, China; WTA Premier Mandatory; Hard, outdoor 28 September–6 October 2013	66	F	(Belarus) Victoria Azarenka	#1	Loss (5)	3–6, 1–6
WTA Tour Championships; Istanbul, Turkey; Year-End Championship; Hard, indoor 23 – 28 October 2012	67	RR	(Italy) Sara Errani	#7	Win	6–3, 6–2
WTA Tour Championships; Istanbul, Turkey; Year-End Championship; Hard, indoor 23 – 28 October 2012	68	RR	(Poland) Agnieszka Radwańska	#4	Win	5–7, 7–5, 7–5
WTA Tour Championships; Istanbul, Turkey; Year-End Championship; Hard, indoor 23 – 28 October 2012	69	RR	(Australia) Samantha Stosur	#9	Win	6–0, 6–3
WTA Tour Championships; Istanbul, Turkey; Year-End Championship; Hard, indoor 23 – 28 October 2012	70	SF	(Belarus) Victoria Azarenka	#1	Win	6–4, 6–2
WTA Tour Championships; Istanbul, Turkey; Year-End Championship; Hard, indoor 23 – 28 October 2012	71	F	(United States) Serena Williams	#3	Loss (6)	4–6, 3–6

== See also ==
- 2012 Serena Williams tennis season
- 2012 WTA Tour
- Maria Sharapova career statistics
