= 2010 Family Circle Cup =

Women's tennis tournament

- Date: April 12–18
- Edition: 38th
- Category: Premier Mandatory
- Draw: 56S / 16D
- Prize money: $700,000
- Surface: Clay / outdoor
- Location: Charleston, South Carolina, U.S.
- Venue: Family Circle Tennis Center
- Attendance: 95,767

Champions

Singles
- (Australia) Samantha Stosur

Doubles
- (United States) Liezel Huber / (Russia) Nadia Petrova
← 2009 ·	Family Circle Cup	· 2011 →

The 2010 Family Circle Cup was a women's tennis event on the 2010 WTA Tour, which took place from April 12 to April 18. It was the 38th edition of the tournament and was hosted at the Family Circle Tennis Center, in Charleston, South Carolina, United States. It was the second and last event of the clay court season played on green clay. The total prize money offered at this tournament was US$700,000. Samantha Stosur won the singles title.

== Finals ==
=== Singles ===
(Australia) Samantha Stosur defeated (Russia) Vera Zvonareva, 6–0, 6–3

- It was Stosur's first title of the year and second of her career.

=== Doubles ===
(United States) Liezel Huber / (Russia) Nadia Petrova defeated (United States) Vania King / (Netherlands) Michaëlla Krajicek, 6–3, 6–4

== Entrants ==
=== Seeds ===
Athlete	Nationality	Ranking*	Seeding
Caroline Wozniacki	Denmark	2	1
Jelena Janković	Serbia	7	2
Victoria Azarenka	Belarus	9	3
Samantha Stosur	Australia	11	4
Marion Bartoli	France	12	5
Nadia Petrova	Russia	18	6
Vera Zvonareva	Russia	22	7
Daniela Hantuchová	Slovakia	24	8
Alona Bondarenko	Ukraine	25	9
Elena Vesnina	Russia	33	10
Virginie Razzano	France	34	11
Aleksandra Wozniak	Canada	39	12
Melanie Oudin	United States	41	13
Vera Dushevina	Russia	46	14
Melinda Czink	Hungary	47	15
Patty Schnyder	Switzerland	49	16

- Rankings are as of April 5, 2010.

=== Other entrants ===
The following players received wildcards into the main draw:

- (United States) Mallory Cecil
- (United States) Carly Gullickson
- (United States) Alison Riske

The following players received entry from the qualifying draw:

- (Australia) Monique Adamczak (as a lucky loser)
- (Colombia) Catalina Castaño
- (Australia) Sophie Ferguson
- (Russia) Ekaterina Ivanova
- (United States) Christina McHale
- (South Africa) Chanelle Scheepers
- (Georgia (country)) Anna Tatishvili
- (United States) Mashona Washington
- (United Kingdom) Heather Watson

=== Notable withdrawals ===
The following players withdrew from the tournament for various reasons:

- (Ukraine) Kateryna Bondarenko (left knee injury)
- (Slovakia) Dominika Cibulková (right groin injury)
- (Russia) Alisa Kleybanova (bilateral plantar fasciitis)
- (Germany) Sabine Lisicki (left ankle injury)
- (Russia) Maria Sharapova (right elbow bone bruise)
- (United States) Serena Williams (left knee injury)
