= 2012 Family Circle Cup – Singles =

Singles
- 2012 Family Circle Cup

Final
- Champion: (United States) Serena Williams
- Runner-up: (Czech Republic) Lucie Šafářová
- Score: 6–0, 6–1

Details
- Draw: 56
- Seeds: 16

Events
Singles	Doubles
- Family Circle Cup

Caroline Wozniacki was the defending champion, but was not allowed to participate because there were already two top 6 players in the draw.

Serena Williams won the title, defeating Lucie Šafářová in the final 6–0, 6–1. It was her 40th WTA Tour singles title.

== Seeds ==
The top eight seeds received a bye into the second round.

1. (Poland) Agnieszka Radwańska (withdrew because of a back injury)
2. (Australia) Samantha Stosur (semifinals)
3. (France) Marion Bartoli (third round)
4. (Russia) Vera Zvonareva (quarterfinals)
5. (United States) Serena Williams (champion)
6. (Germany) Sabine Lisicki (quarterfinals, retired because of a left ankle injury)
7. (Serbia) Jelena Janković (second round)
8. (Russia) Anastasia Pavlyuchenkova (third round)
9. (Czech Republic) Lucie Šafářová (final)
10. (Spain) Anabel Medina Garrigues (second round)
11. (United States) Christina McHale (first round)
12. (Belgium) Yanina Wickmayer (second round)
13. (Russia) Nadia Petrova (quarterfinals)
14. (Slovenia) Polona Hercog (semifinals)
15. (South Africa) Chanelle Scheepers (first round)
16. (Australia) Jarmila Gajdošová (first round)
17. (New Zealand) Marina Erakovic (third round)

Click on the seed number of a player to go to their draw section.

== Draw ==
Key

- Q = Qualifier
- WC = Wild card
- LL = Lucky loser
- Alt = Alternate
- ITF = ITF entry
- PR = Protected ranking
- SR = Special ranking
- SE = Special exempt
- JE = Junior exempt
- JR = Junior Accelerator Programme entrant
- CO = College Accelerator Programme entrant
- NG = Next Gen Accelerator Program entrant
- w/o = Walkover
- r = Retired
- d = Defaulted

=== Finals ===
Quarterfinals
14	(Slovenia) Polona Hercog	6	6
13	(Russia) Nadia Petrova	1	2
4	(Russia) Vera Zvonareva	3	3
9	(Czech Republic) Lucie Šafářová	6	6
6	(Germany) Sabine Lisicki	1^{r}
5	(United States) Serena Williams	4
WC	(United States) Venus Williams	3	6	3
2	(Australia) Samantha Stosur	6	4	6

Semifinals
14	(Slovenia) Polona Hercog	0	0
9	(Czech Republic) Lucie Šafářová	6	6
5	(United States) Serena Williams	6	6
2	(Australia) Samantha Stosur	1	1

Final
9	(Czech Republic) Lucie Šafářová	0	1
5	(United States) Serena Williams	6	6

=== Top half ===
==== Section 1 ====
First round
(Russia) V Dushevina	6	7^{7}
LL	(Chinese Taipei) Y-j Chan	4	6^{5}
(Belarus) A Yakimova	2	7	2
(United States) V Lepchenko	6	5	6
(Japan) K Date-Krumm	4	3
14	(Slovenia) P Hercog	6	6
13	(Russia) N Petrova	6	6
Q	(Colombia) M Duque Mariño	1	2
Q	(Uzbekistan) A Amanmuradova	6^{2}	6^{6}
Q	(United States) J Craybas	7^{7}	7^{8}
(Greece) E Daniilidou	6	6
(Russia) A Kudryavtseva	3	4

Second round
3	(France) M Bartoli	6	6^{3}	6
(Russia) V Dushevina	2	7^{7}	4
(United States) V Lepchenko	3	2
14	(Slovenia) P Hercog	6	6
13	(Russia) N Petrova	2	7^{8}	6
Q	(United States) J Craybas	6	6^{6}	2
(Greece) E Daniilidou	6	4	4
8/WC	(Russia) A Pavlyuchenkova	3	6	6

Third round
3	(France) M Bartoli	4	6	4
14	(Slovenia) P Hercog	6	1	6
13	(Russia) N Petrova	6	6
8/WC	(Russia) A Pavlyuchenkova	1	4

Quarterfinals
14	(Slovenia) P Hercog	6	6
13	(Russia) N Petrova	1	2

==== Section 2 ====
First round
(Belarus) O Govortsova	6	2	4
(Ukraine) K Bondarenko	2	6	6
(Poland) U Radwańska	1	4
(Czech Republic) L Hradecká	6	6
Q	(Switzerland) S Vögele	6	2	6
16	(Australia) J Gajdošová	4	6	4
11	(United States) C McHale	5	7	4
(Canada) A Wozniak	7	5	6
(Czech Republic) B Záhlavová-Strýcová	6	6
Q	(Italy) C Giorgi	1	3
(Luxembourg) M Minella	5	5
Q	(Croatia) M Lučić	7	7

Second round
4	(Russia) V Zvonareva	6	6
(Ukraine) K Bondarenko	1	1
(Czech Republic) L Hradecká	4	4
Q	(Switzerland) S Vögele	6	6
(Canada) A Wozniak	7^{7}	6
(Czech Republic) B Záhlavová-Strýcová	6^{5}	2
Q	(Croatia) M Lučić	2	0
9	(Czech Republic) L Šafářová	6	6

Third round
4	(Russia) V Zvonareva	5	6	6
Q	(Switzerland) S Vögele	7	3	4
(Canada) A Wozniak	2	7^{7}	1
9	(Czech Republic) L Šafářová	6	6^{4}	6

Quarterfinals
4	(Russia) V Zvonareva	3	3
9	(Czech Republic) L Šafářová	6	6

=== Bottom half ===
==== Section 3 ====
First round
WC	(United States) I Falconi	1	5
LL	(Czech Republic) A Hlaváčková	6	7
Q	(Kazakhstan) Y Shvedova	6	6
(Russia) A Panova	0	4
(United States) V King	4	3
12	(Belgium) Y Wickmayer	6	6
17	(New Zealand) M Erakovic	6	6
Q	(Czech Republic) Ka Plíšková	2	4
(Georgia (country)) A Tatishvili	1	6	6
(Netherlands) A Rus	6	4	4
(Canada) S Dubois	6^{10}	5
(Russia) E Vesnina	7^{12}	7

Second round
6	(Germany) S Lisicki	2	6	6
LL	(Czech Republic) A Hlaváčková	6	3	4
Q	(Kazakhstan) Y Shvedova	6	7^{7}
12	(Belgium) Y Wickmayer	2	6^{2}
17	(New Zealand) M Erakovic	7	6
(Georgia (country)) A Tatishvili	5	3
(Russia) E Vesnina	3	4
5	(United States) S Williams	6	6

Third round
6	(Germany) S Lisicki	7	6
Q	(Kazakhstan) Y Shvedova	5	4
17	(New Zealand) M Erakovic	2	2
5	(United States) S Williams	6	6

Quarterfinals
6	(Germany) S Lisicki	1^{r}
5	(United States) S Williams	4

==== Section 4 ====
First round
Q	(Czech Republic) I Benešová	4	3
WC	(United States) V Williams	6	6
(Australia) A Rodionova	6	2	6
Q	(Hungary) M Czink	2	6	1
Q	(United States) M Oudin	4	6	0
10	(Spain) A Medina Garrigues	6	4	6
15	(South Africa) C Scheepers	1	6	4
Q	(Argentina) P Ormaechea	6	1	6
(Australia) J Dokić	3^{r}
(Kazakhstan) G Voskoboeva	4
WC	(United States) J Hampton	7	7^{7}
(United States) S Stephens	5	6^{1}

Second round
7	(Serbia) J Janković	5	0
WC	(United States) V Williams	7	6
(Australia) A Rodionova	7	6
10	(Spain) A Medina Garrigues	5	3
Q	(Argentina) P Ormaechea	2	3
(Kazakhstan) G Voskoboeva	6	6
WC	(United States) J Hampton	0	5
2	(Australia) S Stosur	6	7

Third round
WC	(United States) V Williams	7	6
(Australia) A Rodionova	5	2
(Kazakhstan) G Voskoboeva	3	6	2
2	(Australia) S Stosur	6	4	6

Quarterfinals
WC	(United States) V Williams	3	6	3
2	(Australia) S Stosur	6	4	6

== Qualifying ==
=== Seeds ===
1. (Czech Republic) Iveta Benešová (qualified)
2. (Romania) Alexandra Cadanțu (first round)
3. (Czech Republic) Eva Birnerová (first round)
4. (Uzbekistan) Akgul Amanmuradova (qualified)
5. (Argentina) Paula Ormaechea (qualified)
6. (Croatia) Mirjana Lučić (qualified)
7. (Czech Republic) Karolína Plíšková (qualified)
8. (Hungary) Melinda Czink (qualified)
9. (Switzerland) Stefanie Vögele (qualified)
10. (Czech Republic) Andrea Hlaváčková (qualifying competition)
11. (United Kingdom) Heather Watson (first round)
12. (Chinese Taipei) Chan Yung-jan (qualifying competition)
13. (United States) Jill Craybas (qualified)
14. (Colombia) Mariana Duque Mariño (qualified)
15. (Spain) Estrella Cabeza Candela (qualifying competition)
16. (France) Caroline Garcia (qualifying competition)
17. (Czech Republic) Kristýna Plíšková (qualifying competition)
18. (Portugal) Michelle Larcher de Brito (qualifying competition)
19. (Italy) Camila Giorgi (qualified)
20. (Kazakhstan) Yaroslava Shvedova (qualified)
21. (United States) Tetiana Luzhanska (first round, retired)
22. (Slovenia) Petra Rampre (qualifying competition)
23. (United States) Julia Cohen (first round)
24. (Bulgaria) Dia Evtimova (first round)

=== Qualifiers ===
1. (Czech Republic) Iveta Benešová
2. (Colombia) Mariana Duque Mariño
3. (United States) Jill Craybas
4. (Uzbekistan) Akgul Amanmuradova
5. (Argentina) Paula Ormaechea
6. (Croatia) Mirjana Lučić
7. (Czech Republic) Karolína Plíšková
8. (Hungary) Melinda Czink
9. (Switzerland) Stefanie Vögele
10. (Kazakhstan) Yaroslava Shvedova
11. (United States) Melanie Oudin
12. (Italy) Camila Giorgi

=== Draw ===
==== First qualifier ====
First round
1	(Czech Republic) Iveta Benešová	6	3	6
(Slovenia) Andreja Klepač	4	6	1
(Russia) Ekaterina Bychkova	6^{5}	4
17	(Czech Republic) Kristýna Plíšková	7^{7}	6

Qualifying competition
1	(Czech Republic) Iveta Benešová	6	4	6
17	(Czech Republic) Kristýna Plíšková	1	6	3

==== Second qualifier ====
First round
2	(Romania) Alexandra Cadanțu	5	6	0
(Poland) Marta Domachowska	7	2	6
(Russia) Olga Puchkova	3	6	4
14	(Colombia) Mariana Duque Mariño	6	3	6

Qualifying competition
(Poland) Marta Domachowska	4	3
14	(Colombia) Mariana Duque Mariño	6	6

==== Third qualifier ====
First round
3	(Czech Republic) Eva Birnerová	7^{14}	1	2
(United States) Madison Brengle	6^{12}	6	6
(United States) Abigail Spears	2	4
13	(United States) Jill Craybas	6	6

Qualifying competition
(United States) Madison Brengle	3	1
13	(United States) Jill Craybas	6	6

==== Fourth qualifier ====
First round
4	(Uzbekistan) Akgul Amanmuradova	6	6
(United States) Gail Brodsky	0	2
(Czech Republic) Vladimíra Uhlířová	1
21	(United States) Tetiana Luzhanska	1^{r}

Qualifying competition
4	(Uzbekistan) Akgul Amanmuradova	6	3	6
(Czech Republic) Vladimíra Uhlířová	3	6	4

==== Fifth qualifier ====
First round
5	(Argentina) Paula Ormaechea	6	6
WC	(United States) Emily Harman	1	0
WC	(United States) Shelby Rogers	5	7	6
23	(United States) Julia Cohen	7	5	3

Qualifying competition
5	(Argentina) Paula Ormaechea	7	6
WC	(United States) Shelby Rogers	5	3

==== Sixth qualifier ====
First round
6	(Croatia) Mirjana Lučić	3	6	6
WC	(United States) Simone Kalhorn	6	2	1
(Colombia) Catalina Castaño	3	7	3
15	(Spain) Estrella Cabeza Candela	6	5	6

Qualifying competition
6	(Croatia) Mirjana Lučić	6	6
15	(Spain) Estrella Cabeza Candela	2	2

==== Seventh qualifier ====
First round
7	(Czech Republic) Karolína Plíšková	6	6^{5}	6
(Belgium) Tamaryn Hendler	1	7^{7}	3
(United States) Alexandra Stevenson	2	3
18	(Portugal) Michelle Larcher de Brito	6	6

Qualifying competition
7	(Czech Republic) Karolína Plíšková	6	6
18	(Portugal) Michelle Larcher de Brito	4	2

==== Eighth qualifier ====
First round
8	(Hungary) Melinda Czink	6	6
WC	(United States) Hayley Carter	1	1
(United States) CoCo Vandeweghe	6	6
24	(Bulgaria) Dia Evtimova	4	3

Qualifying competition
8	(Hungary) Melinda Czink	3	6	6
(United States) CoCo Vandeweghe	6	4	0

==== Ninth qualifier ====
First round
9	(Switzerland) Stefanie Vögele	6	6
(Croatia) Ani Mijačika	1	2
WC	(United States) Maria Sanchez	3	3
16	(France) Caroline Garcia	6	6

Qualifying competition
9	(Switzerland) Stefanie Vögele	4	6	6
16	(France) Caroline Garcia	6	4	2

==== Tenth qualifier ====
First round
10	(Czech Republic) Andrea Hlaváčková	6	6
(France) Kristina Mladenovic	2	4
(United States) Jessica Pegula	4	0
20	(Kazakhstan) Yaroslava Shvedova	6	6

Qualifying competition
10	(Czech Republic) Andrea Hlaváčková	6^{5}	5
20	(Kazakhstan) Yaroslava Shvedova	7^{7}	7

==== Eleventh qualifier ====
First round
11	(United Kingdom) Heather Watson	4	6	4
(United States) Melanie Oudin	6	1	6
(South Africa) Natalie Grandin	3	4
22	(Slovenia) Petra Rampre	6	6

Qualifying competition
(United States) Melanie Oudin	6	6
22	(Slovenia) Petra Rampre	3	2

==== Twelfth qualifier ====
First round
12	(Chinese Taipei) Chan Yung-jan	2	6	7
(United States) Julia Boserup	6	1	5
(United States) Grace Min	4	4
19	(Italy) Camila Giorgi	6	6

Qualifying competition
12	(Chinese Taipei) Chan Yung-jan	7^{7}	5	3
19	(Italy) Camila Giorgi	6^{5}	7	6
