= 2012 Family Circle Cup – Doubles =

Doubles
- 2012 Family Circle Cup

Final
- Champions: (Russia) Anastasia Pavlyuchenkova (Czech Republic) Lucie Šafářová
- Runners-up: (Spain) Anabel Medina Garrigues (Kazakhstan) Yaroslava Shvedova
- Score: 5–7, 6–4, [10–6]

Details
- Draw: 16
- Seeds: 4

Events
Singles	Doubles
← 2011 ·	Family Circle Cup	· 2013 →

Sania Mirza and Elena Vesnina were the defending champions but were defeated in the quarterfinals by Anastasia Pavlyuchenkova and Lucie Šafářová.
The wildcard team then defeated Anabel Medina Garrigues and Yaroslava Shvedova in the final 5–7, 6–4, [10–6].

== Seeds ==
1. (United States) Liezel Huber / (United States) Lisa Raymond (semifinals)
2. (Czech Republic) Květa Peschke / (Slovenia) Katarina Srebotnik (quarterfinals)
3. (India) Sania Mirza / (Russia) Elena Vesnina (quarterfinals)
4. (Czech Republic) Andrea Hlaváčková / (Czech Republic) Lucie Hradecká (quarterfinals)

== Draw ==
=== Key ===
- Q = Qualifier
- WC = Wild card
- LL = Lucky loser
- Alt = Alternate
- SE = Special exempt
- PR = Protected ranking
- ITF = ITF entry
- JE = Junior exempt
- w/o = Walkover
- r = Retired
- d = Defaulted
- SR = Special ranking

=== Draw ===
First round
1	(United States) L Huber (United States) L Raymond	6	6
(Germany) S Lisicki (Russia) V Zvonareva	2	2
WC	(United States) EJ Harman (United States) S Kalhorn	0	1
(Poland) K Jans-Ignacik (Russia) A Kudryavtseva	6	6
3	(India) S Mirza (Russia) E Vesnina	6	6
(Russia) N Petrova (Kazakhstan) G Voskoboeva	4	3
WC	(Russia) A Pavlyuchenkova (Czech Republic) L Šafářová	6	6^{10}	[11]
(Russia) V Dushevina (New Zealand) M Erakovic	3	7^{12}	[9]
(United States) V King (Australia) A Rodionova	5	3
(Spain) A Medina Garrigues (Kazakhstan) Y Shvedova	7	6
(United States) R Kops-Jones (United States) A Spears	3	1
4	(Czech Republic) A Hlaváčková (Czech Republic) L Hradecká	6	6
(South Africa) N Grandin (Czech Republic) V Uhlířová	7	6
(Slovenia) A Klepač (Poland) A Rosolska	5	2
(Czech Republic) I Benešová (Czech Republic) B Záhlavová-Strýcova	3	5
2	(Czech Republic) K Peschke (Slovenia) K Srebotnik	6	7

Quarterfinals
1	(United States) L Huber (United States) L Raymond	7	6
(Poland) K Jans-Ignacik (Russia) A Kudryavtseva	5	2
3	(India) S Mirza (Russia) E Vesnina	7^{7}	5	[7]
WC	(Russia) A Pavlyuchenkova (Czech Republic) L Šafářová	6^{2}	7	[10]
(Spain) A Medina Garrigues (Kazakhstan) Y Shvedova	7^{7}	6
4	(Czech Republic) A Hlaváčková (Czech Republic) L Hradecká	6^{2}	3
(South Africa) N Grandin (Czech Republic) V Uhlířová	7^{10}	6
2	(Czech Republic) K Peschke (Slovenia) K Srebotnik	6^{8}	2

Semifinals
1	(United States) L Huber (United States) L Raymond	4	6^{9}
WC	(Russia) A Pavlyuchenkova (Czech Republic) L Šafářová	6	7^{11}
(Spain) A Medina Garrigues (Kazakhstan) Y Shvedova	6	6
(South Africa) N Grandin (Czech Republic) V Uhlířová	1	3

Final
WC	(Russia) A Pavlyuchenkova (Czech Republic) L Šafářová	5	6	[10]
(Spain) A Medina Garrigues (Kazakhstan) Y Shvedova	7	4	[6]
