= 2011 Family Circle Cup – Singles =

Singles
- 2011 Family Circle Cup

Final
- Champions: (Denmark) Caroline Wozniacki
- Runners-up: (Russia) Elena Vesnina
- Score: 6–2, 6–3

Details
- Draw: 56
- Seeds: 16

Events
Singles	Doubles
- Family Circle Cup

In 2011, world number-one Caroline Wozniacki defeated Elena Vesnina in the final 6–2, 6–3 to win the women's singles tennis title at that year's Charleston Open.

Samantha Stosur was the defending champion, but lost to Vesnina in the third round.

== Seeds ==
The top eight seeds received a bye into the second round.

1. (Denmark) Caroline Wozniacki (champion)
2. (Australia) Samantha Stosur (third round)
3. (Serbia) Jelena Janković (semifinals)
4. (France) Marion Bartoli (second round)
5. (Israel) Shahar Pe'er (third round)
6. (Belgium) Yanina Wickmayer (quarterfinals)
7. (Russia) Nadia Petrova (third round)
8. (Russia) Alisa Kleybanova (second round)
9. (Russia) Maria Kirilenko (second round)
10. (Slovakia) Daniela Hantuchová (third round)
11. (China) Peng Shuai (semifinals)
12. (Germany) Julia Görges (quarterfinals)
13. (Switzerland) Patty Schnyder (first round)
14. (United States) Bethanie Mattek-Sands (second round)
15. (Czech Republic) Barbora Záhlavová-Strýcová (third round)
16. (Russia) Vera Dushevina (first round)

== Draw ==
Key

- Q = Qualifier
- WC = Wild card
- LL = Lucky loser
- Alt = Alternate
- ITF = ITF entry
- PR = Protected ranking
- SR = Special ranking
- SE = Special exempt
- JE = Junior exempt
- JR = Junior Accelerator Programme entrant
- CO = College Accelerator Programme entrant
- NG = Next Gen Accelerator Program entrant
- w/o = Walkover
- r = Retired
- d = Defaulted

=== Finals ===
Quarterfinals
1	(Denmark) Caroline Wozniacki	4	6	6
6	(Belgium) Yanina Wickmayer	6	4	4
3	(Serbia) Jelena Janković	6	6
(United States) Christina McHale	2	0
11	(China) Peng Shuai	2	6	6
Q	(India) Sania Mirza	6	2	2
12	(Germany) Julia Görges	6	2	2
(Russia) Elena Vesnina	2	6	6

Semifinals
1	(Denmark) Caroline Wozniacki	6	6
3	(Serbia) Jelena Janković	4	4
11	(China) Peng Shuai	6^{4}	3
(Russia) Elena Vesnina	7^{7}	6

Final
1	(Denmark) Caroline Wozniacki	6	6
(Russia) Elena Vesnina	2	3

=== Top half ===
==== Section 1 ====
First round
(Slovakia) M Rybáriková	6^{9}	5
Q	(United States) I Falconi	7^{11}	7
(Czech Republic) Z Ondrášková	6	1	2
(Australia) A Rodionova	4	6	6
(Czech Republic) A Hlaváčková	2	6	6^{6}
15	(Czech Republic) B Záhlavová-Strýcová	6	2	7^{8}
9	(Russia) M Kirilenko	6	6
(United States) V Lepchenko	4	0
Q	(Georgia (country)) A Tatishvili	7	2	6
(Australia) J Dokić	5	6	4
(China) J Zheng	3	7^{12}	7
Q	(Puerto Rico) M Puig	6	6^{10}	5

Second round
1	(Denmark) C Wozniacki	6	6
Q	(United States) I Falconi	1	1
(Australia) A Rodionova	3	6	3
15	(Czech Republic) B Záhlavová-Strýcová	6	1	6
9	(Russia) M Kirilenko	7	5	3
Q	(Georgia (country)) A Tatishvili	5	7	6
(China) J Zheng	4	0
6	(Belgium) Y Wickmayer	6	6

Third round
1	(Denmark) C Wozniacki	7^{8}	7^{11}
15	(Czech Republic) B Záhlavová-Strýcová	6^{6}	6^{9}
Q	(Georgia (country)) A Tatishvili	4	5
6	(Belgium) Y Wickmayer	6	7

Quarterfinals
1	(Denmark) C Wozniacki	4	6	6
6	(Belgium) Y Wickmayer	6	4	4

==== Section 2 ====
First round
(Austria) T Paszek	6	7
(United States) M Oudin	1	5
WC	(United States) S Rogers	6	2	0
(United States) J Craybas	3	6	6
(South Africa) C Scheepers	6	6
13	(Switzerland) P Schnyder	4	4
10	(Slovakia) D Hantuchová	6	7^{7}
(Russia) A Kudryavtseva	1	6^{3}
(Croatia) P Martić	4	1
(Russia) E Rodina	6	6
Q	(United Kingdom) H Watson	7	3	6^{3}
(United States) C McHale	5	6	7^{7}

Second round
3	(Serbia) J Janković	6	6
(Austria) T Paszek	2	3
(United States) J Craybas	3	2
(South Africa) C Scheepers	6	6
10	(Slovakia) D Hantuchová	6	6
(Russia) E Rodina	0	1
(United States) C McHale	6	6
8	(Russia) A Kleybanova	1	0

Third round
3	(Serbia) J Janković	6	6
(South Africa) C Scheepers	2	2
10	(Slovakia) D Hantuchová	6^{3}	1
(United States) C McHale	7^{7}	6

Quarterfinals
3	(Serbia) J Janković	6	6
(United States) C McHale	2	0

=== Bottom half ===
==== Section 3 ====
First round
(Romania) E Gallovits-Hall	7^{7}	7
WC	(United States) J Hampton	6^{1}	5
(Croatia) M Lučić	2	4
(Japan) A Morita	6	6
Q	(United States) S Stephens	2	1
11	(China) S Peng	6	6
16	(Russia) V Dushevina	4	6^{7}
(United States) V King	6	7^{9}
Q	(India) S Mirza	2	6	6
(United States) A Riske	6	3	3
WC	(Germany) S Lisicki	3	6	6
(Czech Republic) R Voráčová	6	4	2

Second round
7	(Russia) N Petrova	6	6
(Romania) E Gallovits-Hall	1	1
(Japan) A Morita	2	1
11	(China) S Peng	6	6
(United States) V King	7^{9}	4	2
Q	(India) S Mirza	6^{7}	6	6
WC	(Germany) S Lisicki	6	6
4	(France) M Bartoli	2	3

Third round
7	(Russia) N Petrova	3	7	2
11	(China) S Peng	6	5	6
Q	(India) S Mirza	6	6
WC	(Germany) S Lisicki	4	4

Quarterfinals
11	(China) S Peng	2	6	6
Q	(India) S Mirza	6	2	2

==== Section 4 ====
First round
(France) A Cornet	4	6	3
(Sweden) S Arvidsson	6	2	6
Q	(Czech Republic) E Birnerová	7	2	6
PR	(Hungary) M Czink	5	6	2
(Belarus) O Govortsova	5	4
12	(Germany) J Görges	7	6
14	(United States) B Mattek-Sands	6	6
Q	(United States) A Stevenson	2	1
(Russia) E Vesnina	6^{4}	6	6
(Canada) R Marino	7^{7}	2	3
(Austria) P Mayr-Achleitner	6	6
(China) S Zhang	1	4

Second round
5	(Israel) S Pe'er	6	6
(Sweden) S Arvidsson	1	3
Q	(Czech Republic) E Birnerová	6	5	0^{r}
12	(Germany) J Görges	1	7	2
14	(United States) B Mattek-Sands	4	6^{8}
(Russia) E Vesnina	6	7^{10}
(Austria) P Mayr-Achleitner	1	2
2	(Australia) S Stosur	6	6

Third round
5	(Israel) S Pe'er	2	3
12	(Germany) J Görges	6	6
(Russia) E Vesnina	6	6
2	(Australia) S Stosur	4	1

Quarterfinals
12	(Germany) J Görges	6	2	2
(Russia) E Vesnina	2	6	6

== Qualifying ==
=== Players ===
==== Seeds ====
1. (United States) CoCo Vandeweghe (qualifying competition)
2. (India) Sania Mirza (qualified)
3. (Japan) Junri Namigata (first round)
4. (United Kingdom) Heather Watson (qualified)
5. (Georgia (country)) Anna Tatishvili (qualified)
6. (United States) Irina Falconi (qualified)
7. (Czech Republic) Eva Birnerová (qualified)
8. (Germany) Tatjana Malek (qualifying competition)
9. (Ukraine) Olga Savchuk(qualifying competition)
10. (France) Stéphanie Foretz Gacon (qualifying competition)
11. (United States) Madison Brengle (first round)
12. (United States) Lindsay Lee-Waters (first round)
13. (United States) Sloane Stephens (qualified)
14. (Ukraine) Tetiana Luzhanska (qualifying competition)
15. (Slovakia) Lenka Wienerová (qualifying competition)
16. (Russia) Ekaterina Bychkova (qualifying competition)

==== Qualifiers ====
1. (United States) Alexandra Stevenson
2. (India) Sania Mirza
3. (United States) Sloane Stephens
4. (United Kingdom) Heather Watson
5. (Georgia (country)) Anna Tatishvili
6. (United States) Irina Falconi
7. (Czech Republic) Eva Birnerová
8. (Puerto Rico) Monica Puig

=== Qualifying draw ===
==== First qualifier ====
First round
1	(United States) CoCo Vandeweghe	7^{7}	6
WC	(South Africa) Natalie Grandin	6^{5}	4
(United States) Alexandra Stevenson	7	6
12	(United States) Lindsay Lee-Waters	5	2

Qualifying competition
1	(United States) CoCo Vandeweghe	2	6	4
(United States) Alexandra Stevenson	6	2	6

==== Second qualifier ====
First round
2	(India) Sania Mirza	6	3	6
(Australia) Johanna Konta	2	6	3
(United States) Krista Hardebeck	6^{6}	6	3
9	(Ukraine) Olga Savchuk	7^{8}	4	6

Qualifying competition
2	(India) Sania Mirza	6	6
9	(Ukraine) Olga Savchuk	4	3

==== Third qualifier ====
First round
3	(Japan) Junri Namigata	4	6	2
WC	(Canada) Gabriela Dabrowski	6	1	6
WC	(Belarus) Tatiana Poutchek	2	3
13	(United States) Sloane Stephens	6	6

Qualifying competition
WC	(Canada) Gabriela Dabrowski	3	1
13	(United States) Sloane Stephens	6	6

==== Fourth qualifier ====
First round
4	(United Kingdom) Heather Watson	7	6
WC	(United States) Josephine Kuhlman	5	1
(United States) Ashley Weinhold	7^{7}	3	3
15	(Slovakia) Lenka Wienerová	6^{4}	6	6

Qualifying competition
4	(United Kingdom) Heather Watson	6	7^{7}
15	(Slovakia) Lenka Wienerová	1	6^{2}

==== Fifth qualifier ====
First round
5	(Georgia (country)) Anna Tatishvili	7	6
(Venezuela) Gabriela Paz	5	4
(United States) Beatrice Capra	5	4
14	(Ukraine) Tetiana Luzhanska	7	6

Qualifying competition
5	(Georgia (country)) Anna Tatishvili	6	6
14	(Ukraine) Tetiana Luzhanska	2	2

==== Sixth qualifier ====
First round
6	(United States) Irina Falconi	6	4	6
(United States) Abigail Spears	3	6	4
WC	(United States) Lauren Davis	2	1
10	(France) Stéphanie Foretz Gacon	6	6

Qualifying competition
6	(United States) Irina Falconi	7^{7}	7
10	(France) Stéphanie Foretz Gacon	6^{5}	5

==== Seventh qualifier ====
First round
7	(Czech Republic) Eva Birnerová	7	6
(United States) Mashona Washington	5	2
(United States) Ahsha Rolle	6	4	4
16	(Russia) Ekaterina Bychkova	4	6	6

Qualifying competition
7	(Czech Republic) Eva Birnerová	6	6
16	(Russia) Ekaterina Bychkova	3	2

==== Eighth qualifier ====
First round
8	(Germany) Tatjana Malek	6	5	6
WC	(United States) Jessica Pegula	3	7	1
WC	(Puerto Rico) Monica Puig	2	6	7
11	(United States) Madison Brengle	6	3	5

Qualifying competition
8	(Germany) Tatjana Malek	7	4	3
WC	(Puerto Rico) Monica Puig	5	6	6
