= 2011 Family Circle Cup – Doubles =

Doubles
- 2011 Family Circle Cup

Final
- Champions: (India) Sania Mirza (Russia) Elena Vesnina
- Runners-up: (United States) Bethanie Mattek-Sands (United States) Meghann Shaughnessy
- Score: 6–4, 6–4

Details
- Draw: 16
- Seeds: 4

Events
Singles	Doubles
← 2010 ·	Family Circle Cup	· 2012 →

Liezel Huber and Nadia Petrova were the defending champions but decided not to defend their title together.
Huber partnered up with Lisa Raymond but lost to Sania Mirza and Elena Vesnina in the first round.
Meanwhile, Petrova played alongside Julia Görges but lost in the second round to top seeds Květa Peschke and Katarina Srebotnik.

Mirza and Vesnina reached the final, where they won against the American pair of Bethanie Mattek-Sands and Meghann Shaughnessy 6–4, 6–4.

== Seeds ==
1. (Czech Republic) Květa Peschke / (Slovenia) Katarina Srebotnik (semifinals)
2. (United States) Liezel Huber / (United States) Lisa Raymond (first round)
3. (United States) Vania King / (Czech Republic) Barbora Záhlavová-Strýcová (first round, retired)
4. (United States) Bethanie Mattek-Sands / (United States) Meghann Shaughnessy (final)

== Draw ==
=== Key ===
- Q = Qualifier
- WC = Wild card
- LL = Lucky loser
- Alt = Alternate
- SE = Special exempt
- PR = Protected ranking
- ITF = ITF entry
- JE = Junior exempt
- w/o = Walkover
- r = Retired
- d = Defaulted
- SR = Special ranking

=== Draw ===
First round
1	(Czech Republic) K Peschke (Slovenia) K Srebotnik	6	6
(Russia) V Dushevina (Belarus) T Poutchek	1	1
(Russia) A Kleybanova (China) Z Yan	6	4	[3]
(Germany) J Görges (Russia) N Petrova	2	6	[10]
4	(United States) B Mattek-Sands (United States) M Shaughnessy	4	7	[10]
(South Africa) N Grandin (Czech Republic) V Uhlířová	6	5	[0]
(Slovakia) D Hantuchová (Russia) M Kirilenko	6^{8}	6	[16]
(Czech Republic) A Hlaváčková (Czech Republic) R Voráčová	7^{10}	2	[14]
(Russia) M Kondratieva (France) S Lefèvre	6^{5}	7^{7}	[7]
(United States) R Kops-Jones (United States) A Spears	7^{7}	6^{5}	[10]
(China) S Peng (China) J Zheng	2
3	(United States) V King (Czech Republic) B Záhlavová-Strýcová	3^{r}
WC	(United States) S Rogers (Switzerland) P Schnyder	4	7^{10}	[6]
(Russia) A Kudryavtseva (Australia) A Rodionova	6	6^{8}	[10]
(India) S Mirza (Russia) E Vesnina	6	6
2	(United States) L Huber (United States) L Raymond	3	4

Quarterfinals
1	(Czech Republic) K Peschke (Slovenia) K Srebotnik	6	7
(Germany) J Görges (Russia) N Petrova	3	5
4	(United States) B Mattek-Sands (United States) M Shaughnessy	7	7^{7}
(Slovakia) D Hantuchová (Russia) M Kirilenko	5	6^{2}
(United States) R Kops-Jones (United States) A Spears	3	4
(China) S Peng (China) J Zheng	6	6
(Russia) A Kudryavtseva (Australia) A Rodionova	6	2	[8]
(India) S Mirza (Russia) E Vesnina	3	6	[10]

Semifinals
1	(Czech Republic) K Peschke (Slovenia) K Srebotnik	2	4
4	(United States) B Mattek-Sands (United States) M Shaughnessy	6	6
(China) S Peng (China) J Zheng	2	5
(India) S Mirza (Russia) E Vesnina	6	7

Final
4	(United States) B Mattek-Sands (United States) M Shaughnessy	4	4
(India) S Mirza (Russia) E Vesnina	6	6
