= 2010 Family Circle Cup – Singles =

Singles
- 2010 Family Circle Cup

Final
- Champion: (Australia) Samantha Stosur
- Runner-up: (Russia) Vera Zvonareva
- Score: 6–0, 6–3

Details
- Draw: 56
- Seeds: 16

Events
| Singles | Doubles |
- Family Circle Cup

Sabine Lisicki was the defending champion, but chose not to compete due to a left ankle injury.

Samantha Stosur won the title, defeating Vera Zvonareva in the final 6–0, 6–3.

== Seeds ==
The top eight seeds receive a bye into the second round.

1. (Denmark) Caroline Wozniacki (semifinals, retired due to sprained ankle)
2. (Serbia) Jelena Janković (quarterfinals)
3. (Belarus) Victoria Azarenka (second round, retired due to a left thigh strain)
4. (Australia) Samantha Stosur (champion)
5. (France) Marion Bartoli (second round, retired due to dizziness and stomach upset)
6. (Russia) Nadia Petrova (quarterfinals)
7. (Russia) Vera Zvonareva (final)
8. (Slovakia) Daniela Hantuchová (semifinals)
9. (Ukraine) Alona Bondarenko (third round)
10. (Russia) Elena Vesnina (third round)
11. (France) Virginie Razzano (first round)
12. (Canada) Aleksandra Wozniak (third round)
13. (United States) Melanie Oudin (quarterfinals)
14. (Russia) Vera Dushevina (third round)
15. (Hungary) Melinda Czink (first round)
16. (Switzerland) Patty Schnyder (third round)

== Draw ==
Key

- Q = Qualifier
- WC = Wild card
- LL = Lucky loser
- Alt = Alternate
- ITF = ITF entry
- PR = Protected ranking
- SR = Special ranking
- SE = Special exempt
- JE = Junior exempt
- JR = Junior Accelerator Programme entrant
- CO = College Accelerator Programme entrant
- NG = Next Gen Accelerator Program entrant
- w/o = Walkover
- r = Retired
- d = Defaulted

=== Finals ===
Quarterfinals
1 | (Denmark) Caroline Wozniacki | 6 | 6
6 | (Russia) Nadia Petrova | 3 | 4
13 | (United States) Melanie Oudin | 5 | 2
7 | (Russia) Vera Zvonareva | 7 | 6
(China) Peng Shuai | 4 | 1
4 | (Australia) Samantha Stosur | 6 | 6
8 | (Slovakia) Daniela Hantuchová | 1 | 6 | 6
2 | (Serbia) Jelena Janković | 6 | 3 | 3

Semifinals
1 | (Denmark) Caroline Wozniacki | 2^{r}
7 | (Russia) Vera Zvonareva | 5
4 | (Australia) Samantha Stosur | 6 | 7
8 | (Slovakia) Daniela Hantuchová | 3 | 6^{2}

Final
7 | (Russia) Vera Zvonareva | 0 | 3
4 | (Australia) Samantha Stosur | 6 | 6

=== Top half ===
==== Section 1 ====
First round
(Czech Republic) B Záhlavová-Strýcová | 6 | 6
WC | (United States) C Gullickson | 2 | 3
(Portugal) M Larcher de Brito | 6 | 4 | 6
(Russia) V Manasieva | 2 | 6 | 3
Q | (South Africa) C Scheepers | 6 | 2 | 4
16 | (Switzerland) P Schnyder | 3 | 6 | 6
12 | (Canada) A Wozniak | 6 | 7
(United States) L Osterloh | 3 | 6^{9}
Q | (Colombia) C Castaño | 7 | 6
Q | (Georgia (country)) A Tatishvili | 5 | 2
(Australia) A Rodionova | 5 | 0
(United States) V King | 7 | 6

Second round
1 | (Denmark) C Wozniacki | 6 | 6
(Czech Republic) B Záhlavová-Strýcová | 4 | 1
(Portugal) M Larcher de Brito | 3 | 1
16 | (Switzerland) P Schnyder | 6 | 6
12 | (Canada) A Wozniak | 6 | 4 | 6
Q | (Colombia) C Castaño | 2 | 6 | 4
(United States) V King | 2 | 1
6 | (Russia) N Petrova | 6 | 6

Third round
1 | (Denmark) C Wozniacki | 6 | 7
16 | (Switzerland) P Schnyder | 2 | 5
12 | (Canada) A Wozniak | 2 | 4
6 | (Russia) N Petrova | 6 | 6

Quarterfinals
1 | (Denmark) C Wozniacki | 6 | 6
6 | (Russia) N Petrova | 3 | 4

==== Section 2 ====
First round
Q | (United States) C McHale | 3 | 7 | 6
(Russia) A Kudryavtseva | 6 | 6^{4} | 3
Q | (United States) M Washington | 7 | 4 | 3
Q | (Australia) S Ferguson | 5 | 6 | 6
(United States) J Craybas | 3 | 1
13 | (United States) M Oudin | 6 | 6
9 | (Ukraine) A Bondarenko | 6 | 6
(United States) J Ditty | 4 | 2
(Germany) J Görges | 7 | 4 | 5
(United States) B Mattek-Sands | 6^{1} | 6 | 7
(Paraguay) R de los Ríos | 6 | 6
WC | (United States) M Cecil | 0 | 4

Second round
3 | (Belarus) V Azarenka | 6 | 2^{r}
Q | (United States) C McHale | 2 | 2
Q | (Australia) S Ferguson | 2 | 4
13 | (United States) M Oudin | 6 | 6
9 | (Ukraine) A Bondarenko | 4 | 7 | 7
(United States) B Mattek-Sands | 6 | 5 | 5
(Paraguay) R de los Ríos | 2 | 0
7 | (Russia) V Zvonareva | 6 | 6

Third round
Q | (United States) C McHale | 4 | 0
13 | (United States) M Oudin | 6 | 6
9 | (Ukraine) A Bondarenko | 2 | 1
7 | (Russia) V Zvonareva | 6 | 6

Quarterfinals
13 | (United States) M Oudin | 5 | 2
7 | (Russia) V Zvonareva | 7 | 6

=== Bottom half ===
==== Section 3 ====
First round
(United States) S Perry | 3 | 6 | 1
(China) S Peng | 6 | 2 | 6
(Latvia) A Sevastova | 1 | 2
(Sweden) S Arvidsson | 6 | 6
Q | (United Kingdom) H Watson | 6^{4} | 3
10 | (Russia) E Vesnina | 7 | 6
14 | (Russia) V Dushevina | 6 | 2
(Belarus) O Govortsova | 0 | 0^{r}
(Chinese Taipei) K-c Chang | 1 | 6 | 6
(Russia) E Makarova | 6 | 2 | 3
(Canada) S Fichman | 5 | 2
(Slovakia) M Rybáriková | 7 | 6

Second round
5 | (France) M Bartoli | 6 | 6^{2} | 3^{r}
(China) S Peng | 2 | 7 | 4
(Sweden) S Arvidsson | 5 | 2
10 | (Russia) E Vesnina | 7 | 6
14 | (Russia) V Dushevina | 6 | 6
(Chinese Taipei) K-c Chang | 2 | 2
(Slovakia) M Rybáriková | 3 | 5
4 | (Australia) S Stosur | 6 | 7

Third round
(China) S Peng | 7 | 2 | 6
10 | (Russia) E Vesnina | 5 | 6 | 2
14 | (Russia) V Dushevina | 1 | 6 | 1
4 | (Australia) S Stosur | 6 | 3 | 6

Quarterfinals
(China) S Peng | 4 | 1
4 | (Australia) S Stosur | 6 | 6

==== Section 4 ====
First round
(Colombia) M Duque Mariño | 4 | 5
(Japan) A Morita | 6 | 7
(Germany) A Kerber | 6 | 6
WC | (United States) A Riske | 2 | 4
LL | (Australia) M Adamczak | 4 | 6 | 6
11 | (France) V Razzano | 6 | 0 | 2
15 | (Hungary) M Czink | 6^{9} | 3
(Netherlands) M Krajicek | 7 | 6
(Russia) E Rodina | 6 | 6
Q | (Russia) E Ivanova | 4 | 1
(Romania) E Gallovits | 6 | 6
(United States) V Lepchenko | 3 | 3

Second round
8 | (Slovakia) D Hantuchová | 6 | 2
(Japan) A Morita | 4 | 0^{r}
(Germany) A Kerber | 6 | 6
LL | (Australia) M Adamczak | 3 | 2
(Netherlands) M Krajicek | 3 | 6 | 2
(Russia) E Rodina | 6 | 2 | 6
(Romania) E Gallovits | 6 | 4 | 3
2 | (Serbia) J Janković | 2 | 6 | 6

Third round
8 | (Slovakia) D Hantuchová | 6^{6} | 7 | 6
(Germany) A Kerber | 7 | 5 | 3
(Russia) E Rodina | 3 | 1
2 | (Serbia) J Janković | 6 | 6

Quarterfinals
8 | (Slovakia) D Hantuchová | 1 | 6 | 6
2 | (Serbia) J Janković | 6 | 3 | 3
