= 2011 Family Circle Cup =

- Date: April 4–10
- Edition: 39th
- Category: Premier level
- Draw: 56S / 16D
- Prize money: $721,000
- Surface: Clay / outdoor
- Location: Charleston, SC, US
- Venue: Family Circle Tennis Center
- Attendance: 94,241

Champions

Singles
- (Denmark) Caroline Wozniacki

Doubles
- (India) Sania Mirza / (Russia) Elena Vesnina
← 2010 ·	Family Circle Cup	· 2012 →

The 2011 Family Circle Cup was a women's tennis event on the 2011 WTA Tour. It took place from April 4 to April 10, 2011. It was the 39th edition of the tournament and one of the Premier level tournaments. The event was hosted at the Family Circle Tennis Center, on Daniel Island, Charleston, South Carolina, United States. It was the only event of the clay court season played on green clay. The total prize money offered at this tournament was US$711,000

The field was led by top seed and World No. 1 Caroline Wozniacki and defending champion Samantha Stosur. They were joined by former champions Jelena Janković, Nadia Petrova, and Sabine Lisicki.

== Finals ==
=== Singles ===
- (Denmark) Caroline Wozniacki defeated (Russia) Elena Vesnina, 6–2, 6–3

It was Wozniacki's 3rd title of the year and 15th of her career. It was her 1st Premier-level title of the year and 4th of her career.

=== Doubles ===
- (India) Sania Mirza / (Russia) Elena Vesnina defeated (United States) Bethanie Mattek-Sands / (United States) Meghann Shaughnessy, 6–4, 6–4

== Prize money & points distribution ==
=== Points distribution ===
Stage	Women's singles	Women's doubles
Champion	470	
Runner up	320	
Semifinals	200	
Quarterfinals	120	
Round of 16	60	1
Round of 32	40	–
Round of 64	1	–
Qualifier	12	–
Qualifying final round	8	–
Qualifying first round	1	–

=== Prize money ===
The total commitment prize money for this year's event is $721,000.

Stage	Women's singles	Women's doubles (per team)
Champion	$111,000	$35,500
Runner up	$57,350	$19,000
Semifinals	$29,205	$9,500
Quarterfinals	$15,200	$4,900
Round of 16	$7,850	$2,500
Round of 32	$4,000	–
Round of 64	$2,025	–
Qualifying final round	$1,035	–
Qualifying first round	$535	–

== Entrants ==
=== Seeds ===
Country	Player	Rank^{1}	Seed
DEN	Caroline Wozniacki	1	1
AUS	Samantha Stosur	5	2
SRB	Jelena Janković	7	3
FRA	Marion Bartoli	10	4
ISR	Shahar Pe'er	11	5
BEL	Yanina Wickmayer	20	6
RUS	Nadia Petrova	22	7
RUS	Alisa Kleybanova	26	8
RUS	Maria Kirilenko	27	9
SVK	Daniela Hantuchová	30	10
CHN	Peng Shuai	32	11
GER	Julia Görges	35	12
SUI	Patty Schnyder	41	13
USA	Bethanie Mattek-Sands	43	14
CZE	Barbora Záhlavová-Strýcová	50	15
RUS	Vera Dushevina	53	16

- Rankings are as of March 21, 2011.

=== Other entrants ===
The following players received wildcards into the main draw:

- (United States) Jamie Hampton
- (Germany) Sabine Lisicki
- (United States) Shelby Rogers

The following players received entry from the qualifying draw:

- (Czech Republic) Eva Birnerová
- (United States) Irina Falconi
- (India) Sania Mirza
- (Puerto Rico) Monica Puig
- (United States) Sloane Stephens
- (United States) Alexandra Stevenson
- (Georgia (country)) Anna Tatishvili
- (United Kingdom) Heather Watson

=== Withdrawals ===
- (Uzbekistan) Akgul Amanmuradova
- (Ukraine) Viktoriya Kutuzova
- (United States) Serena Williams (foot injury & pulmonary embolism)
