= 2010 Family Circle Cup – Doubles =

Doubles
- 2010 Family Circle Cup

Final
- Champions: (Russia) Nadia Petrova (United States) Liezel Huber
- Runners-up: (United States) Vania King (Netherlands) Michaëlla Krajicek
- Score: 6–3, 6–4

Details
- Draw: 16
- Seeds: 4

Events
Singles	Doubles
← 2009 ·	Family Circle Cup	· 2011 →

Bethanie Mattek-Sands and Nadia Petrova were the defenders of championship title; however, they chose not to play together.
Mattek-Sands partnered up with Yan Zi, but they lost to Natalie Grandin and Abigail Spears in the quarterfinals.
Petrova chose to play with Liezel Huber and they won in the final 6–3, 6–4, against Vania King and Michaëlla Krajicek.

== Seeds ==
1. (United States) Liezel Huber / (Russia) Nadia Petrova (champions)
2. (United States) Lisa Raymond / (Australia) Rennae Stubbs (quarterfinals)
3. (United States) Bethanie Mattek-Sands / (China) Yan Zi (quarterfinals)
4. (China) Peng Shuai / (Russia) Elena Vesnina (quarterfinals, Vesnina withdrew due to a left adductor muscle strain)

== Draw ==
=== Key ===
- Q = Qualifier
- WC = Wild card
- LL = Lucky loser
- Alt = Alternate
- SE = Special exempt
- PR = Protected ranking
- ITF = ITF entry
- JE = Junior exempt
- w/o = Walkover
- r = Retired
- d = Defaulted
- SR = Special ranking

=== Draw ===
First round
1	(United States) L Huber (Russia) N Petrova	6	7
(Australia) An Rodionova (Russia) Ar Rodionova	3	6^{5}
Alt	(Hungary) M Czink (Canada) S Fichman	6	6
(United States) J Ditty (United States) C Gullickson	4	4
4	(China) S Peng (Russia) E Vesnina	0	6	[10]
WC	(Denmark) M Ejdesgaard (Denmark) C Wozniacki	6	3	[2]
(Ukraine) A Bondarenko (Kazakhstan) G Voskoboeva	6	4	[7]
(Russia) E Makarova (Canada) M-È Pelletier	4	6	[10]
(Germany) J Görges (Czech Republic) B Záhlavová-Strýcová	3	4
(South Africa) N Grandin (United States) A Spears	6	6
WC	(United States) M Oudin (United States) S Perry	3	4
3	(United States) B Mattek-Sands (China) Z Yan	6	6
(Latvia) L Dekmeijere (Switzerland) P Schnyder	2	1
(United States) V King (Netherlands) M Krajicek	6	6
(Belarus) E Dzehalevich (Ukraine) O Savchuk	6	1	[10]
2	(United States) L Raymond (Australia) R Stubbs	3	6	[12]

Quarterfinals
1	(United States) L Huber (Russia) N Petrova	7	6
Alt	(Hungary) M Czink (Canada) S Fichman	5	1
4	(China) S Peng (Russia) E Vesnina
(Russia) E Makarova (Canada) M-È Pelletier	w/o
(South Africa) N Grandin (United States) A Spears	6	4	[10]
3	(United States) B Mattek-Sands (China) Z Yan	3	6	[5]
(United States) V King (Netherlands) M Krajicek	6	6
2	(United States) L Raymond (Australia) R Stubbs	4	1

Semifinals
1	(United States) L Huber (Russia) N Petrova	6	6
(Russia) E Makarova (Canada) M-È Pelletier	2	2
(South Africa) N Grandin (United States) A Spears	4	6^{4}
(United States) V King (Netherlands) M Krajicek	6	7

Finals
1	(United States) L Huber (Russia) N Petrova	6	6
(United States) V King (Netherlands) M Krajicek	3	4
