= 2012 Fed Cup World Group II =

Part of tennis tournament

The World Group II was the second highest level of Fed Cup competition in 2012. Winners advanced to the World Group play-offs, and the losing nations advancing to the World Group II play-offs.

== United States vs. Belarus ==
United States
5
DCU Center, Worcester, MA, United States
4–5 February 2012
Premier hard (indoor)

Belarus
0

			1	2	3
1	(United States) (Belarus)	Christina McHale; Anastasiya Yakimova	6; 0	6; 4
2	(United States) (Belarus)	Serena Williams; Olga Govortsova	7; 5	6; 0
3	(United States) (Belarus)	Serena Williams; Anastasiya Yakimova	5; 7	6; 1	6; 1
4	(United States) (Belarus)	Christina McHale; Darya Kustova	6; 0	6; 1
5	(United States) (Belarus)	Liezel Huber / Venus Williams; Darya Kustova / Anastasiya Yakimova	6; 1	6; 2

== Japan vs. Slovenia ==
Japan
5
Ariake Coliseum, Tokyo, Japan
4–5 February 2012
Decoturf (indoor)

Slovenia
0

			1	2	3
1	(Japan) (Slovenia)	Kimiko Date-Krumm; Polona Hercog	2; 6	6; 4	6; 2
2	(Japan) (Slovenia)	Ayumi Morita; Nastja Kolar	2; 6	6; 4	6; 3
3	(Japan) (Slovenia)	Ayumi Morita; Polona Hercog	3; 6	7^{8} 6^{6}	6; 1
4	(Japan) (Slovenia)	Kurumi Nara; Petra Rampre	6; 4	6; 4
5	(Japan) (Slovenia)	Rika Fujiwara / Ayumi Morita; Nastja Kolar / Petra Rampre	6; 3	5; 7	6; 0

== Slovakia vs. France ==
Slovakia
3
Sibamac Center, Bratislava, Slovakia
4–5 February 2012
Latex-ite hard (indoor)

France
2

			1	2	3
1	(Slovakia) (France)	Daniela Hantuchová; Pauline Parmentier	5; 7	6; 1	9; 7
2	(Slovakia) (France)	Dominika Cibulková; Virginie Razzano	4; 6	4; 6
3	(Slovakia) (France)	Dominika Cibulková; Pauline Parmentier	6; 4	6; 3
4	(Slovakia) (France)	Daniela Hantuchová; Alizé Cornet	6; 3	6; 4
5	(Slovakia) (France)	Jana Čepelová / Magdaléna Rybáriková; Kristina Mladenovic / Virginie Razzano	1; 6	2; 6

== Switzerland vs. Australia ==
Switzerland
1
Forum Fribourg, Granges-Paccot, Switzerland
4–5 February 2012
Red clay (indoor)

Australia
4

			1	2	3
1	(Switzerland) (Australia)	Timea Bacsinszky; Samantha Stosur	2; 6	5; 7
2	(Switzerland) (Australia)	Stefanie Vögele; Jarmila Gajdošová	6; 0	6^{8} 7^{10}	8; 6
3	(Switzerland) (Australia)	Stefanie Vögele; Samantha Stosur	3; 6	2; 6
4	(Switzerland) (Australia)	Amra Sadiković; Jarmila Gajdošová	3; 6	6; 3	6; 8
5	(Switzerland) (Australia)	Belinda Bencic / Amra Sadiković; Casey Dellacqua / Jelena Dokić	5; 7	4; 6

== See also ==
- Fed Cup structure
