= 2012 Family Circle Cup =

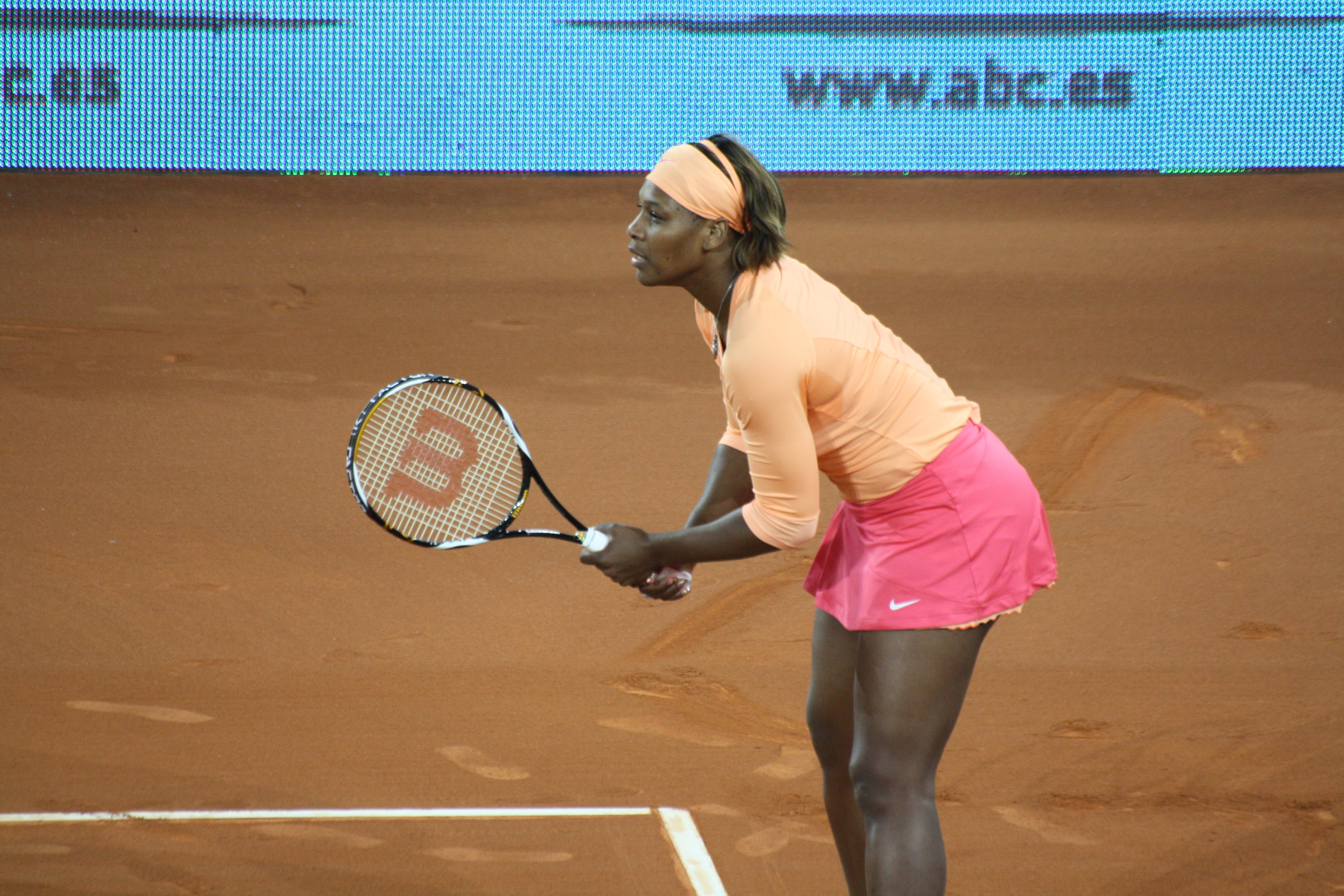
- Date: March 31 – April 8
- Edition: 40th
- Draw: 56S / 16D
- Prize money: $740,000
- Surface: Clay / outdoor
- Location: Charleston, South Carolina, United States
- Venue: Family Circle Tennis Center
- Attendance: 87,972

Champions

Singles
- (United States) Serena Williams

Doubles
- (Russia) Anastasia Pavlyuchenkova / (Czech Republic) Lucie Šafářová
← 2011 ·	Family Circle Cup	· 2013 →

The 2012 Family Circle Cup was a women's tennis event in the 2012 WTA Tour. It took place from March 31 to April 8, 2012. It was the 40th edition of the tournament and a Premier level tournament. The event was hosted at the Family Circle Tennis Center, on Daniel Island, Charleston, South Carolina, United States. It was the only event of the clay courts season played on green clay. The total prize money offered at this tournament was US$749,160

== Finals ==
=== Singles ===
- (United States) Serena Williams defeated (Czech Republic) Lucie Šafářová 6–0, 6–1.

It was Serena's 40th career singles title and her 4th overall on clay.

=== Doubles ===
- (Russia) Anastasia Pavlyuchenkova / (Czech Republic) Lucie Šafářová defeated (Spain) Anabel Medina Garrigues / (Kazakhstan) Yaroslava Shvedova, 5–7, 6–4, [10–6]

== Singles main draw entrants ==
=== Seeds ===
Country	Player	Ranking^{1}	Seed
~~POL~~	~~Agnieszka Radwańska~~	~~4~~	~~1~~
AUS	Samantha Stosur	5	2
FRA	Marion Bartoli	7	3
RUS	Vera Zvonareva	9	4
USA	Serena Williams	11	5
GER	Sabine Lisicki	13	6
SRB	Jelena Janković	15	7
RUS	Anastasia Pavlyuchenkova	21	8
CZE	Lucie Šafářová	25	9
ESP	Anabel Medina Garrigues	27	10
USA	Christina McHale	32	11
BEL	Yanina Wickmayer	33	12
RUS	Nadia Petrova	35	13
SLO	Polona Hercog	38	14
RSA	Chanelle Scheepers	42	15
AUS	Jarmila Gajdošová	45	16
NZL	Marina Erakovic	49	17

- ^{1} Rankings as of March 19, 2012

=== Other entrants ===
The following players received wildcards into the main draw:

- (United States) Irina Falconi
- (United States) Jamie Hampton
- (Russia) Anastasia Pavlyuchenkova
- (United States) Venus Williams

The following players received entry from the qualifying draw:

- (Uzbekistan) Akgul Amanmuradova
- (Czech Republic) Iveta Benešová
- (United States) Jill Craybas
- (Hungary) Melinda Czink
- (Colombia) Mariana Duque-Mariño
- (Italy) Camila Giorgi
- (Croatia) Mirjana Lučić
- (Argentina) Paula Ormaechea
- (United States) Melanie Oudin
- (Czech Republic) Karolína Plíšková
- (Kazakhstan) Yaroslava Shvedova
- (Switzerland) Stefanie Vögele

The following players received entry as lucky losers:

- (Chinese Taipei) Chan Yung-jan
- (Czech Republic) Andrea Hlaváčková

=== Withdrawals ===
- (Romania) Irina-Camelia Begu (right elbow injury)
- (Germany) Julia Görges (illness)
- (China) Zheng Jie (low back injury)
- (Japan) Ayumi Morita
- (Poland) Agnieszka Radwańska (back injury)
- (China) Peng Shuai (right shoulder injury)

=== Retirements ===
- (Australia) Jelena Dokić
- (Germany) Sabine Lisicki (left ankle injury)

== Doubles main draw entrants ==
=== Seeds ===
Country	Player	Country	Player	Rank^{1}	Seed
USA	Liezel Huber	USA	Lisa Raymond	3	1
CZE	Květa Peschke	SLO	Katarina Srebotnik	7	2
IND	Sania Mirza	RUS	Elena Vesnina	15	3
CZE	Andrea Hlaváčková	CZE	Lucie Hradecká	19	4

- ^{1} Rankings are as of March 19, 2012

=== Other entrants ===
The following pairs received wildcards into the doubles main draw:

- (United States) Emily J. Harman / (United States) Simone Kalhorn
- (Russia) Anastasia Pavlyuchenkova / (Czech Republic) Lucie Šafářová
