= 2012 Fed Cup World Group play-offs =

Part of tennis tournament

The World Group play-offs were four ties which involved the losing nations of the World Group first round and the winning nations of the World Group II. Nations that won their play-off ties entered the 2013 World Group, while losing nations joined the 2013 World Group II.

== Ukraine vs. United States ==
Ukraine
0
Superior Golf & Spa Resort, Kharkiv, Ukraine
21–22 April 2012
Clay (outdoors)

United States
5

			1	2	3
1	(Ukraine) (United States)	Lesia Tsurenko; Christina McHale	1; 6	6; 4	3; 6
2	(Ukraine) (United States)	Elina Svitolina; Serena Williams	2; 6	1; 6
3	(Ukraine) (United States)	Lesia Tsurenko; Serena Williams	3; 6	2; 6
4	(Ukraine) (United States)	Elina Svitolina; Christina McHale	5; 7	3; 6
5	(Ukraine) (United States)	Lyudmyla Kichenok / Nadiya Kichenok; Liezel Huber / Sloane Stephens	4; 6	1; 6

== Japan vs. Belgium ==
Japan
4
Ariake Coliseum, Tokyo, Japan
21–22 April 2012
Hard (indoors)

Belgium
1

			1	2	3
1	(Japan) (Belgium)	Ayumi Morita; Alison van Uytvanck	6; 4	6; 4
2	(Japan) (Belgium)	Kimiko Date-Krumm; Tamaryn Hendler	6; 1	6; 4
3	(Japan) (Belgium)	Ayumi Morita; Tamaryn Hendler	7; 5	6; 2
4	(Japan) (Belgium)	Kurumi Nara; Alison van Uytvanck	6^{1} 7^{7}	0; 6
5	(Japan) (Belgium)	Rika Fujiwara / Kimiko Date-Krumm; Ysaline Bonaventure / Alison van Uytvanck	6; 2	6; 4

== Spain vs. Slovakia ==
Spain
2
Club de Tenis Puente Romano, Marbella, Spain
21–22 April 2012
Clay (outdoors)

Slovakia
3

			1	2	3
1	(Spain) (Slovakia)	Lourdes Domínguez Lino; Dominika Cibulková	3; 6	0; 6
2	(Spain) (Slovakia)	Silvia Soler Espinosa; Daniela Hantuchová	7^{7} 6^{5}	6; 4
3	(Spain) (Slovakia)	Silvia Soler Espinosa; Dominika Cibulková	4; 6	4; 6
4	(Spain) (Slovakia)	Lourdes Domínguez Lino; Daniela Hantuchová	6; 0	6^{4} 7^{7}	4; 6
5	(Spain) (Slovakia)	Nuria Llagostera Vives / Arantxa Parra Santonja; Magdaléna Rybáriková / Anna Karolína Schmiedlová	6; 0	6^{7} 7^{9}	6; 3

== Germany vs. Australia ==
Germany
2
Porsche Arena, Stuttgart, Germany
21–22 April 2012
Clay (indoors)

Australia
3

			1	2	3
1	(Germany) (Australia)	Angelique Kerber; Samantha Stosur	6^{1} 7^{7}	4; 6
2	(Germany) (Australia)	Julia Görges; Jarmila Gajdošová	4; 6	4; 6
3	(Germany) (Australia)	Andrea Petkovic; Samantha Stosur	4; 6	1; 6
4	(Germany) (Australia)	Angelique Kerber; Olivia Rogowska	6; 3	6; 3
5	(Germany) (Australia)	Andrea Petkovic / Julia Görges; Casey Dellacqua / Jarmila Gajdošová	6; 3	6; 4

== See also ==
- Fed Cup structure
