= 2025 Queen's Club Championships – Men's singles =

Men's singles
- 2025 Queen's Club Championships

Final
- Champion: (Spain) Carlos Alcaraz
- Runner-up: (Czech Republic) Jiří Lehečka
- Score: 7–5, 6–7^{(5–7)}, 6–2

Details
- Draw: 32 (4Q / 3WC)
- Seeds: 8

Events
Singles	men	women
Doubles	men	women
← 2024 ·	Queen's Club Championships	· 2026 →

Carlos Alcaraz defeated Jiří Lehečka in the final, 7–5, 6–7^{(5–7)}, 6–2 to win the men's singles tennis title at the 2025 Queen's Club Championships. It was his second Queen's Club title (after 2023) and 21st career ATP Tour title.

Tommy Paul was the reigning champion, but withdrew before the tournament began.

== Seeds ==
1. (Spain) Carlos Alcaraz (champion)
2. (United Kingdom) Jack Draper (semifinals)
3. (United States) Taylor Fritz (first round)
4. (Denmark) Holger Rune (quarterfinals)
5. (Australia) Alex de Minaur (first round)
6. (United States) Ben Shelton (first round)
7. (United States) Frances Tiafoe (first round)
8. (Czech Republic) Jakub Menšík (second round)

== Draw ==
Key

- Q = Qualifier
- WC = Wild card
- LL = Lucky loser
- Alt = Alternate
- ITF = ITF entry
- PR = Protected ranking
- SR = Special ranking
- SE = Special exempt
- JE = Junior exempt
- JR = Junior Accelerator Programme entrant
- CO = College Accelerator Programme entrant
- NG = Next Gen Accelerator Program entrant
- w/o = Walkover
- r = Retired
- d = Defaulted

=== Finals ===
Semifinals
1	(Spain) Carlos Alcaraz	6	6
(Spain) Roberto Bautista Agut	4	4
(Czech Republic) Jiří Lehečka	6	4	7
2	(United Kingdom) Jack Draper	4	6	5

Final
1	(Spain) Carlos Alcaraz	7	6^{5}	6
(Czech Republic) Jiří Lehečka	5	7^{7}	2

=== Top half ===
First round
1	(Spain) C Alcaraz	6	7^{7}
LL	(Australia) A Walton	4	6^{4}
(Australia) J Thompson	5	0^{r}
(Spain) J Munar	7	0
PR	(United States) R Opelka	7^{8}	6
(Argentina) C Ugo Carabelli	6^{6}	4
LL	(France) A Rinderknech	7^{7}	7^{7}
6	(United States) B Shelton	6^{5}	6^{4}
4	(Denmark) H Rune	6	6
LL	(Australia) C O'Connell	3	4
Q	(United States) M McDonald	6	6
(France) G Monfils	4	4
(Spain) R Bautista Agut	6^{6}	7	6
(Portugal) N Borges	7^{8}	5	4
WC	(United Kingdom) C Norrie	6^{6}	6	1
8	(Czech Republic) J Menšík	7^{8}	1	6

Second round
1	(Spain) C Alcaraz	6	6^{7}	7
(Spain) J Munar	4	7^{9}	5
PR	(United States) R Opelka	5	6^{3}
LL	(France) A Rinderknech	7	7^{7}
4	(Denmark) H Rune	2	6	6
Q	(United States) M McDonald	6	1	1
(Spain) R Bautista Agut	3	6	7
8	(Czech Republic) J Menšík	6	3	5

Quarterfinals
1	(Spain) C Alcaraz	7	6
LL	(France) A Rinderknech	5	4
4	(Denmark) H Rune	6^{5}	7^{7}	2
(Spain) R Bautista Agut	7^{7}	6^{4}	6

Semifinals
1	(Spain) C Alcaraz	6	6
(Spain) R Bautista Agut	4	4

=== Bottom half ===
First round
5	(Australia) A de Minaur	4	2
(Czech Republic) J Lehečka	6	6
(Canada) G Diallo	6	3	6
WC	(United Kingdom) B Harris	1	6	4
(United Kingdom) J Fearnley	6	6
Q	(Australia) A Bolt	2	4
Q	(France) C Moutet	6^{5}	7^{9}	7
3	(United States) T Fritz	7^{7}	6^{7}	5
7	(United States) F Tiafoe	5	2
WC	(United Kingdom) D Evans	7	6
(United States) B Nakashima	6^{10}	7^{7}	6
(France) G Mpetshi Perricard	7^{12}	6^{5}	4
(Australia) A Popyrin	6	6^{9}	7^{7}
Q	(Australia) A Vukic	2	7^{11}	6^{3}
PR	(United States) J Brooksby	3	1
2	(United Kingdom) J Draper	6	6

Second round
(Czech Republic) J Lehečka	6	6
(Canada) G Diallo	4	2
(United Kingdom) J Fearnley	6	2	6
Q	(France) C Moutet	3	6	2
WC	(United Kingdom) D Evans	5	6^{4}
(United States) B Nakashima	7	7^{7}
(Australia) A Popyrin	6	2	6^{5}
2	(United Kingdom) J Draper	3	6	7^{7}

Quarterfinals
(Czech Republic) J Lehečka	7	6
(United Kingdom) J Fearnley	5	2
(United States) B Nakashima	4	7	4
2	(United Kingdom) J Draper	6	5	6

Semifinals
(Czech Republic) J Lehečka	6	4	7
2	(United Kingdom) J Draper	4	6	5

== Qualifying ==
=== Seeds ===
1. (China) Bu Yunchaokete (first round)
2. (Serbia) Hamad Medjedovic (first round)
3. (Italy) Mattia Bellucci (first round)
4. (Australia) Rinky Hijikata (withdrew)
5. (United States) Aleksandar Kovacevic (first round)
6. (Australia) Aleksandar Vukic (qualified)
7. (Australia) Christopher O'Connell (qualifying competition, lucky loser)
8. (France) Arthur Rinderknech (qualifying competition, lucky loser)

=== Qualifiers ===
1. (United States) Mackenzie McDonald
2. (Australia) Aleksandar Vukic
3. (France) Corentin Moutet
4. (Australia) Alex Bolt

=== Lucky losers ===
1. (France) Arthur Rinderknech
2. (Australia) Christopher O'Connell
3. (Australia) Adam Walton

=== Draw ===
==== First qualifier ====
First round
1	(China) Bu Yunchaokete	6^{0}	6^{6}
WC	(United Kingdom) Henry Searle	7^{7}	7^{8}
(United States) Mackenzie McDonald	6	7^{8}
5	(United States) Aleksandar Kovacevic	2	6^{6}

Qualifying competition
WC	(United Kingdom) Henry Searle	4	2
(United States) Mackenzie McDonald	6	6

==== Second qualifier ====
First round
2	(Serbia) Hamad Medjedovic	6^{5}	2
(Australia) Adam Walton	7^{7}	6
(Argentina) Juan Manuel Cerúndolo	4	3
6	(Australia) Aleksandar Vukic	6	6

Qualifying competition
(Australia) Adam Walton	4	4
6	(Australia) Aleksandar Vukic	6	6

==== Third qualifier ====
First round
3	(Italy) Mattia Bellucci	6^{3}	6	3
(France) Corentin Moutet	7^{7}	4	6
WC	(United Kingdom) Johannus Monday	6^{2}	6^{2}
8	(France) Arthur Rinderknech	7^{7}	7^{7}

Qualifying competition
(France) Corentin Moutet	6	3	7
8	(France) Arthur Rinderknech	3	6	5

==== Fourth qualifier ====
First round
Alt	(Australia) Alex Bolt	6	6
WC	(United Kingdom) Jay Clarke	3	4
(Australia) James Duckworth	6^{4}	0
7	(Australia) Christopher O'Connell	7^{7}	6

Qualifying competition
Alt	(Australia) Alex Bolt	3	7^{7}	6
7	(Australia) Christopher O'Connell	6	6^{4}	3
