= 2013 Sparta Prague Open – Singles =

Singles
- 2013 Sparta Prague Open

Final
- Champion: (Czech Republic) Lucie Šafářová
- Runner-up: (Romania) Alexandra Cadanțu
- Score: 3–6, 6–1, 6–1

Details
- Draw: 32
- Seeds: 8

Events
Singles	Doubles
← 2012 ·	Sparta Prague Open	· 2014 →

Lucie Šafářová was the defending champion, having won the event in 2012. She successfully defended her title, defeating Alexandra Cadanțu in the final, 3–6, 6–1, 6–1.

== Seeds ==
1. (Czech Republic) Klára Zakopalová (first round)
2. (Czech Republic) Lucie Šafářová (champion)
3. (Czech Republic) Lucie Hradecká (first round)
4. (Germany) Annika Beck (first round)
5. (Sweden) Johanna Larsson (first round)
6. (Slovakia) Jana Čepelová (semifinals)
7. (Puerto Rico) Monica Puig (quarterfinals)
8. (Japan) Misaki Doi (second round)

== Main draw ==
=== Key ===
- Q = Qualifier
- WC = Wild card
- LL = Lucky loser
- Alt = Alternate
- SE = Special exempt
- PR = Protected ranking
- ITF = ITF entry
- JE = Junior exempt
- w/o = Walkover
- r = Retired
- d = Defaulted
- SR = Special ranking

=== Finals ===
Semifinals
(United States) Irina Falconi	2	6^{4}
(Romania) Alexandra Cadanțu	6	7^{7}
6	(Slovakia) Jana Čepelová	0	5
2	(Czech Republic) Lucie Šafářová	6	7

Final
(Romania) Alexandra Cadanțu	6	1	1
2	(Czech Republic) Lucie Šafářová	3	6	6

=== Top half ===
First round
1	(Czech Republic) K Zakopalová	6	6^{4}	2
(United States) I Falconi	4	7^{7}	6
(Ukraine) E Svitolina	6	3	6
Q	(United States) B Pera	1	6	4
(United States) M Sanchez	6	6
(Greece) E Daniilidou	2	2
WC	(Czech Republic) T Smitková	6	6
5	(Sweden) J Larsson	2	4
4	(Germany) A Beck	1	4
(Romania) A Cadanțu	6	6
Q	(Croatia) A Vrljić	4	6	6
(Israel) S Pe'er	6	4	3
(Serbia) V Dolonc	6	6
Q	(Czech Republic) S Záhlavová	2	4
WC	(Slovakia) AK Schmiedlová	1	1
8	(Japan) M Doi	6	6

Second round
(United States) I Falconi	7	6
(Ukraine) E Svitolina	5	3
(United States) M Sanchez	4	6	6
WC	(Czech Republic) T Smitková	6	3	4
(Romania) A Cadanțu	6	6
Q	(Croatia) A Vrljić	4	3
(Serbia) V Dolonc	4	6	6
8	(Japan) M Doi	6	3	2

Quarterfinals
(United States) I Falconi	3	6	7
(United States) M Sanchez	6	4	5
(Romania) A Cadanțu	6	6
(Serbia) V Dolonc	3	4

Semifinals
(United States) I Falconi	2	6^{4}
(Romania) A Cadanțu	6	7^{7}

=== Bottom half ===
First round
6	(Slovakia) J Čepelová	7	6
(United States) J Cohen	5	4
Q	(Canada) G Dabrowski	5
(United States) A Glatch	1^{r}
(Russia) N Bratchikova	3	1
SE	(Czech Republic) B Záhlavová-Strýcová	6	6
(Hungary) M Czink	6	7^{7}
3/WC	(Czech Republic) L Hradecká	3	6^{5}
7	(Puerto Rico) M Puig	6	7
(Australia) O Rogowska	3	5
WC	(Czech Republic) K Siniaková	4	4
(Uzbekistan) A Amanmuradova	6	6
(Czech Republic) Kr Plíšková	4	2
(Austria) Y Meusburger	6	6
(Serbia) A Krunić	4	3
2	(Czech Republic) L Šafářová	6	6

Second round
6	(Slovakia) J Čepelová	6	1	7
Q	(Canada) G Dabrowski	4	6	5
SE	(Czech Republic) B Záhlavová-Strýcová	1	6	6
(Hungary) M Czink	6	4	3
7	(Puerto Rico) M Puig	7^{7}	6
(Uzbekistan) A Amanmuradova	6^{4}	4
(Austria) Y Meusburger	6^{4}	3
2	(Czech Republic) L Šafářová	7^{7}	6

Quarterfinals
6	(Slovakia) J Čepelová	6^{3}	6	7
SE	(Czech Republic) B Záhlavová-Strýcová	7^{7}	1	5
7	(Puerto Rico) M Puig	7^{7}	4	2
2	(Czech Republic) L Šafářová	6^{5}	6	6

Semifinals
6	(Slovakia) J Čepelová	0	5
2	(Czech Republic) L Šafářová	6	7
