= 2025 Queen's Club Championships =

- Date: 9–15 June (women); 16–22 June (men)
- Edition: 82nd (women); 122nd (men)
- Category: ATP Tour 500 / WTA 500
- Draw: 32S / 16D (men); 28S / 16D (women)
- Prize money: $1,415,000 (women) €2,522,220 (men)
- Surface: Grass
- Location: London, United Kingdom
- Venue: Queen's Club

Champions

Men's singles
- (Spain) Carlos Alcaraz

Women's singles
- (Germany) Tatjana Maria

Men's doubles
- (United Kingdom) Julian Cash / (United Kingdom) Lloyd Glasspool

Women's doubles
- (United States) Asia Muhammad / (Netherlands) Demi Schuurs
- Queen's Club Championships

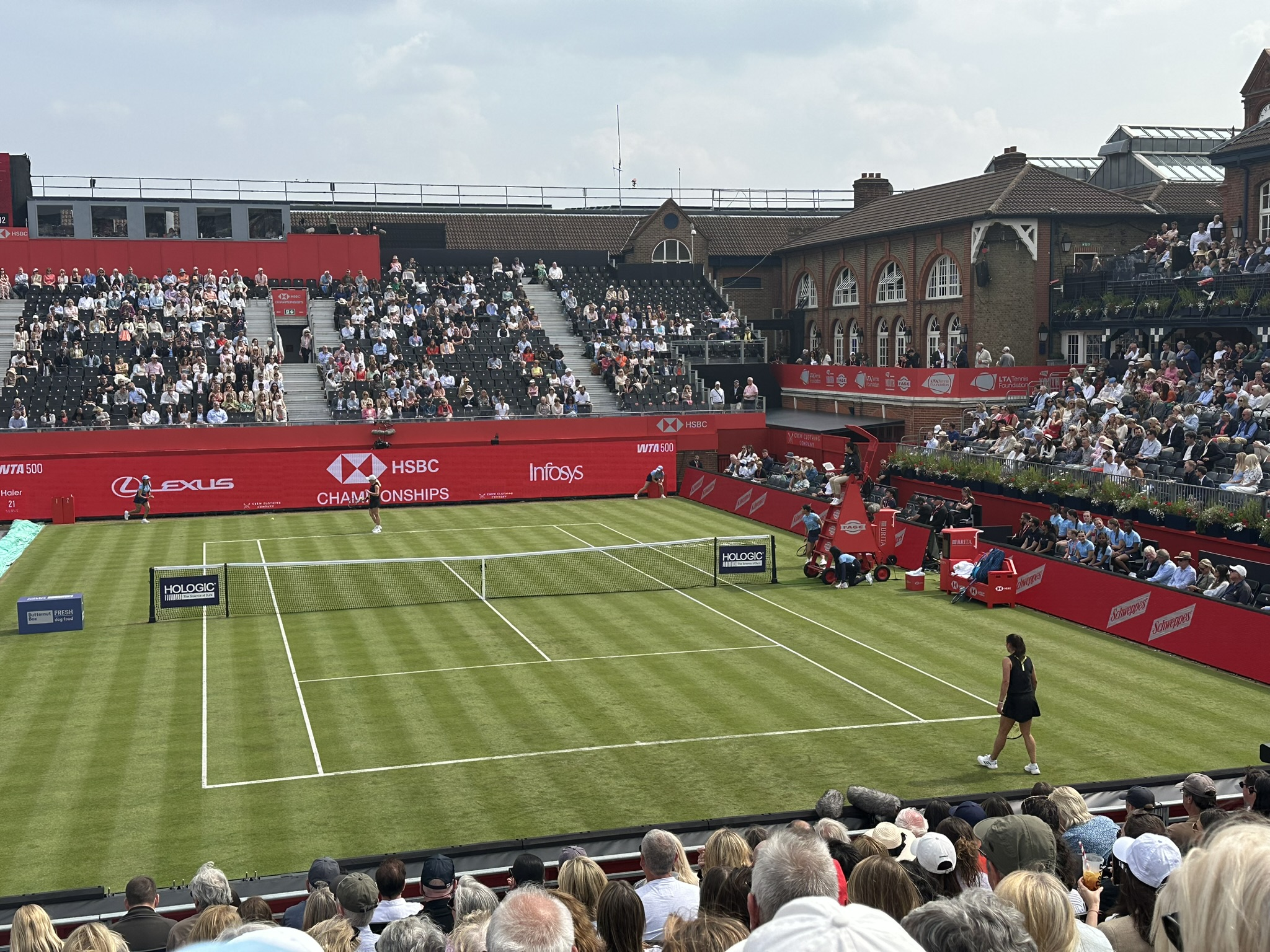
In 2025 Queen's hosted women's tennis for the first time since 1973.

The 2025 Queen's Club Championships (also known as the HSBC Championships for sponsorship reasons) was a professional tennis tournament played on outdoor grass courts at the Queen's Club in London, United Kingdom. It was the 122nd edition of the event for the men and the 82nd edition for the women, the latter returning after a 52-year absence. The women's event was classified as a WTA 500 tournament on the 2025 WTA Tour and took place from 9 to 15 June. The men's event was classified as an ATP Tour 500 tournament on the 2025 ATP Tour and took place from 16 to 22 June.

== Champions ==
=== Men's singles ===
- (Spain) Carlos Alcaraz def. (Czech Republic) Jiří Lehečka, 7–5, 6–7^{(5–7)}, 6–2

=== Women's singles ===
- (Germany) Tatjana Maria def. (United States) Amanda Anisimova, 6–3, 6–4

=== Men's doubles ===
- (United Kingdom) Julian Cash / (United Kingdom) Lloyd Glasspool def. (Croatia) Nikola Mektić / (New Zealand) Michael Venus, 6–3, 6–7^{(5–7)}, [10–6]

=== Women's doubles ===
- (United States) Asia Muhammad / (Netherlands) Demi Schuurs def. (Kazakhstan) Anna Danilina / Diana Shnaider, 7–5, 6–7^{(3–7)}, [10–4]

== Points and prize money ==
=== Point distribution ===
Event	W	F	SF	QF	Round of 16	Round of 32	Q	Q2	Q1
Men's singles	500	330	200	100	50	0	25	13	0
Men's doubles	500	300	180	90	0	—N/a	45	25	0
Women's singles	500	325	195	108	60	1	25	13	1
Women's doubles	500	325	195	108	1	—N/a	—N/a	—N/a	—N/a

=== Prize money ===
Event	W	F	SF	QF	Round of 16	Round of 32	Q	Q2	Q1
Men's singles	€471,755	€253,790	€135,255	€69,100	€36,885	€19,670	—N/a	€10,080	€5,655
Men's doubles**	€154,930	€82,620	€41,800	€20,910	€10,820	—N/a	—N/a	—N/a	—N/a
Women's singles	$218,930	$134,260	$78,425	$38,142	$20,875	$15,020	—N/a	$10,135	$5,185
Women's doubles**	$72,120	$43,860	$25,470	$13,080	$7,970	—N/a	—N/a	—N/a	—N/a

* Players with byes receive first-round points.
** Per team.

== ATP singles main-draw entrants ==
=== Seeds ===
Country	Player	Rank^{1}	Seed
ESP	Carlos Alcaraz	2	1
GBR	Jack Draper	4	2
USA	Taylor Fritz	7	3
DEN	Holger Rune	9	4
AUS	Alex de Minaur	10	5
USA	Ben Shelton	12	6
USA	Frances Tiafoe	13	7
CZE	Jakub Menšík	17	8

- ^{1} Rankings are as of 9 June 2025.

=== Other entrants ===
The following players received wildcards into the main draw:

- (United Kingdom) Dan Evans
- (United Kingdom) Billy Harris
- (United Kingdom) Cameron Norrie

The following players received entry using a protected ranking:

- (United States) Jenson Brooksby
- (United States) Reilly Opelka

The following players received entry from the qualifying draw:

- (Australia) Alex Bolt
- (United States) Mackenzie McDonald
- (France) Corentin Moutet
- (Australia) Aleksandar Vukic

The following players received entry as lucky losers:

- (Australia) Christopher O'Connell
- (France) Arthur Rinderknech
- (Australia) Adam Walton

=== Withdrawals ===
- (Italy) Matteo Arnaldi → replaced by (Australia) Christopher O'Connell
- (Italy) Matteo Berrettini → replaced by (United States) Jenson Brooksby
- (Spain) Alejandro Davidovich Fokina → replaced by (Australia) Adam Walton
- (Bulgaria) Grigor Dimitrov → replaced by (France) Arthur Rinderknech
- (United States) Sebastian Korda → replaced by (Canada) Gabriel Diallo
- (Australia) Nick Kyrgios → replaced by (France) Gaël Monfils
- (Italy) Lorenzo Musetti → replaced by (Spain) Roberto Bautista Agut
- (United States) Tommy Paul → replaced by (Argentina) Camilo Ugo Carabelli

== ATP doubles main-draw entrants ==
=== Seeds ===
Country	Player	Country	Player	Rank^{1}	Seed
ESA	Marcelo Arévalo	CRO	Mate Pavić	2	1
FIN	Harri Heliövaara	GBR	Henry Patten	7	2
GBR	Joe Salisbury	GBR	Neal Skupski	26	3
GBR	Julian Cash	GBR	Lloyd Glasspool	27	4

- ^{1} Rankings are as of 9 June 2025.

=== Other entrants ===
The following pairs received wildcards into the doubles main draw:

- (United Kingdom) Jacob Fearnley / (United Kingdom) Cameron Norrie
- (United Kingdom) David Stevenson / (United Kingdom) Marcus Willis

The following pair received entry from the qualifying draw:

- (India) Rohan Bopanna / (Belgium) Sander Gillé

The following pairs received entry as lucky losers:

- (India) Yuki Bhambri / (United States) Robert Galloway
- (United Kingdom) Dan Evans / (United Kingdom) Henry Searle

=== Withdrawals ===
- (Australia) Alex de Minaur / (Australia) Alexei Popyrin → replaced by (India) Yuki Bhambri / (United States) Robert Galloway
- (Bulgaria) Grigor Dimitrov / (United Kingdom) Jack Draper → replaced by (Monaco) Hugo Nys / (France) Édouard Roger-Vasselin
- (United States) Taylor Fritz / (United States) Tommy Paul → replaced by (United States) Taylor Fritz / (Czech Republic) Jiří Lehečka
- (Spain) Marcel Granollers / (Argentina) Horacio Zeballos → replaced by (United States) Brandon Nakashima / (United States) Frances Tiafoe
- (United States) Sebastian Korda / (Australia) Jordan Thompson → replaced by (United Kingdom) Dan Evans / (United Kingdom) Henry Searle
- (France) Giovanni Mpetshi Perricard / (Italy) Lorenzo Musetti → replaced by (France) Giovanni Mpetshi Perricard / (United States) Rajeev Ram

== WTA singles main draw entrants ==
=== Seeds ===
Country	Player	Rank^{1}	Seed
CHN	Zheng Qinwen	7	1
USA	Madison Keys	8	2
USA	Emma Navarro	9	3
KAZ	Elena Rybakina	11	4
	Diana Shnaider	12	5
CZE	Karolína Muchová	13	6
CZE	Barbora Krejčiková	15	7
USA	Amanda Anisimova	16	8

- ^{1} Rankings are as of 26 May 2024.

=== Other entrants ===
The following players received wildcards into the main draw:

- (United Kingdom) Jodie Burrage
- (United Kingdom) Francesca Jones
- (United Kingdom) Sonay Kartal
- (United Kingdom) Emma Raducanu

The following players received entry using a protected ranking:

- (Czech Republic) Petra Kvitová

The following players received entry from the qualifying draw:

- (Spain) Cristina Bucșa
- (Australia) Maddison Inglis
- (Germany) Tatjana Maria
- (Australia) Ajla Tomljanović
- (United Kingdom) Heather Watson
- Anastasia Zakharova

=== Withdrawals ===
- Anna Kalinskaya → replaced by (United States) McCartney Kessler
- (United States) Jessica Pegula → replaced by (Slovakia) Rebecca Šramková

== WTA doubles main draw entrants ==
=== Seeds ===
Country	Player	Country	Player	Rank^{1}	Seed
UKR	Lyudmyla Kichenok	NZL	Erin Routliffe	14	1
KAZ	Anna Danilina		Diana Shnaider	26	2
AUS	Ellen Perez	CHN	Zhang Shuai	27	3
USA	Asia Muhammad	NED	Demi Schuurs	34	4

- ^{1} Rankings are as of 26 May 2025.

=== Other entrants ===
The following pair received a wildcard into the doubles main draw:

- (United Kingdom) Jodie Burrage / (United Kingdom) Sonay Kartal
