= 2025 Queen's Club Championships – Women's singles =

Women's singles
- 2025 Queen's Club Championships

Final
- Champion: (Germany) Tatjana Maria
- Runner-up: (United States) Amanda Anisimova
- Score: 6–3, 6–4

Details
- Draw: 28 (6 Q / 4 WC)
- Seeds: 8

Events
Singles	men	women
Doubles	men	women
← 1973 ·	Queen's Club Championships	· 2026 →

Tatjana Maria defeated Amanda Anisimova in the final, 6–3, 6–4 to win the women's singles tennis title at the 2025 Queen's Club Championships. At 37 years and 10 months old, Maria became the oldest woman to win a WTA 500 singles title. She was the oldest player to win a title on the WTA Tour since another returning mother, Serena Williams, in 2020 in Auckland (aged 38).

This was the first edition of the women's event held at the Queen's Club since 1973, when Olga Morozova won the title.

== Seeds ==
The top four seeds receive a bye into the second round.

1. (China) Zheng Qinwen (semifinals)
2. (United States) Madison Keys (semifinals)
3. (United States) Emma Navarro (quarterfinals)
4. (Kazakhstan) Elena Rybakina (quarterfinals)
5. Diana Shnaider (quarterfinals)
6. (Czech Republic) Karolína Muchová (second round)
7. (Czech Republic) Barbora Krejčíková (first round)
8. (United States) Amanda Anisimova (final)

== Draw ==
Key

- Q = Qualifier
- WC = Wild card
- LL = Lucky loser
- Alt = Alternate
- ITF = ITF entry
- PR = Protected ranking
- SR = Special ranking
- SE = Special exempt
- JE = Junior exempt
- JR = Junior Accelerator Programme entrant
- CO = College Accelerator Programme entrant
- NG = Next Gen Accelerator Program entrant
- w/o = Walkover
- r = Retired
- d = Defaulted

=== Finals ===
Semifinals
1	(China) Zheng Qinwen	2	6	4
8	(United States) Amanda Anisimova	6	4	6
Q	(Germany) Tatjana Maria	6	7^{7}
2	(United States) Madison Keys	3	6^{3}

Final
8	(United States) Amanda Anisimova	3	4
Q	(Germany) Tatjana Maria	6	6

=== Top half ===
First round
WC	(United Kingdom) F Jones	2	4
(United States) M Kessler	6	6
WC	(United Kingdom) E Raducanu	6	6
Q	(Spain) C Bucșa	1	2
(Slovakia) R Šramková	6	6
7	(Czech Republic) B Krejčíková	4	3
PR	(Czech Republic) P Kvitová	6	4	4
(Brazil) B Haddad Maia	2	6	6
(Australia) D Kasatkina	1	6	3
WC	(United Kingdom) S Kartal	6	3	6
WC	(United Kingdom) J Burrage	6	3	4
8	(United States) A Anisimova	4	6	6

Second round
1	(China) Q Zheng	6	4	7
(United States) M Kessler	3	6	5
WC	(United Kingdom) E Raducanu	6	6
(Slovakia) R Šramková	4	1
3	(United States) E Navarro	1	7^{7}	6
(Brazil) B Haddad Maia	6	6^{4}	3
WC	(United Kingdom) S Kartal	1	3
8	(United States) A Anisimova	6	6

Quarterfinals
1	(China) Q Zheng	6	6
WC	(United Kingdom) E Raducanu	2	4
3	(United States) E Navarro	3	3
8	(United States) A Anisimova	6	6

Semifinals
1	(China) Q Zheng	2	6	4
8	(United States) A Anisimova	6	4	6

=== Bottom half ===
First round
6	(Czech Republic) K Muchová	7^{7}	3	6
Q	(Australia) M Inglis	6^{5}	6	4
(Canada) L Fernandez	6^{4}	2
Q	(Germany) T Maria	7^{7}	6
Q	(United Kingdom) H Watson	6	6
(Kazakhstan) Y Putintseva	4	3
5	D Shnaider	6	6
(Poland) M Fręch	4	1
Q	(Australia) A Tomljanović	6^{4}	6	4
(United Kingdom) K Boulter	7^{7}	1	6
(Croatia) D Vekić	3	3
Q	A Zakharova	6	6

Second round
6	(Czech Republic) K Muchová	7^{7}	5	1
Q	(Germany) T Maria	6^{3}	7	6
Q	(United Kingdom) H Watson	4	2
4	(Kazakhstan) E Rybakina	6	6
5	D Shnaider	2	6	6
(United Kingdom) K Boulter	6	3	2
Q	A Zakharova	3	2
2	(United States) M Keys	6	6

Quarterfinals
Q	(Germany) T Maria	6	7^{7}
4	(Kazakhstan) E Rybakina	4	6^{4}
5	D Shnaider	6	3	4
2	(United States) M Keys	2	6	6

Semifinals
Q	(Germany) T Maria	6	7^{7}
2	(United States) M Keys	3	6^{3}

== Qualifying ==
=== Seeds ===
1. (United States) Alycia Parks (first round)
2. (Australia) Ajla Tomljanović (qualified)
3. (Turkey) Zeynep Sönmez (qualifying competition)
4. (Germany) Tatjana Maria (qualified)
5. (Colombia) Emiliana Arango (first round)
6. Kamilla Rakhimova (first round)
7. (Spain) Cristina Bucșa (qualified)
8. Anastasia Zakharova (qualified)
9. (Japan) Ena Shibahara (first round)
10. (Australia) Priscilla Hon (qualifying competition)
11. (China) Zhang Shuai (qualifying competition)
12. (Australia) Destanee Aiava (first round)

=== Qualifiers ===
1. Anastasia Zakharova
2. (Australia) Ajla Tomljanović
3. (United Kingdom) Heather Watson
4. (Germany) Tatjana Maria
5. (Spain) Cristina Bucșa
6. (Australia) Maddison Inglis

=== Qualifying draw ===
==== First qualifier ====
First round
1	(United States) Alycia Parks	6^{1}	6^{4}
(Canada) Carol Zhao	7^{7}	7^{7}
WC	(United Kingdom) Daniela Piani	5	4
8	Anastasia Zakharova	7	6

Qualifying competition
(Canada) Carol Zhao	3	7^{7}	6^{7}
8	Anastasia Zakharova	6	6^{1}	7^{9}

==== Second qualifier ====
First round
2	(Australia) Ajla Tomljanović	4	6	6
(France) Harmony Tan	6	2	4
WC	(United Kingdom) Brooke Black	3	2
11	(China) Zhang Shuai	6	6

Qualifying competition
2	(Australia) Ajla Tomljanović	5	7^{9}	6
11	(China) Zhang Shuai	7	6^{7}	3

==== Third qualifier ====
First round
3	(Turkey) Zeynep Sönmez	6	6
(Germany) Mina Hodzic	2	2
(United Kingdom) Heather Watson	6	5	6
9	(Japan) Ena Shibahara	1	7	4

Qualifying competition
3	(Turkey) Zeynep Sönmez	0	3
(United Kingdom) Heather Watson	6	6

==== Fourth qualifier ====
First round
4	(Germany) Tatjana Maria	6	6
Alt	(Chinese Taipei) Chan Hao-ching	0	2
(Australia) Arina Rodionova	7^{7}	6
12	(Australia) Destanee Aiava	6^{3}	1

Qualifying competition
4	(Germany) Tatjana Maria	6	6
(Australia) Arina Rodionova	2	2

==== Fifth qualifier ====
First round
5	(Colombia) Emiliana Arango	2	6	4
WC	(United Kingdom) Lily Miyazaki	6	4	6
(United Kingdom) Alice Gillan	1	3
7	(Spain) Cristina Bucșa	6	6

Qualifying competition
WC	(United Kingdom) Lily Miyazaki	6	3	4
7	(Spain) Cristina Bucșa	4	6	6

==== Sixth qualifier ====
First round
6	Kamilla Rakhimova	5	3
(Australia) Maddison Inglis	7	6
WC	(United Kingdom) Mika Stojsavljevic	6^{2}	4
10	(Australia) Priscilla Hon	7^{7}	6

Qualifying competition
(Australia) Maddison Inglis	6	6
10	(Australia) Priscilla Hon	3	1
