= 2014 Sparta Prague Open – Doubles =

Women's tennis tournament

Doubles
- 2014 Sparta Prague Open

Final
- Champions: (Czech Republic) Lucie Hradecká (Netherlands) Michaëlla Krajicek
- Runners-up: (Czech Republic) Andrea Hlaváčková (Czech Republic) Lucie Šafářová
- Score: 6–3, 6–2

Events
Singles	Doubles
← 2013 ·	Sparta Prague Open	· 2015 →

Renata Voráčová and Barbora Záhlavová-Strýcová were the defending champions, having won the event in 2013, but both players chose not to participate.

Lucie Hradecká and Michaëlla Krajicek won the tournament, defeating Andrea Hlaváčková and Lucie Šafářová in the final, 6–3, 6–2.

== Seeds ==
1. (Czech Republic) Andrea Hlaváčková / (Czech Republic) Lucie Šafářová (final)
2. (Czech Republic) Lucie Hradecká / (Netherlands) Michaëlla Krajicek (champions)
3. (Czech Republic) Karolína Plíšková / (Czech Republic) Kristýna Plíšková (semifinals)
4. (Croatia) Petra Martić / (Australia) Olivia Rogowska (first round)

== Draw ==
=== Key ===
- Q = Qualifier
- WC = Wild card
- LL = Lucky loser
- Alt = Alternate
- SE = Special exempt
- PR = Protected ranking
- ITF = ITF entry
- JE = Junior exempt
- w/o = Walkover
- r = Retired
- d = Defaulted
- SR = Special ranking

First round
1	(Czech Republic) A Hlaváčková (Czech Republic) L Šafářová	6	6
(United States) I Falconi (Czech Republic) E Hrdinová	4	3
(Luxembourg) M Minella (Russia) A Panova	6^{6}	5
(Hungary) R-L Jani (Ukraine) V Kapshay	7^{8}	7
4	(Croatia) P Martić (Australia) O Rogowska	2	4
WC	(Czech Republic) B Krejčíková (Czech Republic) K Siniaková	6	6
(United States) M Oudin (Netherlands) A Rus	2	3
(Serbia) A Krunić (Romania) R Olaru	6	6
WC	(Czech Republic) P Krejsová (Czech Republic) T Smitková	6	6
WC	(Czech Republic) S Heinová (Czech Republic) K Roučková	4	2
(Italy) N Clerico (Italy) G Gatto-Monticone	0	4
3	(Czech Republic) Ka Plíšková (Czech Republic) Kr Plíšková	6	6
(Switzerland) V Golubic (Poland) M Linette	3	4
(United States) N Melichar (Serbia) T Mirčić	6	6
(Colombia) M Duque (United Kingdom) H Watson	2	6	[6]
2	(Czech Republic) L Hradecká (Netherlands) M Krajicek	6	3	[10]

Quarterfinals
1	(Czech Republic) A Hlaváčková (Czech Republic) L Šafářová	6	6
(Hungary) R-L Jani (Ukraine) V Kapshay	1	1
WC	(Czech Republic) B Krejčíková (Czech Republic) K Siniaková	6	6
(Serbia) A Krunić (Romania) R Olaru	2	3
WC	(Czech Republic) P Krejsová (Czech Republic) T Smitková	1	5
3	(Czech Republic) Ka Plíšková (Czech Republic) Kr Plíšková	6	7
(United States) N Melichar (Serbia) T Mirčić	2	1
2	(Czech Republic) L Hradecká (Netherlands) M Krajicek	6	6

Semifinals
1	(Czech Republic) A Hlaváčková (Czech Republic) L Šafářová	3	7	[10]
WC	(Czech Republic) B Krejčíková (Czech Republic) K Siniaková	6	5	[1]
3	(Czech Republic) Ka Plíšková (Czech Republic) Kr Plíšková	3	6^{4}
2	(Czech Republic) L Hradecká (Netherlands) M Krajicek	6	7^{7}

Final
1	(Czech Republic) A Hlaváčková (Czech Republic) L Šafářová	3	2
2	(Czech Republic) L Hradecká (Netherlands) M Krajicek	6	6
