= 2025 Queen's Club Championships – Women's doubles =

Women's doubles
- 2025 Queen's Club Championships

Final
- Champions: (United States) Asia Muhammad (Netherlands) Demi Schuurs
- Runners-up: (Kazakhstan) Anna Danilina; Diana Shnaider
- Score: 7–5, 6–7^{(3–7)}, [10–4]

Details
- Draw: 16 (1 WC)
- Seeds: 4

Events
Singles	men	women
Doubles	men	women
← 1973 ·	Queen's Club Championships	· 2026 →

Asia Muhammad and Demi Schuurs defeated Anna Danilina and Diana Shnaider in the final, 7–5, 6–7^{(3–7)}, [10–4] to win the women's doubles tennis title at the 2025 Queen's Club Championships.

This was the first edition of the women's event held at the Queen's Club since 1973, when Rosie Casals and Billie Jean King won the title.

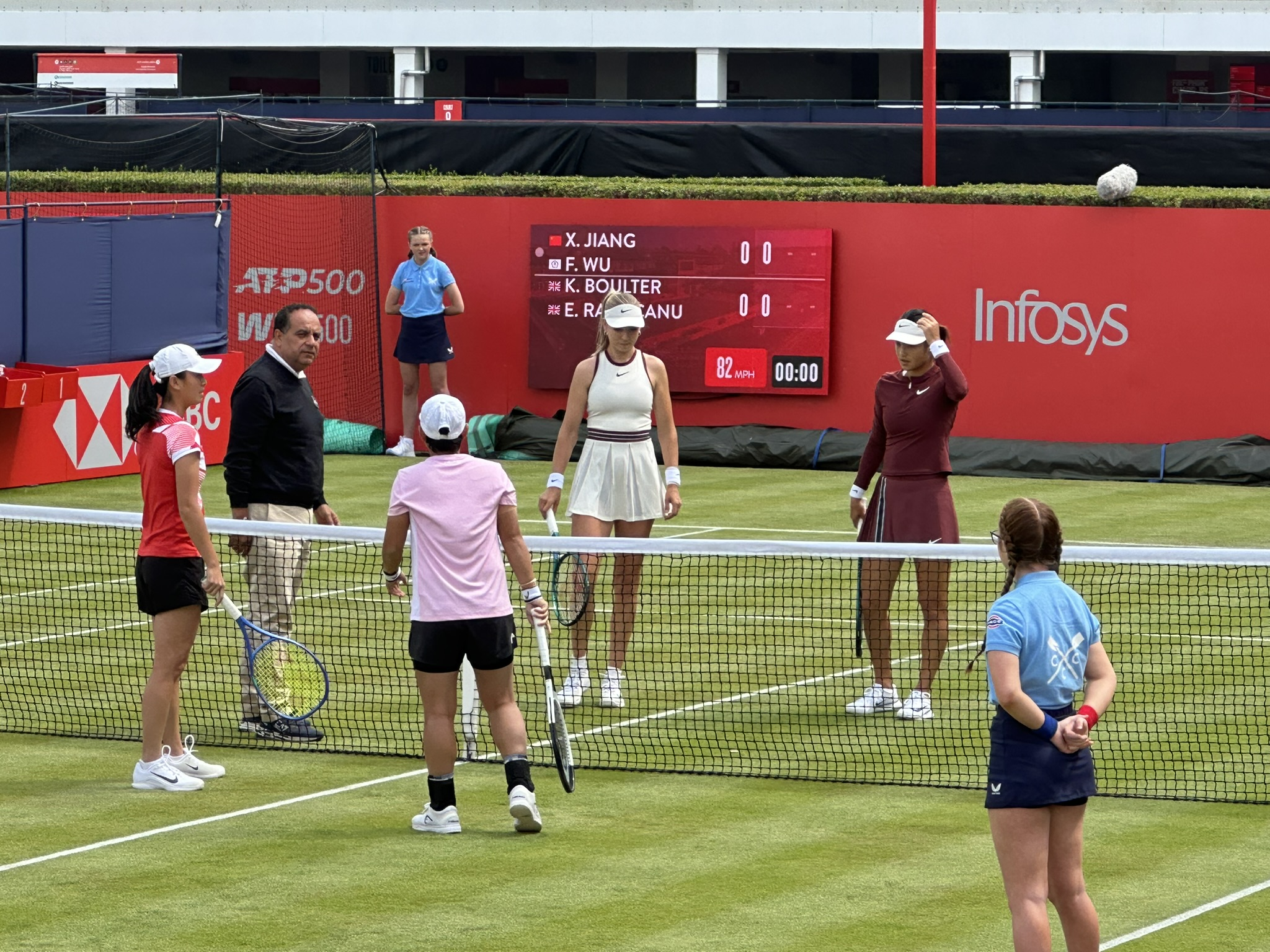
First round match contested by Katie Boulter / Emma Raducanu vs Fang-Hsien Wu / Xinyu Jiang.

== Seeds ==
1. (Ukraine) Lyudmyla Kichenok / (New Zealand) Erin Routliffe (semifinals)
2. (Kazakhstan) Anna Danilina / Diana Shnaider (final)
3. (Australia) Ellen Perez / (China) Zhang Shuai (semifinals)
4. (United States) Asia Muhammad / (Netherlands) Demi Schuurs (champions)

== Draw ==
Key

- Q = Qualifier
- WC = Wild card
- LL = Lucky loser
- Alt = Alternate
- ITF = ITF entry
- PR = Protected ranking
- SR = Special ranking
- SE = Special exempt
- JE = Junior exempt
- JR = Junior Accelerator Programme entrant
- CO = College Accelerator Programme entrant
- NG = Next Gen Accelerator Program entrant
- w/o = Walkover
- r = Retired
- d = Defaulted

=== Draw ===
First round
1	(Ukraine) L Kichenok (New Zealand) E Routliffe	7^{10}	7^{7}
WC	(United Kingdom) J Burrage (United Kingdom) S Kartal	6^{8}	6^{1}
(China) X Jiang (Chinese Taipei) F-h Wu	4	2
(United Kingdom) K Boulter (United Kingdom) E Raducanu	6	6
4	(United States) A Muhammad (Netherlands) D Schuurs	6	6
(China) Y Xu (China) Z Yang	2	3
(Spain) C Bucșa (Brazil) B Haddad Maia	3	7	[6]
(Kazakhstan) Y Putintseva (Kazakhstan) E Rybakina	6	5	[10]
(Hungary) T Babos (Brazil) L Stefani	6	6
(Australia) D Kasatkina (Croatia) D Vekić	3	4
(Slovakia) T Mihalíková (United Kingdom) O Nicholls	6^{3}	6^{5}
3	(Australia) E Perez (China) S Zhang	7^{7}	7^{7}
(Australia) S Hunter (United States) D Krawczyk	6	3	[10]
(Chinese Taipei) H-c Chan (Czech Republic) B Krejčíková	3	6	[4]
(Mexico) G Olmos; A Panova	4	5
2	(Kazakhstan) A Danilina; D Shnaider	6	7

Quarterfinals
1	(Ukraine) L Kichenok (New Zealand) E Routliffe	6	7
(United Kingdom) K Boulter (United Kingdom) E Raducanu	2	5
4	(United States) A Muhammad (Netherlands) D Schuurs	6	7
(Kazakhstan) Y Putintseva (Kazakhstan) E Rybakina	1	5
(Hungary) T Babos (Brazil) L Stefani	6^{4}	6^{7}
3	(Australia) E Perez (China) S Zhang	7^{7}	7^{9}
(Australia) S Hunter (United States) D Krawczyk	6^{6}	4
2	(Kazakhstan) A Danilina; D Shnaider	7^{7}	6

Semifinals
1	(Ukraine) L Kichenok (New Zealand) E Routliffe	1	2
4	(United States) A Muhammad (Netherlands) D Schuurs	6	6
3	(Australia) E Perez (China) S Zhang	3	6	[9]
2	(Kazakhstan) A Danilina; D Shnaider	6	2	[11]

Final
4	(United States) A Muhammad (Netherlands) D Schuurs	7	6^{3}	[10]
2	(Kazakhstan) A Danilina; D Shnaider	5	7^{7}	[4]
