= 2025 Queen's Club Championships – Men's doubles =

Men's doubles
- 2025 Queen's Club Championships

Final
- Champions: (United Kingdom) Julian Cash (United Kingdom) Lloyd Glasspool
- Runners-up: (Croatia) Nikola Mektić (New Zealand) Michael Venus
- Score: 6–3, 6–7^{(5–7)}, [10–6]

Events
Singles	men	women
Doubles	men	women
← 2024 ·	Queen's Club Championships	· 2026 →

Julian Cash and Lloyd Glasspool defeated Nikola Mektić and Michael Venus in the final, 6–3, 6–7^{(5–7)}, [10–6] to win the doubles tennis title at the 2025 Queen's Club Championships. They became the first all-British pairing to win the title in the Open Era.

Neal Skupski and Venus were the defending champions. Skupski partnered Joe Salisbury, but they lost in first round to Jacob Fearnley and Cameron Norrie.

Marcelo Arévalo and Mate Pavić retained the world No. 1 doubles ranking after Harri Heliövaara and Henry Patten lost in the semifinals.

== Seeds ==
1. (El Salvador) Marcelo Arévalo / (Croatia) Mate Pavić (quarterfinals)
2. (Finland) Harri Heliövaara / (United Kingdom) Henry Patten (semifinals)
3. (United Kingdom) Joe Salisbury / (United Kingdom) Neal Skupski (first round)
4. (United Kingdom) Julian Cash / (United Kingdom) Lloyd Glasspool (champions)

== Draw ==
Key

- Q = Qualifier
- WC = Wild card
- LL = Lucky loser
- Alt = Alternate
- ITF = ITF entry
- PR = Protected ranking
- SR = Special ranking
- SE = Special exempt
- JE = Junior exempt
- JR = Junior Accelerator Programme entrant
- CO = College Accelerator Programme entrant
- NG = Next Gen Accelerator Program entrant
- w/o = Walkover
- r = Retired
- d = Defaulted

=== Draw ===
First round
1	(El Salvador) M Arévalo (Croatia) M Pavić	7^{7}	7^{7}
PR	(United States) R Opelka (United States) B Shelton	6^{5}	6^{1}
(Croatia) N Mektić (New Zealand) M Venus	7	6
(United States) B Nakashima (United States) F Tiafoe	5	2
3	(United Kingdom) J Salisbury (United Kingdom) N Skupski	3	6	[11]
WC	(United Kingdom) J Fearnley (United Kingdom) C Norrie	6	3	[13]
(United States) T Fritz (Czech Republic) J Lehečka	4	6	[10]
LL	(India) Y Bhambri (United States) R Galloway	6	1	[8]
(Czech Republic) J Menšík (Denmark) H Rune	6^{1}	7^{7}	[6]
Q	(India) R Bopanna (Belgium) S Gillé	7^{7}	6^{5}	[10]
(France) G Mpetshi Perricard (United States) R Ram	3	4
4	(United Kingdom) J Cash (United Kingdom) L Glasspool	6	6
WC	(United Kingdom) D Stevenson (United Kingdom) M Willis	7^{7}	6^{3}	[10]
(Monaco) H Nys (France) É Roger-Vasselin	6^{5}	7^{7}	[3]
LL	(United Kingdom) D Evans (United Kingdom) H Searle	6^{6}	1
2	(Finland) H Heliövaara (United Kingdom) H Patten	7^{8}	6

Quarterfinals
1	(El Salvador) M Arévalo (Croatia) M Pavić	4	6	[6]
(Croatia) N Mektić (New Zealand) M Venus	6	2	[10]
WC	(United Kingdom) J Fearnley (United Kingdom) C Norrie	6	6
(United States) T Fritz (Czech Republic) J Lehečka	2	4
Q	(India) R Bopanna (Belgium) S Gillé	6^{4}	6^{5}
4	(United Kingdom) J Cash (United Kingdom) L Glasspool	7^{7}	7^{7}
WC	(United Kingdom) D Stevenson (United Kingdom) M Willis	6	3	[6]
2	(Finland) H Heliövaara (United Kingdom) H Patten	2	6	[10]

Semifinals
(Croatia) N Mektić (New Zealand) M Venus	6	7
WC	(United Kingdom) J Fearnley (United Kingdom) C Norrie	3	5
4	(United Kingdom) J Cash (United Kingdom) L Glasspool	7^{7}	3	[10]
2	(Finland) H Heliövaara (United Kingdom) H Patten	6^{3}	6	[6]

Final
(Croatia) N Mektić (New Zealand) M Venus	3	7^{7}	[6]
4	(United Kingdom) J Cash (United Kingdom) L Glasspool	6	6^{5}	[10]

== Qualifying ==
=== Seeds ===
1. (Netherlands) Sander Arends / (United Kingdom) Luke Johnson (first round, retired)
2. (India) Yuki Bhambri / (United States) Robert Galloway (first round, lucky losers)

=== Qualifiers ===
1. (India) Rohan Bopanna / (Belgium) Sander Gillé

=== Lucky losers ===
1. (United Kingdom) Dan Evans / (United Kingdom) Henry Searle
2. (India) Yuki Bhambri / (United States) Robert Galloway

=== Qualifying draw ===
First round
1	(Netherlands) Sander Arends (United Kingdom) Luke Johnson	2	2^{r}
WC	(United Kingdom) Dan Evans (United Kingdom) Henry Searle	6	2
(India) Rohan Bopanna (Belgium) Sander Gillé	6	7^{7}
2	(India) Yuki Bhambri (United States) Robert Galloway	2	6^{4}

Qualifying competition
WC	(United Kingdom) Dan Evans (United Kingdom) Henry Searle	4	5
(India) Rohan Bopanna (Belgium) Sander Gillé	6	7
