= 2026 Queen's Club Championships – Women's singles =

Women's singles
- 2026 Queen's Club Championships

Final
- Champion: (Croatia) Donna Vekić
- Runner-up: (United Kingdom) Emma Raducanu
- Score: 6–0, 7–6^{(8–6)}

Events
Singles	men	women
Doubles	men	women
- Queen's Club Championships

Donna Vekić defeated Emma Raducanu in the final, 6–0, 7–6^{(8–6)}, to win the women's singles tennis title at the 2026 Queen's Club Championships. It was her first WTA 500 title and fifth WTA Tour title overall. Vekić was the seventh lucky loser overall to win a WTA Tour title, and the first since 2023.

Tatjana Maria was the defending champion, but lost in the second round to Elena Rybakina, in a rematch of the previous year's quarterfinal match.

== Seeds ==
The top four seeds received a bye into the second round.

1. (Kazakhstan) Elena Rybakina (quarterfinals)
2. (United States) Amanda Anisimova (quarterfinals)
3. (Canada) Victoria Mboko (second round, retired)
4. (Switzerland) Belinda Bencic (withdrew)
5. (Ukraine) Marta Kostyuk (withdrew)
6. (United States) Iva Jovic (semifinals)
7. (Romania) Sorana Cîrstea (second round)
8. (Canada) Leylah Fernandez (first round)

== Draw ==
Key

- Q = Qualifier
- WC = Wild card
- LL = Lucky loser
- Alt = Alternate
- ITF = ITF entry
- PR = Protected ranking
- SR = Special ranking
- SE = Special exempt
- JE = Junior exempt
- JR = Junior Accelerator Programme entrant
- CO = College Accelerator Programme entrant
- NG = Next Gen Accelerator Program entrant
- w/o = Walkover
- r = Retired
- d = Defaulted

=== Finals ===
Semifinals
WC	(United Kingdom) Katie Boulter	1	3
LL	(Croatia) Donna Vekić	6	6
(United Kingdom) Emma Raducanu	6	6
6	(United States) Iva Jovic	2	2

Final
LL	(Croatia) Donna Vekić	6	7^{8}
(United Kingdom) Emma Raducanu	0	6^{6}

=== Top half ===
First round
(Greece) M Sakkari	3	3
Q	(Germany) T Maria	6	6
(China) Q Zheng	4	6^{4}
(Romania) J Cristian	6	7^{7}
WC	(United Kingdom) K Boulter	3	7^{7}	7
8	(Canada) L Fernandez	6	6^{4}	5
PR	(Czech Republic) Ka Plíšková	6^{1}	6	6
(United States) M Kessler	7^{7}	3	4
(Czech Republic) M Bouzková	6	6
Q	(Uzbekistan) P Kudermetova	0	3
WC	(United Kingdom) M Stojsavljevic	2	3
LL	(Croatia) D Vekić	6	6

Second round
1	(Kazakhstan) E Rybakina	6^{4}	7	6
Q	(Germany) T Maria	7^{7}	5	0
(Romania) J Cristian	1	3
WC	(United Kingdom) K Boulter	6	6
3	(Canada) V Mboko	2	4^{r}
PR	(Czech Republic) Ka Plíšková	6	3
(Czech Republic) M Bouzková	6^{9}	3
LL	(Croatia) D Vekić	7^{11}	6

Quarterfinals
1	(Kazakhstan) E Rybakina	5	6	4
WC	(United Kingdom) K Boulter	7	2	6
PR	(Czech Republic) Ka Plíšková	4	6	3
LL	(Croatia) D Vekić	6	4	6

Semifinals
WC	(United Kingdom) K Boulter	1	3
LL	(Croatia) D Vekić	6	6

=== Bottom half ===
First round
7	(Romania) S Cîrstea	6	5	6
Q	(Australia) M Inglis	4	7	2
(United Kingdom) E Raducanu	6	6
Q	A Blinkova	0	3
WC	(United Kingdom) H Dart	5	6	6
L Samsonova	7	4	3
6	(United States) I Jovic	6	6
Q	(Croatia) A Ružić	3	4
Q	(China) S Zhang	3	2
(Philippines) A Eala	6	6
(Germany) L Siegemund	6	6
WC	(United Kingdom) F Jones	2	3

Second round
7	(Romania) S Cîrstea	4	2
(United Kingdom) E Raducanu	6	6
WC	(United Kingdom) H Dart	7	1	5
LL	(Uzbekistan) K Rakhimova	5	6	7
6	(United States) I Jovic	6	6
(Philippines) A Eala	2	2
(Germany) L Siegemund	1	3
2	(United States) A Anisimova	6	6

Quarterfinals
(United Kingdom) E Raducanu	6	7
LL	(Uzbekistan) K Rakhimova	3	5
6	(United States) I Jovic	6	3	6
2	(United States) A Anisimova	2	6	3

Semifinals
(United Kingdom) E Raducanu	6	6
6	(United States) I Jovic	2	2

== Qualifying ==
=== Seeds ===
1. (Germany) Tatjana Maria (qualified)
2. (Australia) Talia Gibson (first round)
3. (China) Zhang Shuai (qualified)
4. (Croatia) Antonia Ružić (qualified)
5. (France) Elsa Jacquemot (first round)
6. (Croatia) Donna Vekić (qualifying competition, lucky loser)
7. (United States) Alycia Parks (first round)
8. (Uzbekistan) Kamilla Rakhimova (qualifying competition, lucky loser)
9. Anna Blinkova (qualified)
10. (Brazil) Beatriz Haddad Maia (first round)
11. (Uzbekistan) Polina Kudermetova (qualified)
12. Aliaksandra Sasnovich (first round)

=== Qualifiers ===
1. (Germany) Tatjana Maria
2. (Uzbekistan) Polina Kudermetova
3. (China) Zhang Shuai
4. (Croatia) Antonia Ružić
5. (Australia) Maddison Inglis
6. Anna Blinkova

=== Lucky loser ===
1. (Croatia) Donna Vekić
2. (Uzbekistan) Kamilla Rakhimova

=== Qualifying draw ===
==== First qualifier ====
First round
1	(Germany) Tatjana Maria	6	1	6
WC	(United Kingdom) Lily Miyazaki	2	6	2
(Georgia (country)) Ekaterine Gorgodze	2	3
8	(Uzbekistan) Kamilla Rakhimova	6	6

Qualifying competition
1	(Germany) Tatjana Maria	6	6
8	(Uzbekistan) Kamilla Rakhimova	4	3

==== Second qualifier ====
First round
2	(Australia) Talia Gibson	2	6^{6}
Alina Charaeva	6	7^{8}
(Australia) Priscilla Hon	6	4	3
11	(Uzbekistan) Polina Kudermetova	4	6	6

Qualifying competition
Alina Charaeva	3	6	4
11	(Uzbekistan) Polina Kudermetova	6	4	6

==== Third qualifier ====
First round
3	(China) Zhang Shuai	6	4	6
WC	(United Kingdom) Hannah Klugman	2	6	4
WC	(United Kingdom) Heather Watson	7	6
10	(Brazil) Beatriz Haddad Maia	5	0

Qualifying competition
3	(China) Zhang Shuai	6	6
WC	(United Kingdom) Heather Watson	3	4

==== Fourth qualifier ====
First round
4	(Croatia) Antonia Ružić	6	6
PR	(Japan) Aoi Ito	3	4
(Australia) Storm Hunter	5	7^{9}	7^{7}
12	Aliaksandra Sasnovich	7	6^{7}	6^{4}

Qualifying competition
4	(Croatia) Antonia Ružić	6	4	7
(Australia) Storm Hunter	3	6	5

==== Fifth qualifier ====
First round
5	(France) Elsa Jacquemot	2	6	4
(China) Guo Hanyu	6	4	6
(Australia) Maddison Inglis	5	6	6
7	(United States) Alycia Parks	7	4	4

Qualifying competition
(China) Guo Hanyu	3	6	2
(Australia) Maddison Inglis	6	2	6

==== Sixth qualifier ====
First round
6	(Croatia) Donna Vekić	6	6
(France) Carole Monnet	3	4
WC	(United Kingdom) Jodie Burrage	1	3
9	Anna Blinkova	6	6

Qualifying competition
6	(Croatia) Donna Vekić	2	4
9	Anna Blinkova	6	6
