= 2026 Queen's Club Championships – Women's doubles =

Women's doubles
- 2026 Queen's Club Championships

Final
- Champions: (Slovakia) Tereza Mihalíková (United Kingdom) Olivia Nicholls
- Runners-up: (Canada) Leylah Fernandez (Germany) Laura Siegemund
- Score: 6–3, 6–7^{(4–7)}, [10–5]

Events
| Singles | men | women |
| Doubles | men | women |
- Queen's Club Championships

Tereza Mihalíková and Olivia Nicholls defeated Leylah Fernandez and Laura Siegemund in the final, 6–3, 6–7^{(4–7)}, [10–5] to win the women's doubles tennis title at the 2026 Queen's Club Championships. In the semifinals they saved three match points.

Asia Muhammad and Demi Schuurs were the defending champions, but chose to compete with different partners. Muhammad partnered Fanny Stollár, but lost in the first round to Guo Hanyu and Kristina Mladenovic. Schuurs partnered Alexandra Panova, but lost in the first round to Fernandez and Siegemund.

The event marked the return of 23-time singles and 14-time doubles major champion and former singles and doubles world No. 1, Serena Williams, who previously retired at the 2022 US Open. She won her first match with partner Victoria Mboko, but the pair withdrew from the quarterfinals due to a knee injury by Mboko.

== Seeds ==
1. (Kazakhstan) Anna Danilina / (Serbia) Aleksandra Krunić (quarterfinals)
2. (Canada) Gabriela Dabrowski / (Brazil) Luisa Stefani (quarterfinals)
3. (United States) Nicole Melichar-Martinez / (Australia) Erin Routliffe (first round)
4. (Australia) Storm Hunter / (China) Zhang Shuai (quarterfinals)

== Draw ==
Key

- Q = Qualifier
- WC = Wild card
- LL = Lucky loser
- Alt = Alternate
- ITF = ITF entry
- PR = Protected ranking
- SR = Special ranking
- SE = Special exempt
- JE = Junior exempt
- JR = Junior Accelerator Programme entrant
- CO = College Accelerator Programme entrant
- NG = Next Gen Accelerator Program entrant
- w/o = Walkover
- r = Retired
- d = Defaulted

=== Draw ===
First round
1 | (Kazakhstan) A Danilina (Serbia) A Krunić | 6 | 6
(Norway) U Eikeri (United States) Q Gleason | 2 | 4
PR | (Croatia) D Jurak Schreiber (Poland) A Rosolska | 7 | 0 | [7]
(Slovakia) T Mihalíková (United Kingdom) O Nicholls | 5 | 6 | [10]
4 | (Australia) S Hunter (China) S Zhang | 6 | 3 | [10]
WC | (United Kingdom) K Boulter (United Kingdom) E Raducanu | 4 | 6 | [5]
(China) H Guo (France) K Mladenovic | 6 | 6
(United States) A Muhammad (Hungary) F Stollár | 4 | 4
(Canada) L Fernandez (Germany) L Siegemund | 6 | 2 | [11]
A Panova (Netherlands) D Schuurs | 2 | 6 | [9]
WC | (Canada) V Mboko (United States) S Williams | 7^{7} | 6
3 | (United States) N Melichar-Martinez (New Zealand) E Routliffe | 6^{2} | 2
(United States) I Jovic (United States) M Kessler | 6 | 6
(Ukraine) L Kichenok (United States) D Krawczyk | 1 | 4
(Japan) M Kato; L Samsonova | 3 | 2
2 | (Canada) G Dabrowski (Brazil) L Stefani | 6 | 6

Quarterfinals
1 | (Kazakhstan) A Danilina (Serbia) A Krunić | 4 | 4
(Slovakia) T Mihalíková (United Kingdom) O Nicholls | 6 | 6
4 | (Australia) S Hunter (China) S Zhang | 3 | 1
(China) H Guo (France) K Mladenovic | 6 | 6
(Canada) L Fernandez (Germany) L Siegemund | w/o
WC | (Canada) V Mboko (United States) S Williams
(United States) I Jovic (United States) M Kessler | 6 | 6^{5} | [10]
2 | (Canada) G Dabrowski (Brazil) L Stefani | 3 | 7^{7} | [7]

Semifinals
(Slovakia) T Mihalíková (United Kingdom) O Nicholls | 4 | 7 | [12]
(China) H Guo (France) K Mladenovic | 6 | 5 | [10]
(Canada) L Fernandez (Germany) L Siegemund | w/o
(United States) I Jovic (United States) M Kessler

Final
(Slovakia) T Mihalíková (United Kingdom) O Nicholls | 6 | 6^{4} | [10]
(Canada) L Fernandez (Germany) L Siegemund | 3 | 7^{7} | [5]
