= 2013 Sparta Prague Open =

- Date: 13–19 May
- Edition: 4th
- Location: Prague, Czech Republic
- Venue: TK Sparta Prague

Champions

Singles
- (Czech Republic) Lucie Šafářová

Doubles
- (Czech Republic) Renata Voráčová / (Czech Republic) Barbora Záhlavová-Strýcová
- Sparta Prague Open

The 2013 Sparta Prague Open was a professional tennis tournament played on outdoor clay courts. It was the fourth edition of the tournament which was part of the 2013 ITF Women's Circuit, offering a total of $100,000 in prize money. It took place in Prague, Czech Republic, from 13 to 19 May 2013.

== WTA entrants ==
=== Seeds ===
Country	Player	Rank^{1}	Seed
CZE	Klára Zakopalová	20	1
CZE	Lucie Šafářová	25	2
CZE	Lucie Hradecká	57	3
GER	Annika Beck	59	4
SWE	Johanna Larsson	66	5
SVK	Jana Čepelová	83	6
PUR	Monica Puig	88	7
JPN	Misaki Doi	90	8

- ^{1} Rankings as of 6 May 2013

=== Other entrants ===
The following players received wildcards into the singles main draw:

- (Czech Republic) Lucie Hradecká
- (Slovakia) Anna Karolína Schmiedlová
- (Czech Republic) Kateřina Siniaková
- (Czech Republic) Tereza Smitková

The following players received entry from the qualifying draw:

- (Canada) Gabriela Dabrowski
- (United States) Bernarda Pera
- (Croatia) Ana Vrljić
- (Czech Republic) Sandra Záhlavová

The following player received entry by a Special Exempt:

- (Czech Republic) Barbora Záhlavová-Strýcová

== Champions ==
=== Singles ===
- (Czech Republic) Lucie Šafářová def. (Romania) Alexandra Cadanțu 3–6, 6–1, 6–1

=== Doubles ===
- (Czech Republic) Renata Voráčová / (Czech Republic) Barbora Záhlavová-Strýcová def. (United States) Irina Falconi / (Czech Republic) Eva Hrdinová 6–4, 6–0
