= 2014 Sparta Prague Open – Singles =

Singles
- 2014 Sparta Prague Open

Final
- Champion: (United Kingdom) Heather Watson
- Runner-up: (Slovakia) Anna Karolína Schmiedlová
- Score: 7–6^{(7–5)}, 6–0

Details
- Draw: 32
- Seeds: 8

Events
Singles	Doubles
- Sparta Prague Open

Lucie Šafářová was the defending champion, but lost in the first round to qualifier Ekaterina Alexandrova.

Heather Watson won the tournament, defeating Anna Karolína Schmiedlová in the final, 7–6^{(7–5)}, 6–0.

== Seeds ==
1. (Czech Republic) Lucie Šafářová (first round)
2. (Czech Republic) Klára Koukalová (first round)
3. (Czech Republic) Barbora Záhlavová-Strýcová (first round)
4. (Belgium) Yanina Wickmayer (first round)
5. (Czech Republic) Karolína Plíšková (quarterfinals)
6. (Slovakia) Anna Karolína Schmiedlová (final)
7. (Germany) Dinah Pfizenmaier (second round)
8. (Japan) Misaki Doi (quarterfinals)

== Main draw ==
Key

- Q = Qualifier
- WC = Wild card
- LL = Lucky loser
- Alt = Alternate
- ITF = ITF entry
- PR = Protected ranking
- SR = Special ranking
- SE = Special exempt
- JE = Junior exempt
- JR = Junior Accelerator Programme entrant
- CO = College Accelerator Programme entrant
- NG = Next Gen Accelerator Program entrant
- w/o = Walkover
- r = Retired
- d = Defaulted

=== Finals ===
Semifinals
6	(Slovakia) Anna Karolína Schmiedlová	7^{8}	1	6
SE	(Serbia) Aleksandra Krunić	6^{6}	6	3
(Hungary) Tímea Babos	6^{3}	3
(United Kingdom) Heather Watson	7^{7}	6

Final
6	(Slovakia) Anna Karolína Schmiedlová	6^{5}	0
(United Kingdom) Heather Watson	7^{7}	6

=== Top half ===
First round
1	(Czech Republic) L Šafářová	4	4
Q	(Russia) E Alexandrova	6	6
WC	(Czech Republic) S Heinová	5	6	3
(United States) M Oudin	7	4	6
(Colombia) M Duque	3	6	6
(Belarus) O Govortsova	6	3	2
(Czech Republic) A Hlaváčková	3	6	2
6	(Slovakia) AK Schmiedlová	6	4	6
4	(Belgium) Y Wickmayer	4	3
Q	(United States) M Brengle	6	6
WC	(Czech Republic) K Siniaková	2	4
SE	(Serbia) A Krunić	6	6
(Russia) A Panova	6^{5}	6	7^{12}
(Croatia) P Martić	7^{7}	4	6^{10}
(Germany) A-L Friedsam	6	6^{2}	3
8	(Japan) M Doi	3	7^{7}	6

Second round
Q	(Russia) E Alexandrova	6	5	4
(United States) M Oudin	2	7	6
(Colombia) M Duque	4	5
6	(Slovakia) AK Schmiedlová	6	7
Q	(United States) M Brengle	2	6	2
SE	(Serbia) A Krunić	6	1	6
(Russia) A Panova	3	0
8	(Japan) M Doi	6	6

Quarterfinals
(United States) M Oudin	6	4	1^{r}
6	(Slovakia) AK Schmiedlová	4	6	3
SE	(Serbia) A Krunić	6	7
8	(Japan) M Doi	4	5

Semifinals
6	(Slovakia) AK Schmiedlová	7^{8}	1	6
SE	(Serbia) A Krunić	6^{6}	6	3

=== Bottom half ===
First round
7	(Germany) D Pfizenmaier	7^{7}	0
Q	(Russia) K Pervak	6^{2}	0^{r}
(Australia) O Rogowska	4	5
WC	(Czech Republic) T Smitková	6	7
(Spain) S Soler Espinosa	6^{1}	2
(Hungary) T Babos	7^{7}	6
Q	(United States) V Duval	6	2	6
3	(Czech Republic) B Záhlavová-Strýcová	4	6	4
5	(Czech Republic) Ka Plíšková	6	0	7
(Luxembourg) M Minella	2	6	5
(Poland) M Linette	6	6
(Czech Republic) Kr Plíšková	1	3
(Belgium) A Van Uytvanck	4	5
WC	(Slovakia) P Uberalová	6	7
(United Kingdom) H Watson	6	6
2	(Czech Republic) K Koukalová	2	4

Second round
7	(Germany) D Pfizenmaier	1	6	3
WC	(Czech Republic) T Smitková	6	4	6
(Hungary) T Babos	6	6
Q	(United States) V Duval	2	3
5	(Czech Republic) Ka Plíšková	6	6
(Poland) M Linette	3	3
WC	(Slovakia) P Uberalová	1	4
(United Kingdom) H Watson	6	6

Quarterfinals
WC	(Czech Republic) T Smitková	2	4
(Hungary) T Babos	6	6
5	(Czech Republic) Ka Plíšková	2	4
(United Kingdom) H Watson	6	6

Semifinals
(Hungary) T Babos	6^{3}	3
(United Kingdom) H Watson	7^{7}	6
