= 2026 Queen's Club Championships – Men's doubles =

Men's doubles
- 2026 Queen's Club Championships

Final
- Champions: (El Salvador) Marcelo Arévalo (Croatia) Mate Pavić
- Runners-up: (Finland) Harri Heliövaara (United Kingdom) Henry Patten
- Score: 6–2, 6–4

Events
Singles	men	women
Doubles	men	women
- Queen's Club Championships

Marcelo Arévalo and Mate Pavić defeated Harri Heliövaara and Henry Patten in the final, 6–2, 6–4 to win the men's doubles tennis title at the 2026 Queen's Club Championships.

Julian Cash and Lloyd Glasspool were the defending champions, but lost in the semifinals to Arévalo and Pavić.

== Seeds ==
1. (Finland) Harri Heliövaara / (United Kingdom) Henry Patten (final)
2. (United Kingdom) Julian Cash / (United Kingdom) Lloyd Glasspool (semifinals)
3. (United States) Christian Harrison / (United Kingdom) Neal Skupski (semifinals)
4. (El Salvador) Marcelo Arévalo / (Croatia) Mate Pavić (champions)

== Draw ==
Key

- Q = Qualifier
- WC = Wild card
- LL = Lucky loser
- Alt = Alternate
- ITF = ITF entry
- PR = Protected ranking
- SR = Special ranking
- SE = Special exempt
- JE = Junior exempt
- JR = Junior Accelerator Programme entrant
- CO = College Accelerator Programme entrant
- NG = Next Gen Accelerator Program entrant
- w/o = Walkover
- r = Retired
- d = Defaulted

=== Draw ===
First round
1	(Finland) H Heliövaara (United Kingdom) H Patten	6	6
(Argentina) G Andreozzi (France) M Guinard	3	3
WC	(United Kingdom) D Stevenson (United Kingdom) M Willis	6	7^{7}
(Monaco) H Nys (France) É Roger-Vasselin	4	6^{3}
3	(United States) C Harrison (United Kingdom) N Skupski	7	6
(United States) A Krajicek (Croatia) N Mektić	5	3
(Czech Republic) J Lehečka (Czech Republic) J Menšík	6	3	[10]
WC	(United Kingdom) L Johnson (Poland) J Zieliński	3	6	[12]
(Australia) A de Minaur (United Kingdom) C Norrie	4	5
PR	(India) Y Bhambri (New Zealand) M Venus	6	7
(United States) R Ram (United Kingdom) J Salisbury	6^{3}	1
4	(El Salvador) M Arévalo (Croatia) M Pavić	7^{7}	6
Q	(Germany) C Frantzen (Netherlands) R Haase	3	7	[10]
(Spain) A Davidovich Fokina (France) A Rinderknech	6	5	[8]
(Argentina) F Cerúndolo (United States) B Nakashima	5	4
2	(United Kingdom) J Cash (United Kingdom) L Glasspool	7	6

Quarterfinals
1	(Finland) H Heliövaara (United Kingdom) H Patten	4	6	[10]
WC	(United Kingdom) D Stevenson (United Kingdom) M Willis	6	3	[4]
3	(United States) C Harrison (United Kingdom) N Skupski	6	6
WC	(United Kingdom) L Johnson (Poland) J Zieliński	4	4
PR	(India) Y Bhambri (New Zealand) M Venus	4	5
4	(El Salvador) M Arévalo (Croatia) M Pavić	6	7
Q	(Germany) C Frantzen (Netherlands) R Haase	3	6	[7]
2	(United Kingdom) J Cash (United Kingdom) L Glasspool	6	1	[10]

Semifinals
1	(Finland) H Heliövaara (United Kingdom) H Patten	6	3	[10]
3	(United States) C Harrison (United Kingdom) N Skupski	4	6	[3]
4	(El Salvador) M Arévalo (Croatia) M Pavić	6	6
2	(United Kingdom) J Cash (United Kingdom) L Glasspool	4	3

Final
1	(Finland) H Heliövaara (United Kingdom) H Patten	2	4
4	(El Salvador) M Arévalo (Croatia) M Pavić	6	6

== Qualifying ==
=== Seeds ===
1. (Germany) Constantin Frantzen / (Netherlands) Robin Haase (qualified)
2. (Sweden) André Göransson / (United States) Evan King (qualifying competition)

=== Qualifiers ===
1. (Germany) Constantin Frantzen / (Netherlands) Robin Haase

=== Qualifying draw ===
First round
1	(Germany) Constantin Frantzen (Netherlands) Robin Haase	7^{8}	6
WC	(United Kingdom) Ben Jones (United Kingdom) Joshua Paris	6^{6}	4
(Australia) Rinky Hijikata (United States) Tommy Paul	4	4
2	(Sweden) André Göransson (United States) Evan King	6	6

Qualifying competition
1	(Germany) Constantin Frantzen (Netherlands) Robin Haase	4	7^{7}	[10]
2	(Sweden) André Göransson (United States) Evan King	6	6^{5}	[8]
