= 2026 Queen's Club Championships – Men's singles =

Men's singles
- 2026 Queen's Club Championships

Final
- Champion: (Argentina) Francisco Cerúndolo
- Runner-up: (United States) Tommy Paul
- Score: 6–7^{(4–7)}, 6–4, 6–3

Details
- Draw: 32 (4Q / 3WC)
- Seeds: 8

Events
Singles	men	women
Doubles	men	women
- Queen's Club Championships

Francisco Cerúndolo defeated Tommy Paul in the final, 6–7^{(4–7)}, 6–4, 6–3 to win the men's singles tennis title at the 2026 Queen's Club Championships. It was his fifth ATP Tour title and first ATP 500 title.

Carlos Alcaraz was the reigning champion, but did not participate this year due to a wrist injury.

== Seeds ==
1. (Australia) Alex de Minaur (quarterfinals)
2. (Czech Republic) Jiří Lehečka (second round)
3. (Czech Republic) Jakub Menšík (first round)
4. (Spain) Alejandro Davidovich Fokina (quarterfinals)
5. (Spain) Rafael Jódar (withdrew)
6. (France) Arthur Rinderknech (first round)
7. (Argentina) Francisco Cerúndolo (champion)
8. (United States) Tommy Paul (final)

== Draw ==
Key

- Q = Qualifier
- WC = Wild card
- LL = Lucky loser
- Alt = Alternate
- ITF = ITF entry
- PR = Protected ranking
- SR = Special ranking
- SE = Special exempt
- JE = Junior exempt
- JR = Junior Accelerator Programme entrant
- CO = College Accelerator Programme entrant
- NG = Next Gen Accelerator Program entrant
- w/o = Walkover
- r = Retired
- d = Defaulted

=== Finals ===
Semifinals
(United States) Brandon Nakashima	7^{7}	3	4
7	(Argentina) Francisco Cerúndolo	6^{5}	6	6
8	(United States) Tommy Paul	6	6
(France) Ugo Humbert	3	3

Final
7	(Argentina) Francisco Cerúndolo	6^{4}	6	6
8	(United States) Tommy Paul	7^{7}	4	3

=== Top half ===
First round
1	(Australia) A de Minaur	7^{10}	6
(Canada) G Diallo	6^{8}	3
WC	(United Kingdom) J Pinnington Jones	4	6	6^{3}
(Canada) D Shapovalov	6	4	7^{7}
(United States) B Nakashima	6	6
(Hungary) M Fucsovics	3	3
(Peru) I Buse	3	7	7^{10}
LL	(United States) M Giron	6	5	6^{8}
3	(Czech Republic) J Menšík	7	6^{3}	6^{5}
(France) A Mannarino	5	7^{7}	7^{7}
WC	(United Kingdom) A Fery	6	6
WC	(United Kingdom) T Samuel	0	2
(United States) J Brooksby	6	3	6
Q	(United States) M Damm	4	6	3
LL	(United States) A Kovacevic	4	7^{7}	2
7	(Argentina) F Cerúndolo	6	6^{5}	6

Second round
1	(Australia) A de Minaur	6	6
(Canada) D Shapovalov	4	1
(United States) B Nakashima	6	6
(Peru) I Buse	2	2
(France) A Mannarino	6^{7}	4
WC	(United Kingdom) A Fery	7^{9}	6
(United States) J Brooksby	0	4
7	(Argentina) F Cerúndolo	6	6

Quarterfinals
1	(Australia) A de Minaur	5	3
(United States) B Nakashima	7	6
WC	(United Kingdom) A Fery	6^{1}	6	4
7	(Argentina) F Cerúndolo	7^{7}	3	6

Semifinals
(United States) B Nakashima	7^{7}	3	4
7	(Argentina) F Cerúndolo	6^{5}	6	6

=== Bottom half ===
First round
8	(United States) T Paul	7	6
LL	(United States) Z Svajda	5	3
(Netherlands) B van de Zandschulp	6	7^{7}
Q	(United Kingdom) H Wendelken	4	6^{5}
Q	(France) G Mpetshi Perricard	7^{7}	4	6^{5}
(France) C Moutet	6^{5}	6	7^{7}
(United Kingdom) C Norrie	6^{6}	2
4	(Spain) A Davidovich Fokina	7^{8}	6
6	(France) A Rinderknech	6^{5}	6^{4}
(Serbia) H Medjedovic	7^{7}	7^{7}
(France) U Humbert	7	6
(Croatia) M Čilić	5	3
Q	(Australia) R Hijikata	6	6
(Chile) A Tabilo	2	4
SE	(Poland) K Majchrzak	5	6^{4}
2	(Czech Republic) J Lehečka	7	7^{7}

Second round
8	(United States) T Paul	7^{7}	6
(Netherlands) B van de Zandschulp	6^{5}	3
(France) C Moutet	4	3
4	(Spain) A Davidovich Fokina	6	6
(Serbia) H Medjedovic	6	6^{4}	6^{5}
(France) U Humbert	2	7^{7}	7^{7}
Q	(Australia) R Hijikata	4	7	7^{9}
2	(Czech Republic) J Lehečka	6	5	6^{7}

Quarterfinals
8	(United States) T Paul	6	7^{7}
4	(Spain) A Davidovich Fokina	3	6^{4}
(France) U Humbert	6	6
Q	(Australia) R Hijikata	1	2

Semifinals
8	(United States) T Paul	6	6
(France) U Humbert	3	3

== Qualifying ==
=== Seeds ===
1. (United States) Zachary Svajda (qualifying competition, lucky loser)
2. (United States) Aleksandar Kovacevic (qualifying competition, lucky loser)
3. (Croatia) Dino Prižmić (first round)
4. (Australia) James Duckworth (first round)
5. (Spain) Daniel Mérida (first round)
6. (United States) Marcos Giron (qualifying competition, lucky loser)
7. (Australia) Adam Walton (first round)
8. (France) Giovanni Mpetshi Perricard (qualified)

=== Qualifiers ===
1. (United States) Martin Damm
2. (France) Giovanni Mpetshi Perricard
3. (Australia) Rinky Hijikata
4. (United Kingdom) Harry Wendelken

=== Lucky losers ===
1. (United States) Zachary Svajda
2. (United States) Aleksandar Kovacevic
3. (United States) Marcos Giron

=== Qualifying draw ===
==== First qualifier ====
First round
1	(United States) Zachary Svajda	7	6
WC	(United Kingdom) Liam Broady	5	2
(United States) Martin Damm	6	6
5	(Spain) Daniel Mérida	3	2

Qualifying competition
1	(United States) Zachary Svajda	3	6^{2}
(United States) Martin Damm	6	7^{7}

==== Second qualifier ====
First round
2	(United States) Aleksandar Kovacevic	7^{7}	6
Alt	(United States) Michael Mmoh	6^{4}	4
WC	(United Kingdom) Johannus Monday	4	3
8	(France) Giovanni Mpetshi Perricard	6	6

Qualifying competition
2	(United States) Aleksandar Kovacevic	3	4
8	(France) Giovanni Mpetshi Perricard	6	6

==== Third qualifier ====
First round
3	(Croatia) Dino Prižmić	6	4	5
(Australia) Rinky Hijikata	4	6	7
(United Kingdom) Dan Evans	5	6	1
6	(United States) Marcos Giron	7	2	6

Qualifying competition
(Australia) Rinky Hijikata	7	6^{4}	6
6	(United States) Marcos Giron	5	7^{7}	1

==== Fourth qualifier ====
First round
4	(Australia) James Duckworth	3	2
Alt	(Australia) Aleksandar Vukic	6	6
WC	(United Kingdom) Harry Wendelken	6	6^{5}	6
7	(Australia) Adam Walton	3	7^{7}	3

Qualifying competition
Alt	(Australia) Aleksandar Vukic	6^{7}	1
WC	(United Kingdom) Harry Wendelken	7^{9}	6
