= 2013 Sparta Prague Open – Doubles =

Doubles
- 2013 Sparta Prague Open

Final
- Champions: (Czech Republic) Renata Voráčová (Czech Republic) Barbora Záhlavová-Strýcová
- Runners-up: (United States) Irina Falconi (Czech Republic) Eva Hrdinová
- Score: 6–4, 6–0

Events
Singles	Doubles
← 2012 ·	Sparta Prague Open	· 2014 →

Alizé Cornet and Virginie Razzano were the defending champions, having won the event in 2012, but both players decided not to defend their title.

Renata Voráčová and Barbora Záhlavová-Strýcová won the title, defeating Irina Falconi and Eva Hrdinová in the final, 6–4, 6–0.

== Seeds ==
1. (Czech Republic) Renata Voráčová / (Czech Republic) Barbora Záhlavová-Strýcová (champions)
2. (United States) Irina Falconi / (Czech Republic) Eva Hrdinová (final)
3. (Uzbekistan) Akgul Amanmuradova / (Greece) Eleni Daniilidou (quarterfinals)
4. (United States) Jill Craybas / (Serbia) Vesna Dolonc (semifinals)

== Draw ==
=== Key ===
- Q = Qualifier
- WC = Wild card
- LL = Lucky loser
- Alt = Alternate
- SE = Special exempt
- PR = Protected ranking
- ITF = ITF entry
- JE = Junior exempt
- w/o = Walkover
- r = Retired
- d = Defaulted
- SR = Special ranking

First round
1	(Czech Republic) R Voráčová (Czech Republic) B Záhlavová-Strýcová	6	4	[10]
WC	(Czech Republic) D Allertová (Czech Republic) Kr Plíšková	4	6	[8]
(Slovakia) J Čepelová (Czech Republic) L Hradecká	6	6
(Austria) S Klemenschits (Slovenia) A Klepač	0	4
3	(Uzbekistan) A Amanmuradova (Greece) E Daniilidou	1	6	[10]
WC	(Czech Republic) K Siniaková (Czech Republic) T Smitková	6	4	[3]
(Serbia) A Krunić (Poland) K Piter	6	6
(Netherlands) R Hogenkamp (Sweden) J Larsson	2	2
(Canada) G Dabrowski (United States) M Sanchez	4	7	[10]
WC	(Czech Republic) S Heinová (Czech Republic) D Paterová	6	5	[7]
(Australia) T Patterson (Switzerland) C Perrin	6^{5}	4
4	(United States) J Craybas (Serbia) V Dolonc	7^{7}	6
(Hungary) M Czink (Ukraine) E Svitolina	1	3
(Russia) N Bratchikova (Romania) A Cadanțu	6	6
(United States) J Cohen (United States) A Riske	6	2	[4]
2	(United States) I Falconi (Czech Republic) E Hrdinová	4	6	[10]

Quarterfinals
1	(Czech Republic) R Voráčová (Czech Republic) B Záhlavová-Strýcová	6	6
(Slovakia) J Čepelová (Czech Republic) L Hradecká	0	2
3	(Uzbekistan) A Amanmuradova (Greece) E Daniilidou	2	2
(Serbia) A Krunić (Poland) K Piter	6	6
(Canada) G Dabrowski (United States) M Sanchez	2	6	[9]
4	(United States) J Craybas (Serbia) V Dolonc	6	3	[11]
(Russia) N Bratchikova (Romania) A Cadanțu	2	3
2	(United States) I Falconi (Czech Republic) E Hrdinová	6	6

Semifinals
1	(Czech Republic) R Voráčová (Czech Republic) B Záhlavová-Strýcová	6	6
(Serbia) A Krunić (Poland) K Piter	1	2
4	(United States) J Craybas (Serbia) V Dolonc	7^{7}	6^{2}	[7]
2	(United States) I Falconi (Czech Republic) E Hrdinová	6^{3}	7^{7}	[10]

Final
1	(Czech Republic) R Voráčová (Czech Republic) B Záhlavová-Strýcová	6	6
2	(United States) I Falconi (Czech Republic) E Hrdinová	4	0
