= 2014 Sparta Prague Open =

- Date: 12–18 May
- Edition: 5th
- Category: ITF Women's Circuit
- Prize money: $100,000+H
- Surface: Clay
- Location: Prague, Czech Republic
- Venue: TK Sparta Prague

Champions

Singles
- (United Kingdom) Heather Watson

Doubles
- (Czech Republic) Lucie Hradecká / (Netherlands) Michaëlla Krajicek
- Sparta Prague Open

The 2014 Sparta Prague Open was a professional tennis tournament played on outdoor clay courts. It was the fifth edition of the tournament and part of the 2014 ITF Women's Circuit, offering a total of $100,000+H in prize money. It took place in Prague, Czech Republic, from 12 to 18 May 2014.

== Singles main draw entrants ==
=== Seeds ===
Country	Player	Rank^{1}	Seed
CZE	Lucie Šafářová	25	1
CZE	Klára Koukalová	31	2
CZE	Barbora Záhlavová-Strýcová	55	3
BEL	Yanina Wickmayer	58	4
CZE	Karolína Plíšková	65	5
SVK	Anna Karolína Schmiedlová	68	6
GER	Dinah Pfizenmaier	82	7
JPN	Misaki Doi	91	8

- ^{1} Rankings as of 5 May 2014

=== Other entrants ===
The following players received wildcards into the singles main draw:

- (Czech Republic) Simona Heinová
- (Czech Republic) Kateřina Siniaková
- (Czech Republic) Tereza Smitková
- (Slovakia) Petra Uberalová

The following players received entry from the qualifying draw:

- (Russia) Ekaterina Alexandrova
- (United States) Madison Brengle
- (United States) Victoria Duval
- (Russia) Ksenia Pervak

The following player received entry by a special exempt:

- (Serbia) Aleksandra Krunić

== Champions ==
=== Singles ===
- (United Kingdom) Heather Watson def. (Slovakia) Anna Karolína Schmiedlová 7–6^{(7–5)}, 6–0

=== Doubles ===
- (Czech Republic) Lucie Hradecká / (Netherlands) Michaëlla Krajicek def. (Czech Republic) Andrea Hlaváčková / (Czech Republic) Lucie Šafářová 6–3, 6–2
