= 2026 Queen's Club Championships =

- Date: 8–14 June (women); 15–21 June (men)
- Edition: 83rd (women); 123rd (men)
- Category: ATP 500 / WTA 500
- Draw: 32S / 16D (men); 28S / 16D (women)
- Prize money: €2,583,330 (men) $1,915,000 (women)
- Surface: Grass
- Location: London, United Kingdom
- Venue: Queen's Club

Champions

Men's singles
- (Argentina) Francisco Cerúndolo

Women's singles
- (Croatia) Donna Vekić

Men's doubles
- (El Salvador) Marcelo Arévalo / (Croatia) Mate Pavić

Women's doubles
- (Slovakia) Tereza Mihalíková / (United Kingdom) Olivia Nicholls
- Queen's Club Championships

The 2026 Queen's Club Championships (also known as the HSBC Championships for sponsorship reasons) was a professional tennis tournament played on outdoor grass courts at the Queen's Club in London, United Kingdom. It was the 123rd edition of the event for the men and the 83rd edition for the women. The women's event was classified as a WTA 500 tournament on the 2026 WTA Tour and took place from 8 to 14 June. The men's event was classified as an ATP Tour 500 tournament on the 2026 ATP Tour and took place from 15 to 21 June.

== Champions ==
=== Men's singles ===
- (Argentina) Francisco Cerúndolo def. (United States) Tommy Paul, 6–7^{(4–7)}, 6–4, 6–3

=== Women's singles ===
- (Croatia) Donna Vekić def. (United Kingdom) Emma Raducanu, 6–0, 7–6^{(8–6)}

=== Men's doubles ===
- (El Salvador) Marcelo Arévalo / (Croatia) Mate Pavić def. (Finland) Harri Heliövaara / (United Kingdom) Henry Patten, 6–2, 6–4

=== Women's doubles ===
- (Slovakia) Tereza Mihalíková / (United Kingdom) Olivia Nicholls def. (Canada) Leylah Fernandez / (Germany) Laura Siegemund, 6–3, 6–7^{(4–7)}, [10–5]

== Point distribution ==
Event	W	F	SF	QF	Round of 16	Round of 32	Q	Q2	Q1
Men's singles	500	330	200	100	50	0	25	13	0
Men's doubles	500	300	180	90	0	—N/a	45	25	0
Women's singles	500	325	195	108	60	1	25	13	1
Women's doubles	500	325	195	108	1	—N/a	—N/a	—N/a	—N/a

== ATP singles main-draw entrants ==
=== Seeds ===
Country	Player	Rank^{1}	Seed
AUS	Alex de Minaur	6	1
CZE	Jiří Lehečka	12	2
CZE	Jakub Menšík	17	3
ESP	Alejandro Davidovich Fokina	22	4
~~ESP~~	~~Rafael Jódar~~	~~23~~	~~5~~
FRA	Arthur Rinderknech	24	6
ARG	Francisco Cerúndolo	27	7
USA	Tommy Paul	28	8

- ^{1} Rankings are as of 8 June 2026.

=== Other entrants ===
The following players received wildcards into the main draw:

- (United Kingdom) Arthur Fery
- (United Kingdom) Jack Pinnington Jones
- (United Kingdom) Toby Samuel

The following player received entry as a special exempt:

- (Poland) Kamil Majchrzak

The following players received entry from the qualifying draw:

- (United States) Martin Damm
- (Australia) Rinky Hijikata
- (France) Giovanni Mpetshi Perricard
- (United Kingdom) Harry Wendelken

The following players received entry as lucky losers:

- (United States) Marcos Giron
- (United States) Aleksandar Kovacevic
- (United States) Zachary Svajda

=== Withdrawals ===
- (Belgium) Alexander Blockx → replaced by (United States) Aleksandar Kovacevic
- (Italy) Luciano Darderi → replaced by (Peru) Ignacio Buse
- (United Kingdom) Jack Draper → replaced by (Canada) Gabriel Diallo
- (Spain) Rafael Jódar → replaced by (United States) Marcos Giron
- (Spain) Jaume Munar → replaced by (United States) Zachary Svajda
- (Italy) Lorenzo Musetti → replaced by (Netherlands) Botic van de Zandschulp
- (Denmark) Holger Rune → replaced by (Hungary) Márton Fucsovics
- (Monaco) Valentin Vacherot → replaced by (Serbia) Hamad Medjedovic

== ATP doubles main-draw entrants ==
=== Seeds ===
Country	Player	Country	Player	Rank^{1}	Seed
FIN	Harri Heliövaara	GBR	Henry Patten	2	1
GBR	Julian Cash	GBR	Lloyd Glasspool	12	2
USA	Christian Harrison	GBR	Neal Skupski	20	3
ESA	Marcelo Arévalo	CRO	Mate Pavić	25	4

- ^{1} Rankings are as of 8 June 2026.

=== Other entrants ===
The following pairs received wildcards into the doubles main draw:

- (United Kingdom) Luke Johnson / (Poland) Jan Zieliński
- (United Kingdom) David Stevenson / (United Kingdom) Marcus Willis

The following pair received entry from the qualifying draw:

- (Germany) Constantin Frantzen / (Netherlands) Robin Haase

== WTA singles main draw entrants ==
=== Seeds ===
Country	Player	Rank^{1}	Seed
KAZ	Elena Rybakina	2	1
USA	Amanda Anisimova	6	2
CAN	Victoria Mboko	9	3
~~SUI~~	~~Belinda Bencic~~	~~11~~	~~4~~
~~UKR~~	~~Marta Kostyuk~~	~~15~~	~~5~~
USA	Iva Jovic	17	6
ROU	Sorana Cîrstea	18	7
CAN	Leylah Fernandez	22	8

- ^{1} Rankings are as of 25 May 2026.

=== Other entrants ===
The following players received wildcards into the main draw:

- (United Kingdom) Katie Boulter
- (United Kingdom) Harriet Dart
- (United Kingdom) Francesca Jones
- (United Kingdom) Mika Stojsavljevic

The following player received entry using a protected ranking:

- (Czech Republic) Karolína Plíšková

The following player received entry as a Top 30 replacement player into the singles main draw:

- (Kazakhstan) Elena Rybakina

The following players received entry from the qualifying draw:

- Anna Blinkova
- (Australia) Maddison Inglis
- (Uzbekistan) Polina Kudermetova
- (Germany) Tatjana Maria
- (Croatia) Antonia Ružić
- (China) Zhang Shuai

The following players received entry as lucky losers:

- (Uzbekistan) Kamilla Rakhimova
- (Croatia) Donna Vekić

=== Withdrawals ===
- (United States) Hailey Baptiste → replaced by (Philippines) Alexandra Eala
- (Switzerland) Belinda Bencic → replaced by (Uzbekistan) Kamilla Rakhimova
- Anna Kalinskaya → replaced by (Greece) Maria Sakkari
- (Ukraine) Marta Kostyuk → replaced by (Croatia) Donna Vekić
- (United States) Ann Li → replaced by (United States) McCartney Kessler
- (Czech Republic) Linda Nosková → replaced by (Kazakhstan) Elena Rybakina
- (United States) Jessica Pegula → replaced by (Czech Republic) Karolína Plíšková
- Diana Shnaider → replaced by (Germany) Laura Siegemund

== WTA doubles main draw entrants ==
=== Seeds ===
Country	Player	Country	Player	Rank^{1}	Seed
KAZ	Anna Danilina	SRB	Aleksandra Krunić	11	1
CAN	Gabriela Dabrowski	BRA	Luisa Stefani	33	2
USA	Nicole Melichar-Martinez	NZL	Erin Routliffe	29	3
AUS	Storm Hunter	CHN	Zhang Shuai	30	4

- ^{1} Rankings are as of 25 May 2026.

=== Other entrants ===
The following pairs received wildcards into the doubles main draw:

- (United Kingdom) Katie Boulter / (United Kingdom) Emma Raducanu
- (Canada) Victoria Mboko / (United States) Serena Williams

The following pair received entry using a protected ranking:

- (Croatia) Darija Jurak Schreiber / (Poland) Alicja Rosolska
