= Heather Watson =

British tennis player (born 1992)

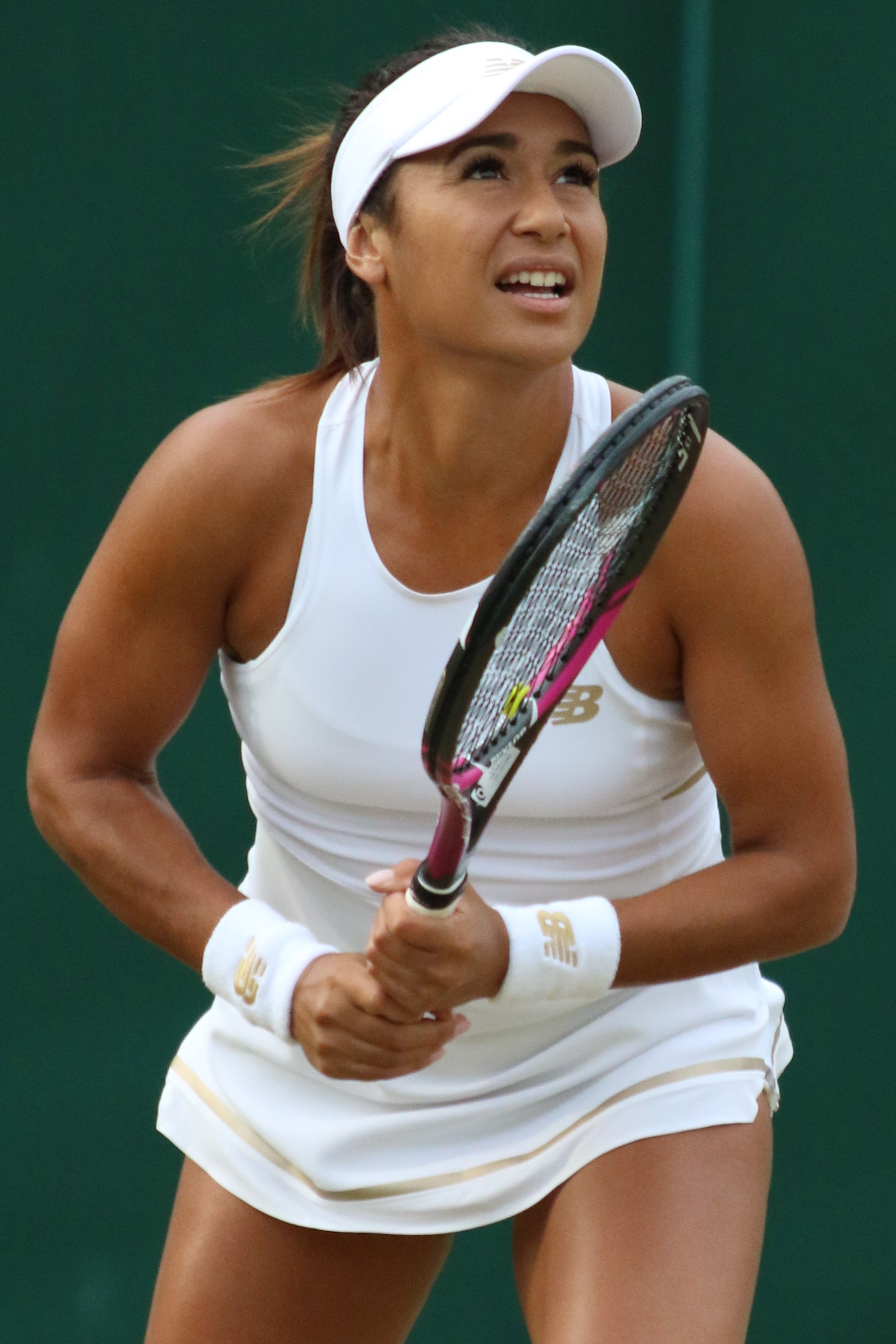
- Watson at the 2019 Wimbledon Championships
- Country (sports): Great Britain
- Born: 19 May 1992 (age 34) Saint Peter Port, Guernsey
- Height: 1.70 m (5 ft 7 in)
- Turned pro: 2010
- Plays: Right-handed (two-handed backhand)
- Coach: Diego Veronelli
- Prize money: US$ 6,204,969

Singles
- Career record: 445–376
- Career titles: 4
- Highest ranking: No. 38 (19 January 2015)
- Current ranking: No. 361 (2 November 2026)

Grand Slam singles results
- Australian Open: 3R (2013)
- French Open: 2R (2011, 2012, 2014, 2015, 2016, 2018)
- Wimbledon: 4R (2022)
- US Open: 1R (2011–18, 2020–21)

Other tournaments
- Olympic Games: 2R (2012, 2016)

Doubles
- Career record: 191–202
- Career titles: 5
- Highest ranking: No. 39 (25 February 2019)
- Current ranking: No. 351 (2 November 2026)

Grand Slam doubles results
- Australian Open: 3R (2021)
- French Open: 2R (2018, 2022)
- Wimbledon: QF (2018)
- US Open: 3R (2024)

Other doubles tournaments
- Olympic Games: QF (2024)

Mixed doubles
- Career record: 13–8
- Career titles: 1

Grand Slam mixed doubles results
- Australian Open: QF (2024)
- French Open: 2R (2024)
- Wimbledon: W (2016)
- US Open: 1R (2017)

Other mixed doubles tournaments
- Olympic Games: QF (2016)

Team competitions
- BJK Cup: SF (2022, 2024), record 31–16
Medal record
Tennis
Representing Guernsey
Commonwealth Youth Games
Gold medal – first place	2008 Pune	Singles
- Last updated on: 2 November 2026.

Heather Miriam Watson (born 19 May 1992) is a British professional tennis player. A former British No. 1, Watson has won ten titles over her career, including the mixed-doubles title at the 2016 Wimbledon Championships, partnering Henri Kontinen, making her the first British woman to win a major title since Jo Durie in 1991, and the first to win a Wimbledon title since Durie in 1987. In October 2012, Watson won her first WTA Tour singles title at the Japan Women's Open, becoming the first British woman to win such a title since Sara Gomer in 1988.

As a junior, Watson won the US Open and a gold medal at the 2008 Commonwealth Youth Games. She reached No. 3 in the world on the ITF Junior Circuit.

== Early life and junior years ==
Heather Watson was born in Saint Peter Port, Guernsey to Michelle and Ian Watson. Her mother is from Papua New Guinea and her father is British, and was the managing director of Guernsey Electricity from 1995 until retirement in 2010. She has one brother and two sisters. Watson started playing tennis at the age of seven, and at age twelve she went to the Nick Bollettieri Tennis Academy in Florida.

In 2006, Watson won the British Under-14 Championship. The following year she won the British Under-16 Championship, and reached the semifinals of the British Under-18 Championship. She lost in the under-18 semifinals again in 2008 to eventual winner Tara Moore. In October, Watson travelled to Pune in India to compete at the 2008 Commonwealth Youth Games where she won the gold medal, winning the final against Kyra Shroff. Mother Michelle left her job in 2008 to travel full-time with her daughter around the World Junior Circuit.

Watson played her first senior tournament in March 2009 – the $25k Jersey Open, but lost in the second round to Katie O'Brien. At the beginning of July, she became the highest-ranked British junior, overtaking Laura Robson. She achieved her first senior women's world ranking on 27 July 2009, entering at No. 756. She won her first senior title at the Frinton $10k tournament. Watson beat Anna Fitzpatrick in the final. At the 2009 US Open, Watson was seeded 11th for the girls' singles. She reached the quarterfinals on 10 September before rain interrupted the tournament schedule. The tournament moved indoors and Watson beat second seed Noppawan Lertcheewakarn in the quarterfinal on 12 September. She played her semifinal on the same day and was victorious against Daria Gavrilova to reach the final, where she faced doubles partner Yana Buchina and won in straight sets.

At the 2009 French Open, Watson and her partner, as the third seeds, reached the girls' doubles final where she and Tímea Babos faced the second-seeded pair of Noppawan Lertcheewakarn and Elena Bogdan and were beaten in a match tie-break. Partnering Yana Buchina, that year they were the seventh seed at the Australian girls' doubles and sixth seed at the US Open girls' doubles, but they lost in the first round at both tournaments. At Wimbledon, she teamed up with Magda Linette and they were seeded sixth in the girls' doubles but eliminated in the second round.

=== Junior Grand Slam performance ===
Australian Open: QF (2009)
French Open: 1R (2009)
Wimbledon: 1R (2008, 2009)
US Open: W (2009)

=== Grand Slam tournament finals ===
==== Singles: 1 (title) ====
Result	Year	Championship	Surface	Opponent	Score
Win	2009	US Open	Hard	(Russia) Yana Buchina	6–4, 6–1

==== Doubles: 1 (runner-up) ====
Result	Year	Championship	Surface	Partner	Opponents	Score
Loss	2009	French Open	Clay	(Hungary) Tímea Babos	(Romania) Elena Bogdan (Thailand) Noppawan Lertcheewakarn	6–3, 3–6, [8–10]

== Professional ==
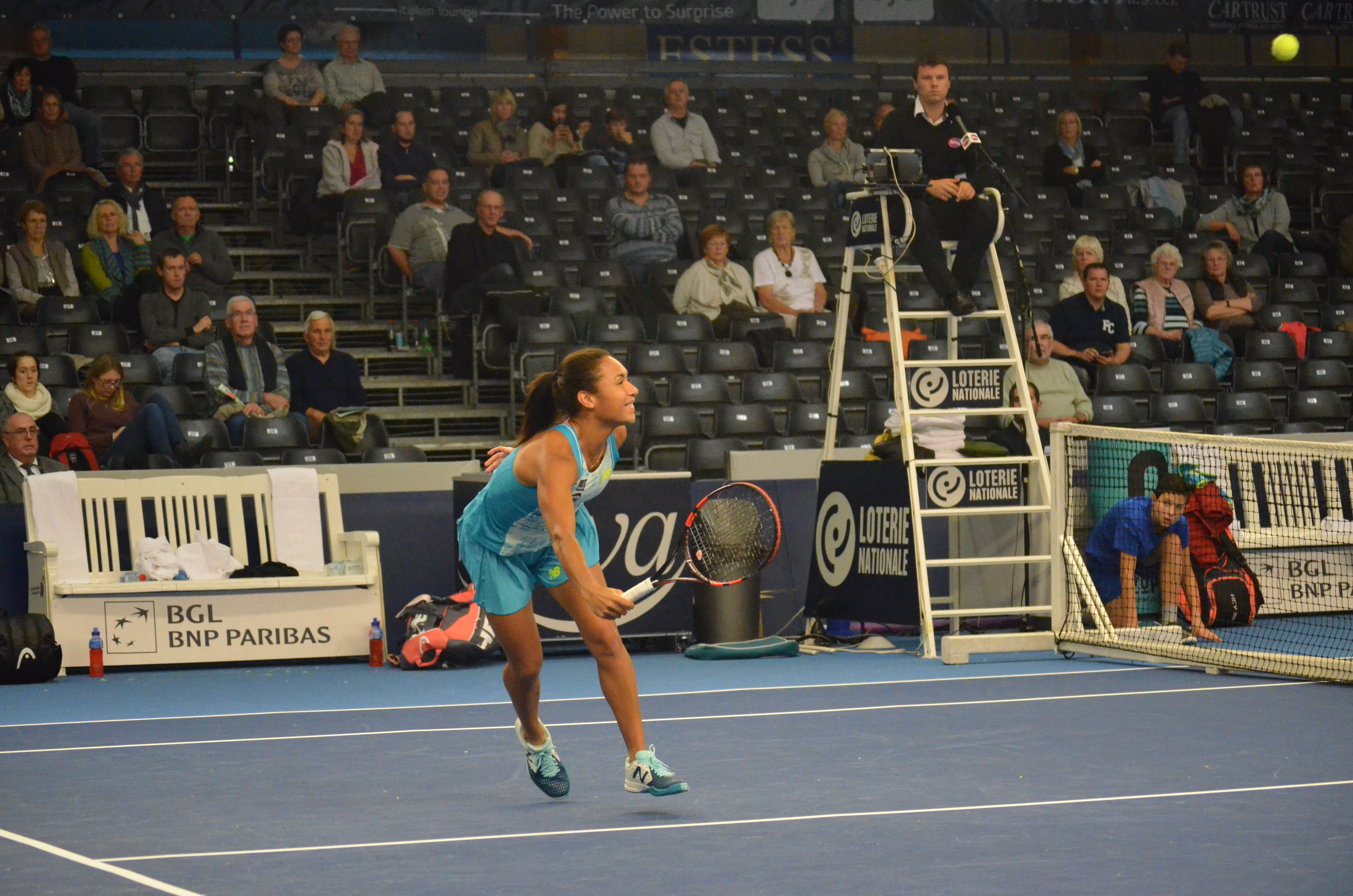
At Kockelsheuer Sports Center

=== 2009: First ITF Circuit title ===
Watson began competing on the ITF Women's Circuit in March when she entered the qualifying tournament for the $10k event in Bath, Somerset, but failed to win a match. She entered her next tournament, a $25k event in Jersey, on a wildcard and beat compatriot Jade Curtis in the first round. She was defeated by another Britain, Katie O'Brien, in round two. In July, she reached her first ITF semifinal as a qualifier in the $10k grass-court tournament in Felixstowe, before losing to Anna Smith. She went on to qualify for the next tournament she entered and again faced Smith in the semifinals; however, this time Watson was victorious and went on to beat Anna Fitzpatrick in the final to win her first title. Continuing to compete on the ITF Circuit for the rest of the season, Watson beat Melanie South in round one of a $50k in Barnstaple in October, before being defeated by Kristina Mladenovic in round two. She ended the 2009 season with a singles ranking of 588.

=== 2010: Turned professional, major debut ===
Watson began 2010 with a wildcard into the $25k event in Sutton, London, where she made the quarterfinals. She immediately flew to the $100k Midland Classic, losing to qualifier and fellow 17-year-old Beatrice Capra in the first round. Two weeks later, she entered the $25k event in Hammond, Louisiana. Watson qualified and went on to reach her second quarterfinal of the year, defeating former world No. 7 and two-time Grand Slam semifinalist, Nicole Vaidišová, and fifth seed Monique Adamczak, en route. The following week, Watson entered another $25k event in Clearwater, Florida. In the final qualifying round, she lost to fellow Brit Georgie Stoop, before being handed a lucky loser spot in the main draw and defeating Anna Tatishvili in the first round. She lost to Zhou Yimiao in round two. Watson was then given a wildcard into the main draw of the Miami Open, but lost to Tsvetana Pironkova in the first round. This was the first time in her career that Watson competed on the WTA Tour. In April, she reached the quarterfinals of a $25k event in Jackson, Mississippi. Following this, she qualified for the WTA Tour event in Charleston, South Carolina, before losing to Elena Vesnina in the first round.

At the Eastbourne International, Watson qualified for the main draw by defeating Anna Smith, Tsvetana Pironkova and Bojana Jovanovski. Watson defeated world No. 48, Aleksandra Wozniak, in the first round. In the second round, she was defeated by former top-10 player Victoria Azarenka. She then entered the first Grand Slam tournament of her career, after receiving a wildcard into the main draw of Wimbledon. Watson met Romina Oprandi in the first round and lost in three sets. Moving back onto hardcourts, her next tournament was a $25k tournament in Wrexham. She defeated four fellow British players (including Anna Fitzpatrick and Naomi Broady) on her way to the final, where she defeated former top-30 player Sania Mirza to win her second ITF title. In October 2010, she was seeded fifth for the women's singles at the Commonwealth Games, taking the rare opportunity to represent Guernsey. She eventually lost to top seed Anastasia Rodionova of Australia in the quarterfinals. Partnering Patrick Ogier, Watson also reached the quarterfinals of the mixed doubles, where they were defeated by the third seeds Sarah Borwell and Ken Skupski, representing England.

=== 2011: First majors match win & top 100 debut ===
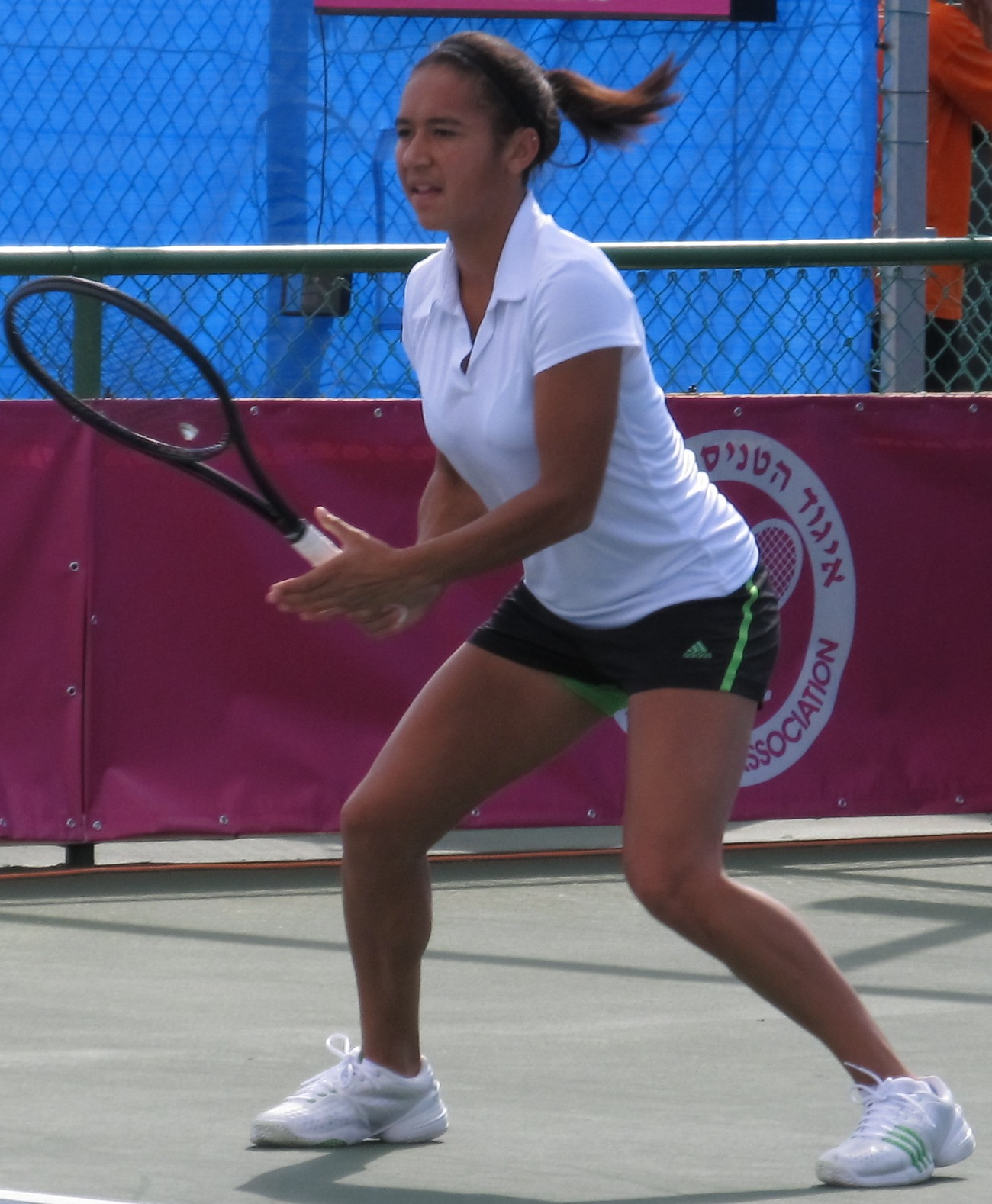
Watson playing in the 2011 Fed Cup

Watson began the season by qualifying for the Auckland Open. She continued her winning streak in the main tournament and beat ninth seed Carla Suárez Navarro to get into the quarterfinals, where she lost to Peng Shuai.

Watson qualified for the Cellular South Cup, going on to reach her second quarterfinal of the year where she lost to Evgeniya Rodina.

On 3 April 2011, Watson won two matches to qualify for the Charleston Open, where she lost a close three-set match to Christina McHale, in the first round.

Watson next attempted to qualify for the Estoril Open. In the first round of qualifying, she beat former world No. 17, Karolina Šprem. She went on to beat Katarzyna Piter in the second round of qualifying, but eventually lost to Tamira Paszek in the final qualifying round.

Watson qualified for the French Open on her debut. She beat Raluca Olaru and Sally Peers in the first and second rounds, respectively, to reach the final round, where she defeated Stefanie Vögele to gain a place in the main draw for the first time. This was the first time a British woman had qualified for the French Open since Kate Brasher, the daughter of Shirley Bloomer and Chris Brasher, in 1983. She played French wildcard Stéphanie Foretz Gacon in the first round and won. The victory saw her break into the top 100 for the first time. In the second round she lost to 16th seed Kaia Kanepi in the second round.

Watson continued her good form entering the grass-court season when she beat 15th seed Chanelle Scheepers in the first round of the Birmingham Classic. She followed this up by beating Misaki Doi in the second round. However, she lost to third seed and eventual semifinalist Peng Shuai in the third round.

On 22 June 2011, Watson played Mathilde Johansson in her first-round match in the Wimbledon Championships winning the opening set, before suffering an arm injury in the second set. Johansson then went on to win in three sets.

On 29 August 2011, in the first round of the US Open, Watson lost in three sets to former champion, Maria Sharapova. After the match Sharapova stated "There's no doubt that she's a great up-and-coming player".

=== 2012: Wimbledon 3rd round, maiden WTA Tour title, top 50 debut ===
Watson lost in the first round of the Australian Open to the eventual champion Victoria Azarenka.

Watson was selected for the British Fed Cup Team to play in the Europe/Africa Group-1 match at Eilat, Israel on 1–4 February 2012. In the group stages she played doubles with Laura Robson, defeating pairs from Portugal and the Netherlands and Israel in the group stages. Robson and Watson were not required to play their doubles in the play-off match against Austria as Anne Keothavong and Elena Baltacha won their singles rubbers, and the 2–0 lead qualified the team for a place in the World Group II promotion play-off in April 2012.

Watson won three rounds in qualifying for the French Open at Roland Garros in May 2012. She then defeated Elena Vesnina in the first round, matching her 2011 result in the tournament. In the second round, she was defeated by the 25th seed Julia Görges of Germany.

In June, ranked No. 103, Watson defeated world No. 52, Iveta Benešová, in her first singles win at 2012 Wimbledon Championships. She then beat Jamie Hampton, becoming the first British woman since 2002 to reach the third round of Wimbledon. In the third round, Watson lost to the third seed and eventual runner-up, Agnieszka Radwańska.

At the Stanford Classic, Watson lost in the second round to world No. 37, Yanina Wickmayer, after a victory over the world No. 49, Sloane Stephens. She won the doubles competition of the Stanford Classic, where she played with Marina Erakovic to beat Vania King and Jarmila Gajdošová in a second set tiebreak. This was her first title on the full WTA Tour. At the Carlsbad Open, she beat Eleni Daniilidou to set up a second round meeting with qualifier Chan Yung-jan. However, she lost the match.

She received a wildcard from the ITF into the singles tournament at the London Olympics, where she defeated Sílvia Soler Espinosa, before losing her second-round match to Maria Kirilenko. She also played in the women's doubles in the Olympic tournament with Laura Robson, losing in the first round to Angelique Kerber and Sabine Lisicki. Her next tournament was the Texas Open where in the singles she lost to Yanina Wickmayer in the first round. However, she went on to win the doubles competition alongside Marina Erakovic.

Watson gained automatic entry into the main draw of the US Open but was beaten in the first round by Li Na. She then qualified for the Pan Pacific Open and beat Sabine Lisicki in the first round, but then lost to Maria Sharapova.

Watson made a WTA Tour singles final for the first time in her career at the HP Open where she beat Polona Hercog, sixth seed Anabel Medina Garrigues, Pauline Parmentier and Misaki Doi. In the final, she saved four match points to beat Chang Kai-chen in a match lasting 3 hours and 12 minutes. With this win, Watson attained a top-50 ranking for the first time in her career, at the same time overtaking compatriot Laura Robson as the British No. 1. Watson also became the first Briton to win a WTA singles title since Sara Gomer in 1988. She also made the doubles final in the same event with Kimiko Date-Krumm, but lost to Raquel Kops-Jones and Abigail Spears.

=== 2013: Australian Open 3rd round and top 40 ===
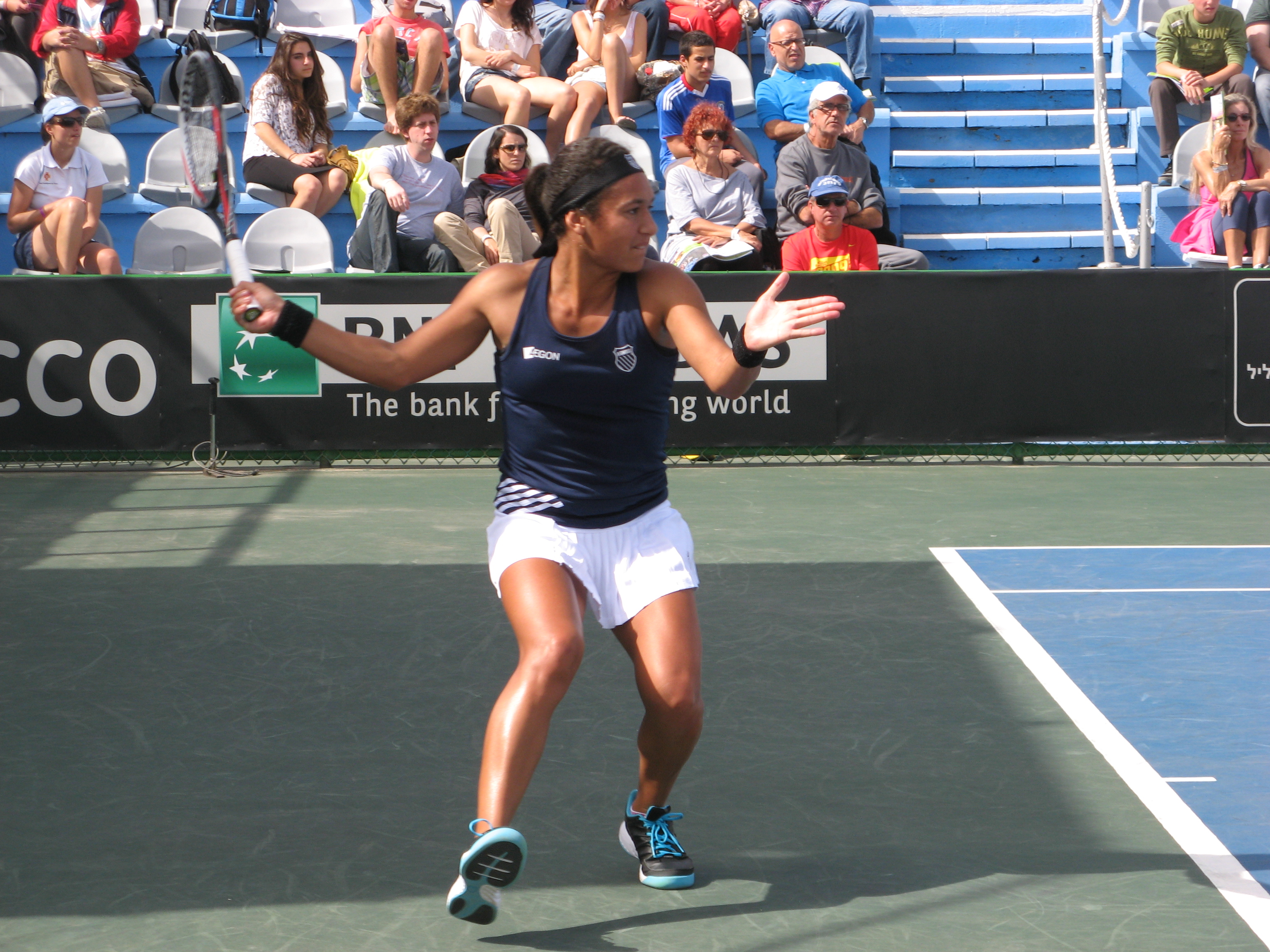
Watson during the 2013 Fed Cup

Watson began the year in the top 50 and therefore qualified for the Australian Open. She reached the second round for the first time in her career thanks to a three-set victory against the Romanian Alexandra Cadanțu. In the second round, she came back from trailing Ksenia Pervak by a set and 6–3 in the tie break, to win in three sets. She faced world No. 4, Agnieszka Radwańska, in the third round, where she was beaten in two sets. This run saw Watson rise to a career-high world ranking of 40.

Watson's next tournament was the Pattaya Open where she was eighth seed and reached the second round but lost to Anastasija Sevastova. She then competed in the Fed Cup, helping Great Britain reach a World Group II Play-off tie with victories over Tímea Babos of Hungary and Tsvetana Pironkova of Bulgaria in the Euro/Africa Group I Play-off.

Her next tournament was the U.S. Indoor Championships in Memphis where she was seeded fourth. In the first round, she overcame a tense battle with world No. 109, Galina Voskoboeva. She then defeated Andrea Hlaváčková in another three-setter before losing to Stefanie Vögele in the quarterfinals.

Watson was forced to miss Great Britain's Fed Cup Play-off against Argentina after contracting glandular fever. Her first game back after recovering was at the French Open, where she lost to Stefanie Vögele in three sets, saying after the match she knew it would be tough but that she was very disappointed.

Beginning the grass-court season, she entered the Birmingham Classic seeded 14th and defeated Melinda Czink in the first round, her first victory since returning from her illness before she lost to qualifier Alla Kudryavtseva. At the Eastbourne International, Watson upset world No. 27, Varvara Lepchenko, in the first round in two sets. At Wimbledon, she lost in the first round to Madison Keys.

Before the US Open Series, she decided to change coaches by hiring Jeremy Bates and won her first post-Wimbledon match against wildcard Alexandra Mueller at the Washington Open. Watson then lost in the next round to fourth-seed Alizé Cornet, in straight sets.

=== 2014: Third career doubles title ===
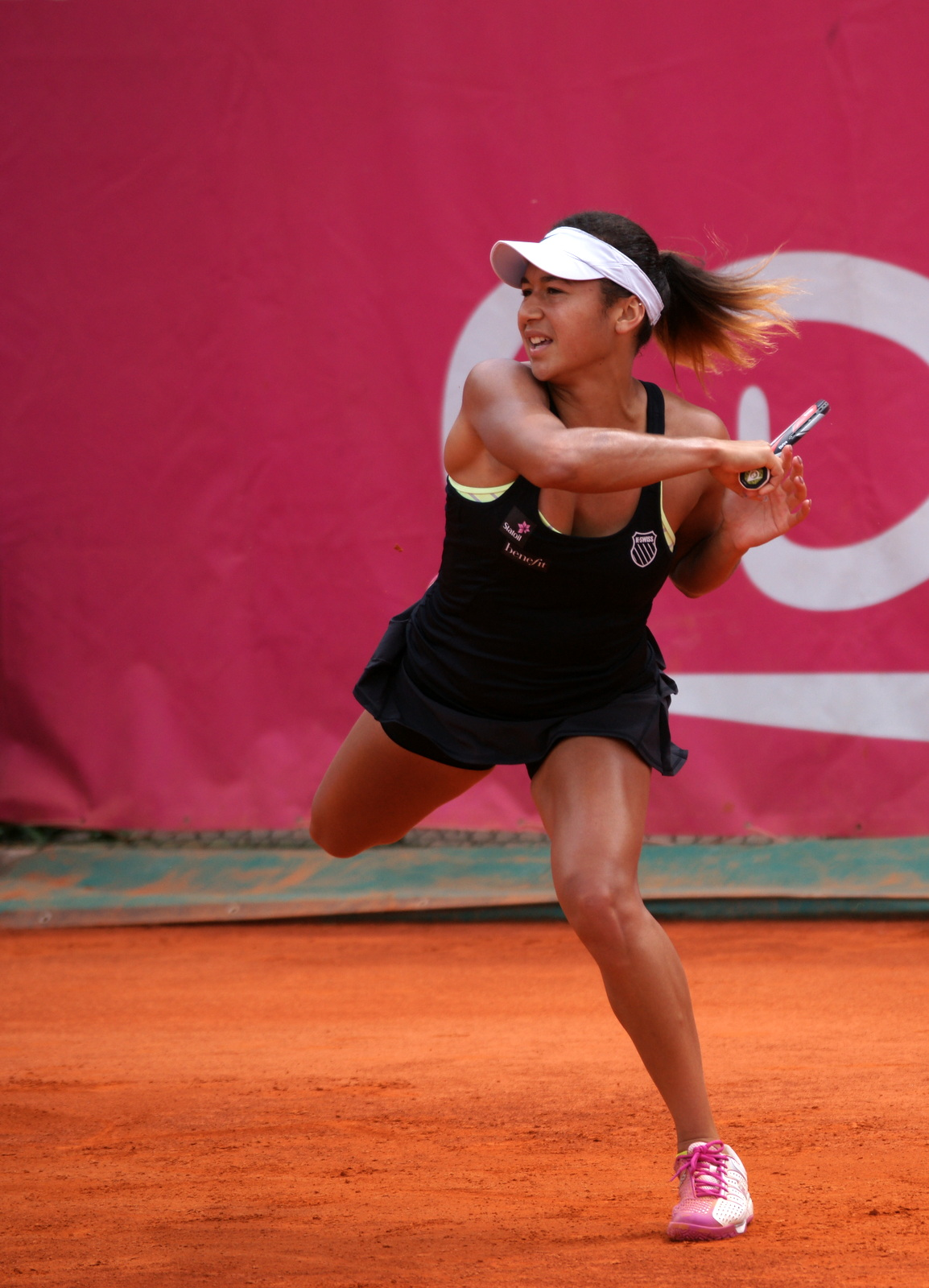
Heather Watson at the 2014 Open de Cagnes-sur-Mer

Watson qualified for the Australian Open. She faced 31st seed Daniela Hantuchová and lost in three sets.

In Fed Cup, Watson continued her impressive run winning all four of her singles rubbers in the Europe/Africa Zone. Despite her victories, which included two top 40 scalps defeating Yvonne Meusburger of Austria and Romanian world No. 26, Sorana Cîrstea,

Watson then proceeded to compete at the second-tier Midland Tennis Classic where she defeated Ksenia Pervak in the final to win her fourth ITF title and, partnering Anna Tatishvili, she also reached the doubles final and won after a deciding champions tiebreak.

Watson re-entered the WTA top 100, after winning the Sparta Prague Open in May. She defeated three top-100 players – Klára Koukalová, Karolína Plíšková and Tímea Babos – en route to the final of the $100k event. Due to poor weather, Watson was forced to play her semifinal with Babos on the final's day. She claimed a two-set victory, before defeating sixth seed Anna Karolína Schmiedlová (who had played most of her semifinal the day before) in the final.

Her impressive form carried over to the French Open where she came through three rounds of qualifying to reach the main draw. In the first round, Watson defeated Barbora Záhlavová-Strýcová in straight sets before falling to world No. 4, Simona Halep, in the second round.

At Eastbourne, she defeated sixth seed Flavia Pennetta, in three sets, in the second round on the way to the semifinals where she lost to Madison Keys.

At Wimbledon where she played Ajla Tomljanović and defeated her in straight sets. She then played Angelique Kerber, the ninth seed, in the second round losing in three sets.

Watson won her third career doubles title at the Baku Cup, partnering with Alexandra Panova. In the final, they crushed Raluca Olaru and Shahar Pe'er.

Watson qualified for the Rogers Cup, making it to the third round where she was defeated by eighth seed Victoria Azarenka. She then qualifyed for the Cincinnati Open, before losing to Zhang Shuai in the first round in three sets.

=== 2015: Second career singles title ===
Watson won her second career title at the Hobart International. She did not drop a set throughout the tournament and defeated Madison Brengle in the final.

During the Indian Wells Open, she recorded her first top-ten win with a two-set victory over world No. 8, Agnieszka Radwańska, to move into the fourth round for the first time, where she lost to Carla Suárez Navarro in three sets.

At Wimbledon, Watson made it into the third round for the second time in her career. She was then pitted against the world No. 1, Serena Williams, and was two points away from winning, but lost in three sets in a match described by pundits as a "thriller". Following the match, Williams applauded Watson's efforts and went on to say that "she should have won the match". Watson's efforts at Wimbledon pushed her back up to world No. 55.

Over the course of the rest of the season, her best result was a quarterfinal showing at the Hong Kong Open where she lost to Samantha Stosur.

=== 2016: Wimbledon mixed-doubles champion, 3rd singles title ===
Watson represented Great Britain at the Hopman Cup with Andy Murray. She was beaten by Caroline Garcia in the tie against France, but went on to win against Daria Gavrilova and Sabine Lisicki. Great Britain almost reached the final against Ukraine, but the Australia team of Daria Gavrilova and Nick Kyrgios won their tie against France, placing them ahead of Great Britain in the round-robin results.

As the world No. 53, Watson then started her season at the Hobart International, attempting to defend her title. The tournament was interrupted by multiple rain delays, with Watson losing in the quarterfinals, playing twice in one day. At the Australian Open, she was narrowly beaten in the first round by Tímea Babos.

In Mexico at the Monterrey Open, Watson defeated No. 2 seed Caroline Wozniacki and No. 4 seed Caroline Garcia on her way to the title, beating Kirsten Flipkens in the championship match for her third WTA title.

At the Miami Open, her strong form continued with two wins over higher-ranked players including world No. 22, Sloane Stephens, before a fourth round defeat by world No. 5, Simona Halep.

On grass courts, Watson's second-round appearance at the Birmingham Classic with a win over Camila Giorgi resulted in her re-entry into the world's top 50.

At Wimbledon, she won the mixed doubles title with Henri Kontinen, defeating Robert Farah and Anna-Lena Grönefeld in the final.

Watson represented Great Britain at the 2016 Summer Olympics.

=== 2017: Wimbledon 3rd round ===
Starting the year at the Hopman Cup partnered with Daniel Evans, the duo were knocked out in the group stages, between them winning only one of nine matches. In Melbourne at the Australian Open, Watson beat seeded Samantha Stosur to get through to the second round. She was the Europe/Africa Zone Group I 2017 winner of the Fed Cup Heart Award, which is awarded for commitment to their players team and the Fed Cup competition.

Watson was runner-up at the ITF event of Surbiton and reached Eastbourne semifinals, defeating top-10 player Dominika Cibulková in the second round, Anastasia Pavlyuchenkova in the third and Barbora Strýcová in the quarterfinals, before falling to Caroline Wozniacki. At Wimbledon, she defeated 18th seed Anastasija Sevastova in the second round before bowing out against Victoria Azarenka in three sets.

=== 2018: Loss of form, Wimbledon doubles quarters ===
A first round defeat at the Prague Open in April to Anna Karolína Schmiedlová was Watson's eighth consecutive loss on the WTA Tour. She finally snapped her losing streak when she defeated Kateryna Bondarenko in the first round of the Nuremberg Cup at the end of May to record her first win in four months.

As the top seed, Watson lost in the first round of the Surbiton Trophy to world No. 184, Gabriella Taylor. and went on to fail to win a match during the grass-court season. Watson was docked a point for swearing as she and Tatjana Maria lost to Katerina Siniaková and Barbora Krejčíková in the doubles quarterfinals at Wimbledon.

At San Jose she defeated Claire Liu, before losing to Venus Williams. Watson showed signs of form when she reached the final of an ITF event in Canada, before losing to Misaki Doi. She carried this form into the US Open qualifying where she won three successive matches to reach the main draw. However, Watson was unable to get her first main-draw win in New York as she lost in three sets to Ekaterina Makarova. Watson reached the semifinals in Quebec, but lost in a deciding set tiebreak against Pauline Parmentier.

=== 2019–20: Fourth WTA Tour title ===
In October 2019, she reached the final of the Tianjin Open, which she lost to Rebecca Peterson.

Her 2020 season started well, reaching the semifinals as a qualifier in Hobart, defeating top seed Elise Mertens en route, before losing to eventual champion Elena Rybakina. She took this form to the 2020 Australian Open, where she defeated Kristýna Plíšková in the opening round, before losing to Mertens.

In the Fed Cup Play-offs, Watson represented Great Britain in their tie away in Slovakia. She lost to Anna Karolína Schmiedlová in the opening match, before beating Rebecca Sramkova on the following day. Great Britain eventually lost the tie 1–3.

In February 2020, Watson played at the Mexican Open in Acapulco, winning her fourth career singles title. She defeated CoCo Vandeweghe, Kateryna Bondarenko, Christina McHale and Wang Xiyu to reach the final, where she overcame qualifier Leylah Fernandez in three sets, clinching the match on her 10th championship point. The win propelled Watson back into the world's top 50 (No. 49) for the first time since 2016.

She participated in the Battle of the Brits Team Tennis event, held in London in late July 2020, notching up a number of wins in singles and teaming up with Jamie Murray in mixed doubles.

When the WTA Tour resumed following the COVID-19 pause, Watson lost in the first round at the 2020 US Open to British No. 1 and world No. 13, Johanna Konta.

Watson won the Battle of the Brits Premier League women's event, held in December 2020.

=== 2021: Birmingham semifinal ===
The highlight of Watson's 2021 season was a semifinal appearance at the Birmingham Classic, defeating third seed Donna Vekić in two sets to become just the third Brit player to reach the last four in the Birmingham tournament's 31-year history, following Anne Hobbs in 1984 and Jo Durie in 1992. She also took part in her third Olympics at the delayed Tokyo Games.

=== 2022: Wimbledon 4th round, BJK Cup semifinalist ===
At the Australian Open beating Mayar Sherif in a close three-set encounter, before losing to Zidanšek.

She qualified for the main draw at Indian Wells where lost in the first round to Tereza Martincová.

At the Miami Open, Watson broke a six-year losing streak at the event when she defeated Arantxa Rus in the first round where after a 3-hour 25 minute battle. She then overcame 15th seed Elina Svitolina before losing her next match to 22nd seed Belinda Bencic.

At the Nottingham Open, she defeated Katie Volynets in the first round despite needing a medical timeout towards the end of the first set. In the second round, however, she lost in straight sets to Viktoria Golubic.

In her 12th attempt, Watson finally reached the fourth round at Wimbledon defeating Kaja Juvan, before losing to Jule Niemeier.

At the close of the season she helped the Great Britain team reach the semifinals of the BJK Cup.

=== 2023: Nottingham semifinal ===
At the 2023 Australian Open, she went out in the first round of qualifying. It was the first year since 2012 that she feature in the main-draw at the event.

She reached her first tour quarterfinal in almost two years at Hua Hin with wins over second seed Yulia Putintseva and Han Na-lae. She lost in the last eight to seventh seed Wang Xinyu.

Watson made it through qualifying at the Austin Open where she defeated Danka Kovinić in the first round, before losing to fifth seed Sloane Stephens.

At the Nottingham Open, she made her first tour semifinal since 2021 with wins over Jule Niemeier, Tatjana Maria and Viktorija Golubic. Her run was ended by eventual champion Katie Boulter.

=== 2024: Fourth Olympics and doubles quarterfinal ===
After being given a wildcard entry, Watson lost to Greet Minnen in the first round at Wimbledon.

She was selected to play doubles alongside Katie Boulter at the 2024 Summer Olympics which was her fourth appearance at the Games. The pair reached the quarterfinals, defeating sixth seeded Brazilian duo Beatriz Haddad Maia and Luisa Stefani in the second round, before losing to third seeds and eventual gold medalists, Sara Errani and Jasmine Paolini from Italy. Watson went out in the second qualifying round for the US Open, losing in straight sets to Aliaksandra Sasnovich.

Watson qualified for the newly upgraded WTA 500 Korea Open, defeating Ku Yeon-woo in the final round of the qualifying competition. She overcame Lu Jiajing in the first round to record only her third main draw singles win of the season. This was her twelfth win in fourteen singles matches 180. Watson lost in the second round to Marta Kostyuk.

At the Billie Jean King Cup finals in November, Watson and Olivia Nicholls lost to Viktória Hrunčáková and Tereza Mihalikova in the decivisve doubles match as Great Britain were eliminated in the semifinals by Slovakia.

=== 2025: Puerto Vallarta semifinal ===
Watson defeated Lola Radivojević to reach the second qualifying round at the Australian Open, where she was eliminated by Varvara Lepchenko.

In March at the WTA 125 Puerto Vallarta Open, Watson overcame Whitney Osuigwe, sixth seed Sara Sorribes Tormo and Marina Stakusic to reach the semifinals, where she lost to Linda Fruhvirtová.

Watson lost to Daria Saville in the first round of qualifying at the French Open. In June, she qualified for the main-draw at the grass-court Queen's Club Championships in London and defeated world No.27 Yulia Putintseva to reach the second round, where she lost to fourth seed Elena Rybakina. Watson was awarded a wildcard into the main-draw at Wimbledon, but was eliminated in the first round by 23rd seed Clara Tauson.

She lost in the first round of qualifying at the US Open to Ekaterine Gorgodze in three sets. That would prove to be Watson's final match of 2025 due to a tendon issue in her left glute which she revealed had been troubling her since March and eventually forced her to bring an early end to her season.

=== 2026: Continued injury problems ===
Watson confirmed on 3 January that she would miss the Australian Open due to the tendon issue in her glute which had kept her sidelined since August 2025, adding she hoped to return to competition in late February. She made her comeback at the Mérida Open in the last week of February and qualified for the main draw, but lost to seventh seed Jéssica Bouzas Maneiro in the first round.

Having missed out on a wildcard, Watson entered qualifying at Wimbledon for the first time in her career and lost in the third round to Maria Timofeeva in three sets, bringing an end to her streak of 15 consecutive singles main-draw appearances at her home major. Partnering Katie Boulter, she was given a wildcard entry into the women's doubles, where they lost to Katarzyna Piter and Anna Sisková in the first round.

== Playing style ==
Watson is right-handed and plays with a two-handed backhand. Her game is often likened to that of Martina Hingis and she has been praised by Nick Bollettieri for her "amazing footwork". Her on-court intelligence, court sense and timing have been other talking points about her game. According to Nigel Sears, head of women's coaching at the Lawn Tennis Association, Watson possesses "a complete game", with variety including a consistent one-handed backhand slice, volleys and angles. Her game has been described as similar to ATP player Jo-Wilfried Tsonga due to her "big serve" and athleticism.

Upon Watson reaching the 2011 French Open second round, Andy Murray commented "When I saw her for the first time, I thought she was good. I like the way she moves on the court. She's very balanced". Bollettieri stated that Watson's "game is based on great movement, but she's not afraid to whack the ball. She's not easy to beat. She has very good ground strokes, though she can over-hit and strike the ball a little too flat at times".

== Playing equipment ==
In 2011, Watson used the Dunlop Biomimetic 300 Tour tennis racquet, and has also played with, and endorsed, the Dunlop Srixon CX 200 LS. Since the end of 2020, Watson has started to use the Babolat Pure Strike racquet, that she used in 2016 and 2017 as well.

== Personal life ==
From 2016 to 2018, Watson was in a relationship with fellow tennis player Lloyd Glasspool. Between 2019 and 2022, she was in a relationship with Yeovil Town and Morecambe footballer Courtney Duffus. As of August 2024, Watson was in a relationship with footballer Shaun Rooney.

== Career statistics ==
=== Grand Slam performance timelines ===
Key
W	F	SF	QF	#R	RR	Q#	P#	DNQ	A	Z#	PO	G	S	B	NMS	NTI	P	NH

(W) winner; (F) finalist; (SF) semifinalist; (QF) quarterfinalist; (#R) rounds 4, 3, 2, 1; (RR) round-robin stage; (Q#) qualification round; (P#) preliminary round; (DNQ) did not qualify; (A) absent; (Z#) Davis/Fed Cup Zonal Group (with number indication) or (PO) play-off; (G) gold, (S) silver or (B) bronze Olympic/Paralympic medal; (NMS) not a Masters tournament; (NTI) not a Tier I tournament; (P) postponed; (NH) not held; (SR) strike rate (events won / competed); (W–L) win–loss record.
To avoid confusion and double counting, these charts are updated at the conclusion of a tournament or when the player's participation has ended.

==== Singles ====
Tournament	2010	2011	2012	2013	2014	2015	2016	2017	2018	2019	2020	2021	2022	2023	2024	2025	2026	SR	W–L	Win%
Australian Open	A	Q2	1R	3R	1R	1R	1R	2R	1R	1R	2R	2R	2R	Q1	Q1	Q2	A	0 / 11	6–11	35%
French Open	A	2R	2R	1R	2R	2R	2R	Q3	2R	Q2	1R	1R	1R	Q1	Q1	Q1	A	0 / 10	6–10	38%
Wimbledon	1R	1R	3R	1R	2R	3R	1R	3R	1R	2R	NH	1R	4R	1R	1R	1R	Q3	0 / 15	11–15	42%
US Open	Q1	1R	1R	1R	1R	1R	1R	1R	1R	Q1	1R	1R	Q3	Q1	Q2	Q1	Q3	0 / 10	0–10	0%
Win–Loss	0–1	1–3	3–4	2–4	2–4	3–4	1–4	3–3	1–4	1–2	1–3	1–4	4–3	0–1	0–1	0–1	0–0	0 / 46	23–46	33%

==== Doubles ====
Tournament	2010	2011	2012	2013	2014	2015	2016	2017	2018	2019	2020	2021	2022	2023	2024	2025	2026	SR	W–L	Win %
Australian Open	A	A	A	1R	A	2R	2R	1R	1R	1R	A	3R	2R	1R	1R	1R	A	0 / 11	5–11	31%
French Open	A	A	A	1R	A	1R	1R	1R	2R	1R	1R	1R	2R	A	1R	A	A	0 / 10	2–10	17%
Wimbledon	2R	1R	1R	1R	1R	2R	3R	2R	QF	1R	NH	3R	3R	2R	1R	1R	1R	0 / 16	13–16	45%
US Open	A	A	1R	1R	1R	A	2R	1R	1R	A	A	A	A	2R	3R	A	A	0 / 8	4–8	33%
Win–Loss	1–1	0–1	0–2	0–4	0–2	2–3	4–4	1–4	4–4	0–3	0–1	4–3	4–3	2–3	2–4	0–2	0–1	0 / 45	24–45	35%

==== Mixed doubles ====
Tournament	2011	2012	2013	2014	2015	2016	2017	2018	2019	2020	2021	2022	2023	2024	2025	2026	SR	W–L	Win %
Australian Open	A	A	A	A	A	A	A	A	A	A	A	A	A	3R	A	A	0 / 1	2–1	67%
French Open	A	A	1R	A	A	A	A	A	A	NH	A	A	A	2R	A	A	0 / 2	1–2	33%
Wimbledon	2R	2R	2R	1R	1R	W	F	3R	2R	NH	1R	A	2R	2R	1R	2R	1 / 14	17–13	57%
US Open	A	A	A	A	A	A	1R	A	A	NH	A	A	A	A	A	A	0 / 1	0–1	0%
Win–Loss	1–1	1–1	1–2	0–1	0–1	4–0	5–2	1–1	1–1	0–0	0–1	0–0	1–1	4–3	0–1	1–1	1 / 18	20–17	54%

=== Grand Slam tournament finals ===
==== Mixed doubles: 2 (1 title, 1 runner-up) ====
Result	Year	Tournament	Surface	Partner	Opponents	Score
Win	2016	Wimbledon	Grass	(Finland) Henri Kontinen	(Colombia) Robert Farah (Germany) Anna-Lena Grönefeld	7–6^{(7–5)}, 6–4
Loss	2017	Wimbledon	Grass	(Finland) Henri Kontinen	(United Kingdom) Jamie Murray (Switzerland) Martina Hingis	4–6, 4–6

Preceded by Anne Keothavong; Laura Robson; Laura Robson	British Tennis number one 16 July 2012 – 16 September 2012; 15 October 2012 – 7 April 2013; 9 June 2014 – 5 October 2015	Succeeded by Laura Robson; Laura Robson; Johanna Konta
