= 2010 Sparta Prague Open =

- Date: 10–16 May
- Edition: 1st
- Category: ITF Women's Circuit
- Surface: Clay
- Location: Prague; Czech Republic
- Venue: TK Sparta Prague

Champions

Singles
- (Czech Republic) Lucie Hradecká

Doubles
- (Russia) Ksenia Lykina / (Slovenia) Maša Zec Peškirič
- Sparta Prague Open

The 2010 Sparta Prague Open was a professional tennis tournament played on clay courts. It was part of the 2010 ITF Women's Circuit. It took place at TK Sparta Prague in Prague, Czech Republic between 10 and 16 May 2010 with a $50,000 prize money.

== Singles entrants ==
=== Seeds ===
Country	Player	Rank^{1}	Seed
CZE	Lucie Hradecká	77	1
CZE	Sandra Záhlavová	86	2
AUS	Jelena Dokić	106	3
SLO	Maša Zec Peškirič	112	4
RUS	Ksenia Pervak	118	5
BLR	Darya Kustova	135	6
ITA	Anna Floris	151	7
CZE	Andrea Hlaváčková	154	8

- Rankings are of 3 May 2010

=== Other entrants ===
The following players received wildcards into the singles main draw:

- (Czech Republic) Petra Cetkovská
- (Czech Republic) Tereza Jankovská
- (Russia) Aleksandra Romanova
- (Czech Republic) Kateřina Kramperová

The following players received entry from the qualifying draw:

- (China) Lu Jingjing
- (Slovakia) Michaela Hončová
- (Slovakia) Lenka Juríková
- (Finland) Emma Laine

The following players received entry by a lucky loser spot:

- (Netherlands) Daniëlle Harmsen
- (Germany) Lena-Marie Hoffmann
- (Germany) Sarah-Rebecca Sekulic

== Finals ==
=== Singles ===
(Czech Republic) Lucie Hradecká defeated (Croatia) Ajla Tomljanović, 6–1, 7–6^{(7–4)}

=== Doubles ===
(Russia) Ksenia Lykina / (Slovenia) Maša Zec Peškirič defeated (Czech Republic) Petra Cetkovská / (Czech Republic) Eva Hrdinová, 6–3, 6–4
