= 2015 J&T Banka Prague Open =

- Date: 27 April – 2 May
- Edition: 6th
- Category: WTA International
- Draw: 32S / 16D
- Prize money: $250,000
- Surface: Clay / outdoor
- Location: Prague, Czech Republic
- Venue: TK Sparta Prague

Champions

Singles
- (Czech Republic) Karolína Plíšková

Doubles
- (Switzerland) Belinda Bencic / (Czech Republic) Kateřina Siniaková
- J&T Banka Prague Open

The 2015 J&T Banka Prague Open was a professional women's tennis tournaments played on outdoor clay courts. It was the sixth edition of the tournament which was an International tournament on the 2015 WTA Tour. It took place at the TK Sparta Prague in Prague, Czech Republic, from 27 April to 2 May 2015. This was the event's first edition as a WTA International tournament. First-seeded Karolína Plíšková won the singles title, defeating Lucie Hradecká in an all-Czech final.

== Finals ==
=== Singles ===
- (Czech Republic) Karolína Plíšková defeated (Czech Republic) Lucie Hradecká, 4–6, 7–5, 6–3

=== Doubles ===
- (Switzerland) Belinda Bencic / (Czech Republic) Kateřina Siniaková defeated (Ukraine) Kateryna Bondarenko / (Czech Republic) Eva Hrdinová, 6–2, 6–2

== Points and prize money distribution ==
=== Points distribution ===
Event	W	F	SF	QF	Round of 16	Round of 32	Q	Q3	Q2	Q1
Singles	280	180	110	60	30	1	18	14	10	1
Doubles	280	180	110	60	1	—N/a	—N/a	—N/a	—N/a	—N/a

=== Prize money ===
Event	W	F	SF	QF	Round of 16	Round of 32	Q3	Q2	Q1
Singles	$43,000	$21,400	$11,300	$5,900	$3,310	$1,925	$1,005	$730	$530
Doubles	$12,300	$6,400	$3,435	$1,820	$960	—N/a	—N/a	—N/a	—N/a

== Singles main draw entrants ==
=== Seeds ===
Country	Player	Rank^{1}	Seed
CZE	Karolína Plíšková	12	1
CZE	Lucie Šafářová	13	2
CZE	Barbora Strýcová	23	3
RUS	Svetlana Kuznetsova	24	4
FRA	Alizé Cornet	28	5
ROU	Irina-Camelia Begu	33	6
SUI	Belinda Bencic	34	7
ITA	Camila Giorgi	35	8

- ^{1} Rankings as of 20 April 2015.

=== Other entrants ===
The following players received wildcards into the singles main draw:

- (Czech Republic) Denisa Allertová
- (Czech Republic) Klára Koukalová
- (Slovakia) Kristína Schmiedlová

The following players received entry from the qualifying draw:

- (Belarus) Olga Govortsova
- (Czech Republic) Lucie Hradecká
- (Croatia) Ana Konjuh
- (Montenegro) Danka Kovinić

=== Withdrawals ===
Before the tournament

- (Slovakia) Magdaléna Rybáriková → replaced by Kateřina Siniaková
- (Spain) Carla Suárez Navarro → replaced by Yanina Wickmayer

== Doubles main draw entrants ==
=== Seeds ===
Country	Player	Country	Player	Rank^{1}	Seed
NED	Michaëlla Krajicek	CZE	Karolína Plíšková	69	1
UKR	Lyudmyla Kichenok	UKR	Nadiia Kichenok	137	2
RUS	Vera Dushevina	CZE	Andrea Hlaváčková	141	3
TPE	Chuang Chia-jung	CHN	Liang Chen	142	4

- ^{1} Rankings as of 20 April 2015.

=== Other entrants ===
The following pair received wildcard into the main draw:

- (Czech Republic) Kateřina Vaňková / (Czech Republic) Markéta Vondroušová

=== Withdrawals ===
Before the tournament

- (Croatia) Mirjana Lučić-Baroni (gastrointestinal illness)
