= 2010 Sparta Prague Open – Doubles =

Doubles
- 2010 Sparta Prague Open

Final
- Champions: (Russia) Ksenia Lykina (Slovenia) Maša Zec Peškirič
- Runners-up: (Czech Republic) Petra Cetkovská (Czech Republic) Eva Hrdinová
- Score: 6–3, 6–4

Events
Singles	Doubles
← 2009 ·	Sparta Prague Open	· 2011 →

Ksenia Lykina and Maša Zec Peškirič defeated Petra Cetkovská and Eva Hrdinová in the final 6–3, 6–4 to win the women's doubles title at the inaugural Sparta Prague Open.

== Seeds ==
1. (Germany) Carmen Klaschka / (United States) Riza Zalameda (semifinals)
2. (China) Lu Jingjing / (United States) Mashona Washington (first round)
3. (Russia) Elena Bovina / (Belarus) Darya Kustova (semifinals)
4. (Russia) Ksenia Lykina / (Slovenia) Maša Zec Peškirič (champions)

== Draw ==
=== Key ===
- Q = Qualifier
- WC = Wild card
- LL = Lucky loser
- Alt = Alternate
- SE = Special exempt
- PR = Protected ranking
- ITF = ITF entry
- JE = Junior exempt
- w/o = Walkover
- r = Retired
- d = Defaulted
- SR = Special ranking

First round
(Czech Republic) A Dvořáková (Russia) A Romanova	6	7
(Czech Republic) K Čechová (Czech Republic) T Martincová	2	5
4	(Russia) K Lykina (Slovenia) M Zec Peškirič	6	6
(Czech Republic) T Jankovská (Czech Republic) K Pavelková	1	0
(Czech Republic) D Schlehoferová (Czech Republic) P Šmídová	6	6
(Czech Republic) K Kramperová (Slovakia) M Pochabová	2	0
(Hungary) T Babos (Finland) E Laine	6	6
(Germany) N Luft (Czech Republic) M Tůmová	2	0
(Czech Republic) T Bekerová (Czech Republic) P Krejsová	4	0
3	(Russia) E Bovina (Belarus) D Kustova	6	6
(Czech Republic) S Dobrá (Czech Republic) T Hladíková	2	7	[6]
(Austria) S Klemenschits (France) K Mladenovic	6	6^{4}	[10]
(Czech Republic) P Cetkovská (Czech Republic) E Hrdinová	6	5	[11]
2	(China) J Lu (United States) M Washington	4	7	[9]

Quarterfinals
1	(Germany) C Klaschka (United States) R Zalameda	3	6	[10]
(Czech Republic) A Dvořáková (Russia) A Romanova	6	2	[4]
4	(Russia) K Lykina (Slovenia) M Zec Peškirič	6	7
(Czech Republic) K Kramperová (Slovakia) M Pochabová	3	6^{5}
(Hungary) T Babos (Finland) E Laine	4	1
3	(Russia) E Bovina (Belarus) D Kustova	6	6
(Austria) S Klemenschits (France) K Mladenovic	1	4
(Czech Republic) P Cetkovská (Czech Republic) E Hrdinová	6	6

Semifinals
1	(Germany) C Klaschka (United States) R Zalameda	4	2
4	(Russia) K Lykina (Slovenia) M Zec Peškirič	6	6
3	(Russia) E Bovina (Belarus) D Kustova	4	4
(Czech Republic) P Cetkovská (Czech Republic) E Hrdinová	6	6

Final
4	(Russia) K Lykina (Slovenia) M Zec Peškirič	6	6
(Czech Republic) P Cetkovská (Czech Republic) E Hrdinová	3	4
