= 2010 Sparta Prague Open – Singles =

Singles
- 2010 Sparta Prague Open

Final
- Champion: (Czech Republic) Lucie Hradecká
- Runner-up: (Croatia) Ajla Tomljanović
- Score: 6–1, 7–6^{(7–4)}

Details
- Draw: 32
- Seeds: 8

Events
Singles	Doubles
← 2009 ·	Sparta Prague Open	· 2011 →

Number one seed Lucie Hradecká defeated unseeded Ajla Tomljanović 6–1, 7–6^{(7–4)} in the final to win the women's singles title at the inaugural Sparta Prague Open.

== Seeds ==
1. (Czech Republic) Lucie Hradecká (champion)
2. (Czech Republic) Sandra Záhlavová (quarterfinals)
3. (Australia) Jelena Dokić (quarterfinals)
4. (Slovenia) Maša Zec Peškirič (quarterfinals)
5. (Russia) Ksenia Pervak (semifinals)
6. (Belarus) Darya Kustova (second round)
7. (Italy) Anna Floris (first round)
8. (Czech Republic) Andrea Hlaváčková (first round)

== Draw ==
=== Key ===
- Q = Qualifier
- WC = Wild card
- LL = Lucky loser
- Alt = Alternate
- SE = Special exempt
- PR = Protected ranking
- ITF = ITF entry
- JE = Junior exempt
- w/o = Walkover
- r = Retired
- d = Defaulted
- SR = Special ranking

=== Finals ===
Semifinals
1	(Czech Republic) Lucie Hradecká	6	6
(Italy) Corinna Dentoni	3	3
(Croatia) Ajla Tomljanović	6	2	6
5	(Russia) Ksenia Pervak	3	6	3

Final
1	(Czech Republic) Lucie Hradecká	6	7
(Croatia) Ajla Tomljanović	1	6^{4}

=== Top half ===
First round
1	(Czech Republic) L Hradecká	1	6	6
(Czech Republic) Z Ondrášková	6	3	3
(France) S Vongsouthi	6	3	1
LL	(Netherlands) D Harmsen	3	6	6
WC	(Czech Republic) P Cetkovská	7	3	7
(Germany) J Schruff	5	6	6^{5}
(Germany) M Barthel	6	3	7
7	(Italy) A Floris	3	6	5
3	(Australia) J Dokić	2	6	6
Q	(China) J Lu	6	4	4
LL	(Germany) L-M Hoffmann	2	3
Q	(Finland) E Laine	6	6
(Italy) C Dentoni	6	6
(Russia) K Lykina	2	3
Q	(Slovakia) M Hončová	3	4
6	(Belarus) D Kustova	6	6

Second round
1	(Czech Republic) L Hradecká	6	6
LL	(Netherlands) D Harmsen	4	3
WC	(Czech Republic) P Cetkovská	6	6
(Germany) M Barthel	4	2
3	(Australia) J Dokić	4	7	7
Q	(Finland) E Laine	6	6^{5}	6^{5}
(Italy) C Dentoni	7	6
6	(Belarus) D Kustova	6^{5}	4

Quarterfinals
1	(Czech Republic) L Hradecká	6	6^{5}	6
WC	(Czech Republic) P Cetkovská	2	7	3
3	(Australia) J Dokić	5	3
(Italy) C Dentoni	7	6

Semifinals
1	(Czech Republic) L Hradecká	6	6
(Italy) C Dentoni	3	3

=== Bottom half ===
First round
8	(Czech Republic) A Hlaváčková	3	5
Q	(Slovakia) L Juríková	6	7
(Croatia) A Tomljanović	6	6
(Czech Republic) E Hrdinová	2	3
(Russia) E Bovina	5	6^{3}
JE	(Hungary) T Babos	7	7
WC	(Czech Republic) T Jankovská	2	1
4	(Slovenia) M Zec Peškirič	6	6
5	(Russia) K Pervak	7	6
(Germany) C Klaschka	5	3
WC	(Russia) A Romanova	3	0
LL	(Germany) S-R Sekulic	6	6
(France) K Mladenovic	7	6
WC	(Czech Republic) K Kramperová	6^{4}	0
(Slovakia) M Pochabová	1	4
2	(Czech Republic) S Záhlavová	6	6

Second round
Q	(Slovakia) L Juríková	2	2
(Croatia) A Tomljanović	6	6
JE	(Hungary) T Babos	1	7	5
4	(Slovenia) M Zec Peškirič	6	6^{6}	7
5	(Russia) K Pervak	6	6
LL	(Germany) S-R Sekulic	1	2
(France) K Mladenovic	1	6	4
2	(Czech Republic) S Záhlavová	6	4	6

Quarterfinals
(Croatia) A Tomljanović	7	6
4	(Slovenia) M Zec Peškirič	6^{4}	2
5	(Russia) K Pervak	7	6
2	(Czech Republic) S Záhlavová	6^{3}	0

Semifinals
(Croatia) A Tomljanović	6	2	6
5	(Russia) K Pervak	3	6	3
