= 2011 Sparta Prague Open – Doubles =

Doubles
- 2011 Sparta Prague Open

Final
- Champions: (Czech Republic) Petra Cetkovská (Netherlands) Michaëlla Krajicek
- Runners-up: (United States) Lindsay Lee-Waters (United States) Megan Moulton-Levy
- Score: 6–2, 6–1

Events
Singles	Doubles
← 2010 ·	Sparta Prague Open	· 2012 →

Ksenia Lykina and Maša Zec Peškirič were the defending champions, having won the event in 2010, but both players chose not to participate in 2011.

Petra Cetkovská and Michaëlla Krajicek won the tournament, defeating Lindsay Lee-Waters and Megan Moulton-Levy in the final, 6–2, 6–1.

== Seeds ==
1. (United States) ~~Jill Craybas~~ / (Croatia) ~~Petra Martić~~ (withdrew)
2. (Slovakia) Magdaléna Rybáriková / (Czech Republic) Klára Zakopalová (semifinals)
3. (Czech Republic) Petra Cetkovská / (Netherlands) Michaëlla Krajicek (champions)
4. (United States) Lindsay Lee-Waters / (United States) Megan Moulton-Levy (final)

== Draw ==
=== Key ===
- Q = Qualifier
- WC = Wild card
- LL = Lucky loser
- Alt = Alternate
- SE = Special exempt
- PR = Protected ranking
- ITF = ITF entry
- JE = Junior exempt
- w/o = Walkover
- r = Retired
- d = Defaulted
- SR = Special ranking

First round
Alt	(United States) M Brengle (Poland) K Piter	6	5	[10]
(Czech Republic) Iveta Gerlová (Czech Republic) Lucie Kriegsmannová	4	7	[6]
(China) S Sun (China) Y Xu	6	6
WC	(Czech Republic) D Allertová (Czech Republic) Kr Plíšková	3	2
3	(Czech Republic) P Cetkovská (Netherlands) M Krajicek	6	6
WC	(Czech Republic) M Borecká (Czech Republic) M Kubičíková	3	3
(United Kingdom) A Keothavong (Australia) J Moore	6	6
(Russia) K Pervak (Ukraine) L Tsurenko	1	3
(Ukraine) L Kichenok (Ukraine) N Kichenok	3	6	[10]
WC	(Czech Republic) T Jankovská (Czech Republic) K Kopřivová	6	1	[7]
(Poland) M Domachowska (Czech Republic) E Hrdinová	6^{5}	4
4	(United States) L Lee-Waters (United States) M Moulton-Levy	7^{7}	6
(Czech Republic) E Birnerová (Czech Republic) H Birnerová	2	1
(Romania) S Cîrstea (Colombia) M Duque	6	6
(United States) A Rolle (United States) M Washington	5	1
2	(Slovakia) M Rybáriková (Czech Republic) K Zakopalová	7	6

Quarterfinals
Alt	(United States) M Brengle (Poland) K Piter	3	6	[4]
(China) S Sun (China) Y Xu	6	1	[10]
3	(Czech Republic) P Cetkovská (Netherlands) M Krajicek	6	6
(United Kingdom) A Keothavong (Australia) J Moore	3	1
(Ukraine) L Kichenok (Ukraine) N Kichenok	3	6	[5]
4	(United States) L Lee-Waters (United States) M Moulton-Levy	6	3	[10]
(Romania) S Cîrstea (Colombia) M Duque
2	(Slovakia) M Rybáriková (Czech Republic) K Zakopalová	w/o

Semifinals
(China) S Sun (China) Y Xu	4	2
3	(Czech Republic) P Cetkovská (Netherlands) M Krajicek	6	6
4	(United States) L Lee-Waters (United States) M Moulton-Levy	6	1	[12]
2	(Slovakia) M Rybáriková (Czech Republic) K Zakopalová	4	6	[10]

Final
3	(Czech Republic) P Cetkovská (Netherlands) M Krajicek	6	6
4	(United States) L Lee-Waters (United States) M Moulton-Levy	2	1
