= 2012 Sparta Prague Open =

- Date: 14–20 May
- Edition: 3rd
- Surface: Clay
- Location: Prague; Czech Republic
- Venue: TK Sparta Prague

Champions

Singles
- (Czech Republic) Lucie Šafářová

Doubles
- (France) Alizé Cornet / (France) Virginie Razzano
- Sparta Prague Open

The 2012 Sparta Prague Open was a professional tennis tournament played on clay courts. It was the third edition of the tournament which was part of the 2012 ITF Women's Circuit. It took place at the TK Sparta Prague in Prague, Czech Republic, from 14 to 20 May 2012.

== WTA entrants ==
=== Seeds ===
Country	Player	Rank^{1}	Seed
CZE	Lucie Šafářová	23	1
CZE	Klára Zakopalová	44	2
CZE	Barbora Záhlavová-Strýcová	56	3
HUN	Tímea Babos	64	4
GRE	Eleni Daniilidou	65	5
GBR	Elena Baltacha	67	6
JPN	Kimiko Date-Krumm	74	7
JPN	Ayumi Morita	80	8

- ^{1} Rankings as of 7 May 2012

=== Other entrants ===
The following players received wildcards into the singles main draw:

- (Czech Republic) Denisa Allertová
- (Slovakia) Jana Čepelová
- (Czech Republic) Martina Přádová
- (Czech Republic) Tereza Smitková

The following players received entry from the qualifying draw:

- (Germany) Annika Beck
- (Puerto Rico) Monica Puig
- (Latvia) Anastasija Sevastova
- (China) Zhang Shuai

The following players received entry into the singles main draw as lucky losers:

- (Japan) Rika Fujiwara
- (Czech Republic) Sandra Záhlavová

== Champions ==
=== Singles ===
- (Czech Republic) Lucie Šafářová def. (Czech Republic) Klára Zakopalová 6–3, 7–5

=== Doubles ===
- (France) Alizé Cornet / (France) Virginie Razzano def. (Uzbekistan) Akgul Amanmuradova / (Australia) Casey Dellacqua 6–2, 6–3
