= 2011 Sparta Prague Open =

- Date: 9–15 May
- Edition: 2nd
- Category: ITF Women's Circuit
- Prize money: $100,000
- Surface: Clay
- Location: Prague, Czech Republic
- Venue: TK Sparta Prague

Champions

Singles
- (Slovakia) Magdaléna Rybáriková

Doubles
- (Czech Republic) Petra Cetkovská / (Netherlands) Michaëlla Krajicek
- Sparta Prague Open

The 2011 Sparta Prague Open was a professional tennis tournament played on clay courts. It was part of the 2011 ITF Women's Circuit, offering a total of $100,000 in prize money. It took place at the TK Sparta Prague in Bubeneč, Prague, Czech Republic, from 9 to 15 May 2011.

== Singles entrants ==
=== Seeds ===
Country	Player	Rank^{1}	Seed
CZE	Petra Kvitová	19	1
CZE	Klára Zakopalová	34	2
CZE	Lucie Hradecká	52	3
SVK	Magdaléna Rybáriková	72	4
FRA	Mathilde Johansson	73	5
IND	Sania Mirza	77	6
RUS	Ksenia Pervak	84	7
CZE	Zuzana Ondrášková	87	8

- Rankings as of 2 May 2011

=== Other entrants ===
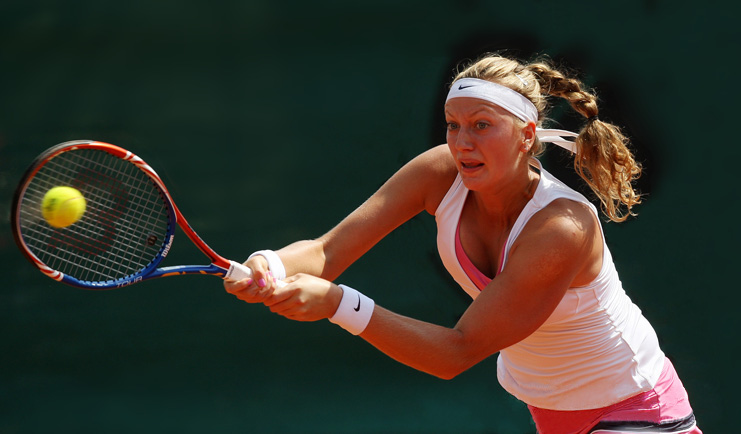
The runner-up of the 2011 Sparta Prague Open, Petra Kvitová

The following players received wildcards into the singles main draw:

- (Slovakia) Jana Čepelová
- (Germany) Gesa Focke
- (Czech Republic) Kristýna Plíšková
- (Czech Republic) Martina Přádová

The following players received entry from the qualifying draw:

- (Poland) Marta Domachowska
- (Colombia) Mariana Duque
- (Serbia) Aleksandra Krunić
- (United States) Ahsha Rolle

The following players received entry into the singles main draw as lucky losers:

- (Czech Republic) Denisa Allertová
- (Poland) Katarzyna Piter

== Finals ==
=== Singles ===
- (Slovakia) Magdaléna Rybáriková defeated (Czech Republic) Petra Kvitová 6–3, 6–4

=== Doubles ===
- (Czech Republic) Petra Cetkovská / (Netherlands) Michaëlla Krajicek defeated (United States) Lindsay Lee-Waters / (United States) Megan Moulton-Levy 6–2, 6–1
