= 2017 J&T Banka Prague Open =

- Date: 1–6 May
- Edition: 8th
- Category: WTA International
- Draw: 32S / 16D
- Prize money: $250,000
- Surface: Clay
- Location: Prague, Czech Republic
- Venue: TK Sparta Prague

Champions

Singles
- (Germany) Mona Barthel

Doubles
- (Germany) Anna-Lena Grönefeld / (Czech Republic) Květa Peschke
- J&T Banka Prague Open

The 2017 J&T Banka Prague Open was a professional tennis tournaments played on outdoor clay courts. It was the 8th edition of the tournament, and its second as part of the International category of the 2017 WTA Tour. It took place at the TK Sparta Prague in Prague, Czech Republic, from 1 May until 6 May 2017.

== Finals ==
=== Singles ===
- (Germany) Mona Barthel defeated (Czech Republic) Kristýna Plíšková 2–6, 7–5, 6–2

=== Doubles ===
- (Germany) Anna-Lena Grönefeld / (Czech Republic) Květa Peschke defeated (Czech Republic) Lucie Hradecká / (Czech Republic) Kateřina Siniaková 6–4, 7–6^{(7–3)}

== Points distribution ==
| Event | W | F | SF | QF | Round of 16 | Round of 32 | Q | Q3 | Q2 | Q1 |
| Singles | 280 | 180 | 110 | 60 | 30 | 1 | 18 | 14 | 10 | 1 |
| Doubles | 280 | 180 | 110 | 60 | 1 | —N/a | —N/a | —N/a | —N/a | —N/a |

== Singles main draw entrants ==
=== Seeds ===
| Country | Player | Rank^{1} | Seed |
|---|---|---|---|
| CZE | Karolína Plíšková | 3 | 1 |
| DEN | Caroline Wozniacki | 11 | 2 |
| CZE | Barbora Strýcová | 17 | 3 |
| AUS | Samantha Stosur | 18 | 4 |
| CZE | Lucie Šafářová | 28 | 5 |
| CHN | Zhang Shuai | 32 | 6 |
| CRO | Ana Konjuh | 34 | 7 |
| CZE | Kateřina Siniaková | 38 | 8 |

- ^{1} Rankings as of 24 April 2017.

=== Other entrants ===
The following players received wildcards into the singles main draw:

- (Slovakia) Jana Čepelová
- (Serbia) Jelena Janković
- (Czech Republic) Markéta Vondroušová

The following players received entry from the qualifying draw:

- (Germany) Mona Barthel
- (Brazil) Beatriz Haddad Maia
- (Czech Republic) Lucie Hradecká
- (Russia) Natalia Vikhlyantseva

=== Withdrawals ===
Before the tournament

- (Luxembourg) Mandy Minella → replaced by (Italy) Camila Giorgi
- (Japan) Naomi Osaka → replaced by (Russia) Evgeniya Rodina
- (United States) Louisa Chirico → replaced by (Montenegro) Danka Kovinić

During the tournament

- (Czech Republic) Lucie Šafářová

== Doubles main draw entrants ==
=== Seeds ===
| Country | Player | Country | Player | Rank^{1} | Seed |
|---|---|---|---|---|---|
| CZE | Lucie Hradecká | CZE | Kateřina Siniaková | 32 | 1 |
| GER | Anna-Lena Grönefeld | CZE | Květa Peschke | 69 | 2 |
| USA | Raquel Atawo | CZE | Renata Voráčová | 76 | 3 |
| USA | Asia Muhammad | POL | Alicja Rosolska | 87 | 4 |

- ^{1} Rankings as of 24 April 2017.

=== Other entrants ===
The following pairs received wildcards into the main draw:

- (Slovakia) Tereza Mihalíková / (Slovakia) Chantal Škamlová
- (Czech Republic) Tereza Smitková / (Czech Republic) Anastasia Zarycká
