= Infond Open =

ITF Women's Tour
- Event name: Maribor
- Location: Maribor, Slovenia
- Venue: ŽTK Maribor
- Category: ITF Women's Circuit
- Surface: Clay
- Draw: 32S/32Q/16D
- Prize money: $15,000

The Infond Open was a tournament for professional female tennis players played on clay courts. The event was classified as a $15,000 ITF Women's Circuit tournament and was held in Maribor, Slovenia, from 1996 to 2018.

The tournament was known as the Maribor Open until 2000, then in 2001–2002 as the IGM Stavbar Open, in 2003 as the Maribor Ladies Open and has held its current name, Infond Open, since 2004. The events in 2008 and 2010 each had a prize fund totalling $50,000.

== Past finals ==
=== Singles ===
Year	Champion	Runner-up	Score
2018	(France) Irina Ramialison	(China) Wang Xinyu	6–2, 6–7^{(3–7)}, 7–5
2017	(Slovenia) Kaja Juvan	(Slovenia) Nina Potočnik	6–4, 6–2
2016	(Ukraine) Marianna Zakarlyuk	(Slovenia) Nina Potočnik	3–6, 7–5, 6–3
2015	(Greece) Maria Sakkari	(Sweden) Rebecca Peterson	3–6, 6–2, 6–2
2014	(Czech Republic) Kateřina Siniaková	(Austria) Yvonne Neuwirth	6–1, 7–5
2013	(Slovenia) Polona Hercog	(Croatia) Ana Konjuh	3–6, 6–3, 6–3
2012	(Germany) Anna-Lena Friedsam	(Brazil) Teliana Pereira	2–6, 7–6^{(7–1)}, 6–2
2011	(Slovenia) Nastja Kolar	(Slovenia) Maša Zec Peškirič	7–5, 6–4
2010	(China) Zhang Shuai	(Spain) Laura Pous Tió	6–3, 3–6, 6–3
2009	(Romania) Simona Halep	(Hungary) Katalin Marosi	6–4, 6–2
2008	(Slovenia) Maša Zec Peškirič	(Slovakia) Kristína Kučová	6–2, 7–6^{(8–6)}
2007	(Slovenia) Polona Hercog	(Czech Republic) Tereza Hladíková	4–6, 6–1, 4–1 ret.
2006	(Slovenia) Andreja Klepač	(Bulgaria) Dia Evtimova	6–4, 2–6, 6–3
2005	(Sweden) Mari Andersson	(Bulgaria) Dia Evtimova	7–5, 6–3
2004	(Slovenia) Maša Zec Peškirič	(Slovenia) Andreja Klepač	6–2, 7–5
2003	(Croatia) Nika Ožegović	(Czech Republic) Lucie Kriegsmannová	6–0, 6–1
2002	(Italy) Mara Santangelo	(Romania) Edina Gallovits	6–2, 6–3
2001	(Slovakia) Ľubomíra Kurhajcová	(Poland) Katarzyna Strączy	3–6, 7–5, 6–1
2000	(Czech Republic) Klára Koukalová	(Germany) Angelika Rösch	7–5, 6–4
1999	(Slovakia) Stanislava Hrozenská	(Bosnia and Herzegovina) Mervana Jugić-Salkić	4–6, 6–4, 6–2
1998	(Hungary) Adrienn Hegedűs	(Hungary) Katalin Miskolczi	7–5, 6–2
1997	(Slovenia) Tina Pisnik	(Austria) Nina Schwarz	6–0, 6–2
1996	(Czech Republic) Petra Kučová	(Czech Republic) Hana Šromová	6–4, 4–6, 7–6

=== Doubles ===
Year	Champions	Runners-up	Score
2018	(Czech Republic) Michaela Bayerlová (Kosovo) Adrijana Lekaj	(France) Irina Ramialison (France) Constance Sibille	7–6^{(7–2)}, 7–5
2017	(Croatia) Mia Jurašić (Italy) Giulia Pairone	(Slovakia) Jana Jablonovská (Austria) Marlies Szupper	6–3, 4–6, [10–7]
2016	(Slovenia) Nastja Kolar (United Kingdom) Francesca Stephenson	(Slovenia) Polona Reberšak (Romania) Gabriela Talabă	5–7, 6–0, [10–3]
2015	(Georgia (country)) Ekaterine Gorgodze (Slovenia) Nastja Kolar	(Czech Republic) Petra Krejsová (Czech Republic) Kateřina Vaňková	6–2, 6–4
2014	(Czech Republic) Barbora Krejčíková (Czech Republic) Kateřina Siniaková	(Netherlands) Cindy Burger (Chile) Daniela Seguel	6–0, 6–1
2013	(Poland) Paula Kania (Poland) Magda Linette	(Argentina) Mailen Auroux (Argentina) María Irigoyen	6–3, 6–0
2012	(Romania) Elena Bogdan (Germany) Kathrin Wörle	(Denmark) Karen Barbat (Germany) Anna-Lena Friedsam	6–2, 2–6, [10–5]
2011	(Colombia) Karen Castiblanco (Venezuela) Adriana Pérez	(Croatia) Ani Mijačika (Croatia) Ana Vrljić	6–3, 7–6^{(11–9)}
2010	(Slovenia) Andreja Klepač (Slovenia) Tadeja Majerič	(Russia) Alexandra Panova (Russia) Ksenia Pervak	6–3, 7–6^{(8–6)}
2009	(Croatia) Ani Mijačika (Croatia) Ana Vrljić	(Croatia) Maria Abramović (Slovakia) Katarína Kachlíková	6–2, 6–3
2008	(Germany) Carmen Klaschka (Germany) Andrea Petkovic	(Hungary) Kira Nagy (Belarus) Anastasiya Yakimova	6–0, 2–6, [10–3]
2007	(Croatia) Darija Jurak (Czech Republic) Michaela Paštiková	(Serbia) Ana Jovanović (Germany) Laura Siegemund	1–6, 6–4, 6–1
2006	(Romania) Diana Enache (Romania) Antonia Xenia Tout	(Bulgaria) Dia Evtimova (Slovenia) Maša Zec Peškirič	walkover
2005	(Sweden) Mari Andersson (Sweden) Kristina Andlovic	(Hungary) Katalin Marosi (Brazil) Marina Tavares	7–6^{(7–2)}, 6–3
2004	(Slovenia) Alja Zec Peškirič (Slovenia) Maša Zec Peškirič	(Czech Republic) Lucie Kriegsmannová (Czech Republic) Zuzana Zálabská	6–3, 6–3
2003	(Czech Republic) Iveta Gerlová (Slovakia) Zuzana Zemenová	(Czech Republic) Lucie Kriegsmannová (Czech Republic) Milena Nekvapilová	6–0, 6–1
2002	(Slovenia) Tina Hergold (Hungary) Eszter Molnár	(Ukraine) Alona Bondarenko (Russia) Olga Kalyuzhnaya	6–1, 6–1
2001	(Czech Republic) Olga Blahotová (Czech Republic) Gabriela Navrátilová	(Serbia and Montenegro) Katarina Mišić (Spain) Mariam Ramon Climent	6–2, 6–2
2000	(Germany) Angelika Rösch (Germany) Jasmin Wöhr	(Argentina) Vanessa Krauth (Switzerland) Aliénor Tricerri	6–4, 4–6, 7–6^{(7–1)}
1999	(Czech Republic) Olga Blahotová (Czech Republic) Hana Šromová	(Slovakia) Andrea Šebová (Slovakia) Silvia Uríčková	6–4, 6–3
1998	(Czech Republic) Linda Faltýnková (Czech Republic) Petra Plačková	(Austria) Julia Adlbrecht (Austria) Stefanie Haidner	6–2, 6–1
1997	(Slovenia) Tina Hergold (Slovenia) Tina Pisnik	(Slovenia) Nives Ćulum (Slovenia) Tina Hojnik	6–3, 6–2
1996	(Romania) Alida Gallovits (Romania) Alice Pirsu	(Hungary) Kira Nagy (Hungary) Andrea Noszály	6–4, 7–5
