= 2017 J&T Banka Prague Open – Doubles =

Doubles
- 2017 J&T Banka Prague Open

Final
- Champions: (Germany) Anna-Lena Grönefeld (Czech Republic) Květa Peschke
- Runners-up: (Czech Republic) Lucie Hradecká (Czech Republic) Kateřina Siniaková
- Score: 6–4, 7–6^{(7–3)}

Details
- Draw: 16
- Seeds: 4

Events
Singles	Doubles
- J&T Banka Prague Open

Margarita Gasparyan and Andrea Hlaváčková were the defending champions, but Gasparyan chose not to participate this year and Hlaváčková chose to compete in Rabat instead.

Anna-Lena Grönefeld and Květa Peschke won the title, defeating Lucie Hradecká and Kateřina Siniaková in the final, 6–4, 7–6^{(7–3)}.

== Seeds ==
1. (Czech Republic) Lucie Hradecká / (Czech Republic) Kateřina Siniaková (final)
2. (Germany) Anna-Lena Grönefeld / (Czech Republic) Květa Peschke (champions)
3. (United States) Raquel Atawo / (Czech Republic) Renata Voráčová (semifinals)
4. (United States) Asia Muhammad / (Poland) Alicja Rosolska (semifinals)

== Draw ==
Key

- Q = Qualifier
- WC = Wild card
- LL = Lucky loser
- Alt = Alternate
- ITF = ITF entry
- PR = Protected ranking
- SR = Special ranking
- SE = Special exempt
- JE = Junior exempt
- JR = Junior Accelerator Programme entrant
- CO = College Accelerator Programme entrant
- NG = Next Gen Accelerator Program entrant
- w/o = Walkover
- r = Retired
- d = Defaulted

=== Draw ===
First round
1	(Czech Republic) L Hradecká (Czech Republic) K Siniaková	6	6
(Russia) N Dzalamidze (Russia) V Kudermetova	4	3
(Germany) A Beck (Czech Republic) L Kunčíková	6	7^{7}
WC	(Czech Republic) T Smitková (Czech Republic) A Zarycká	2	6^{3}
3	(United States) R Atawo (Czech Republic) R Voráčová	6	6^{3}	[10]
(Chinese Taipei) C-j Chuang (China) C Liang	3	7^{7}	[2]
(Switzerland) X Knoll (Netherlands) D Schuurs	6	6^{2}	[10]
(Montenegro) D Kovinić (Poland) M Linette	4	7^{7}	[4]
WC	(Slovakia) T Mihalíková (Slovakia) C Škamlová	3	6	[10]
(Chinese Taipei) K-c Chang (Russia) E Rodina	6	4	[6]
(Switzerland) V Golubic (Czech Republic) Kr Plíšková	6	4	[6]
4	(United States) A Muhammad (Poland) A Rosolska	4	6	[10]
(Argentina) M Irigoyen (Poland) P Kania	7	2	[11]
(Czech Republic) E Hrdinová (Ukraine) N Kichenok	5	6	[9]
(Russia) A Kalinskaya (Russia) N Vikhlyantseva	1	5
2	(Germany) A-L Grönefeld (Czech Republic) K Peschke	6	7

Quarterfinals
1	(Czech Republic) L Hradecká (Czech Republic) K Siniaková	6	6
(Germany) A Beck (Czech Republic) L Kunčíková	1	3
3	(United States) R Atawo (Czech Republic) R Voráčová	4	7	[10]
(Switzerland) X Knoll (Netherlands) D Schuurs	6	5	[7]
WC	(Slovakia) T Mihalíková (Slovakia) C Škamlová	5	3
4	(United States) A Muhammad (Poland) A Rosolska	7	6
(Argentina) M Irigoyen (Poland) P Kania	7^{9}	2	[7]
2	(Germany) A-L Grönefeld (Czech Republic) K Peschke	6^{7}	6	[10]

Semifinals
1	(Czech Republic) L Hradecká (Czech Republic) K Siniaková	6	6
3	(United States) R Atawo (Czech Republic) R Voráčová	4	4
4	(United States) A Muhammad (Poland) A Rosolska	4	2
2	(Germany) A-L Grönefeld (Czech Republic) K Peschke	6	6

Final
1	(Czech Republic) L Hradecká (Czech Republic) K Siniaková	4	6^{3}
2	(Germany) A-L Grönefeld (Czech Republic) K Peschke	6	7^{7}
