= 2012 Sparta Prague Open – Doubles =

Doubles
- 2012 Sparta Prague Open

Final
- Champions: (France) Alizé Cornet (France) Virginie Razzano
- Runners-up: (Uzbekistan) Akgul Amanmuradova (Australia) Casey Dellacqua
- Score: 6–2, 6–3

Events
Singles	Doubles
← 2011 ·	Sparta Prague Open	· 2013 →

Petra Cetkovská and Michaëlla Krajicek were the defending champions, but both chose not to participate.

Alizé Cornet and Virginie Razzano won the title defeating Akgul Amanmuradova and Casey Dellacqua in the final 6–2, 6–3.

== Seeds ==
1. (Czech Republic) Klára Zakopalová / (China) Zhang Shuai (semifinals)
2. (Greece) Eleni Daniilidou / (Japan) Rika Fujiwara (quarterfinals)
3. (Uzbekistan) Akgul Amanmuradova / (Australia) Casey Dellacqua (final)
4. (Czech Republic) Karolína Plíšková / (Czech Republic) Kristýna Plíšková (first round)

== Draw ==
=== Key ===
- Q = Qualifier
- WC = Wild card
- LL = Lucky loser
- Alt = Alternate
- SE = Special exempt
- PR = Protected ranking
- ITF = ITF entry
- JE = Junior exempt
- w/o = Walkover
- r = Retired
- d = Defaulted
- SR = Special ranking

=== Draw ===
First round
1	(Czech Republic) K Zakopalová (China) S Zhang	6	6
WC	(Czech Republic) N Horáková (Czech Republic) T Jankovská	0	2
(Czech Republic) M Kubičíková (Czech Republic) T Smitková	6	4	[11]
(Latvia) L Dekmeijere (Russia) M Kondratieva	4	6	[9]
3	(Uzbekistan) A Amanmuradova (Australia) C Dellacqua	6	6
WC	(Czech Republic) P Kubinová (Czech Republic) A Poletínová	1	3
(Spain) L Arruabarrena Vecino (Puerto Rico) M Puig	4	3
(United States) L Lee-Waters (United States) M Moulton-Levy	6	6
(Czech Republic) N Fraňková (Czech Republic) E Hrdinová	6	3	[10]
(Hungary) R-L Jani (United States) C Scholl	4	6	[8]
(France) A Cornet (France) V Razzano	6	4	[10]
4	(Czech Republic) Ka Plíšková (Czech Republic) Kr Plíšková	2	6	[8]
WC	(Czech Republic) J Malečková (Czech Republic) M Přádová	4	7^{8}	[5]
(Colombia) C Castaño (Hungary) K Marosi	6	6^{6}	[10]
(Czech Republic) E Birnerová (Czech Republic) H Birnerová	5	2
2	(Greece) E Daniilidou (Japan) R Fujiwara	7	6

Quarterfinals
1	(Czech Republic) K Zakopalová (China) S Zhang	6	6
(Czech Republic) M Kubičíková (Czech Republic) T Smitková	1	4
3	(Uzbekistan) A Amanmuradova (Australia) C Dellacqua	7	2	[10]
(United States) L Lee-Waters (United States) M Moulton-Levy	5	6	[8]
(Czech Republic) N Fraňková (Czech Republic) E Hrdinová	2	1
(France) A Cornet (France) V Razzano	6	6
(Colombia) C Castaño (Hungary) K Marosi	6	1	[10]
2	(Greece) E Daniilidou (Japan) R Fujiwara	3	6	[8]

Semifinals
1	(Czech Republic) K Zakopalová (China) S Zhang	3	2
3	(Uzbekistan) A Amanmuradova (Australia) C Dellacqua	6	6
(France) A Cornet (France) V Razzano	6	7^{7}
(Colombia) C Castaño (Hungary) K Marosi	1	6^{3}

Finals
3	(Uzbekistan) A Amanmuradova (Australia) C Dellacqua	2	3
(France) A Cornet (France) V Razzano	6	6
