= 2011 Sparta Prague Open – Singles =

Singles
- 2011 Sparta Prague Open

Final
- Champion: (Slovakia) Magdaléna Rybáriková
- Runner-up: (Czech Republic) Petra Kvitová
- Score: 6–3, 6–4

Details
- Draw: 32
- Seeds: 8

Events
Singles	Doubles
← 2010 ·	Sparta Prague Open	· 2012 →

Lucie Hradecká was the defending champion, but withdrew from the event.

Magdaléna Rybáriková won the tournament, defeating Petra Kvitová in the final, 6–3, 6–4.

== Seeds ==
1. (Czech Republic) Petra Kvitová (final)
2. (Czech Republic) Klára Zakopalová (quarterfinals)
3. (Czech Republic) ~~Lucie Hradecká~~ (withdrew)
4. (Slovakia) Magdaléna Rybáriková (champion)
5. (France) Mathilde Johansson (quarterfinals)
6. (India) Sania Mirza (first round; retired)
7. (Russia) Ksenia Pervak (quarterfinals)
8. (Czech Republic) Zuzana Ondrášková (first round)

== Draw ==
=== Key ===
- Q = Qualifier
- WC = Wild card
- LL = Lucky loser
- Alt = Alternate
- SE = Special exempt
- PR = Protected ranking
- ITF = ITF entry
- JE = Junior exempt
- w/o = Walkover
- r = Retired
- d = Defaulted
- SR = Special ranking

=== Finals ===
Semifinals
1	(Czech Republic) Petra Kvitová	6	6
Q	(Serbia) Aleksandra Krunić	4	2
4	(Slovakia) Magdaléna Rybáriková	0	7^{7}	6
(Czech Republic) Petra Cetkovská	6	6^{2}	0

Final
1	(Czech Republic) Petra Kvitová	3	4
4	(Slovakia) Magdaléna Rybáriková	6	6

=== Top half ===
First round
1	(Czech Republic) P Kvitová	7^{7}	6
(United Kingdom) A Keothavong	6^{1}	3
(United Kingdom) E Baltacha	6	6
JE	(Russia) D Gavrilova	2	4
(Netherlands) M Krajicek	3	6	1
(Croatia) P Martić	6	4	6
WC	(Czech Republic) Kr Plíšková	4	0
5	(France) M Johansson	6	6
LL	(Czech Republic) D Allertová	7	6
(Czech Republic) S Záhlavová	5	2
(Germany) K Wörle	5	3
(Ukraine) L Tsurenko	7	6
(Luxembourg) A Kremer	2	7	4
Q	(Colombia) M Duque	6	5	6
Q	(Serbia) A Krunić	6	0
6	(India) S Mirza	4	0^{r}

Second round
1	(Czech Republic) P Kvitová	6	6
(United Kingdom) E Baltacha	2	3
(Croatia) P Martić	3	1
5	(France) M Johansson	6	6
LL	(Czech Republic) D Allertová	6	6
(Ukraine) L Tsurenko	2	2
Q	(Colombia) M Duque	3	6	6^{2}
Q	(Serbia) A Krunić	6	0	7^{7}

Quarterfinals
1	(Czech Republic) P Kvitová	6	6
5	(France) M Johansson	1	1
LL	(Czech Republic) D Allertová	4	0
Q	(Serbia) A Krunić	6	6

Semifinals
1	(Czech Republic) P Kvitová	6	6
Q	(Serbia) A Krunić	4	2

=== Bottom half ===
First round
7	(Russia) K Pervak	2	6	6
(Czech Republic) A Hlaváčková	6	2	2
WC	(Czech Republic) M Přádová	6	6
WC	(Germany) G Focke	2	0
PR	(Ukraine) V Kutuzova	7	4	3
LL	(Poland) K Piter	5	6	6
Q	(Poland) M Domachowska	7	5	3
4	(Slovakia) M Rybáriková	5	7	6
8	(Czech Republic) Z Ondrášková	0	6	0
(Czech Republic) P Cetkovská	6	4	6
(United States) M Brengle	4	4
(Czech Republic) E Birnerová	6	6
WC	(Slovakia) J Čepelová	6^{5}	3
(Romania) S Cîrstea	7^{7}	6
Q	(United States) A Rolle	5	5
2	(Czech Republic) K Zakopalová	7	7

Second round
7	(Russia) K Pervak	6	6
WC	(Czech Republic) M Přádová	1	0
LL	(Poland) K Piter	3	2
4	(Slovakia) M Rybáriková	6	6
(Czech Republic) P Cetkovská	2	6	6
(Czech Republic) E Birnerová	6	4	1
(Romania) S Cîrstea	1	1^{r}
2	(Czech Republic) K Zakopalová	6	2

Quarterfinals
7	(Russia) K Pervak	6^{5}	2
4	(Slovakia) M Rybáriková	7^{7}	6
(Czech Republic) P Cetkovská	5	6	7
2	(Czech Republic) K Zakopalová	7	3	5

Semifinals
4	(Slovakia) M Rybáriková	0	7^{7}	6
(Czech Republic) P Cetkovská	6	6^{2}	0
