= 2015 J&T Banka Prague Open – Singles =

Singles
- 2015 J&T Banka Prague Open

Final
- Champion: (Czech Republic) Karolína Plíšková
- Runner-up: (Czech Republic) Lucie Hradecká
- Score: 4–6, 7–5, 6–3

Details
- Draw: 32
- Seeds: 8

Events
Singles	Doubles
- J&T Banka Prague Open

Heather Watson was the defending champion, but lost to Polona Hercog in the first round.

First-seeded Karolína Plíšková won the title, defeating Lucie Hradecká in the final, 4–6, 7–5, 6–3.

== Seeds ==
1. (Czech Republic) Karolína Plíšková (champion)
2. (Czech Republic) Lucie Šafářová (first round)
3. (Czech Republic) Barbora Strýcová (quarterfinals)
4. (Russia) Svetlana Kuznetsova (first round)
5. (France) Alizé Cornet (second round)
6. (Romania) Irina-Camelia Begu (first round)
7. (Switzerland) Belinda Bencic (first round)
8. (Italy) Camila Giorgi (first round)

== Draw ==
Key

- Q = Qualifier
- WC = Wild card
- LL = Lucky loser
- Alt = Alternate
- ITF = ITF entry
- PR = Protected ranking
- SR = Special ranking
- SE = Special exempt
- JE = Junior exempt
- JR = Junior Accelerator Programme entrant
- CO = College Accelerator Programme entrant
- NG = Next Gen Accelerator Program entrant
- w/o = Walkover
- r = Retired
- d = Defaulted

=== Finals ===
Semifinals
1	(Czech Republic) Karolína Plíšková	6	7
(Belgium) Yanina Wickmayer	4	5
(Czech Republic) Kateřina Siniaková	2	6	4
Q	(Czech Republic) Lucie Hradecká	6	4	6

Final
1	(Czech Republic) Karolína Plíšková	4	7	6
Q	(Czech Republic) Lucie Hradecká	6	5	3

=== Top half ===
First round
1	(Czech Republic) Ka Plíšková	2	6	6
(Germany) A Beck	6	1	3
Q	(Belarus) O Govortsova	5	1
(Bulgaria) T Pironkova	7	6
WC	(Czech Republic) D Allertová	6	6
(United States) C Vandeweghe	4	1
WC	(Slovakia) K Schmiedlová	3	3
5	(France) A Cornet	6	6
4	(Russia) S Kuznetsova	4	3
(China) S Zhang	6	6
(Romania) M Niculescu	2	6	4
Q	(Montenegro) D Kovinić	6	2	6
(Serbia) A Krunić	3	7^{7}	6
(Croatia) M Lučić-Baroni	6	6^{4}	0
(Belgium) Y Wickmayer	4	6	7
8	(Italy) C Giorgi	6	3	5

Second round
1	(Czech Republic) Ka Plíšková	3	6	7^{7}
(Bulgaria) T Pironkova	6	3	6^{1}
WC	(Czech Republic) D Allertová	3	7	6
5	(France) A Cornet	6	5	2
(China) S Zhang	1	4
Q	(Montenegro) D Kovinić	6	6
(Serbia) A Krunić	5	7^{7}	5
(Belgium) Y Wickmayer	7	6^{3}	7

Quarterfinals
1	(Czech Republic) Ka Plíšková	6	5	6
WC	(Czech Republic) D Allertová	2	7	1
Q	(Montenegro) D Kovinić	6	3	3
(Belgium) Y Wickmayer	2	6	6

Semifinals
1	(Czech Republic) Ka Plíšková	6	7
(Belgium) Y Wickmayer	4	5

=== Bottom half ===
First round
6	(Romania) I-C Begu	3	3
(Czech Republic) K Siniaková	6	6
(Slovenia) P Hercog	7	3	7^{7}
(United Kingdom) H Watson	5	6	6^{5}
(Slovakia) J Čepelová	2	1
(Russia) E Vesnina	6	6
(United States) M Brengle	6^{5}	3
3	(Czech Republic) B Strýcová	7^{7}	6
7	(Switzerland) B Bencic	5	7^{8}	6^{3}
Q	(Croatia) A Konjuh	7	6^{6}	7^{7}
(Germany) J Görges	6^{3}	2
WC	(Czech Republic) K Koukalová	7^{7}	6
(Russia) A Pavlyuchenkova	1	5
Q	(Czech Republic) L Hradecká	6	7
(Czech Republic) T Smitková	6	2	6
2	(Czech Republic) L Šafářová	3	6	4

Second round
(Czech Republic) K Siniaková	6	6
(Slovenia) P Hercog	1	4
(Russia) E Vesnina	3	3
3	(Czech Republic) B Strýcová	6	6
Q	(Croatia) A Konjuh	4	6	2
WC	(Czech Republic) K Koukalová	6	2	6
Q	(Czech Republic) L Hradecká	6	4	7^{13}
(Czech Republic) T Smitková	3	6	6^{11}

Quarterfinals
(Czech Republic) K Siniaková	6	6
3	(Czech Republic) B Strýcová	4	2
WC	(Czech Republic) K Koukalová	5	6	5
Q	(Czech Republic) L Hradecká	7	4	7

Semifinals
(Czech Republic) K Siniaková	2	6	4
Q	(Czech Republic) L Hradecká	6	4	6

== Qualifying ==
=== Seeds ===
1. (Czech Republic) Lucie Hradecká (qualified)
2. (Belgium) Yanina Wickmayer (moved to main draw)
3. (Croatia) Ana Konjuh (qualified)
4. (Germany) Anna-Lena Friedsam (first round)
5. (Kazakhstan) Yulia Putintseva (qualifying competition)
6. (Montenegro) Danka Kovinić (qualified)
7. (Bulgaria) Sesil Karatantcheva (qualifying competition)
8. (Colombia) Mariana Duque Mariño (second round)
9. (Russia) Elizaveta Kulichkova (first round)

=== Qualifiers ===
1. (Czech Republic) Lucie Hradecká
2. (Belarus) Olga Govortsova
3. (Croatia) Ana Konjuh
4. (Montenegro) Danka Kovinić

=== Draw ===
==== First qualifier ====
First round
1	(Czech Republic) Lucie Hradecká	6	6
WC	(Czech Republic) Lucie Kaňková	1	2
(Czech Republic) Barbora Štefková	4	6	7
(Poland) Paula Kania	6	3	5
(United States) Asia Muhammad	6	6
WC	(Slovakia) Chantal Škamlová	0	0
(Uzbekistan) Nigina Abduraimova	2	0
7	(Bulgaria) Sesil Karatantcheva	6	6

Second round
1	(Czech Republic) Lucie Hradecká	6	6
(Czech Republic) Barbora Štefková	2	1
(United States) Asia Muhammad	6^{5}	7^{9}	1
7	(Bulgaria) Sesil Karatantcheva	7^{7}	6^{7}	6

Qualifying competition
1	(Czech Republic) Lucie Hradecká	6	6
7	(Bulgaria) Sesil Karatantcheva	4	4

==== Second qualifier ====
First round
9	(Russia) Elizaveta Kulichkova	6	2	3
(Netherlands) Michaëlla Krajicek	0	6	6
(Romania) Elena Bogdan	2	6	5
(Belarus) Olga Govortsova	6	4	7
(Czech Republic) Barbora Krejčíková	1	4
(Latvia) Jeļena Ostapenko	6	6
(Czech Republic) Kateřina Vaňková	6^{3}	3
8	(Colombia) Mariana Duque Mariño	7^{7}	6

Second round
(Netherlands) Michaëlla Krajicek	4	6^{5}
(Belarus) Olga Govortsova	6	7^{7}
(Latvia) Jeļena Ostapenko	6	7^{7}
8	(Colombia) Mariana Duque Mariño	4	6^{3}

Qualifying competition
(Belarus) Olga Govortsova	7	4	6
(Latvia) Jeļena Ostapenko	5	6	1

==== Third qualifier ====
First round
3	(Croatia) Ana Konjuh	6	6
(Germany) Nina Zander	3	3
(Russia) Vera Dushevina	3	6	4
(Japan) Risa Ozaki	6	1	6
WC	(Czech Republic) Marie Bouzková	3	7^{7}	2
(Czech Republic) Martina Borecká	6	6^{3}	6
Alt	(Norway) Emma Flood	2	2
5	(Kazakhstan) Yulia Putintseva	6	6

Second round
3	(Croatia) Ana Konjuh	6	6
(Japan) Risa Ozaki	0	3
(Czech Republic) Martina Borecká	1	6	4
5	(Kazakhstan) Yulia Putintseva	6	4	6

Qualifying competition
3	(Croatia) Ana Konjuh	6	6
5	(Kazakhstan) Yulia Putintseva	1	2

==== Fourth qualifier ====
First round
4	(Germany) Anna-Lena Friedsam	5	6	5
(Tunisia) Ons Jabeur	7	2	7
WC	(Czech Republic) Markéta Vondroušová	2	6	6
(Czech Republic) Andrea Hlaváčková	6	3	3
(Ukraine) Kateryna Bondarenko	6	6
(Czech Republic) Pernilla Mendesová	4	2
Alt	(Czech Republic) Jesika Malečková	5	4
6	(Montenegro) Danka Kovinić	7	6

Second round
(Tunisia) Ons Jabeur	3	0^{r}
WC	(Czech Republic) Markéta Vondroušová	6	3
(Ukraine) Kateryna Bondarenko	3	4
6	(Montenegro) Danka Kovinić	6	6

Qualifying competition
WC	(Czech Republic) Markéta Vondroušová	5	6^{7}
6	(Montenegro) Danka Kovinić	7	7^{9}
