= 2015 J&T Banka Prague Open – Doubles =

Doubles
- 2015 J&T Banka Prague Open

Final
- Champions: (Switzerland) Belinda Bencic (Czech Republic) Kateřina Siniaková
- Runners-up: (Ukraine) Kateryna Bondarenko (Czech Republic) Eva Hrdinová
- Score: 6–2, 6–2

Details
- Draw: 16
- Seeds: 4

Events
Singles	Doubles
- J&T Banka Prague Open

Lucie Hradecká and Michaëlla Krajicek were the defending champions, but Hradecká chose not to participate this year. Krajicek played alongside Karolína Plíšková, but lost in the quarterfinals to Belinda Bencic and Kateřina Siniaková.

Bencic and Siniaková went on to win the title, defeating Kateryna Bondarenko and Eva Hrdinová in the final, 6–2, 6–2.

== Seeds ==
1. (Netherlands) Michaëlla Krajicek / (Czech Republic) Karolína Plíšková (quarterfinals)
2. (Ukraine) Lyudmyla Kichenok / (Ukraine) Nadiia Kichenok (quarterfinals)
3. (Russia) Vera Dushevina / (Czech Republic) Andrea Hlaváčková (first round)
4. (Chinese Taipei) Chuang Chia-jung / (China) Liang Chen (quarterfinals)

== Draw ==
Key

- Q = Qualifier
- WC = Wild card
- LL = Lucky loser
- Alt = Alternate
- ITF = ITF entry
- PR = Protected ranking
- SR = Special ranking
- SE = Special exempt
- JE = Junior exempt
- JR = Junior Accelerator Programme entrant
- CO = College Accelerator Programme entrant
- NG = Next Gen Accelerator Program entrant
- w/o = Walkover
- r = Retired
- d = Defaulted

=== Draw ===
First round
1	(Netherlands) M Krajicek (Czech Republic) Ka Plíšková	w/o
(Croatia) M Lučić-Baroni (United States) C Vandeweghe
(Georgia (country)) O Kalashnikova (Montenegro) D Kovinić	3	6	[10]
(Switzerland) B Bencic (Czech Republic) K Siniaková	6	3	[12]
4	(Chinese Taipei) C-j Chuang (China) C Liang	7	6
(Serbia) A Krunić (Croatia) P Martić	5	4
(United States) M Brengle (Slovakia) J Husárová	6	6^{3}	[10]
(Poland) P Kania (Czech Republic) B Krejčíková	2	7^{7}	[6]
(United States) N Melichar (United States) A Muhammad	1	3
(Slovakia) J Čepelová (Slovakia) C Škamlová	6	6
(Czech Republic) K Koukalová (Czech Republic) T Smitková	6	6
3	(Russia) V Dushevina (Czech Republic) A Hlaváčková	3	3
(Ukraine) K Bondarenko (Czech Republic) E Hrdinová	6	6
WC	(Czech Republic) K Vaňková (Czech Republic) M Vondroušová	4	3
(Romania) E Bogdan (Chinese Taipei) C-w Chan	4	2
2	(Ukraine) L Kichenok (Ukraine) N Kichenok	6	6

Quarterfinals
1	(Netherlands) M Krajicek (Czech Republic) Ka Plíšková	3	4
(Switzerland) B Bencic (Czech Republic) K Siniaková	6	6
4	(Chinese Taipei) C-j Chuang (China) C Liang	6	4	[7]
(United States) M Brengle (Slovakia) J Husárová	4	6	[10]
(Slovakia) J Čepelová (Slovakia) C Škamlová	2	6	[10]
(Czech Republic) K Koukalová (Czech Republic) T Smitková	6	3	[8]
(Ukraine) K Bondarenko (Czech Republic) E Hrdinová	6^{3}	6	[10]
2	(Ukraine) L Kichenok (Ukraine) N Kichenok	7^{7}	0	[5]

Semifinals
(Switzerland) B Bencic (Czech Republic) K Siniaková	4	6	[10]
(United States) M Brengle (Slovakia) J Husárová	6	3	[8]
(Slovakia) J Čepelová (Slovakia) C Škamlová	5	0
(Ukraine) K Bondarenko (Czech Republic) E Hrdinová	7	6

Final
(Switzerland) B Bencic (Czech Republic) K Siniaková	6	6
(Ukraine) K Bondarenko (Czech Republic) E Hrdinová	2	2
