= Sabine Klaschka =

German tennis player

- Country (sports): Germany
- Born: 8 August 1980 (age 44); Munich, West Germany
- Turned pro: 1999
- Retired: 2015
- Plays: Right (two-handed backhand)
- Prize money: $183,034

Singles
- Career record: 278–211
- Career titles: 2 ITF
- Highest ranking: No. 133 (12 September 2005)

Grand Slam singles results
- Australian Open: Q2 (2002)
- French Open: Q2 (2002, 2005, 2006)
- Wimbledon: R2 (2005)
- US Open: Q2 (2002)

Doubles
- Career record: 47–76
- Career titles: 1 ITF
- Highest ranking: No. 271 (19 February 2007)

Sabine Klaschka (born 8 August 1980) is a retired German tennis player.

At the 2005 Wimbledon Championships, she beat British number one Elena Baltacha before she was defeated in the second round by sixth seed Elena Dementieva.

On 12 September 2005, she reached her all time ranking high of world No. 133.

Sabine's younger sister, Carmen, also had been a professional tennis player.

== ITF finals ==
=== Singles (2–5) ===
Legend $50,000 tournaments $25,000 tournaments $10,000 tournaments	Finals by surface Hard (0–2) Clay (1–2) Carpet (1–1)

Outcome	No.	Date	Location	Surface	Opponent	Score
Winner	1.	23 August 1999	Hechingen, Germany	Clay	(Hungary) Eszter Molnár	7–6^{(7–4)}, 6–2
Runner-up	1.	6 May 2001	Cagnes-sur-Mer, France	Clay	(Czech Republic) Jana Hlaváčková	5–7, 4–6
Runner-up	2.	21 May 2001	Guimarães, Portugal	Clay	(Italy) Alberta Brianti	2–6, 4–6
Runner-up	3.	30 July 2001	Lexington, United States	Hard	(Slovenia) Katarina Srebotnik	4–6, 5–7
Runner-up	4.	10 January 2005	Stuttgart, Germany	Hard (i)	(Bosnia and Herzegovina) Mervana Jugić-Salkić	2–6, 2–6
Runner-up	5.	18 January 2005	Oberhaching, Germany	Carpet (i)	(Germany) Kristina Barrois	5–7, 4–6
Winner	2.	16 January 2006	Oberhaching, Germany	Carpet (i)	(France) Julie Coin	7–6^{(7–0)}, 4–6, 6–3

=== Doubles (1–3) ===
Legend $50,000 tournaments $10,000 tournaments	Finals by surface Hard (1–2) Carpet (0–1)

Outcome	No.	Date	Location	Surface	Partner	Opponents	Score
Runner-up	1.	25 August 2003	Bielefeld, Germany	Clay	(Germany) Carmen Klaschka	(Czech Republic) Eva Hrdinová (Germany) Claudia Kardys	6–2, 4–6, 6–7^{(5)}
Winner	1.	23 August 2004	Bielefeld, Germany	Clay	(Germany) Carmen Klaschka	(Germany) Christiane Hoppmann (Germany) Madita Suer	6–3, 6–3
Runner-up	2.	February 13, 2007	Saguenay, Canada	Carpet (i)	(Germany) Angelika Rösch	(Germany) Angelique Kerber (Romania) Ágnes Szatmári	1–6, 4–6
Runner-up	3.	11 May 2009	Raleigh, United States	Clay	(Germany) Carmen Klaschka	(United States) Lilia Osterloh (United States) Riza Zalameda	0–6, 0–6
