= 2017 J&T Banka Prague Open – Singles =

Singles
- 2017 J&T Banka Prague Open

Final
- Champion: (Germany) Mona Barthel
- Runner-up: (Czech Republic) Kristýna Plíšková
- Score: 2–6, 7–5, 6–2

Details
- Draw: 32
- Seeds: 8

Events
Singles	Doubles
- J&T Banka Prague Open

Lucie Šafářová was the defending champion, but withdrew from her second-round match against Kristýna Plíšková.

Mona Barthel won the title, defeating Plíšková in the final, 2–6, 7–5, 6–2.

== Seeds ==
1. (Czech Republic) Karolína Plíšková (first round)
2. (Denmark) Caroline Wozniacki (second round)
3. (Czech Republic) Barbora Strýcová (semifinals)
4. (Australia) Samantha Stosur (second round)
5. (Czech Republic) Lucie Šafářová (second round, withdrew)
6. (China) Zhang Shuai (first round)
7. (Croatia) Ana Konjuh (quarterfinals)
8. (Czech Republic) Kateřina Siniaková (quarterfinals)

== Draw ==
Key

- Q = Qualifier
- WC = Wild card
- LL = Lucky loser
- Alt = Alternate
- ITF = ITF entry
- PR = Protected ranking
- SR = Special ranking
- SE = Special exempt
- JE = Junior exempt
- JR = Junior Accelerator Programme entrant
- CO = College Accelerator Programme entrant
- NG = Next Gen Accelerator Program entrant
- w/o = Walkover
- r = Retired
- d = Defaulted

=== Finals ===
Semifinals
Q	(Germany) Mona Barthel	3	6	6
3	(Czech Republic) Barbora Strýcová	6	2	3
(Czech Republic) Kristýna Plíšková	6	6
(Latvia) Jeļena Ostapenko	4	2

Final
Q	(Germany) Mona Barthel	2	7	6
(Czech Republic) Kristýna Plíšková	6	5	2

=== Top half ===
First round
1	(Czech Republic) Ka Plíšková	6^{6}	2
(Italy) C Giorgi	7^{8}	6
(China) Q Wang	6	4	6
(Greece) M Sakkari	1	6	2
(Germany) A Beck	5	4
(France) O Dodin	7	6
Q	(Germany) M Barthel	6	6
6	(China) S Zhang	0	3
3	(Czech Republic) B Strýcová	6	6
(Germany) J Görges	4	0
(Poland) M Linette	3	4
Q	(Czech Republic) L Hradecká	6	6
(Switzerland) V Golubic	1	1
Q	(Russia) N Vikhlyantseva	6	6
(Montenegro) D Kovinić	2	6	2
8	(Czech Republic) K Siniaková	6	4	6

Second round
(Italy) C Giorgi	4	6	6
(China) Q Wang	6	3	2
(France) O Dodin	3	1
Q	(Germany) M Barthel	6	6
3	(Czech Republic) B Strýcová	6	7
Q	(Czech Republic) L Hradecká	3	5
Q	(Russia) N Vikhlyantseva	6	4	4
8	(Czech Republic) K Siniaková	4	6	6

Quarterfinals
(Italy) C Giorgi	6^{0}	6^{6}
Q	(Germany) M Barthel	7^{7}	7^{8}
3	(Czech Republic) B Strýcová	6	5	6
8	(Czech Republic) K Siniaková	3	7	3

Semifinals
Q	(Germany) M Barthel	3	6	6
3	(Czech Republic) B Strýcová	6	2	3

=== Bottom half ===
First round
5	(Czech Republic) L Šafářová	3	7	6
(Slovakia) K Kučová	6	5	3
WC	(Serbia) J Janković	4	4
(Czech Republic) Kr Plíšková	6	6
(United States) C McHale	3	4
Q	(Brazil) B Haddad Maia	6	6
(Russia) E Rodina	2	3
4	(Australia) S Stosur	6	6
7	(Croatia) A Konjuh	6	6
WC	(Slovakia) J Čepelová	2	2
(Germany) C Witthöft	7^{8}	5	2
WC	(Czech Republic) M Vondroušová	6^{6}	7	6
(Latvia) J Ostapenko	6	6
(Ukraine) L Tsurenko	4	3
(Japan) M Doi	0	5
2	(Denmark) C Wozniacki	6	7

Second round
5	(Czech Republic) L Šafářová
(Czech Republic) Kr Plíšková	w/o
Q	(Brazil) B Haddad Maia	6	6
4	(Australia) S Stosur	3	2
7	(Croatia) A Konjuh	6	7^{7}
WC	(Czech Republic) M Vondroušová	4	6^{2}
(Latvia) J Ostapenko	5	6	7^{7}
2	(Denmark) C Wozniacki	7	3	6^{5}

Quarterfinals
(Czech Republic) Kr Plíšková	6^{5}	6	6
Q	(Brazil) B Haddad Maia	7^{7}	4	2
7	(Croatia) A Konjuh	6	4	3
(Latvia) J Ostapenko	3	6	6

Semifinals
(Czech Republic) Kr Plíšková	6	6
(Latvia) J Ostapenko	4	2

== Qualifying ==
=== Seeds ===
1. (Japan) Risa Ozaki (first round)
2. (Russia) Natalia Vikhlyantseva (qualified)
3. (Germany) Mona Barthel (qualified)
4. (Croatia) Donna Vekić (qualifying competition)
5. (Russia) Ekaterina Alexandrova (first round)
6. (Belarus) Aliaksandra Sasnovich (first round)
7. (Colombia) Mariana Duque Mariño (qualifying competition)
8. (Czech Republic) Denisa Allertová (qualifying competition)

=== Qualifiers ===
1. (Czech Republic) Lucie Hradecká
2. (Russia) Natalia Vikhlyantseva
3. (Germany) Mona Barthel
4. (Brazil) Beatriz Haddad Maia

=== Draw ===
==== First qualifier ====
First round
1	(Japan) Risa Ozaki	4	7	2
(Czech Republic) Lucie Hradecká	6	5	6
(France) Virginie Razzano	7	3	3
WC	(Czech Republic) Karolína Beránková	5	6	6
(Germany) Tamara Korpatsch	6	5	5
(Romania) Ana Bogdan	2	7	7
(Czech Republic) Tereza Martincová	6	6
6	(Belarus) Aliaksandra Sasnovich	3	1

Second round
(Czech Republic) Lucie Hradecká	6	6
WC	(Czech Republic) Karolína Beránková	3	3
(Romania) Ana Bogdan	6	6
(Czech Republic) Tereza Martincová	3	1

Qualifying competition
(Czech Republic) Lucie Hradecká	6	6
(Romania) Ana Bogdan	2	4

==== Second qualifier ====
First round
2	(Russia) Natalia Vikhlyantseva	6	6
Alt	(Poland) Katarzyna Piter	1	0
(Czech Republic) Tereza Smitková	7^{7}	1	7
WC	(United Kingdom) Heather Watson	6^{3}	6	5
WC	(Czech Republic) Anastasia Zarycká	3	6	6
WC	(Czech Republic) Monika Kilnarová	6	1	4
(Slovakia) Viktória Kužmová	7	4	4
7	(Colombia) Mariana Duque Mariño	5	6	6

Second round
2	(Russia) Natalia Vikhlyantseva	6	6
(Czech Republic) Tereza Smitková	2	3
WC	(Czech Republic) Anastasia Zarycká	1	2
7	(Colombia) Mariana Duque Mariño	6	6

Qualifying competition
2	(Russia) Natalia Vikhlyantseva	6	6
7	(Colombia) Mariana Duque Mariño	2	1

==== Third qualifier ====
First round
3	(Germany) Mona Barthel	6	6
(United States) Sachia Vickery	3	2
(Italy) Jasmine Paolini	7^{7}	3	6
(Russia) Veronika Kudermetova	6^{3}	6	4
(Russia) Anastasiya Komardina	5	6	4
(Russia) Anna Kalinskaya	7	4	6
(Bulgaria) Isabella Shinikova	4	1
8	(Czech Republic) Denisa Allertová	6	6

Second round
3	(Germany) Mona Barthel	6	4	7^{7}
(Italy) Jasmine Paolini	2	6	6^{3}
(Russia) Anna Kalinskaya	4	1
8	(Czech Republic) Denisa Allertová	6	6

Qualifying competition
3	(Germany) Mona Barthel	6	6
8	(Czech Republic) Denisa Allertová	0	3

==== Fourth qualifier ====
First round
4	(Croatia) Donna Vekić	6	7
(Russia) Viktoria Kamenskaya	2	5
(Chinese Taipei) Chang Kai-chen	3	6^{4}
(Germany) Antonia Lottner	6	7^{7}
(United States) Asia Muhammad	0	3
(Slovakia) Rebecca Šramková	6	6
(Brazil) Beatriz Haddad Maia	6	7
5	(Russia) Ekaterina Alexandrova	3	5

Second round
4	(Croatia) Donna Vekić	6	6
(Germany) Antonia Lottner	2	4
(Slovakia) Rebecca Šramková	4	0
(Brazil) Beatriz Haddad Maia	6	6

Qualifying competition
4	(Croatia) Donna Vekić	6	4	3
(Brazil) Beatriz Haddad Maia	4	6	6
