= 2012 Sparta Prague Open – Singles =

Singles
- 2012 Sparta Prague Open

Final
- Champion: (Czech Republic) Lucie Šafářová
- Runner-up: (Czech Republic) Klára Zakopalová
- Score: 6–3, 7–5

Details
- Draw: 32
- Seeds: 8

Events
Singles	Doubles
← 2011 ·	Sparta Prague Open	· 2013 →

Magdaléna Rybáriková was the defending champion, but she withdrew from the competition.

Lucie Šafářová defeated Klára Zakopalová in the final 6–3, 7–5.

== Seeds ==
1. (Czech Republic) Lucie Šafářová (champion)
2. (Czech Republic) Klára Zakopalová (final)
3. (Czech Republic) Barbora Záhlavová-Strýcová (first round)
4. (Hungary) Tímea Babos (second round)
5. (Greece) Eleni Daniilidou (first round)
6. (United Kingdom) Elena Baltacha (semifinals)
7. (Japan) Kimiko Date-Krumm (quarterfinals)
8. (Japan) Ayumi Morita (quarterfinals)

== Main draw ==
=== Key ===
- Q = Qualifier
- WC = Wild card
- LL = Lucky loser
- Alt = Alternate
- SE = Special exempt
- PR = Protected ranking
- ITF = ITF entry
- JE = Junior exempt
- w/o = Walkover
- r = Retired
- d = Defaulted
- SR = Special ranking

=== Finals ===
Semifinals
1	(Czech Republic) Lucie Šafářová	3	7	6
(France) Alizé Cornet	6	5	1
6	(United Kingdom) Elena Baltacha	1	3
2	(Czech Republic) Klára Zakopalová	6	6

Final
1	(Czech Republic) Lucie Šafářová	6	7
2	(Czech Republic) Klára Zakopalová	3	5

=== Top half ===
First round
1	(Czech Republic) L Šafářová	6	7^{7}
Q	(Puerto Rico) M Puig	3	6^{4}
LL	(Japan) R Fujiwara	1	2
(Czech Republic) Ka Plíšková	6	6
(France) S Foretz Gacon	4	6^{5}
(Switzerland) S Vögele	6	7^{7}
(Uzbekistan) A Amanmuradova	4	3
8	(Japan) A Morita	6	6
3	(Czech Republic) B Záhlavová-Strýcová	3	1
(Australia) C Dellacqua	6	6
WC	(Slovakia) J Čepelová	2	1
(France) A Cornet	6	6
(Australia) O Rogowska	1	4
(Czech Republic) E Birnerová	6	6
Q	(Germany) A Beck	2	7	6
5	(Greece) E Daniilidou	6	5	3

Second round
1	(Czech Republic) L Šafářová	6	7
(Czech Republic) Ka Plíšková	3	5
(Switzerland) S Vögele
8	(Japan) A Morita	w/o
(Australia) C Dellacqua	3	4
(France) A Cornet	6	6
(Czech Republic) E Birnerová	3	6	7
Q	(Germany) A Beck	6	1	5

Quarterfinals
1	(Czech Republic) L Šafářová	6	6
8	(Japan) A Morita	1	3
(France) A Cornet	6	6
(Czech Republic) E Birnerová	2	2

Semifinals
1	(Czech Republic) L Šafářová	3	7	6
(France) A Cornet	6	5	1

=== Bottom half ===
First round
6	(United Kingdom) E Baltacha	6	6
(Spain) L Arruabarrena Vecino	3	1
(Poland) U Radwańska	6	6
(Czech Republic) Kr Plíšková	3	3
(Canada) S Dubois	3	5
Q	(Latvia) A Sevastova	6	7
WC	(Czech Republic) T Smitková	6^{4}	5
4	(Hungary) T Babos	7^{7}	7
7	(Japan) K Date-Krumm	7	6
WC	(Czech Republic) D Allertová	5	1
LL	(Czech Republic) S Záhlavová	6	3	6^{4}
Q	(China) S Zhang	1	6	7^{7}
(Japan) M Doi	6	7^{7}
(France) V Razzano	1	6^{0}
WC	(Czech Republic) M Přádová	1	0
2	(Czech Republic) K Zakopalová	6	6

Second round
6	(United Kingdom) E Baltacha	6	6
(Poland) U Radwańska	1	4
Q	(Latvia) A Sevastova	7	6
4	(Hungary) T Babos	5	3
7	(Japan) K Date-Krumm	6	5	7^{7}
Q	(China) S Zhang	4	7	6^{5}
(Japan) M Doi	6^{3}	4
2	(Czech Republic) K Zakopalová	7^{7}	6

Quarterfinals
6	(United Kingdom) E Baltacha	6	6
Q	(Latvia) A Sevastova	3	4
7	(Japan) K Date-Krumm	6	0	4
2	(Czech Republic) K Zakopalová	2	6	6

Semifinals
6	(United Kingdom) E Baltacha	1	3
2	(Czech Republic) K Zakopalová	6	6
