= Carmen Klaschka =

German tennis player

- Country (sports): Germany
- Born: 8 January 1987 (age 38); Munich, West Germany
- Height: 1.72 m (5 ft 7 1/2 in)
- Prize money: $118,907

Singles
- Career record: 170–135
- Career titles: 3 ITF
- Highest ranking: 167 (27 July 2009)

Grand Slam singles results
- Australian Open: Q1 (2009)
- French Open: Q3 (2009)
- Wimbledon: Q1 (2009)
- US Open: Q2 (2007)

Doubles
- Career record: 129–86
- Career titles: 10 ITF
- Highest ranking: 125 (3 August 2009)

Carmen Klaschka (born 8 January 1987) is a retired German tennis player.

Klaschka won three singles titles and ten doubles titles on the ITF Circuit in her career. On 27 July 2009, she reached her best singles ranking of world No. 167. On 3 August 2009, she peaked at No. 125 in the doubles rankings.

Carmen's sister, Sabine Klaschka, is also a professional tennis player.

== ITF finals ==
=== Singles (3–5) ===
Legend $100,000 tournaments $75,000 tournaments $50,000 tournaments $25,000 tournaments $10,000 tournaments	Finals by surface Hard (2–1) Clay (0–3) Grass (0–0) Carpet (1–1)

Result	No.	Date	Tournament	Surface	Opponent	Score
Win	1.	31 October 2005	ITF Stockholm, Sweden	Hard (i)	(Sweden) Johanna Larsson	6–3, 6–3
Win	2.	30 October 2006	ITF Erding, Germany	Carpet (i)	(Germany) Julia Görges	6–4, 1–0 ret.
Loss	1.	13 November 2006	ITF Mexico City	Clay	(Austria) Yvonne Meusburger	3–6, 4–6
Loss	2.	22 January 2007	ITF Capriolo, Italy	Carpet (i)	(Estonia) Maret Ani	6–2, 1–6, 1–6
Loss	3.	2 April 2007	ITF Putignano, Italy	Hard	(Estonia) Maret Ani	6–7^{(8)}, 4–6
Loss	4.	2 July 2007	ITF Stuttgart, Germany	Clay	(Germany) Stephanie Gehrlein	3–6, 6–7^{(7)}
Loss	5.	28 July 2008	ITF Bad Saulgau, Germany	Clay	(Czech Republic) Lucie Hradecká	1–6, 6–4, 4–6
Win	3.	18 August 2008	ITF Westende, Belgium	Hard	(France) Florence Haring	4–6, 6–4, 6–4

=== Doubles (10–15) ===
Legend $100,000 tournaments $75,000 tournaments $50,000 tournaments $25,000 tournaments $10,000 tournaments	Finals by surface Hard (2–3) Clay (8–11) Grass (0–0) Carpet (0–1)

Result	No.	Date	Tournament	Surface	Partner	Opponents	Score
Loss	1.	25 August 2003	ITF Bielefeld, Germany	Clay	(Germany) Sabine Klaschka	(Czech Republic) Eva Hrdinová (Germany) Claudia Kardys	6–2, 4–6, 6–7^{(5)}
Win	1.	23 August 2004	ITF Bielefeld, Germany	Clay	(Germany) Sabine Klaschka	(Germany) Christiane Hoppmann (Germany) Madita Suer	6–3, 6–3
Loss	2.	6 September 2004	ITF Durmersheim, Germany	Clay	(Germany) Imke Kusgen	(Czech Republic) Janette Bejlková (Czech Republic) Petra Cetkovská	3–6, 6–7^{(4)}
Win	2.	11 July 2005	ITF Brussels, Belgium	Clay	(Czech Republic) Iveta Gerlová	(Belgium) Leslie Butkiewicz (Belgium) Caroline Maes	7–5, 6–2
Win	3.	15 August 2005	ITF Koksijde, Belgium	Clay	(Czech Republic) Iveta Gerlová	(Belgium) Jessie de Vries (Algeria) Samia Medjahdi	6–1, 6–0
DNP	–	7 November 2005	ITF Mallorca, Spain	Clay	(Croatia) Gianna Doz	(Spain) Rebeca Bou Nogueiro (Spain) Verónica Rizhik Urteaga	—
Win	4.	6 March 2006	ITF Sunderland, England	Hard (i)	(Germany) Korina Perkovic	(Sweden) Nadja Roma (Finland) Piia Suomalainen	6–2, 6–3
Win	5.	13 March 2006	ITF Rome, Italy	Clay	(Croatia) Darija Jurak	(Croatia) Gianna Doz (Austria) Stefanie Haidner	6–2, 6–2
Loss	3.	12 June 2006	ITF Lenzerheide, Switzerland	Clay	(Germany) Justine Ozga	(Czech Republic) Nikola Fraňková (Czech Republic) Lucie Kriegsmannová	2–6, 4–6
Win	6.	10 July 2006	ITF Brussels, Belgium	Clay	(Czech Republic) Iveta Gerlová	(Brazil) Joana Cortez (Sweden) Aleksandra Srndovic	6–3, 6–2
Win	7.	21 August 2006	ITF Bielefeld, Germany	Clay	(Germany) Justine Ozga	(Austria) Daniela Klemenschits (Austria) Sandra Klemenschits	6–7^{(1)}, 6–3, 6–3
Loss	4.	11 September 2006	ITF Gliwice, Poland	Clay	(Germany) Justine Ozga	(Ukraine) Veronika Kapshay (Australia) Arina Rodionova	4–6, 5–7
Loss	5.	30 October 2006	ITF Erding, Germany	Carpet (i)	(Germany) Annette Kolb	(Austria) Daniela Klemenschits (Austria) Sandra Klemenschits	6–1, 3–6, 2–6
Loss	6.	2 April 2007	ITF Putignano, Italy	Hard	(United States) Jessica Kirkland	(Slovenia) Andreja Klepač (Romania) Monica Niculescu	2–6, 5–7
Loss	7.	18 June 2007	ITF Fontanafredda, Italy	Clay	(Romania) Magda Mihalache	(Bosnia and Herzegovina) Mervana Jugić-Salkić (Serbia) Teodora Mirčić	2–6, 1–6
Loss	8.	2 July 2007	ITF Stuttgart, Germany	Clay	(Croatia) Darija Jurak	(Belarus) Ekaterina Dzehalevich (Belgium) Yanina Wickmayer	3–6, 2–6
Loss	9.	23 June 2008	ITF Padua, Italy	Clay	(Argentina) Mailen Auroux	(Romania) Anda Perianu (Romania) Liana Ungur	3–6, 3–6
Loss	10.	4 August 2008	ITF Hechingen, Germany	Clay	(Croatia) Darija Jurak	(Indonesia) Yayuk Basuki (Indonesia) Romana Tedjakusuma	6–2, 2–6, [6–10]
Win	8.	1 September 2008	ITF Maribor, Slovenia	Clay	(Germany) Andrea Petkovic	(Hungary) Kira Nagy (Belarus) Anastasiya Yakimova	6–0, 2–6, [10–3]
Loss	11.	6 October 2008	ITF Jounieh, Lebanon	Clay	(Germany) Laura Siegemund	(Netherlands) Chayenne Ewijk (Belarus) Anastasiya Yakimova	5–7, 5–7
Loss	12.	13 October 2008	ITF Toronto, Canada	Hard (i)	(Czech Republic) Nikola Fraňková	(Canada) Stéphanie Dubois (Canada) Marie-Ève Pelletier	4–6, 3–6
Win	9.	24 November 2008	ITF Saint-Denis, France (Réunion)	Hard	(Germany) Laura Siegemund	(South Africa) Surina De Beer (Belgium) Tamaryn Hendler	6–3, 6–1
Loss	13.	11 May 2009	ITF Raleigh, United States	Clay	(Germany) Sabine Klaschka	(United States) Lilia Osterloh (United States) Riza Zalameda	0–6, 0–6
Loss	14.	8 June 2009	ITF Zlín, Czech Republic	Clay	(Czech Republic) Nikola Fraňková	(Slovakia) Kristína Kučová (Slovakia) Zuzana Kučová	3–6, 4–6
Loss	15.	22 February 2010	ITF Biberach, Germany	Hard (i)	(Germany) Mona Barthel	(France) Stéphanie Cohen-Aloro (Tunisia) Selima Sfar	7–5, 1–6, [5–10]
Win	10.	31 May 2010	ITF Brno, Czech Republic	Clay	(Germany) Laura Siegemund	(Belarus) Darya Kustova (Ukraine) Lesia Tsurenko	w/o
