= WTA Prague Open =

Prague Open
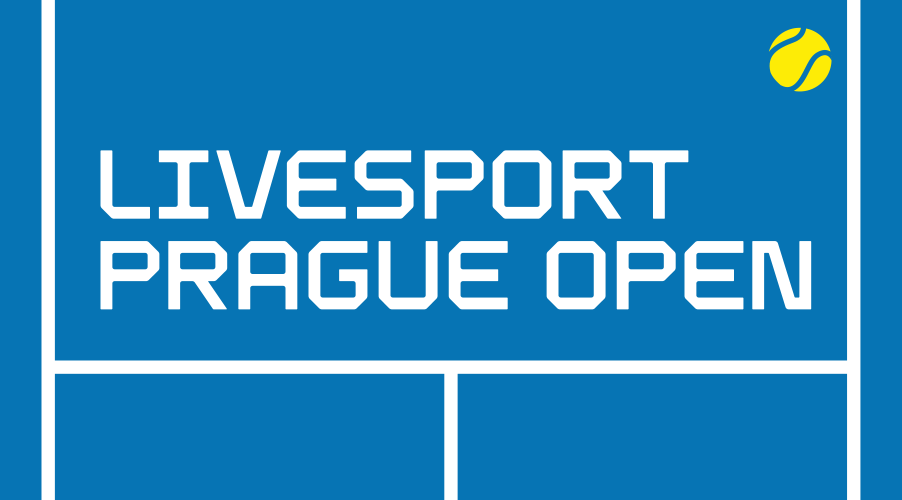

WTA Tour
- Event name: Prague Open
- Location: Prague; Czech Republic
- Venue: TK Sparta Prague (2010–2025); I. ČLTK Prague (2026–present)
- Category: ITF Women's Circuit (2010–2014); WTA International (2015–2020); WTA 250 (since 2021)
- Surface: Clay – outdoors (2010–2020); Hard – outdoors (2021–)
- Draw: 32S / 24Q / 16D
- Prize money: US$ 283,347 (2026)
- Website: tennispragueopen.cz

Current champions (2026)
- Singles: (Austria) Lilli Tagger
- Doubles: (United Kingdom) Harriet Dart (United Kingdom) Maia Lumsden

The Prague Open, known as the Livesport Prague Open for sponsorship reasons, is a professional women's tennis tournament that is held in Prague, Czech Republic. It began in 2010, initially as an ITF Circuit $50,000 event upgraded to $100,000. It became a WTA International tournament in 2015, and the prize money increased to $250,000.

The tournament is played on outdoor hard courts at the TK Sparta Prague, and since 2026 at the I. ČLTK Prague on Štvanice island. The tournament was held on outdoor clay courts before 2021.

Lucie Šafářová in singles, and Lucie Hradecká in doubles, are the record holders of the tournament, with three titles for each one.

== Tournament names ==
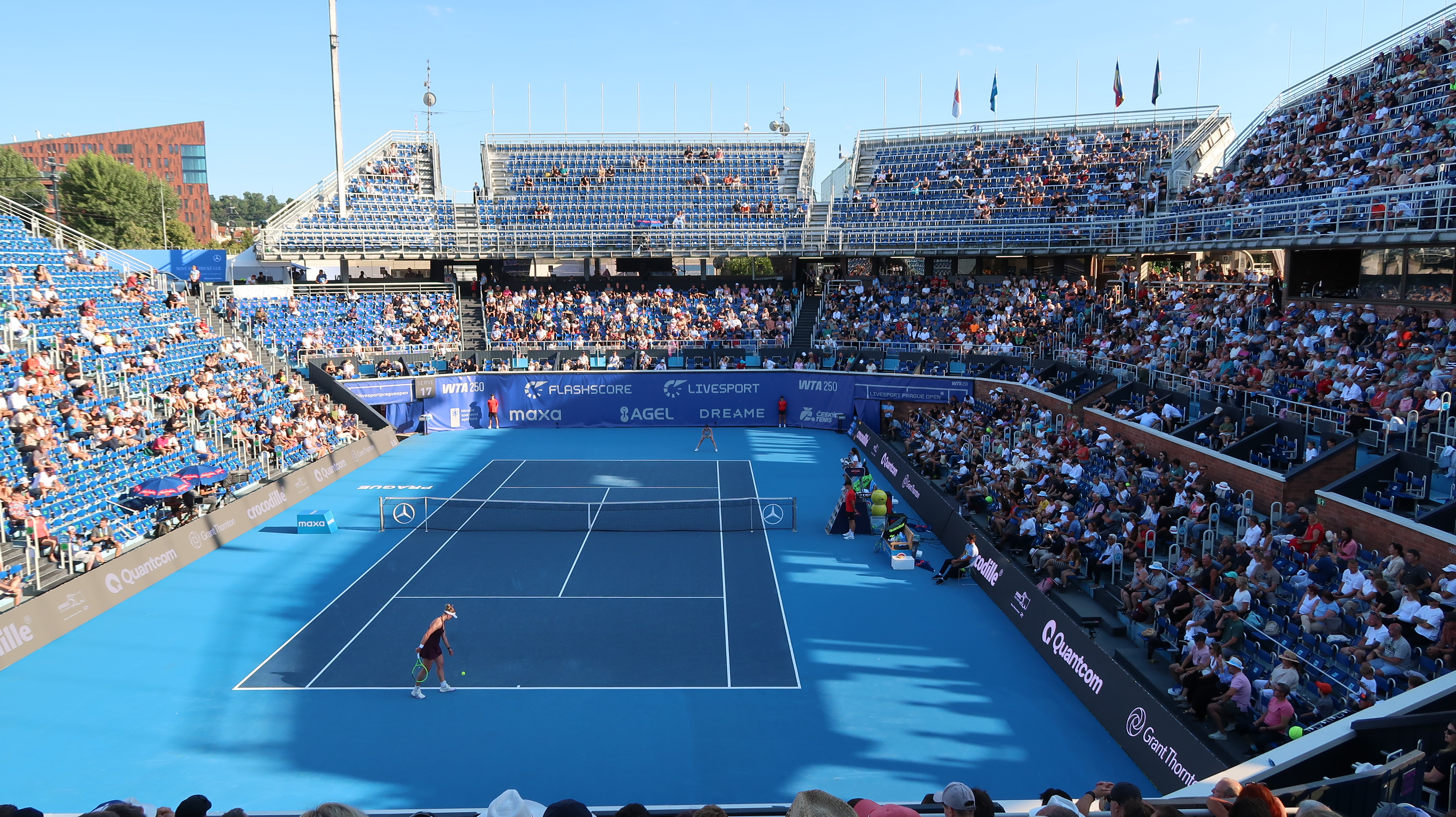
Livesport arena at the I. ČLTK Prague in Štvanice which is the tournament's venue since 2026

- 2010–2014: Sparta Prague Open
- 2015–2020: J&T Banka Prague Open, title sponsor J&T Banka
- 2020: Prague Open
- 2021–: Livesport Prague Open, title sponsor Livesport

== Past finals ==
=== Singles ===
| Year | Champion | Runner-up | Score |
|---|---|---|---|
↓ ITF tournament ↓
| 2010 | (Czech Republic) Lucie Hradecká | (Croatia) Ajla Tomljanović | 6–1, 7–6^{(7–4)} |
| 2011 | (Slovakia) Magdaléna Rybáriková | (Czech Republic) Petra Kvitová | 6–3, 6–4 |
| 2012 | (Czech Republic) Lucie Šafářová | (Czech Republic) Klára Zakopalová | 6–3, 7–5 |
| 2013 | (Czech Republic) Lucie Šafářová (2) | (Romania) Alexandra Cadanțu | 3–6, 6–1, 6–1 |
| 2014 | (United Kingdom) Heather Watson | (Slovakia) Anna Karolína Schmiedlová | 7–6^{(7–5)}, 6–0 |
↓ WTA International tournament ↓
| 2015 | (Czech Republic) Karolína Plíšková | (Czech Republic) Lucie Hradecká | 4–6, 7–5, 6–3 |
| 2016 | (Czech Republic) Lucie Šafářová (3) | (Australia) Samantha Stosur | 3–6, 6–1, 6–4 |
| 2017 | (Germany) Mona Barthel | (Czech Republic) Kristýna Plíšková | 2–6, 7–5, 6–2 |
| 2018 | (Czech Republic) Petra Kvitová | (Romania) Mihaela Buzărnescu | 4–6, 6–2, 6–3 |
| 2019 | (Switzerland) Jil Teichmann | (Czech Republic) Karolína Muchová | 7–6^{(7–5)}, 3–6, 6–4 |
| 2020 | (Romania) Simona Halep | (Belgium) Elise Mertens | 6–2, 7–5 |
| 2021 | (Czech Republic) Barbora Krejčíková | (Czech Republic) Tereza Martincová | 6–2, 6–0 |
| 2022 | (Czech Republic) Marie Bouzková | Anastasia Potapova | 6–0, 6–3 |
| 2023 | (Japan) Nao Hibino | (Czech Republic) Linda Nosková | 6–4, 6–1 |
| 2024 | (Poland) Magda Linette | (Poland) Magdalena Fręch | 6–2, 6–1 |
| 2025 | (Czech Republic) Marie Bouzková (2) | (Czech Republic) Linda Nosková | 2–6, 6–1, 6–3 |
| 2026 | (Austria) Lilli Tagger | (Ukraine) Daria Snigur | 7–6^{(7–3)}, 6–2 |

=== Doubles ===
| Year | Champions | Runners-up | Score |
|---|---|---|---|
↓ ITF tournament ↓
| 2010 | (Russia) Ksenia Lykina (Slovenia) Maša Zec Peškirič | (Czech Republic) Petra Cetkovská (Czech Republic) Eva Hrdinová | 6–3, 6–4 |
| 2011 | (Czech Republic) Petra Cetkovská (Netherlands) Michaëlla Krajicek | (United States) Lindsay Lee-Waters (United States) Megan Moulton-Levy | 6–2, 6–1 |
| 2012 | (France) Alizé Cornet (France) Virginie Razzano | (Uzbekistan) Akgul Amanmuradova (Australia) Casey Dellacqua | 6–2, 6–3 |
| 2013 | (Czech Republic) Renata Voráčová (Czech Republic) Barbora Záhlavová-Strýcová | (United States) Irina Falconi (Czech Republic) Eva Hrdinová | 6–4, 6–0 |
| 2014 | (Czech Republic) Lucie Hradecká (Netherlands) Michaëlla Krajicek (2) | (Czech Republic) Andrea Hlaváčková (Czech Republic) Lucie Šafářová | 6–3, 6–2 |
↓ WTA International tournament ↓
| 2015 | (Switzerland) Belinda Bencic (Czech Republic) Kateřina Siniaková | (Ukraine) Kateryna Bondarenko (Czech Republic) Eva Hrdinová | 6–2, 6–2 |
| 2016 | (Russia) Margarita Gasparyan (Czech Republic) Andrea Hlaváčková | (Argentina) María Irigoyen (Poland) Paula Kania | 6–4, 6–2 |
| 2017 | (Germany) Anna-Lena Grönefeld (Czech Republic) Květa Peschke | (Czech Republic) Lucie Hradecká (Czech Republic) Kateřina Siniaková | 6–4, 7–6^{(7–3)} |
| 2018 | (United States) Nicole Melichar (Czech Republic) Květa Peschke (2) | (Romania) Mihaela Buzărnescu (Belarus) Lidziya Marozava | 6–4, 6–2 |
| 2019 | (Russia) Anna Kalinskaya (Slovakia) Viktória Kužmová | (United States) Nicole Melichar (Czech Republic) Květa Peschke | 4–6, 7–5, [10–7] |
| 2020 | (Czech Republic) Lucie Hradecká (2) (Czech Republic) Kristýna Plíšková | (Romania) Monica Niculescu (Romania) Raluca Olaru | 6–2, 6–2 |
| 2021 | (Czech Republic) Marie Bouzková (Czech Republic) Lucie Hradecká (3) | (Slovakia) Viktória Kužmová (Serbia) Nina Stojanović | 7–6^{(7–3)}, 6–4 |
| 2022 | Anastasia Potapova; Yana Sizikova | Angelina Gabueva; Anastasia Zakharova | 6–3, 6–4 |
| 2023 | (Japan) Nao Hibino (Georgia (country)) Oksana Kalashnikova | (United States) Quinn Gleason (France) Elixane Lechemia | 6–7^{(7–9)}, 7–5, [10–3] |
| 2024 | (Czech Republic) Barbora Krejčíková (Czech Republic) Kateřina Siniaková (2) | (United States) Bethanie Mattek-Sands (Czech Republic) Lucie Šafářová | 6–3, 6–3 |
| 2025 | (Ukraine) Nadiia Kichenok (Japan) Makoto Ninomiya | (Czech Republic) Lucie Havlíčková (Czech Republic) Laura Samson | 1–6, 6–4, [10–7] |
| 2026 | (United Kingdom) Harriet Dart (United Kingdom) Maia Lumsden | (Czech Republic) Lucie Havlíčková (Czech Republic) Laura Samson | 6–4, 6–4 |

== See also ==
- I.ČLTK Prague Open
- Sparta Prague Open Challenger
