= TK Sparta Prague =

Tennis club in Prague, Czech Republic

- TK Sparta Praha

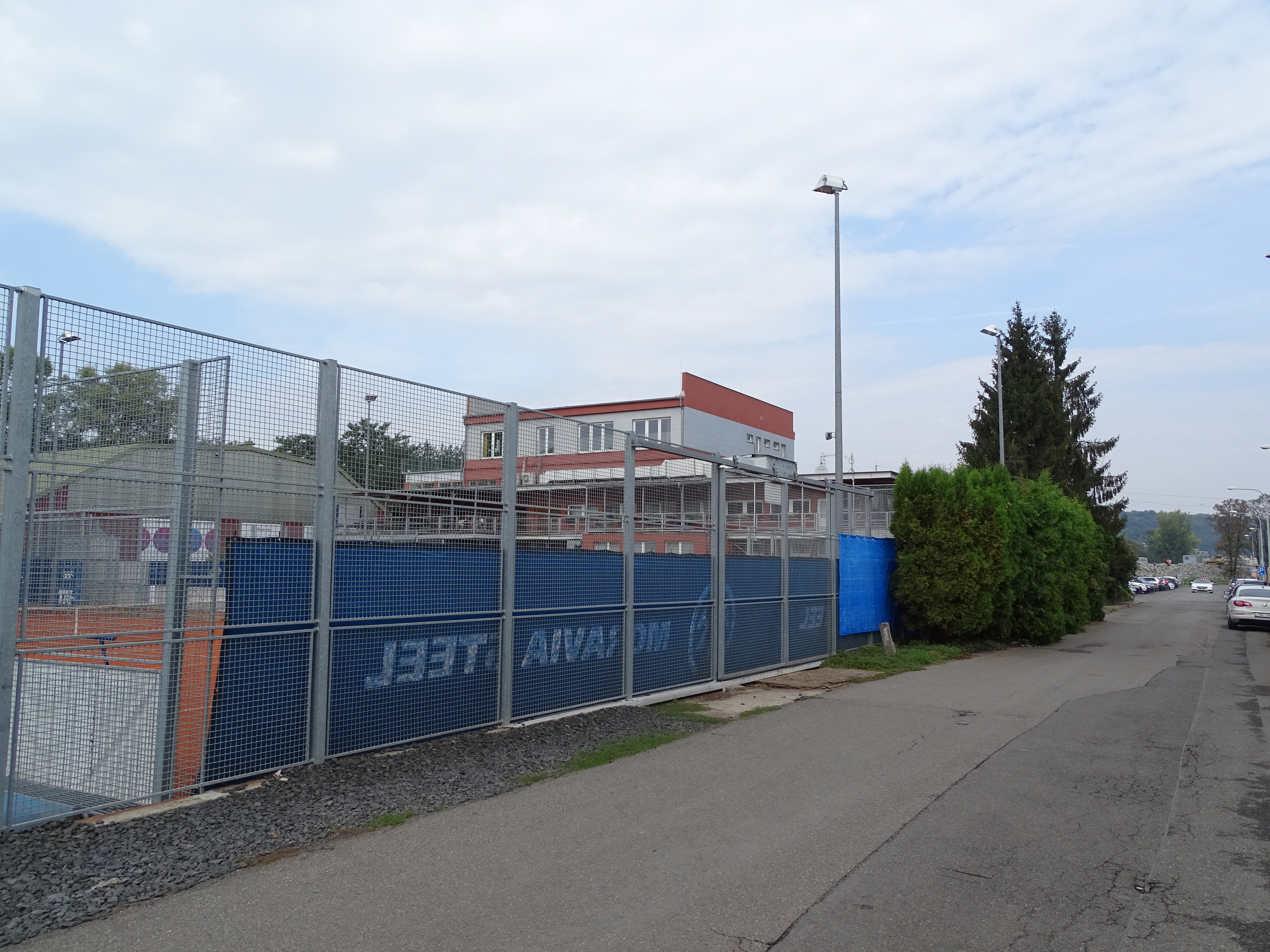
- Formation: 1905; 121 years ago
- Location: Prague, Czech Republic
- Coordinates: 50.1105°N 14.4093°E
- Chairman: Jakub Kotrba
- Website: tkspartapraha.cz

TK Sparta Prague (Czech: TK Sparta Praha) is a tennis club and training center located in Bubeneč, Prague, Czech Republic. Located near Stromovka on the left bank of the Vltava, it is one of the most prestigious tennis clubs in the country.

== History ==
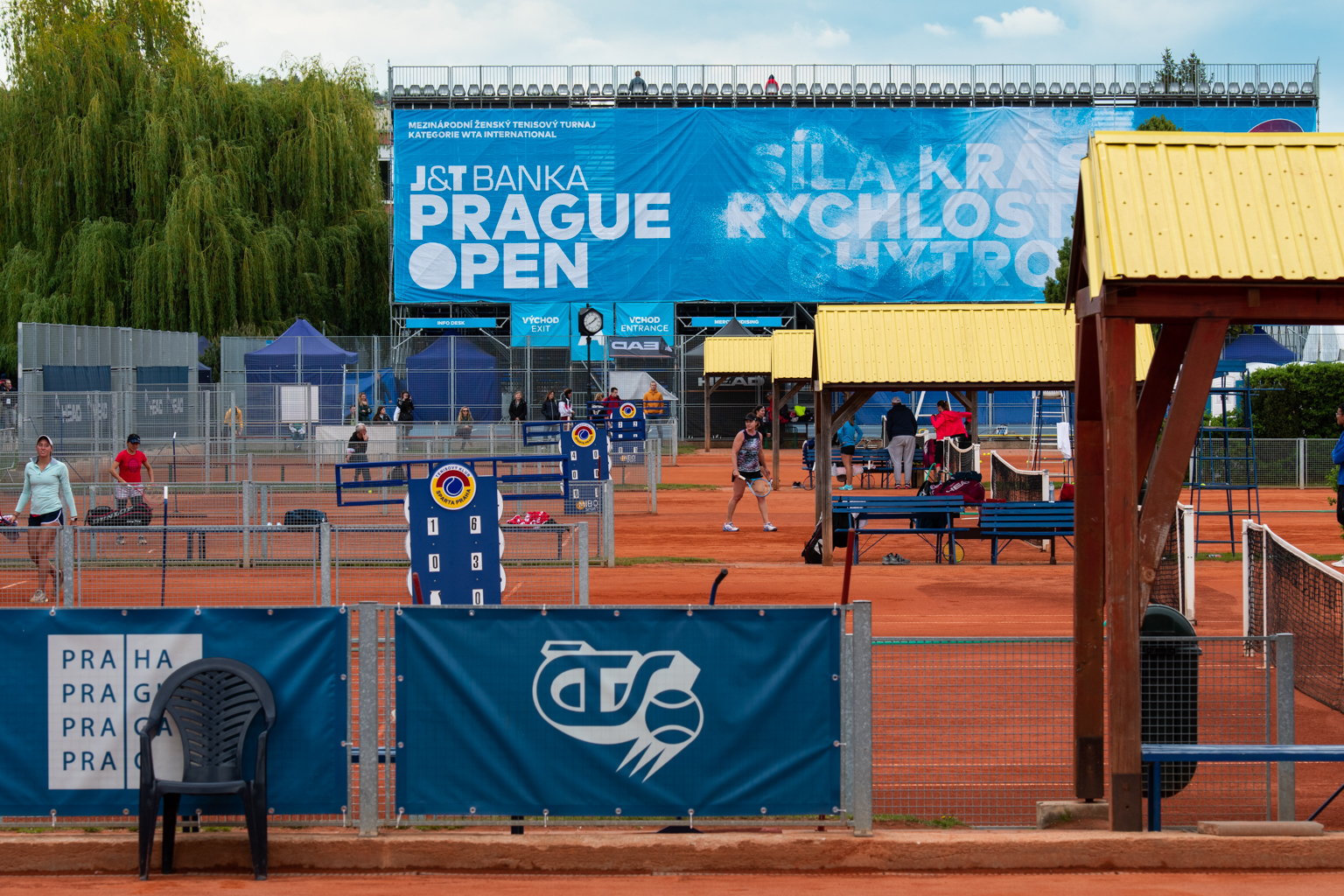
The club hosts the WTA Prague Open.

The club was founded in 1905. It houses 23 outdoor and 12 indoor courts. The club hosts the WTA Prague Open and the Sparta Prague Open Challenger.

The club was damaged during the 2002 and 2013 European floods.

== Notable players ==
- Marie Bouzková
- Jakub Filip
- Lucie Havlíčková
- Jan Kodeš
- Alena Kovačková
- Petra Kvitová
- Tomáš Macháč
- Hana Mandlíková
- Barbora Palicová
- Karolina Plíšková
- Patrik Rikl
- Laura Samson
- Kateřina Siniaková
- Barbora Strýcová
- Tereza Valentová
- Michael Vrbenský
