= Maša Zec Peškirič =

Slovenian tennis player

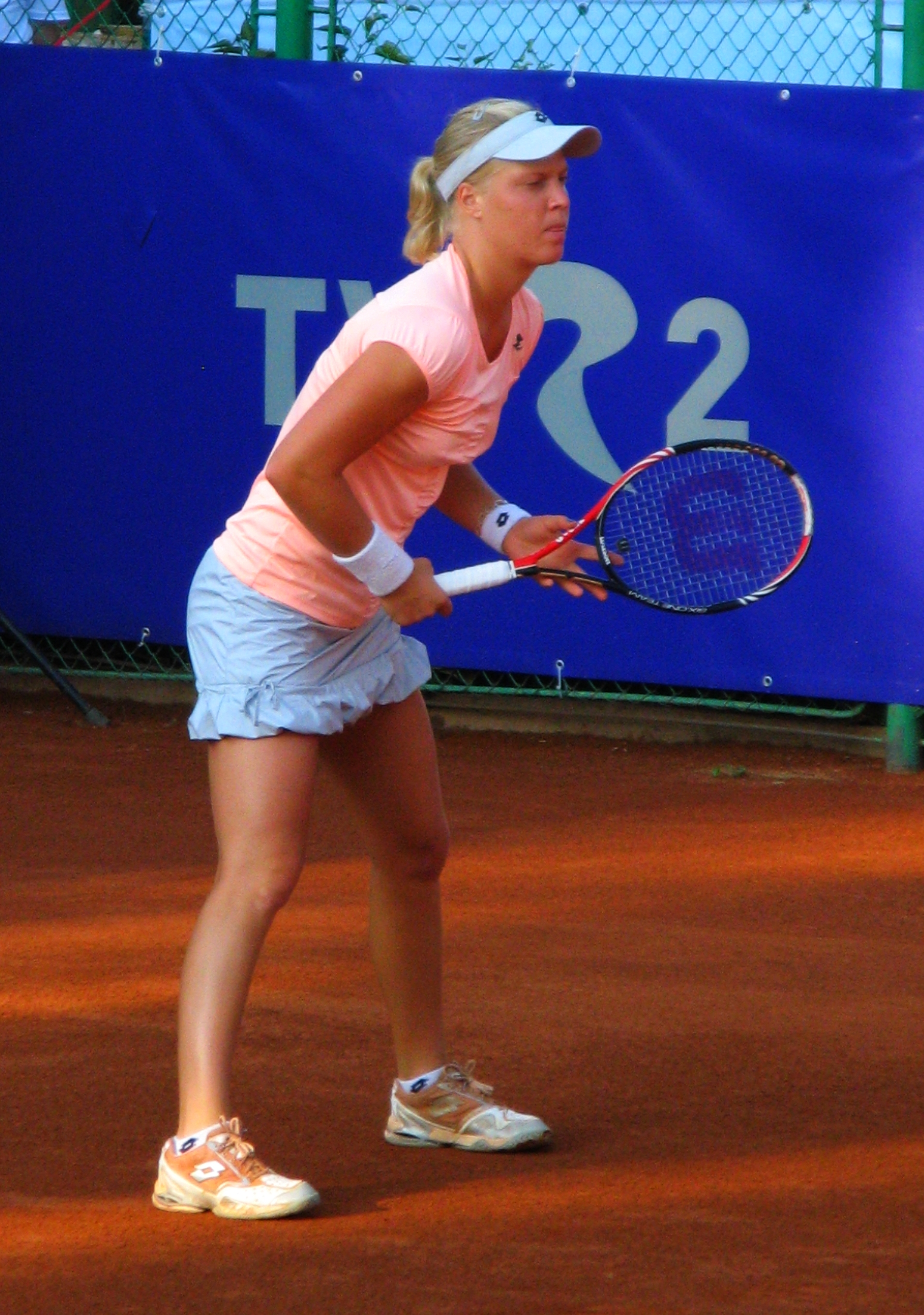
- Maša Zec Peškirič at the 2011 Open Romania Ladies
- Country (sports): Slovenia
- Born: 21 January 1987 (age 39) Jesenice, SFR Yugoslavia
- Turned pro: 2005
- Plays: Right (two-handed backhand)
- Prize money: $361,631

Singles
- Career record: 319–261
- Career titles: 14 ITF
- Highest ranking: No. 93 (15 June 2009)

Grand Slam singles results
- Australian Open: Q3 (2008, 2010)
- French Open: Q2 (2009, 2011)
- Wimbledon: 1R (2009)
- US Open: 1R (2009)

Doubles
- Career record: 143–117
- Career titles: 10 ITF
- Highest ranking: No. 130 (19 October 2009)

Grand Slam doubles results
- Wimbledon: Q1 (2009)

Team competitions
- Fed Cup: 8–22

Maša Zec Peškirič (born 21 January 1987) is a Slovenian former tennis player.

In her career, she won 14 singles titles and ten doubles titles on the ITF Women's Circuit. On 15 June 2009, she reached her best singles ranking of world No. 93. On 19 October 2009, she peaked at No. 130 in the doubles rankings.

Zec Peškirič made her debut for the Slovenia Fed Cup team in April 2006. She has a win–loss record of 8–22 in the competition.

== ITF Circuit finals ==
Legend
$100,000 tournaments
$75,000 tournaments
$50,000 tournaments
$25,000 tournaments
$15,000 tournaments
$10,000 tournaments

=== Singles: 23 (14 titles, 9 runner-ups) ===
Result	No.	Date	Tournament	Surface	Opponent	Score
Win	1.	Aug 2004	Maribor Open, Slovenia	Clay	(Slovenia) Andreja Klepač	6–2, 7–5
Win	2.	Aug 2004	ITF Kranjska Gora, Slovenia	Clay	(Bosnia and Herzegovina) Dijana Stojić	6–4, 6–3
Loss	1.	Oct 2004	ITF Herceg Novi, Montenegro	Clay	(Serbia and Montenegro) Dragana Zarić	6–7^{(4)}, 6–4, 6–7^{(5)}
Win	3.	Nov 2004	ITF Mallorca, Spain	Clay	(Germany) Tatjana Priachin	6–4, 6–3
Loss	2.	Apr 2005	ITF Hvar, Croatia	Clay	(Croatia) Sanja Ančić	3–6, 1–6
Loss	3.	Oct 2005	Lagos Open, Nigeria	Hard	(United Kingdom) Anne Keothavong	3–6, 6–7^{(7)}
Loss	4.	Mar 2007	ITF Kalgoorlie, Australia	Hard	(Australia) Casey Dellacqua	2–6, 4–6
Win	4.	Apr 2007	Open Dinan, France	Clay (i)	(Italy) Karin Knapp	6–4, 6–2
Win	5.	May 2007	ITF Makarska, Croatia	Clay	(Russia) Anastasia Poltoratskaya	6–3, 6–3
Win	6.	Jun 2008	ITF Campobasso, Italy	Clay	(Germany) Anne Schäfer	6–3, 6–3
Win	7.	Aug 2008	Ladies Open Hechingen, Germany	Clay	(Slovakia) Kristína Kučová	3–6, 7–6^{(1)}, 6–3
Win	8.	Sep 2008	Maribor Open, Slovenia	Clay	(Slovakia) Kristína Kučová	6–2, 7–6^{(6)}
Win	9.	Sep 2008	ITF Sarajevo, Bosnia and Herzegovina	Clay	(Slovakia) Klaudia Boczová	6–1, 6–3
Win	10.	Sep 2008	Royal Cup, Montenegro	Clay	(Slovakia) Dominika Nociarová	6–3, 7–6^{(1)}
Loss	5.	May 2009	Zagreb Ladies Open, Croatia	Clay	(Slovenia) Polona Hercog	5–7, 2–6
Loss	6.	Jun 2009	Open de Marseille, France	Clay	(Romania) Raluca Olaru	7–6^{(4)}, 5–7, 4–6
Loss	7.	May 2010	Open de Cagnes-sur-Mer, France	Clay	(Estonia) Kaia Kanepi	3–6, 2–6
Loss	8.	Oct 2010	ITF Cairo, Egypt	Clay	(Liechtenstein) Stephanie Vogt	1–6, 3–6
Loss	9.	Jun 2011	Maribor Open, Slovenia	Clay	(Slovenia) Nastja Kolar	5–7, 4–6
Win	11.	Aug 2012	Ladies Open Hechingen, Germany	Clay	(Bosnia and Herzegovina) Mervana Jugić-Salkić	6–0, 6–4
Win	12.	Mar 2013	ITF Orlando, United States	Clay	(Belgium) Michaela Boev	0–6, 6–4, 6–1
Win	13.	Jul 2013	ITF Aschaffenburg, Germany	Clay	(Slovenia) Dalila Jakupović	6–4, 6–4
Win	14.	Mar 2014	ITF Pula, Italy	Clay	(Ukraine) Sofiya Kovalets	6–4, 6–4

=== Doubles: 25 (10–15) ===
Result	No.	Date	Tournament	Surface	Partner	Opponents	Score
Loss	1.	10 August 2004	ITF Coimbra, Portugal	Hard	(Italy) Alice Balducci	(Argentina) Natalia Garbellotto (Spain) Gabriela Velasco Andreu	4–6, 1–6
Win	1.	23 August 2004	ITF Maribor, Slovenia	Clay	(Slovenia) Alja Zec Peškirič	(Czech Republic) Lucie Kriegsmannová (Czech Republic) Zuzana Zálabská	6–3, 6–3
Win	2.	30 August 2004	ITF Kranjska Gora, Slovenia	Clay	(Slovenia) Polona Reberšak	(Czech Republic) Janette Bejlková (Serbia and Montenegro) Karolina Jovanović	7–6^{(4)}, 6–1
Loss	2.	16 October 2004	ITF Herceg Novi, Montenegro	Clay	(Slovenia) Alja Zec Peškirič	(Serbia and Montenegro) Katarina Mišić (Serbia and Montenegro) Dragana Zarić	1–6, 2–6
Win	3.	14 November 2004	ITF Mallorca, Spain	Clay	(Slovenia) Alja Zec Peškirič	(Denmark) Karina Jacobsgaard (Denmark) Hanne Skak Jensen	6–0, 2–6, 6–3
Loss	3.	10 October 2005	Lagos Open, Nigeria	Hard	(Switzerland) Lisa Sabino	(South Africa) Surina De Beer (Spain) Gabriela Velasco Andreu	4–6, 2–6
Loss	4.	27 August 2006	ITF Maribor, Slovenia	Clay	(Bulgaria) Dia Evtimova	(Romania) Diana Enache (Romania) Antonia Xenia Tout	w/o
Loss	5.	12 September 2006	ITF Sofia, Bulgaria	Clay	(Montenegro) Danica Krstajić	(Croatia) Matea Mezak (Croatia) Nika Ožegović	4–6, 3–6
Loss	6.	28 April 2008	Makarska Open, Croatia	Clay	(Slovenia) Tadeja Majerič	(Slovenia) Polona Hercog (Liechtenstein) Stephanie Vogt	5–7, 2–6
Loss	7.	27 October 2008	Open Nantes Atlantique, France	Hard (i)	(Croatia) Darija Jurak	(Belarus) Ekaterina Dzehalevich (Ukraine) Yuliana Fedak	3–6, 4–6
Win	4.	19 December 2008	Dubai Tennis Challenge, UAE	Hard	(France) Irena Pavlovic	(Russia) Elena Chalova (Russia) Valeria Savinykh	7–6^{(6)}, 3–6, [10–3]
Win	5.	22 March 2009	ITF Redding, United States	Hard	(Belarus) Anna Orlik	(Russia) Alexandra Panova (Japan) Tomoko Yonemura	7–6^{(4)}, 6–4
Win	6.	10 May 2010	Prague Open, Czech Republic	Clay	(Russia) Ksenia Lykina	(Czech Republic) Petra Cetkovská (Czech Republic) Eva Hrdinová	6–3, 6–4
Loss	8.	31 October 2010	ITF Cairo, Egypt	Clay	(Liechtenstein) Stephanie Vogt	(Hungary) Réka Luca Jani (Czech Republic) Martina Kubičíková	7–6^{(4)}, 1–6, [9–11]
Loss	9.	30 April 2012	Chiasso Open, Switzerland	Clay	(Switzerland) Conny Perrin	(Russia) Daria Gavrilova (Russia) Irina Khromacheva	0–6, 6–7^{(1)}
Loss	10.	21 May 2012	ITF Brescia, Italy	Clay	(Croatia) Tereza Mrdeža	(Italy) Corinna Dentoni (Latvia) Diāna Marcinkēviča	2–6, 1–6
Win	7.	23 July 2012	ITF Les Contamines, France	Hard	(Switzerland) Conny Perrin	(Switzerland) Timea Bacsinszky (France) Estelle Guisard	2–6, 6–4, [10–5]
Win	8.	5 November 2012	ITF Benicarló, Spain	Clay	(Switzerland) Conny Perrin	(Venezuela) Andrea Gámiz (Spain) Beatriz García Vidagany	6–4, 6–3
Loss	11.	14 June 2013	ITF Padova, Italy	Clay	(Romania) Cristina Dinu	(Poland) Paula Kania (Russia) Irina Khromacheva	3–6, 1–6
Loss	12.	21 July 2013	ITF Darmstadt, Germany	Clay	(Germany) Christina Shakovets	(Russia) Alexandra Artamonova (Russia) Natela Dzalamidze	3–6, 6–7^{(5)}
Loss	13.	14 September 2013	Royal Cup, Montenegro	Clay	(Czech Republic) Kateřina Vaňková	(Montenegro) Vladica Babić (Croatia) Iva Mekovec	6–4, 6–7^{(1)}, [5–10]
Loss	14.	28 September 2013	Telavi Open, Georgia	Clay	(Germany) Anna Zaja	(Italy) Maria Elena Camerin (Slovenia) Anja Prislan	5–7, 2–6
Win	9.	14 February 2014	ITF Tallinn, Estonia	Hard (i)	(Georgia (country)) Sofia Shapatava	(Hungary) Ágnes Bukta (Bulgaria) Viktoriya Tomova	6–4, 7–6^{(4)}
Loss	15.	15 March 2014	ITF Pula, Italy	Clay	(Germany) Kim Grajdek	(Italy) Martina Caregaro (Italy) Anna Floris	3–6, 7–5, [8–10]
Win	10.	5 April 2014	ITF Jackson, United States	Clay	(South Africa) Chanel Simmonds	(Japan) Erika Sema (Japan) Yurika Sema	6–7^{(5)}, 6–3, [10–5]
