= Eva Hrdinová =

Czech tennis player

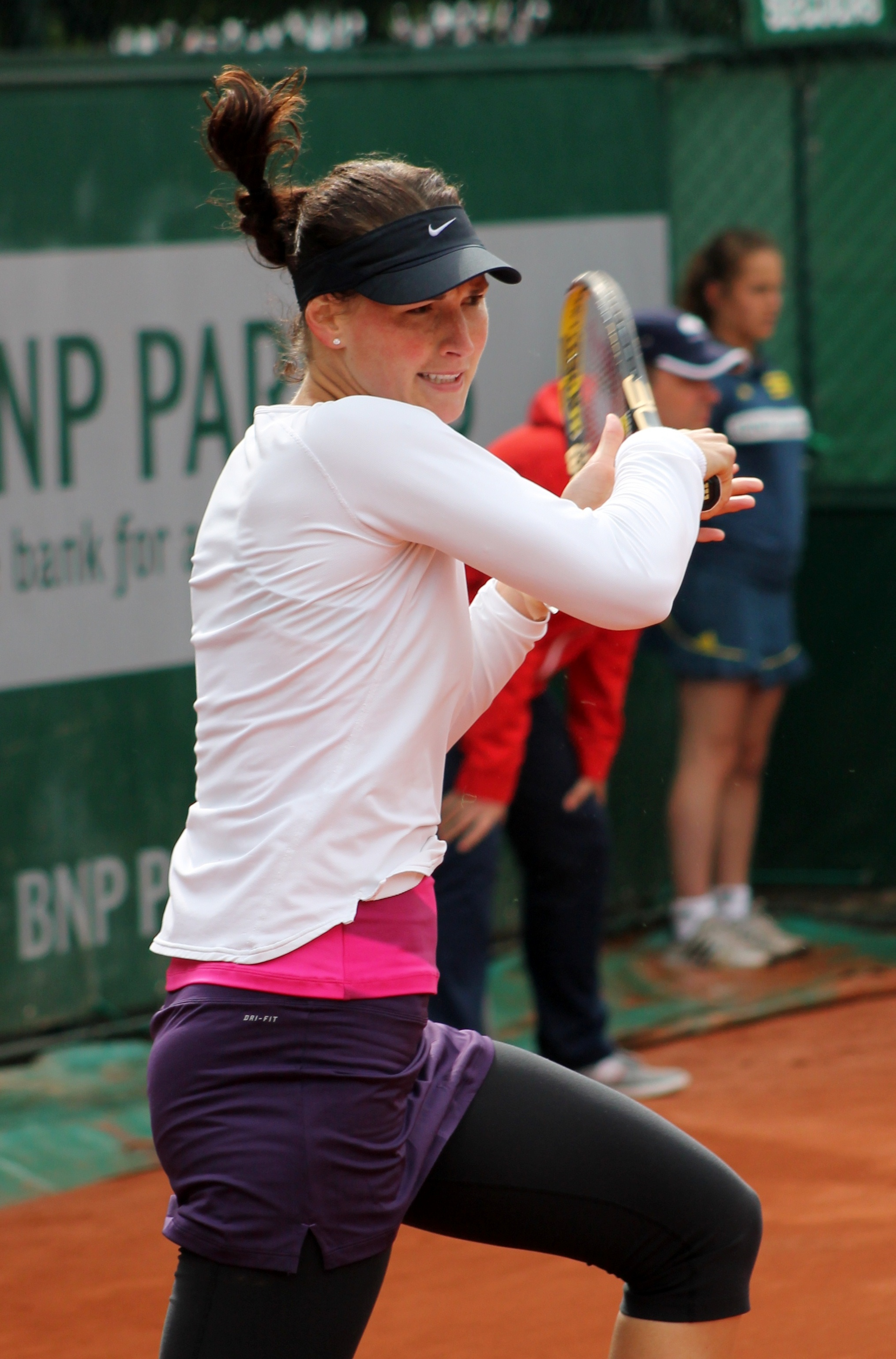
- Hrdinová at the 2013 French Open
- Country (sports): Czech Republic
- Born: 15 June 1984 (age 42) Plzeň, Czechoslovakia
- Height: 1.91 m (6 ft 3 in)
- Coach: Jiří Hrdina
- Prize money: US$ 459,654

Singles
- Career record: 220–199
- Career titles: 3 ITF
- Highest ranking: No. 168 (14 April 2008)

Grand Slam singles results
- Australian Open: Q2 (2005, 2006, 2008)
- French Open: Q1 (2005, 2008, 2010)
- Wimbledon: 1R (2008)
- US Open: 1R (2009)

Doubles
- Career record: 280–219
- Career titles: 19 ITF
- Highest ranking: No. 55 (18 August 2008)

Grand Slam doubles results
- Australian Open: 1R (2009, 2014)
- French Open: 1R (2008, 2009, 2013)
- Wimbledon: 2R (2013, 2014)
- US Open: 1R (2008, 2013, 2015)

Eva Hrdinová (born 15 June 1984) is a Czech former tennis player.

In her career, Hrdinová won three singles titles and 19 doubles titles on the ITF Women's Circuit. On 14 April 2008, she reached her best singles ranking of world No. 168. On 18 August 2008, she peaked at No. 55 in the WTA doubles rankings.

== Performance timelines ==
Key
W	F	SF	QF	#R	RR	Q#	DNQ	A	NH

(W) winner; (F) finalist; (SF) semifinalist; (QF) quarterfinalist; (#R) rounds 4, 3, 2, 1; (RR) round-robin stage; (Q#) qualification round; (DNQ) did not qualify; (A) absent; (NH) not held; (SR) strike rate (events won / competed); (W–L) win–loss record.
To avoid confusion and double counting, these charts are updated at the conclusion of a tournament or when the player's participation has ended.

Only main-draw results in WTA Tour and Grand Slam tournaments, Fed Cup, Olympic Games and Hopman Cup are included in win–loss records.

=== Singles ===
Tournament	2005	2006	2007	2008	2009	2010	SR	W–L	Win %
Grand Slam tournaments
Australian Open	Q2	Q2	A	Q2	Q1	Q1	0 / 0	0–0	–
French Open	Q1	A	A	Q1	A	Q1	0 / 0	0–0	–
Wimbledon	Q1	Q1	A	1R	Q2	A	0 / 1	0–1	0%
US Open	Q1	Q1	Q2	Q1	1R	A	0 / 1	0–1	0%
Win–Loss	0–0	0–0	0–0	0–1	0–1	0–0	0 / 2	0–2	0%
WTA Premier Mandatory & 5 tournaments
Qatar Open	Not Tier I			Q2	Not Held		0 / 0	0–0	–
Dubai Championships	Not Tier I				Q1	A	0 / 0	0–0	–
Career statistics
Tournaments	1	1	0	2	1	1	Career total: 6		
Overall Win–Loss	0–1	0–1	0–0	0–2	0–1	1–1	0 / 6	1–6	14%
Year-end ranking	230	225	195	234	177	320	$459,654		

=== Doubles ===
Tournament	2005	2006	2007	2008	2009	2010	2011	2012	2013	2014	2015	2016	2017	2018	SR	W–L	Win %
Grand Slam tournaments
Australian Open	A	A	A	A	1R	A	A	A	A	1R	A	A	A	A	0 / 2	0–2	0%
French Open	A	A	A	1R	1R	A	A	A	1R	A	A	A	A	A	0 / 3	0–3	0%
Wimbledon	A	A	A	1R	1R	A	A	A	2R	2R	Q1	A	A	1R	0 / 5	2–5	29%
US Open	A	A	A	1R	A	A	A	A	1R	A	1R	A	A	A	0 / 3	0–3	0%
Win–Loss	0–0	0–0	0–0	0–3	0–3	0–0	0–0	0–0	1–3	1–2	0–1	0–0	0–0	0–1	0 / 13	2–13	13%
WTA Premier Mandatory & 5 + former^{†} tournaments
Qatar Open	Not Tier I			2R	Not Held		NTI	A	A	A	NTI	A	NTI	A	0 / 1	1–1	50%
Dubai Championships	Not Tier I				1R	A	A	Not Tier I			A	NTI	A	NTI	0 / 1	0–1	0%
Canadian Open	A	A	A	2R	A	A	A	A	2R	A	A	A	A	A	0 / 2	2–2	50%
Berlin Open^{†}	A	A	A	1R	Not Held										0 / 1	0–1	0%
Kremlin Cup^{†}	A	A	A	1R	Not Tier I										0 / 1	0–1	0%
Win–Loss	0–0	0–0	0–0	2–4	0–1	0–0	0–0	0–0	1–1	0–0	0–0	0–0	0–0	0–0	0 / 6	3–6	33%
Career statistics
Tournaments	2	2	2	15	10	3	0	7	15	14	16	0	5	1	Career total: 92		
Titles	0	0	0	0	0	0	0	0	0	0	0	0	0	0	Career total: 0		
Finals	0	0	0	2	0	0	0	1	0	1	1	0	0	0	Career total: 5		
Overall Win–Loss	1–2	1–2	3–2	11–15	3–10	1–3	0–0	3–7	12–15	8–14	12–16	0–0	0–5	0–1	0 / 92	55–92	37%
Year-end ranking	167	142	110	72	169	242	149	105	75	108	88	-	1224	712			

== WTA Tour finals ==
=== Doubles: 5 (5 runner-ups) ===
Legend Premier (0–2) International (0–3)	Finals by surface Hard (0–2) Clay (0–3)

Result	W–L	Date	Tournament	Tier	Surface	Partner	Opponents	Score
Loss	0–1	Feb 2008	Paris Indoors, France	Premier	Hard (i)	(Czech Republic) Vladimíra Uhlířová	(Ukraine) Alona Bondarenko (Ukraine) Kateryna Bondarenko	1–6, 4–6
Loss	0–2	Jul 2008	LA Championships, United States	Premier	Hard	(Czech Republic) Vladimíra Uhlířová	(Chinese Taipei) Chan Yung-jan (Chinese Taipei) Chuang Chia-jung	6–2, 5–7, [4–10]
Loss	0–3	Jul 2012	Båstad Open, Sweden	International	Clay	(Bosnia and Herzegovina) Mervana Jugić-Salkić	(Colombia) Catalina Castaño (Colombia) Mariana Duque Mariño	6–4, 5–7, [5–10]
Loss	0–4	May 2014	Oeiras Open, Portugal	International	Clay	(Russia) Valeriya Solovyeva	(Zimbabwe) Cara Black (India) Sania Mirza	4–6, 3–6
Loss	0–5	May 2015	Prague Open, Czech Republic	International	Clay	(Ukraine) Kateryna Bondarenko	(Switzerland) Belinda Bencic (Czech Republic) Kateřina Siniaková	2–6, 2–6

== ITF Circuit finals ==
Legend
$100,000 tournaments
$75,000 tournaments
$50,000 tournaments
$25,000 tournaments
$10,000 tournaments

=== Singles: 12 (3–9) ===
Result	No.	Date	Tournament	Tier	Surface	Opponent	Score
Loss	1.	Aug 2002	ITF Valašské Meziříčí, Czech Republic	10,000	Clay	(Czech Republic) Lenka Novotná	6–7^{(8–10)} 0–6
Loss	2.	Mar 2004	ITF Buchen, Germany	10,000	Hard	(United Kingdom) Amanda Keen	3–6, 2–6
Win	3.	6 June 2004	Palić Open, Serbia	10,000	Clay	(Serbia) Andrea Popović	6–0, 3–6, 6–0
Win	4.	3 August 2004	Ladies Open Hechingen, Germany	25,000	Clay	(Italy) Nathalie Viérin	6–4, 6–3
Loss	5.	28 February 2005	ITF Buchen, Germany	10,000	Hard	(Bosnia and Herzegovina) Mervana Jugić-Salkić	2–6, 0–2 ret.
Loss	6.	17 December 2005	ITF Valašské Meziříčí, Czech Republic	25,000	Hard (i)	(Estonia) Margit Rüütel	0–6, 2–6
Loss	7.	Mar 2007	ITF Minsk, Belarus	25,000	Carpet (i)	(Belarus) Olga Govortsova	7–6^{(7–5)}, 2–6, 3–6
Win	8.	Jun 2007	ITF Périgueux, France	25,000	Clay	(Ukraine) Yuliya Beygelzimer	3–6, 6–3, 6–4
Loss	9.	Nov 2008	ITF Minsk, Belarus	50,000	Hard (i)	(Russia) Alisa Kleybanova	1–6, 6–4, 2–6
Loss	10.	May 2009	Soweto Open, South Africa	100,000	Hard	(Latvia) Anastasija Sevastova	2–6, 2–6
Loss	11.	Feb 2011	ITF Zell am Harmersbach, Germany	10,000	Carpet (i)	(Germany) Nina Zander	7–6^{(7–3)}, 5–7, 1–6
Loss	12.	25 February 2012	ITF Helsingborg, Sweden	10,000	Carpet (i)	(Netherlands) Quirine Lemoine	4–6, 4–6

=== Doubles: 39 (19–20) ===
Result	No.	Date	Tournament	Tier	Surface	Partner	Opponents	Score
Win	1.	25 August 2003	ITF Bielefeld, Germany	10,000	Clay	(Germany) Claudia Kardys	(Germany) Carmen Klaschka (Germany) Sabine Klaschka	2–6, 6–4, 7–6^{(5)}
Win	2.	19 October 2003	ITF Valencia, Venezuela	10,000	Hard	(Czech Republic) Zuzana Černá	(Argentina) Soledad Esperón (Argentina) Flavia Mignola	6–3, 4–6, 6–1
Win	3.	26 October 2003	ITF Caracas, Venezuela	10,000	Hard	(Czech Republic) Zuzana Černá	(Argentina) María José Argeri (Brazil) Letícia Sobral	w/o
Win	4.	7 March 2004	ITF Buchen, Germany	10,000	Hard (i)	(Czech Republic) Lucie Hradecká	(Belgium) Elke Clijsters (Belgium) Caroline Maes	6–1, 6–4
Loss	5.	10 July 2004	Internazionali di Cuneo, Italy	50,000	Clay	(Czech Republic) Sandra Záhlavová	(United States) Edina Gallovits (Hungary) Zsófia Gubacsi	5–7, 3–6
Win	6.	18 July 2004	ITF Brussels, Belgium	10,000	Hard (i)	(Czech Republic) Zuzana Černá	(Belgium) Leslie Butkiewicz (Belgium) Eveline Vanhyfte	7–6^{(3)}, 7–6^{(5)}
Win	7.	28 November 2004	ITF Opole, Poland	25,000	Carpet (i)	(Czech Republic) Lucie Hradecká	(Belarus) Ekaterina Dzehalevich (Belarus) Nadejda Ostrovskaya	7–5, 6–3
Loss	8.	19 December 2004	ITF Valašské Meziříčí, Czech Republic	25,000	Hard (i)	(Czech Republic) Lucie Hradecká	(Austria) Daniela Klemenschits (Austria) Sandra Klemenschits	w/o
Loss	9.	15 November 2005	Czech Indoor Open, Czech Republic	25,000	Hard (i)	(Czech Republic) Olga Vymetálková	(Czech Republic) Lucie Hradecká (Czech Republic) Libuše Průšová	3–6, 6–3, 3–6
Loss	10.	24 February 2006	ITF St. Paul, US	50,000	Hard (i)	(Czech Republic) Michaela Paštiková	(United States) Julie Ditty (Venezuela) Milagros Sequera	6–4, 6–7^{(5)}, 2–6
Loss	11.	25 April 2006	ITF Lafayette, US	50,000	Clay	(Ukraine) Yuliana Fedak	(Venezuela) Milagros Sequera (Czech Republic) Hana Šromová	6–2, 1–6, 1–6
Loss	12.	15 November 2006	Přerov Cup, Czech Republic	25,000	Hard (i)	(Slovakia) Stanislava Hrozenská	(Czech Republic) Nikola Fraňková (Czech Republic) Andrea Hlaváčková	2–6, 7–6^{(5)}, 3–6
Loss	13.	4 February 2007	ITF Belfort, France	25,000	Carpet (i)	(Czech Republic) Veronika Chvojková	(France) Iryna Brémond (Israel) Yevgenia Savransky	3–6, 5–7
Win	14.	14 April 2007	ITF Jackson, US	25,000	Clay	(Czech Republic) Michaela Paštiková	(Japan) Junri Namigata (Japan) Yurika Sema	7–6^{(5)}, 7–6^{(3)}
Win	15.	3 June 2007	ITF Galatina, Italy	25,000	Clay	(Canada) Marie-Ève Pelletier	(Italy) Stefania Chieppa (Belarus) Darya Kustova	6–1, 7–6^{(4)}
Win	16.	30 June 2007	ITF Périgueux, France	25,000	Clay	(Canada) Marie-Ève Pelletier	(Ukraine) Yulia Beygelzimer (Ukraine) Yevgenia Savranska	3–6, 7–5, 6–2
Win	17.	3 September 2007	Open Denain, France	75,000	Clay	(Canada) Marie-Ève Pelletier	(Switzerland) Timea Bacsinszky (Poland) Karolina Kosińska	6–4, 6–4
Win	18.	24 September 2007	ITF Ashland, US	50,000	Hard	(Brazil) Maria Fernanda Alves	(Estonia) Maret Ani (Germany) Sandra Klösel	7–6^{(5)}, 6–2
Loss	19.	1 October 2007	Classic of Troy, US	50,000	Hard	(Canada) Marie-Ève Pelletier	(United States) Angela Haynes (United States) Mashona Washington	4–6, 2–6
Loss	20.	8 November 2009	Ismaning Open, Germany	50,000	Carpet (i)	(Belarus) Ekaterina Dzehalevich	(Greece) Eleni Daniilidou (Germany) Jasmin Wöhr	2–6, 6–4, [5–10]
Loss	21.	10 May 2010	Prague Open, Czech Republic	50,000	Clay	(Czech Republic) Petra Cetkovská	(Russia) Ksenia Lykina (Slovenia) Maša Zec Peškirič	3–6, 4–6
Win	22.	11 June 2010	ITF Szczecin, Poland	25,000	Clay	(Czech Republic) Petra Cetkovská	(Ukraine) Veronika Kapshay (Germany) Justine Ozga	7–6^{(5)}, 6–3
Win	23.	1 February 2011	ITF Rabat, Morocco	25,000	Clay	(Italy) Karin Knapp	(Czech Republic) Iveta Gerlová (Czech Republic) Lucie Kriegsmannová	6–4, 6–1
Loss	24.	10 April 2011	ITF Jackson, US	25,000	Clay	(France) Natalie Piquion	(Canada) Sharon Fichman (Canada) Marie-Ève Pelletier	6–7^{(1)}, 6–7^{(3)}
Win	25.	16 July 2011	ITF Woking, UK	25,000	Hard	(France) Julie Coin	(Finland) Emma Laine (United Kingdom) Melanie South	6–1, 3–6, [10–8]
Win	26.	24 July 2011	ITF Les Contamines, France	25,000	Hard	(France) Julie Coin	(Croatia) Maria Abramović (Italy) Nicole Clerico	6–3, 6–2
Win	27.	28 August 2011	ITF İstanbul, Turkey	50,000	Hard	(France) Julie Coin	(Austria) Sandra Klemenschits (France) Irena Pavlovic	6–4, 7–5
Loss	28.	10 September 2011	ITF Saransk, Russia	50,000	Clay	(Ukraine) Veronika Kapshay	(Romania) Mihaela Buzărnescu (Serbia) Teodora Mirčić	3–6, 1–6
Win	29.	9 October 2011	ITF Kansas City, US	50,000	Hard	(Croatia) Maria Abramović	(United States) Jamie Hampton (Croatia) Ajla Tomljanović	2–6, 6–2, [10–4]
Loss	30.	6 November 2011	Open Nantes Atlantique, France	50,000	Hard (i)	(France) Julie Coin	(France) Stéphanie Foretz (France) Kristina Mladenovic	0–6, 4–6
Loss	31.	28 January 2012	Open Andrézieux-Bouthéon, France	25,000	Hard (i)	(France) Julie Coin	(Czech Republic) Karolína Plíšková (Czech Republic) Kristýna Plíšková	4–6, 6–4, [5–10]
Win	32.	2 July 2012	Internazionali di Biella, Italy	100,000	Clay	(Bosnia and Herzegovina) Mervana Jugić-Salkić	(Austria) Sandra Klemenschits (Germany) Tatjana Maria	1–6, 6–3, [10–8]
Loss	33.	22 October 2012	Ismaning Open, Germany	75,000	Carpet (i)	(United States) Jill Craybas	(Switzerland) Romina Oprandi (Switzerland) Amra Sadiković	6–4, 3–6, [7–10]
Loss	34.	30 November 2012	Dubai Tennis Challenge, United Arab Emirates	75,000	Hard	(Czech Republic) Karolína Plíšková	(Italy) Maria Elena Camerin (Russia) Vera Dushevina	5–7, 3–6
Loss	35.	31 March 2013	Open de Seine-et-Marne, France	50,000	Hard (i)	(France) Stéphanie Foretz Gacon	(Germany) Anna-Lena Friedsam (Belgium) Alison Van Uytvanck	3–6, 4–6
Loss	36.	May 2013	Prague Open, Czech Republic	100,000	Clay	(United States) Irina Falconi	(Czech Republic) Renata Voráčová (Czech Republic) Barbora Strýcová	4–6, 0–6
Loss	37.	Mar 2013	Open Nantes Atlantique, France	50,000	Hard (i)	(France) Stéphanie Foretz Gacon	(Czech Republic) Lucie Hradecká (Netherlands) Michaëlla Krajicek	3–6, 2–6
Loss	38.	3 November 2013	The Oaks Club Challenger, US	50,000	Clay	(United States) Irina Falconi	(Chinese Taipei) Hsieh Shu-ying (Japan) Rika Fujiwara	3–6, 7–6^{(5)}, [4–10]
Win	39.	Jul 2015	Reinert Open, Germany	50,000	Clay	(Israel) Shahar Pe'er	(Ukraine) Alona Fomina (Ukraine) Sofiya Kovalets	6–1, 6–3
