= Lucie Šafářová career statistics =

Career finals
Discipline	Type	Won	Lost	Total
Singles	Grand Slam	0	1	1
Singles	WTA Finals (Note: Formerly known as WTA Tour Championships until 2014.)	–	–	–
Singles	Premier Mandatory & 5	–	–	–
Singles	Premier	1	4	5
Singles	International	6	5	11
Singles	Olympics	–	–	–
Singles	Total	7	10	17
Doubles	Grand Slam	5	0	5
Doubles	WTA Finals	0	1	1
Doubles	Premier Mandatory & 5	5	0	5
Doubles	Premier	5	2	7
Doubles	International	0	3	3
Doubles	Olympics	–	–	–
Doubles	Total	15	6	21

This list summarizes the main career statistics of the Czech professional tennis player Lucie Šafářová. Šafářová won seven WTA singles titles and fifteen WTA doubles titles, including five Grand Slam doubles titles with Bethanie Mattek-Sands, at the 2015 Australian Open and French Open, the 2016 US Open, and the 2017 Australian Open and French Open. In the singles, highlights of Šafářová's career include winning the 2015 Qatar Total Open, reaching the final of the 2015 French Open and making quarter-final and semi-final appearances at the 2007 Australian Open and 2014 Wimbledon Championships respectively. Šafářová achieved her highest singles rankings of No. 5 on 14 September 2015 and her world No. 1 ranking in doubles on 21 August 2017.

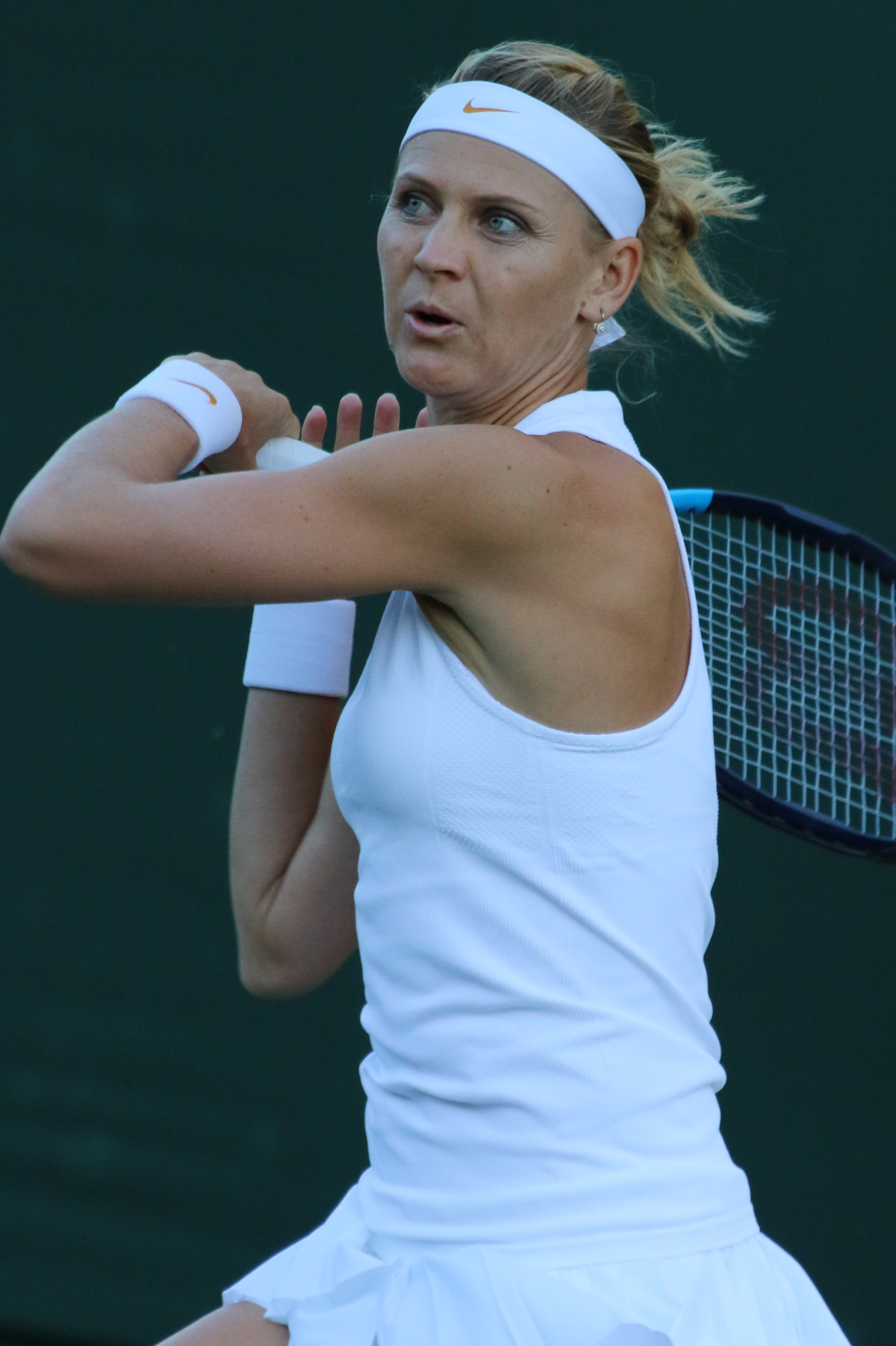
Šafářová at the 2018 Wimbledon Championships.

== Performance timelines ==
Key
W	F	SF	QF	#R	RR	Q#	P#	DNQ	A	Z#	PO	G	S	B	NMS	NTI	P	NH

(W) winner; (F) finalist; (SF) semifinalist; (QF) quarterfinalist; (#R) rounds 4, 3, 2, 1; (RR) round-robin stage; (Q#) qualification round; (P#) preliminary round; (DNQ) did not qualify; (A) absent; (Z#) Davis/Fed Cup Zonal Group (with number indication) or (PO) play-off; (G) gold, (S) silver or (B) bronze Olympic/Paralympic medal; (NMS) not a Masters tournament; (NTI) not a Tier I tournament; (P) postponed; (NH) not held; (SR) strike rate (events won / competed); (W–L) win–loss record.

Only main-draw results in WTA Tour, Grand Slam tournaments, Fed Cup, Hopman Cup and Olympic Games are included in win–loss records.

=== Singles ===
Tournament	2004	2005	2006	2007	2008	2009	2010	2011	2012	2013	2014	2015	2016	2017	2018	SR	W–L	Win%
Grand Slam tournaments
Australian Open	A	Q1	1R	QF	1R	3R	1R	3R	1R	2R	3R	1R	A	2R	3R	0 / 12	14–12	54%
French Open	A	1R	1R	4R	2R	2R	2R	2R	2R	1R	4R	F	3R	1R	2R	0 / 14	20–14	59%
Wimbledon	A	1R	A	3R	1R	1R	1R	2R	1R	2R	SF	4R	4R	2R	3R	0 / 13	18–13	58%
US Open	Q2	1R	2R	3R	1R	1R	1R	3R	3R	2R	4R	1R	2R	4R	2R	0 / 14	16–14	53%
Win–Loss	0–0	0–3	1–3	11–4	1–4	3–4	1–4	6–4	3–4	3–4	13–4	9–4	6–3	5–4	6–4	0 / 53	68–53	56%
Year-end championship
WTA Finals	A	A	A	A	A	A	A	A	A	A	A	RR	A	A	A	0 / 1	1–2	33%
National representation
Fed Cup	A	A	PO	PO	PO	SF	SF	W	W	SF	W	W	A	A	A	4 / 7	13–11	54%
Summer Olympics	A	Not Held			3R	Not Held			1R	Not Held			2R	Not Held		0 / 3	3–3	50%
WTA Premier Mandatory & 5 + former^{†} tournaments
Qatar Open	Not Tier I				A	Not Held		NTI	QF	2R	3R	NTI	A	NTI	1R	0 / 4	6–4	60%
Dubai Championships	Not Tier I					A	A	1R	Not Tier I			QF	NTI	A	NTI	0 / 2	3–2	60%
Indian Wells Open	A	A	3R	3R	2R	2R	1R	2R	4R	2R	3R	3R	2R	3R	A	0 / 12	10–12	45%
Miami Open	A	A	2R	3R	3R	2R	3R	3R	2R	2R	3R	2R	2R	QF	A	0 / 12	12–12	50%
Madrid Open	Not Held					3R	SF	QF	3R	1R	3R	QF	2R	1R	A	0 / 9	17–9	65%
Italian Open	A	A	2R	A	1R	2R	QF	2R	A	A	A	2R	2R	1R	A	0 / 8	8–8	50%
Canadian Open	A	1R	2R	2R	A	QF	1R	QF	SF	1R	3R	2R	1R	QF	2R	0 / 13	18–13	58%
Cincinnati Open	Not Tier I					2R	1R	2R	1R	1R	3R	QF	1R	1R	A	0 / 9	6–9	40%
Wuhan Open	Not Held										1R	A	2R	A	A	0 / 2	1–2	60%
China Open	Not Tier I					2R	1R	1R	1R	QF	3R	A	1R	A	A	0 / 7	6–7	46%
Pan Pacific Open^{†}	A	A	A	A	A	3R	2R	A	3R	QF	Not Tier I					0 / 4	8–4	60%
Career statistics
	2004	2005	2006	2007	2008	2009	2010	2011	2012	2013	2014	2015	2016	2017	2018	SR	W–L	Win%
Tournaments	0	11	22	16	21	23	23	23	23	23	23	21	20	19	11	Career total: 279		
Titles	0	2	1	0	1	0	0	0	0	1	0	1	1	0	0	Career total: 7		
Finals	0	3	1	1	1	1	1	2	1	1	0	3	1	1	0	Career total: 17		
Hard Win–Loss	0–0	6–5	11–15	17–11	11–11	27–16	12–15	29–19	20–16	18–14	24–15	18–14	3–11	25–11	4–7	5 / 180	226–180	56%
Clay Win–Loss	0–0	5–2	10–8	10–4	6–8	6–6	14–7	5–5	7–3	6–8	10–5	11–5	9–4	3–4	2–2	2 / 71	104–71	59%
Grass Win–Loss	0–0	4–2	0–0	3–2	0–1	0–1	1–2	1–2	2–3	3–2	5–3	3–2	3–3	7–3	4–2	0 / 28	36–28	56%
Overall Win–Loss	0–0	15–9	21–23	30–17	17–20	34–23	27–24	35–26	29–22	27–24	39–23	32–21	15–18	35–18	10–11	7 / 279	366–279	57%
Win %	–	63%	48%	64%	46%	60%	53%	57%	57%	53%	63%	60%	45%	66%	48%	Career total: 57%		
Year-end ranking (Note: 2003: WTA ranking – 533.)	185	50	41	24	65	42	33	25	17	29	17	9	64	30	106	$12,637,555		

=== Doubles ===
Tournament	2005	2006	2007	2008	2009	2010	2011	2012	2013	2014	2015	2016	2017	2018	2019	SR	W–L	Win%
Grand Slam tournaments
Australian Open	A	1R	1R	A	3R	1R	2R	1R	QF	QF	W	A	W	QF	A	2 / 11	23–9	72%
French Open	A	1R	1R	1R	2R	2R	3R	1R	QF	1R	W	1R	W	2R	1R	2 / 14	20–12	63%
Wimbledon	1R	A	1R	1R	1R	2R	1R	1R	1R	QF	QF	1R	2R	QF	A	0 / 13	11–12	48%
US Open	1R	1R	1R	2R	1R	2R	1R	1R	3R	2R	A	W	SF	2R	A	1 / 13	15–12	56%
Win–Loss	0–2	0–3	0–4	1–3	3–4	3–4	3–4	0–4	8–4	7–4	15–1	6–2	16–1	7–4	0–1	5 / 49	65–43	60%
Year-end championship
WTA Finals	Did Not Qualify										RR	F	A	DNQ		0 / 2	3–2	60%
National representation
Summer Olympics	Not Held			1R	Not Held			1R	Not Held			SF-B	Not Held			0 / 3	4–3	57%
WTA Premier Mandatory & 5 + former^{†} tournaments
Qatar Open	Not Tier I			SF	Not Held		NTI	A	QF	1R	NTI	A	NTI	2R	A	0 / 4	5–4	50%
Dubai Championships	Not Tier I				A	A	A	Not Tier I			1R	NTI	A	NTI	A	0 / 1	0–1	50%
Indian Wells Open	A	A	A	A	A	1R	A	A	1R	1R	1R	1R	SF	A	A	0 / 6	3–6	33%
Miami Open	A	A	A	A	A	A	A	QF	2R	1R	A	W	2R	A	A	1 / 5	9–4	69%
Madrid Open	Not Held				A	A	A	2R	W	QF	SF	A	2R	A	A	1 / 5	11–4	73%
Italian Open	A	A	A	A	1R	A	A	A	A	A	QF	2R	A	A	A	0 / 3	2–3	40%
Canadian Open	A	A	A	A	A	A	A	2R	1R	2R	W	1R	SF	1R	A	1 / 7	8–6	57%
Cincinnati Open	Not Tier I				1R	A	A	A	2R	QF	2R	A	SF	1R	A	0 / 6	6–6	50%
Wuhan Open	Not Held									A	A	W	A	A	A	1 / 1	5–0	86%
China Open	Not Tier I				A	A	A	A	2R	A	A	W	A	A	A	1 / 2	6–1	86%
Pan Pacific Open^{†}	A	A	A	A	A	A	A	QF	A	Not Tier I						0 / 1	1–1	86%
Career statistics
	2005	2006	2007	2008	2009	2010	2011	2012	2013	2014	2015	2016	2017	2018	2019	SR	W–L	Win %
Tournaments	4	5	4	10	14	7	8	15	18	18	12	15	12	10	3	Career total: 139		
Titles	0	0	0	0	0	0	0	1	2	1	4	4	3	0	0	Career total: 15		
Finals	0	0	0	1	0	0	0	1	2	1	4	6	3	1	1	Career total: 20		
Overall Win–Loss	0–4	0–5	0–4	7–10	6–13	3–7	5–8	12–14	27–15	19–17	30–8	32–11	31–6	14–10	4–3	15 / 139	190–135	58%
Year-end ranking	511	785	881	91	120	149	134	59	18	29	4	7	6					

== Grand Slam tournament finals ==
=== Singles: 1 (runner-up) ===
Result	Year	Tournament	Surface	Opponent	Score
Loss	2015	French Open	Clay	(United States) Serena Williams	3–6, 7–6^{(7–2)}, 2–6

=== Doubles: 5 (5 titles) ===
Result	Year	Tournament	Surface	Partner	Opponents	Score
Win	2015	Australian Open	Hard	(United States) Bethanie Mattek-Sands	(Chinese Taipei) Chan Yung-jan (China) Zheng Jie	6–4, 7–6^{(7–5)}
Win	2015	French Open	Clay	(United States) Bethanie Mattek-Sands	(Kazakhstan) Yaroslava Shvedova (Australia) Casey Dellacqua	3–6, 6–4, 6–2
Win	2016	US Open	Hard	(United States) Bethanie Mattek-Sands	(France) Caroline Garcia (France) Kristina Mladenovic	2–6, 7–6^{(7–5)}, 6–4
Win	2017	Australian Open (2)	Hard	(United States) Bethanie Mattek-Sands	(Czech Republic) Andrea Hlaváčková (China) Peng Shuai	6–7^{(4–7)}, 6–3, 6–3
Win	2017	French Open (2)	Clay	(United States) Bethanie Mattek-Sands	(Australia) Ashleigh Barty (Australia) Casey Dellacqua	6–2, 6–1

== Other significant finals ==
=== Year-end championships ===
==== Doubles: 1 (runner-up) ====
Result	Year	Tournament	Surface	Partner	Opponent	Score
Loss	2016	WTA Finals, Singapore	Hard (i)	(United States) Bethanie Mattek-Sands	(Russia) Ekaterina Makarova (Russia) Elena Vesnina	6–7^{(5–7)}, 3–6

=== Summer Olympics ===
==== Doubles: 1 (bronze medal) ====
Result	Year	Tournament	Surface	Partner	Opponents	Score
Bronze	2016	Rio Olympics	Hard	(Czech Republic) Barbora Strýcová	(Czech Republic) Andrea Hlaváčková; (Czech Republic) Lucie Hradecká	7–5, 6–1

=== WTA Premier Mandatory & 5 tournaments ===
==== Doubles: 5 (5 titles) ====
Result	Year	Tournament	Surface	Partner	Opponents	Score
Win	2013	Madrid Open	Clay	(Russia) Anastasia Pavlyuchenkova	(Zimbabwe) Cara Black; (New Zealand) Marina Erakovic	6–2, 6–4
Win	2015	Canadian Open	Hard	(United States) Bethanie Mattek-Sands	(France) Caroline Garcia; (Slovenia) Katarina Srebotnik	6–1, 6–2
Win	2016	Miami Open	Hard	(United States) Bethanie Mattek-Sands	(Hungary) Tímea Babos; (Kazakhstan) Yaroslava Shvedova	6–3, 6–4
Win	2016	Wuhan Open	Hard	(United States) Bethanie Mattek-Sands	(India) Sania Mirza (Czech Republic) Barbora Strýcová	6–1, 6–4
Win	2016	China Open	Hard	(United States) Bethanie Mattek-Sands	(France) Caroline Garcia (France) Kristina Mladenovic	6–4, 6–4

== WTA Tour finals ==
=== Singles: 17 (7 titles, 10 runner-ups) ===
Legend Grand Slam (0–1) Tier II / Premier (1–4) Tier III & IV / International (6–5)	Finals by surface Hard (4–5) Clay (2–2) Grass (0–1) Carpet (1–2)

Result	W–L	Date	Tournament	Tier	Surface	Opponent	Score
Win	1–0	May 2005	Estoril Open, Portugal	Tier IV	Clay	(China) Li Na	6–7^{(4–7)}, 6–4, 6–3
Loss	1–1	Jun 2005	Rosmalen Open, Netherlands	Tier III	Grass	(Czech Republic) Klára Zakopalová	6–3, 2–6, 2–6
Win	2–1	Aug 2005	Forest Hills Classic, United States	Tier IV	Hard	(India) Sania Mirza	3–6, 7–5, 6–4
Win	3–1	Jan 2006	Gold Coast Championships, Australia	Tier III	Hard	(Italy) Flavia Pennetta	6–3, 6–4
Loss	3–2	Feb 2007	Open GDF Suez, France	Tier II	Carpet (i)	(Russia) Nadia Petrova	6–4, 1–6, 4–6
Win	4–2	Aug 2008	Forest Hills Classic, United States	Tier IV	Hard	(China) Peng Shuai	6–4, 6–2
Loss	4–3	Sep 2009	Tournoi de Québec, Canada	International	Carpet (i)	(Hungary) Melinda Czink	6–4, 3–6, 5–7
Loss	4–4	Feb 2010	Open GDF Suez, France	Premier	Hard (i)	(Russia) Elena Dementieva	7–6^{(7–5)}, 1–6, 4–6
Loss	4–5	Mar 2011	Malaysian Open, Malaysia	International	Hard	(Australia) Jelena Dokić	6–2, 6–7^{(9–11)}, 4–6
Loss	4–6	Jun 2011	Danish Open, Denmark	International	Hard (i)	(Denmark) Caroline Wozniacki	1–6, 4–6
Loss	4–7	Apr 2012	Charleston Open, United States	Premier	Clay (green)	(United States) Serena Williams	0–6, 1–6
Win	5–7	Sep 2013	Tournoi de Québec, Canada	International	Carpet (i)	(New Zealand) Marina Erakovic	6–4, 6–3
Win	6–7	Feb 2015	Qatar Ladies Open, Qatar	Premier	Hard	(Belarus) Victoria Azarenka	6–4, 6–3
Loss	6–8	Jun 2015	French Open, France	Grand Slam	Clay	(United States) Serena Williams	3–6, 7–6^{(7–2)}, 2–6
Loss	6–9	Aug 2015	Connecticut Open, United States	Premier	Hard	(Czech Republic) Petra Kvitová	7–6^{(8–6)}, 2–6, 2–6
Win	7–9	Apr 2016	Prague Open, Czech Republic	International	Clay	(Australia) Samantha Stosur	3–6, 6–1, 6–4
Loss	7–10	Feb 2017	Hungarian Open, Hungary	International	Hard (i)	(Hungary) Tímea Babos	7–6^{(7–4)}, 4–6, 3–6

=== Doubles: 21 (15 titles, 6 runner-ups) ===
Legend Grand Slam (5–0) WTA Finals (0–1) Premier M & Premier 5 (5–0) Premier (5–2) Tier IV / International / WTA 250 (0–3)	Finals by surface Hard (8–2) Clay (7–3) Grass (0–1)

Result	W–L	Date	Tournament	Tier	Surface	Partner	Opponent	Score
Loss	0–1	Aug 2008	Nordic Light Open, Sweden	Tier IV	Hard	(Czech Republic) Petra Cetkovská	(Czech Republic) Iveta Benešová (Czech Republic) Barbora Strýcová	5–7, 4–6
Win	1–1	Apr 2012	Charleston Open, United States	Premier	Clay (green)	(Russia) Anastasia Pavlyuchenkova	(Spain) Anabel Medina Garrigues; (Kazakhstan) Yaroslava Shvedova	5–7, 6–4, [10–6]
Win	2–1	Apr 2013	Charleston Open, United States (2)	Premier	Clay (green)	(France) Kristina Mladenovic	(Czech Republic) Andrea Hlaváčková; (United States) Liezel Huber	6–3, 7–6^{(8–6)}
Win	3–1	May 2013	Madrid Open, Spain	Premier M	Clay	(Russia) Anastasia Pavlyuchenkova	(Zimbabwe) Cara Black; (New Zealand) Marina Erakovic	6–2, 6–4
Win	4–1	Jan 2014	Sydney International, Australia	Premier	Hard	(Hungary) Tímea Babos	(Italy) Sara Errani; (Italy) Roberta Vinci	7–5, 3–6, [10–7]
Win	5–1	Jan 2015	Australian Open, Australia	Grand Slam	Hard	(United States) Bethanie Mattek-Sands	(Chinese Taipei) Chan Yung-jan; (China) Zheng Jie	6–4, 7–6^{(7–5)}
Win	6–1	Apr 2015	Stuttgart Open, Germany	Premier	Clay (i)	(United States) Bethanie Mattek-Sands	(France) Caroline Garcia; (Slovenia) Katarina Srebotnik	6–4, 6–3
Win	7–1	Jun 2015	French Open, France	Grand Slam	Clay	(United States) Bethanie Mattek-Sands	(Kazakhstan) Yaroslava Shvedova (Australia) Casey Dellacqua	3–6, 6–4, 6–2
Win	8–1	Aug 2015	Canadian Open, Canada	Premier 5	Hard	(United States) Bethanie Mattek-Sands	(France) Caroline Garcia (Slovenia) Katarina Srebotnik	6–1, 6–2
Win	9–1	Apr 2016	Miami Open, United States	Premier M	Hard	(United States) Bethanie Mattek-Sands	(Hungary) Tímea Babos (Kazakhstan) Yaroslava Shvedova	6–3, 6–4
Loss	9–2	Apr 2016	Charleston Open, United States	Premier	Clay (green)	(United States) Bethanie Mattek-Sands	(France) Caroline Garcia (France) Kristina Mladenovic	2–6, 5–7
Win	10–2	Sep 2016	US Open, United States	Grand Slam	Hard	(United States) Bethanie Mattek-Sands	(France) Caroline Garcia (France) Kristina Mladenovic	2–6, 7–6^{(7–5)}, 6–4
Win	11–2	Oct 2016	Wuhan Open, China	Premier 5	Hard	(United States) Bethanie Mattek-Sands	(India) Sania Mirza (Czech Republic) Barbora Strýcová	6–1, 6–4
Win	12–2	Oct 2016	China Open, China	Premier M	Hard	(United States) Bethanie Mattek-Sands	(France) Caroline Garcia (France) Kristina Mladenovic	6–4, 6–4
Loss	12–3	Oct 2016	WTA Finals, Singapore	Finals	Hard (i)	(United States) Bethanie Mattek-Sands	(Russia) Ekaterina Makarova; (Russia) Elena Vesnina	6–7^{(5–7)}, 3–6
Win	13–3	Jan 2017	Australian Open, Australia (2)	Grand Slam	Hard	(United States) Bethanie Mattek-Sands	(Czech Republic) Andrea Hlaváčková (China) Peng Shuai	6–7^{(4–7)}, 6–3, 6–3
Win	14–3	Apr 2017	Charleston Open, United States (3)	Premier	Clay	(United States) Bethanie Mattek-Sands	(Czech Republic) Lucie Hradecká (Czech Republic) Kateřina Siniaková	6–1, 4–6, [10–7]
Win	15–3	Jun 2017	French Open, France (2)	Grand Slam	Clay	(United States) Bethanie Mattek-Sands	(Australia) Ashleigh Barty (Australia) Casey Dellacqua	6–2, 6–1
Loss	15–4	Jun 2018	Mallorca Open, Spain	International	Grass	(Czech Republic) Barbora Štefková	(Slovenia) Andreja Klepač (Spain) María José Martínez Sánchez	1–6, 6–3, [3–10]
Loss	15–5	Apr 2019	Stuttgart Open, Germany	Premier	Clay (i)	(Russia) Anastasia Pavlyuchenkova	(Germany) Mona Barthel (Germany) Anna-Lena Friedsam	6–2, 3–6, [6–10]
Loss	15–6	Jul 2024	Prague Open, Czech Republic	WTA 250	Clay	(United States) Bethanie Mattek-Sands	(Czech Republic) Barbora Krejčíková (Czech Republic) Kateřina Siniaková	3–6, 3–6

== ITF Circuit finals ==
=== Singles: 10 (7 titles, 3 runner-ups) ===
Legend
100K tournaments
75K tournaments
50K tournaments
25K tournaments

Result	W–L	Date	Tournament	Tier	Surface	Opponent	Score
Loss	0–1	Dec 2003	ITF Valašské Meziříčí, Czech Republic	25K	Hard (i)	(Austria) Sybille Bammer	4–6, 1–6
Win	1–1	Feb 2004	ITF Bergamo, Italy	25K	Carpet (i)	(Croatia) Iva Majoli	3–6, 7–6, 6–1
Win	2–1	Jun 2004	ITF Båstad, Sweden	25K	Clay	(Slovakia) Lenka Tvarošková	6–2, 6–0
Loss	2–2	Oct 2004	ITF Ashburn, United States	50K	Hard	(United States) Laura Granville	4–6, 2–6
Loss	2–3	Dec 2004	ITF Valašské Meziříčí, Czech Republic	25K	Hard (i)	(Czech Republic) Libuše Průšová	6–7^{(7–9)}, 4–6
Win	3–3	Feb 2005	ITF Capriolo, Italy	25K	Hard	(Bosnia and Herzegovina) Mervana Jugić-Salkić	6–4, 6–1
Win	4–3	Mar 2005	ITF Redding, United States	25K	Hard	(Croatia) Ivana Lisjak	6–2, 6–3
Win	5–3	Jun 2005	ITF Prostějov, Czech Republic	75K	Clay	(Italy) Tathiana Garbin	6–4, 3–6, 6–3
Win	6–3	May 2012	Prague Open, Czech Republic	100K	Clay	(Czech Republic) Klára Koukalová	6–3, 7–5
Win	7–3	May 2013	Prague Open, Czech Republic (2)	100K	Clay	(Romania) Alexandra Cadanțu	3–6, 6–1, 6–1

=== Doubles: 2 (1 title, 1 runner-up) ===
Legend
100K tournaments

Result	W–L	Date	Tournament	Tier	Surface	Partner	Opponents	Score
Win	1–0	Oct 2008	ITF Poitiers, France	100K	Hard (i)	(Czech Republic) Petra Cetkovská	(Uzbekistan) Akgul Amanmuradova (Romania) Monica Niculescu	6–4, 6–4
Loss	1–1	May 2014	Prague Open, Czech Republic	100K	Clay	(Czech Republic) Andrea Hlaváčková	(Czech Republic) Lucie Hradecká (Romania) Michaëlla Krajicek	3–6, 2–6

== Career Grand Slam statistics ==
=== Best Grand Slam results details ===
Grand Slam winners are in boldface, and runner–ups are in italics.

Australian Open
2007 Australian Open (not seeded)
Round	Opponent	Rank	Score
1R	(Italy) Alberta Brianti	98	6–3, 6–1
2R	(Italy) Francesca Schiavone (14)	20	6–3, 6–3
3R	(Belarus) Anastasiya Yakimova	68	6–3, ret.
4R	(France) Amélie Mauresmo (2)	3	6–4, 6–3
QF	(Czech Republic) Nicole Vaidišová (10)	12	1–6, 4–6

Wimbledon
2014 Wimbledon (23rd seed)
Round	Opponent	Rank	Score
1R	(Germany) Julia Görges	99	7–6^{(7–3)}, 7–6^{(7–3)}
2R	(Slovenia) Polona Hercog	63	7–6^{(9–7)}, 7–5
3R	(Slovakia) Dominika Cibulková (10)	10	6–4, 6–2
4R	(Czech Republic) Tereza Smitková (Q)	175	6–0, 6–2
QF	(Russia) Ekaterina Makarova (22)	22	6–3, 6–1
SF	(Czech Republic) Petra Kvitová (6)	6	6–7^{(6–8)}, 1–6

French Open
2015 French Open (13th Seed)
Round	Opponent	Rank	Score
1R	(Russia) Anastasia Pavlyuchenkova	39	7–6^{(8–6)}, 7–6^{(11–9)}
2R	(Japan) Kurumi Nara	55	6–2, 6–0
3R	(Germany) Sabine Lisicki (20)	19	6–3, 7–6^{(7–2)}
4R	(Russia) Maria Sharapova (2)	2	7–6^{(7–3)}, 6–4
QF	(Spain) Garbiñe Muguruza (21)	20	7–6^{(7–3)}, 6–3
SF	(Serbia) Ana Ivanovic (7)	7	7–5, 7–5
F	(United States) **Serena Williams** (1)	1	3–6, 7–6^{(7–2)}, 2–6

US Open
2014 US Open (14th seed)
Round	Opponent	Rank	Score
1R	(Hungary) Tímea Babos	114	6–4, 7–5
2R	(China) Zheng Saisai (Q)	148	6–4, 4–6, 6–2
3R	(France) Alizé Cornet (22)	23	6–3, 6–7^{(3–7)}, 6–4
4R	(China) Peng Shuai	39	3–6, 4–6
2017 US Open (not seeded)
Round	Opponent	Rank	Score
1R	(Estonia) Anett Kontaveit (26)	29	6–7^{(5–7)}, 6–1, 6–4
2R	(Japan) Nao Hibino	80	6–3, 3–6, 6–2
3R	(Japan) Kurumi Nara	116	6–3, 6–2
4R	(United States) CoCo Vandeweghe (20)	22	4–6, 6–7^{(2–7)}

== Wins against top 10 players ==
- She has a 26–75 (26%) record against players who were, at the time the match was played, ranked in the top 10.

No.	Player	Rk	Event	Surface	Rd	Score	Rk	Years	Ref
1	(Switzerland) Patty Schnyder	7	Hard Court Championships, Australia	Hard	QF	6–4, 6–3	47	2006	
2	(France) Amélie Mauresmo	3	Australian Open, Australia	Hard	4R	6–4, 6–3	70	2007	
3	(Czech Republic) Nicole Vaidišová	9	Open Gaz de France, France	Carpet (i)	2R	6–4, 6–2	32	2007	
4	(Russia) Svetlana Kuznetsova	5	Open Gaz de France, France	Carpet (i)	QF	6–3, 6–4	32	2007	
5	(Belgium) Justine Henin	2	Open Gaz de France, France	Carpet (i)	SF	7–6^{(7–5)}, 6–4	32	2007	
6	(France) Amélie Mauresmo	4	French Open, France	Clay	3R	6–3, 7–6^{(7–3)}	29	2007	
7	(Denmark) Caroline Wozniacki	2	Stuttgart Open, Germany	Clay (i)	2R	6–4, 6–4	38	2010	
8	(Poland) Agnieszka Radwańska	9	Italian Open, Italy	Clay	3R	1–6, 6–3, 7–6^{(7–1)}	35	2010	
9	(Poland) Agnieszka Radwańska	10	Qatar Open, Qatar	Hard	2R	7–6^{(7–3)}, 6–3	35	2011	
10	(Serbia) Jelena Janković	7	Madrid Open, Spain	Clay	2R	6–4, 4–6, 7–5	32	2011	
11	(Italy) Francesca Schiavone	8	Canadian Open, Canada	Hard	2R	6–3, 6–3	32	2011	
12	(Poland) Agnieszka Radwańska	8	Kremlin Cup, Russia	Hard (i)	2R	6–4, 4–6, 6–4	27	2011	
13	(Denmark) Caroline Wozniacki	4	Qatar Open, Qatar	Hard	2R	4–6, 6–4, 7–6^{(7–3)}	28	2012	
14	(Russia) Vera Zvonareva	9	Charleston Open, United States	Clay	QF	6–3, 6–3	26	2012	
15	(Australia) Samantha Stosur	5	Canadian Open, Canada	Hard	3R	7–6^{(9–7)}, 7–6^{(7–5)}	23	2012	
16	(Australia) Samantha Stosur	9	Fed Cup	Hard	QF	7–6^{(8–6)}, 7–6^{(7–4)}	18	2013	
17	(Denmark) Caroline Wozniacki	10	Sydney International, Australia	Hard	2R	6–4, 7–6^{(9–7)}	27	2014	
18	(Slovakia) Dominika Cibulková	10	Wimbledon, United Kingdom	Grass	3R	6–4, 6–2	23	2014	
19	(Germany) Angelique Kerber	10	Fed Cup, Prague, Czech Republic	Hard (i)	F	6–4, 6–4	17	2014	
20	(Russia) Ekaterina Makarova	9	Qatar Open, Qatar	Hard	2R	6–2, 6–7^{(5–7)}, 6–3	15	2015	
21	(Germany) Andrea Petkovic	10	Qatar Open, Qatar	Hard	QF	6–2, 6–1	15	2015	
22	(Russia) Maria Sharapova	2	French Open, France	Clay	4R	7–6^{(7–3)}, 6–4	13	2015	
23	(Serbia) Ana Ivanovic	7	French Open, France	Clay	SF	7–5, 7–5	13	2015	
24	(Germany) Angelique Kerber	7	WTA Finals, Singapore	Hard (i)	RR	6–4, 6–3	9	2015	
25	(Slovakia) Dominika Cibulková	4	Miami Open, United States	Hard	4th	7–6^{(7–5)}, 6–1	36	2017	
26	(Slovakia) Dominika Cibulková	6	Birmingham Classic, United Kingdom	Grass	1R	5–7, 7–6^{(9–7)}, 7–5	41	2017	

- Key: (Rk) first use, opponent rank; (Rd) round; (Rk) 2nd use, player rank; (Ref) reference; (F) final; (SF) semifinal; (QF) quarterfinal; (#R) rounds 4, 3, 2, 1; (RR) round-robin stage; (Q#) qualifying rounds or stages (3), 2, 1.
