= 2024 Prague Open – Singles =

Singles
- 2024 Prague Open

Final
- Champion: (Poland) Magda Linette
- Runner-up: (Poland) Magdalena Fręch
- Score: 6–2, 6–1

Details
- Draw: 32
- Seeds: 8

Events
Singles	Doubles
- WTA Prague Open

Magda Linette won the singles title at the 2024 Prague Open, defeating Magdalena Fręch in the final, 6–2, 6–1 to win her third career WTA Tour title. It was the first all-Polish final on the WTA Tour in the Open Era.

Nao Hibino was the reigning champion, but did not participate this year. Laura Samson became the first player born in 2008 or later to win a WTA Tour main-draw match when she defeated Tara Würth in the first round.

== Seeds ==
1. (Czech Republic) Linda Nosková (semifinals)
2. (Czech Republic) Kateřina Siniaková (second round)
3. (Ukraine) Anhelina Kalinina (quarterfinals)
4. (Poland) Magda Linette (champion)
5. (Bulgaria) Viktoriya Tomova (quarterfinals)
6. (Poland) Magdalena Fręch (final)
7. (Argentina) Nadia Podoroska (first round)
8. (Slovakia) Anna Karolína Schmiedlová (first round)

== Draw ==
Key

- Q = Qualifier
- WC = Wild card
- LL = Lucky loser
- Alt = Alternate
- ITF = ITF entry
- PR = Protected ranking
- SR = Special ranking
- SE = Special exempt
- JE = Junior exempt
- JR = Junior Accelerator Programme entrant
- CO = College Accelerator Programme entrant
- NG = Next Gen Accelerator Program entrant
- w/o = Walkover
- r = Retired
- d = Defaulted

=== Finals ===
Semifinals
1	(Czech Republic) Linda Nosková	3	6	6^{2}
4	(Poland) Magda Linette	6	3	7^{7}
6	(Poland) Magdalena Fręch	3	6	4
WC	(Czech Republic) Laura Samson	6	0	2^{r}

Final
4	(Poland) Magda Linette	6	6
6	(Poland) Magdalena Fręch	2	1

=== Top half ===
First round
1	(Czech Republic) L Nosková	6	6
Q	(Ukraine) K Zavatska	3	2
Q	(Ukraine) A Sobolieva	4	3
(Germany) E Lys	6	6
LL	(Japan) E Shibahara	7^{7}	3	7
(Germany) T Korpatsch	6^{5}	6	5
(Germany) E Seidel	6	2	6
7	(Argentina) N Podoroska	4	6	1
4	(Poland) M Linette	7^{7}	6
Q	(Germany) M Barthel	6^{4}	4
(Netherlands) S Lamens	6	2	6^{5}
(Spain) R Masarova	2	6	7^{7}
(Croatia) J Fett	6	6
LL	(Belgium) A Van Uytvanck	2	2
WC	(Slovakia) R Jamrichová	6^{3}	3
5	(Bulgaria) V Tomova	7^{7}	6

Second round
1	(Czech Republic) L Nosková	6	2
(Germany) E Lys	2	1^{r}
LL	(Japan) E Shibahara	2	5
(Germany) E Seidel	6	7
4	(Poland) M Linette	6	6
(Spain) R Masarova	3	4
(Croatia) J Fett	3	4
5	(Bulgaria) V Tomova	6	6

Quarterfinals
1	(Czech Republic) L Nosková	6	6
(Germany) E Seidel	1	3
4	(Poland) M Linette	4	6	6
5	(Bulgaria) V Tomova	6	3	2

Semifinals
1	(Czech Republic) L Nosková	3	6	6^{2}
4	(Poland) M Linette	6	3	7^{7}

=== Bottom half ===
First round
6	(Poland) M Fręch	6	2	6
(Australia) A Sharma	4	6	2
(Turkey) Z Sönmez	4	0
(Czech Republic) D Šalková	6	6
(Spain) J Bouzas Maneiro	3	4
(France) E Jacquemot	6	6
(Czech Republic) S Bejlek	5	7^{9}	2
3	(Ukraine) A Kalinina	7	6^{7}	6
8	(Slovakia) AK Schmiedlová	4	4
LL	(Liechtenstein) K von Deichmann	6	6
WC	(Czech Republic) B Palicová	5	3
Q	O Selekhmeteva	7	6
Q	(Croatia) T Würth	0	2
WC	(Czech Republic) L Samson	6	6
Q	(United States) L Chirico	5	6	3
2	(Czech Republic) K Siniaková	7	4	6

Second round
6	(Poland) M Fręch	6	6^{4}	2
(Czech Republic) D Šalková	4	7^{7}	2^{r}
(France) E Jacquemot	5	6	2
3	(Ukraine) A Kalinina	7	3	6
LL	(Liechtenstein) K von Deichmann	1	2
Q	O Selekhmeteva	6	6
WC	(Czech Republic) L Samson	1	7	6
2	(Czech Republic) K Siniaková	6	5	3

Quarterfinals
6	(Poland) M Fręch	2	6	6
3	(Ukraine) A Kalinina	6	0	1
Q	O Selekhmeteva	6	3	5
WC	(Czech Republic) L Samson	2	6	7

Semifinals
6	(Poland) M Fręch	3	6	4
WC	(Czech Republic) L Samson	6	0	2^{r}

== Qualifying ==
=== Seeds ===
1. (France) Elsa Jacquemot (moved to main draw)
2. (Germany) Ella Seidel (moved to main draw)
3. (Ukraine) Katarina Zavatska (qualified)
4. (Germany) Mona Barthel (qualified)
5. (Australia) Priscilla Hon (first round)
6. (United States) Louisa Chirico (qualified)
7. (Ukraine) Anastasiia Sobolieva (qualified)
8. (Czech Republic) Tereza Martincová (first round)
9. (Liechtenstein) Kathinka von Deichmann (qualifying competition, lucky loser)
10. (Belgium) Alison Van Uytvanck (qualifying competition, lucky loser)
11. (Serbia) Dejana Radanović (first round)
12. Oksana Selekhmeteva (qualified)

=== Qualifiers ===
1. Oksana Selekhmeteva
2. (Ukraine) Anastasiia Sobolieva
3. (Ukraine) Katarina Zavatska
4. (Germany) Mona Barthel
5. (Croatia) Tara Würth
6. (United States) Louisa Chirico

=== Lucky losers ===
1. (Liechtenstein) Kathinka von Deichmann
2. (Belgium) Alison Van Uytvanck
3. (Japan) Ena Shibahara

=== Qualifying draw ===
==== First qualifier ====
First round
Alt	(Kazakhstan) Zhibek Kulambayeva	6	6
(Hungary) Réka Luca Jani	3	1
(Germany) Stephanie Wagner	2	1
12	Oksana Selekhmeteva	6	6

Qualifying competition
Alt	(Kazakhstan) Zhibek Kulambayeva	1	3
12	Oksana Selekhmeteva	6	6

==== Second qualifier ====
First round
Alt	(Czech Republic) Jesika Malečková	7	6
(Italy) Dalila Spiteri	5	2
WC	(Czech Republic) Lucie Šafářová	6	4	3
7	(Ukraine) Anastasiia Sobolieva	4	6	6

Qualifying competition
Alt	(Czech Republic) Jesika Malečková	2	6	3
7	(Ukraine) Anastasiia Sobolieva	6	2	6

==== Third qualifier ====
First round
3	(Ukraine) Katarina Zavatska	6	6
WC	(Czech Republic) Amélie Šmejkalová	1	4
Alt	(Switzerland) Conny Perrin	6	7
8	(Czech Republic) Tereza Martincová	0	5

Qualifying competition
3	(Ukraine) Katarina Zavatska	5	6	6
Alt	(Switzerland) Conny Perrin	7	4	3

==== Fourth qualifier ====
First round
4	(Germany) Mona Barthel	6	6
WC	(Czech Republic) Alena Kovačková	3	0
WC	(Czech Republic) Eliška Ticháčková	7^{9}	2	6^{3}
9	(Liechtenstein) Kathinka von Deichmann	6^{7}	6	7^{7}

Qualifying competition
4	(Germany) Mona Barthel	4	6	6
9	(Liechtenstein) Kathinka von Deichmann	6	1	2

==== Fifth qualifier ====
First round
5	(Australia) Priscilla Hon	3	5
(Croatia) Tara Würth	6	7
(Japan) Ena Shibahara	0	6	7^{9}
11	(Serbia) Dejana Radanović	6	4	6^{7}

Qualifying competition
(Croatia) Tara Würth	6	6^{6}	6
(Japan) Ena Shibahara	3	7^{8}	4

==== Sixth qualifier ====
First round
6	(United States) Louisa Chirico	6	6
(Italy) Camilla Rosatello	1	3
(Turkey) İpek Öz	4	2
10	(Belgium) Alison Van Uytvanck	6	6

Qualifying competition
6	(United States) Louisa Chirico	6	6
10	(Belgium) Alison Van Uytvanck	2	4
