= 2008 Forest Hills Tennis Classic =

- Date: August 19–23
- Edition: 5th
- Category: Tier IV Series
- Draw: 16S
- Prize money: $74,800
- Surface: Hard / outdoor
- Location: Forest Hills, New York
- Venue: West Side Tennis Club

Champions

Singles
- (Czech Republic) Lucie Šafářová
- Forest Hills Tennis Classic

The 2008 Forest Hills Tennis Classic was a women's tennis tournament played on outdoor hard courts. It was the fifth and final edition of the Forest Hills Tennis Classic, and was part of the Tier IV Series of the 2008 WTA Tour. The singles-only event took place at the West Side Tennis Club in Forest Hills, New York City, United States from August 19 through August 23, 2008. Unseeded Lucie Šafářová won the singles title, her second at the event after 2005, and earned $22,000 first-prize money.

== Finals ==
=== Singles ===
(Czech Republic) Lucie Šafářová defeated (China) Shuai Peng, 6–4, 6–2

- It was Šafářová's only singles title of the year, and her 4th of her career.
