= Anna Smashnova =

Israeli tennis player

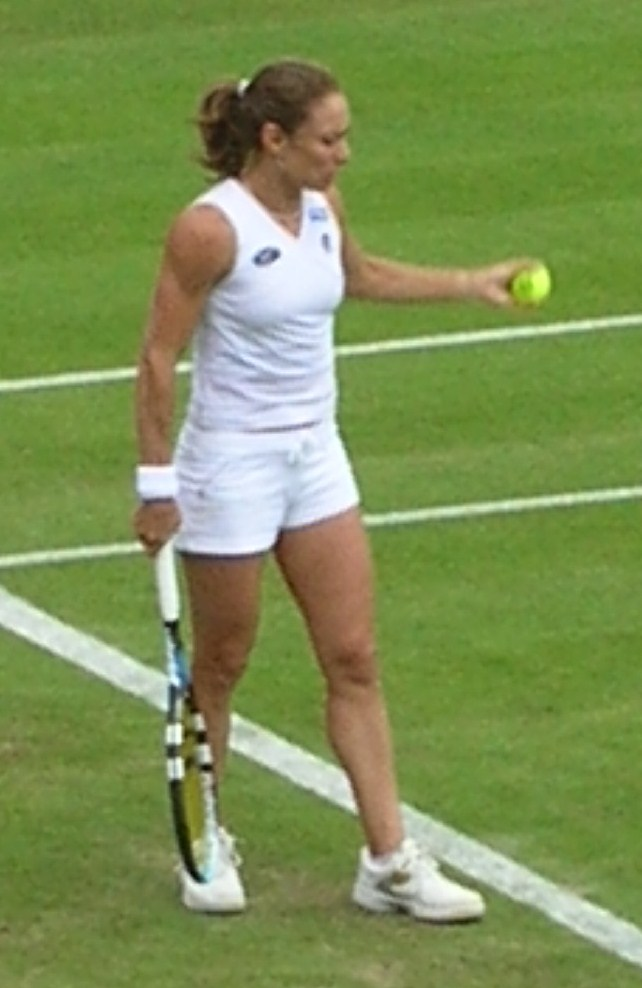
- Native name: אנה סמשנובה
- Country (sports): Israel
- Born: July 16, 1976 (age 49) Minsk, Byelorussian Soviet Socialist Republic, Soviet Union
- Height: 1.59 m (5 ft 3 in)
- Turned pro: January 1991
- Retired: July 2007
- Plays: Right-handed (one-handed backhand)
- Prize money: $2,274,431

Singles
- Career record: 401–304
- Career titles: 12 WTA, 7 ITF
- Highest ranking: No. 15 (February 3, 2003)

Grand Slam singles results
- Australian Open: 3R (1995, 2003, 2005)
- French Open: 4R (1995, 1998)
- Wimbledon: 3R (2000)
- US Open: 3R (1994)

Other tournaments
- Tour Finals: 1R (2002)
- Olympic Games: 1R (2004)

Doubles
- Career record: 31–45
- Career titles: 0
- Highest ranking: No. 275 (July 10, 2006)

Grand Slam doubles results
- Australian Open: 1R (2006, 2007)
- French Open: 1R (2005, 2006)
- Wimbledon: 1R (2005, 2006)
- US Open: 2R (2005)

Anna Aleksandrovna Smashnova (Hebrew: אנה סמשנובה, Russian: Анна Александровна Смашнова; born July 16, 1976) is a Soviet-born Israeli former tennis player. She retired from professional tour after Wimbledon 2007.

Smashnova reached her career-high singles ranking of world No. 15 in 2003. She reached 13 finals, and won 12 of them. In addition, she won a junior Grand Slam title, the 1991 French Open girls' singles championship.

== Early life ==
Smashnova, born in Minsk, is of Russian-Jewish descent. Her father Sasha is an engineer, and her mother is Zina. She has a brother, Yura, who is a software analyst. Smashnova graduated from American International High School outside Tel Aviv in 1995. She completed her service in the Israel Defense Forces in 1997.

Her family immigrated to Israel in September 1990, after Freddy Krivine, one of the founders of the Israel Tennis Centers, invited her to immigrate.

== Tennis career ==
Smashnova began playing tennis when she was six. She became the No. 1 junior in the Soviet Union at the age of ten. She was the number one junior in the Soviet Union from age ten until she moved to Israel at age 14. She won the girls' Soviet Union youth championship in 1989 at the age of 14.

After immigrating to Israel at age 15, Smashnova trained at the Israel Tennis Centers. In 1991, she won the girls' singles title at the French Open at age 14.

Smashnova was named Tennis Magazine/Rolex Watch Female Rookie of the Year in 1994. At the 1994 French Open she upset world No. 5, Jana Novotná, 6–4, 6–2. At the US Open in that year, she upset world No. 14, Lori McNeil, in straight sets. She reached the fourth round of the French Open in 1995 and 1998.

At the 1996 Australian Open, she defeated world No. 15, Natasha Zvereva, in three sets. She won her first top-level WTA Tour singles title in 1999 at the Tashkent Open. She won her second career title in 2000, winning the Sanex Trophy in Belgium. Smashnova defeated Anna Kournikova in straight sets in her semifinal match, and went on to win the final against top seed Dominique Van Roost.

She had a breakthrough in 2002, winning four titles and beating 11 players ranked in the top 20, including Jelena Dokić, Justine Henin, and Kim Clijsters. In January 2002, Smashnova defeated Tatiana Panova at the Auckland Open and top-seeded Tamarine Tanasugarn at the Canberra Classic. In March 2002, she upset world No. 13, Meghann Shaughnessy, at Indian Wells. In April, she defeated world No. 7, Justine Henin in Miami, and world No. 9, Jelena Dokić in Charleston. In May at the German Open, she upset world No. 3, Kim Clijsters, and world No. 14, Daniela Hantuchová, both in three sets.

On 16 June 2002, Smashnova defeated defending champion Iroda Tulyaganova at the Austrian Open. In August, she beat world No. 13, Elena Dementieva, in San Diego. In September 2002, she beat Anna Kournikova in the finals of the Shanghai Open. According to The New York Times, Smashnova "was precise and controlled throughout the match, hitting perfect winners in stride... Kournikova didn't score a point until the third game of the first set when Smashnova hit a shot wide. 'She was like a wall today, hitting everything back', Kournikova said." In October, she beat world No. 13, Chanda Rubin, in Zurich. She played in the 2002 WTA Tour Championships, and lost in the first round to world No. 1, Serena Williams.

On December 7, 2002, Anna married Claudio Pistolesi, her former coach (whom she later divorced), and played for a period of time as Anna Pistolesi and Anna Smashnova-Pistolesi.

She won the 2003 Sopot Open in Poland, beating Klára Koukalová in the finals in straight sets. Smashnova eliminated Karolina Šprem in the Nordic Light Open semifinal in Helsinki and defeated Jelena Kostanić in the final. At the Pilot Pen Tennis in New Haven, she posted wins against Anastasia Myskina and Vera Zvonareva. In October 2003, she defeated then world No. 13 Nadia Petrova in Moscow.

She was on the Israeli Olympic Team in 2004.

At the 2005 Australian Open, Smashnova defeated María Sánchez Lorenzo in the first round and Tamarine Tanasugarn in the second. She lost to Venus Williams (seeded eighth) in the third round. In July 2006, Smashnova won her 12th tour title at Budapest, maintaining a 100% winning record in WTA Tour finals – a record she held alone for players who had won double-digit titles. This streak ended in August 2006, when she lost in the final of the Forest Hills Tennis Classic women's event to Meghann Shaughnessy.

In March 2007, Smashnova announced on Israeli radio that she would retire from professional tennis after Wimbledon. As it turned out, she lost in the first round to German Martina Müller by the "double bagel" scoreline, 0–6, 0–6.

=== Fed Cup ===
She was on the Israeli Fed Cup team from 1992 to 2005. Smashnova holds the record for most ties played in Fed Cup competition – 61. Her win–loss record is 43–30 in Fed Cup competition for Israel from 1992 to 2006, including 7–3 on hardcourts in singles.

== WTA career finals ==
=== Singles: 13 (12 titles, 1 runner-up) ===
Legend
Tier I (0–0)
Tier II (0–0)
Tier III (3–0)
Tier IV, V (9–1)

Result	W/L	Date	Tournament	Surface	Opponent	Score
Win	1–0	Jun 1999	Tashkent Open, Uzbekistan	Hard	(Belgium) Laurence Courtois	6–3, 6–3
Win	2–0	Jul 2000	Knokke-Heist Open, Belgium	Clay	(Belgium) Dominique van Roost	6–2, 7–5
Win	3–0	Jan 2002	Auckland Open, New Zealand	Hard	(Russia) Tatiana Panova	6–2, 6–2
Win	4–0	Jan 2002	Canberra International, Australia	Hard	(Thailand) Tamarine Tanasugarn	7–5, 7–6^{(7–2)}
Win	5–0	Jun 2002	Austrian Open	Clay	(Uzbekistan) Iroda Tulyaganova	6–4, 6–1
Win	6–0	Sep 2002	Shanghai Open, China	Hard	(Russia) Anna Kournikova	6–2, 6–3
Win	7–0	Aug 2003	Sopot Open, Poland	Clay	(Czech Republic) Klára Zakopalová	6–2, 6–0
Win	8–0	Aug 2003	Nordic Light Open, Finland	Clay	(Croatia) Jelena Kostanić	4–6, 6–4, 6–0
Win	9–0	May 2004	Austrian Open	Clay	(Australia) Alicia Molik	6–2, 3–6, 6–2
Win	10–0	Jul 2005	Internazionali di Modena, Italy	Clay	(Italy) Tathiana Garbin	6–6 ret.
Win	11–0	Aug 2005	Budapest Grand Prix, Hungary	Clay	(Colombia) Catalina Castaño	6–2, 6–2
Win	12–0	Jul 2006	Budapest Grand Prix	Clay	(Spain) Lourdes Domínguez Lino	6–1, 6–3
Loss	12–1	Aug 2006	Forest Hills Classic, U.S.	Hard	(United States) Meghann Shaughnessy	6–1, 0–6, 4–6

== ITF Circuit finals ==
$100,000 tournaments
$75,000 tournaments
$50,000 tournaments
$25,000 tournaments
$10,000 tournaments

=== Singles: 17 (7–10) ===
Result	No.	Date	Tournament	Surface	Opponent	Score
Loss	1.	25 November 1991	ITF Ramat HaSharon, Israel	Hard	(South Africa) Tessa Price	4–6, 3–6
Win	2.	11 July 1993	ITF Erlangen, Germany	Clay	(Germany) Isabel Cueto	6–3, 6–1
Loss	3.	29 November 1993	Ramat HaSharon, Israel	Hard	(Finland) Petra Thorén	3–6, 3–6
Loss	4.	2 June 1997	ITF Tashkent, Uzbekistan	Hard	(Mexico) Angélica Gavaldón	3–6, 2–6
Loss	5.	14 July 1997	ITF Getxo, Spain	Clay	(France) Ségolène Berger	6–3, 3–6, 1–6
Win	6.	17 November 1997	ITF Jaffa, Israel	Hard	(Israel) Tzipora Obziler	6–3, 6–2
Loss	7.	6 October 1997	ITF Indian Wells, United States	Hard	(Japan) Miho Saeki	1–6, 4–6
Loss	8.	29 March 1998	ITF Woodlands, United States	Hard	(Germany) Elena Pampoulova	6–2, 1–6, 5–7
Win	9.	12 April 1998	ITF Athens, Greece	Clay	(Hungary) Rita Kuti-Kis	1–6, 6–2, 6–2
Loss	10.	4 May 1997	ITF Cardiff, Great Britain	Clay	(Czech Republic) Květa Peschke	5–7, 4–6
Win	11.	17 May 1998	ITF Porto, Portugal	Clay	(France) Alexia Dechaume-Balleret	6–2, 6–2
Win	12.	4 October 1998	ITF Santa Clara, United States	Hard	(United States) Amy Frazier	2–6, 6–4, 6–2
Loss	13.	3 October 1999	ITF Santa Clara, United States	Hard	(Zimbabwe) Cara Black	2–6, 1–6
Win	14.	17 October 1999	ITF Largo, United States	Hard	(United States) Marissa Irvin	7–6^{(2)}, 6–1
Loss	15.	9 September 2001	ITF Fano, Italy	Clay	(Czech Republic) Zuzana Ondrášková	6–3, 1–6, 5–7
Loss	16.	16 September 2001	ITF Bordeaux, France	Clay	(Bulgaria) Lubomira Bacheva	6–4, 1–6, 0–6
Win	17.	11 June 2006	ITF Prostějov, Czech Republic	Clay	(Italy) Romina Oprandi	w/o

=== Doubles: 2 (0–2) ===
Result	No.	Date	Tournament	Surface	Partner	Opponents	Score
Loss	1.	20 April 1997	ITF Bari, Italy	Clay	(Israel) Tzipora Obziler	(Federal Republic of Yugoslavia) Sandra Načuk (Federal Republic of Yugoslavia) Dragana Zarić	4–6, 2–6
Loss	2.	17 November 1997	ITF Jaffa, Israel	Hard	(Israel) Tzipora Obziler	(Israel) Nataly Cahana (Netherlands) Maaike Koutstaal	2–6, 1–6

== Junior Grand Slam finals ==
=== Girls' singles: 1 (1 title) ===
Result	Year	Tournament	Surface	Opponent	Score
Win	1991	French Open	Clay	(Argentina) Inés Gorrochategui	2-6, 7–5, 6–1

== Head-to-head records ==
Smashnova's win–loss records against certain players who have been ranked world No. 10 or higher is as follows:

Players who have been ranked world No. 1 are in boldface.

- (Switzerland) **Martina Hingis** 0–2
- (Belgium) Dominique Monami 2–0
- (United States) **Lindsay Davenport** 0–4
- (Italy) Flavia Pennetta 4–0
- (Czechoslovakia) / (Slovakia) Karina Habšudová 0–2
- (Serbia and Montenegro) / (Australia) Jelena Dokić 1–3
- (Japan) Ai Sugiyama 1–3
- (Russia) Anna Kournikova 2–3
- (United States) **Jennifer Capriati** 0–2
- (Spain) **Arantxa Sánchez Vicario** 0–1
- (Russia) Elena Dementieva 2–1
- (Slovakia) Daniela Hantuchová 3–2
- (Russia) Nadia Petrova 1–1
- (Russia) **Dinara Safina** 1–0
- (Russia) Anastasia Myskina 1–1
- (France) **Amélie Mauresmo** 1–6
- (Belgium) **Kim Clijsters** 1–1
- (Socialist Federal Republic of Yugoslavia) / (Federal Republic of Yugoslavia) / (United States) **Monica Seles** 0–2
- (Czech Republic) Nicole Vaidišová 0–1
- (Serbia) **Jelena Janković** 1–1
- (United States) **Venus Williams** 0–3
- (United States) **Serena Williams** 0–2
- (Belgium) **Justine Henin** 1–2
- (Russia) **Maria Sharapova** 0–2

== See also ==
- List of select Jewish tennis players
