= 2024 Prague Open – Doubles =

Doubles
- 2024 Prague Open

Final
- Champions: (Czech Republic) Barbora Krejčiková (Czech Republic) Kateřina Siniaková
- Runners-up: (United States) Bethanie Mattek-Sands (Czech Republic) Lucie Šafářová
- Score: 6–3, 6–3

Details
- Draw: 16
- Seeds: 4

Events
Singles	Doubles
← 2023 ·	WTA Prague Open	· 2025 →

Barbora Krejčiková and Kateřina Siniaková defeated Bethanie Mattek-Sands and Lucie Šafářová in the final, 6–3, 6–3 to win the doubles tennis title at the 2024 Prague Open.

Nao Hibino and Oksana Kalashnikova were the reigning champions, but did not participate this year.

== Seeds ==
1. (Czech Republic) Barbora Krejčíková / (Czech Republic) Kateřina Siniaková (champions)
2. (Japan) Shuko Aoyama / (Japan) Ena Shibahara (first round)
3. (Chinese Taipei) Hsieh Su-wei / (Chinese Taipei) Tsao Chia-yi (semifinals, withdrew)
4. (Italy) Camilla Rosatello / (Belgium) Kimberley Zimmermann (semifinals)

== Draw ==
=== Key ===
- Q = Qualifier
- WC = Wild card
- LL = Lucky loser
- Alt = Alternate
- ITF = ITF entry
- PR = Protected ranking
- SR = Special ranking
- SE = Special exempt
- JE = Junior exempt
- JR = Junior Accelerator Programme entrant
- CO = College Accelerator Programme entrant
- NG = Next Gen Accelerator Program entrant
- w/o = Walkover
- r = Retired
- d = Defaulted

=== Draw ===
First round
1	(Czech Republic) B Krejčíková (Czech Republic) K Siniaková	6	6
WC	(Slovakia) R Jamrichová (Czech Republic) L Samson	3	4
A Fomina-Klotz; E Yashina	5	2
(Australia) P Hon (Turkey) Z Sönmez	7	6
3	(Chinese Taipei) S-w Hsieh (Chinese Taipei) C-y Tsao	5	6	[10]
(Czech Republic) M Kolodziejová (Czech Republic) J Malečková	7	1	[4]
(France) E Cascino (China) Q Tang	7	6
(France) E Lechemia (Australia) A Sharma	5	4
(Liechtenstein) K von Deichmann (Ukraine) K Zavatska	3	2
(United States) Q Gleason (Switzerland) C Perrin	6	6
(Belgium) M Kempen (Belgium) L Salden	4	3
4	(Italy) C Rosatello (Belgium) K Zimmermann	6	6
(China) S Feng (Kazakhstan) Z Kulambayeva	5	2
(Czech Republic) B Palicová (Czech Republic) D Šalková	7	6
WC	(United States) B Mattek-Sands (Czech Republic) L Šafářová	6	7
2	(Japan) S Aoyama (Japan) E Shibahara	2	5

Quarterfinals
1	(Czech Republic) B Krejčíková (Czech Republic) K Siniaková	6	6
(Australia) P Hon (Turkey) Z Sönmez	4	1
3	(Chinese Taipei) S-w Hsieh (Chinese Taipei) C-y Tsao	7	6
(France) E Cascino (China) Q Tang	5	0
(United States) Q Gleason (Switzerland) C Perrin	5	6	[5]
4	(Italy) C Rosatello (Belgium) K Zimmermann	7	4	[10]
(Czech Republic) B Palicová (Czech Republic) D Šalková
WC	(United States) B Mattek-Sands (Czech Republic) L Šafářová	w/o

Semifinals
1	(Czech Republic) B Krejčíková (Czech Republic) K Siniaková	w/o
3	(Chinese Taipei) S-w Hsieh (Chinese Taipei) C-y Tsao
4	(Italy) C Rosatello (Belgium) K Zimmermann	2	2
WC	(United States) B Mattek-Sands (Czech Republic) L Šafářová	6	6

Final
1	(Czech Republic) B Krejčíková (Czech Republic) K Siniaková	6	6
WC	(United States) B Mattek-Sands (Czech Republic) L Šafářová	3	3
