= 2008 Forest Hills Tennis Classic – Singles =

Singles
- 2008 Forest Hills Tennis Classic

Final
- Champion: (Czech Republic) Lucie Šafářová
- Runner-up: (China) Peng Shuai
- Score: 6–4, 6–2

Details
- Draw: 16 (1WC)
- Seeds: 4

Events
Singles
- Forest Hills Tennis Classic

Gisela Dulko was the defending champion, but she chose to compete at New Haven during the same week.

Lucie Šafářová won the title by defeating Peng Shuai 6–4, 6–2 in the final.

== Seeds ==
1. (France) Pauline Parmentier (first round)
2. (New Zealand) Marina Erakovic (first round)
3. (Czech Republic) Iveta Benešová (semifinals)
4. (Spain) Carla Suárez Navarro (semifinals)

== Draw ==
Key

- Q = Qualifier
- WC = Wild card
- LL = Lucky loser
- Alt = Alternate
- ITF = ITF entry
- PR = Protected ranking
- SR = Special ranking
- SE = Special exempt
- JE = Junior exempt
- JR = Junior Accelerator Programme entrant
- CO = College Accelerator Programme entrant
- NG = Next Gen Accelerator Program entrant
- w/o = Walkover
- r = Retired
- d = Defaulted

=== Draw ===
First round
1	(France) P Parmentier	3	2
(China) S Peng	6	6
(Russia) V Dushevina	6	6
(Sweden) S Arvidsson	2	2
4	(Spain) C Suárez Navarro	6	7^{7}
(Switzerland) T Bacsinsky	4	6^{5}
(Czech Republic) P Cetkovská	2	3
(Germany) M Müller	6	6
(Russia) E Makarova	7	6
WC	(United States) G Brodsky	5	2
(Russia) E Vesnina	1	7^{7}	5
3	(Czech Republic) I Benešová	6	6^{5}	7
(Uzbekistan) A Amanmuradova	7^{13}	3	3
(Czech Republic) L Šafářová	6^{11}	6	6
(United States) J Jackson	7^{7}	7
2	(New Zealand) M Erakovic	6^{4}	5

Quarterfinals
(China) S Peng	6	7
(Russia) V Dushevina	4	5
4	(Spain) C Suárez Navarro	6	6
(Germany) M Müller	2	0
(Russia) E Makarova	6	2	4
3	(Czech Republic) I Benešová	2	6	6
(Czech Republic) L Šafářová	3	6	6
(United States) J Jackson	6	3	0

Semifinals
(China) S Peng	6	6
4	(Spain) C Suárez Navarro	1	2
3	(Czech Republic) I Benešová	2	4
(Czech Republic) L Šafářová	6	6

Final
(China) S Peng	4	2
(Czech Republic) L Šafářová	6	6
