= 2007 Forest Hills Tennis Classic – Singles =

Singles
- 2007 Forest Hills Tennis Classic

Final
- Champion: (Argentina) Gisela Dulko
- Runner-up: (France) Virginie Razzano
- Score: 6–2, 6–2

Details
- Draw: 16 (1WC)
- Seeds: 4

Events
Singles
- Forest Hills Tennis Classic

Meghann Shaughnessy was the defending champion, but she chose to compete at New Haven during the same week.

Gisela Dulko won the title by defeating Virginie Razzano 6–2, 6–2 in the final.

== Seeds ==
1. (France) Virginie Razzano (final)
2. (United States) Meilen Tu (quarterfinals)
3. (Argentina) Gisela Dulko (champion)
4. (Japan) Aiko Nakamura (quarterfinals)

== Draw ==
Key

- Q = Qualifier
- WC = Wild card
- LL = Lucky loser
- Alt = Alternate
- ITF = ITF entry
- PR = Protected ranking
- SR = Special ranking
- SE = Special exempt
- JE = Junior exempt
- JR = Junior Accelerator Programme entrant
- CO = College Accelerator Programme entrant
- NG = Next Gen Accelerator Program entrant
- w/o = Walkover
- r = Retired
- d = Defaulted

=== Draw ===
First round
1	(France) V Razzano	6	7
(United States) J Craybas	4	5
(Australia) A Molik	4	2
(Japan) A Morigami	6	6
4	(Japan) A Nakamura	5	6	6
(Russia) A Kudryavtseva	7	3	4
(Russia) E Vesnina	6	6
(France) S Brémond	4	4
WC	(United States) A Cohen	4	6	0
(Russia) E Likhovtseva	6	4	0^{r}
(Chinese Taipei) Y-j Chan	6	0	2
3	(Argentina) G Dulko	1	6	6
(France) N Dechy	6	7
(Russia) V Dushevina	2	5
(Italy) R Vinci	6	2	0
2	(United States) M Tu	4	6	6

Quarterfinals
1	(France) V Razzano	6	7^{7}
(Japan) A Morigami	2	6^{3}
4	(Japan) A Nakamura	3	2
(Russia) E Vesnina	6	6
WC	(United States) A Cohen	1	1
3	(Argentina) G Dulko	6	6
(France) N Dechy	6	6^{6}	6
2	(United States) M Tu	4	7^{8}	4

Semifinals
1	(France) V Razzano	6	6
(Russia) E Vesnina	2	0
3	(Argentina) G Dulko	7^{7}	6
(France) N Dechy	6^{4}	4

Final
1	(France) V Razzano	2	2
3	(Argentina) G Dulko	6	6
