= 2024 Prague Open =

Women's tennis tournament

- Date: 21 – 26 July
- Edition: 15th
- Category: WTA 250
- Surface: Clay / outdoor
- Location: Prague, Czech Republic
- Venue: TK Sparta Prague

Champions

Singles
- (Poland) Magda Linette

Doubles
- (Czech Republic) Barbora Krejčíková / (Czech Republic) Kateřina Siniaková
- WTA Prague Open

The 2024 Prague Open (branded as the Livesport Prague Open for sponsorship reasons) was a professional women's tennis tournament played on outdoor clay courts at the TK Sparta Prague. It was the 15th edition of the tournament, a WTA 250 tournament on the 2024 WTA Tour. It took place in Prague, Czech Republic from 21 to 26 July 2024. Magda Linette and Magdalena Fręch played the first all-Polish final on the WTA Tour in the Open Era, while wildcard entrant Laura Samson became the first player born in 2008 or later to win a WTA Tour main draw match.

== Champions ==
=== Singles ===
- (Poland) Magda Linette def. (Poland) Magdalena Fręch, 6–2, 6–1

=== Doubles ===
- (Czech Republic) Barbora Krejčiková / (Czech Republic) Kateřina Siniaková def. (United States) Bethanie Mattek-Sands / (Czech Republic) Lucie Šafářová 6–3, 6–3

== Singles main draw entrants ==
=== Seeds ===
Country	Player	Rank^{†}	Seed
CZE	Linda Nosková	26	1
CZE	Kateřina Siniaková	38	2
UKR	Anhelina Kalinina	47	3
POL	Magda Linette	48	4
BUL	Viktoriya Tomova	49	5
POL	Magdalena Fręch	56	6
ARG	Nadia Podoroska	71	7
SVK	Anna Karolína Schmiedlová	79	8

^{†} Rankings are as of 15 July 2024.

=== Other entrants ===
The following players received wildcards into the singles main draw:

- (Slovakia) Renáta Jamrichová
- (Czech Republic) Barbora Palicová
- (Czech Republic) Laura Samson

The following players received entry from the qualifying draw:

- (Germany) Mona Barthel
- (United States) Louisa Chirico
- Oksana Selekhmeteva
- (Ukraine) Anastasiia Sobolieva
- (Croatia) Tara Würth
- (Ukraine) Katarina Zavatska

The following players received entry as lucky losers:

- (Japan) Ena Shibahara
- (Belgium) Alison Van Uytvanck
- (Liechtenstein) Kathinka von Deichmann

=== Withdrawals ===
- (Czech Republic) Barbora Krejčiková → replaced by (Netherlands) Suzan Lamens
- (Colombia) Camila Osorio → replaced by (Japan) Ena Shibahara
- (Australia) Daria Saville → replaced by (Czech Republic) Sára Bejlek
- (China) Wang Xinyu → replaced by (Germany) Eva Lys
- (Mexico) Renata Zarazúa → replaced by (Croatia) Jana Fett
- (China) Zheng Saisai → replaced by (Turkey) Zeynep Sönmez

== Doubles main draw entrants ==
=== Seeds ===
Country	Player	Country	Player	Rank^{†}	Seed
CZE	Barbora Krejčíková	CZE	Kateřina Siniaková	24	1
JPN	Shuko Aoyama	JPN	Ena Shibahara	50	2
TPE	Hsieh Su-wei	TPE	Tsao Chia-yi	141	3
ITA	Camilla Rosatello	BEL	Kimberley Zimmermann	163	4

^{†} Rankings are as of 15 July 2024.

=== Other entrants ===
The following pairs received wildcard entry into the doubles main draw:

- (Slovakia) Renáta Jamrichová / (Czech Republic) Laura Samson
- (United States) Bethanie Mattek-Sands / (Czech Republic) Lucie Šafářová
