= Forest Hills Tennis Classic =

Defunct tennis tournament
- Founded: 2004
- Abolished: 2008
- Editions: 5
- Location: Forest Hills, Queens, New York; United States
- Venue: West Side Tennis Club
- Category: Tier V (2004); Tier IV (2005–2008)
- Surface: Hard / outdoors
- Draw: 16M/--Q/--D
- Website: foresthillstennis.com

The Forest Hills Tennis Classic was a professional women's tennis tournament played on outdoor hard courts. It was part of the Tier V Series of the WTA Tour in 2004, then of the Tier IV Series from 2005 to 2008. It was held annually at the West Side Tennis Club in Forest Hills, New York City, United States, from 2004 to 2008.

== Past finals ==
=== Singles ===
Year	Champions	Runners-up	Score
2004	(Russia) Elena Likhovtseva	(Czech Republic) Iveta Benešová	6–2, 6–2
2005	(Czech Republic) Lucie Šafářová	(India) Sania Mirza	3–6, 7–5, 6–4
2006	(United States) Meghann Shaughnessy	(Israel) Anna Smashnova	1–6, 6–0, 6–4
2007	(Argentina) Gisela Dulko	(France) Virginie Razzano	6–2, 6–2
2008	(Czech Republic) Lucie Šafářová (2)	(China) Peng Shuai	6–4, 6–2

== See also ==
- Tournament of Champions – men's tournament held at the West Side Tennis Club (1957–1959)
