= Lucie Šafářová =

Czech tennis player (born 1987)

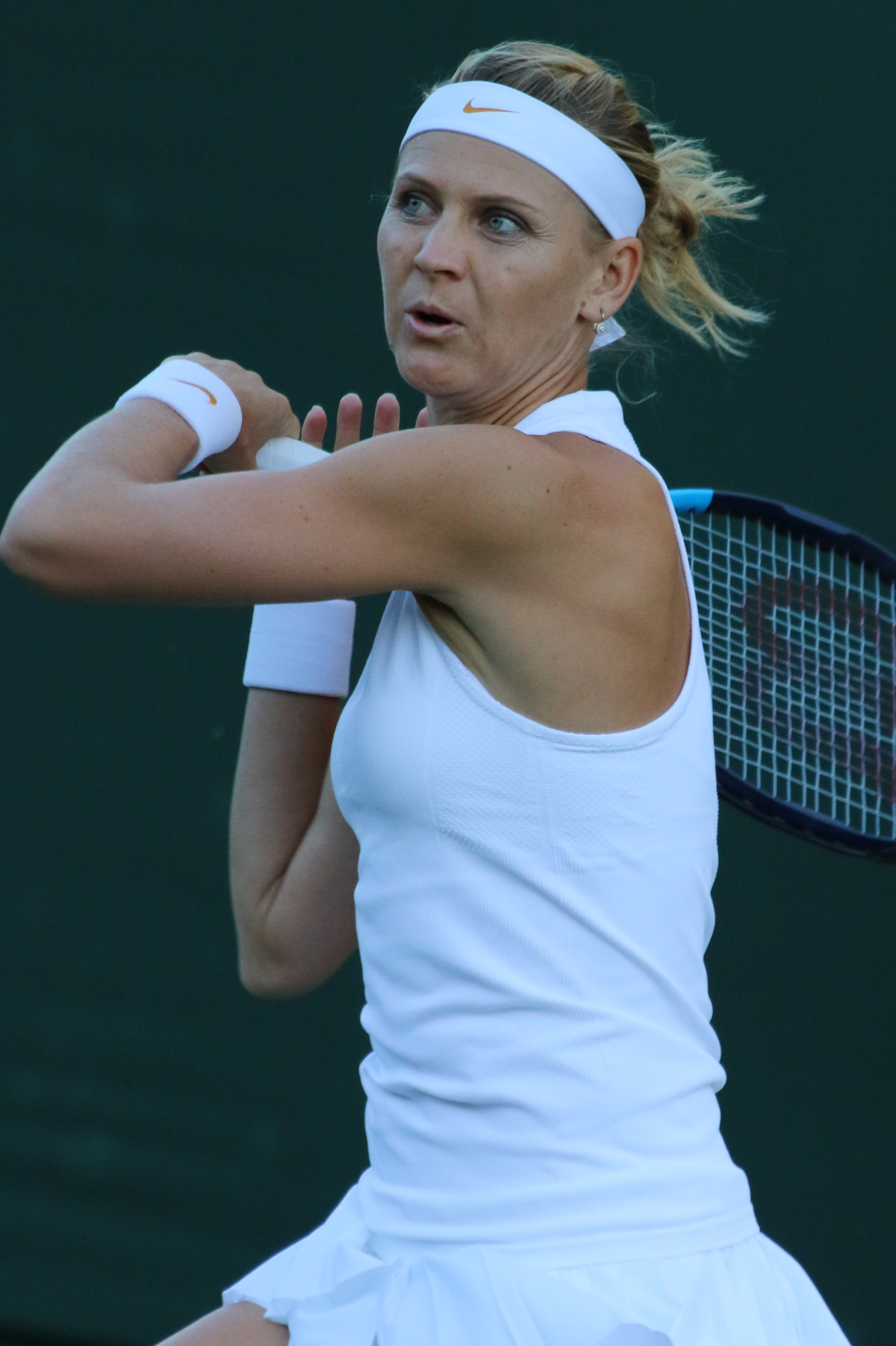
- Šafářová at the 2018 Wimbledon Championships
- Country (sports): Czech Republic
- Born: 4 February 1987 (age 39) Brno, Czechoslovakia (now Czech Republic)
- Height: 1.77 m (5 ft 10 in)
- Turned pro: 2001
- Retired: 2019 (first retirement)
- Plays: Left-handed (two-handed backhand)
- Coach: Rob Steckley
- Prize money: US$ 12,656,891
- Official website: lucie-safarova.com

Singles
- Career record: 449–319
- Career titles: 7
- Highest ranking: No. 5 (14 September 2015)

Grand Slam singles results
- Australian Open: QF (2007)
- French Open: F (2015)
- Wimbledon: SF (2014)
- US Open: 4R (2014, 2017)

Other tournaments
- Tour Finals: RR (2015)
- Olympic Games: 3R (2008)

Doubles
- Career record: 205–155
- Career titles: 15
- Highest ranking: No. 1 (21 August 2017)

Grand Slam doubles results
- Australian Open: W (2015, 2017)
- French Open: W (2015, 2017)
- Wimbledon: QF (2014, 2015, 2018)
- US Open: W (2016)

Other doubles tournaments
- Tour Finals: F (2016)
- Olympic Games: Bronze (2016)

Team competitions
- Fed Cup: W (2011, 2012, 2014, 2015, 2018), record 14–15
Medal record
Representing Czech Republic
Olympic Games
Bronze medal – third place	2016 Rio de Janeiro	Doubles
- Last updated on: 22 June 2026.

Lucie Šafářová (Czech pronunciation: [ˈlutsɪjɛ ˈʃafaːr̝ovaː]; born 4 February 1987) is a Czech inactive tennis player who was ranked world No. 1 in doubles, and No. 5 in singles.

She is a five-time major champion in doubles, having won the 2015 Australian Open, 2015 French Open, 2016 US Open, 2017 Australian Open and 2017 French Open, all alongside Bethanie Mattek-Sands. Šafářová won 15 doubles titles on the WTA Tour, including five at Premier Mandatory/Premier 5-level, and also finished runner-up at the 2016 WTA Finals with Mattek-Sands. She became world No. 1 for the first time in August 2017, holding the top ranking for the next six weeks.

In singles, Šafářová won seven WTA Tour titles, most notably the 2015 Qatar Open, and reached her highest ranking of world No. 5 in September that year. She reached her first major singles final at the 2015 French Open, being defeated by world No. 1 Serena Williams. Šafářová also reached the semifinals at the 2014 Wimbledon Championships, and the quarterfinals at the 2007 Australian Open, qualifying for the WTA Finals for the first time in 2015.

She represented the Czech Republic in the Fed Cup from 2004 to 2019, and was a key part of the team which won the competition five times between 2011 and 2018. Šafářová also competed at the Summer Olympics on three occasions, winning a bronze medal in doubles at the 2016 Rio Games partnering Barbora Strýcová.

== Playing style ==
Šafářová plays left-handed with a two-handed backhand and possesses a high topspin forehand. Her timing off the ground allows her to project groundstrokes with power, and she is quick to spot opportunities to take the initiative. Šafářová is notorious for having a volatile return that is capable of hitting clean winners, as well as unforced errors. Her preferred surface is clay. She was coached by Rob Steckley until September 2016 when she split with him, ending a coaching relationship of more than three and a half years, and hired František Čermák. In December 2017, Šafářová announced that she is reuniting with Rob Steckley for the 2018 season.

== Career ==
=== 2005–2006 ===
Šafářová won her first WTA Tour event in May 2005 at the Estoril Open in Portugal, where she defeated fourth-seeded Li Na in a three-sets final. In June she lost the final of the Rosmalen grass court tournament to fellow Czech Klára Koukalová in three sets. She won her second tournament at the Forest Hills Tennis Classic in August, which was played at the historic West Side Tennis Club, after a victory in the final against Sania Mirza.

Šafářová started off 2006 by upsetting world No. 6, Patty Schnyder, in the semifinals of the Gold Coast tournament and then winning the title with a straight-set victory. Also in 2006, she made her first Tier-II semifinal at Amelia Island, where she upset Nicole Vaidišová in the round of 16. She later lost to eventual champion Nadia Petrova. She then made another semifinal at the Tier-IV tournament at Palermo, where she was defeated by Anabel Medina Garrigues.

=== 2007: First major quarterfinal ===
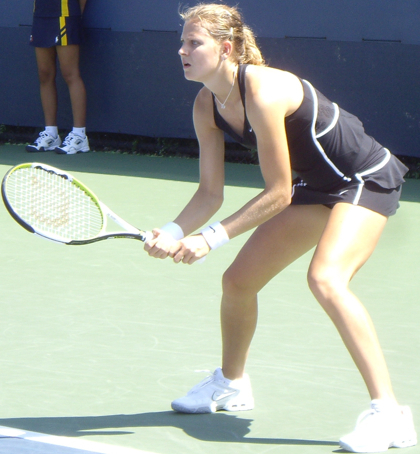
Šafářová at the 2007 US Open

At the start of 2007, Šafářová elected to represent the Czech Republic in the Hopman Cup instead of defending her Gold Coast title. Due to not defending the points at that tournament, she came into the first Grand Slam tournament of the year ranked No. 70 and unseeded. Yet she made headlines at the Australian Open, when she stunned the defending champion and No. 2 seed Amélie Mauresmo in the fourth round. She then lost to fellow Czech Nicole Vaidišová in the quarterfinals. After the Australian Open, her ranking rose from No. 70 to 31.

Šafářová continued her good start to 2007 at the Paris indoor event. She reached the final by defeating Tsvetana Pironkova in three sets and Nicole Vaidišová, Svetlana Kuznetsova, and Justine Henin, all in straight sets. However, she lost the final against Nadia Petrova in three sets. She pulled out of her next event in Antwerp due to a shoulder injury.

Šafářová lost in round three of both Indian Wells and Miami to Shahar Pe'er and Serena Williams, respectively. She defeated Daniela Hantuchová in the Czech Republic vs. Slovak Republic Fed Cup encounter. She then lost in the semifinals of the Tier-IV Estoril tournament to Victoria Azarenka.

At Roland Garros, Šafářová defeated Mauresmo in the third round, in straight sets. It was the second time in a row that she had beaten Mauresmo in a Grand Slam championship, after winning their only previous encounter in January at the Australian Open. In the next round, she lost in three sets to Anna Chakvetadze. As the 25th seed in Wimbledon, she defeated Zuzana Ondrášková followed by a win over Eleni Daniilidou, in three sets. However, in the third round, she lost to world No. 3, Jelena Janković, in three sets, after coming within two points of another major upset. The match was described as the best match of the 2007 WTA Tour up to that point and the best women's Wimbledon match in many years. Šafářová entered the US Open as the 20th seed. She defeated Jessica Moore in the first round and Andrea Petkovic in the second round. She fell to Marion Bartoli in the third round. In 2007, she advanced to the third round or better in all four majors including the quarterfinals of the Australian Open, which was the best Grand Slam tournament result at that point of her career.

=== 2008 ===
At the beginning of 2008, Šafářová again decided to enter the Hopman Cup in Perth. She was ranked No. 23 and took on world No. 56 Alicia Molik of Australia. She lost the match followed by a loss with her partner on and off the court, Tomáš Berdych, in mixed doubles. Against the team of the United States, she lost to Serena Williams in three sets. Šafářová and Berdych lost the first set of the mixed doubles and then retired from the match due to Berdych's health concerns. The Czechs closed the cup by defeating India 2-1. Šafářová won her singles match against Sania Mirza in three sets. After Berdych also won his singles match and clinched the victory, Šafářová and Berdych lost the mixed-doubles match.

Šafářová's second competition of the year was the Sydney International. In the first round, she faced Alicia Molik and won in two tiebreaks. Both players had set points and match points throughout the tiebreaker, but Šafářová was able to come out on top. She subsequently pulled out of the second round against world No. 1, Justine Henin.

Šafářová entered the Australian Open as the 22nd seed. In the first round, she faced Catalina Castaño of Colombia and lost in 71 minutes. Later, it was revealed that a gluteal strain was plaguing her during the match. She sustained the injury during her first-round encounter against Molik at the Medibank International. Competing in Indian Wells, Šafářová, seeded 26th, lost in three sets in the second round to Ashley Harkleroad. Following that, she lost at Miami to fourth seed Jelena Janković.

At the Summer Olympics, Šafářová competed in both singles and women's doubles. She reached the third round of the singles by beating Maret Ani and Mariya Koryttseva before losing to Sybille Bammer. In the women's doubles, she and partner Petra Kvitová were knocked out in the first round. She followed the Olympics by winning the Forest Hills Tennis Classic for the second time. She became the first and only player to win the Classic more than once, as 2008 was the last edition of the tournament.

=== 2009 ===
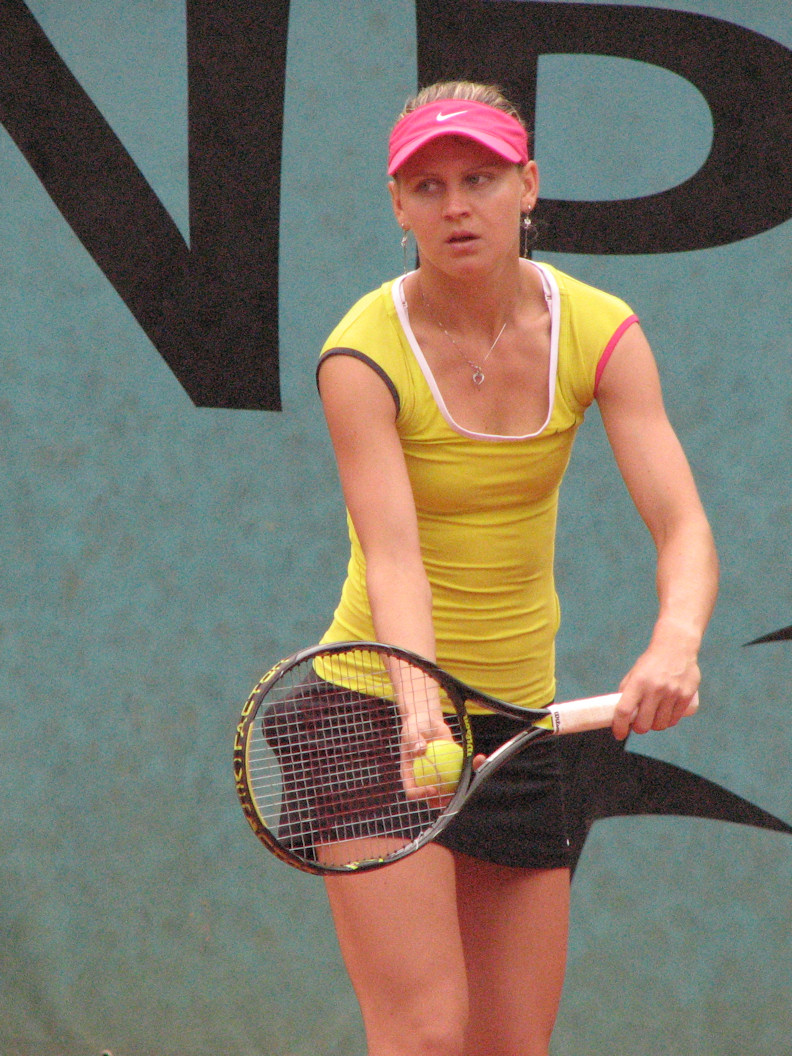
Šafářová at the 2009 French Open

Šafářová began the year with a quarterfinal showing at the hardcourt event in Brisbane. She defeated the Australians Isabella Holland and Samantha Stosur before being defeated by second-seeded Victoria Azarenka of Belarus. After failing to qualify for the premier event in Sydney, she reached the third round of the Australian Open by defeating Sybille Bammer and Marina Erakovic before losing to Marion Bartoli in three sets. She did not advance past the second round in any of the other Grand Slam tournaments in 2009.

=== 2010 ===
Šafářová started into the season by reaching the quarterfinals of the Brisbane International, where she lost to eventual champion Kim Clijsters. She then suffered first round losses at the Hobart International, where she retired against Kateryna Bondarenko in the third set, and the Australian Open, where she lost to sixth seed Venus Williams. She made her first final of the year indoors in Paris by defeating Flavia Pennetta in the semifinals. In the final, she won the first set, but fell in three sets to top seed Elena Dementieva. In her next two tournaments, she then suffered two more first-round losses. First, at the Monterrey Open, she lost to Julie Coin, then at Indian Wells against Julia Görges. At the Miami Open, she was unseeded. She won her first-round match against Kaia Kanepi, and then defeated María José Martínez Sánchez in the second round in three sets, after being down match points at 5–2 in the second set. She then fell to fourth seed Victoria Azarenka.

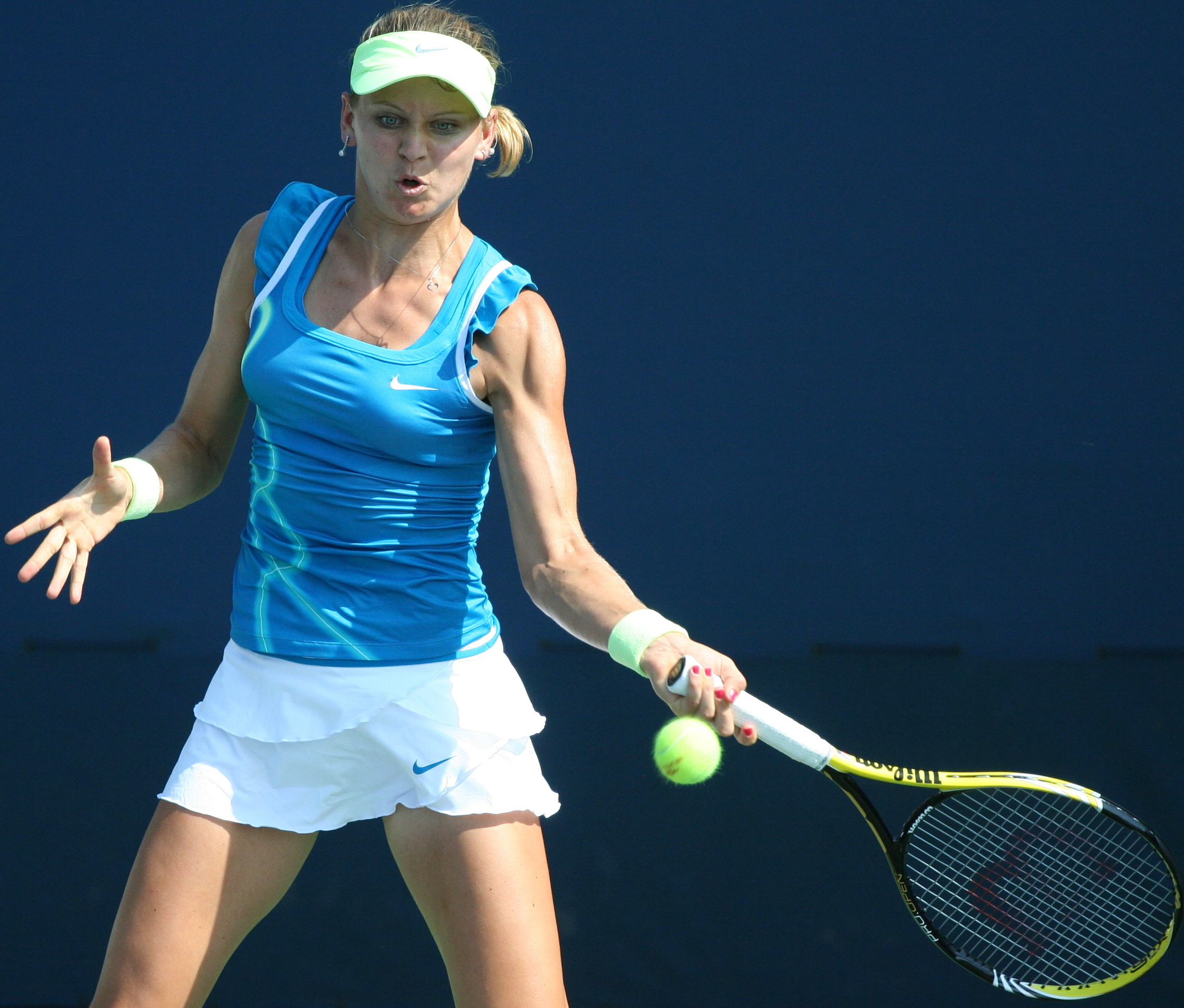
Šafářová at the 2010 US Open

At the Porsche Tennis Grand Prix, Šafářová upset world No. 2 and top-seed, Caroline Wozniacki, in the second round. She then fell in three sets to qualifier Anna Lapushchenkova in the quarterfinals. At the Italian Open, she upset world No. 9, Agnieszka Radwańska, in the third round, but lost to eventual champion Martínez Sánchez, in straight sets in the quarterfinals. At the Madrid Open, she upset world No. 12 Maria Sharapova in the first round. She then defeated Olga Govortsova and Alexandra Dulgheru to advance to the quarterfinals, where she beat world No. 18 Nadia Petrova. She retired due to a thigh injury while trailing Aravane Rezaï by a set in the semifinals. At the French Open, she was seeded 24th. She defeated Jelena Dokić in the first round, but was defeated by Polona Hercog in the second round. The French Open would be her best singles result at a Grand Slam in 2010 as she lost in the first round at both Wimbledon and the US Open.

=== 2011 ===
Šafářová began the year at the Brisbane International where she made it to the quarterfinals after tough matches against Akgul Amanmuradova and Shahar Pe'er where she lost to Anastasia Pavlyuchenkova, in three sets. As the 31st seed at the Australian Open, she struggled through her first two rounds, but defeated Zhang Shuai and Klára Zakopalová, respectively. In the third round, she lost in two sets to world No. 2, Vera Zvonareva, despite having had a set point in the second set.

Following the Australian Open, Šafářová defeated Daniela Hantuchová in the 2011 Fed Cup, but retired in her second rubber against Jana Čepelová. Her next tournament was the Paris Indoor, where she fell to a resurgent Jelena Dokić in the first round. A week later at the Dubai Championships, she again exited in the first round by losing to Klára Zakopalová. Her performance at the Qatar Open was more positive, as she defeated world No. 10, Agnieszka Radwańska in two sets, before losing in three sets in the second round to Flavia Pennetta. She had her best result in 2011 at the Malaysian Open, where she reached the final against an in-form Jelena Dokić. She held two championship points in the second-set tiebreaker, but was unable to convert either chance and succumbed in three sets. She reached the second round in Indian Wells by beating Kristina Barrois, while serving a WTA season-high 18 aces, before losing a close match to 21st seed Andrea Petkovic. The following week as the 31st seed, she had a bye in round one in Miami. She then defeated Patty Schnyder and lost to fourth seed Sam Stosur.

Šafářová was forced to pull out of the Czech Fed Cup tie against Belgium the following week due to a left thigh problem. She attempted to play at Stuttgart, but lost to Barrois. She pulled out of Barcelona with the same leg injury. Her next tournament was the Premier Madrid Open. She defeated Anabel Medina Garrigues by coming back from match point down in the third set. She followed this victory with a three-set win over seventh seed Jelena Janković in round two and a two-set win over Jarmila Gajdošová in round three. These victories meant that for the second consecutive year, she had made the quarterfinals in Madrid. In the quarterfinals, she lost a hard-fought match to fourth seed Victoria Azarenka in three sets. In Rome the following week, she began with a win over Kimiko Date-Krumm. In the second round, she fell to Jelena Janković.

Unseeded at the French Open, Šafářová opened with an easy win over Kirsten Flipkens. In round two, she was up a set and a break against 17th seeded German Julia Görges, but eventually succumbed in three sets. In the doubles event, she and Michaëlla Krajicek opened with a win over Miami champions Radwańska and Hantuchová, and then defeated Pauline Parmentier and Kristina Mladenovic before falling to fifth-seeded Madrid Champions Victoria Azarenka and Maria Kirilenko. Reaching the third round marked her best doubles result at the French Open up to that point in her career.

As the fourth seed in Copenhagen, Šafářová made a series of tough three-set wins by never winning the first set. However, after beating Johanna Konta, Michaëlla Krajicek, Zhang Shuai, and Petra Martić (after trailing by a set and 4–0), she lost the final to home favourite and world No. 1, Caroline Wozniacki. She then traveled to Eastbourne, where she lost in the opening round to eventual champion Marion Bartoli despite holding a match point.

At Wimbledon, Šafářová was seeded 31st. She defeated fellow Czech Lucie Hradecká in the first round in three sete. This victory was her first win at Wimbledon since 2007. She was defeated by another Czech, Klára Zakopalová, in the second round. She next played on clay in Båstad, but was taken out by Vesna Dolonc in straight sets in the first round. She then pulled out of tournaments in Baku and San Diego before returning to the tour in Toronto. Following wins over Polona Hercog and Simona Halep, she took out eighth seeded Francesca Schiavone to reach her second Toronto quarterfinal. She lost this match to eventual champion Serena Williams in three sets. In Cincinnati the following week, she defeated Klára Zakopalová in the first round, but lost her second round match to the fifth seed, Li Na.

Seeded 27th at the US Open, Šafářová began by defeating Magdaléna Rybáriková. The victory was her first US Open win since 2007. She then defeated wild card Madison Keys before a disappointing third round loss to Monica Niculescu. In Quebec City the week following the US Open, she lost in round two to Andrea Hlaváčková as the second seed. After taking a small break, she re-entered the tour in Beijing, but lost in the first round to Petkovic. She followed this tournament up with a semifinal appearance in Linz, Austria, where she lost to Dominika Cibulková. The following week in the premier Moscow event, she took out second-seed Agnieszka Radwańska in round two before losing to Kaia Kanepi in the semifinals in three sets. To finish the year, Šafářová was a part of the Czech Fed Cup team that had qualified for the final against Russia. Despite losing both her matches to the higher-ranked Svetlana Kuznetsova and Anastasia Pavlyuchenkova, she and the Czech team won 3–2 to win their first championship as the Czech Republic (Czechoslovakia had previously won five Fed Cup titles).

=== 2012 ===
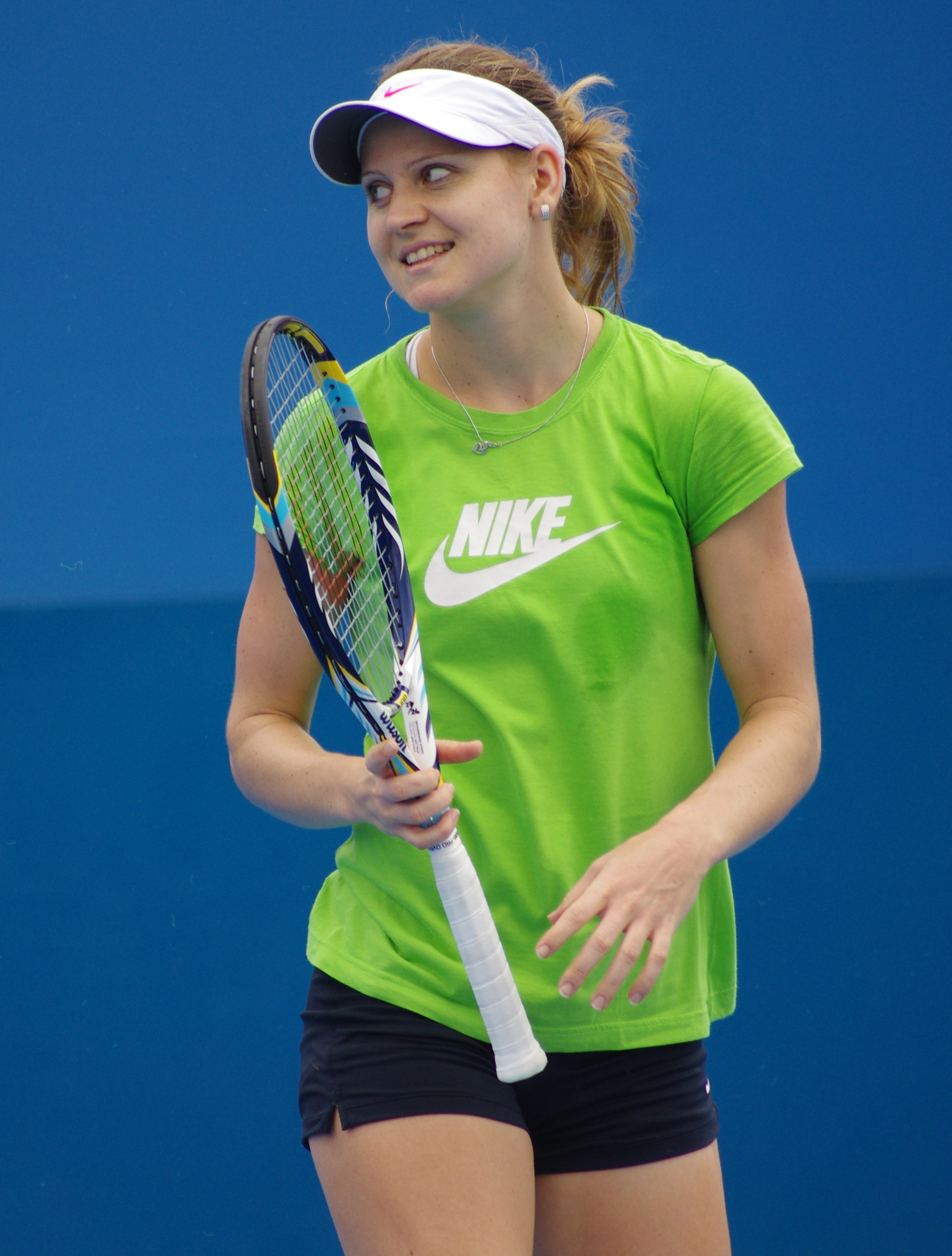
Šafářová in 2012

Šafářová reached the quarterfinals in Sydney, but lost to Li Na in two sets. She was taken out in the first round of the Australian Open by Christina McHale. On 23 March 2012 at the Miami Open, she lost to Heather Watson of Great Britain in a match lasting one hour, 20 minutes. The young British player was ranked No. 129 in the world. At the London Olympics, Šafářová competed in the women's singles and the women's doubles, but lost in the first round of both competitions. She reached the semifinals of the Canadian Open in Montreal, where she lost to Li Na in three sets. With this result, she was ranked well within the top 20 for the first time in her career. In 2012, she also helped the Czech team defend its Fed Cup title. She won both her singles matches against Ana Ivanovic and Jelena Janković in the final against Serbia. Her victory against Janković clinched a 3–1 victory for the Czechs.

=== 2013 ===
In 2013, Šafářová did not advance past the second round at any of the Grand Slams in singles. She was more successful in doubles. Partnering with Anastasia Pavlyuchenkova, they reached the quarterfinals at both the Australian Open and the French Open. The week following the US Open, Šafářová won her fifth WTA singles title at the Challenge Bell.

=== 2014: First major semifinal ===
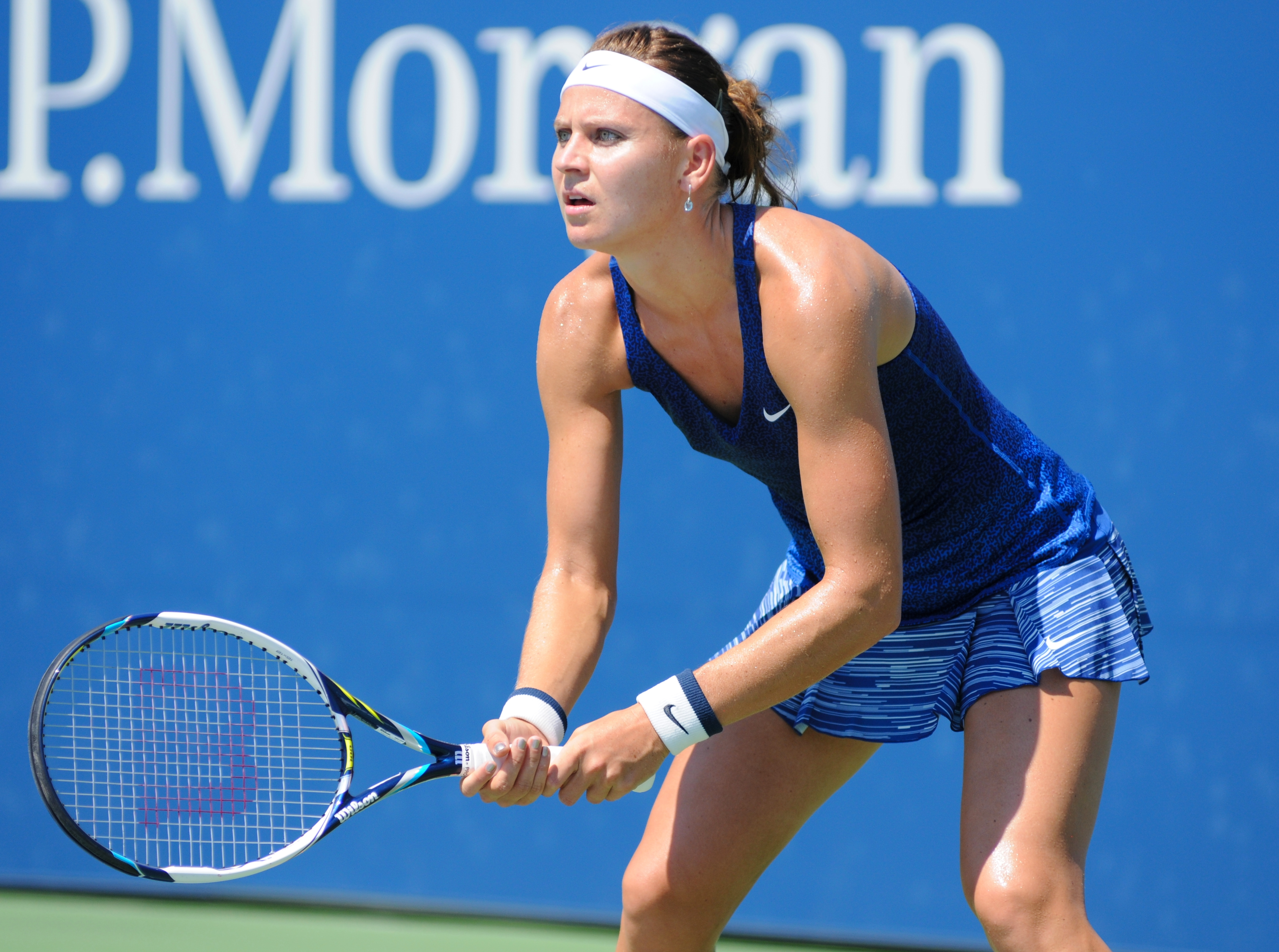
Šafářová at the 2014 US Open

Šafářová had a match point in the third round of the Australian Open against Li Na, but was eventually beaten in three sets as Li went on to win her second major title. At the Miami Open, she lost in three tight sets to Maria Sharapova in the third round. She would go on to lose to Sharapova again in the first round of the Porsche Tennis Grand Prix. At Roland Garros, she was the 23rd seed and defeated the in-form Ana Ivanovic in the third round, but lost in the next round to Svetlana Kuznetsova, in straight sets. At Wimbledon, she reached her first ever Grand Slam semifinal, where she lost in two sets to fellow Czech Petra Kvitová. In November, Šafárová was a part of the Czech Fed Cup team that played the final against Germany. In front of the home crowd at the O2 Arena in Prague, she won her singles match against Angelique Kerber in straight sets, which contributed to a 3–1 victory for the Czech team.

=== 2015: Major doubles titles, singles final & top-5 player, struggles with illness ===
Šafářová had a slow start to the year with a first-round loss at the Sydney International to Samantha Stosur. At the Australian Open, she suffered another first-round exit to Yaroslava Shvedova. Despite the early loss in singles, she rebounded by capturing her first Grand Slam title in doubles. Partnering with Bethanie Mattek-Sands, they defeated the 14th seeded team of Chan Yung-jan and Zheng Jie.

Šafářová then played at Antwerp and lost in the quarterfinals to fellow Czech Karolína Plíšková. She next traveled to Dubai where she made it to the quarterfinals by upsetting defending champion Venus Williams along the way. However, in the quarterfinals she lost again to Plíšková. At the Qatar Open, she defeated former Grand Slam champion Samantha Stosur, fifth seed Ekaterina Makarova, sixth seed Andrea Petkovic, and ninth seed Carla Suárez Navarro en route to her first final in over a year. In the final, she defeated former No. 1, Victoria Azarenka, in straight sets to win her first WTA Premier tournaments title. She then lost early at both the Indian Wells and the Miami Open to Elina Svitolina and Johanna Larsson, respectively. Next, she played for the Czech Republic in the semifinals against France at the Fed Cup, where she beat Caroline Garcia in three sets after saving five match points. The Czech Republic would go on to win the tie to advance to the finals for the fourth time in five years.

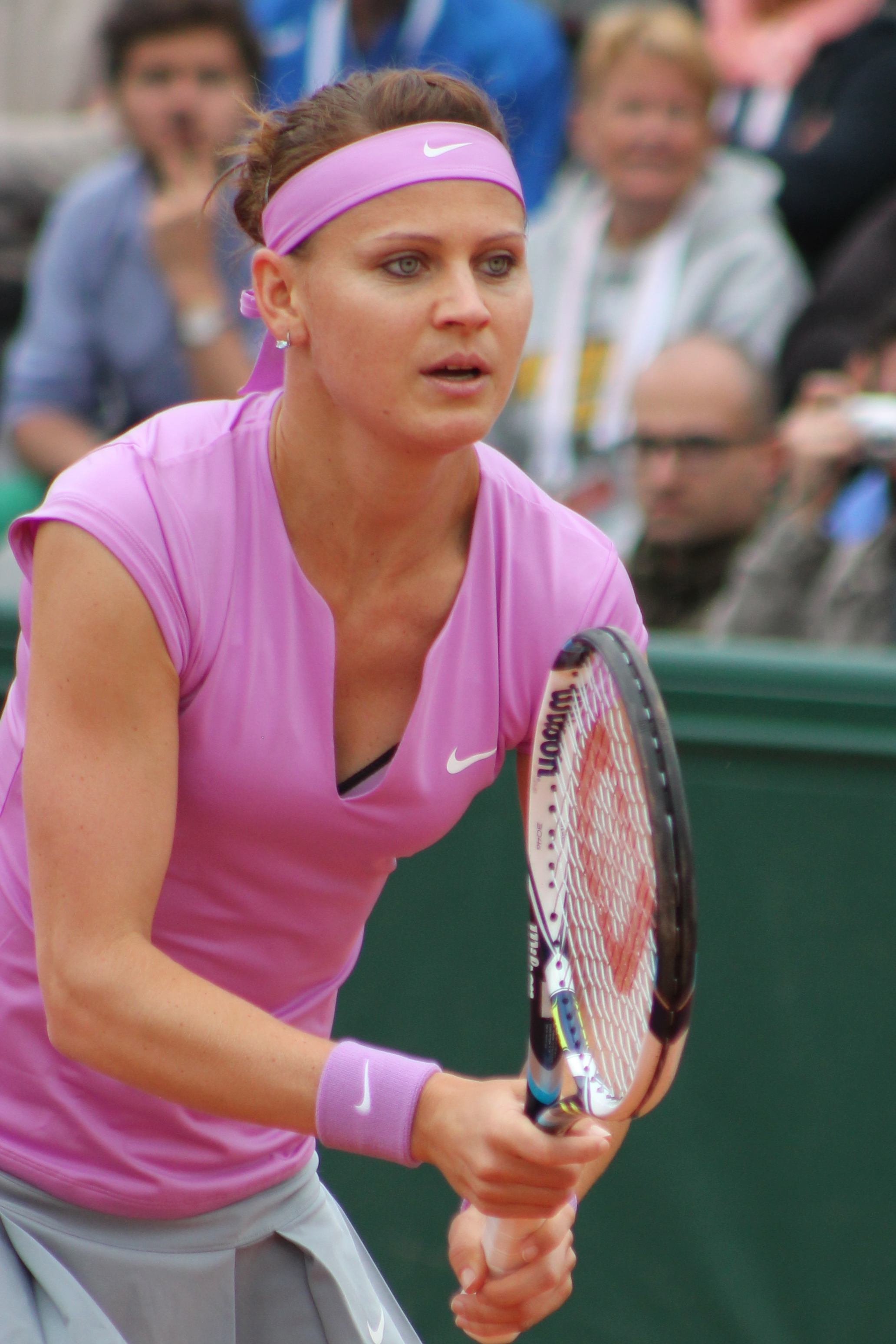
Šafářová at the 2015 French Open

Šafářová began her clay season in Stuttgart where she lost in the second round to eventual finalist Caroline Wozniacki in straight sets, but she would go on to win the doubles title with Mattek-Sands. She then played at the Prague Open and lost in the first round to Tereza Smitková. Next, she played at the Madrid Open and made it to the quarterfinals, where she lost to eventual finalist Svetlana Kuznetsova in three sets. In that match, she had been up 5–2 in the second set tiebreak and also failed to convert two match points on her own serve in the third set. She then lost in the second round at the Italian Open to Alexandra Dulgheru in three sets.

Šafářová started her French Open singles campaign by defeating long time friend Anastasia Pavlyuchenkova in two tiebreakers. She went on to defeat Kurumi Nara and 20th seed Sabine Lisicki, which set up a clash with the defending champion Maria Sharapova in the fourth round. She won the match in straight sets. It was Sharapova's earliest French Open loss since 2010. In the quarterfinals, she played the 21st seed Garbiñe Muguruza and won in straight sets to advance to her second semifinal in a major. With her quarterfinal win, she secured her place in the top 10. She then defeated former champion Ana Ivanovic in two tight sets to advance to her first ever Grand Slam tournament final, which she lost to Serena Williams in three sets. In doubles she and Mattek-Sands claimed their second Grand Slam title of the year by beating Yaroslava Shvedova and Casey Dellacqua in three sets in the final. With this win she moved up to No. 5 in doubles.

Šafářová began the grass-court season by playing in Eastbourne International. She lost her first match to Dominika Cibulková, in straight sets. Next, she played at the Wimbledon Championships. She reached the fourth round, but was then defeated by unseeded CoCo Vandeweghe in two tiebreakers. In the North American hard court season, Šafářová participated in the Rogers Cup, but lost in the second round to Daria Gavrilova after receiving a first round bye. This loss occurred despite having a 6–4, 5–5, 30–0 lead on her serve. She then reached the quarterfinals of the Cincinnati Open, where she lost to Elina Svitolina in three sets.

Šafářová reached the final of the Connecticut Open, but lost to defending champion Petra Kvitová. She then lost in the first round of the US Open to Lesia Tsurenko in straight sets. The rest of Šafářová's season was blighted by a bacterial infection which hospitalized her. As a result, she was unable to play for most of the autumn and early winter. She managed to play in the Linz Open and the Moscow Open, but she lost her opening matches in both tournaments. Since Serena Williams withdrew from the tournament, Šafářová was able to play the WTA Finals for the first time in her career. She failed to advance to the semifinals as she lost to Muguruza and Kvitová in round-robin matches, but she did get a win by beating eventual world No. 1 and two-time Grand Slam champion, Angelique Kerber, in straight sets to finish the round with a record of 1–2. She closed the year once again in the Fed Cup Finals, where the Czech Republic won their fourth title in five years. She was not chosen to play in any of the matches.

=== 2016: Continuous struggles with injuries, first Olympic medal and US Open doubles title ===
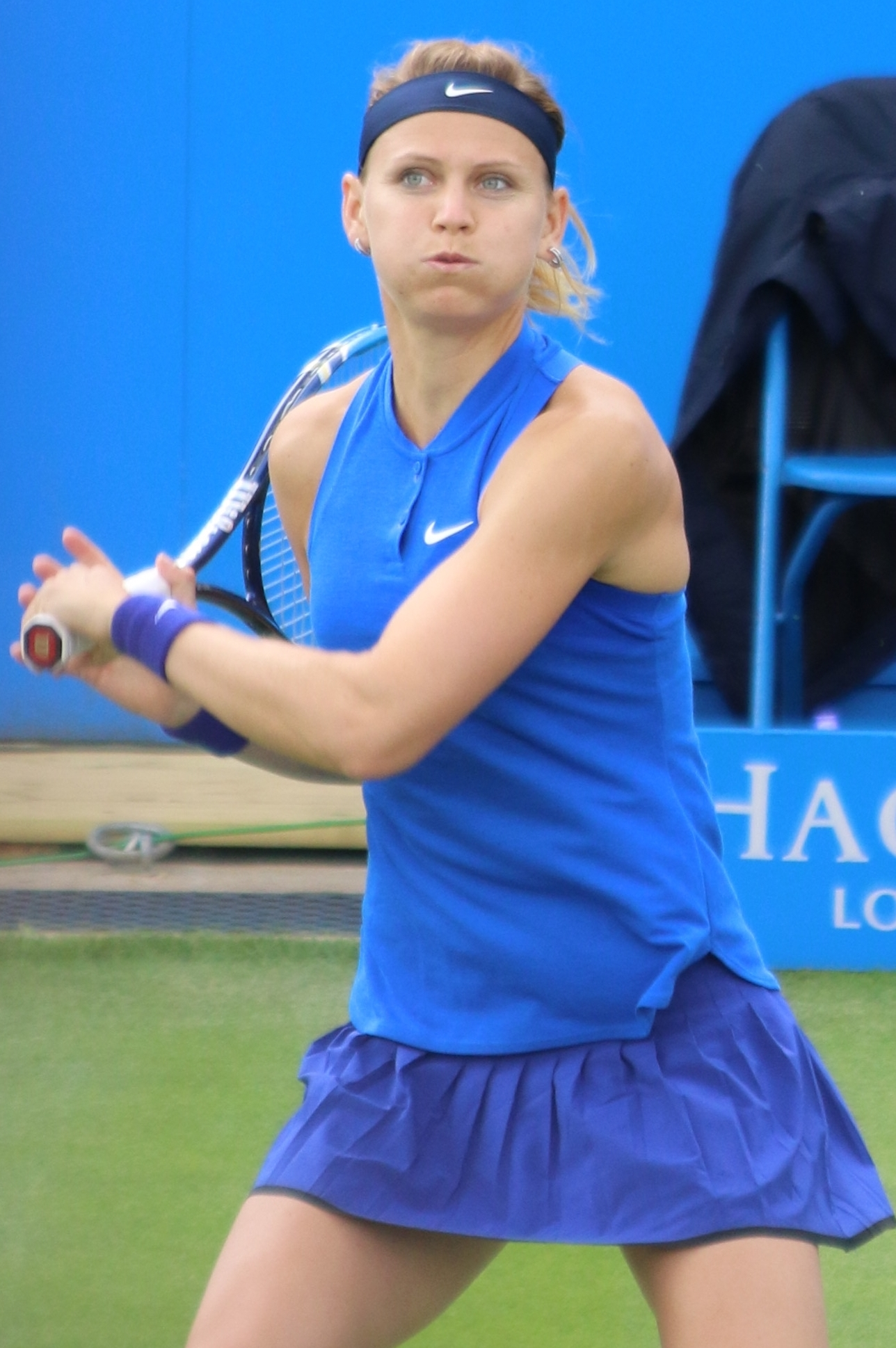
Šafářová at the 2016 Birmingham Classic

Šafářová skipped the whole Australian series, including the Australian Open and thus failing to defend her doubles title, due to the same bacterial infection which hospitalized her at the end of 2015. She returned to tennis at the Qatar Open, where she was the defending champion. However, she lost to Turkish wild card Çağla Büyükakçay.

In Indian Wells, Šafářová lost to Yaroslava Shvedova in the second round after receiving a bye as the 11th seed. Šafářová then partnered Ekaterina Makarova in doubles as the fifth seed, but they lost to Andreja Klepač and Katarina Srebotnik in the first round. As the 11th seed in the Miami Open, Šafářová received a bye into the second round where she faced Yanina Wickmayer. However, she lost the match in straight sets. For doubles, she partnered with her usual partner Bethanie Mattek-Sands for their first tournament together in 2016. They defeated Sloane Stephens and Madison Keys and then Daria Kasatkina Elena Vesnina to set up a blockbuster meeting with Australian Open finalists Andrea Hlaváčková and Lucie Hradecká, who are known as "The Silent-Hs". Mattek-Sands and Šafářová prevailed in straight sets, and dominated Chinese pairing Xu Yifan and Zheng Saisai in the semifinals. They then defeated the fourth seeds Tímea Babos and Yaroslava Shvedova in the final, winning their first title together of the year.

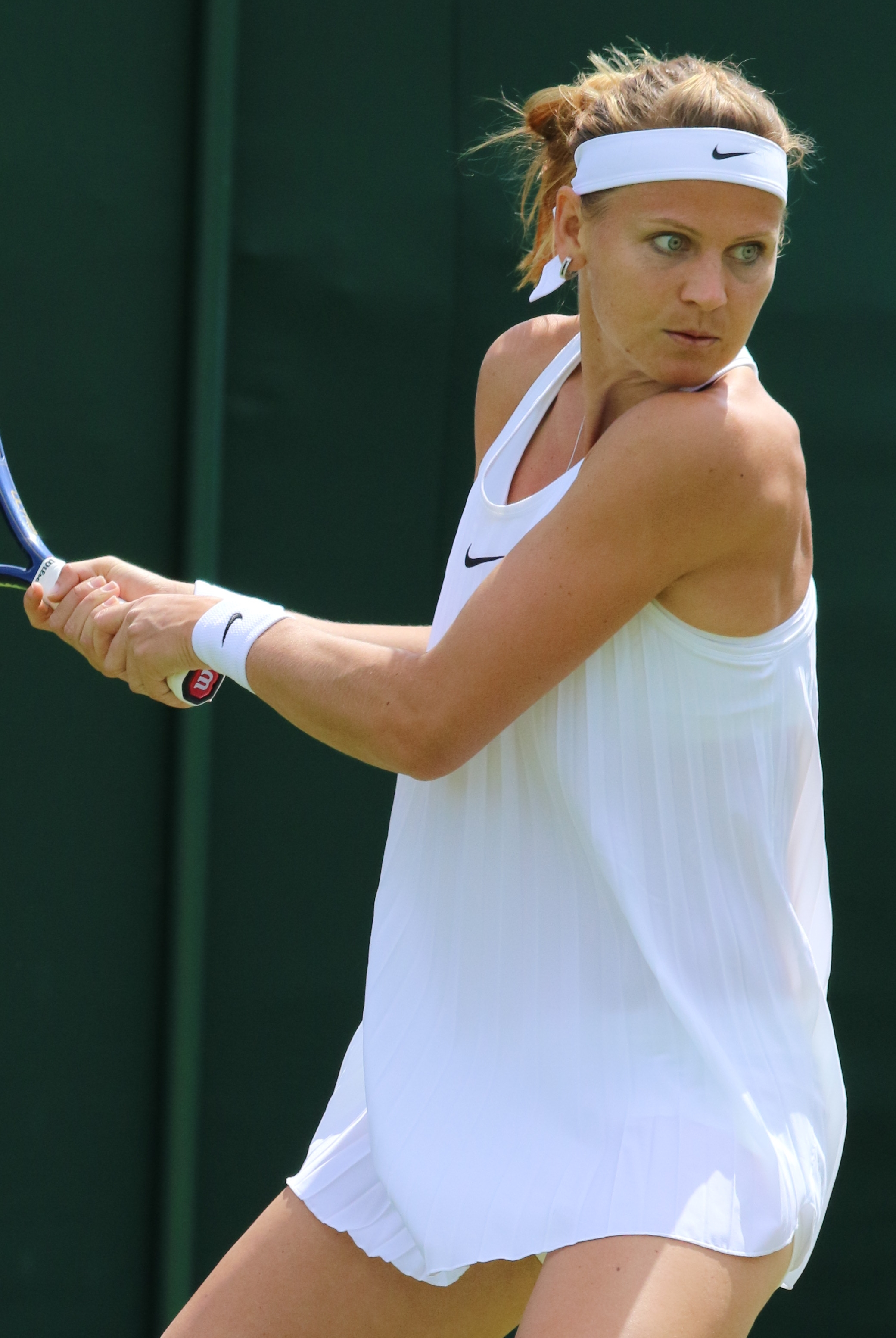
Šafářová at the 2016 Wimbledon Championships

Šafářová's next tournament was the Charleston Open. As the fourth seed in singles, she lost to Louisa Chirico in her opening singles match after receiving a first-round bye. Top-seeded in doubles, Šafářová and Mattek-Sands proceeded to the final after winning all their matches in straight sets, but then lost to Caroline Garcia and Kristina Mladenovic. Next, she played in the Stuttgart Open and lost in the first round to Karolína Plíšková.

Šafářová turned her season around by winning her seventh career title at the Prague Open. She won her first singles match of the year in the first round against Duque Mariño, whom she beat in three sets. She followed this result up with a second-round win over compatriot Lucie Hradecká 6–4, 2–0 (ret.). In the quarterfinal she beat Hsieh Su-wei in straight sets. In the semifinals she avenged her Stuttgart defeat to compatriot Karolína Plíšková by beating her in straight sets. In the final she delighted a home crowd by coming from a set down to beat Grand Slam champion Samantha Stosur. This result ended her title drought of more than a year since her Doha win. Next, she played in the Madrid Open. She defeated CoCo Vandeweghe in the first round, but withdrew from the tournament, both from singles and doubles due to gastrointestinal illness. At the Rio Olympics, she won her first-round singles match, but retired in her second round match after losing the first set. However, she recovered in time for doubles and on 13 August 2016, she won her first ever Olympic medal, which was a bronze with her partner Barbora Strýcová.

At the US Open, Šafářová was unseeded in singles. She won in the first round against Daria Gavrilova, but lost in the second round to fifth seed Simona Halep. In doubles, she teamed once again with Mattek-Sands. They were seeded 12th and would go on to win their third Grand Slam title together. In the semifinals they defeated the fifth seeded Russian team of Makarova and Vesnina, who had just defeated Mattek-Sands and Šafářová the month before in the semifinals of the Olympics and gone on to win the gold medal. In the final, Mattek-Sands and Šafářová defeated the French team of Garcia and Mladenovic, who had won the French Open earlier in the year.

Šafářová and Mattek-Sands would team up to win two more tournaments in 2016, Wuhan and Beijing. Their performance during the season qualified them for the WTA Finals, where they made the finals, but lost to Makarova and Vesnina. Šafářová ended the year ranked sixth in doubles.

=== 2017: Australian and French Open doubles champion and world No. 1 in doubles ===
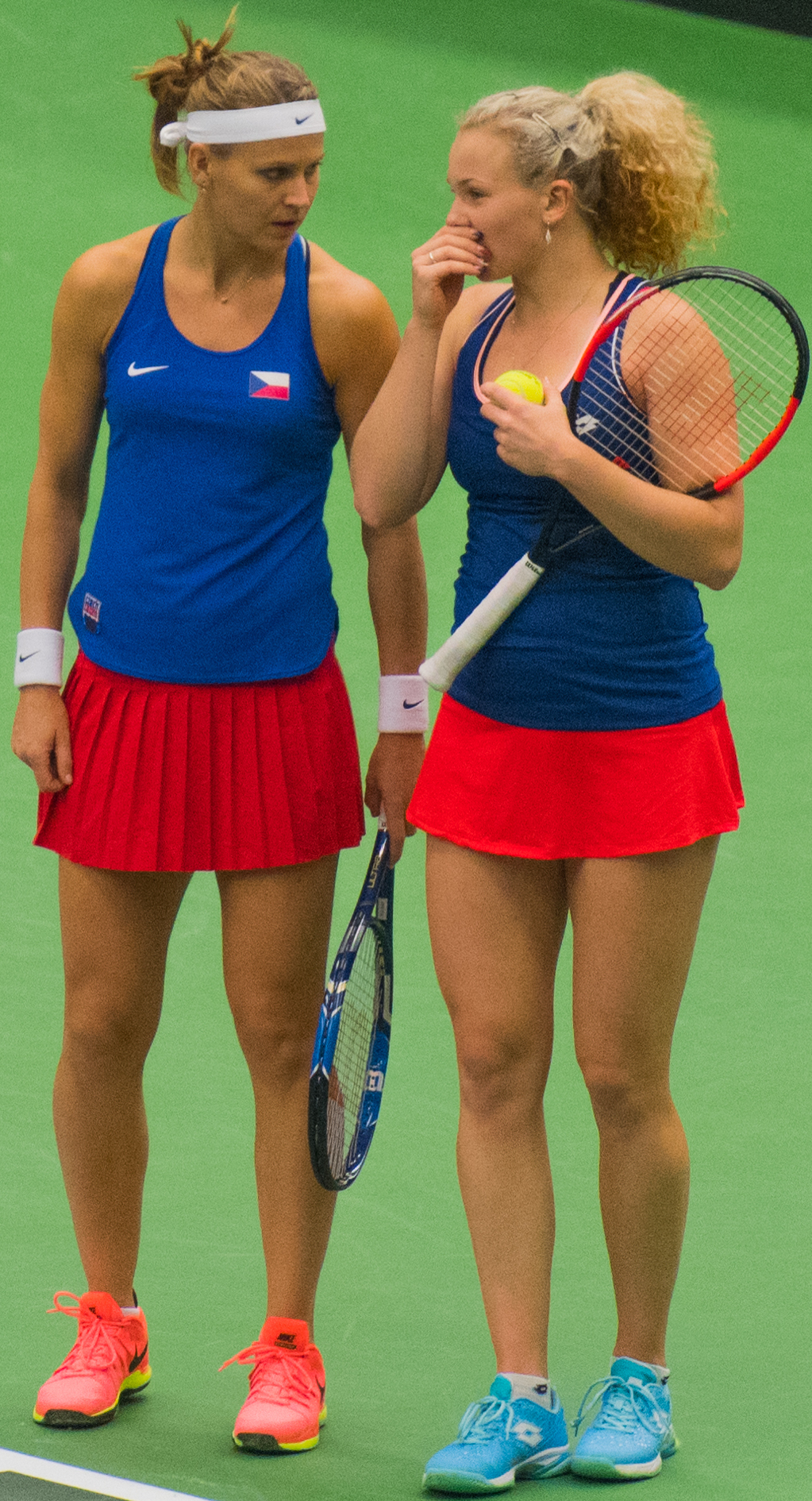
Šafářová with Siniaková (right) in a 2017 Fed Cup doubles rubber against Spain

In Hobart, Šafářová defeated Viktorija Golubic in the first round, but then she lost to qualifier Risa Ozaki. At the Australian Open, Šafářová defeated Yanina Wickmayer in the first round, after defending nine match points. In the second round, she lost to eventual champion Serena Williams. In doubles, Šafářová and Mattek-Sands won their fourth Grand Slam title, defeating Andrea Hlaváčková and Peng Shuai in the final.

Šafářová reached the semifinals in Taipei, where she lost to Peng. She played for the Czech Republic in the Fed Cup quarterfinals against Spain in a dead rubber alongside Kateřina Siniaková. They lost to María José Martínez Sánchez and Sara Sorribes Tormo. In Budapest, Šafářová lost in the final to Tímea Babos. These two players were the top seeds of the tournament. They also partnered in doubles, where they withdrew before the semifinal match.

Šafářová and Mattek-Sands would continue their doubles success in the spring. They won at Charleston, and then won another Grand Slam title at the French Open. Šafářová would not have as much success in singles during this time. She lost in the first round at the French and then in the second round at Wimbledon. Also at Wimbledon, Mattek-Sands injured her knee in a singles match causing the duo to withdraw from the tournament after winning a first round match.

At the US Open, Šafářová defeated Anett Kontaveit, Nao Hibino and Kurumi Nara, before losing to CoCo Vandeweghe in the fourth round.

=== 2018: Struggles with injuries and health ===
Šafářová started the new season in Sydney. In singles, she lost in the first round to Angelique Kerber. In doubles, she played alongside Barbora Strýcová. They withdrew before their semifinal match against Gabriela Dabrowski and Xu Yifan. At the Australian Open, Šafářová defeated Ajla Tomljanović and Sorana Cîrstea, before losing to Karolína Plíšková in the third round. In doubles, Šafářová and Strýcová lost in the quarterfinals to Hsieh Su-wei and Peng Shuai. In Wimbledon, she defeated Bondarenko and Radwańska, losing in the third round to Makarova in three sets. Playing doubles with Mattek-Sands, they were losing in the quarterfinals.

In Montreal, Šafářová lost in second round to Julia Görges. In doubles with Mattek-Sands, they lost in the first round to Ashleigh Barty and Demi Schuurs.

=== 2019-2024: Retirement & comeback ===
On 10 November 2018, Šafářová announced she would retire from the singles and doubles at the Australian Open. She stated, the decision was based on her health issues. However, on 4 January 2019, she announced that due to body ailments, she would be pulling out of the Australian Open and her farewell tournament would come at a later date. In March 2019, she stated her final tournament would be at the Prague Open. However, she later said that she would retire at the 2019 French Open. She partnered there with Dominika Cibulková, and they lost in the first round 4–6, 0–6 to Sofia Kenin and Andrea Petkovic.

In 2023, she entered the tournament Internationaux de Reims-Champagne and won her first-round match but later withdrew from playing because participating in the tournament by the rules was qualified as “official comeback to professional tennis” which this, by her words, wasn’t.

She returned to the WTA Tour at the 2024 Prague Open as a wildcard pair partnering Mattek-Sands and reached the final where they lost to top seeds Barbora Krejčíková and Kateřina Siniaková.

== Personal life ==
Apart from her native Czech, Šafářová also can speak German and English.

On 4 July 2019, Šafářová posted on her Instagram that she was excited to be expecting a baby with former NHL player Tomáš Plekanec. She announced the birth of her daughter later that year. Šafářová married Plekanec in 2021 and they announced birth of their son later in 2022.

== Career statistics ==
=== Grand Slam tournament performance timelines ===
Key
W	F	SF	QF	#R	RR	Q#	DNQ	A	NH

(W) winner; (F) finalist; (SF) semifinalist; (QF) quarterfinalist; (#R) rounds 4, 3, 2, 1; (RR) round-robin stage; (Q#) qualification round; (DNQ) did not qualify; (A) absent; (NH) not held; (SR) strike rate (events won / competed); (W–L) win–loss record.

==== Singles ====
Tournament	2004	2005	2006	2007	2008	2009	2010	2011	2012	2013	2014	2015	2016	2017	2018	SR	W–L
Australian Open	A	Q1	1R	QF	1R	3R	1R	3R	1R	2R	3R	1R	A	2R	3R	0 / 12	14–12
French Open	A	1R	1R	4R	2R	2R	2R	2R	2R	1R	4R	F	3R	1R	2R	0 / 14	20–14
Wimbledon	A	1R	A	3R	1R	1R	1R	2R	1R	2R	SF	4R	4R	2R	3R	0 / 13	18–13
US Open	Q2	1R	2R	3R	1R	1R	1R	3R	3R	2R	4R	1R	2R	4R	2R	0 / 14	16–14
Win–loss	0–0	0–3	1–3	11–4	1–4	3–4	1–4	6–4	3–4	3–4	13–4	9–4	6–3	5–4	6–4	0 / 53	68–53

==== Doubles ====
Tournament	2005	2006	2007	2008	2009	2010	2011	2012	2013	2014	2015	2016	2017	2018	2019	SR	W–L	Win%
Australian Open	A	1R	1R	A	3R	1R	2R	1R	QF	QF	W	A	W	QF	A	2 / 11	23–9	72%
French Open	A	1R	1R	1R	2R	2R	3R	1R	QF	1R	W	1R	W	2R	1R	2 / 14	20–12	63%
Wimbledon	1R	A	1R	1R	1R	2R	1R	1R	1R	QF	QF	1R	2R	QF	A	0 / 13	11–12	48%
US Open	1R	1R	1R	2R	1R	2R	1R	1R	3R	2R	A	W	SF	2R	A	1 / 13	15–12	56%
Win–loss	0–2	0–3	0–4	1–3	3–4	3–4	3–4	0–4	8–4	7–4	15–1	6–2	16–1	7–4	0–1	5 / 49	65–43	60%

=== Grand Slam tournament finals ===
==== Singles: 1 (runner-up) ====
Result	Year	Championship	Surface	Opponent	Score
Loss	2015	French Open	Clay	(United States) Serena Williams	3–6, 7–6^{(7–2)}, 2–6

==== Doubles: 5 (5 titles) ====
Result	Year	Championship	Surface	Partner	Opponents	Score
Win	2015	Australian Open	Hard	(United States) Bethanie Mattek-Sands	(Chinese Taipei) Chan Yung-jan (China) Zheng Jie	6–4, 7–6^{(7–5)}
Win	2015	French Open	Clay	(United States) Bethanie Mattek-Sands	(Kazakhstan) Yaroslava Shvedova (Australia) Casey Dellacqua	3–6, 6–4, 6–2
Win	2016	US Open	Hard	(United States) Bethanie Mattek-Sands	(France) Caroline Garcia (France) Kristina Mladenovic	2–6, 7–6^{(7–5)}, 6–4
Win	2017	Australian Open (2)	Hard	(United States) Bethanie Mattek-Sands	(Czech Republic) Andrea Hlaváčková (China) Peng Shuai	6–7^{(4–7)}, 6–3, 6–3
Win	2017	French Open (2)	Clay	(United States) Bethanie Mattek-Sands	(Australia) Ashleigh Barty (Australia) Casey Dellacqua	6–2, 6–1

=== Year-end championship finals ===
==== Doubles: 1 (runner-up) ====
Result	Year	Location	Surface	Partner	Opponents	Score
Loss	2016	Singapore	Hard (i)	(United States) Bethanie Mattek-Sands	(Russia) Ekaterina Makarova (Russia) Elena Vesnina	6–7^{(5–7)}, 3–6
