= 1974 First Federal of Sarasota Classic =

- Date: April 8–14
- Edition: 2nd
- Category: Virginia Slims circuit
- Draw: 32S / 16D
- Prize money: $50,000
- Surface: Clay (green) / indoor
- Location: Sarasota, Florida, U.S.
- Venue: Palm Aire Racquet Club

Champions

Singles
- (United States) Chris Evert

Doubles
- (United States) Chris Evert / (Australia) Evonne Goolagong
← 1973 ·	Virginia Slims of Sarasota	· 1975 →

The First Federal of Sarasota Classic, also known as the Virginia Slims of Sarasota, was a women's tennis tournament played on outdoor green clay courts at the Palm Aire Racquet Club in Sarasota, Florida in the United States that was part of the 1974 Virginia Slims World Championship Series. It was the second edition of the tournament and was held from April 8 through April 14, 1974. First-seeded Chris Evert won the singles title and earned $10,000 first-prize money.

== Finals ==
=== Singles ===
(United States) Chris Evert defeated (Australia) Evonne Goolagong 6–4, 6–0

- It was Evert's 4th singles title of the year and the 27th of her career.

=== Doubles ===
(United States) Chris Evert / (Australia) Evonne Goolagong defeated (United States) Tory Fretz / (United States) Ceci Martinez 6–2, 6–2

== Prize money ==
Event	W	F	SF	QF	Round of 16	Round of 32
Singles	$10,000	$5,600	$2,800	$1,400	$700	$350
