= 1976 Virginia Slims of Sarasota =

- Date: February 23–29
- Edition: 4th
- Category: Virginia Slims circuit
- Draw: 34S / 16D
- Prize money: $75,000
- Surface: Carpet (Sporteze) / indoor
- Location: Sarasota, Florida, U.S.
- Venue: Robarts Sports Arena

Champions

Singles
- (United States) Chris Evert

Doubles
- (United States) Martina Navratilova / (Netherlands) Betty Stöve
← 1975 ·	Virginia Slims of Sarasota

The 1976 Virginia Slims of Sarasota was a women's tennis tournament played on indoor carpet courts at the Robarts Sports Arena in Sarasota, Florida that was part of the 1976 Virginia Slims World Championship Series. It was the fourth edition of the tournament and was held from February 23 through February 29, 1976. Second-seeded Chris Evert won the singles title and earned $15,000 first-prize money.

== Finals ==
=== Singles ===
(United States) Chris Evert defeated (Australia) Evonne Goolagong Cawley 6–3, 6–0

- It was Evert's 4th singles title of the year and the 59th of her career.

=== Doubles ===
(United States) Martina Navratilova / (Netherlands) Betty Stöve defeated (United States) Mona Guerrant / (France) Ann Kiyomura 6–1, 6–0

== Prize money ==
Event	W	F	3rd	4th	QF	Round of 16	Round of 32	Prelim. round
Singles	$15,000	$8,000	$4,650	$3,900	$1,900	$1,100	$550	$375
