= 1983 Lynda Carter Maybelline Classic =

Tennis tournament

- Date: November 7 – 13
- Edition: 4th
- Category: Virginia Slims Series
- Draw: 32S / 16D
- Prize money: $125,000
- Surface: Hard / outdoor
- Location: Deerfield Beach, Florida, U.S.

Champions

Singles
- (United States) Chris Evert-Lloyd

Doubles
- (United States) Bonnie Gadusek / (United States) Wendy White-Prausa
← 1982 ·	Maybelline Classic	· 1984 →

The 1983 Lynda Carter Maybelline Classic (also known as the Lynda Carter Classic) was a women's tennis tournament played on outdoor hard courts in Deerfield Beach, Florida in the United States that was part of the 1983 Virginia Slims World Championship Series. The tournament was held from November 7 through November 13, 1983. First-seeded Chris Evert-Lloyd won her fourth consecutive singles title at the event and earned $22,000 first-prize money.

== Finals ==
=== Singles ===
(United States) Chris Evert-Lloyd defeated (United States) Bonnie Gadusek 6–0, 6–4

- It was Evert-Lloyd's 6th singles title of the year and the 126th of her career.

=== Doubles ===
(United States) Bonnie Gadusek / (United States) Wendy White-Prausa defeated (United States) Pam Casale / (United States) Mary-Lou Daniels 6–1, 3–6, 6–3

- It was Gadusek's 1st career title. It was White-Prausa's 1st career title.

== Prize money ==
Event	W	F	SF	QF	Round of 16	Round of 32
Singles	$22,000	$11,000	$5,575	$2,800	$1,450	$725
