= 1980 Lynda Carter Classic =

- Date: October 13–19
- Edition: 1st
- Category: Colgate Series (AAA)
- Draw: 32S / 16D
- Prize money: $100,000
- Surface: Hard / outdoor
- Location: Deerfield Beach, Florida, U.S.
- Venue: Deer Creek Racquet Club

Champions

Singles
- (United States) Chris Evert-Lloyd

Doubles
- (United States) Andrea Jaeger / (Czechoslovakia) Regina Maršíková
| Maybelline Classic | · 1981 → |

The 1980 Lynda Carter Classic was a women's tennis tournament played on outdoor hard courts at the Deer Creek Racquet Club in Deerfield Beach, Florida in the United States that was part of the Colgate Series of the 1980 Avon Championships World Championship Series. It was the inaugural edition of the tournament and was held from October 13 through October 19, 1980. First-seeded Chris Evert-Lloyd won the singles title at the event and earned $20,000 first-prize money.

== Finals ==
=== Singles ===
(United States) Chris Evert-Lloyd defeated (United States) Andrea Jaeger 6–4, 6–1

- It was Evert-Lloyd's 7th singles title of the year and the 100th of her career.

=== Doubles ===
(United States) Andrea Jaeger / (Czechoslovakia) Regina Maršíková defeated (United States) Martina Navratilova / (United States) Candy Reynolds 1–6, 6–1, 6–2

- It was Jaeger's 2nd doubles title of the year and of her career. It was Maršíková's 2nd doubles title of the year and the 6th of her career

== Prize money ==
| Event | W | F | SF | QF | Round of 16 | Round of 32 |
| Singles | $20,000 | $10,000 | $4,800 | $2,200 | $1,100 | $550 |
