= 1975 WTA Tour =

Women's tennis circuit

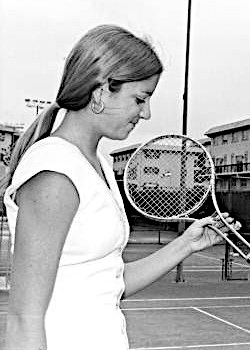
- Chris Evert finished the year as the inaugural world No. 1. She won 15 singles tournaments during the season, including two majors at the French Open and the US Open, as well as the Virginia Slims Championships.

Details
- Duration: 24 December 1974–21 December 1975
- Edition: 3rd
- Tournaments: 49
- Categories: Grand Slam (4); Virginia Slims championships Virginia Slims Circuit (10); Women's International Grand Prix (17); Non-Tour Events (15)

Achievements (singles)
- Most titles: (United States) Chris Evert (15)
- Most finals: (United States) Chris Evert (17)
- Prize money leader: (United States) Chris Evert ($370,227)

The 1975 WTA Tour consisted of a number of tennis tournaments for female tennis players. It was composed of the newly streamlined version of the Virginia Slims Circuit (which was now an 11-week tour of the United States) and the Woman's International Grand Prix. The year 1975 also saw the creation of the first official ranking system and these rankings were used to determine acceptance into the tournaments.

== Schedule ==
This is a calendar of all events which were part of either the Virginia Slims circuit or the Women's International Grand Prix in the year 1975, with player progression documented from the quarterfinals stage. Also included are the Grand Slam tournaments, the 1975 Virginia Slims Championships, the 1975 Federation Cup and a number of events not affiliated with either tour.

Key

Grand Slam tournaments
Virginia Slims championships
Virginia Slims Circuit
Women's International Grand Prix
ILTF independent events
Team events

=== December (1974) ===
Week	Tournament	Champions	Runners-up	Semifinalists	Quarterfinalists
23 Dec; 30 Dec	Australian Open; Melbourne, Australia; Grand Slam; Grass – 56S/24D; Singles – Doubles	(Australia) Evonne Goolagong; 6–3, 6–2	(Czechoslovakia) Martina Navratilova	(Soviet Union) Natasha Chmyreva (United Kingdom) Sue Barker	(Australia) Margaret Court (Australia) Christine Matison (Japan) Kazuko Sawamatsu (Soviet Union) Olga Morozova
23 Dec; 30 Dec	Australian Open; Melbourne, Australia; Grand Slam; Grass – 56S/24D; Singles – Doubles	(Australia) Evonne Goolagong (United States) Peggy Michel; 7–6, 7–6	(Australia) Margaret Court (Soviet Union) Olga Morozova	(Soviet Union) Natasha Chmyreva (United Kingdom) Sue Barker	(Australia) Margaret Court (Australia) Christine Matison (Japan) Kazuko Sawamatsu (Soviet Union) Olga Morozova

=== January ===
Week	Tournament	Champions	Runners-up	Semifinalists	Quarterfinalists
6 Jan	Virginia Slims of San Francisco; San Francisco, United States; Virginia Slims; Hard – $75,000 – 32S/8D	(United States) Chris Evert; 6–1, 6–1	(United States) Billie Jean King	(Czechoslovakia) Martina Navratilova (United Kingdom) Virginia Wade	(United States) Sue Stap (United States) Nancy Gunter (United States) Julie Heldman (France) Françoise Dürr
6 Jan	Virginia Slims of San Francisco; San Francisco, United States; Virginia Slims; Hard – $75,000 – 32S/8D	(United States) Chris Evert (United States) Billie Jean King; 6–2, 7–5	(United States) Rosie Casals (United Kingdom) Virginia Wade	(Czechoslovakia) Martina Navratilova (United Kingdom) Virginia Wade	(United States) Sue Stap (United States) Nancy Gunter (United States) Julie Heldman (France) Françoise Dürr
13 Jan	Virginia Slims of Sarasota; Sarasota, United States; Virginia Slims; Carpet (i) – $75,000 – 32S	(United States) Billie Jean King; 6–2, 6–3	(United States) Chris Evert	(United Kingdom) Virginia Wade (United States) Julie Heldman	(Argentina) Raquel Giscafré (United States) Nancy Gunter (Australia) Kerry Melville (United States) Wendy Overton
13 Jan	Virginia Slims of Sarasota; Sarasota, United States; Virginia Slims; Carpet (i) – $75,000 – 32S	(United States) Chris Evert (United States) Billie Jean King; 6–4, 6–2	(Netherlands) Betty Stöve (United Kingdom) Virginia Wade	(United Kingdom) Virginia Wade (United States) Julie Heldman	(Argentina) Raquel Giscafré (United States) Nancy Gunter (Australia) Kerry Melville (United States) Wendy Overton
27 Jan	Virginia Slims of Washington; Washington, United States; Virginia Slims; Hard – $75,000 – 32S/8D	(Czechoslovakia) Martina Navratilova; 6–3, 6–1	(Australia) Kerry Melville	(United Kingdom) Virginia Wade (Australia) Margaret Court	(United States) Chris Evert (United States) Valerie Ziegenfuss (United States) Janet Newberry (United States) Wendy Overton
27 Jan	Virginia Slims of Washington; Washington, United States; Virginia Slims; Hard – $75,000 – 32S/8D	(France) Françoise Dürr (Netherlands) Betty Stöve; 6–3, 6–4	(Australia) Helen Gourlay (Australia) Kerry Melville	(United Kingdom) Virginia Wade (Australia) Margaret Court	(United States) Chris Evert (United States) Valerie Ziegenfuss (United States) Janet Newberry (United States) Wendy Overton

=== February ===
Week	Tournament	Champions	Runners-up	Semifinalists	Quarterfinalists
3 Feb	Virginia Slims of Akron; Akron, United States; Virginia Slims; Carpet (i) – $75,000 – 32S	(United States) Chris Evert; 6–4, 3–6, 6–3	(Australia) Margaret Court	(United Kingdom) Virginia Wade (Soviet Union) Olga Morozova	(Czechoslovakia) Martina Navratilova (Socialist Federal Republic of Yugoslavia) Mima Jaušovec (United States) Nancy Gunter (United States) Julie Heldman
3 Feb	Virginia Slims of Akron; Akron, United States; Virginia Slims; Carpet (i) – $75,000 – 32S	(France) Françoise Dürr (Netherlands) Betty Stöve; 7–5, 7–6	(United States) Chris Evert (Czechoslovakia) Martina Navratilova	(United Kingdom) Virginia Wade (Soviet Union) Olga Morozova	(Czechoslovakia) Martina Navratilova (Socialist Federal Republic of Yugoslavia) Mima Jaušovec (United States) Nancy Gunter (United States) Julie Heldman
10 Feb	Virginia Slims of Chicago; Chicago, United States; Virginia Slims; Hard – $75,000 – 32S/10D	(Australia) Margaret Court; 6–3, 3–6, 6–2	(Czechoslovakia) Martina Navratilova	(United States) Chris Evert (United States) Wendy Overton	(United States) Julie Heldman (Soviet Union) Olga Morozova (United States) Nancy Gunter (Australia) Evonne Goolagong
10 Feb	Virginia Slims of Chicago; Chicago, United States; Virginia Slims; Hard – $75,000 – 32S/10D	(United States) Chris Evert (Czechoslovakia) Martina Navratilova; 6–2, 7–5	(Australia) Margaret Court (Soviet Union) Olga Morozova	(United States) Chris Evert (United States) Wendy Overton	(United States) Julie Heldman (Soviet Union) Olga Morozova (United States) Nancy Gunter (Australia) Evonne Goolagong
17 Feb	Virginia Slims of Detroit; Detroit, United States; Virginia Slims; Carpet (i) – $75,000 – 32S	(Australia) Evonne Goolagong; 6–3, 3–6, 6–3	(Australia) Margaret Court	(Czechoslovakia) Martina Navratilova (France) Françoise Dürr	(United States) Marcie Louie (Netherlands) Betty Stöve (Soviet Union) Olga Morozova (Argentina) Raquel Giscafré
17 Feb	Virginia Slims of Detroit; Detroit, United States; Virginia Slims; Carpet (i) – $75,000 – 32S	(Australia) Lesley Hunt (Czechoslovakia) Martina Navratilova; 2–6, 7–5, 6–2	(France) Françoise Dürr (Netherlands) Betty Stöve	(Czechoslovakia) Martina Navratilova (France) Françoise Dürr	(United States) Marcie Louie (Netherlands) Betty Stöve (Soviet Union) Olga Morozova (Argentina) Raquel Giscafré

=== March ===
Week	Tournament	Champions	Runners-up	Semifinalists	Quarterfinalists
3 Mar	Virginia Slims of Boston; Boston, United States; Virginia Slims; Carpet (i) – $75,000 – 32S/12D	(Czechoslovakia) Martina Navratilova; 6–2, 4–6, 6–3	(Australia) Evonne Goolagong	(Australia) Margaret Court (United States) Chris Evert	(Australia) Helen Gourlay (United Kingdom) Virginia Wade (Soviet Union) Olga Morozova (United States) Julie Heldman
3 Mar	Virginia Slims of Boston; Boston, United States; Virginia Slims; Carpet (i) – $75,000 – 32S/12D	(United States) Rosie Casals (United States) Billie Jean King; 6–3, 6–4	(United States) Chris Evert (Czechoslovakia) Martina Navratilova	(Australia) Margaret Court (United States) Chris Evert	(Australia) Helen Gourlay (United Kingdom) Virginia Wade (Soviet Union) Olga Morozova (United States) Julie Heldman
10 Mar	Virginia Slims of Houston; Houston, United States; Virginia Slims; Carpet (i) – $75,000 – 32S/12D	(United States) Chris Evert; 6–3, 6–2	(Australia) Margaret Court	(Soviet Union) Olga Morozova (Australia) Evonne Goolagong	(France) Françoise Dürr (United Kingdom) Virginia Wade (United States) Laura duPont (United States) Mona Schallau
10 Mar	Virginia Slims of Houston; Houston, United States; Virginia Slims; Carpet (i) – $75,000 – 32S/12D	(France) Françoise Dürr (Netherlands) Betty Stöve; 2–6, 6–3, 7–6^{(5–2)}	(Australia) Evonne Goolagong (United Kingdom) Virginia Wade	(Soviet Union) Olga Morozova (Australia) Evonne Goolagong	(France) Françoise Dürr (United Kingdom) Virginia Wade (United States) Laura duPont (United States) Mona Schallau
17 Mar	Virginia Slims of Dallas; Dallas, United States; Virginia Slims; Carpet (i) – $75,000 – 32S/10D	(United Kingdom) Virginia Wade; 2–6, 7–6^{(5–3)}, 4–3 ret.	(Czechoslovakia) Martina Navratilova	(France) Françoise Dürr (Australia) Evonne Goolagong	(United States) Terry Holladay (Soviet Union) Olga Morozova (United States) Sue Stap (United States) Julie Heldman
17 Mar	Virginia Slims of Dallas; Dallas, United States; Virginia Slims; Carpet (i) – $75,000 – 32S/10D	(France) Françoise Dürr (Netherlands) Betty Stöve; 7–6^{(5–4)}, 6–2	(United States) Mona Schallau (United States) Julie Anthony	(France) Françoise Dürr (Australia) Evonne Goolagong	(United States) Terry Holladay (Soviet Union) Olga Morozova (United States) Sue Stap (United States) Julie Heldman
24 Mar	Virginia Slims of Philadelphia; Philadelphia, United States; Virginia Slims; Carpet (i) – $75,000 – 32S/11D	(United Kingdom) Virginia Wade; 7–6, 6–4	(United States) Chris Evert	(United States) Billie Jean King (Czechoslovakia) Martina Navratilova	(United States) Wendy Overton (Australia) Evonne Goolagong (Soviet Union) Olga Morozova (United States) Nancy Gunter
24 Mar	Virginia Slims of Philadelphia; Philadelphia, United States; Virginia Slims; Carpet (i) – $75,000 – 32S/11D	(Australia) Evonne Goolagong (Netherlands) Betty Stöve; 4–6, 6–4, 7–6^{(5–3)}	(United States) Rosie Casals (United States) Billie Jean King	(United States) Billie Jean King (Czechoslovakia) Martina Navratilova	(United States) Wendy Overton (Australia) Evonne Goolagong (Soviet Union) Olga Morozova (United States) Nancy Gunter
31 Mar	Virginia Slims Championships; Los Angeles, United States; Year-end championships Carpet (i) – $150,000 – 16S (8RR)	(United States) Chris Evert; 6–4, 6–2	(Czechoslovakia) Martina Navratilova	(United Kingdom) Virginia Wade (3rd) (Australia) Evonne Goolagong (4th)	Round-robin; Gold Group (Soviet Union) Olga Morozova (United States) Marcie Louie; Green Group (United States) Julie Heldman (United States) Mona Schallau

=== April ===
Week	Tournament	Champions	Runners-up	Semifinalists	Quarterfinalists
7 April	Bridgestone Doubles Championships; Osaka & Tokyo, Japan; Women's International Grand Prix; Carpet (i) – $100,000 – 8D	(Australia) Margaret Court (United Kingdom) Virginia Wade; 6–7^{(2–5)}, 7–6^{(5–2)}, 6–2	(United States) Rosie Casals (United States) Billie Jean King	(Australia) Hunt / (Czechoslovakia) Navratilova (France) Dürr / (Netherlands) Stöve	(South Africa) Cuypers / (Australia) Gourlay (United States) Anthony / (United States) Schallau (United States) Heldman / (United States) Stap (United States) DuPont / (United States) Teeguarden
14 April	Four Woman L'Eggs World Series; Austin, United States; Non-tour event $100,000 – hard – 4S; Draw	(United States) Chris Evert; 4–6, 6–3, 7–6^{(5–2)}	(United States) Billie Jean King	(Australia) Evonne Goolagong (3rd) (Soviet Union) Olga Morozova (4th)	N/A
21 April	Family Circle Cup; Amelia Island, United States; Women's International Grand Prix; Clay – $150,000 – 32S/16D	(United States) Chris Evert; 7–5, 6–4	(Czechoslovakia) Martina Navratilova	(Australia) Evonne Goolagong (Soviet Union) Olga Morozova	(France) Françoise Dürr (United Kingdom) Virginia Wade (United States) Marcie Louie (United States) Julie Heldman
21 April	Family Circle Cup; Amelia Island, United States; Women's International Grand Prix; Clay – $150,000 – 32S/16D	(Australia) Evonne Goolagong (United Kingdom) Virginia Wade; 4–6, 6–4, 6–2	(United States) Rosie Casals (Soviet Union) Olga Morozova	(Australia) Evonne Goolagong (Soviet Union) Olga Morozova	(France) Françoise Dürr (United Kingdom) Virginia Wade (United States) Marcie Louie (United States) Julie Heldman

=== May ===
Week	Tournament	Champions	Runners-up	Semifinalists	Quarterfinalists
5 May	Federation Cup; Aix-en-Provence, France; Federation Cup; Clay – 31 teams knockout	Czechoslovakia; 3–0	Australia	United States; France	Italy; South Africa; Great Britain; West Germany
12 May	British Hard Court Championships; Bournemouth, Great Britain; Non-tour event Hard	(United States) Janet Newberry; 7–9, 7–5, 6–3	(United States) Terry Holladay	(Australia) Wendy Paish (Australia) Dianne Fromholtz	(United Kingdom) Michelle Tyler (South Africa) Rowena Whitehouse (United Kingdom) Lesley Charles (Japan) Kazuko Sawamatsu
12 May	British Hard Court Championships; Bournemouth, Great Britain; Non-tour event Hard	(United Kingdom) Lesley Charles (United Kingdom) Sue Mappin; 6–3, 6–3	(South Africa) Linky Boshoff (South Africa) Greer Stevens	(Australia) Wendy Paish (Australia) Dianne Fromholtz	(United Kingdom) Michelle Tyler (South Africa) Rowena Whitehouse (United Kingdom) Lesley Charles (Japan) Kazuko Sawamatsu
19 May	West German Championships; Hamburg, West Germany; Women's International Grand Prix; Clay – $30,000	(Czechoslovakia) Renáta Tomanová; 7–6, 5–7, 10–8	(Japan) Kazuko Sawamatsu	(West Germany) Iris Riedel (Socialist Federal Republic of Yugoslavia) Mima Jaušovec	(West Germany) Helga Masthoff (South Africa) Linky Boshoff (United States) Janet Newberry (Indonesia) Lany Kaligis
19 May	West German Championships; Hamburg, West Germany; Women's International Grand Prix; Clay – $30,000	(Australia) Dianne Fromholtz (Czechoslovakia) Renáta Tomanová; 6–3, 6–2	(Israel) Paulina Peisachov (Japan) Kazuko Sawamatsu	(West Germany) Iris Riedel (Socialist Federal Republic of Yugoslavia) Mima Jaušovec	(West Germany) Helga Masthoff (South Africa) Linky Boshoff (United States) Janet Newberry (Indonesia) Lany Kaligis
26 May	Italian Open; Rome, Italy; Women's International Grand Prix; Clay – $30,000	(United States) Chris Evert; 6–1, 6–0	(Czechoslovakia) Martina Navratilova	(Socialist Federal Republic of Yugoslavia) Mima Jaušovec (Australia) Dianne Fromholtz	(Uruguay) Fiorella Bonicelli (West Germany) Helga Masthoff (West Germany) Katja Ebbinghaus (South Africa) Linky Boshoff
26 May	Italian Open; Rome, Italy; Women's International Grand Prix; Clay – $30,000	(United States) Chris Evert (Czechoslovakia) Martina Navratilova; 6–1, 6–2	(United Kingdom) Sue Barker (United Kingdom) Glynis Coles	(Socialist Federal Republic of Yugoslavia) Mima Jaušovec (Australia) Dianne Fromholtz	(Uruguay) Fiorella Bonicelli (West Germany) Helga Masthoff (West Germany) Katja Ebbinghaus (South Africa) Linky Boshoff

=== June ===
Week	Tournament	Champions	Runners-up	Semifinalists	Quarterfinalists
2 Jun	French Open; Paris, France; Grand Slam; Clay – 64S/64Q/22D/24X; Singles – Doubles – Mixed doubles	(United States) Chris Evert; 2–6, 6–2, 6–1	(Czechoslovakia) Martina Navratilova	(United States) Janet Newberry (Soviet Union) Olga Morozova	(United States) Donna Ganz (Hungary) Éva Szabó (Argentina) Raquel Giscafré (Japan) Kazuko Sawamatsu
2 Jun	French Open; Paris, France; Grand Slam; Clay – 64S/64Q/22D/24X; Singles – Doubles – Mixed doubles	(United States) Chris Evert (Czechoslovakia) Martina Navratilova; 6–3, 6–2	(United States) Julie Anthony (Soviet Union) Olga Morozova	(United States) Janet Newberry (Soviet Union) Olga Morozova	(United States) Donna Ganz (Hungary) Éva Szabó (Argentina) Raquel Giscafré (Japan) Kazuko Sawamatsu
2 Jun	French Open; Paris, France; Grand Slam; Clay – 64S/64Q/22D/24X; Singles – Doubles – Mixed doubles	(Uruguay) Fiorella Bonicelli (Brazil) Thomaz Koch; 6–4, 7–6	(United States) Pam Teeguarden (Chile) Jaime Fillol	(United States) Janet Newberry (Soviet Union) Olga Morozova	(United States) Donna Ganz (Hungary) Éva Szabó (Argentina) Raquel Giscafré (Japan) Kazuko Sawamatsu
16 Jun	Eastbourne Championships; Eastbourne, Great Britain; Women's International Grand Prix; Grass – $25,000	(United Kingdom) Virginia Wade; 7–5, 4–6, 6–4	(United States) Billie Jean King	(United States) Rosie Casals (Soviet Union) Olga Morozova	(Sweden) Helena Anliot (United States) Pam Teeguarden (United Kingdom) Glynis Coles (South Africa) Linky Boshoff
16 Jun	Eastbourne Championships; Eastbourne, Great Britain; Women's International Grand Prix; Grass – $25,000	(United States) Julie Anthony (Soviet Union) Olga Morozova; 6–2, 6–4	(Australia) Evonne Goolagong Cawley (United States) Peggy Michel	(United States) Rosie Casals (Soviet Union) Olga Morozova	(Sweden) Helena Anliot (United States) Pam Teeguarden (United Kingdom) Glynis Coles (South Africa) Linky Boshoff
23 Jun; 30 Jun	Wimbledon Championships; London, Great Britain; Grand Slam; Grass – 96S/48D/64X; Singles – Doubles – Mixed doubles	(United States) Billie Jean King; 6–0, 6–1	(Australia) Evonne Goolagong Cawley	(United States) Chris Evert (Australia) Margaret Court	(Netherlands) Betty Stöve (Soviet Union) Olga Morozova (United Kingdom) Virginia Wade (Czechoslovakia) Martina Navratilova
23 Jun; 30 Jun	Wimbledon Championships; London, Great Britain; Grand Slam; Grass – 96S/48D/64X; Singles – Doubles – Mixed doubles	(United States) Ann Kiyomura (Japan) Kazuko Sawamatsu; 7–5, 1–6, 7–5	(France) Françoise Dürr (Netherlands) Betty Stöve	(United States) Chris Evert (Australia) Margaret Court	(Netherlands) Betty Stöve (Soviet Union) Olga Morozova (United Kingdom) Virginia Wade (Czechoslovakia) Martina Navratilova
23 Jun; 30 Jun	Wimbledon Championships; London, Great Britain; Grand Slam; Grass – 96S/48D/64X; Singles – Doubles – Mixed doubles	(Australia) Margaret Court (United States) Marty Riessen; 6–4, 7–5	(Netherlands) Betty Stöve (Australia) Allan Stone	(United States) Chris Evert (Australia) Margaret Court	(Netherlands) Betty Stöve (Soviet Union) Olga Morozova (United Kingdom) Virginia Wade (Czechoslovakia) Martina Navratilova

=== July ===
Week	Tournament	Champions	Runners-up	Semifinalists	Quarterfinalists
7 Jul	Swedish Open; Båstad, Sweden; Non-tour event Clay	(United Kingdom) Sue Barker; 6–4, 6–0	(West Germany) Helga Masthoff	(Sweden) Mimmi Wikstedt (United States) Pam Teeguarden	(Sweden) Helena Anliot (Argentina) Raquel Giscafré (Sweden) Lotta Stenberg (Sweden) Christina Sandberg
7 Jul	Swedish Open; Båstad, Sweden; Non-tour event Clay	(United States) Janet Newberry (United States) Pam Teeguarden; 6–3, 6–3	(Uruguay) Fiorella Bonicelli (Argentina) Raquel Giscafré	(Sweden) Mimmi Wikstedt (United States) Pam Teeguarden	(Sweden) Helena Anliot (Argentina) Raquel Giscafré (Sweden) Lotta Stenberg (Sweden) Christina Sandberg
14 Jul	Austrian Open; Kitzbühel, Austria; Non-tour event Clay	(United Kingdom) Sue Barker; 6–4, 6–4	(United States) Pam Teeguarden	(West Germany) Katja Ebbinghaus (Australia) Dianne Fromholtz	(Uruguay) Fiorella Bonicelli (Argentina) Raquel Giscafré (Hungary) Marie Pinterová (Austria) Marketa Wallenfels
14 Jul	Austrian Open; Kitzbühel, Austria; Non-tour event Clay	(United Kingdom) Sue Barker (United States) Pam Teeguarden; 6–4, 6–3	(Uruguay) Fiorella Bonicelli (Argentina) Raquel Giscafré	(West Germany) Katja Ebbinghaus (Australia) Dianne Fromholtz	(Uruguay) Fiorella Bonicelli (Argentina) Raquel Giscafré (Hungary) Marie Pinterová (Austria) Marketa Wallenfels

=== August ===
Week	Tournament	Champions	Runners-up	Semifinalists	Quarterfinalists
4 Aug	US Clay Court Championships; Indianapolis, United States; Women's International Grand Prix; Clay – $30,000; Singles – Doubles	(United States) Chris Evert; 6–3, 6–4	(Australia) Dianne Fromholtz	(United States) Nancy Gunter (West Germany) Katja Ebbinghaus	(United States) Donna Ganz (United States) Janet Newberry (West Germany) Iris Riedel (United States) Julie Heldman
4 Aug	US Clay Court Championships; Indianapolis, United States; Women's International Grand Prix; Clay – $30,000; Singles – Doubles	(Uruguay) Fiorella Bonicelli (Colombia) Isabel Fernández de Soto; 3–6, 7–5, 6–3	(France) Gail Chanfreau (United States) Julie Heldman	(United States) Nancy Gunter (West Germany) Katja Ebbinghaus	(United States) Donna Ganz (United States) Janet Newberry (West Germany) Iris Riedel (United States) Julie Heldman
11 Aug	Rothmans Canadian Open; Toronto, Canada; Women's International Grand Prix; Clay – $30,000	(United States) Marcie Louie; 6–1, 4–6, 6–4	(United States) Laura duPont	(Colombia) Isabel Fernández de Soto (South Africa) Linky Boshoff	(Australia) Margaret Court (United States) Julie Anthony (Netherlands) Tine Zwaan (United States) Julie Heldman
11 Aug	Rothmans Canadian Open; Toronto, Canada; Women's International Grand Prix; Clay – $30,000	(United States) Julie Anthony (Australia) Margaret Court; 6–2, 6–4	(United States) JoAnne Russell (United States) Jane Stratton	(Colombia) Isabel Fernández de Soto (South Africa) Linky Boshoff	(Australia) Margaret Court (United States) Julie Anthony (Netherlands) Tine Zwaan (United States) Julie Heldman
18 Aug	South Orange Classic; South Orange, United States; Non-tour event Clay	(Romania) Virginia Ruzici; 6–1, 6–1	(Romania) Mariana Simionescu	(United States) Ruta Gerulaitis (United States) Kristien Shaw	(South Africa) Greer Stevens (United States) Mimi Kanarek (United States) Kathy May (United States) Kathleen Harter
18 Aug	South Orange Classic; South Orange, United States; Non-tour event Clay	(United States) Kristien Shaw (South Africa) Greer Stevens; Walkover	(United States) Kathleen Harter (United States) Kathy May	(United States) Ruta Gerulaitis (United States) Kristien Shaw	(South Africa) Greer Stevens (United States) Mimi Kanarek (United States) Kathy May (United States) Kathleen Harter
18 Aug	Medi-Quik Classic; New York City, United States; Women's International Grand Prix; Clay – $75,000	(United States) Chris Evert; 6–0, 6–1	(United Kingdom) Virginia Wade	3rd: (Australia) Margaret Court; 4th: (Australia) Dianne Fromholtz	(United States) Mona Schallau (West Germany) Iris Riedel (United States) Pam Teeguarden (Czechoslovakia) Martina Navratilova
18 Aug	Medi-Quik Classic; New York City, United States; Women's International Grand Prix; Clay – $75,000	(United States) Chris Evert (Czechoslovakia) Martina Navratilova; 7–5, 6–7, 6–4	(Australia) Margaret Court (United Kingdom) Virginia Wade	3rd: (Australia) Margaret Court; 4th: (Australia) Dianne Fromholtz	(United States) Mona Schallau (West Germany) Iris Riedel (United States) Pam Teeguarden (Czechoslovakia) Martina Navratilova
25 Aug; 1 Sep	US Open; New York City, United States; Grand Slam; Clay – 64S/32D/32X; Singles – Doubles – Mixed doubles	(United States) Chris Evert; 5–7, 6–4, 6–2	(Australia) Evonne Goolagong Cawley	(Czechoslovakia) Martina Navratilova (United Kingdom) Virginia Wade	(Australia) Kerry Melville (Australia) Margaret Court (Japan) Kazuko Sawamatsu (West Germany) Katja Ebbinghaus
25 Aug; 1 Sep	US Open; New York City, United States; Grand Slam; Clay – 64S/32D/32X; Singles – Doubles – Mixed doubles	(Australia) Margaret Court (United Kingdom) Virginia Wade; 7–5, 2–6, 7–6	(United States) Rosie Casals (United States) Billie Jean King	(Czechoslovakia) Martina Navratilova (United Kingdom) Virginia Wade	(Australia) Kerry Melville (Australia) Margaret Court (Japan) Kazuko Sawamatsu (West Germany) Katja Ebbinghaus
25 Aug; 1 Sep	US Open; New York City, United States; Grand Slam; Clay – 64S/32D/32X; Singles – Doubles – Mixed doubles	(United States) Rosie Casals (United States) Dick Stockton; 6–3, 6–7, 6–3	(United States) Billie Jean King (Australia) Fred Stolle	(Czechoslovakia) Martina Navratilova (United Kingdom) Virginia Wade	(Australia) Kerry Melville (Australia) Margaret Court (Japan) Kazuko Sawamatsu (West Germany) Katja Ebbinghaus

=== September ===
Week	Tournament	Champions	Runners-up	Semifinalists	Quarterfinalists
8 Sep	World Invitational Classic; Hilton Head, USA; Non-tour event Clay; Draw	(United States) Chris Evert; 6–1, 6–1	(Australia) Evonne Goolagong Cawley	(United States) Rosie Casals (United Kingdom) Virginia Wade	
15 Sep	Little Mo Classic; Atlanta, United States; Women's International Grand Prix; Hard – $60,000	(United States) Chris Evert; 2–6, 6–2, 6–0	(Czechoslovakia) Martina Navratilova	(France) Françoise Dürr (United Kingdom) Virginia Wade	(South Africa) Brigitte Cuypers (United States) Terry Holladay (Soviet Union) Marina Kroschina (United States) Carrie Meyer
15 Sep	Little Mo Classic; Atlanta, United States; Women's International Grand Prix; Hard – $60,000	(United States) Chris Evert (Czechoslovakia) Martina Navratilova; 6–4, 5–7, 6–2	(France) Françoise Dürr (Netherlands) Betty Stöve	(France) Françoise Dürr (United Kingdom) Virginia Wade	(South Africa) Brigitte Cuypers (United States) Terry Holladay (Soviet Union) Marina Kroschina (United States) Carrie Meyer
22 Sep	Majestic International; Denver, United States; Women's International Grand Prix; Hard (i) – $60,000	(Czechoslovakia) Martina Navratilova; 4–6, 6–4, 6–3	(United States) Carrie Meyer	3rd: (United States) Nancy Gunter; 4th: (United Kingdom) Sue Barker	(France) Françoise Dürr (United States) Rosie Casals (United States) Terry Holladay (Australia) Cynthia Doerner
22 Sep	Majestic International; Denver, United States; Women's International Grand Prix; Hard (i) – $60,000	(France) Françoise Dürr (Netherlands) Betty Stöve; 3–6, 6–1, 7–6	(United States) Rosie Casals (Czechoslovakia) Martina Navratilova	3rd: (United States) Nancy Gunter; 4th: (United Kingdom) Sue Barker	(France) Françoise Dürr (United States) Rosie Casals (United States) Terry Holladay (Australia) Cynthia Doerner
29 Sep	Mission Viejo Tournament; Mission Viejo, United States; Women's International Grand Prix; Hard – $60,000	(United States) Chris Evert; 6–1, 6–3	(Australia) Cynthia Doerner	3rd: (Czechoslovakia) Martina Navratilova; 4th: (Australia) Dianne Fromholtz	(Netherlands) Tine Zwaan (United States) Betty-Ann Stuart (United States) Carrie Meyer (United Kingdom) Sue Barker
29 Sep	Mission Viejo Tournament; Mission Viejo, United States; Women's International Grand Prix; Hard – $60,000	(United States) Chris Evert (Czechoslovakia) Martina Navratilova; 6–3, 7–5	(United States) Gail Glasgow (United States) Betty-Ann Stuart	3rd: (Czechoslovakia) Martina Navratilova; 4th: (Australia) Dianne Fromholtz	(Netherlands) Tine Zwaan (United States) Betty-Ann Stuart (United States) Carrie Meyer (United Kingdom) Sue Barker

=== October ===
Week	Tournament	Champions	Runners-up	Semifinalists	Quarterfinalists
6 Oct	Thunderbird Classic; Phoenix, United States; Women's International Grand Prix; Hard – $60,000	(United States) Nancy Gunter; 4–6, 7–5, 6–4	(United Kingdom) Virginia Wade	3rd: (Czechoslovakia) Martina Navratilova; 4th: (France) Françoise Dürr	(United States) Laura duPont (United States) Valerie Ziegenfuss (United States) Ann Kiyomura (South Africa) Linky Boshoff
6 Oct	Thunderbird Classic; Phoenix, United States; Women's International Grand Prix; Hard – $60,000	(France) Françoise Dürr (Netherlands) Betty Stöve; 6–7, 6–4, 6–0	(United States) Rosie Casals (Czechoslovakia) Martina Navratilova	3rd: (Czechoslovakia) Martina Navratilova; 4th: (France) Françoise Dürr	(United States) Laura duPont (United States) Valerie Ziegenfuss (United States) Ann Kiyomura (South Africa) Linky Boshoff
13 Oct	Barnett Bank Tennis Classic; Orlando, United States; Women's International Grand Prix; Clay (green) – $50,000	(United States) Chris Evert; Walkover	(Czechoslovakia) Martina Navratilova	(United States) Rosie Casals (United States) Kathy Kuykendall	(South Africa) Linky Boshoff (United States) Betsy Nagelsen (United States) Rayni Fox (United States) Donna Ganz
13 Oct	Barnett Bank Tennis Classic; Orlando, United States; Women's International Grand Prix; Clay (green) – $50,000	(United States) Rosie Casals (United States) Wendy Overton; Walkover	(United States) Chris Evert (Czechoslovakia) Martina Navratilova	(United States) Rosie Casals (United States) Kathy Kuykendall	(South Africa) Linky Boshoff (United States) Betsy Nagelsen (United States) Rayni Fox (United States) Donna Ganz
20 Oct	US Indoors; Charlotte, United States; Non-tour event Clay; Draw	(Czechoslovakia) Martina Navratilova; 4–6, 6–2, 7–5	(Australia) Evonne Goolagong Cawley	(Netherlands) Betty Stöve (France) Françoise Dürr	
20 Oct	US Indoors; Charlotte, United States; Non-tour event Clay; Draw	(United States) Rosie Casals (United States) Billie Jean King		(Netherlands) Betty Stöve (France) Françoise Dürr	
27 Oct	Stockholm Open; Stockholm, Sweden; Women's International Grand Prix; Hard (i) – $30,000	(United Kingdom) Virginia Wade; 6–3, 4–6, 7–5	(France) Françoise Dürr	(United States) Rosie Casals (United States) Terry Holladay	(United States) Marcie Louie (Soviet Union) Natasha Chmyreva (Netherlands) Betty Stöve (Sweden) Ingrid Bentzer
27 Oct	Stockholm Open; Stockholm, Sweden; Women's International Grand Prix; Hard (i) – $30,000	(France) Françoise Dürr (Netherlands) Betty Stöve; 6–3, 6–4	(Australia) Evonne Goolagong Cawley (United Kingdom) Virginia Wade	(United States) Rosie Casals (United States) Terry Holladay	(United States) Marcie Louie (Soviet Union) Natasha Chmyreva (Netherlands) Betty Stöve (Sweden) Ingrid Bentzer

=== November ===
Week	Tournament	Champions	Runners-up	Semifinalists	Quarterfinalists
3 Nov	French Indoors; Paris, France; Women's International Grand Prix; Hard (i)	(United Kingdom) Virginia Wade; 6–1, 6–7, 9–7	(United Kingdom) Sue Barker	(United Kingdom) Glynis Coles (Netherlands) Betty Stöve	(Australia) Evonne Goolagong Cawley (United States) Rosie Casals (West Germany) Heidi Eisterlehner (West Germany) Iris Riedel
3 Nov	French Indoors; Paris, France; Women's International Grand Prix; Hard (i)	(France) Françoise Dürr (Netherlands) Betty Stöve; 2–6, 6–0, 6–3	(Australia) Evonne Goolagong Cawley (United Kingdom) Virginia Wade	(United Kingdom) Glynis Coles (Netherlands) Betty Stöve	(Australia) Evonne Goolagong Cawley (United States) Rosie Casals (West Germany) Heidi Eisterlehner (West Germany) Iris Riedel
3 Nov	Japan Open Tennis Championships; Tokyo, Japan; Non-tour event Clay	(Japan) Kazuko Sawamatsu; 6–2, 3–6, 6–1	(United States) Ann Kiyomura	Round robin (Uruguay) Fiorella Bonicelli (Japan) Kiyomi Nomura (United States) Wendy Overton (Japan) Toshiko Sade	
3 Nov	Japan Open Tennis Championships; Tokyo, Japan; Non-tour event Clay	(United States) Ann Kiyomura (Japan) Kazuko Sawamatsu; 6–2, 6–3	(Japan) Kayoko Fukuoka (Japan) Kiyomi Nomura	Round robin (Uruguay) Fiorella Bonicelli (Japan) Kiyomi Nomura (United States) Wendy Overton (Japan) Toshiko Sade	
10 Nov	Dewar Cup; Edinburgh & London, Great Britain; Non-tour event Hard (i)	(United Kingdom) Virginia Wade; 6–3, 6–2	(Australia) Evonne Goolagong Cawley	(Socialist Federal Republic of Yugoslavia) Mima Jaušovec (Czechoslovakia) Renáta Tomanová	(United States) Janice Metcalf (United States) Terry Holladay (United States) Rosie Casals (Netherlands) Betty Stöve
10 Nov	Dewar Cup; Edinburgh & London, Great Britain; Non-tour event Hard (i)	(France) Françoise Dürr (Netherlands) Betty Stöve; 6–4, 7–6	(Australia) Evonne Goolagong Cawley (United Kingdom) Virginia Wade	(Socialist Federal Republic of Yugoslavia) Mima Jaušovec (Czechoslovakia) Renáta Tomanová	(United States) Janice Metcalf (United States) Terry Holladay (United States) Rosie Casals (Netherlands) Betty Stöve
17 Nov	Wightman Cup; Cleveland, United States; Hard (i); Team event	Great Britain 5–2	United States		
24 Nov	South African Open; Johannesburg, South Africa; Non-tour event Hard; Draw	(South Africa) Annette DuPlooy; 6–3, 3–6, 6–4	(South Africa) Brigitte Cuypers	(United States) Kristien Shaw (South Africa) Linky Boshoff	(Australia) Dianne Fromholtz (United States) Janice Metcalf (South Africa) Alison McMillan; N/A

=== December ===
Week	Tournament	Champions	Runners-up	Semifinalists	Quarterfinalists
1 Dec	South Australian Championships; Adelaide, Australia; Non-tour event Grass	(United Kingdom) Sue Barker; 6–2, 6–1	(West Germany) Helga Masthoff	(Australia) Dianne Berkinshaw (Australia) Chris O'Neil	(Australia) Jan Wilton (Sweden) Vivicca Andersson (Sweden) Lotta Stenberg (United Kingdom) Michelle Tyler
1 Dec	South Australian Championships; Adelaide, Australia; Non-tour event Grass	(United Kingdom) Sue Barker (United Kingdom) Michelle Tyler; 7–5, 6–3	(Australia) Kym Ruddell (Australia) Janet Young	(Australia) Dianne Berkinshaw (Australia) Chris O'Neil	(Australia) Jan Wilton (Sweden) Vivicca Andersson (Sweden) Lotta Stenberg (United Kingdom) Michelle Tyler
8 Dec	Dewar Cup; Perth, Australia; Non-tour event Grass	(United Kingdom) Virginia Wade; 6–3, 6–1	(Australia) Evonne Goolagong Cawley		
8 Dec	Dewar Cup; Perth, Australia; Non-tour event Grass	(France) Françoise Dürr (Netherlands) Betty Stöve; 6–4, 7–6	(Australia) Evonne Goolagong Cawley (United Kingdom) Virginia Wade		
15 Dec	Western Australian Championships; Perth, Australia; Non-tour event Grass	(West Germany) Helga Masthoff; 6–2, 3–6, 6–4	(Australia) Lesley Bowrey	(United Kingdom) Michelle Tyler (Australia) Chris Matison	(Belgium) Michele Gurdal (Czechoslovakia) Renáta Tomanová (United States) Kathleen Harter (United Kingdom) Sue Barker
15 Dec	Western Australian Championships; Perth, Australia; Non-tour event Grass	(Australia) Lesley Bowrey (Australia) Chris Matison; 7–6, 6–3	(United Kingdom) Sue Barker (United Kingdom) Michelle Tyler	(United Kingdom) Michelle Tyler (Australia) Chris Matison	(Belgium) Michele Gurdal (Czechoslovakia) Renáta Tomanová (United States) Kathleen Harter (United Kingdom) Sue Barker
15 Dec	New South Wales Open; Sydney, Australia; Women's International Grand Prix; Grass	(Australia) Evonne Goolagong Cawley; 6–2, 6–4	(United Kingdom) Sue Barker	(West Germany) Helga Masthoff (Australia) Wendy Turnbull	(United States) Kathleen Harter (United Kingdom) Michelle Tyler (West Germany) Heidi Eisterlehner (Australia) Chris Matison
15 Dec	New South Wales Open; Sydney, Australia; Women's International Grand Prix; Grass	(Australia) Evonne Goolagong Cawley (Australia) Helen Gourlay; 6–3, 4–6, 6–3	(West Germany) Heidi Eisterlehner (West Germany) Helga Masthoff	(West Germany) Helga Masthoff (Australia) Wendy Turnbull	(United States) Kathleen Harter (United Kingdom) Michelle Tyler (West Germany) Heidi Eisterlehner (Australia) Chris Matison

== Statistical information ==
These tables present the number of singles (S), doubles (D), and mixed doubles (X) titles won by each player and each nation during the 1973 Virginia Slims Circuit. They also include data for the Grand Slam tournaments and the year-end championships. The table is sorted by:

1. total number of titles (a doubles title won by two players representing the same nation counts as only one win for the nation);
2. highest amount of highest category tournaments (for example, having a single Grand Slam gives preference over any kind of combination without a Grand Slam title);
3. a singles > doubles > mixed doubles hierarchy;
4. alphabetical order (by family names for players).

=== Key ===
Grand Slam tournaments
Virginia Slims championships
Virginia Slims Circuit
Women's International Grand Prix
Non-Tour Events

=== Titles won by player ===
Total	Player	S	D	X	S	D	S	D	S	D	S	D	S	D	X
26	Chris Evert (USA)	● ●	●		●		● ● ●	● ● ●	● ● ● ● ● ● ●	● ● ● ●	● ●	●	15	11	0
11	Martina Navratilova (TCH)		●				● ●	● ●	●	● ● ● ●	●		4	7	0
10	Betty Stöve (NED)							● ● ● ● ●		● ● ● ●		●	0	10	0
9	Evonne Goolagong (AUS)	●	●				●	●	●	● ●	●	●	4	5	0
9	Virginia Wade (GBR)		●			●	● ●		● ● ●	●	●		6	3	0
9	Françoise Durr (FRA)							● ● ● ●		● ● ● ●		●	0	9	0
5	Margaret Court (AUS)		●	●		●	●			●			1	3	1
5	Billie Jean King (USA)	●					●	● ● ●					2	3	0
5	Sue Barker (GBR)										● ● ●	● ●	3	2	0
4	Rosie Casals (USA)			●				●		●		●	0	3	1
3	Kazuko Sawamatsu (JPN)		●								●	●	1	2	0
2	Ann Kiyomura (USA)		●									●	0	2	0
2	Fiorella Bonicelli (URU)			●						●			0	1	1
2	Renáta Tomanová (TCH)								●	●			0	2	0
2	Julie Anthony (USA)									● ●			0	2	0
2	Olga Morozova (URS)									●	●		1	1	0
2	Janet Newberry (USA)										●	●	1	1	0
2	Pam Teeguarden (USA)											● ●	0	2	0
1	Peggy Michel (USA)		●										0	1	0
1	Lesley Hunt (AUS)							●					0	1	0
1	Nancy Gunter (USA)								●				1	0	0
1	Marcie Louie (USA)								●				0	1	0
1	Isabel Fernández de Soto (COL)									●			0	1	0
1	Dianne Fromholtz (AUS)									●			0	1	0
1	Helen Gourlay (AUS)									●			0	1	0
1	Wendy Overton (USA)									●			0	1	0
1	Annette DuPlooy (RSA)										●		1	0	0
1	Helga Masthoff (FRG)										●		1	0	0
1	Virginia Ruzici (ROU)										●		1	0	0
1	Lesley Bowrey (AUS)											●	0	1	0
1	Lesley Charles (GBR)											●	0	1	0
1	Sue Mappin (GBR)											●	0	1	0
1	Chris Matison (AUS)											●	0	1	0
1	Kristien Shaw (USA)											●	0	1	0
1	Greer Stevens (RSA)											●	0	1	0
1	Wendy Turnbull (AUS)											●	0	1	0
1	Michelle Tyler (GBR)											●	0	1	0

=== Titles won by nation ===
Total	Nation	S	D	X	S	D	S	D	S	D	S	D	S	D	X
40	United States (USA)	3	3	1	1	0	4	4	9	7	3	5	20	19	1
19	Great Britain (GBR)	0	1	0	0	1	2	5	3	1	3	3	8	11	0
17	Australia (AUS)	1	2	1	0	1	2	2	1	4	1	2	5	11	1
13	Czechoslovakia (TCH)	0	1	0	0	0	2	2	2	5	1	0	5	8	0
10	Netherlands (NED)	0	0	0	0	0	0	5	0	4	0	1	0	10	0
9	France (FRA)	0	0	0	0	0	0	4	0	4	0	1	0	9	0
3	Japan (JPN)	0	1	0	0	0	0	0	0	0	1	1	1	2	0
2	Uruguay (URU)	0	0	1	0	0	0	0	0	1	0	0	0	1	1
2	Soviet Union (URS)	0	0	0	0	0	0	0	0	1	1	0	1	1	0
2	South Africa (RSA)	0	0	0	0	0	0	0	0	0	1	1	1	1	0
1	Colombia (COL)	0	0	0	0	0	0	0	0	1	0	0	0	1	0
1	Romania (ROU)	0	0	0	0	0	0	0	0	0	1	0	1	0	0
1	West Germany (FRG)	0	0	0	0	0	0	0	0	0	1	0	1	0	0

== Rankings ==
Below are the 1975 WTA year-end rankings (November 4, 1975) Singles competition:

Singles Year-end Ranking
No	Player Name
1	Chris Evert (USA)
2	Virginia Wade (GBR)
3	Martina Navratilova (TCH)
4	Billie Jean King (USA)
5	Evonne Goolagong Cawley (AUS)
6	Margaret Court (AUS)
7	Olga Morozova (USSR)
8	Nancy Gunter (USA)
9	Françoise Dürr (FRA)
10	Kerry Melville (AUS)
11	Julie Heldman (USA)
12	Rosie Casals (USA)
13	Wendy Overton (USA)
14	Marcie Louie (USA)
15	Carrie Meyer (USA)
16	Kazuko Sawamatsu (JPN)
17	Mona Schallau (USA)
18	Linky Boshoff (RSA)
19	Sue Barker (GBR)
20	Dianne Fromholtz (AUS)

== See also ==
- 1975 World Team Tennis season
- 1975 Men's Grand Prix circuit
