= 1984 Maybelline Classic =

- Date: September 17–23
- Edition: 5th
- Draw: 32S / 16D
- Prize money: $150,000
- Surface: Hard / outdoor
- Location: Fort Lauderdale, Florida, U.S.

Champions

Singles
- (United States) Martina Navratilova

Doubles
- (United States) Martina Navratilova / (Australia) Elizabeth Smylie
- Maybelline Classic

The 1984 Maybelline Classic was a tennis tournament played on outdoor hard courts in Fort Lauderdale, Florida in the United States that was part of the 1984 Virginia Slims World Championship Series. The tournament was held from September 17 through September 23, 1984. First-seeded Martina Navratilova won the singles title.

== Finals ==
=== Singles ===
(United States) Martina Navratilova defeated (United States) Michelle Torres 6–1, 6–0

- It was Navratilova's 11th singles title of the year and the 97th of her career.

=== Doubles ===
(United States) Martina Navratilova / (Australia) Elizabeth Smylie defeated (United States) Barbara Potter / (United States) Sharon Walsh 2–6, 6–2, 6–3

- It was Navratilova's 19th title of the year and the 198th of her career. It was Smylie's 2nd title of the year and the 7th of her career.
