= 1973 Lady Gotham Classic =

- Date: March 26 – April 1
- Edition: 3rd
- Draw: 16S
- Prize money: $30,000
- Surface: Carpet / indoor
- Location: New York, United States
- Venue: Felt Forum
- Attendance: 10,536

Champions

Singles
- (United States) Chris Evert
| ← 1972 · | Lady Gotham Classic | · 1975 → |

The 1973 Lady Gotham Classic was a women's tennis tournament played on indoor carpet courts at the Felt Forum in New York City, United States. The event was part of the USLTA Circuit of the 1973 Virginia Slims WTA Tour and was held from March 28 through April 1, 1973. Only a singles competition was played. Second-seeded Chris Evert won the title and earned $8,000 first-prize money.

== Finals ==
=== Singles ===
(United States) Chris Evert defeated (Germany) Katja Ebbinghaus 6–0, 6–4

- It was Evert's 3rd singles title of the year and the 14th of her career.
