= 1973 First Federal of Sarasota Open =

- Date: April 5–8
- Edition: 1st
- Category: Grand Prix (USLTA)
- Draw: 16S / 8D
- Prize money: $20,000
- Surface: Clay (green) / indoor
- Location: Sarasota, Florida, U.S.
- Venue: Bath & Racquet Club

Champions

Singles
- (United States) Chris Evert

Doubles
- (United States) Patti Hogan / (United States) Sharon Walsh
Virginia Slims of Sarasota	· 1974 →

The 1973 First Federal of Sarasota Open, also known as the Virginia Slims of Sarasota, was a women's tennis tournament played on outdoor green clay courts at the Bath & Racquet Club in Sarasota, Florida in the United States that was part of the USLTA circuit which was in turn part of the 1973 Commercial Union Grand Prix circuit. It was the inaugural edition of the tournament and was held from April 5 through April 8, 1973. First-seeded Chris Evert won the singles title and earned $5,000 first-prize money.

== Finals ==
=== Singles ===
(United States) Chris Evert defeated (Australia) Evonne Goolagong 6–3, 6–2

- It was Evert's 4th singles title of the year and the 15th of her career.

=== Doubles ===
(United States) Patti Hogan / (United States) Sharon Walsh defeated (Czechoslovakia) Martina Navratilova / (Czechoslovakia) Marie Neumannová 4–6, 6–0, 6–3

== Prize money ==
Event	W	F	3rd	4th	QF	Round of 16
Singles	$5,000	$2,500	$1,750	$1,250	$600	$300
