= 1984 Maybelline Classic – Doubles =

Doubles
- 1984 Maybelline Classic

Final
- Champions: (United States) Martina Navratilova (Australia) Elizabeth Smylie
- Runners-up: (United States) Barbara Potter (United States) Sharon Walsh
- Score: 2–6, 6–2, 6–3

Details
- Draw: 16
- Seeds: 4

Events
Singles	Doubles
- Maybelline Classic

Bonnie Gadusek and Wendy White were the defending champions, but Gadusek did not compete this year. White teamed up with Mary Lou Daniels and lost in the quarterfinals to Rosalyn Fairbank and Kimberly Shaefer.

Martina Navratilova and Elizabeth Smylie won the title by defeating Barbara Potter and Sharon Walsh 2–6, 6–2, 6–3 in the final.

== Seeds ==
1. (United States) Barbara Potter / (United States) Sharon Walsh (final)
2. (United States) Martina Navratilova / (Australia) Elizabeth Smylie (champions)
3. (United States) Elise Burgin / (France) Catherine Tanvier (semifinals)
4. (South Africa) Rosalyn Fairbank / (United States) Kimberly Shaefer (semifinals)

== Draw ==
Key

- Q = Qualifier
- WC = Wild card
- LL = Lucky loser
- Alt = Alternate
- ITF = ITF entry
- PR = Protected ranking
- SR = Special ranking
- SE = Special exempt
- JE = Junior exempt
- JR = Junior Accelerator Programme entrant
- CO = College Accelerator Programme entrant
- NG = Next Gen Accelerator Program entrant
- w/o = Walkover
- r = Retired
- d = Defaulted

=== Draw ===
First round
1	(United States) B Potter (United States) S Walsh	6	6
(Peru) L Gildemeister (United States) K Rinaldi	0	3
(Australia) A Minter (Australia) E Minter	6	6
(United States) P Barg (United States) T Phelps	3	1
4	(South Africa) R Fairbank (United States) K Shaefer	w/o
(United States) C Benjamin (United States) V Nelson
(United States) R Blount (United States) J Newberry	1	6	2
(United States) ML Daniels (United States) W White	6	4	6
(United States) G Fernández (Australia) S Leo	6	6
(United States) K Cummings (United States) M Quinlan	2	0
(United States) S Collins (United States) P Teeguarden	6	4
3	(United States) E Burgin (France) C Tanvier	7	6
(United States) P Louie (United States) K Sands	6	6
(United States) J Klitch (South Africa) R Uys	4	3
(Canada) J Hetherington (Canada) H Pelletier	2	1
2	(United States) M Navratilova (Australia) E Smylie	6	6

Quarterfinals
1	(United States) B Potter (United States) S Walsh	6	6
(Australia) A Minter (Australia) E Minter	2	2
4	(South Africa) R Fairbank (United States) K Shaefer	6	7
(United States) ML Daniels (United States) W White	3	5
(United States) G Fernández (Australia) S Leo	6	6	4
3	(United States) E Burgin (France) C Tanvier	2	7	6
(United States) P Louie (United States) K Sands	3	1
2	(United States) M Navratilova (Australia) E Smylie	6	6

Semifinals
1	(United States) B Potter (United States) S Walsh	6	6
4	(South Africa) R Fairbank (United States) K Shaefer	4	2
3	(United States) E Burgin (France) C Tanvier	6	1
2	(United States) M Navratilova (Australia) E Smylie	7	6

Final
1	(United States) B Potter (United States) S Walsh	6	2	3
2	(United States) M Navratilova (Australia) E Smylie	2	6	6
