= 1984 Maybelline Classic – Singles =

Singles
- 1984 Maybelline Classic

Final
- Champion: (United States) Martina Navratilova
- Runner-up: (United States) Michelle Torres
- Score: 6–1, 6–0

Details
- Draw: 32
- Seeds: 8

Events
Singles	Doubles
- Maybelline Classic

Chris Evert-Lloyd was the four-time defending champion, but chose not to compete this year.

Martina Navratilova won the title by defeating Michelle Torres 6–1, 6–0 in the final.

== Seeds ==
1. (United States) Martina Navratilova (champion)
2. (United States) Lisa Bonder (second round)
3. (United States) Bonnie Gadusek (quarterfinals)
4. (Australia) Wendy Turnbull (semifinals)
5. (United States) Barbara Potter (second round)
6. (Peru) Laura Gildemeister (second round)
7. (France) Catherine Tanvier (quarterfinals)
8. (United States) Kathy Rinaldi (semifinals)

== Draw ==
Key

- Q = Qualifier
- WC = Wild card
- LL = Lucky loser
- Alt = Alternate
- ITF = ITF entry
- PR = Protected ranking
- SR = Special ranking
- SE = Special exempt
- JE = Junior exempt
- JR = Junior Accelerator Programme entrant
- CO = College Accelerator Programme entrant
- NG = Next Gen Accelerator Program entrant
- w/o = Walkover
- r = Retired
- d = Defaulted

=== Finals ===
Semifinals
1	(United States) Martina Navratilova	6	6
4	(Australia) Wendy Turnbull	3	2
8	(United States) Kathy Rinaldi	4	3
(United States) Michelle Torres	6	6

Final
1	(United States) Martina Navratilova	6	6
(United States) Michelle Torres	1	0

=== Top half ===
First round
1	(United States) M Navratilova	6	6
(United States) M Brown	1	2
(South Africa) R Fairbank	6	7
(United States) K Sands	4	5
(United States) E Burgin	6	4	7
(United States) W White	4	6	6
(Australia) S Leo	5	2
6	(Peru) L Gildemeister	7	6
4	(Australia) W Turnbull	7	6
(United States) C Benjamin	6	3
(United States) P Louie	6	6
(Australia) A Minter	4	2
(South Africa) R Uys	1	6	6
(United States) MJ Fernandez	6	2	4
(United States) K Cummings	2	3
7	(France) C Tanvier	6	6

Second round
1	(United States) M Navratilova	6	6
(South Africa) R Fairbank	1	2
(United States) E Burgin	4	6	6
6	(Peru) L Gildemeister	6	4	1
4	(Australia) W Turnbull	6	6
(United States) P Louie	2	3
(South Africa) R Uys	4	6	1
7	(France) C Tanvier	6	4	6

Quarterfinals
1	(United States) M Navratilova	6	6
(United States) E Burgin	3	2
4	(Australia) W Turnbull	6	6
7	(France) C Tanvier	0	1

Semifinals
1	(United States) M Navratilova	6	6
4	(Australia) W Turnbull	3	2

=== Bottom half ===
First round
8	(United States) K Rinaldi	7	5	6
(United States) ML Daniels	6	7	3
(Australia) E Minter	6	6
(United States) V Nelson-Dunbar	4	2
(United States) S Collins	7	7
(United States) G Fernández	5	5
(United States) J Klitch	2	4
3	(United States) B Gadusek	6	6
5	(United States) B Potter	6	7
(United States) M Quinlan	2	5
(United States) S Walsh	4	2
(United States) T Phelps	6	6
(United States) M Torres	6	6
(United States) K Shaefer	1	2
(Australia) E Smylie	7	1	3
2	(United States) L Bonder	5	6	6

Second round
8	(United States) K Rinaldi	6	6
(Australia) E Minter	3	2
(United States) S Collins	3	4
3	(United States) B Gadusek	6	6
5	(United States) B Potter	6	6	2
(United States) T Phelps	2	7	6
(United States) M Torres	6	7
2	(United States) L Bonder	4	6

Quarterfinals
8	(United States) K Rinaldi	6	6
3	(United States) B Gadusek	3	2
(United States) T Phelps	7	4	2
(United States) M Torres	5	6	6

Semifinals
8	(United States) K Rinaldi	4	3
(United States) M Torres	6	6
