= 1975 Virginia Slims of Sarasota =

- Date: January 13–19
- Edition: 3rd
- Category: Virginia Slims circuit
- Draw: 32S / 16D
- Prize money: $75,000
- Surface: Carpet (Sporteze) / indoor
- Location: Sarasota, Florida, U.S.
- Venue: Robarts Sports Arena

Champions

Singles
- (United States) Billie Jean King

Doubles
- (United States) Chris Evert / (United States) Billie Jean King
- Virginia Slims of Sarasota

The 1975 Virginia Slims of Sarasota was a women's tennis tournament played on indoor carpet courts at the Robarts Sports Arena in Sarasota, Florida in the United States that was part of the 1975 Virginia Slims World Championship Series. It was the third edition of the tournament and was held from January 13 through January 19, 1975. Second-seeded Billie Jean King won the singles title and earned $15,000 first-prize money.

== Finals ==
=== Singles ===
(United States) Billie Jean King defeated (United States) Chris Evert 6–2, 6–3

- It was King's 1st singles title of the year and the 113th of her career.

=== Doubles ===
(United States) Chris Evert / (United States) Billie Jean King defeated (Netherlands) Betty Stöve / (United Kingdom) Virginia Wade 6–4, 6–2

== Prize money ==
Event	W	F	3rd	4th	QF	Round of 16	Round of 32
Singles	$15,000	$8,500	$4,600	$3,800	$2,100	$1,100	$550
