= 1986 Chrysler-Plymouth Tournament of Champions =

- Date: March 31 – April 6
- Edition: 4th
- Draw: 22S
- Prize money: $150,000
- Surface: Clay / outdoors
- Location: Marco Island, Florida, U.S.

Champions

Singles
- (United States) Chris Evert

Doubles
- (United States) Martina Navratilova (Hungary) Andrea Temesvári
← 1985 ·	Tournament of Champions

The 1986 WTA Tournament of Championships was a women's tennis tournament played on outdoor clay courts in Marco Island, Florida in the United States. It was part of the 1986 WTA Tour and was played from March 31 through April 6, 1986. Chris Evert won the singles title. The doubles competition was played as a round robin exhibition. Martina Navratilova, who had won all previous six singles titles at the event, elected to compete only in the doubles competition.

== Finals ==
=== Singles ===
(United States) Chris Evert defeated (West Germany) Claudia Kohde-Kilsch 6–2, 6–4

- It was Evert's 4th singles title of the year and the 146th of her career.

=== Doubles ===
(United States) Martina Navratilova / (Hungary) Andrea Temesvári defeated (United States) Elise Burgin / (United States) Kathy Jordan 7–5, 6–2
