= Chris Evert career statistics =

Statistics of professional tennis player

Career finals
Discipline	Type	Won	Lost	Total	WR
Singles	Grand Slam tournaments	18	16	34	.53
Singles	Summer Olympics	–	–	–	–
Singles	Year-end championships	4	4	8	.50
Singles	WTA Premier Mandatory*	–	–	–	–
Singles	WTA Tour	135	53	188	.72
Singles	Total	157	73	230	.68
Doubles	Grand Slam tournaments	3	1	4	.75
Doubles	Summer Olympics	–	–	–	–
Doubles	Year-end championships	–	–	–	–
Doubles	WTA Premier Mandatory*	–	–	–	–
Doubles	WTA Tour	29	25	54	.54
Doubles	Total	32	26	58	.55
Mixed doubles	Grand Slam tournaments	0	1	1	.00
Mixed doubles	Total	0	1	1	.00
Total		189	100	289	.65
1) WR=winning rate 2) * formerly known as "Tier I" tournaments.

This is a list of the main career statistics of former professional tennis player Chris Evert.

== Significant finals ==
=== Grand Slam finals ===
==== Singles: 34 finals (18 titles, 16 runners-up) ====
Evert played in a total of 56 grand slams in her career. From her debut as a 16-year-old at the 1971 US Open, she reached the semifinals or better in her first 34 grand slam events. Overall, she reached 54 quarterfinals, 52 semifinals, and 34 finals. Her only 2 quarterfinal losses were both at the US Open, in 1987 to Lori McNeil and in 1989, when the US Open served as her farewell from tournament play, to Zina Garrison. She lost before the quarterfinals 2 times, both in the third round, at the 1983 Wimbledon where she lost to Kathy Jordan and at the 1988 French Open where she lost to Arantxa Sánchez Vicario. Her 299 grand slam singles match wins is 3rd best in the Open Era.

Result	Year	Championship	Surface	Opponent	Score
Loss	1973	French Open	Clay	(Australia) Margaret Court	7–6^{(7–5)}, 6–7^{(6–8)}, 4–6
Loss	1973	Wimbledon	Grass	(United States) Billie Jean King	0–6, 5–7
Loss	1974	Australian Open	Grass	(Australia) Evonne Goolagong	6–7^{(5–7)}, 6–4, 0–6
Win	1974	French Open	Clay	(Soviet Union) Olga Morozova	6–1, 6–2
Win	1974	Wimbledon	Grass	(Soviet Union) Olga Morozova	6–0, 6–4
Win	1975	French Open (2)	Clay	(Czechoslovakia) Martina Navratilova	2–6, 6–2, 6–1
Win	1975	US Open	Clay	(Australia) Evonne Goolagong	5–7, 6–4, 6–2
Win	1976	Wimbledon (2)	Grass	(Australia) Evonne Goolagong	6–3, 4–6, 8–6
Win	1976	US Open (2)	Clay	(Australia) Evonne Goolagong	6–3, 6–0
Win	1977	US Open (3)	Clay	(Australia) Wendy Turnbull	7–6^{(7–3)}, 6–2
Loss	1978	Wimbledon (2)	Grass	(United States) Martina Navratilova	6–2, 4–6, 5–7
Win	1978	US Open (4)	Hard	(United States) Pam Shriver	7–5, 6–4
Win	1979	French Open (3)	Clay	(Australia) Wendy Turnbull	6–2, 6–0
Loss	1979	Wimbledon (3)	Grass	(United States) Martina Navratilova	4–6, 4–6
Loss	1979	US Open	Hard	(United States) Tracy Austin	4–6, 3–6
Win	1980	French Open (4)	Clay	(Romania) Virginia Ruzici	6–0, 6–3
Loss	1980	Wimbledon (4)	Grass	(Australia) Evonne Goolagong	1–6, 6–7^{(4–7)}
Win	1980	US Open (5)	Hard	(Czechoslovakia) Hana Mandlíková	5–7, 6–1, 6–1
Win	1981	Wimbledon (3)	Grass	(Czechoslovakia) Hana Mandlíková	6–2, 6–2
Loss	1981	Australian Open (2)	Grass	(United States) Martina Navratilova	7–6^{(7–4)}, 4–6, 5–7
Loss	1982	Wimbledon (5)	Grass	(United States) Martina Navratilova	1–6, 6–3, 2–6
Win	1982	US Open (6)	Hard	(Czechoslovakia) Hana Mandlíková	6–3, 6–1
Win	1982	Australian Open	Grass	(United States) Martina Navratilova	6–3, 2–6, 6–3
Win	1983	French Open (5)	Clay	(Socialist Federal Republic of Yugoslavia) Mima Jaušovec	6–1, 6–2
Loss	1983	US Open (2)	Hard	(United States) Martina Navratilova	1–6, 3–6
Loss	1984	French Open (2)	Clay	(United States) Martina Navratilova	3–6, 1–6
Loss	1984	Wimbledon (6)	Grass	(United States) Martina Navratilova	6–7^{(5–7)}, 2–6
Loss	1984	US Open (3)	Hard	(United States) Martina Navratilova	6–4, 4–6, 4–6
Win	1984	Australian Open (2)	Grass	(Czechoslovakia) Helena Suková	6–7^{(4–7)}, 6–1, 6–3
Win	1985	French Open (6)	Clay	(United States) Martina Navratilova	6–3, 6–7^{(4–7)}, 7–5
Loss	1985	Wimbledon (7)	Grass	(United States) Martina Navratilova	6–4, 3–6, 2–6
Loss	1985	Australian Open (3)	Grass	(United States) Martina Navratilova	2–6, 6–4, 2–6
Win	1986	French Open (7)	Clay	(United States) Martina Navratilova	2–6, 6–3, 6–3
Loss	1988	Australian Open (4)	Hard	(West Germany) Steffi Graf	1–6, 6–7^{(3–7)}

==== Doubles: 4 finals (3 titles, 1 runner-up) ====
Result	Year	Championship	Surface	Partner	Opponents	Score
Win	1974	French Open	Clay	(Soviet Union) Olga Morozova	(France) Gail Lovera (West Germany) Katja Ebbinghaus	6–4, 2–6, 6–1
Win	1975	French Open (2)	Clay	(Czechoslovakia) Martina Navratilova	(United States) Julie Anthony (Soviet Union) Olga Morozova	6–3, 6–2
Win	1976	Wimbledon	Grass	(United States) Martina Navratilova	(United States) Billie Jean King (Netherlands) Betty Stöve	6–1, 3–6, 7–5
Loss	1988	Australian Open	Hard	(Australia) Wendy Turnbull	(United States) Martina Navratilova (United States) Pam Shriver	0–6, 5–7

==== Mixed doubles: 1 final (1 runner-up) ====
Result	Year	Championship	Surface	Partner	Opponents	Score
Loss	1974	US Open	Grass	(United States) Jimmy Connors	(United States) Pam Teeguarden (Australia) Geoff Masters	1–6, 6–7

=== Year-end championships finals ===
==== Singles: 8 (4 titles, 4 runners-up) ====
Result	Year	Championship	Surface	Opponent	Score
Win	1972	Boca Raton, US	Clay	(Australia) Kerry Melville	7–5, 6–4
Win	1973	Boca Raton, US (2)	Clay	(United States) Nancy Richey	6–3, 6–3
Loss	1974	Los Angeles, US	Carpet	(Australia) Evonne Goolagong	3–6, 4–6
Win	1975	Los Angeles, US (3)	Carpet	(Czechoslovakia) Martina Navratilova	6–4, 6–2
Loss	1976	Los Angeles, US (2)	Carpet	(Australia) Evonne Goolagong	3–6, 7–5, 3–6
Win	1977	New York City, US (4)	Carpet	(United Kingdom) Sue Barker	2–6, 6–1, 6–1
Loss	1983	New York City, US (3)	Carpet	(United States) Martina Navratilova	2–6, 0–6
Loss	1984	New York City, US (4)	Carpet	(United States) Martina Navratilova	3–6, 5–7, 1–6

== Grand Slam singles tournament timeline ==
Key
W	F	SF	QF	#R	RR	Q#	DNQ	A	NH

(W) winner; (F) finalist; (SF) semifinalist; (QF) quarterfinalist; (#R) rounds 4, 3, 2, 1; (RR) round-robin stage; (Q#) qualification round; (DNQ) did not qualify; (A) absent; (NH) not held; (SR) strike rate (events won / competed); (W–L) win–loss record.

Tournament	1971	1972	1973	1974	1975	1976	1977		1978	1979	1980	1981	1982	1983	1984	1985	1986	1987	1988	1989	SR	W–L
Australian Open	A	A	A	F	A	A	A	A	A	A	A	F	W	A	W	F	NH	A	F	A	2 / 6	30–4
French Open	A	A	F	W	W	A	A		A	W	W	SF	SF	W	F	W	W	SF	3R	A	7 / 13	72–6
Wimbledon	A	SF	F	W	SF	W	SF		F	F	F	W	F	3R	F	F	SF	SF	SF	SF	3 / 18	96–15
US Open	SF	SF	SF	SF	W	W	W		W	F	W	SF	W	F	F	SF	SF	QF	SF	QF	6 / 19	101–12
Win-loss	4-1	9–2	15–3	20–2	17–1	13–0	12–1		11–1	18–2	18–1	21–3	21–2	15–2	24–3	23–3	17–2	14–3	18–3	9–2		299–37
Year SR	0 / 1	0 / 2	0 / 3	2 / 4	2 / 3	2 / 2	1 / 2		1 / 2	1 / 3	2 / 3	1 / 4	2 / 4	1 / 3	1 / 4	1 / 4	1 / 3	0 / 3	0 / 4	0 / 2	18 / 56	
Year-end ranking		3	3	1	1	1	1		2	2	1	1	2	2	2	2	2	3	3	10 ^{[A]}		

Notes:

- The Australian Open was held twice in 1977, in January and December.
- ^{[A]} Evert retired in September 1989 after playing in the U.S Open, at which time she was ranked world No.4.

== WTA singles finals ==
=== Titles: (157) ===
Legend (singles) Grand Slam Titles (18) WTA Championships (4)	Titles by surface Hard (35) Clay (70) Grass (17) Carpet (35)

No.	Date	Tournament	Surface	Opponent	Score
1.	Jan 1971	Fort Lauderdale Invitational, U.S.	Clay	(United States) Laurie Fleming	6–2, 6–1
2.	Apr 1971	Virginia Slims Masters, U.S.	Clay	(United States) Julie Heldman	6–1, 6–2
3.	Apr 1971	United States National Bank Open, U.S.	Clay	(United States) Laura DuPont	6–2, 6–0
4.	May 1971	Tulsa Invitation, U.S.	Clay	(United States) Mary Ann Curtis	6–0, 6–3
5.	Aug 1971	Columbus, U.S.	Clay	(United States) Jeanne Evert	6–2, 6–3
6.	Aug 1971	Birmingham, U.S.	Clay	(United States) Jeanne Evert	6–1, 6–0
7.	Aug 1971	Eastern Grass Court Championships, U.S.	Grass	(Australia) Helen Gourlay	6–4, 6–0
8.	Jan 1972	Virginia Slims of Fort Lauderdale, U.S.	Clay	(United States) Billie Jean King	6–1, 6–0
9.	Jun 1972	Rothman's Queens Club, England	Grass	(Australia) Karen Krantzcke	6–4, 6–0
10.	Aug 1972	U.S. Clay Court Championships, U.S.	Clay	(Australia) Evonne Goolagong	7–6, 6–1
11.	Oct 1972	Virginia Slims Championships, U.S.	Clay	(Australia) Kerry Melville	7–5, 6–4
12.	Feb 1973	Fort Lauderdale Open, U.S.	Clay	(United Kingdom) Virginia Wade	6–1, 6–2
13.	Mar 1973	Akron Open, U.S.	Carpet (i)	(Soviet Union) Olga Morozova	6–3, 6–4
14.	Mar 1973	Lady Gotham Open, U.S.	Hard	(West Germany) Katja Ebbinghaus	6–0, 6–4
15.	Apr 1973	First Federal of Sarasota Open, U.S.	Clay	(Australia) Evonne Goolagong	6–3, 6–2
16.	Apr 1973	Miami Beach Open, U.S.	Clay	(Australia) Evonne Goolagong	3–6, 6–3, 6–2
17.	Apr 1973	St. Petersburg Masters Invitation, U.S.	Clay	(Australia) Evonne Goolagong	6–2, 0–6, 6–4
18.	Jul 1973	Marie O. Clarke Memorial, U.S.	Hard	(United States) Linda Tuero	6–0, 6–0
19.	Jul 1973	Atlantic City Open, U.S.	Clay	(United States) Marita Redondo	6–2, 7–5
20.	Aug 1973	U.S. Clay Court Championships, U.S.	Clay	(United Kingdom) Veronica Burton	6–4, 6–3
21.	Sep 1973	Virginia Slims of Columbus, U.S.	Clay	(Australia) Margaret Court	walkover
22.	Oct 1973	Virginia Slims Championships, U.S.	Clay	(United States) Nancy Richey	6–3, 6–3
23.	Nov 1973	South African Championships, South Africa	Hard	(Australia) Evonne Goolagong	6–3, 6–3
24.	Jan 1974	Virginia Slims of Mission Viejo, U.S.	Hard	(United States) Billie Jean King	6–3, 6–1
25.	Feb 1974	S&H Tennis Classic, U.S.	Clay	(Australia) Kerry Melville	walkover
26.	Mar 1974	Maureen Connolly Brinker Championships, U.S.	Carpet (i)	(United Kingdom) Virginia Wade	7–5, 6–2
27.	Apr 1974	First Federal of Sarasota Classic, U.S.	Clay	(Australia) Evonne Goolagong	6–4, 6–0
28.	Apr 1974	Barnett Bank Masters, U.S.	Clay	(Australia) Kerry Melville	6–0, 6–1
29.	Apr 1974	Family Circle Cup, U.S.	Clay	(Australia) Kerry Melville	6–1, 6–3
30.	May 1974	Italian Open, Italy	Clay	(Czechoslovakia) Martina Navratilova	6–3, 6–3
31.	Jun 1974	French Open, France	Clay	(Soviet Union) Olga Morozova	6–1, 6–2
32.	Jun 1974	John Player Championships, England	Grass	(United Kingdom) Virginia Wade	7–5, 6–4
33.	Jun 1974	Wimbledon Championships, England	Grass	(Soviet Union) Olga Morozova	6–0, 6–4
34.	Aug 1974	U.S. Clay Court Championships, U.S.	Clay	(France) Gail Chanfreau	6–0, 6–0
35.	Aug 1974	Rothmans Canadian Open, Canada	Hard	(United States) Julie Heldman	6–0, 6–3
36.	Aug 1974	Virginia Slims of Newport, U.S.	Grass	(United States) Betsy Nagelsen	6–4, 6–3
37.	Sep 1974	Virginia Slims of Houston, U.S.	Carpet (i)	(United Kingdom) Virginia Wade	6–3, 5–7, 6–1
38.	Oct 1974	World Invitational, Hilton Head, U.S.	Clay	(United Kingdom) Virginia Wade	6–1, 6–3
39.	Nov 1974	Tokyo Gunze Classic, Japan	Carpet (i)	(United States) Rosie Casals	6–0, 6–2
40.	Jan 1975	Virginia Slims of San Francisco, U.S.	Hard (i)	(United States) Billie Jean King	6–1, 6–1
41.	Feb 1975	Virginia Slims of Akron, U.S.	Carpet (i)	(Australia) Margaret Court	6–4, 3–6, 6–3
42.	Mar 1975	Virginia Slims of Houston, U.S.	Carpet (i)	(Australia) Margaret Court	6–3, 6–2
43.	Mar 1975	Virginia Slims Championships, U.S.	Carpet (i)	(Czechoslovakia) Martina Navratilova	6–4, 6–2
44.	Apr 1975	Four Woman L'Eggs World Series, U.S.	Hard	(Czechoslovakia) Martina Navratilova	4–6, 6–3, 7–6^{(5–2)}
45.	Apr 1975	Family Circle Cup, U.S.	Clay	(Czechoslovakia) Martina Navratilova	7–5, 6–4
46.	May 1975	Italian Open, Italy	Clay	(Czechoslovakia) Martina Navratilova	6–1, 6–0
47.	Jun 1975	French Open, France	Clay	(Czechoslovakia) Martina Navratilova	2–6, 6–2, 6–1
48.	Aug 1975	U.S. Clay Court Championships, U.S.	Clay	(Australia) Dianne Fromholtz	6–3, 6–4
49.	Aug 1975	Medi-Quik Classic, U.S.	Clay	(United Kingdom) Virginia Wade	6–0, 6–1
50.	Aug 1975	US Open, U.S.	Clay	(Australia) Evonne Goolagong	5–7, 6–4, 6–2
51.	Sep 1975	World Invitanional Classic, U.S.	Clay	(Australia) Evonne Goolagong	6–1, 6–1
52.	Sep 1975	Little Mo Classic, U.S.	Hard	(Czechoslovakia) Martina Navratilova	2–6, 6–2, 6–0
53.	Sep 1975	Virginia Slims of Mission Viejo, U.S.	Hard	(Australia) Cynthia Doerner	6–1, 6–3
54.	Oct 1975	Barnett Bank Tennis Classic, U.S.	Hard	(Czechoslovakia) Martina Navratilova	walkover
55.	Nov 1975	Tokyo Gunze Classic, Japan	Carpet (i)	(France) Françoise Durr	6–2, 6–1
56.	Jan 1976	L‟Eggs World Series, U.S.	Hard	(Australia) Evonne Goolagong	6–3, 7–6
57.	Jan 1976	Virginia Slims of Washington, U.S.	Hard	(United Kingdom) Virginia Wade	6–2, 6–1
58.	Feb 1976	Virginia Slims of Detroit, U.S.	Carpet (i)	(United States) Rosie Casals	6–4, 6–2
59.	Feb 1976	Virginia Slims of Sarasota, U.S.	Carpet (i)	(Australia) Evonne Goolagong	6–0, 6–3
60.	Mar 1976	Virginia Slims of San Francisco, U.S.	Carpet (i)	(Australia) Evonne Goolagong	7–5, 7–6^{(5–2)}
61.	Apr 1976	Family Circle Cup, U.S.	Clay	(Australia) Kerry Melville	7–5, 6–4
62.	Jun 1976	Colgate International, Great Britain	Grass	(United Kingdom) Virginia Wade	8–6, 6–3
63.	Jun 1976	Wimbledon Championships, Great Britain	Grass	(Australia) Evonne Goolagong	6–3, 4–6, 8–6
64.	Aug 1976	US Open, U.S.	Clay	(Australia) Evonne Goolagong	6–3, 6–0
65.	Oct 1976	Thunderbird Classic, U.S.	Hard	(Australia) Dianne Fromholtz	6–1, 7–5
66.	Oct 1976	Colgate Inaugural, U.S.	Hard	(France) Françoise Dürr	6–1, 6–2
67.	Nov 1976	Gunze World Tennis, Japan	Hard (i)	(United Kingdom) Sue Barker	6–2, 7–6
68.	Jan 1977	Virginia Slims of Hollywood, U.S.	Carpet (i)	(Australia) Margaret Court	6–3, 6–4
69.	Jan 1977	Virginia Slims of Seattle, U.S.	Carpet (i)	(United States) Martina Navratilova	6–2, 6–4
70.	Feb 1977	Virginia Slims of Chicago, U.S.	Carpet (i)	(Australia) Margaret Court	6–1, 6–3
71.	Feb 1977	Virginia Slims of Los Angeles, U.S.	Carpet (i)	(United States) Martina Navratilova	6–2, 2–6, 6–1
72.	Mar 1977	Virginia Slims of Philadelphia, U.S.	Carpet (i)	(United States) Martina Navratilova	6–4, 4–6, 6–3
73.	Mar 1977	Virginia Slims Championships, U.S.	Carpet (i)	(United Kingdom) Sue Barker	2–6, 6–1, 6–1
74.	Mar 1977	Family Circle Cup, U.S.	Clay	(United States) Billie Jean King	6–1, 6–0
75.	Apr 1977	L'EGGS World Series of Tennis Tucson, U.S.	Hard	(United States) Martina Navratilova	6–3, 7–6
76.	Aug 1977	US Open, U.S.	Clay	(Australia) Wendy Turnbull	7–6, 6–2
77.	Oct 1977	Wyler's Classic, U.S.	Carpet (i)	(Australia) Dianne Fromholtz	6–3, 6–2
78.	Oct 1977	Colgate Series Championships, U.S.	Hard	(United States) Billie Jean King	6–2, 6–2
79.	Mar 1978	Virginia Slims of Philadelphia, U.S.	Carpet (i)	(United States) Billie Jean King	6–0, 6–4
80.	Apr 1978	Family Circle Cup, Hilton Head, U.S.	Clay	(Australia) Kerry Melville	6–2, 6–0
81.	Aug 1978	US Open, New York, U.S.	Hard	(United States) Pam Shriver	7–5, 6–4
82.	Sep 1978	Wyler's Classic, U.S.	Carpet (i)	(United States) Martina Navratilova	7–6^{(7–3)}, 0–6, 6–3
83.	Oct 1978	US Indoor Championships, Minneapolis, U.S.	Carpet (i)	(United Kingdom) Virginia Wade	6–7, 6–2, 6–4
84.	Nov 1978	Colgate Series Championships, U.S.	Hard	(United States) Martina Navratilova	6–3, 6–3
85.	Dec 1978	Emeron Cup, Japan	Grass	(United States) Martina Navratilova	7–5, 6–2
86.	Feb 1979	Virginia Slims of Seattle, U.S.	Carpet (i)	(United States) Renée Richards	6–1, 3–6, 6–1
87.	Feb 1979	Virginia Slims of Los Angeles, U.S.	Carpet (i)	(United States) Martina Navratilova	6–3, 6–4
88.	Apr 1979	Clairol Crown, Carlsbad, U.S.	Grass	(Australia) Dianne Fromholtz	3–6, 6–3, 6–1
89.	May 1979	Bancroft Trophy, Austria	Carpet (i)	(United States) Caroline Stoll	6–1, 6–1
90.	May 1979	French Open, France	Clay	(Australia) Wendy Turnbull	6–2, 6–0
91.	Jun 1979	Colgate International, England	Grass	(United States) Martina Navratilova	7–5, 5–7, 13–11
92.	Aug 1979	U.S. Clay Court Championships, U.S.	Clay	(Australia) Evonne Goolagong	6–4, 6–3
93.	Aug 1979	Volvo Tennis Cup, U.S.	Clay	(United States) Tracy Austin	6–7, 6–4, 6–1
94.	May 1980	Italian Open, Italy	Clay	(Romania) Virginia Ruzici	5–7, 6–2, 6–2
95.	May 1980	French Open, France	Clay	(Romania) Virginia Ruzici	6–0, 6–3
96.	Jun 1980	Crossley Carpets Trophy, United Kingdom	Grass	(Australia) Evonne Goolagong Cawley	6–3, 6–7^{(4–7)}, 7–5
97.	Aug 1980	U.S. Clay Court Championships, U.S.	Clay	(United States) Andrea Jaeger	6–4, 6–3
98.	Aug 1980	Player's Canadian Open, Canada	Hard	(Romania) Virginia Ruzici	6–3, 6–1
99.	Aug 1980	US Open, U.S.	Hard	(Czechoslovakia) Hana Mandlíková	5–7, 6–1, 6–1
100.	Oct 1980	Lynda Carter Classic, U.S.	Hard	(United States) Andrea Jaeger	6–4, 6–1
101.	Oct 1980	Daihatsu Challenge, United Kingdom	Carpet (i)	(United States) Martina Navratilova	6–4, 5–7, 6–3
102.	Mar 1981	Avon Championships of Boston, U.S.	Carpet (i)	(Socialist Federal Republic of Yugoslavia) Mima Jaušovec	6–4, 6–4
103.	Mar 1981	Clairol Crown, Carlsbad, U.S.	Clay	(Czechoslovakia) Hana Mandlíková	6–4, 6–3
104.	Apr 1981	Family Circle Cup, U.S.	Clay	(United States) Pam Shriver	6–3, 6–2
105.	Apr 1981	Murjani WTA Championships, U.S.	Clay	(United States) Martina Navratilova	6–0, 6–0
106.	May 1981	Italian Open, Italy	Clay	(Romania) Virginia Ruzici	6–1, 6–2
107.	May 1981	Toyota Swiss Open, Switzerland	Clay	(Romania) Virginia Ruzici	6–1, 6–1
108.	Jun 1981	Wimbledon Championships, England	Grass	(Czechoslovakia) Hana Mandlíková	6–2, 6–2
109.	Oct 1981	Lynda Carter Maybelline Classic, U.S.	Hard	(United States) Andrea Jaeger	4–6, 6–3, 6–0
110.	Nov 1981	NSW Building Society Open, Australia	Grass	(United States) Martina Navratilova	6–4, 2–6, 6–1
111.	Mar 1982	Citizen Cup, U.S.	Clay	(United States) Andrea Jaeger	7–6, 7–5
112.	Apr 1982	Murjani WTA Championships, U.S.	Clay	(United States) Andrea Jaeger	6–3, 6–1
113.	May 1982	Italian Open, Italy	Clay	(Czechoslovakia) Hana Mandlíková	6–0, 6–2
114.	May 1982	Toyota Swiss Open, Switzerland	Clay	(Hungary) Andrea Temesvári	6–0, 6–3
115.	Aug 1982	Toyota Women's Tennis Classic, U.S.	Hard	(United States) Susan Mascarin	6–3, 6–1
116.	Aug 1982	US Open, U.S.	Hard	(Czechoslovakia) Hana Mandlíková	6–3, 6–2
117.	Oct 1982	Lynda Carter Maybelline Classic, U.S.	Hard	(United States) Andrea Jaeger	6–1, 6–1
118.	Oct 1982	Florida Federal Open, U.S.	Hard	(United States) Andrea Jaeger	3–6, 6–1, 6–4
119.	Nov 1982	Lion's Cup, Japan	Carpet (i)	(United States) Andrea Jaeger	6–3, 6–2
120.	Nov 1982	Marlboro Australian Open, Australia	Grass	(United States) Martina Navratilova	6–3, 2–6, 6–3
121.	Jan 1983	Murjani Cup, U.S.	Clay	(United States) Andrea Jaeger	6–3, 6–3
122.	Apr 1983	Murjani WTA Championships, U.S.	Clay	(Canada) Carling Bassett-Seguso	6–3, 2–6, 7–5
123.	May 1983	German Open, Germany	Clay	(United States) Kathleen Horvath	6–4, 7–5
124.	May 1983	French Open, France	Clay	(Socialist Federal Republic of Yugoslavia) Mima Jaušovec	6–3, 6–2
125.	Oct 1983	Daihatsu Challenge, Brighton, United Kingdom	Carpet (i)	(United Kingdom) Jo Durie	6–1, 6–1
126.	Nov 1983	Lynda Carter Maybelline Classic, U.S.	Hard	(United States) Bonnie Gadusek	6–0, 6–4
127.	Mar 1984	Virginia Slims of Florida, U.S.	Clay	(United States) Bonnie Gadusek	6–0, 6–1
128.	Apr 1984	Family Circle Cup, U.S.	Clay	(West Germany) Claudia Kohde-Kilsch	6–2, 6–3
129.	Apr 1984	South African Open, South Africa	Hard (i)	(United States) Andrea Jaeger	6–3, 6–0
130.	Aug 1984	Player's International Canadian Open, Canada	Hard	(United States) Alycia Moulton	6–2, 7–6
131.	Oct 1984	Virginia Slims of Los Angeles, U.S.	Hard	(Australia) Wendy Turnbull	6–2, 6–3
132.	Nov 1984	Australian Open, Melbourne, Australia	Hard	(Czechoslovakia) Helena Suková	6–7^{(4–7)} 6–1, 6–3
133.	Jan 1985	Virginia Slims of Florida, U.S.	Hard	(United States) Martina Navratilova	6–2, 6–4
134.	Apr 1985	Ford Cup-4 Woman Special, U.S.	Clay	(Czechoslovakia) Hana Mandlíková	6–3, 6–3
135.	Apr 1985	Family Circle Cup, U.S.	Clay	(Argentina) Gabriela Sabatini	6–4, 6–0
136.	May 1985	Fila German Open, Germany	Clay	(West Germany) Steffi Graf	6–4, 7–5
137.	May 1985	French Open, France	Clay	(United States) Martina Navratilova	6–3, 6–7^{(4–7)}, 7–5
138.	Jul 1985	Virginia Slims of Newport, U.S.	Grass	(United States) Pam Shriver	6–4, 6–1
139.	Aug 1985	Canadian Open, Canada	Hard	(West Germany) Claudia Kohde-Kilsch	6–2, 6–4
140.	Sep 1985	Virginia Slims of New Orleans, U.S.	Carpet (i)	(United States) Pam Shriver	6–4, 7–5
141.	Oct 1985	Pretty Polly Classic, England	Carpet (i)	(Bulgaria) Manuela Maleeva	7–5, 6–3
142.	Nov 1985	Lion Cup, Japan	Carpet (i)	(Bulgaria) Manuela Maleeva	7–5, 6–0
143.	Jan 1986	Virginia Slims of Florida, U.S.	Hard	(West Germany) Steffi Graf	6–3, 6–1
144.	Feb 1986	Lipton International Players Championships, U.S.	Hard	(West Germany) Steffi Graf	6–4, 6–2
145.	Feb 1986	Virginia Slims of California, U.S.	Carpet (i)	(United States) Kathy Jordan	6–2, 6–4
146.	May 1986	Tournament of Champions, U.S.	Clay	(West Germany) Claudia Kohde-Kilsch	6–2, 6–4
147.	May 1986	Virginia Slims of Houston, U.S.	Clay (i)	(United States) Kathy Rinaldi	6–4, 2–6, 6–4
148.	May 1986	French Open, France	Clay	(United States) Martina Navratilova	2–6, 6–3, 6–3
149.	Mar 1987	Virginia Slims of Dallas, U.S.	Carpet (i)	(United States) Pam Shriver	6–1, 6–2
150.	Apr 1987	Virginia Slims of Houston, U.S.	Clay	(United States) Martina Navratilova	3–6, 6–1, 7–6
151.	Apr 1987	Eckerd Open, U.S.	Clay	(United States) Kate Gompert	6–3, 6–2
152.	May 1987	European Open, Switzerland	Clay	(Bulgaria) Manuela Maleeva	6–3, 4–6, 6–2
153.	Sep 1987	Virginia Slims of New Orleans, U.S.	Carpet (i)	(United States) Lori McNeil	6–3, 7–5
154.	Mar 1988	Eckerd Open, U.S.	Clay	(Spain) Arantxa Sánchez Vicario	7–6, 6–4
155.	Apr 1988	Virginia Slims of Houston, U.S.	Clay	(United States) Martina Navratilova	6–0, 6–4
156.	Aug 1988	Virginia Slims of Los Angeles, U.S.	Hard	(Argentina) Gabriela Sabatini	2–6, 6–1, 6–1
157.	Oct 1988	Virginia Slims of New Orleans, U.S.	Carpet (i)	(United States) Anne Smith	6–4, 6–1

=== Runner-ups: (73) ===
No.	Date	Tournament	Surface	Opponent	Score
1.	Sep 1970	Carolinas International Tennis Classic, U.S.	Clay	(United States) Nancy Richey	4–6, 1–6
2.	Feb 1972	Virginia Slims of Washington, U.S.	Carpet (i)	(United States) Nancy Richey	6–7, 1–6
3.	Mar 1972	Caribe Hilton Invitational, Puerto Rico	Hard	(United States) Nancy Richey	1–6, 2–6
4.	Apr 1972	Virginia Slims Masters, U.S.	Clay	(United States) Nancy Richey	3–6, 4–6
5.	May 1973	French Open, France	Clay	(Australia) Margaret Court	7–6, 6–7, 4–6
6.	Jun 1973	Italian Open, Italy	Clay	(Australia) Evonne Goolagong	6–7, 0–6
7.	Jun 1973	Wimbledon Championships, Great Britain	Grass	(United States) Billie Jean King	0–6, 5–7
8.	Aug 1973	Western Championships, U.S.	Clay	(Australia) Evonne Goolagong	2–6, 5–7
9.	Sep 1973	World Invitational Sea Pines, U.S.	Carpet (i)	(Australia) Margaret Court	walkover
10.	Dec 1973	Australian Open, Australia	Grass	(Australia) Evonne Goolagong	6–7, 6–4, 0–6
11.	Jan 1974	Virginia Slims of San Francisco, U.S.	Carpet (i)	(United States) Billie Jean King	6–7^{(2–5)}, 2–6
12.	Mar 1974	S&H Women's National Indoor Championship, U.S.	Carpet (i)	(United States) Billie Jean King	3–6, 6–3, 2–6
13.	Sep 1974	Virginia Slims of Denver, U.S.	Carpet (i)	(Australia) Evonne Goolagong	5–7, 6–3, 4–6
14.	Oct 1974	Virginia Slims Championships, U.S.	Carpet (i)	(Australia) Evonne Goolagong	3–6, 4–6
15.	Jan 1975	Virginia Slims of Sarasota, U.S.	Carpet (i)	(United States) Billie Jean King	2–6, 3–6
16.	Mar 1975	Virginia Slims of Philadelphia, U.S.	Carpet (i)	(United Kingdom) Virginia Wade	6–7, 4–6
17.	Jan 1976	Virginia Slims of Houston, U.S.	Carpet (i)	(United States) Martina Navratilova	3–6, 4–6
18.	Mar 1976	Virginia Slims of Philadelphia, U.S.	Carpet (i)	(Australia) Evonne Goolagong	3–6, 6–7
19.	Apr 1976	Virginia Slims Championships, U.S.	Carpet (i)	(Australia) Evonne Goolagong	3–6, 7–5, 3–6
20.	Nov 1976	Dewar Cup, London, Great Britain	Hard	(United Kingdom) Virginia Wade	2–6, 2–6
21.	Jan 1977	Virginia Slims of Washington, U.S.	Carpet (i)	(United States) Martina Navratilova	2–6, 3–6
22.	Mar 1978	Virginia Slims of Minneapolis, U.S.	Carpet (i)	(Australia) Evonne Goolagong	6–4, 1–6, 4–6
23.	Jun 1978	Colgate International, Great Britain	Grass	(United States) Martina Navratilova	4–6, 6–4, 7–9
24.	Jun 1978	Wimbledon Championships, Great Britain	Grass	(United States) Martina Navratilova	6–2, 4–6, 5–7
25.	Jan 1979	Virginia Slims of Oakland, U.S.	Carpet (i)	(United States) Martina Navratilova	5–7, 5–7
26.	Feb 1979	Virginia Slims of Dallas, U.S.	Carpet (i)	(United States) Martina Navratilova	4–6, 4–6
27.	Jun 1979	Wimbledon Championships, Great Britain	Grass	(United States) Martina Navratilova	4–6, 4–6
28.	Aug 1979	US Open, U.S.	Hard	(United States) Tracy Austin	3–6, 4–6
29.	Oct 1979	Thunderbird Classic, Phoenix, U.S.	Hard	(United States) Martina Navratilova	1–6, 3–6
30.	Nov 1979	Diahatsu Challenge, Brighton, United Kingdom	Carpet (i)	(United States) Martina Navratilova	3–6, 3–6
31.	Jan 1980	Avon Championships of Kansas, U.S.	Carpet (i)	(United States) Tracy Austin	2–6, 1–6
32.	Jan 1980	Avon Championships of Chicago, U.S.	Carpet (i)	(United States) Martina Navratilova	4–6, 4–6
33.	Jun 1980	Wimbledon Championships, Great Britain	Grass	(Australia) Evonne Goolagong	1–6, 6–7^{(4–7)}
34.	Aug 1981	Player's Canadian Open, Canada	Hard	(United States) Tracy Austin	1–6, 4–6
35.	Nov 1981	Lion's Cup, Tokyo, Japan	Carpet (i)	(United States) Martina Navratilova	3–6, 2–6
36.	Nov 1981	Toyota Australian Open, Melbourne, Australia	Grass	(United States) Martina Navratilova	7–6^{(7–4)}, 4–6, 5–7
37.	Feb 1982	Avon Championships of California, U.S.	Carpet (i)	(United States) Andrea Jaeger	6–7, 3–6
38.	Jun 1982	Wimbledon Championships, United Kingdom	Grass	(United States) Martina Navratilova	2–6, 6–3, 2–6
39.	Oct 1982	Daihatsu Challenge, United Kingdom	Carpet	(United States) Martina Navratilova	1–6, 4–6
40.	Dec 1982	Toyota Series Championships, U.S.	Hard (i)	(United States) Martina Navratilova	6–4, 1–6, 2–6
41.	Mar 1983	Virginia Slims of Dallas, U.S.	Carpet (i)	(United States) Martina Navratilova	4–6, 0–6
42.	Mar 1983	Virginia Slims Championships, U.S.	Carpet (i)	(United States) Martina Navratilova	2–6, 0–6
43.	Aug 1983	Virginia Slims of Los Angeles, U.S.	Carpet (i)	(United States) Martina Navratilova	1–6, 3–6
44.	Aug 1983	Player's Canadian Open, U.S.	Hard	(United States) Martina Navratilova	4–6, 6–4, 1–6
45.	Aug 1983	US Open, U.S.	Hard	(United States) Martina Navratilova	1–6, 3–6
46.	Nov 1983	Lion's Cup, Tokyo, Japan	Carpet	(United States) Martina Navratilova	2–6, 2–6
47.	Feb 1984	US Indoors, Livingston, New Jersey, U.S.	Carpet (i)	(United States) Martina Navratilova	6–2, 7–6
48.	Feb 1984	Virginia Slims Championships, U.S.	Carpet (i)	(United States) Martina Navratilova	3–6, 5–7, 1–6
49.	Apr 1984	Lipton WTA Championships, U.S.	Clay	(United States) Martina Navratilova	2–6, 0–6
50.	May 1984	Italian Open, Italy	Clay	(Bulgaria) Manuela Maleeva	3–6, 3–6
51.	May 1984	French Open, France	Clay	(United States) Martina Navratilova	3–6, 1–6
52.	Jun 1984	Wimbledon Championships, United Kingdom	Grass	(United States) Martina Navratilova	6–7^{(5–7)}, 2–6
53.	Aug 1984	US Open, U.S.	Hard	(United States) Martina Navratilova	6–4, 4–6, 4–6
54.	Feb 1985	Lipton International Players Championships, U.S.	Hard	(United States) Martina Navratilova	2–6, 4–6
55.	Feb 1985	Virginia Slims of California, U.S.	Carpet (i)	(Czechoslovakia) Hana Mandlíková	2–6, 4–6
56.	Mar 1985	Virginia Slims of Dallas, U.S.	Carpet (i)	(United States) Martina Navratilova	3–6, 4–6
57.	Apr 1985	Murjani WTA Championships, U.S.	Clay	(United States) Zina Garrison	4–6, 3–6
58.	Jun 1985	Wimbledon Championships, United Kingdom	Grass	(United States) Martina Navratilova	6–4, 3–6, 2–6
59.	Nov 1985	Australian Open, Australia	Grass	(United States) Martina Navratilova	2–6, 6–4, 2–6
60.	Mar 1986	Virginia Slims of Dallas, U.S.	Carpet (i)	(United States) Martina Navratilova	2–6, 1–6
61.	Apr 1986	Family Circle Cup, U.S.	Clay	(West Germany) Steffi Graf	4–6, 5–7
62.	Aug 1986	Virginia Slims of Los Angeles, U.S.	Hard	(United States) Martina Navratilova	6–7, 3–6
63.	Feb 1987	Lipton International Players Championships, U.S.	Hard	(West Germany) Steffi Graf	1–6, 2–6
64.	Aug 1987	Virginia Slims of Los Angeles, U.S.	Hard	(West Germany) Steffi Graf	3–6, 4–6
65.	Oct 1987	Porsche Tennis Grand Prix, West Germany	Carpet (i)	(United States) Martina Navratilova	5–7, 1–6
66.	Nov 1987	Virginia Slims of New England, U.S.	Hard (i)	(United States) Pam Shriver	4–6, 6–4, 0–6
67.	Jan 1988	Australian Open, Australia	Grass	(West Germany) Steffi Graf	1–6, 6–7^{(3–7)}
68.	Mar 1988	Lipton International Players Championships, U.S.	Hard	(West Germany) Steffi Graf	4–6, 4–6
69.	Oct 1988	Porsche Tennis Grand Prix, West Germany	Carpet(i)	(United States) Martina Navratilova	2–6, 3–6
70.	Nov 1988	Virginia Slims of Chicago, U.S.	Carpet (i)	(United States) Martina Navratilova	2–6, 2–6
71.	Mar 1989	Virginia Slims of Florida, U.S.	Hard	(West Germany) Steffi Graf	6–4, 2–6, 3–6
72.	Mar 1989	Lipton International Players Championships, U.S.	Hard	(Argentina) Gabriela Sabatini	1–6, 6–4, 2–6
73.	Apr 1989	Virginia Slims of Houston, U.S.	Clay	(Socialist Federal Republic of Yugoslavia) Monica Seles	6–3, 1–6, 4–6

== WTA Tour career earnings ==
Year	Grand Slam singles titles	WTA singles titles	Total singles titles	Earnings ($)	Money list rank
1970–72	0	11	11	274,408	n/a
1973	0	12	12	152,002	3
1974	2	14	16	261,460	1
1975	2	14	16	370,227	1
1976	2	10	12	343,165	1
1977	1	10	11	503,134	1
1978	1	6	7	454,486	1
1979	1	7	8	528,457	2
1980	2	6	8	448,509	3
1981	1	8	9	572,162	2
1982	2	8	10	689,485	2
1983	1	5	6	430,436	2
1984	1	5	6	593,135	2
1985	1	9	10	972,782	2
1986	1	5	6	833,755	2
1987	0	5	5	769,943	3
1988	0	4	4	698,649	4
1989	0	0	0	No information
Career	18	139	157	8,896,195	23

== Record against other top players ==
Evert's win–loss record against certain players who have been ranked World No. 10 or higher is as follows:

Players who have been ranked World No. 1 are in boldface.

- (United Kingdom) Virginia Wade 40–6
- (Czechoslovakia) / (United States) **Martina Navratilova** 37–43
- (Australia) **Evonne Goolagong** 26–13
- (Romania) Virginia Ruzici 24–0
- (United Kingdom) Sue Barker 23–1
- (Netherlands) Betty Stöve 22–0
- (United States) Rosemary Casals 22–1
- (Australia) Wendy Turnbull 21–1
- (Czechoslovakia) / (Australia) Hana Mandlíková 21–7
- (United States) Pam Shriver 19–3
- (United States) **Billie Jean King** 19–7
- (Australia) Kerry Reid 18–2
- (Bulgaria) / (Switzerland) Manuela Maleeva 17–2
- (Czechoslovakia) / (Czech Republic) Helena Suková 17–2
- (United States) Andrea Jaeger 17–3
- (Germany) Sylvia Hanika 16–1
- (Australia) Dianne Fromholtz 16–3
- (Soviet Union) Olga Morozova 15–0
- (Germany) Bettina Bunge 14–0
- (Socialist Federal Republic of Yugoslavia) Mima Jaušovec 14–0
- (France) Françoise Dürr 13–0
- (Germany) Claudia Kohde-Kilsch 13–0
- (United States) Bonnie Gadusek 12–0
- (United States) Kathy Jordan 12–3
- (Canada) Carling Bassett-Seguso 9–0
- (United Kingdom) Jo Durie 9–0
- (United States) Kathy Rinaldi 9–0
- (United States) Zina Garrison 9–2
- (Australia) **Margaret Court** 9–4
- (United States) **Tracy Austin** 8–9
- (United States) Barbara Potter 8–0
- (United States) Mary Joe Fernández 7–0
- (United States) Kathy Horvath 7–0
- (United States) Lisa Bonder 7–1
- (United States) Stephanie Rehe 6–0
- (South Africa) Greer Stevens 6–1
- (Argentina) Gabriela Sabatini 6–3
- (United States) Nancy Richey 6–5
- (Germany) **Steffi Graf** 6–8
- (Sweden) Catarina Lindqvist 4–0
- (United States) Kathy May 4–0
- (Czechoslovakia) / (Czech Republic) Jana Novotná 3–0
- (France) Nathalie Tauziat 3–0
- (Hungary) Andrea Temesvári 3–0
- (United States) Lori McNeil 3–2
- (Bulgaria) Katerina Maleeva 2–0
- (Spain) Conchita Martínez 2–0
- (United States) Kristien Shaw 2–0
- (Socialist Federal Republic of Yugoslavia) / (Federal Republic of Yugoslavia) / (United States) **Monica Seles** 2–1
- (Austria) Barbara Paulus 1–1
- (Spain) **Arantxa Sánchez Vicario 1–1**
- (Soviet Union) / (Belarus) Natasha Zvereva 1–1

== 125-match clay court winning streak from August 1973 to May 1979 ==
- 1973:
  - US Clay Court Championships, IN. (d. Pat Bostrom 6–0 6–0; Isabel Fernandez 6–3 6–4; Pat Pretorius 6–2 6–1; Linda Tuero 6–0 6–0; Veronica Burton 6–4 6–3 in final);
  - Columbus, GA. (d. Janet Haas 6–1 6–0; Francoise Durr 6–0 6–2; Laurie Fleming 6–4 6–0; Rosie Casals 6–3 7–6; won by default over Margaret Court – defaults not counted as matches in streak);
  - Virginia Slims Championships, Boca Raton, FL. (d. Kristien Kemmer-Shaw 6–2 6–3; Karen Krantzcke 6–0 6–0; Julie Heldman 6–2 6–4; Kerry Melville 6–1 6–2; Nancy Richey 6–3 6–3 in final)
- 1974:
  - Ft. Lauderdale, FL. (d. Laurie Fleming 6–1 6–2; Wendy Overton 6–0 6–3; Betty Stove 6–3 6–4; Rose Casals 6–0 6–1; won by default over Kerry Melville);
  - Sarasota, FL. (d. Carrie Meyer 6–1 6–2; Sue Stap 6–1 6–1; Betty Stove 6–0 6–1; Olga Morozova 6–2 6–0; Evonne Goolagong 6–4 6–0 in final);
  - St. Petersburg, FL. (d. Pat Bostrom 6–0 6–1; Glynis Coles 6–1 6–3; Karen Krantzcke 6–7 6–0 6–0; Helga Masthoff 6–1 6–1; Kerry Melville 6–0 6–1 in final);
  - Family Circle Cup, SC. (d. Kerry Harris 6–1 6–2; Wendy Overton def.; Betty Stove 6–2 6–3; Rosie Casals 6–1 6–0; Kerry Melville 6–1 6–3 in final);
  - Italian Open, Rome (d. Lita Sugiarto 7–5 6–2; Marie Neumannova 4–6 6–1 6–4; Kazuko Sawamatsu 6–1 6–1; Olga Morozova 6–1 1–6 6–0; Martina Navratilova 6–3 6–3 in final);
  - French Open, Paris (d. Regina Marsikova 6–1 6–4; Virginia Ruzici 6–2 6–3; Vicky Baldovinos 6–2 6–2; Julie Heldman 6–0 7–5; Helga Masthoff 7–5 6–4; Olga Morozova 6–1 6–2 in final);
  - US Clay Court Championships, IN. (d. Helle Sparre 6–0 6–0; Roberta Stark 6–2 6–2; Virginia Ruzici 6–0 6–1; Carrie Meyer 6–1 6–2; Gail Chanfreau 6–0 6–0 in final);
  - Canadian Open, Toronto (d. Maria Nasuelli 6–1 6–2; Gail Chanfreau 6–0 6–2; Laurie Tenney 6–0 6–0; Kazuko Sawamatsu 6–0 6–1; Julie Heldman 6–0 6–3 in final)
- 1975:
  - Family Circle Cup, FL. (d. Carrie Meyer 6–0 6–0; Rosie Casals 6–1 6–0; Francoise Durr 6–2 6–0; Evonne Goolagong 6–1 6–1; Martina Navratilova 7–5 6–4 in final);
  - Italian Open, Rome (d. Rosalba Vido 6–0 6–2; Sue Barker 6–1 6–3; Fiorella Bonicelli 6–1 6–3; Mima Jausovec 6–2 6–0; Martina Navratilova 6–1 6–0 in final);
  - French Open, Paris (d. Carmen Perea 6–2 6–2; Mima Jausovec 6–2 6–3; Renata Tomanova 6–3 6–2; Kazuko Sawamatsu 6–2 6–2; Olga Morozova 6–4 6–0; Martina Navratilova 2–6 6–2 6–1 in final);
  - US Clay Court Championships, IN. (d. Paulina Peisachov 6–0 6–2; Glynis Coles 6–2 6–0; Donna Ganz 6–1 6–2; Nancy Richey 6–7 7–5 4–2 ret. Evert recovered from 7–6 5–0 40–15 down to win this match and keep streak alive at 73 matches; Dianne Fromholtz 6–3 6–4 in final);
  - Rye, NY. (d. Gail Chanfreau 6–2 6–1; Mima Jausovec def.; Mona Schallau 6–0 6–4; Margaret Court 6–3 6–3; Virginia Wade 6–0 6–1 in final);
  - US Open, NY. (d. Lesley Hunt 6–1 6–0; Natasha Chmyreva 6–0 6–3; Wendy Overton 6–0 6–1; Kerry Melville 6–2 6–1; Martina Navratilova 6–4 6–4; Evonne Goolagong 5–7 6–4 6–2 in final);
  - Orlando, FL. (d. Janet Newberry 6–1 6–2; Isabel Fernandez 6–1 6–4; Linky Boshoff 6–2 6–2; Rosie Casals 6–0 6–2; Martina Navratilova def. in final);
  - World Invitational, SC. (d. Rosie Casals 6–0 6–1; Evonne Goolagong 6–1 6–1 in final)
- 1976:
  - Family Circle Cup, FL. (d. Wendy Turnbull 6–2 6–1; Torry Ann Fretz 6–0 6–0; Betty Stove 6–4 6–4; Mary Struthers 6–0 6–0; Kerry Melville-Reid 6–2 6–2 in final);
  - US Open, NY. (d. Greer Stevens 6–1 6–0; Glynis Coles 6–0 6–0; Sue Barker 6–1 6–0; Natasha Chmyreva 6–1 6–2; Mima Jausovec 6–3 6–1; Evonne Goolagong 6–3 6–0 in final)
- 1977:
  - Family Circle Cup, SC. (d. Bunny Bruning 6–0 6–3; Wendy Turnbull 6–1 6–0; Kath May 6–0 6–1; Mima Jausovec 6–3 6–3; Billie Jean King 6–0 6–1 in final);
  - US Open, NY. (d. Sharon Walsh 6–1 6–0; Pam Whytcross 6–0 6–0; Helena Anliot 6–2 6–2; Nancy Richey 6–3 6–0; Billie Jean King 6–2 6–0; Betty Stove 6–3 7–5; Wendy Turnbull 7–6 6–2 in final)
- 1978:
  - Family Circle Cup, SC. (d. Beth Norton 6–1 6–0; Mima Jausovec 6–0 6–1; Renee Richards 6–4 6–3; Tracy Austin 6–3 6–1; Kerry Melville-Reid 6–2 6–0 in final)
- 1979:
  - Fed Cup, Madrid (d. Sylvia Hanika 6–4 6–2; Brigitte Simon 6–0 6–0; Olga Morozova 6–4 8–6; Dianne Fromholtz 2–6 6–3 8–6);
  - Italian Open, Rome (d. JoAnne Russell 6–1 6–2; Janet Newberry 6–2 6–1; Ivanna Madruga 3–6 6–1 6–4; lost semi-final to Tracy Austin 4–6 6–2 6–7^{(4–7)})

Statistics: 71 of the 258 sets (or 28%) were 6–0. Only 8 of the 125 matches were three-setters. From the beginning of this run, Evert did not lose a set on clay in 1973 or between 1976 and 1978. She had runs of 76, 65, and 50 consecutive sets won during the streak.

== See also ==
- Evert–Navratilova rivalry
