= 1972 British Motor Cars Invitational =

- Date: January 12–15
- Edition: 2nd
- Category: WT Women's Pro Tour
- Prize money: $17,000
- Surface: Carpet (Sportface) / indoor
- Location: San Francisco, United States
- Venue: Civic Auditorium

Champions

Singles
- (United States) Billie Jean King

Doubles
- (United States) Rosie Casals (United Kingdom) Virginia Wade
← 1971 ·	British Motor Cars Invitational	· 1973 →

The 1972 British Motor Cars Invitational, also known as the BMC Invitational, was a women's tennis tournament that took place on indoor carpet courts at the Civic Auditorium in San Francisco in the United States. It was the second edition of the event and was held from January 12 through January 15, 1972. First-seeded Billie Jean King won the singles title, her second consecutive at the event, and earned $3,400 first-prize money.

== Finals ==
=== Singles ===
(United States) Billie Jean King defeated (Australia) Kerry Melville 7–6^{(5–0)}, 7–6^{(5–2)}

=== Doubles ===
(United States) Rosie Casals / (United Kingdom) Virginia Wade defeated (France) Françoise Dürr / (Australia) Judy Dalton 6–3, 5–7, 6–2

== Prize money ==
Event	W	F	3rd	4th	QF	Round of 16
Singles	$3,400	$2,200	$1,500	$1,200	$700	$350
