= 1985 Family Circle Cup =

- Date: April 8–14
- Edition: 13th
- Category: Category 4
- Draw: 56S / 32D
- Prize money: $200,000
- Surface: Clay / outdoor
- Location: Hilton Head Island, SC, U.S.
- Venue: Sea Pines Plantation

Champions

Singles
- (United States) Chris Evert-Lloyd

Doubles
- (South Africa) Rosalyn Fairbank / (United States) Pam Shriver
- Family Circle Cup

The 1985 Family Circle Cup was a women's tennis tournament played on outdoor clay courts at the Sea Pines Plantation on Hilton Head Island, South Carolina in the United States and was part of the Category 4 tier of the 1985 WTA Tour. It was the 13th edition of the tournament and ran from April 8 through April 14, 1985. First-seeded Chris Evert-Lloyd won the singles title, her second consecutive and eighth in total at the event.

== Finals ==
=== Singles ===
(United States) Chris Evert-Lloyd defeated (Argentina) Gabriela Sabatini 6–4, 6–0

- It was Evert-Lloyd's 3rd singles title of the year and the 135th of her career.

=== Doubles ===
(South Africa) Rosalyn Fairbank / (United States) Pam Shriver defeated (Soviet Union) Svetlana Parkhomenko / (Soviet Union) Larisa Savchenko 6–4, 6–1

- It was Fairbank's 1st doubles title of the year and the 10th of her career. It was Shriver's 3rd doubles title of the year and the 59th of her career.
