= 1975 Virginia Slims of Chicago =

- Date: February 10–15
- Edition: 4th
- Category: Virginia Slims circuit
- Draw: 32S / 10D
- Prize money: $75,000
- Surface: Carpet (Sporteze) / indoor
- Location: Chicago, Illinois, U.S.
- Venue: Chicago Amphitheatre

Champions

Singles
- (Australia) Margaret Court

Doubles
- (United States) Chris Evert / (Czechoslovakia) Martina Navratilova
- Virginia Slims of Chicago

The 1975 Virginia Slims of Chicago was a women's tennis tournament played on indoor carpet courts at the Chicago Amphitheatre in Chicago, Illinois in the United States that was part of the 1975 Virginia Slims World Championship Series. The tournament was held from February 10 through February 15, 1975. Third-seeded Margaret Court won the singles title and earned $15,000 first-prize money.

== Finals ==
=== Singles ===
(Australia) Margaret Court defeated (Czechoslovakia) Martina Navratilova 6–3, 3–6, 6–2

=== Doubles ===
(United States) Chris Evert / (Czechoslovakia) Martina Navratilova defeated (Australia) Margaret Court / (Soviet Union) Olga Morozova 6–2, 7–5

== Prize money ==
Event	W	F	3rd	4th	QF	Round of 16	Round of 32
Singles	$15,000	$8,500	$4,600	$3,800	$2,100	$1,100	$550
