= 1973 British Motor Cars Invitational =

- Date: January 16–20
- Edition: 3rd
- Category: WT Women's Pro Tour
- Draw: 16S / 8D
- Prize money: $25,000
- Surface: Carpet (Sportface) / indoor
- Location: San Francisco, United States
- Venue: Civic Auditorium

Champions

Singles
- (Australia) Margaret Court

Doubles
- (Australia) Margaret Court (Australia) Lesley Hunt
← 1972 ·	Stanford Classic	· 1974 →

The British Motor Cars Invitational, also known as the 1973 BMC Invitational, was a women's tennis tournament that took place on indoor carpet courts at the Civic Auditorium in San Francisco in the United States. It was the third edition of the event and was held from January 16 through January 20, 1973. The singles final was watched by 5,3000 spectators who saw second-seeded Margaret Court win the title, earning $6,000 first-prize money.

== Finals ==
=== Singles ===
(Australia) Margaret Court defeated (Australia) Kerry Melville 6–3, 6–3

=== Doubles ===
(Australia) Margaret Court / (Australia) Lesley Hunt defeated (United States) Wendy Overton / (United States) Valerie Ziegenfuss 6–1, 7–5

== Prize money ==
Event	W	F	3rd	4th	QF	Round of 16
Singles	$6,000	$3,000	$1,900	$1,600	$1,000	$?
