= 1976 Virginia Slims of San Francisco =

- Date: March 1–6
- Edition: 6th
- Category: Virginia Slims Circuit
- Draw: 34S / 16D
- Prize money: $75,000
- Surface: Carpet (Sporteze) / indoor
- Location: San Francisco, United States
- Venue: Civic Auditorium

Champions

Singles
- (United States) Chris Evert

Doubles
- (United States) Billie Jean King / (Netherlands) Betty Stöve
← 1975 ·	Stanford Classic	· 1977 →

The 1976 Virginia Slims of San Francisco, was a women's tennis tournament that took place on indoor carpet courts at the Civic Auditorium in San Francisco in the United States. It was the sixth edition of the event, which was part of the Virginia Slims Circuit, and was held from March 1 through March 6, 1976. The final was watched by 4,800 spectators who saw second-seeded Chris Evert win the singles title, earning $15,000 first-prize money.

== Finals ==
=== Singles ===
(United States) Chris Evert defeated (Australia) Evonne Goolagong Cawley 7–5, 7–6^{(5–2)}

- It was Evert's 5th singles title of the year and the 60th of her career.

=== Doubles ===
(United States) Billie Jean King / (Netherlands) Betty Stöve defeated (United States) Rosemary Casals / (France) Françoise Dürr 6–4, 6–1

== Prize money ==
Event	W	F	SF	QF	Round of 16	Round of 32	Prel. round
Singles	$15,000	$8,000	$4,275	$1,900	$1,100	$550	$375
