= 1979 Avon Championships of California =

- Date: January 8–14
- Edition: 8th
- Category: Virginia Slims circuit
- Draw: 32S / 16D
- Prize money: $125,000
- Surface: Carpet (Sporteze) / indoor
- Location: Oakland, California, US
- Venue: Oakland Coliseum

Champions

Singles
- (United States) Martina Navratilova

Doubles
- (United States) Chris Evert / (United States) Rosie Casals
← 1977 ·	Stanford Classic	· 1980 →

The 1979 Avon Championships of California, also known as the Avon Championships of Oakland, was a women's tennis tournament played on indoor carpet courts at the Oakland Coliseum in Oakland, California in the United States that was part of the 1979 Avon Championships Circuit. It was the eighth edition of the tournament and was held from January 8 through January 14, 1979. First-seeded Martina Navratilova won the singles title and earned $24,000 first-prize money.

== Finals ==
=== Singles ===
(United States) Martina Navratilova defeated (United States) Chris Evert 7–5, 7–5

- It was Navratilova's 1st singles title of the year and the 25th of her career.

=== Doubles ===
(United States) Chris Evert / (United States) Rosie Casals defeated (United States) Tracy Austin / (Netherlands) Betty Stöve 3–6, 6–4, 6–3

== Prize money ==
Event	W	F	3rd	4th	QF	Round of 16	Round of 32
Singles	$24,000	$12,000	$6,500	$6,200	$3,000	$1,600	$900

== See also ==
- Evert–Navratilova rivalry
