= 1977 Wyler's Classic =

- Date: October 3–9
- Edition: 2nd
- Category: Colgate Series (AA)
- Draw: 32S / 16D
- Prize money: $75,000
- Surface: Carpet / indoor
- Location: Atlanta, United States
- Venue: Alexander Memorial Coliseum

Champions

Singles
- (United States) Chris Evert

Doubles
- (United States) Martina Navratilova / (Netherlands) Betty Stöve
← 1975 ·	WTA Atlanta	· 1978 →

The 1977 Wyler's Classic, also known as the Atlanta Women's Tennis Classic, was a women's singles tennis tournament played on indoor carpet courts at the Alexander Memorial Coliseum in Atlanta, Georgia in the United States. The event was part of the AA (Note: Tournaments with prize money for women of at least $75,000.) category of the 1977 Colgate Series. It was the second edition of the tournament and was held from October 3 through October 9, 1977. First-seeded Chris Evert won the singles title, her second at the event after 1975, and earned $14,000 first-prize money.

== Finals ==
=== Singles ===
(United States) Chris Evert defeated (Australia) Dianne Fromholtz 6–3, 6–2

- It was Evert's 10th singles title of the year and the 77th of her career.

=== Doubles ===
(United States) Martina Navratilova / (Netherlands) Betty Stöve defeated (South Africa) Brigitte Cuypers / (South Africa) Marise Kruger 6–4, 6–2

== Prize money ==
Event	W	F	SF	QF	Round of 16	Round of 32
Singles	$14,000	$7,000	$3,500	$1,850	$1,000	$550
