= 1977 Virginia Slims of San Francisco =

- Date: February 27 – March 6
- Edition: 7th
- Category: Virginia Slims Circuit
- Draw: 34S / 8D
- Prize money: $100,000
- Surface: Carpet (Sporteze) / indoor
- Location: San Francisco, United States
- Venue: Civic Auditorium
- Attendance: 29,600

Champions

Singles
- (United Kingdom) Sue Barker

Doubles
- (Australia) Kerry Reid / (South Africa) Greer Stevens
← 1976 ·	Stanford Classic	· 1979 →

The 1977 Virginia Slims of San Francisco, was a women's tennis tournament that took place on indoor carpet courts at the Civic Auditorium in San Francisco in the United States. It was the seventh edition of the event, which was part of the Virginia Slims Circuit, and was held from February 27, through March 6, 1977. The final was watched by 5,932 spectators who saw second-seeded Sue Barker win the singles title, earning her $20,000 first-prize money.

== Finals ==
=== Singles ===
(United Kingdom) Sue Barker defeated (United Kingdom) Virginia Wade 6–3, 6–4

=== Doubles ===
(Australia) Kerry Reid / (South Africa) Greer Stevens defeated (United Kingdom) Sue Barker / (United States) Ann Kiyomura 6–3, 6–1

== Prize money ==
Event	W	F	SF	QF	Round of 16	Round of 32	Prel. round
Singles	$20,000	$10,000	$5,400	$2,500	$1,375	$775	$400
