= 1975 Barnett Bank Tennis Classic =

Women's tennis tournament

- Date: October 13–19
- Edition: 2nd
- Category: Grand Prix
- Draw: 56S / 16D
- Prize money: $50,000
- Surface: Clay / outdoor
- Location: Orlando, Florida, U.S.
- Venue: Orlando Racquet Club

Champions

Singles
- (United States) Chris Evert

Doubles
- (United States) Rosemary Casals / (United States) Wendy Overton
← 1974 ·	Barnett Bank Tennis Classic

The 1975 Barnett Bank Tennis Classic was a women's tennis tournament played on outdoor green clay courts at the Orlando Racquet Club in Orlando, Florida in the United States. It was part of the Women's International Grand Prix of the 1975 WTA Tour. It was the second and last edition of the tournament and was held from October 13 through October 19, 1975. First-seeded Chris Evert won the singles title and earned $10,000 first-prize money after Martina Navratilova had to forfeit her singles and doubles finals due to bursitis in her left shoulder.

== Finals ==
=== Singles ===
(United States) Chris Evert defeated (Czechoslovakia) Martina Navratilova walkover

- It was Evert's 15th singles title of the year and the 54th of her career.

=== Doubles ===
(United States) Rosemary Casals / (United States) Wendy Overton defeated (United States) Chris Evert / (Czechoslovakia) Martina Navratilova walkover

== Prize money ==
Event	W	F	SF	QF	Round of 16	Round of 32	Round of 64
Singles	$10,000	$4,100	$2,600	$1,300	$600	$350	$200
