= 1974 Virginia Slims of San Francisco =

- Date: January 14–19
- Edition: 4th
- Category: Virginia Slims Circuit
- Draw: 32S / 8D
- Prize money: $50,000
- Surface: Carpet (Sportface) / indoor
- Location: San Francisco, United States
- Venue: Civic Auditorium
- Attendance: 25,000+

Champions

Singles
- (United States) Billie Jean King

Doubles
- (United States) Chris Evert / (United States) Billie Jean King
← 1973 ·	Stanford Classic	· 1975 →

The 1974 Virginia Slims of San Francisco was a women's tennis tournament that took place on indoor carpet courts at the Civic Auditorium in San Francisco in the United States. It was the fourth edition of the event, which was part of the Virginia Slims Circuit, and was held from January 14 through January 19, 1974. Second-seeded Billie Jean King won the singles title, her third after 1971 and 1972, and earned $10,000 first-prize money.

== Finals ==
=== Singles ===
(United States) Billie Jean King defeated (United States) Chris Evert 7–6^{(5–2)}, 6–2

=== Doubles ===
(United States) Chris Evert / (United States) Billie Jean King defeated (France) Françoise Dürr / (Netherlands) Betty Stöve 6–4, 6–2

== Prize money ==
Event	W	F	3rd	4th	QF	Round of 16	Round of 32
Singles	$10,000	$5,600	$3,000	$2,600	$1,400	$700	$350
