= 1982 Lynda Carter Maybelline Classic =

- Date: October 4–10
- Edition: 3rd
- Category: Toyota Series (Cat 4)
- Draw: 32S / 16D
- Prize money: $125,000
- Surface: Hard / outdoor
- Location: Deerfield Beach, Florida, U.S.
- Venue: Deer Creek Racquet Club

Champions

Singles
- (United States) Chris Evert-Lloyd

Doubles
- (United States) Barbara Potter / (United States) Sharon Walsh
- Maybelline Classic

The 1982 Lynda Carter Maybelline Classic, also known as the Lynda Carter Classic, was a women's tennis tournament played on outdoor hard courts at the Deer Creek Racquet Club in Deerfield Beach, Florida in the United States that was part of the Toyota Series of the 1982 Avon Championships World Championship Series. It was the third edition of the tournament and was held from October 4 through October 10, 1982. First-seeded Chris Evert-Lloyd won her third consecutive singles title at the event and earned $22,000 first-prize money.

== Finals ==
=== Singles ===
(United States) Chris Evert-Lloyd defeated (United States) Andrea Jaeger 6–1, 6–1

- It was Evert's 7th singles title of the year and the 117th of her career.

=== Doubles ===
(United States) Barbara Potter / (United States) Sharon Walsh defeated (United States) Rosie Casals / (Australia) Wendy Turnbull 7–6^{(7–5)}, 7–6^{(7–3)}

- It was Potter's 4th doubles title of the year and the 11th of her career. It was Walsh's 4th doubles title of the year and the 20th of her career.

== Prize money ==
| Event | W | F | SF | QF | Round of 16 | Round of 32 |
| Singles | $22,000 | $11,000 | $5,775 | $2,800 | $1,450 | $725 |
