= 1975 Little Mo Classic =

- Date: September 15–21
- Edition: 1st
- Category: Women's International Grand Prix
- Draw: 56S / 16D
- Prize money: $75,000
- Surface: Carpet / indoor
- Location: Atlanta, United States
- Venue: Omni Coliseum
- Attendance: 31,947

Champions

Singles
- (United States) Chris Evert

Doubles
- (United States) Martina Navratilova / (Netherlands) Betty Stöve
WTA Atlanta	· 1977 →

The 1975 Little Mo Classic was a women's singles tennis tournament played on indoor carpet courts at the Omni Coliseum in Atlanta, Georgia in the United States. The event was part of the 1975 Women's International Grand Prixs. It was the inaugural edition of the tournament and was held from September 15 through September 21, 1975. First-seeded Chris Evert won the singles title and earned $15,000 first-prize money. The tournament was named after Maureen Connolly and held to benefit the tennis foundation in her name.

== Finals ==
=== Singles ===
(United States) Chris Evert defeated (Czechoslovakia) Martina Navratilova 2–6, 6–2, 6–0

- It was Evert's 13th singles title of the year and the 52nd of her career.

=== Doubles ===
(United States) Chris Evert / (Czechoslovakia) Martina Navratilova defeated (France) Françoise Dürr / (Netherlands) Betty Stöve 6–4, 5–7, 6–2

== Prize money ==
Event	W	F	SF	QF	Round of 16	Round of 32	Round of 64
Singles	$15,000	$7,500	$3,500	$1,900	$850	$425	$300

== See also ==
- Evert–Navratilova rivalry
- 1975 Maureen Connolly Memorial
