= 1975 Medi-Quik Open =

- Date: August 18–24
- Edition: 4th
- Draw: 56S / 8D
- Prize money: $75,000
- Surface: Clay (Har-Tru) / outdoors
- Location: Harrison, New York, U.S.
- Venue: Westchester Country Club

Champions

Singles
- (United States) Chris Evert

Doubles
- (United States) Chris Evert / (Czechoslovakia) Martina Navratilova
← 1973 ·	Medi-Quik Open	· 1976 →

The 1975 Medi-Quik Open, also known as the Medi-Quik Women's Tennis Classic, was a women's tennis tournament played on outdoor clay courts at the Westchester Country Club in Harrison, New York in the United States. It was part of the 1975 Virginia Slims WTA Tour and was held from August 18 through August 24, 1975. First-seeded Chris Evert won the singles title and earned $14,000 first-prize money.

== Finals ==
=== Singles ===
(United States) Chris Evert defeated (United Kingdom) Virginia Wade 6–0, 6–1

- It was Evert's 10th singles title of the year and the 49th of her career.

=== Doubles ===
(United States) Chris Evert / (Czechoslovakia) Martina Navratilova defeated (Australia) Margaret Court / (United Kingdom) Virginia Wade 7–5, 6–7, 6–4

== Prize money ==
Event	W	F	3rd	4th	QF	Round of 16	Round of 32	Round of 64
Singles	$14,000	$7,000	$3,800	$3,200	$1,750	$850	$425	$300
