= 1986 Virginia Slims of California =

- Date: February 24 – March 2
- Edition: 15th
- Draw: 28S / 15D
- Prize money: $150,000
- Surface: Carpet / indoor
- Location: Oakland, California, U.S.

Champions

Singles
- (United States) Chris Evert-Lloyd

Doubles
- (Czechoslovakia) Hana Mandlíková / (Australia) Wendy Turnbull
← 1985 ·	Stanford Classic	· 1987 →

The 1986 Virginia Slims of California was a women's tennis tournament played on indoor carpet courts in Oakland, California in the United States. It was part of the 1985 Virginia Slims World Championship Series (Note: The 1985 Virginia Slims World Championship Series ran from March 1985 through March 1986.) and was played from February 24 through March 2, 1986. Second-seeded Chris Evert-Lloyd won the singles title.

== Finals ==
=== Singles ===
(United States) Chris Evert-Lloyd defeated (United States) Kathy Jordan 6–2, 6–4

- It was Evert-Lloyd's 3rd singles title of the year and the 145th of her career.

=== Doubles ===
(Czechoslovakia) Hana Mandlíková / (Australia) Wendy Turnbull defeated (United States) Bonnie Gadusek / (Czechoslovakia) Helena Suková 7–6^{(7–5)}, 6–1
