= 1978 Wyler's Classic =

- Date: September 25 – October 1
- Edition: 3rd
- Category: Colgate Series (AAA)
- Draw: 32S / 16D
- Prize money: $100,000
- Surface: Carpet / indoor
- Location: Atlanta, United States
- Venue: Alexander Memorial Coliseum

Champions

Singles
- (United States) Chris Evert

Doubles
- (France) Françoise Dürr / (United Kingdom) Virginia Wade
← 1977 ·	WTA Atlanta	· 1979 →

The 1978 Wyler's Classic was a women's singles tennis tournament played on indoor carpet courts at the Alexander Memorial Coliseum in Atlanta, Georgia in the United States. The event was part of the AAA (Note: Tournaments with prize money for the women of at least $100,000.) category of the 1978 Colgate Series. It was the third edition of the tournament and was held from September 25 through October 1, 1978. Second-seeded Chris Evert won the singles title and earned $20,000 first-prize money.

== Finals ==
=== Singles ===
(United States) Chris Evert defeated (United States) Martina Navratilova 7–6^{(7–3)}, 0–6, 6–3

- It was Evert's 4th singles title of the year and the 82nd of her career.

=== Doubles ===
(France) Françoise Dürr / (United Kingdom) Virginia Wade defeated (United States) Martina Navratilova / (United States) Anne Smith 4–6, 6–2, 6–4

== Prize money ==
Event	W	F	SF	QF	Round of 16	Round of 32
Singles	$20,000	$10,000	$5,000	$2,600	$1,300	$700

== See also ==
- Evert–Navratilova rivalry
