= 1981 Lynda Carter Maybelline Classic =

- Date: October 12–18
- Edition: 2nd
- Category: Toyota Series (Cat 4)
- Draw: 32S / 16D
- Prize money: $125,000
- Surface: Hard / outdoor
- Location: Deerfield Beach, Florida, U.S.
- Venue: Deer Creek Racquet Club

Champions

Singles
- (United States) Chris Evert-Lloyd

Doubles
- (United States) Mary-Lou Daniels / (United States) Wendy White
- Maybelline Classic

The 1981 Lynda Carter Maybelline Classic was a women's tennis tournament played on outdoor hard courts at the Deer Creek Racquet Club in Deerfield Beach, Florida in the United States that was part of the Toyota Series of the 1981 Avon Championships World Championship Series. It was the second edition of the tournament and was held from October 12 through October 18, 1981. First-seeded Chris Evert-Lloyd won her second consecutive singles title at the event and earned $22,000 first-prize money.

== Finals ==
=== Singles ===
(United States) Chris Evert-Lloyd defeated (United States) Andrea Jaeger 4–6, 6–3, 6–0

- It was Evert-Lloyd's 8th singles title of the year and the 109th of her career.

=== Doubles ===
(United States) Mary-Lou Daniels / (United States) Wendy White defeated (United States) Pam Shriver / (United States) Paula Smith 6–1, 3–6, 7–5

- It was Daniels's and White's first doubles title of their careers.

== Prize money ==
| Event | W | F | SF | QF | Round of 16 | Round of 32 |
| Singles | $22,000 | $11,000 | $5,500 | $2,800 | $1,500 | $750 |
