= Michelle Torres =

American tennis player

- Country (sports): United States
- Born: June 27, 1967 (age 59) Chicago, Illinois, U.S.
- Turned pro: 1982
- Retired: 1989
- Plays: Right-handed (two-handed backhand)
- Prize money: US$ 263,216

Singles
- Career record: 93-111
- Career titles: 1
- Highest ranking: No. 18 (November 12, 1984)

Grand Slam singles results
- French Open: 3R (1984, 1986, 1987, 1988)
- Wimbledon: 2R (1983, 1984)
- US Open: 3R (1985, 1986, 1988)

Doubles
- Career record: 6-43
- Career titles: 0
- Highest ranking: No. 181 (November 9, 1987)

Michelle Torres (born June 27, 1967) is an American retired professional tennis player. She is also known as Michelle Casati.

== Career ==
At age 15 Torres played Wimbledon, the French and U.S. Opens. By 1984 she was ranked in the top 20 in the world. That year, at 17, she reached her only two finals on the WTA Tour, winning one at the Florida Federal Open over Carling Bassett and losing the other to Martina Navratilova at the Maybelline Classic.

== WTA Tour finals ==
=== Singles: 2 (1–1) ===
Winner — Legend Grand Slam tournaments (0–0) WTA Tour Championships (0–0) Virginia Slims (1–1)	Titles by surface Hard (1–1) Grass (0–0) Clay (0–0) Carpet (0–0)

Result	W/L	Date	Tournament	Surface	Opponent	Score
Loss	0–1	Sep 1984	Fort Lauderdale, Florida, US	Hard	(United States) Martina Navratilova	1–6, 0–6
Win	1–1	Oct 1984	Tampa, US	Hard	(Canada) Carling Bassett	6–1, 7–6^{(7–4)}
