= 1975 Virginia Slims of San Francisco =

- Date: January 6–11
- Edition: 5th
- Category: Virginia Slims Circuit
- Draw: 32S / 8D
- Prize money: $75,000
- Surface: Carpet (Sporteze) / indoor
- Location: San Francisco, United States
- Venue: Civic Auditorium
- Attendance: 30,000+

Champions

Singles
- (United States) Chris Evert

Doubles
- (United States) Chris Evert / (United States) Billie Jean King
← 1974 ·	Stanford Classic	· 1976 →

The 1975 Virginia Slims of San Francisco, was a women's tennis tournament that took place on indoor carpet courts at the Civic Auditorium in San Francisco in the United States. It was the fifth edition of the event, which was part of the Virginia Slims Circuit, and was held from January 6 through January 11, 1975. The final was watched by 6,346 spectators who saw first-seeded Chris Evert win the singles title, earning $15,000 first-prize money.

== Finals ==
=== Singles ===
(United States) Chris Evert defeated (United States) Billie Jean King 6–1, 6–1

- It was Evert's 1st singles title of the year and the 40th of her career.

=== Doubles ===
(United States) Chris Evert / (United States) Billie Jean King defeated (United States) Rosemary Casals / (United Kingdom) Virginia Wade 6–2, 7–5

== Prize money ==
Event	W	F	3rd	4th	QF	Round of 16	Round of 32
Singles	$15,000	$8,500	$4,600	$3,800	$2,100	$1,100	$550
