= 1985 Virginia Slims of California =

- Date: February 18 – 24
- Edition: 15th
- Draw: 28S / 16D
- Prize money: $150,000
- Surface: Carpet / indoor
- Location: Oakland, California, U.S.

Champions

Singles
- (Czechoslovakia) Hana Mandlíková

Doubles
- (Czechoslovakia) Hana Mandlíková / (Australia) Wendy Turnbull
← 1984 ·	Stanford Classic	· 1986 →

The 1985 Virginia Slims of California was a women's tennis tournament played on indoor carpet courts in Oakland, California, in the United States. It was part of the 1984 Virginia Slims World Championship Series (Note: The 1984 Virginia Slims World Championship Series ran from March 1984 through March 1985.) and was played from February 18 through February 24, 1985. Sixth-seeded Hana Mandlíková won the singles title.

== Finals ==
=== Singles ===
(Czechoslovakia) Hana Mandlíková defeated (United States) Chris Evert-Lloyd 6–2, 6–4

- It was Mandlíková's 1st singles title of the year and the 22nd of her career.

=== Doubles ===
(Czechoslovakia) Hana Mandlíková / (Australia) Wendy Turnbull defeated (South Africa) Rosalyn Fairbank / (United States) Candy Reynolds 4–6, 7–5 6–1
