= 1975 South African Open (tennis) =

- Date: 17–25 November
- Edition: 72nd
- Category: Grand Prix
- Draw: 64S
- Prize money: $150,000
- Surface: Hard / outdoor
- Location: Johannesburg, South Africa
- Venue: Ellis Park Tennis Stadium

Champions

Men's singles
- (United States) Harold Solomon

Women's singles
- (South Africa) Annette du Plooy

Men's doubles
- (South Africa) Bob Hewitt / (South Africa) Frew McMillan
- South African Open

The 1975 South African Open was a combined men's and women's tennis tournament played on outdoor hard courts in Johannesburg, South Africa. The men's events were part of the 1975 Commercial Union Assurance Grand Prix. It was the 72nd edition of the tournament and was held from 17 November through 25 November 1975. Harold Solomon and Annette du Plooy won the singles titles.

== Finals ==
=== Men's singles ===
(United States) Harold Solomon defeated (United States) Brian Gottfried 6–2, 6–4, 5–7, 6–1

=== Women's singles ===
(South Africa) Annette du Plooy defeated (South Africa) Brigitte Cuypers 6–3, 3–6, 6–4

=== Men's doubles ===
(South Africa) Bob Hewitt / (South Africa) Frew McMillan defeated (West Germany) Karl Meiler / (United States) Charlie Pasarell 7–5, 6–1
