= Virginia Slims of Sarasota =

Virginia Slims of Florida

Defunct tennis tournament
- Event name: First Federal of Sarasota Open (1974–75); Virginia Slims of Sarasota
- Tour: WTA Tour
- Founded: 1973
- Abolished: 1976
- Editions: 4
- Surface: Clay (1973– 74); Carpet (1975–76)

The Virginia Slims of Sarasota is a defunct WTA Tour affiliated tennis tournament played from 1973 to 1976 in Sarasota, Florida in the United States. It was held at the Bath & Racquet Club in 1973, at Palm Aire Racquet Club in 1974, and at the Robarts Sports Arena in 1975 and 1976. The tournament was played on outdoor clay courts in April 1973 and 1974 and on indoor carpet court in January 1975 and 1976.

Chris Evert was the most successful player at the tournament, winning the singles competition three times.

== Past finals ==
=== Singles ===
Year	Champions	Runners-up	Score
1973	(United States) Chris Evert	(Australia) Evonne Goolagong	6–3, 6–2
1974	(United States) Chris Evert	(Australia) Evonne Goolagong	6–4, 6–0
1975	(United States) Billie Jean King	(United States) Chris Evert	6–2, 6–3
1976	(United States) Chris Evert	(Australia) Evonne Goolagong Cawley	6–3, 6–0

=== Doubles ===
Year	Champions	Runners-up	Score
1973	(United States) Patti Hogan (United States) Sharon Walsh	(Czechoslovakia) Martina Navratilova (Czechoslovakia) Marie Neumannová	4–6, 6–0, 6–3
1974	(United States) Chris Evert (Australia) Evonne Goolagong	(United States) Tory Fretz (United States) Ceci Martinez	6–2, 6–2
1975	(United States) Chris Evert (United States) Billie Jean King	(Netherlands) Betty Stöve (United Kingdom) Virginia Wade	6–4, 6–2
1976	(United States) Martina Navratilova (Netherlands) Betty Stöve	(United States) Mona Guerrant (United States) Ann Kiyomura	6–1, 6–0
