= Robarts Arena =

Indoor arena in Sarasota, Florida, USA

Coordinates: 27.336°N 82.509°W

Robarts Arena is a multi-purpose indoor arena in Sarasota, Florida, located on the Sarasota County Fairgrounds. Built in 1967, it has a seating capacity of about 4,000. In 2011, Robarts Arena had undergone $500,000 in capital improvements.

The arena was the home venue for the Sarasota Stingers of the Continental Basketball Association from 1983 to 1985.

This arena was famously known for presenting Championship Wrestling from Florida professional wrestling shows. The last Championship Wrestling from Florida show was held at Robarts Arena on November 14, 1987 with NWA Western States Heritage champion Barry Windham battled Dory Funk Jr. in the main event to a 20-minute time-limit draw.
