= Maybelline Classic =

Defunct tennis tournament
- Event name: Maybelline Classic (1980–1982, 1984–1985); Lynda Carter Maybelline Classic (1983)
- Tour: WTA Tour
- Founded: 1980
- Abolished: 1985
- Editions: 6
- Location: Deerfield Beach, Florida (1980–1983); Fort Lauderdale, Florida (1984–1985)
- Surface: Hard / outdoors

The Maybelline Classic, also known as the Lynda Carter Maybelline Classic, is a defunct women's tennis tournament created by tennis promoter George Liddy which was first held in 1980 and played every year until 1985. It was held at the Deer Creek Racquet Club in Deerfield Beach, Florida (1980–1983) and at the Bonaventure Racquet Club in Fort Lauderdale, Florida (1984–1985), in the United States and played on outdoor hard courts.

== Results ==
=== Singles ===
| Year | Champions | Runners-up | Score |
|---|---|---|---|
| 1980 | (United States) Chris Evert-Lloyd | (United States) Andrea Jaeger | 6–4, 6–1 |
| 1981 | (United States) Chris Evert-Lloyd | (United States) Andrea Jaeger | 4–6, 6–3, 6–0 |
| 1982 | (United States) Chris Evert-Lloyd | (United States) Andrea Jaeger | 6–1, 6–1 |
| 1983 | (United States) Chris Evert-Lloyd | (United States) Bonnie Gadusek | 6–0, 6–4 |
| 1984 | (United States) Martina Navratilova | (United States) Michelle Torres | 6–1, 6–0 |
| 1985 | (United States) Martina Navratilova | (West Germany) Steffi Graf | 6–3, 6–1 |

=== Doubles ===
| Year | Champions | Runners-up | Score |
|---|---|---|---|
| 1980 | (United States) Andrea Jaeger (Czechoslovakia) Regina Maršíková | (United States) Martina Navratilova (United States) Candy Reynolds | 1–6, 6–1, 6–2 |
| 1981 | (United States) Mary-Lou Daniels (United States) Wendy White | (United States) Pam Shriver (United States) Paula Smith | 6–1, 3–6, 7–5 |
| 1982 | (United States) Barbara Potter (United States) Sharon Walsh | (United States) Rosie Casals (Australia) Wendy Turnbull | 7–6, 7–6 |
| 1983 | (United States) Bonnie Gadusek (United States) Wendy White | (United States) Pam Casale (United States) Mary-Lou Daniels | 6–1, 3–6, 6–3 |
| 1984 | (United States) Martina Navratilova (Australia) Elizabeth Smylie | (United States) Barbara Potter (United States) Sharon Walsh | 2–6 6–2, 6–3 |
| 1985 | (United States) Gigi Fernández (United States) Robin White | (South Africa) Rosalyn Fairbank (South Africa) Beverly Mould | 6–2, 7–5 |
