= Martina Navratilova career statistics =

Career finals
Discipline	Type	Won	Lost	Total	WR
Singles	Grand Slam	18	14	32	.56
Singles	Summer Olympics	–	–	–	–
Singles	Year-End Championships	8	6	14	.57
Singles	WTA Premier Mandatory*	–	–	–	–
Singles	WTA Tour	141	52	193	.73
Singles	Total	167	72	239	.70
Doubles	Grand Slam	31	6	37	.84
Doubles	Summer Olympics	–	–	–	–
Doubles	Year-End Championships	11	0	11	1.00
Doubles	WTA Premier Mandatory*	–	–	–	–
Doubles	WTA Tour	135	40	175	.77
Doubles	Total	177	46	223	.79
Mixed doubles	Grand Slam	10	6	16	.625
Mixed doubles	Total	10	6	16	.68
Total		354	126	480	.74
1) WR=winning rate 2) * formerly known as "Tier I" tournaments.

This is a list of the main career statistics of former Czechoslovak-born American tennis player Martina Navratilova.

== Significant finals ==
=== Grand Slam finals ===
==== Singles: 32 (18–14) ====
By winning the 1983 US Open title, Navratilova completed the Career Grand Slam. She became only the seventh female player in history to achieve this.

Result	Year	Championship	Surface	Opponent	Score
Loss	1975	Australian Open	Grass	(Australia) Evonne Goolagong	3–6, 2–6
Loss	1975	French Open	Clay	(United States) Chris Evert	6–2, 2–6, 1–6
Win	1978	Wimbledon (1)	Grass	(United States) Chris Evert	2–6, 6–4, 7–5
Win	1979	Wimbledon (2)	Grass	(United States) Chris Evert	6–4, 6–4
Loss	1981	US Open	Hard	(United States) Tracy Austin	6–1, 6–7^{(4–7)}, 6–7^{(1–7)}
Win	1981	Australian Open (1)	Grass	(United States) Chris Evert	6–7^{(4–7)}, 6–4, 7–5
Win	1982	French Open (1)	Clay	(United States) Andrea Jaeger	7–6^{(8–6)}, 6–1
Win	1982	Wimbledon (3)	Grass	(United States) Chris Evert	6–1, 3–6, 6–2
Loss	1982	Australian Open	Grass	(United States) Chris Evert	3–6, 6–2, 3–6
Win	1983	Wimbledon (4)	Grass	(United States) Andrea Jaeger	6–0, 6–3
Win	1983	US Open (1)	Hard	(United States) Chris Evert	6–1, 6–3
Win	1983	Australian Open (2)	Grass	(United States) Kathy Jordan	6–2, 7–6^{(7–5)}
Win	1984	French Open (2)	Clay	(United States) Chris Evert	6–3, 6–1
Win	1984	Wimbledon (5)	Grass	(United States) Chris Evert	7–6^{(7–5)}, 6–2
Win	1984	US Open (2)	Hard	(United States) Chris Evert	4–6, 6–4, 6–4
Loss	1985	French Open	Clay	(United States) Chris Evert	3–6, 7–6^{(7–4)}, 5–7
Win	1985	Wimbledon (6)	Grass	(United States) Chris Evert	4–6, 6–3, 6–2
Loss	1985	US Open	Hard	(Czechoslovakia) Hana Mandlíková	6–7^{(3–7)}, 6–1, 6–7^{(2–7)}
Win	1985	Australian Open (3)	Grass	(United States) Chris Evert	6–2, 4–6, 6–2
Loss	1986	French Open	Clay	(United States) Chris Evert	6–2, 3–6, 3–6
Win	1986	Wimbledon (7)	Grass	(Czechoslovakia) Hana Mandlíková	7–6^{(7–1)}, 6–3
Win	1986	US Open (3)	Hard	(Czechoslovakia) Helena Suková	6–3, 6–2
Loss	1987	Australian Open	Grass	(Czechoslovakia) Hana Mandlíková	5–7, 6–7^{(1–7)}
Loss	1987	French Open	Clay	(West Germany) Steffi Graf	4–6, 6–4, 6–8
Win	1987	Wimbledon (8)	Grass	(West Germany) Steffi Graf	7–5, 6–3
Win	1987	US Open (4)	Hard	(West Germany) Steffi Graf	7–6^{(7–4)}, 6–1
Loss	1988	Wimbledon	Grass	(West Germany) Steffi Graf	7–5, 2–6, 1–6
Loss	1989	Wimbledon	Grass	(West Germany) Steffi Graf	2–6, 7–6^{(7–1)}, 1–6
Loss	1989	US Open	Hard	(West Germany) Steffi Graf	6–3, 5–7, 1–6
Win	1990	Wimbledon (9)	Grass	(United States) Zina Garrison	6–4, 6–1
Loss	1991	US Open	Hard	(Socialist Federal Republic of Yugoslavia) Monica Seles	6–7^{(1–7)}, 1–6
Loss	1994	Wimbledon	Grass	(Spain) Conchita Martínez	4–6, 6–3, 3–6

==== Doubles: 37 (31–6) ====
By winning the 1980 Australian Open title, Navratilova completed the women's doubles Career Grand Slam. She became the ninth female player in history to achieve this.

Result	Year	Championship	Surface	Partner	Opponents	Score
Win	1975	French Open	Clay	(United States) Chris Evert	(United States) Julie Anthony (Soviet Union) Olga Morozova	6–3, 6–2
Win	1976	Wimbledon	Grass	(United States) Chris Evert	(United States) Billie Jean King (Netherlands) Betty Stöve	6–1, 3–6, 7–5
Loss	1977	Wimbledon	Grass	(Netherlands) Betty Stöve	(Australia) Helen Gourlay (United States) JoAnne Russell	3–6, 3–6
Win	1977	US Open	Clay	(Netherlands) Betty Stöve	(United States) Renée Richards (United States) Betty Ann Grubb Stuart	6–1, 7–6
Win	1978	US Open (2)	Hard	(United States) Billie Jean King	(Australia) Kerry Reid (Australia) Wendy Turnbull	7–6, 6–4
Win	1979	Wimbledon (2)	Grass	(United States) Billie Jean King	(Netherlands) Betty Stöve (Australia) Wendy Turnbull	5–7, 6–3, 6–2
Loss	1979	US Open	Hard	(United States) Billie Jean King	(Netherlands) Betty Stöve (Australia) Wendy Turnbull	4–6, 3–6
Win	1980	US Open (3)	Hard	(United States) Billie Jean King	(United States) Pam Shriver (Netherlands) Betty Stöve	7–6, 7–5
Win	1980	Australian Open	Grass	(United States) Betsy Nagelsen	(United States) Ann Kiyomura (United States) Candy Reynolds	6–4, 6–4
Win	1981	Wimbledon (3)	Grass	(United States) Pam Shriver	(United States) Kathy Jordan (United States) Anne Smith	6–3, 7–6^{(8–6)}
Loss	1981	Australian Open	Grass	(United States) Pam Shriver	(United States) Kathy Jordan (United States) Anne Smith	2–6, 5–7
Win	1982	French Open (2)	Clay	(United States) Anne Smith	(United States) Rosemary Casals (Australia) Wendy Turnbull	6–3, 6–4
Win	1982	Wimbledon (4)	Grass	(United States) Pam Shriver	(United States) Kathy Jordan (United States) Anne Smith	6–4, 6–1
Win	1982	Australian Open (2)	Grass	(United States) Pam Shriver	(West Germany) Claudia Kohde-Kilsch (West Germany) Eva Pfaff	6–4, 6–2
Win	1983	Wimbledon (5)	Grass	(United States) Pam Shriver	(United States) Rosemary Casals (Australia) Wendy Turnbull	6–2, 6–2
Win	1983	US Open (4)	Hard	(United States) Pam Shriver	(South Africa) Rosalyn Fairbank (United States) Candy Reynolds	6–7^{(4–7)}, 6–1, 6–3
Win	1983	Australian Open (3)	Grass	(United States) Pam Shriver	(United Kingdom) Anne Hobbs (Australia) Wendy Turnbull	6–4, 6–7, 6–2
Win	1984	French Open (3)	Clay	(United States) Pam Shriver	(West Germany) Claudia Kohde-Kilsch (Czechoslovakia) Hana Mandlíková	5–7, 6–3, 6–2
Win	1984	Wimbledon (6)	Grass	(United States) Pam Shriver	(United States) Kathy Jordan (United States) Anne Smith	6–3, 6–4
Win	1984	US Open (5)	Hard	(United States) Pam Shriver	(United Kingdom) Anne Hobbs (Australia) Wendy Turnbull	6–2, 6–4
Win	1984	Australian Open (4)	Grass	(United States) Pam Shriver	(West Germany) Claudia Kohde-Kilsch (Czechoslovakia) Helena Suková	6–3, 6–4
Win	1985	French Open (4)	Clay	(United States) Pam Shriver	(West Germany) Claudia Kohde-Kilsch (Czechoslovakia) Helena Suková	4–6, 6–2, 6–2
Loss	1985	Wimbledon	Grass	(United States) Pam Shriver	(United States) Kathy Jordan (Australia) Elizabeth Smylie	7–5, 3–6, 4–6
Loss	1985	US Open	Hard	(United States) Pam Shriver	(West Germany) Claudia Kohde-Kilsch (Czechoslovakia) Helena Suková	7–6, 2–6, 3–6
Win	1985	Australian Open (5)	Grass	(United States) Pam Shriver	(West Germany) Claudia Kohde-Kilsch (Czechoslovakia) Helena Suková	6–3, 6–4
Win	1986	French Open (5)	Clay	(Hungary) Andrea Temesvári	(West Germany) Steffi Graf (Argentina) Gabriela Sabatini	6–1, 6–2
Win	1986	Wimbledon (7)	Grass	(United States) Pam Shriver	(Czechoslovakia) Hana Mandlíková (Australia) Wendy Turnbull	6–1, 6–3
Win	1986	US Open (6)	Hard	(United States) Pam Shriver	(Czechoslovakia) Hana Mandlíková (Australia) Wendy Turnbull	6–4, 3–6, 6–3
Win	1987	Australian Open (6)	Grass	(United States) Pam Shriver	(United States) Zina Garrison (United States) Lori McNeil	6–1, 6–0
Win	1987	French Open (6)	Clay	(United States) Pam Shriver	(West Germany) Steffi Graf (Argentina) Gabriela Sabatini	6–2, 6–1
Win	1987	US Open (7)	Hard	(United States) Pam Shriver	(United States) Kathy Jordan (Australia) Elizabeth Smylie	5–7, 6–4, 6–2
Win	1988	Australian Open (7)	Hard	(United States) Pam Shriver	(United States) Chris Evert (Australia) Wendy Turnbull	6–0, 7–5
Win	1988	French Open (7)	Clay	(United States) Pam Shriver	(West Germany) Claudia Kohde-Kilsch (Czechoslovakia) Helena Suková	6–2, 7–5
Win	1989	Australian Open (8)	Hard	(United States) Pam Shriver	(United States) Patty Fendick (Canada) Jill Hetherington	3–6, 6–3, 6–2
Win	1989	US Open (8)	Hard	(Australia) Hana Mandlíková	(United States) Mary Joe Fernández (United States) Pam Shriver	5–7, 6–4, 6–4
Win	1990	US Open (9)	Hard	(United States) Gigi Fernández	(Czechoslovakia) Jana Novotná (Czechoslovakia) Helena Suková	6–2, 6–4
Loss	2003	US Open	Hard	(Russia) Svetlana Kuznetsova	(Spain) Virginia Ruano (Argentina) Paola Suárez	2–6, 3–6

==== Mixed doubles: 16 (10–6) ====
By winning the 2003 Australian Open title, Navratilova completed the mixed doubles Career Grand Slam. She became only the third female player in history to achieve this. Having also completed Career Grand Slams in singles and doubles, Navratilova completed the "Career Boxed Set", only the second player in the Open Era after Margaret Court to do so.

Result	Year	Championship	Partner	Opponents	Score
Win	1974	French Open (1)	(Colombia) Iván Molina	(France) Rosalia Reyes Darmon (Mexico) Marcelo Lara	6–3, 6–3
Win	1985	French Open (2)	(Switzerland) Heinz Günthardt	(United States) Paula Smith (Paraguay) Francisco González	2–6, 6–3, 6–2
Win	1985	Wimbledon (1)	(Australia) Paul McNamee	(Australia) Elizabeth Smylie (Australia) John Fitzgerald	7–5, 4–6, 6–2
Win	1985	US Open (1)	(Switzerland) Heinz Günthardt	(Australia) Elizabeth Smylie (Australia) John Fitzgerald	6–3, 6–4
Loss	1986	Wimbledon	(Switzerland) Heinz Günthardt	(United States) Kathy Jordan (United States) Ken Flach	3–6, 6–7^{(7–9)}
Loss	1986	US Open	(United States) Peter Fleming	(Italy) Raffaella Reggi (Spain) Sergio Casal	4–6, 4–6
Win	1987	US Open (2)	(Spain) Emilio Sánchez	(United States) Betsy Nagelsen (United States) Paul Annacone	6–4, 6–7^{(6–8)}, 7–6^{(14–12)}
Loss	1988	Australian Open	(United States) Tim Gullikson	(Czechoslovakia) Jana Novotná (United States) Jim Pugh	7–5, 2–6, 4–6
Win	1993	Wimbledon (2)	(Australia) Mark Woodforde	(Netherlands) Tom Nijssen (Netherlands) Manon Bollegraf	6–3, 6–4
Loss	1993	US Open	(Australia) Mark Woodforde	(Czech Republic) Helena Suková (Australia) Todd Woodbridge	3–6, 6–7^{(6–8)}
Win	1995	Wimbledon (3)	(United States) Jonathan Stark	(Czech Republic) Cyril Suk (United States) Gigi Fernández	6–4, 6–4
Win	2003	Australian Open (1)	(India) Leander Paes	(Greece) Eleni Daniilidou (Australia) Todd Woodbridge	6–4, 7–5
Win	2003	Wimbledon (4)	(India) Leander Paes	(Russia) Anastassia Rodionova (Israel) Andy Ram	6–3, 6–3
Loss	2004	Australian Open	(India) Leander Paes	(Russia) Elena Bovina (Serbia and Montenegro) Nenad Zimonjić	1–6, 6–7^{(3–7)}
Loss	2005	French Open	(India) Leander Paes	(Slovakia) Daniela Hantuchová (France) Fabrice Santoro	6–3, 3–6, 2–6
Win	2006	US Open (3)	(United States) Bob Bryan	(Czech Republic) Květa Peschke (Czech Republic) Martin Damm	6–2, 6–3

=== Year-End Championships finals ===
==== Singles: 14 (8–6) ====
Result	Year	Location	Opponent	Score
Loss	1975	Los Angeles	(United States) Chris Evert	4–6, 2–6
Win	1978	Oakland	(Australia) Evonne Goolagong	7–6^{(7–0)}, 6–4
Win	1979	New York City	(United States) Tracy Austin	6–3, 3–6, 6–2
Loss	1980	New York City	(United States) Tracy Austin	2–6, 6–2, 2–6
Win	1981	New York City	(United States) Andrea Jaeger	6–3, 7–6^{(7–3)}
Loss	1982	New York City	(West Germany) Sylvia Hanika	6–1, 3–6, 4–6
Win	1983	New York City	(United States) Chris Evert	6–2, 6–0
Win	1984	New York City	(United States) Chris Evert	6–3, 7–5, 6–1
Win	1985	New York City	(Czechoslovakia) Helena Suková	6–3, 7–5, 6–4
Win	1986 (Mar.)	New York City	(Czechoslovakia) Hana Mandlíková	6–2, 6–0, 3–6, 6–1
Win	1986 (Nov.)	New York City	(West Germany) Steffi Graf	7–6^{(8–6)}, 6–3, 6–2
Loss	1989	New York City	(West Germany) Steffi Graf	4–6, 5–7, 6–2, 2–6
Loss	1991	New York City	(Socialist Federal Republic of Yugoslavia) Monica Seleš	4–6, 6–3, 5–7, 0–6
Loss	1992	New York City	(Federal Republic of Yugoslavia) Monica Seleš	5–7, 3–6, 1–6

==== Doubles: 13 (13–0) ====
Result	Year	Location	Partner	Opponents	Score
Win	1980	New York City	(United States) Billie Jean King	(United States) Rosemary Casals (Australia) Wendy Turnbull	6–3, 4–6, 6–3
Win	1981	New York City	(United States) Pam Shriver	(United States) Barbara Potter (United States) Sharon Walsh	6–0, 7–6^{(8–6)}
Win	1982	New York City	(United States) Pam Shriver	(United States) Kathy Jordan (United States) Anne Smith	6–4, 6–3
Win	1983	New York City	(United States) Pam Shriver	(West Germany) Claudia Kohde-Kilsch (West Germany) Eva Pfaff	7–5, 6–2
Win	1984	New York City	(United States) Pam Shriver	(United Kingdom) Jo Durie (United States) Ann Kiyomura	6–3, 6–1
Win	1985	New York City	(United States) Pam Shriver	(West Germany) Claudia Kohde-Kilsch (Czechoslovakia) Helena Suková	6–7^{(4–7)}, 6–4, 7–6^{(7–5)}
Win	1986 (Nov)	New York City	(United States) Pam Shriver	(West Germany) Claudia Kohde-Kilsch (Czechoslovakia) Helena Suková	7–6^{(7–1)}, 6–3
Win	1987	New York City	(United States) Pam Shriver	(West Germany) Claudia Kohde-Kilsch (Czechoslovakia) Helena Suková	6–1, 6–1
Win	1988	New York City	(United States) Pam Shriver	(Soviet Union) Larisa Savchenko Neiland (Soviet Union) Natalia Zvereva	6–3, 6–4
Win	1989	New York City	(United States) Pam Shriver	(Soviet Union) Larisa Savchenko Neiland (Soviet Union) Natalia Zvereva	6–3, 6–2
Win	1991	New York City	(United States) Pam Shriver	(United States) Gigi Fernández (Czechoslovakia) Jana Novotná	4–6, 7–5, 6–4

== Singles performance timelines ==
=== Grand Slam tournaments ===
Key
W	F	SF	QF	#R	RR	Q#	DNQ	A	NH

(W) winner; (F) finalist; (SF) semifinalist; (QF) quarterfinalist; (#R) rounds 4, 3, 2, 1; (RR) round-robin stage; (Q#) qualification round; (DNQ) did not qualify; (A) absent; (NH) not held; (SR) strike rate (events won / competed); (W–L) win–loss record.

	Czechoslovakia			United States																							
Tournament	1973	1974	1975	1976	1977		1978	1979	1980	1981	1982	1983	1984	1985	1986	1987	1988	1989	1990	1991	1992	1993	1994	1995–2003	2004	SR	W–L
Australian Open	A	A	F	A	A	A	A	A	SF	W	F	W	SF	W	–	F	SF	QF	A	A	A	A	A	A	A	3 / 10	46–7
French Open	QF	QF	F	A	A		A	A	A	QF	W	4R	W	F	F	F	4R	A	A	A	A	A	1R	A	1R	2 / 13	51–11
Wimbledon	3R	1R	QF	SF	QF		W	W	SF	SF	W	W	W	W	W	W	F	F	W	QF	SF	SF	F	A	2R	9 / 23	120–14
US Open	1R	3R	SF	1R	SF		SF	SF	4R	F	QF	W	W	F	W	W	QF	F	4R	F	2R	4R	A	A	A	4 / 21	89–17
SR	0 / 3	0 / 3	0 / 4	0 / 2	0 / 2		1 / 2	1 / 2	0 / 3	1 / 4	2 / 4	3 / 4	3 / 4	2 / 4	2 / 3	2 / 4	0 / 4	0 / 3	1 / 2	0 / 2	0 / 2	0 / 2	0 / 2	0 / 0	0 / 2	18 / 67	–
Win–loss	5–3	5–3	17–4	5–2	9–2		11–1	11–1	11–3	19–3	20–2	23–1	25–1	25–2	20–1	25–2	18–4	16–3	10–1	10–2	6–2	8–2	6–2	0–0	1–2	–	306–49
Year End Rank		9*	3	4	3		2	1	3	3	1	1	1	1	1	2	2	2	3	4	5	3	8		376		

Note: Australian Open was held twice in 1977, in January and December, and was not held in 1986.

- * World Rank before the 1975 inception of WTA rankings.

==== See also ====
- Performance timelines for all female tennis players since 1978 who reached at least one Grand Slam final

=== Other tournaments ===
Key
W	F	SF	QF	#R	RR	Q#	DNQ	A	NH

(W) winner; (F) finalist; (SF) semifinalist; (QF) quarterfinalist; (#R) rounds 4, 3, 2, 1; (RR) round-robin stage; (Q#) qualification round; (DNQ) did not qualify; (A) absent; (NH) not held; (SR) strike rate (events won / competed); (W–L) win–loss record.

	Czechoslovakia			United States																										
Tournament	1973	1974	1975	1976	1977	1978	1979	1980	1981	1982	1983	1984	1985	1986		1987	1988	1989	1990	1991	1992	1993	1994	1995–2001	2002	2003	2004	2005	SR	W–L
WTA Finals	A	QF	F	SF	SF	W	W	F	W	F	W	W	W	W	W	QF	QF	F	A	F	F	QF	1R	A					8 / 21	60–13
Toyota Championships	–				RR	F	W	SF	F	W	–																		2 / 6	15–4
Chicago	A	2R	F	SF	A	W	W	W	W	W	W	A		W		W	W	QF	W	W	W	F	QF	A					12 / 18	69–6
Eastbourne	A	SF	2R	SF	A	W	F	3R	SF	W	W	W	W	W		F	W	W	W	W	2R	W	QF	A	2R	A	Q2	A	11 / 22	95–11
Washington, D.C.	A	2R	W	A	W	W	F	A		W	W	A	W	W		A	W	A	W	–									9 / 11	49–2
Dallas	1R	2R	F	F	1R	QF	W	W	W	W	W	A	W	W		A	W	W	–										9 / 15	56–6
Los Angeles	A	–			F	W	F	W	W	A	W	A		W		SF	A	W	F	A	W	W	3R	A					8 / 13	55–5
Houston	–			W	W	W	W	F	A		W	A	W	A		F	F	A	SF	A			2R	A	–				6 / 11	43–5
Filderstadt	–					A	F	A	F	W	W	A		W		W	W	A		F	W	QF	QF	A					6 / 11	45–5
Boston	1R	–	W	A	–	SF	A						–	W	W	A	W	W	A	–									5 / 7	28–2
Sydney	A	2R	A	W	A			QF	F	W	A	W	W	A		A		W	A										5 / 8	31–3
Oakland / San Francisco	A	1R	SF	QF	A		W	W	1R	A		F	A	SF		A	W	SF	F	W	F	W	F	A					5 / 15	46–10
Orlando	–	W	F	–				W	W	W	W	W	W	A		–													4 / 5	33–0
Canadian Open	SF	A						3R	SF	W	W	A	QF	A		A	QF	W	A										3 / 8	25–5
Charleston	A		F	2R	A	QF	SF	A		W	W	A					W	SF	W	QF	3R	A	2R	A			1R	A	4 / 13	37–9
Amelia Island	–							W	F	A		W	A				W	SF	A				SF	A			1R	A	3 / 7	25–4
US Indoor	1R	1R	A	3R	–	A	SF	A	W	A		W	SF	W		A	–												3 / 8	22–5
Indian Wells	–																	A	W	W	A								2 / 2	10–0
Paris Indoor	–																					W	W	A					2 / 2	10–0
Richmond	A	–					W	W	A				–																2 / 2	10–0
Tournament	1973	1974	1975	1976	1977	1978	1979	1980	1981	1982	1983	1984	1985	1986		1987	1988	1989	1990	1991	1992	1993	1994	1995–01	2002	2003	2004	2005	SR	W–L
Brighton	–					A	W	F	A	W	A														–				2 / 3	14–1
Seattle	–				F	W	A			W	–																		2 / 3	14–1
Tampa area	SF	A	–		A	QF	A		W	A	W	A								–									2 / 4	15–2
Tokyo (Pan Pacific)	–			F	A													W	A	F	F	W	F	A					2 / 6	22–4
Phoenix	A		SF	SF	SF	W	W	A	–					A						–									2 / 5	19–3
Detroit	A	2R	SF	A	W	W	SF	A				–																	2 / 5	17–3
Birmingham	A	–			A		QF	A	SF	A								W	A	W	A	QF	A						2 / 5	16–3
US Hard Court	–																A				W	A	–			A			1 / 1	4–0
Miami	–												W	A		SF	A												1 / 2	12–1
Charlotte	SF	–			W	–																							1 / 2	8–1
Newport	A	3R	–								A	W	A							–									1 / 2	7–1
Denver	A	2R	W	–								A		–						A	–								1 / 2	6–1
Atlanta	–		F	–	QF	F	W	A				–																	1 / 4	15–3
Tokyo (Gunze / Borden)	A		SF	SF	F	F	W	W	A				–																2 / 6	12–4
Philadelphia	–		SF	A	F	–														A				–		A			0 / 2	7–2
Fort Lauderdale	QF	1R	–									W	W	–															2 / 4	14–2
Zürich	–											A									F	F	QF	A					0 / 3	10–3
German Open	2R	F	A					–	A					F		A													0 / 3	9–3
Akron	1R	QF	QF	A	–																								0 / 3	4–3
Sarasota	1R	A	2R	SF	–																				A		–		0 / 3	4–3
Mission Viejo	–	1R	SF	–																									0 / 3	3–2
Italian Open	2R	F	F	A										–		SF	A		F	QF	A	QF	F	A					0 / 8	24–8
Cincinnati	–							A	W	A	–																		1 / 1	5–0
Tokyo	–																		QF	A				–					0 / 1	1–1
Kansas	–					W	–	W	F	W	A	–		A					–										3 / 4	18–1

== Career singles statistics ==
Year	Tournaments	Titles	Hardcourt W–L	Clay W–L	Grass W–L	Carpet W–L	Overall W–L	Win %	Year End Ranking
1973	16	0	0–0	17–9	2–2	4–5	23–16	59.0%	N/A
1974	20	1	0–0	16–6	8–4	7–9	31–19	62.0%	N/A
1975	24	4	15–3	31–7	9–3	31–8	86–21	80.4%	3
1976	17	2	4–3	1–3	9–2	25–7	39–15	72.2%	4
1977	21	6	9–6	10–1	7–2	37–8	63–17	78.8%	3
1978	20	11	18–4	2–1	13–0	47–4	80–9	89.9%	2
1979	23	10	18–4	3–1	14–2	60–6	88–12	88.0%	1
1980	24	11	27–6	5–0	12–4	40–5	84–15	85.7%	3
1981	23	10	18–2	7–2	21–4	42–4	88–12	88.0%	3
1982	18	15	14–1	15–0	21–1	40–1	90–3	96.8%	1
1983	17	16	22–0	12–1	19–0	33–0	86–1	98.9%	1
1984	15	13	21–0	16–0	27–1	18–1	78–2	97.5%	1
1985	17	12	19–3	19–1	29–0	17–1	84–5	94.4%	1
1986	17	14	12–0	15–2	13–0	49–1	89–3	96.7%	1
1987	12	4	15–2	13–3	17–2	11–1	56–8	87.5%	2
1988	16	9	11–3	17–2	12–1	30–1	70–7	90.9%	2
1989	16	8	30–2	6–2	17–1	20–3	73–7	91.3%	2
1990	13	6	12–2	14–3	13–0	13–2	52–7	88.1%	3
1991	14	5	11–1	6–3	15–1	21–4	53–9	85.5%	4
1992	12	4	9–1	1–1	6–2	22–4	38–8	82.6%	5
1993	13	5	10–2	2–1	12–2	22–3	46–8	85.2%	3
1994	15	1	3–2	7–5	8–2	15–5	33–14	70.2%	8
2002	1	0	0–0	0–0	1–1	0–0	1–1	50.0%	NR
2003	0	0	0–0	0–0	0–0	0–0	0–0	00.0%	NR
2004	5	0	0–0	0–3	2–2	0–0	2–5	28.6%	376
2005	1	0	0–0	0–0	0–1	0–0	0–1	00.0%	NR
Career	390	167	298–47	235–57	307–40	604–83	1444–227	86.4%	N/A

- Navratilova did not play an official WTA tour singles match from 1995 through 2001.

== Doubles performance timeline ==
Key
W	F	SF	QF	#R	RR	Q#	DNQ	A	NH

(W) winner; (F) finalist; (SF) semifinalist; (QF) quarterfinalist; (#R) rounds 4, 3, 2, 1; (RR) round-robin stage; (Q#) qualification round; (DNQ) did not qualify; (A) absent; (NH) not held; (SR) strike rate (events won / competed); (W–L) win–loss record.

=== Grand Slam doubles ===
	Czechoslovakia			United States																													
Tournament	1973	1974	1975	1976	1977		1978	1979	1980	1981	1982	1983	1984	1985	1986	1987	1988	1989	1990	1991	1992	1993	1994	1995	1996–99	2000	2001	2002	2003	2004	2005	2006	SR
Australian Open	A	A	1R	A	A	A	A	A	W	F	W	W	W	W	–	W	W	W	A	A	A	A	A	A	A	A	A	A	3R	2R	QF	A	8 / 13
French Open	QF	SF	W	A	A		A	A	A	SF	W	A	W	W	W	W	W	A	A	A	A	A	3R	A	A	3R	1R	1R	3R	SF	1R	2R	7 / 18
Wimbledon	1R	1R	QF	W	F		QF	W	SF	W	W	W	W	F	W	QF	3R	SF	QF	SF	SF	A	SF	A	A	QF	QF	2R	QF	SF	SF	QF	7 / 28
US Open	2R	QF	SF	A	W		W	F	W	SF	SF	W	W	F	W	W	SF	W	W	3R	SF	A	A	2R	A	3R	QF	3R	F	QF	SF	QF	9 / 27
WR	0 / 3	0 / 3	1 / 4	1 / 1	1 / 2		1 / 2	1 / 2	2 / 3	1 / 4	3 / 4	3 / 3	4 / 4	2 / 4	3 / 3	3 / 4	2 / 4	2 / 3	1 / 2	0 / 2	0 / 2	0 / 0	0 / 2	0 / 1	0 / 0	0 / 3	0 / 3	0 / 3	0 / 4	0 / 4	0 / 4	0 / 3	31 / 86

=== Grand Slam mixed doubles ===
	Czechoslovakia			United States																							
Tournament	1973	1974	1975	1976	1977	1978	1979	1980–83	1984	1985	1986	1987	1988	1989–92	1993	1994	1995	1996	1997–99	2000	2001	2002	2003	2004	2005	2006	SR
Australian Open	NH	NH	NH	NH	NH	NH	NH	NH	NH	NH	NH	SF	F	A	A	A	A	A	A	A	A	A	W	F	SF	A	1 / 5
French Open	A	W	A	A	A	A	A	A	A	W	QF	QF	SF	A	A	3R	A	A	A	2R	2R	A	2R	2R	F	SF	2 / 12
Wimbledon	QF	3R	SF	2R	SF	A	A	A	QF	W	F	A	QF	A	W	A	W	QF	A	1R	2R	2R	W	3R	QF	3R	4 / 19
US Open	A	2R	A	A	A	A	SF	A	A	W	F	W	A	A	F	A	QF	A	A	2R	1R	2R	A	SF	QF	W	3 / 13
WR	0 / 1	1 / 3	0 / 1	0 / 1	0 / 1	0 / 0	0 / 1	0 / 0	0 / 1	3 / 3	0 / 3	1 / 3	0 / 3	0 / 0	1 / 2	0 / 1	1 / 2	0 / 1	0 / 0	0 / 3	0 / 3	0 / 2	2 / 3	0 / 4	0 / 4	1 / 3	10 / 49

Note: The Australian Open was held twice in 1977, in January and December, and was not held in 1986.

== WTA singles finals ==
=== Finals: 239 (167 titles, 72 runner-ups) ===
Legend (singles) Grand Slam Titles (18) WTA Championships (8) Series Championships (2)	Titles by surface Hard (29) Clay (18) Grass (32) Carpet (i) (88)

Result	W–L	Date	Tournament	Surface	Opponent	Score
Loss	0–1	May 1974	German Open, Hamburg	Clay	(West Germany) Helga Niessen Masthoff	6–4, 5–7, 6–3
Loss	0–2	May 1974	Italian Open, Rome	Clay	(United States) Chris Evert	6–3, 6–3
Win	1–2	Sep 1974	Barnett Bank Classic, Orlando, Florida, U.S.	Clay	(United States) Julie Heldman	7–6^{(5–4)}, 6–4
Loss	1–3	Dec 1974	Australian Open, Melbourne	Grass	(Australia) Evonne Goolagong	6–3, 6–2
Win	2–3	Jan 1975	Virginia Slims of Washington, Washington, D.C.	Carpet (i)	(Australia) Kerry Melville	6–3, 6–1
Loss	2–4	Feb 1975	Virginia Slims of Chicago	Carpet (i)	(Australia) Margaret Court	6–3, 3–6, 6–2
Win	3–4	Mar 1975	Virginia Slims of Boston, U.S.	Carpet (i)	(Australia) Evonne Goolagong	6–2, 4–6, 6–3
Loss	3–5	Mar 1975	Virginia Slims of Dallas, U.S.	Carpet (i)	(United Kingdom) Virginia Wade	2–6, 7–6, 4–3 ret.
Loss	3–6	Mar 1975	Virginia Slims Championships, Los Angeles	Carpet (i)	(United States) Chris Evert	6–4, 6–2
Loss	3–7	Apr 1975	Family Circle Cup, Amelia Island, Florida, U.S.	Clay	(United States) Chris Evert	7–5, 6–4
Walkover	3–8	May 1975	Barnett Bank Classic, Orlando, Florida, U.S.	Clay	(United States) Chris Evert	walkover
Loss	3–9	May 1975	Italian Open, Rome	Clay	(United States) Chris Evert	6–1, 6–0
Loss	3–10	Jun 1975	French Open, Paris	Clay	(United States) Chris Evert	2–6, 6–2, 6–1
Win	4–10	Sep 1975	Four Roses Classic, Charlotte, North Carolina, U.S.	Clay	(Australia) Evonne Goolagong	4–6, 6–2, 7–5
Loss	4–11	Sep 1975	Little Mo Classic, Atlanta, U.S.	Carpet (i)	(United States) Chris Evert	2–6, 6–2, 6–0
Win	5–11	Sep 1975	Majestic International, Denver, Colorado, U.S.	Hard (i)	(United States) Carrie Meyer	4–6, 6–4, 6–3
Win	6–11	Jan 1976	Virginia Slims of Houston, U.S.	Carpet (i)	(United States) Chris Evert	6–3, 6–4
Loss	6–12	Mar 1976	Virginia Slims of Dallas, U.S.	Carpet (i)	(Australia) Evonne Goolagong	6–1, 6–1
Win	7–12	Dec 1976	Colgate New South Wales Tournament, Sydney	Grass	(Netherlands) Betty Stöve	7–5, 6–2
Win	8–12	Jan 1977	Virginia Slims of Washington, Washington, D.C. (2)	Carpet (i)	(United States) Chris Evert	6–2, 6–3
Win	9–12	Jan 1977	Virginia Slims of Houston, U.S. (2)	Carpet (i)	(United Kingdom) Sue Barker	7–6, 7–5
Win	10–12	Jan 1977	U.S. Indoor Championships, Minneapolis, Minnesota, U.S.	Carpet (i)	(United Kingdom) Sue Barker	6–0, 6–1
Loss	10–13	Feb 1977	Virginia Slims of Seattle, Seattle, Washington, U.S.	Carpet (i)	(United States) Chris Evert	6–2, 6–4
Loss	10–14	Feb 1977	Virginia Slims of Los Angeles	Carpet (i)	(United States) Chris Evert	6–2, 2–6, 6–1
Win	11–14	Feb 1977	Virginia Slims of Detroit, U.S.	Carpet (i)	(United Kingdom) Sue Barker	6–4, 6–4
Loss	11–15	Mar 1977	Virginia Slims of Philadelphia, U.S.	Carpet (i)	(United States) Chris Evert	6–4, 4–6, 6–3
Loss	11–16	Apr 1977	L'Eggs World Series, Tucson, Arizona, U.S.	Hard	(United States) Chris Evert	6–3, 7–6
Win	12–16	Jun 1977	McIntosh Scottish Championships, Edinburgh, United Kingdom	Grass	(United States) Kristien Kemmer-Shaw	2–6, 9–8, 7–5
Win	13–16	Aug 1977	Ivey's Pepsi Tennis Classic, Charlotte, North Carolina, U.S. (2)	Clay	(Socialist Federal Republic of Yugoslavia) Mima Jaušovec	3–6, 6–2, 6–1
Loss	13–17	Sep 1977	Toray Open, Osaka, Japan	Carpet (i)	(United Kingdom) Virginia Wade	5–7, 7–5, 6–4
Win	14–17	Jan 1978	Virginia Slims of Washington, Washington, D.C. (3)	Carpet (i)	(Netherlands) Betty Stöve	7–5, 6–4
Win	15–17	Jan 1978	Virginia Slims of Houston, U.S. (3)	Carpet (i)	(United States) Billie Jean King	1–6, 6–2, 6–2
Win	16–17	Jan 1978	Virginia Slims of Los Angeles	Hard (i)	(United States) Rosemary Casals	6–3, 6–2
Win	17–17	Jan 1978	Virginia Slims of Chicago	Carpet (i)	(Australia) Evonne Goolagong	6–7^{(4–5)}, 6–2, 6–2
Win	18–17	Feb 1978	Virginia Slims of Seattle, Seattle, Washington, U.S.	Carpet (i)	(Netherlands) Betty Stöve	6–1, 1–6, 6–1
Win	19–17	Feb 1978	Virginia Slims of Detroit, U.S. (2)	Carpet (i)	(Australia) Dianne Fromholtz	6–3, 6–2
Win	20–17	Feb 1978	Virginia Slims of Kansas City, U.S.	Hard (i)	(United States) Billie Jean King	7–5, 2–6, 6–3
Win	21–17	Mar 1978	Virginia Slims Championships, Oakland, California, U.S.(1)	Carpet (i)	(Australia) Evonne Goolagong	7–6^{(7–0)}, 6–4
Win	22–17	Jun 1978	Colgate International, Eastbourne, United Kingdom	Grass	(United States) Chris Evert	6–4, 4–6, 9–7
Win	23–17	Jun 1978	Wimbledon, London	Grass	(United States) Chris Evert	2–6, 6–4, 7–5
Win	24–17	Oct 1978	Thunderbird Classic, Phoenix, Arizona, U.S.	Hard	(United States) Tracy Austin	6–4, 6–2
Loss	24–18	Sep 1978	Wyler's Women's Classic, Atlanta, U.S.	Carpet (i)	(United States) Chris Evert	7–6, 0–6, 6–3
Loss	24–19	Nov 1978	Colgate Series Championships, Palm Springs, U.S.	Hard	(United States) Chris Evert	6–3, 6–3
Loss	24–20	Nov 1978	Gunze World Tennis Open, Tokyo	Carpet (i)	(United States) Tracy Austin	6–1, 6–1
Loss	24–21	Dec 1978	Tokyo Invitational, Tokyo	Carpet (i)	(United States) Chris Evert	7–5, 6–2
Loss	24–22	Jan 1979	Avon Championships of Washington, Washington, D.C.	Carpet (i)	(United States) Tracy Austin	6–3, 6–2
Win	25–22	Jan 1979	Avon Championships of California, Oakland, California, U.S.	Carpet (i)	(United States) Chris Evert	7–5, 7–5
Win	26–22	Jan 1979	Avon Championships of Houston, U.S. (4)	Carpet (i)	(United Kingdom) Virginia Wade	6–3, 6–2
Win	27–22	Jan 1979	Avon Championships of Chicago (2)	Carpet (i)	(United States) Tracy Austin	6–3, 6–4
Loss	27–23	Feb 1979	Avon Championships of Los Angeles, U.S.	Carpet (i)	(United States) Chris Evert	6–3, 6–4
Win	28–23	Feb 1979	Avon Championships of Dallas, U.S.	Carpet (i)	(United States) Chris Evert	6–4, 6–4
Win	29–23	Mar 1979	The Avon Championships, New York City (2)	Carpet (i)	(United States) Tracy Austin	6–3, 3–6, 6–2
Loss	29–24	Jun 1979	Eastbourne International, Eastbourne, United Kingdom	Grass	(United States) Chris Evert	7–5, 5–7, 13–11
Win	30–24	Jun 1979	Wimbledon, London (2)	Grass	(United States) Chris Evert	6–4, 6–4
Loss	30–25	Jul 1979	Wells Fargo Open, San Diego, California, U.S.	Hard	(United States) Tracy Austin	6–4, 6–2
Win	31–25	Aug 1979	Central Fidelity Banks International, U.S.	Carpet (i)	(United States) Kathy Jordan	6–1, 6–3
Win	32–25	Sep 1979	Davison's Tennis Classic, Atlanta, U.S.	Carpet (i)	(Australia) Wendy Turnbull	7–6^{(8–6)}, 6–4
Win	33–25	Oct 1979	Thunderbird Classic, Phoenix, Arizona, U.S. (2)	Hard	(United States) Chris Evert	6–1, 6–3
Loss	33–26	Nov 1979	Porsche Tennis Grand Prix, Filderstadt, Germany	Carpet (i)	(United States) Tracy Austin	6–2, 6–0
Win	34–26	Nov 1979	Daihatsu Challenge, Brighton, United Kingdom	Carpet (i)	(United States) Chris Evert	6–3, 6–3
Loss	34–27	Dec 1979	Emeron Cup, Tokyo	Carpet (i)	(United States) Tracy Austin	6–2, 6–1
Win	35–27	Jan 1980	Colgate Series Championships, Landover, Maryland, U.S.	Carpet (i)	(United States) Tracy Austin	6–2, 6–1
Win	36–27	Jan 1980	Avon Championships of Kansas City, U.S. (2)	Carpet (i)	(South Africa) Greer Stevens	6–0, 6–2
Win	37–27	Jan 1980	Avon Championships of Chicago (3)	Carpet (i)	(United States) Chris Evert	6–4, 6–4
Win	38–27	Feb 1980	Avon Championships of Los Angeles (2)	Carpet (i)	(United States) Tracy Austin	6–2, 6–0
Win	39–27	Feb 1980	Avon Championships of California, Oakland, California, U.S. (2)	Carpet (i)	(Australia) Evonne Goolagong	6–1, 7–6^{(7–4)}
Loss	39–28	Feb 1980	Avon Championships of Houston, U.S.	Carpet (i)	(United States) Billie Jean King	6–1, 6–3
Win	40–28	Mar 1980	Avon Championships of Dallas, U.S. (2)	Carpet (i)	(Australia) Evonne Goolagong	6–3, 6–2
Loss	40–29	Mar 1980	The Avon Championships, New York City	Carpet (i)	(United States) Tracy Austin	6–2, 2–6, 6–2
Loss	40–30	Mar 1980	Clairol Crowns, La Costa, California, U.S.	Hard	(United States) Tracy Austin	7–5, 6–2
Win	41–30	Apr 1980	Murjani WTA Championships, Amelia Island, Florida, U.S.	Clay	(Czechoslovakia) Hana Mandlíková	5–7, 6–3, 6–2
Win	42–30	Apr 1980	United Airlines Tournament, Orlando, Florida, U.S. (2)	Clay	(United States) Tracy Austin	6–2, 6–4
Win	43–30	Jul 1980	Player's Classic, Montreal, Canada	Hard	(South Africa) Greer Stevens	6–2, 6–1
Win	44–30	Jul 1980	Central Fidelity Bank International, Richmond, Virginia, U.S. (2)	Carpet (i)	(United States) Mary Lou Daniels Piatek	6–3, 6–0
Loss	44–31	Oct 1980	Daihatsu Challenge, Brighton, United Kingdom	Carpet (i)	(United States) Chris Evert	6–4, 5–7, 6–3
Win	45–31	Nov 1980	Lion's Cup, Tokyo	Carpet (i)	(United States) Tracy Austin	6–4, 6–3
Loss	45–32	Jan 1981	Avon Championships of Kansas City, U.S.	Carpet (i)	(United States) Andrea Jaeger	3–6, 6–3, 7–5
Win	46–32	Jan 1981	Avon Championships of Cincinnati, U.S.	Carpet (i)	(West Germany) Sylvia Hanika	6–2, 6–4
Win	47–32	Jan 1981	Avon Championships of Chicago (4)	Carpet (i)	(Czechoslovakia) Hana Mandlíková	6–4, 6–2
Win	48–32	Mar 1981	Avon Championships of Los Angeles (3)	Carpet (i)	(United States) Andrea Jaeger	6–4, 6–0
Win	49–32	Mar 1981	Avon Championships of Dallas, U.S. (3)	Carpet (i)	(United States) Pam Shriver	6–2, 6–4
Win	50–32	Mar 1981	The Avon Championships, New York City (3)	Carpet (i)	(United States) Andrea Jaeger	6–3, 7–6^{(7–3)}
Loss	50–33	Apr 1981	Murjani WITA Championships, Amelia Island, Florida, U.S.	Clay	(United States) Chris Evert	6–0, 6–0
Win	51–33	Apr 1981	United Airlines Tournament, Orlando, Florida, U.S. (3)	Clay	(United States) Andrea Jaeger	7–5, 6–3
Loss	51–34	Sep 1981	US Open, New York City	Hard	(United States) Tracy Austin	1–6, 7–6^{(7–4)}, 7–6^{(7–1)}
Win	52–34	Sep 1981	Playtex US Indoor Championships, Minneapolis, U.S. (2)	Carpet (i)	(United States) Tracy Austin	6–0, 6–2
Win	53–34	Oct 1981	Florida Federal Open, U.S.	Hard	(West Germany) Bettina Bunge	5–7, 6–2, 6–0
Loss	53–35	Oct 1981	Porsche Tennis Grand Prix, Filderstadt, Germany	Carpet (i)	(United States) Tracy Austin	4–6, 6–3, 6–4
Win	54–35	Nov 1981	Lion's Cup, Tokyo (2)	Carpet (i)	(United States) Chris Evert	6–3, 6–2
Loss	54–36	Nov 1981	New South Wales Open, Sydney, Australia	Grass	(United States) Chris Evert	6–4, 2–6, 6–1
Loss	54–37	Dec 1981	Toyota Series Championships, East Rutherford, U.S.	Carpet (i)	(United States) Tracy Austin	2–6, 6–4, 6–2
Win	55–37	Dec 1981	Australian Open, Melbourne	Grass	(United States) Chris Evert	6–7^{(4–7)}, 6–4, 7–5
Win	56–37	Jan 1982	Avon Championships of Washington, Washington, D.C. (4)	Carpet (i)	(United States) Anne Smith	6–2, 6–3
Win	57–37	Jan 1982	Avon Championships of Seattle, Seattle, Washington, U.S.(2)	Carpet (i)	(United States) Andrea Jaeger	6–2, 6–0
Win	58–37	Jan 1982	Avon Championships of Chicago (5)	Carpet (i)	(Australia) Wendy Turnbull	6–4, 6–1
Win	59–37	Feb 1982	Avon Championships of Kansas City, U.S. (3)	Carpet (i)	(United States) Barbara Potter	6–2, 6–2
Win	60–37	Mar 1982	Avon Championships of Dallas, U.S. (4)	Carpet (i)	(Socialist Federal Republic of Yugoslavia) Mima Jaušovec	6–3, 6–2
Loss	60–38	Mar 1982	The Avon Championships, New York City	Carpet (i)	(West Germany) Sylvia Hanika	1–6, 6–3, 6–4
Win	61–38	Apr 1982	Family Circle Cup, Hilton Head Island, South Carolina, U.S.	Clay	(United States) Andrea Jaeger	6–4, 6–2
Win	62–38	Apr 1982	United Airlines Tournament, Orlando, Florida, U.S. (4)	Clay	(Australia) Wendy Turnbull	6–2, 7–5
Win	63–38	May 1982	French Open, Paris	Clay	(United States) Andrea Jaeger	7–6^{(8–6)}, 6–1
Win	64–38	Jun 1982	BMW Championships, Eastbourne, United Kingdom (2)	Grass	(Czechoslovakia) Hana Mandlíková	6–4, 6–3
Win	65–38	Jun 1982	Wimbledon, London (3)	Grass	(United States) Chris Evert	6–1, 3–6, 6–2
Win	66–38	Aug 1982	Player's Canadian Open, Montreal	Hard	(United States) Andrea Jaeger	6–3, 7–5
Win	67–38	Oct 1982	Porsche Tennis Grand Prix, Filderstadt, West Germany	Carpet (i)	(United States) Tracy Austin	6–3, 6–3
Win	68–38	Oct 1982	Daihatsu Challenge, Brighton, United Kingdom (2)	Carpet (i)	(United States) Chris Evert	6–1, 6–4
Win	69–38	Nov 1982	New South Wales Building Society Open, Sydney (2)	Grass	(Australia) Evonne Goolagong	6–0, 3–6, 6–1
Loss	69–39	Dec 1982	Australian Open, Melbourne	Grass	(United States) Chris Evert	6–3, 2–6, 6–3
Win	70–39	Dec 1982	Toyota Championships, East Rutherford, New Jersey, U.S. (2)	Carpet (i)	(United States) Chris Evert	4–6, 6–1, 6–2
Win	71–39	Jan 1983	Virginia Slims of Washington, Washington, D.C. (5)	Carpet (i)	(West Germany) Sylvia Hanika	6–1, 6–1
Win	72–39	Jan 1983	Virginia Slims of Houston, U.S. (5)	Carpet (i)	(West Germany) Sylvia Hanika	6–3, 7–6^{(7–5)}
Win	73–39	Feb 1983	Virginia Slims of Chicago (6)	Carpet (i)	(United States) Andrea Jaeger	6–3, 6–2
Win	74–39	Mar 1983	Virginia Slims of Dallas, U.S. (5)	Carpet (i)	(United States) Chris Evert	6–4, 6–0
Win	75–39	Mar 1983	Virginia Slims Championships, New York City (4)	Carpet (i)	(United States) Chris Evert	6–2, 6–0
Win	76–39	Apr 1983	Family Circle Cup, Hilton Head Island, South Carolina, U.S. (2)	Clay	(United States) Tracy Austin	5–7, 6–1, 6–0
Win	77–39	Apr 1983	United Airlines Tournament of Champions, Orlando, Florida, U.S. (5)	Clay	(United States) Andrea Jaeger	6–1, 7–5
Win	78–39	Jun 1983	BMW Championships, Eastbourne, United Kingdom (3)	Grass	(Australia) Wendy Turnbull	6–1, 6–1
Win	79–39	Jun 1983	Wimbledon, London (4)	Grass	(United States) Andrea Jaeger	6–0, 6–3
Win	80–39	Aug 1983	Virginia Slims of Los Angeles (4)	Hard	(United States) Chris Evert	6–1, 6–3
Win	81–39	Aug 1983	Player's Canadian Open, Toronto (2)	Hard	(United States) Chris Evert	6–4, 4–6, 6–1
Win	82–39	Aug 1983	US Open, New York City	Hard	(United States) Chris Evert	6–1, 6–3
Win	83–39	Oct 1983	Florida Federal Open, Tampa, Florida, U.S. (2)	Hard	(United States) Pam Shriver	6–3, 6–2
Win	84–39	Oct 1983	Porsche Tennis Grand Prix, Filderstadt, West Germany (2)	Carpet (i)	(France) Catherine Tanvier	6–1, 6–2
Win	85–39	Nov 1983	Lion Ladies Cup, Tokyo (3)	Carpet (i)	(United States) Chris Evert	6–2, 6–2
Win	86–39	Nov 1983	Australian Open, Melbourne (2)	Grass	(United States) Kathy Jordan	6–3, 7–6^{(7–5)}
Loss	86–40	Jan 1984	Virginia Slims of California, Oakland, U.S.	Carpet (i)	(Czechoslovakia) Hana Mandlíková	7–6^{(8–6)}, 3–6, 6–4
Win	87–40	Feb 1984	US Women's Indoor Championships, East Hanover, New Jersey, U.S. (3)	Carpet (i)	(United States) Chris Evert	6–2, 7–6^{(7–4)}
Win	88–40	Feb 1984	Virginia Slims Championships, New York City (5)	Carpet (i)	(United States) Chris Evert	6–3, 7–5, 6–1
Win	89–40	Apr 1984	Lipton WITA Championships, Amelia Island, Florida, U.S. (2)	Clay	(United States) Chris Evert	6–2, 6–0
Win	90–40	Apr 1984	United Airlines Tournament of Champions, Orlando, Florida, U.S. (6)	Clay	(Peru) Laura Arraya	6–0, 6–1
Win	91–40	May 1984	French Open, Paris (2)	Clay	(United States) Chris Evert	6–3, 6–1
Win	92–40	Jun 1984	Carlsberg Championships, Eastbourne, United Kingdom (4)	Grass	(United States) Kathy Jordan	6–1, 6–1
Win	93–40	Jun 1984	Wimbledon, London (5)	Grass	(United States) Chris Evert	7–6^{(7–5)}, 6–2
Win	94–40	Jul 1984	Virginia Slims of Newport, Newport, Rhode Island, U.S.	Grass	(United States) Gigi Fernández	6–3, 7–6^{(7–3)}
Win	95–40	Aug 1984	United Jersey Bank Open, Mahwah, New Jersey, U.S.	Hard	(United States) Pam Shriver	6–4, 4–6, 7–5
Win	96–40	Aug 1984	US Open, New York City (2)	Hard	(United States) Chris Evert	4–6, 6–4, 6–4
Win	97–40	Sep 1984	Lynda Carter/Maybelline Tennis Classic, Fort Lauderdale, Florida, U.S.	Hard	(United States) Michelle Torres	6–1, 6–0
Win	98–40	Sep 1984	Virginia Slims of New Orleans, U.S.	Carpet (i)	(United States) Zina Garrison	6–4, 6–3
Win	99–40	Nov 1984	New South Wales Building Society Open, Sydney (3)	Grass	(United States) Ann Henricksson	6–1, 6–1
Win	100–40	Jan 1985	Virginia Slims of Washington, Washington, D.C. (6)	Carpet (i)	(Bulgaria) Manuela Maleeva Fragniere	6–3, 6–2
Loss	100–41	Jan 1985	Virginia Slims of Florida, Key Biscayne, Florida, U.S.	Hard	(United States) Chris Evert	6–2, 6–4
Win	101–41	Feb 1985	Lipton International Players Championships, Delray Beach, Florida, U.S.	Hard	(United States) Chris Evert	6–2, 6–4
Win	102–41	Mar 1985	Virginia Slims of Dallas, U.S. (6)	Carpet (i)	(United States) Chris Evert	6–3, 6–4
Win	103–41	Mar 1985	Virginia Slims Championships, New York City (6)	Carpet (i)	(Czechoslovakia) Helena Suková	6–3, 7–5, 6–4
Win	104–41	Apr 1985	Chrysler Tournament of Champions, Orlando, Florida, U.S. (7)	Clay	(Bulgaria) Katerina Maleeva	6–1, 6–0
Win	105–41	Apr 1985	Virginia Slims of Houston (6)	Clay	(United States) Elise Burgin	6–4, 6–1
Loss	105–42	May 1985	French Open, Paris	Clay	(United States) Chris Evert	6–3, 6–7^{(4–7)}, 7–5
Win	106–42	Jun 1985	Pilkington Glass Championships, Eastbourne, United Kingdom (5)	Grass	(Czechoslovakia) Helena Suková	6–4, 6–3
Win	107–42	Jun 1985	Wimbledon, London (6)	Grass	(United States) Chris Evert	4–6, 6–3, 6–2
Loss	107–43	Aug 1985	US Open, New York City	Hard	(Czechoslovakia) Hana Mandlíková	7–6^{(7–3)}, 1–6, 7–6^{(7–2)}
Win	108–43	Sep 1985	Lynda Carter/Maybelline Tennis Classic, Fort Lauderdale, Florida, U.S. (2)	Clay	(West Germany) Steffi Graf	6–3, 6–1
Win	109–43	Nov 1985	National Panasonic Open, Brisbane, Australia	Grass	(United States) Pam Shriver	6–3, 7–5
Win	110–43	Nov 1985	Family Circle New South Wales Open, Sydney (4)	Grass	(Czechoslovakia) Hana Mandlíková	3–6, 6–1, 6–2
Win	111–43	Nov 1985	Australian Open, Melbourne (3)	Grass	(United States) Chris Evert	6–2, 4–6, 6–2
Win	112–43	Jan 1986	Virginia Slims of Washington, Washington, D.C. (7)	Carpet (i)	(United States) Pam Shriver	6–1, 6–4
Win	113–43	Jan 1986	Virginia Slims of New England, Worcester, Massachusetts, U.S.	Carpet (i)	(West Germany) Claudia Kohde-Kilsch	4–6, 6–1, 6–4
Win	114–43	Feb 1986	US Women's Indoor Championships, Princeton, New Jersey, U.S. (4)	Carpet (i)	(Czechoslovakia) Helena Suková	3–6, 6–0, 7–6^{(7–5)}
Win	115–43	Mar 1986	Virginia Slims of Dallas, U.S. (7)	Carpet (i)	(United States) Chris Evert	6–2, 6–1
Win	116–43	Mar 1986	Virginia Slims Championships, New York City (7)	Carpet (i)	(Czechoslovakia) Hana Mandlíková	6–2, 6–0, 3–6, 6–1
Loss	116–44	May 1986	German Open, Berlin	Clay	(West Germany) Steffi Graf	6–2, 6–3
Loss	116–45	May 1986	French Open, Paris	Clay	(United States) Chris Evert	2–6, 6–3, 6–3
Win	117–45	Jun 1986	Pilkington Glass Championships, Eastbourne, United Kingdom (6)	Grass	(Czechoslovakia) Helena Suková	3–6, 6–3, 6–4
Win	118–45	Jun 1986	Wimbledon, London (7)	Grass	(Czechoslovakia) Hana Mandlíková	7–6^{(7–1)}, 6–3
Win	119–45	Aug 1986	Virginia Slims of Los Angeles (5)	Hard	(United States) Chris Evert	7–6^{(7–5)}, 6–3
Win	120–45	Aug 1986	US Open, New York City (3)	Hard	(Czechoslovakia) Helena Suková	6–3, 6–2
Win	121–45	Sep 1986	Virginia Slims of New Orleans, U.S. (2)	Carpet (i)	(United States) Pam Shriver	6–1, 4–6, 6–2
Win	122–45	Oct 1986	Porsche Tennis Grand Prix, Filderstadt, West Germany (3)	Carpet (i)	(Czechoslovakia) Hana Mandlíková	6–2, 6–3
Win	123–45	Nov 1986	Virginia Slims of New England, Worcester, Massachusetts, U.S. (3)	Carpet (i)	(Czechoslovakia) Hana Mandlíková	6–2, 6–2
Win	124–45	Nov 1986	Virginia Slims of Chicago (7)	Carpet (i)	(Czechoslovakia) Hana Mandlíková	7–5, 7–5
Win	125–45	Nov 1986	Virginia Slims Championships, New York City (8)	Carpet (i)	(West Germany) Steffi Graf	7–6^{(8–6)}, 6–3, 6–2
Loss	125–46	Jan 1987	Australian Open, Melbourne	Grass	(Czechoslovakia) Hana Mandlíková	7–5, 7–6^{(7–1)}
Loss	125–47	Apr 1987	Virginia Slims of Houston, U.S.	Clay	(United States) Chris Evert	3–6, 6–1, 7–6^{(7–4)}
Loss	125–48	May 1987	French Open, Paris	Clay	(West Germany) Steffi Graf	6–4, 4–6, 8–6
Loss	125–49	Jun 1987	Pilkington Glass Championships, Eastbourne, United Kingdom	Grass	(Czechoslovakia) Helena Suková	7–6^{(7–5)}, 6–3
Win	126–49	Jun 1987	Wimbledon, London (8)	Grass	(West Germany) Steffi Graf	7–5, 6–3
Win	127–49	Sep 1987	US Open, New York City (4)	Hard	(West Germany) Steffi Graf	7–6^{(7–4)}, 6–1
Win	128–49	Oct 1987	Porsche Tennis Grand Prix, Filderstadt, West Germany (4)	Carpet (i)	(United States) Chris Evert	7–5, 6–1
Win	129–49	Nov 1987	Virginia Slims of Chicago (8)	Carpet (i)	(Soviet Union) Natasha Zvereva	6–1, 6–2
Win	130–49	Feb 1988	Virginia Slims of Dallas, U.S. (8)	Carpet (i)	(United States) Pam Shriver	6–0, 6–3
Win	131–49	Feb 1988	Virginia Slims of California, Oakland, California, U.S. (3)	Carpet (i)	(Soviet Union) Larisa Savchenko Neiland	6–1, 6–2
Win	132–49	Feb 1988	Virginia Slims of Washington, Washington, D.C. (8)	Carpet (i)	(United States) Pam Shriver	6–0, 6–2
Win	133–49	Apr 1988	Family Circle Cup, Hilton Head Island, South Carolina, U.S. (3)	Clay	(Argentina) Gabriela Sabatini	6–1, 4–6, 6–4
Win	134–49	Apr 1988	Bausch & Lomb Championships, Amelia Island, Florida, U.S. (3)	Clay	(Argentina) Gabriela Sabatini	6–0, 6–2
Loss	134–50	Apr 1988	Virginia Slims of Houston, U.S.	Clay	(United States) Chris Evert	6–0, 6–4
Win	135–50	Jun 1988	Pilkington Glass Championships, Eastbourne, United Kingdom (7)	Grass	(Soviet Union) Natasha Zvereva	6–2, 6–2
Loss	135–51	Jun 1988	Wimbledon, London	Grass	(West Germany) Steffi Graf	
Win	136–51	Oct 1988	Porsche Tennis Grand Prix, Filderstadt, Germany (5)	Carpet (i)	(United States) Chris Evert	6–2, 6–3
Win	137–51	Oct 1988	Virginia Slims of New England, Worcester, Massachusetts, U.S. (4)	Carpet (i)	(Soviet Union) Natasha Zvereva	6–7^{(4–7)}, 6–4, 6–3
Win	138–51	Nov 1988	Virginia Slims of Chicago (9)	Carpet (i)	(United States) Chris Evert	6–2, 6–2
Win	139–51	Jan 1989	New South Wales Open, Sydney (5)	Hard	(Sweden) Catarina Lindqvist	6–2, 6–4
Win	140–51	Jan 1989	Toray Pan Pacific Open, Tokyo	Carpet (i)	(United States) Lori McNeil	6–7^{(3–7)}, 6–3, 7–6^{(7–5)}
Win	141–51	Jun 1989	Dow Classic, Birmingham, United Kingdom	Grass	(United States) Zina Garrison	7–6^{(7–5)}, 6–3
Win	142–51	Jun 1989	Pilkington Glass Championships, Eastbourne, United Kingdom (8)	Grass	(Italy) Raffaella Reggi	7–6^{(7–2)}, 6–2
Loss	142–52	Jun 1989	Wimbledon, London	Grass	(West Germany) Steffi Graf	6–2, 6–7^{(1–7)}, 6–1
Loss	142–53	Aug 1989	US Open, New York City	Hard	(West Germany) Steffi Graf	3–6, 7–5, 6–1
Win	143–53	Aug 1989	Virginia Slims of Los Angeles (6)	Hard	(Argentina) Gabriela Sabatini	6–0, 6–2
Win	144–53	Aug 1989	Player's Canadian Open, Toronto (3)	Hard	(Spain) Arantxa Sánchez Vicario	6–2, 6–2
Win	145–53	Sep 1989	Virginia Slims of Dallas, U.S. (9)	Carpet (i)	(Socialist Federal Republic of Yugoslavia) Monica Seles	7–6^{(7–2)}, 6–3
Win	146–53	Oct 1989	Virginia Slims of New England, Worcester, Massachusetts, U.S. (5)	Carpet (i)	(United States) Zina Garrison	6–2, 6–3
Loss	146–54	Nov 1989	Virginia Slims Championships, New York City	Carpet (i)	(West Germany) Steffi Graf	6–4, 7–5, 2–6, 6–2
Win	147–54	Feb 1990	Virginia Slims of Chicago (10)	Carpet (i)	(Switzerland) Manuela Maleeva Fragniere	6–3, 6–2
Win	148–54	Feb 1990	Virginia Slims of Washington, Washington, D.C. (9)	Carpet (i)	(United States) Zina Garrison	6–1, 6–0
Win	149–54	Feb 1990	Virginia Slims of Indian Wells, Indian Wells, California, U.S.	Hard	(Czechoslovakia) Helena Suková	6–2, 5–7, 6–1
Win	150–54	Apr 1990	Family Circle Cup, Hilton Head Island, South Carolina, U.S. (4)	Clay	(United States) Jennifer Capriati	6–2, 6–4
Loss	150–55	May 1990	Peugeot Italian Open, Rome	Clay	(Socialist Federal Republic of Yugoslavia) Monica Seles	6–1, 6–1
Loss	150–56	May 1990	Virginia Slims of Los Angeles	Hard	(Socialist Federal Republic of Yugoslavia) Monica Seles	6–4, 3–6, 7–6^{(8–6)}
Win	151–56	Jun 1990	Pilkington Glass Championships, Eastbourne United Kingdom (9)	Grass	(United States) Gretchen Magers	6–0, 6–2
Win	152–56	Jun 1990	Wimbledon, London (9)	Grass	(United States) Zina Garrison	6–4, 6–1
Loss	152–57	Oct 1990	Virginia Slims of California, Oakland, U.S.	Carpet (i)	(Socialist Federal Republic of Yugoslavia) Monica Seles	6–3, 7–6^{(7–5)}
Loss	152–58	Jan 1991	Toray Pan Pacific Open, Tokyo	Carpet (i)	(Argentina) Gabriela Sabatini	2–6, 6–2, 6–4
Win	153–58	Feb 1991	Virginia Slims of Chicago (11)	Carpet (i)	(United States) Zina Garrison	6–1, 6–2
Win	154–58	Feb 1991	Virginia Slims of Palm Springs, Palm Springs, California, U.S.	Hard	(Socialist Federal Republic of Yugoslavia) Monica Seles	6–2, 7–6^{(8–6)}
Win	155–58	Jun 1991	Dow Classic, Birmingham, United Kingdom (2)	Grass	(Soviet Union) Natasha Zvereva	6–4, 7–6^{(8–6)}
Win	156–58	Jun 1991	Pilkington Glass Championships, Eastbourne, United Kingdom (10)	Grass	(Spain) Arantxa Sánchez Vicario	6–4, 6–4
Loss	156–59	Aug 1991	US Open, New York City	Hard	(Socialist Federal Republic of Yugoslavia) Monica Seles	7–6^{(7–1)}, 6–1
Loss	156–60	Sep 1991	Milan Indoor, Milan, Italy	Carpet (i)	(Socialist Federal Republic of Yugoslavia) Monica Seles	6–3, 3–6, 6–4
Loss	156–61	Oct 1991	Porsche Tennis Grand Prix, Filderstadt, Germany	Carpet (i)	(West Germany) Anke Huber	2–6, 6–2, 7–6^{(7–4)}
Win	157–61	Nov 1991	Virginia Slims of California, Oakland, California, U.S. (4)	Carpet (i)	(Socialist Federal Republic of Yugoslavia) Monica Seles	6–3, 3–6, 6–3
Loss	157–62	Nov 1991	Virginia Slims Championships, New York City	Carpet (i)	(Socialist Federal Republic of Yugoslavia) Monica Seles	6–4, 3–6, 7–5, 6–0
Loss	157–63	Jan 1992	Toray Pan Pacific Open, Tokyo	Carpet (i)	(Argentina) Gabriela Sabatini	6–2, 4–6, 6–2
Win	158–63	Feb 1992	Virginia Slims of Chicago (12)	Carpet (i)	(Czechoslovakia) Jana Novotná	7–6^{(7–4)}, 4–6, 7–5
Win	159–63	Mar 1992	Acura US Women's Hardcourt Championships, San Antonio, Texas, U.S.	Hard	(France) Nathalie Tauziat	6–2, 6–1
Win	160–63	Aug 1992	Virginia Slims of Los Angeles (7)	Hard	(Socialist Federal Republic of Yugoslavia) Monica Seles	6–4, 6–2
Loss	160–64	Oct 1992	BMW European Women's Indoor Championships, Zürich, Switzerland	Carpet (i)	(Germany) Steffi Graf	2–6, 7–5, 7–5
Win	161–64	Oct 1992	Porsche Tennis Grand Prix, Filderstadt, Germany (6)	Carpet (i)	(Argentina) Gabriela Sabatini	7–6^{(7–1)}, 6–3
Loss	161–65	Nov 1992	Bank of The West Classic, Oakland, U.S.	Carpet (i)	(Socialist Federal Republic of Yugoslavia) Monica Seles	6–3, 6–4
Loss	161–66	Nov 1992	Virginia Slims Championships, New York City	Carpet (i)	(Socialist Federal Republic of Yugoslavia) Monica Seles	7–5, 6–3, 6–1
Win	162–66	Feb 1993	Toray Pan Pacific Open, Yokohama, Japan (2)	Carpet (i)	(Latvia) Larisa Savchenko Neiland	6–2, 6–2
Loss	162–67	Feb 1993	Virginia Slims of Chicago	Carpet (i)	(Socialist Federal Republic of Yugoslavia) Monica Seles	3–6, 6–2, 6–1
Win	163–67	Feb 1993	Open Gaz de France, Paris	Carpet (i)	(Socialist Federal Republic of Yugoslavia) Monica Seles	6–3, 4–6, 7–6^{(7–3)}
Win	164–67	Jun 1993	Volkswagen Cup, Eastbourne, United Kingdom (11)	Grass	(Netherlands) Miriam Oremans	2–6, 6–2, 6–3
Win	165–67	Aug 1993	Virginia Slims of Los Angeles (8)	Hard	(Spain) Arantxa Sánchez Vicario	7–5, 7–6^{(7–4)}
Loss	165–68	Oct 1993	Barilla European Indoors, Zürich, Switzerland	Carpet (i)	(Switzerland) Manuela Maleeva Fragniere	6–3, 7–6^{(7–1)}
Win	166–68	Nov 1993	Bank of The West Classic, Oakland, California, U.S. (5)	Carpet (i)	(United States) Zina Garrison	6–2, 7–6^{(7–1)}
Loss	166–69	Jan 1994	Toray Pan Pacific Open, Tokyo	Carpet (i)	(Germany) Steffi Graf	6–2, 6–4
Win	167–69	Feb 1994	Open Gaz de France, Paris (2)	Hard (i)	(France) Julie Halard	7–5, 6–3
Loss	167–70	May 1994	Italian Open, Rome	Clay	(Spain) Conchita Martínez	7–6^{(7–5)}, 6–4
Loss	167–71	Jun 1994	Wimbledon, London	Grass	(Spain) Conchita Martínez	6–4, 3–6, 6–3
Loss	167–72	Oct 1994	Bank of The West Classic, Oakland, U.S.	Carpet (i)	(Spain) Arantxa Sánchez Vicario	1–6, 7–6^{(7–5)}, 7–6^{(7–3)}

== Doubles finals ==
=== Doubles: 223 (177 wins, 46 losses) ===
Legend (doubles) Grand Slam Titles (31) WTA Championships (11) Series Championships (4)	Titles by surface Hard (39) Clay (33) Grass (26) Carpet (i) (79)

Result	W-L	Date	Tournament	Surface	Partner	Opponents	Score
Loss	0–1	Jun 1973	Italian Open, Rome	Clay	(Czechoslovakia) Renáta Tomanová	(Soviet Union) Olga Morozova (United Kingdom) Virginia Wade	3–6, 6–2, 7–5
Win	1–1	Jul 1973	Czechoslovakia International, Bratislava	Clay	(Czechoslovakia) Renáta Tomanová	unknown	unknown
Win	2–1	Mar 1974	Maureen Connolly Brinker International, Dallas, U.S.	Carpet (i)	(Colombia) Isa Fernández	(Australia) Karen Krantzcke (United Kingdom) Virginia Wade	6–3, 3–6, 6–3
Win	3–1	Dec 1974	Western Australian Championships, Perth	Grass	(Soviet Union) Olga Morozova	(Australia) Lesley Hunt (Japan) Naoko Sawamatsu	6–1, 6–3
Loss	3–2	Feb 1975	Virginia Slims of Ohio, Akron, U.S.	Carpet (i)	(United States) Chris Evert	(France) Françoise Dürr (Netherlands) Betty Stöve	7–5, 7–6(4)
Win	4–2	Feb 1975	Virginia Slims of Chicago, U.S.	Carpet (i)	(United States) Chris Evert	(Australia) Margaret Court (Soviet Union) Olga Morozova	6–2, 7–6^{(5–1)}
Win	5–2	Feb 1975	Virginia Slims of Detroit, U.S.	Carpet (i)	(Australia) Lesley Hunt	(France) Françoise Dürr (Netherlands) Betty Stöve	2–6, 7–5, 6–2
Loss	5–3	Mar 1975	Virginia Slims of Boston, U.S.	Carpet (i)	(United States) Chris Evert	(United States) Rosemary Casals (United States) Billie Jean King	6–3, 6–4
Win	6–3	May 1975	Italian Open, Rome	Clay	(United States) Chris Evert	(United Kingdom) Sue Barker (United Kingdom) Glynis Coles	6–1, 6–2
Win	7–3	Jun 1975	French Open, Paris	Clay	(United States) Chris Evert	(United States) Julie Anthony (Soviet Union) Olga Morozova	6–3, 6–2
Win	8–3	Aug 1975	Medi Quick Open, Rye Brook, New York, U.S.	Clay	(United States) Chris Evert	(Australia) Margaret Court (United Kingdom) Virginia Wade	7–5, 6–7, 6–4
Win	9–3	Sep 1975	Little Mo Classic, Atlanta, U.S.	Carpet (i)	(United States) Chris Evert	(France) Françoise Dürr (Netherlands) Betty Stöve	6–4, 5–7, 6–2
Win	10–3	Sep 1975	Virginia Slims of Palm Springs, Palm Springs, California, U.S.	Hard	(United States) Chris Evert	(United States) Gail Glasgow (United States) Betty Ann Grubb Stuart	6–3, 7–5
Loss	10–4	Jan 1976	Virginia Slims of Chicago, U.S.	Carpet (i)	(United States) Chris Evert	(Soviet Union) Olga Morozova (United Kingdom) Virginia Wade	6–7(4), 6–4, 6–4
Win	11–4	Feb 1976	Virginia Slims of Sarasota, Sarasota, Florida, U.S.	Carpet (i)	(Netherlands) Betty Stöve	(United States) Mona Guerrant (United States) Ann Kiyomura	6–1, 6–0
Win	12–4	Jun 1976	Wimbledon, London	Grass	(United States) Chris Evert	(United States) Billie Jean King (Netherlands) Betty Stöve	6–1, 3–6, 7–5
Win	13–4	Oct 1976	Colgate Inaugural Open, Palm Springs, California, U.S. (2)	Hard	(United States) Chris Evert	(United States) Billie Jean King (Netherlands) Betty Stöve	6–2, 6–4
Win	14–4	Jan 1977	Virginia Slims of Washington, D.C.	Carpet (i)	(Netherlands) Betty Stöve	(United States) Kristien Kemmer-Shaw (United States) Valerie Ziegenfuss	7–5, 6–2
Win	15–4	Dec 1976	Colgate New South Wales Tournament, Sydney, Australia	Grass	(Netherlands) Betty Stöve	(France) Françoise Dürr (United States) Ann Kiyomura	6–3, 7–5
Win	16–4	Jan 1977	Virginia Slims of Florida, Hollywood, U.S.	Carpet (i)	(Netherlands) Betty Stöve	(United States) Rosemary Casals (United States) Chris Evert	6–4, 3–6, 6–4
Win	17–4	Jan 1977	Virginia Slims of Houston, U.S.	Carpet (i)	(Netherlands) Betty Stöve	(United Kingdom) Sue Barker (United States) Ann Kiyomura	4–6, 6–2, 6–4
Win	18–4	Jan 1977	Virginia Slims of Minnesota, Minneapolis, U.S.	Carpet (i)	(United States) Rosemary Casals	(Socialist Federal Republic of Yugoslavia) Mima Jaušovec (Romania) Virginia Ruzici	6–2, 6–1
Loss	18–5	Feb 1977	Virginia Slims of Los Angeles, U.S.	Carpet (i)	(Netherlands) Betty Stöve	(United States) Rosemary Casals (United States) Chris Evert	6–2, 6–4
Win	19–5	Feb 1977	Virginia Slims of Detroit, Detroit, U.S. (2)	Carpet (i)	(Netherlands) Betty Stöve	(United States) Janet Newberry (United States) JoAnne Russell	6–3, 6–4
Win	20–5	Mar 1977	Virginia Slims of Dallas, U.S. (2)	Carpet (i)	(Netherlands) Betty Stöve	(Australia) Kerry Reid (South Africa) Greer Stevens	6–2, 6–4
Win	21–5	Apr 1977	Bridgestone Women's Doubles Championship, Tokyo	Carpet (i)	(Netherlands) Betty Stöve	(France) Françoise Dürr (United Kingdom) Virginia Wade	7–5, 6–3
Loss	21–6	May 1977	Virginia Slims of Philadelphia, U.S.	Carpet (i)	(Netherlands) Betty Stöve	(France) Françoise Dürr (United Kingdom) Virginia Wade	6–4, 4–6, 6–4
Loss	21–7	Jun 1977	Wimbledon, London	Grass	(Netherlands) Betty Stöve	(Australia) Helen Gourlay (United States) JoAnne Russell	6–3, 6–3
Win	22–7	Aug 1977	Ivey-Pepsi Classic, Charlotte, North Carolina, U.S.	Clay	(Netherlands) Betty Stöve	(Czechoslovakia) Regina Maršíková (United States) Pam Teeguarden	6–3, 6–4
Win	23–7	Sep 1977	US Open, New York City	Clay	(Netherlands) Betty Stöve	(United States) Renée Richards (United States) Betty-Ann Stuart	6–1, 7–6
Win	24–7	Oct 1977	Wyler's Women's Tennis Classic, Atlanta, Georgia, U.S. (2)	Carpet (i)	(Netherlands) Betty Stöve	(South Africa) Brigitte Cuypers (South Africa) Marise Kruger	6–4, 6–2
Loss	24–8	Oct 1977	São Paulo International, Brazil	Hard	(Netherlands) Betty Stöve	(Australia) Kerry Reid (Australia) Wendy Turnbull	6–3, 5–7, 6–2
Win	25–8	Oct 1977	Thunderbird Phoenix Open, Phoenix, Arizona, U.S.	Hard	(United States) Billie Jean King	(Australia) Helen Gourlay (United States) JoAnne Russell	6–1, 7–5
Win	26–8	Jan 1978	Virginia Slims of Washington, D.C., U.S. (2)	Carpet (i)	(United States) Billie Jean King	(Netherlands) Betty Stöve (Australia) Wendy Turnbull	6–3, 7–5
Win	27–8	Jan 1978	Virginia Slims of Houston, U.S. (2)	Carpet (i)	(United States) Billie Jean King	(United States) Mona Guerrant (South Africa) Greer Stevens	7–6, 4–6, 7–6
Win	28–8	Feb 1978	Virginia Slims of Detroit, U.S. (3)	Carpet (i)	(United States) Billie Jean King	(Australia) Kerry Reid (Australia) Wendy Turnbull	6–3, 6–4
Win	29–8	Feb 1978	Virginia Slims of Kansas City, U.S.	Carpet (i)	(United States) Billie Jean King	(Australia) Kerry Reid (Australia) Wendy Turnbull	6–4, 6–4
Win	30–8	Mar 1978	Virginia Slims of Dallas, U.S. (3)	Carpet (i)	(United States) Anne Smith	(Australia) Evonne Goolagong (Netherlands) Betty Stöve	6–3, 7–6
Win	31–8	Mar 1978	Virginia Slims of Boston, U.S.	Carpet (i)	(United States) Billie Jean King	(Australia) Evonne Goolagong (Netherlands) Betty Stöve	6–3, 6–2
Win	32–8	Apr 1978	Bridgestone Women's Doubles Championships, Salt Lake City, Utah, U.S. (2)	Carpet (i)	(United States) Billie Jean King	(France) Françoise Dürr (United Kingdom) Virginia Wade	6–4, 6–4
Win	33–8	Apr 1978	Family Circle Cup, Hilton Head Island, South Carolina, U.S.	Clay	(United States) Billie Jean King	(United States) Mona Guerrant (South Africa) Greer Stevens	6–3, 7–5
Loss	33–9	Jun 1978	Eastbourne Championships, Eastbourne, UK	Carpet (i)	(United States) Billie Jean King	(United States) Chris Evert (Netherlands) Betty Stöve	6–4, 6–7, 7–5
Win	34–9	Aug 1978	US Open, New York City (2)	Hard	(United States) Billie Jean King	(Australia) Kerry Reid (Australia) Wendy Turnbull	7–6, 6–4
Loss	34–10	Sep 1978	Wyler's Women's Tennis Classic, Atlanta, Georgia, U.S.	Carpet (i)	(United States) Anne Smith	(France) Françoise Dürr (United Kingdom) Virginia Wade	4–6, 6–2, 6–4
Loss	34–11	Oct 1978	Arizona Thunderbirds Championships, Phoenix, Arizona, U.S.	Hard	(United States) Anne Smith	(United States) Tracy Austin (Netherlands) Betty Stöve	6–4, 6–7, 6–2
Win	35–11	Nov 1978	Florida Federal Open, Clearwater, Florida, U.S.	Hard	(United States) Anne Smith	(Australia) Kerry Reid (Australia) Wendy Turnbull	7–6, 6–3
Win	36–11	Nov 1978	Colgate Series Championships, Palm Springs, California, U.S.	Hard	(United States) Billie Jean King	(Australia) Kerry Reid (Australia) Wendy Turnbull	6–3, 6–4
Win	37–11	Jan 1979	Avon Championships of Houston, U.S. (3)	Carpet (i)	(United States) Janet Newberry	(United States) Pam Shriver (Netherlands) Betty Stöve	4–6, 6–4, 6–2
Loss	37–12	Feb 1979	Avon Championships of Los Angeles	Carpet (i)	(United States) Anne Smith	(United States) Rosemary Casals (United States) Chris Evert	6–4, 1–6, 6–3
Win	38–12	Feb 1979	Avon Championships of Dallas, U.S. (4)	Carpet (i)	(United States) Anne Smith	(United States) Rosemary Casals (United States) Chris Evert	7–6, 6–2
Win	39–12	Apr 1979	Family Circle Cup, Hilton Head Island, South Carolina, U.S. (2)	Clay	(United States) Rosemary Casals	(France) Françoise Dürr (Netherlands) Betty Stöve	6–4, 7–5
Win	40–12	Jun 1979	Wimbledon, London (2)	Grass	(United States) Billie Jean King	(Netherlands) Betty Stöve (Australia) Wendy Turnbull	5–7, 6–3, 6–2
Win	41–12	Jul 1979	Wells Fargo Open, San Diego, California, U.S.	Hard	(United States) Rosemary Casals	(United States) Ann Kiyomura (United States) Betty-Ann Stuart	3–6, 6–4, 6–2
Loss	41–13	Aug 1979	Central Fidelity Bank International, Richmond, Virginia, U.S.	Hard	(United States) Billie Jean King	(Netherlands) Betty Stöve (Australia) Wendy Turnbull	6–1, 6–4
Loss	41–14	Aug 1979	US Open, New York City	Hard	(United States) Billie Jean King	(Netherlands) Betty Stöve (Australia) Wendy Turnbull	6–4, 6–3
Win	42–14	Oct 1979	US Women's Indoor Championships, Minneapolis, U.S. (2)	Carpet (i)	(United States) Billie Jean King	(Netherlands) Betty Stöve (Australia) Wendy Turnbull	6–4, 7–6
Win	43–14	Nov 1979	Porsche Tennis Grand Prix, Filderstadt, Germany	Carpet (i)	(United States) Billie Jean King	(Netherlands) Betty Stöve (Australia) Wendy Turnbull	6–3, 6–3
Win	44–14	Jan 1980	Colgate Series Championships, Landover, Maryland, U.S. (2)	Carpet (i)	(United States) Billie Jean King	(United States) Rosemary Casals (United States) Chris Evert	6–4, 6–3
Win	45–14	Jan 1980	Avon Championships of Kansas City, U.S. (2)	Carpet (i)	(United States) Billie Jean King	(United States) Laura Du Pont (United States) Pam Shriver	6–3, 6–1
Win	46–14	Jan 1980	Avon Championships of Chicago, U.S. (2)	Carpet (i)	(United States) Billie Jean King	(West Germany) Sylvia Hanika (United States) Kathy Jordan	6–3, 6–4
Win	47–14	Feb 1980	Avon Championships of Los Angeles, U.S.	Carpet (i)	(United States) Rosemary Casals	(United States) Kathy Jordan (United States) Anne Smith	7–6, 6–2
Win	48–14	Mar 1980	Avon Championships of Dallas, U.S. (5)	Carpet (i)	(United States) Billie Jean King	(United States) Rosemary Casals (Australia) Wendy Turnbull	4–6, 6–3, 6–3
Win	49–14	Mar 1980	The Avon Championships, New York City	Carpet (i)	(United States) Billie Jean King	(United States) Rosemary Casals (Australia) Wendy Turnbull	6–3, 4–6, 6–3
Win	50–14	Apr 1980	Bridgestone Women's Doubles Championships, Tokyo (3)	Carpet (i)	(United States) Billie Jean King	(United Kingdom) Sue Barker (United States) Ann Kiyomura	7–5, 6–3
Win	51–14	Jul 1980	Central Fidelity Bank International, Richmond, Virginia, U.S.	Hard	(United States) Billie Jean King	(United States) Pam Shriver (United States) Anne Smith	6–4, 4–6, 6–3
Win	52–14	Aug 1980	Volvo Cup, Mahwah, New Jersey, U.S.	Hard	(United States) Candy Reynolds	(United States) Pam Shriver (Netherlands) Betty Stöve	4–6, 6–3, 6–1
Win	53–14	Aug 1980	US Open, New York City (3)	Hard	(United States) Billie Jean King	(United States) Pam Shriver (Netherlands) Betty Stöve	7–6, 7–5
Loss	53–15	Oct 1980	Lynda Carter/Maybelline Tennis Classic, Deerfield Beach, Florida, U.S.	Hard	(United States) Candy Reynolds	(United States) Andrea Jaeger (Czechoslovakia) Regina Maršíková	1–6, 6–1, 6–2
Loss	53–16	Oct 1980	Daihatsu Challenge, Brighton, UK	Carpet (i)	(Netherlands) Betty Stöve	(United States) Kathy Jordan (United States) Anne Smith	6–3, 7–5
Win	54–16	Nov 1980	Australian Open, Melbourne	Grass	(United States) Betsy Nagelsen	(United States) Ann Kiyomura (United States) Candy Reynolds	6–4, 6–4
Loss	54–17	Jan 1981	Avon Championships of Cincinnati, U.S.	Carpet (i)	(United States) Pam Shriver	(United States) Kathy Jordan (United States) Anne Smith	1–6, 6–3, 6–3
Win	55–17	Jan 1981	Avon Championships of Chicago, U.S. (3)	Carpet (i)	(United States) Pam Shriver	(United States) Barbara Potter (United States) Sharon Walsh	6–3, 6–4
Loss	55–18	Feb 1981	Avon Championships of California, Oakland, U.S.	Carpet (i)	(United Kingdom) Virginia Wade	(United States) Rosemary Casals (Australia) Wendy Turnbull	6–1, 6–4
Win	56–18	Mar 1981	Avon Championships of Dallas, U.S. (6)	Carpet (i)	(United States) Pam Shriver	(United States) Kathy Jordan (United States) Anne Smith	6–2, 6–2
Win	57–18	Mar 1981	The Avon Championships, New York City (2)	Carpet (i)	(United States) Pam Shriver	(United States) Barbara Potter (United States) Sharon Walsh	6–0, 7–6
Win	58–18	Apr 1981	United Airlines Tournament of Champions, Orlando, Florida, U.S.	Hard	(United States) Pam Shriver	(United States) Rosemary Casals (Australia) Wendy Turnbull	6–1, 7–6
Win	59–18	Jun 1981	BMW Championships, Eastbourne, United Kingdom	Grass	(United States) Pam Shriver	(United States) Kathy Jordan (United States) Anne Smith	6–7, 6–2, 6–1
Win	60–18	Jun 1981	Wimbledon, London (3)	Grass	(United States) Pam Shriver	(United States) Kathy Jordan (United States) Anne Smith	6–3, 7–6
Win	61–18	Aug 1981	Player's Canadian Open, Toronto	Hard	(United States) Pam Shriver	(United States) Candy Reynolds (United States) Anne Smith	7–6, 7–6
Win	62–18	Aug 1981	US Women's Indoor Championships, Minneapolis, U.S. (3)	Carpet (i)	(United States) Anne Smith	(United States) Rosemary Casals (Australia) Wendy Turnbull	6–3, 7–5
Loss	62–19	Oct 1981	Florida Federal Open, Tampa, U.S.	Hard	(West Germany) Renáta Tomanová	(United States) Rosemary Casals (Australia) Wendy Turnbull	6–3, 6–4
Win	63–19	Oct 1981	Porsche Tennis Grand Prix, Filderstadt, Germany (2)	Carpet (i)	(Socialist Federal Republic of Yugoslavia) Mima Jaušovec	(United States) Barbara Potter (United States) Anne Smith	6–4, 6–2
Win	64–19	Nov 1981	New South Wales Building Society Open, Sydney (2)	Grass	(United States) Pam Shriver	(United States) Kathy Jordan (United States) Anne Smith	6–7, 6–2, 6–4
Loss	64–20	Nov 1981	Australian Open, Melbourne	Grass	(United States) Pam Shriver	(United States) Kathy Jordan (United States) Anne Smith	6–2, 7–5
Win	65–20	Dec 1981	Toyota Series Championships, East Rutherford, New Jersey, U.S. (3)	Carpet (i)	(United States) Pam Shriver	(United States) Rosemary Casals (Australia) Wendy Turnbull	6–3, 6–4
Loss	65–21	Jan 1982	Avon Championships of Washington, Washington, D.C.	Carpet (i)	(United States) Pam Shriver	(United States) Kathy Jordan (United States) Anne Smith	6–2, 3–6, 6–1
Win	66–21	Jan 1982	Avon Championships of Chicago, U.S. (4)	Carpet (i)	(United States) Pam Shriver	(United States) Rosemary Casals (Australia) Wendy Turnbull	7–5, 6–4
Win	67–21	Mar 1982	Avon Championships of Dallas, U.S. (7)	Carpet (i)	(United States) Pam Shriver	(South Africa) Ilana Kloss (United States) Billie Jean King	6–4, 6–4
Win	68–21	Mar 1982	The Avon Championships, New York City (3)	Carpet (i)	(United States) Pam Shriver	(United States) Kathy Jordan (United States) Anne Smith	6–4, 6–3
Win	69–21	Apr 1982	Family Circle Cup, Hilton Head Island, South Carolina, U.S. (3)	Clay	(United States) Pam Shriver	(United States) JoAnne Russell (Romania) Virginia Ruzici	6–1, 6–2
Win	70–21	Apr 1982	Bridgestone Women's Doubles Championships, Fort Worth, Texas, U.S. (4)	Clay	(United States) Pam Shriver	(United States) Kathy Jordan (United States) Anne Smith	7–5, 6–3
Win	71–21	May 1982	French Open, Paris (2)	Clay	(United States) Anne Smith	(United States) Rosemary Casals (Australia) Wendy Turnbull	6–3, 6–4
Win	72–21	Jun 1982	BMW Championships, Eastbourne, United Kingdom (2)	Grass	(United States) Pam Shriver	(United States) Kathy Jordan (United States) Anne Smith	6–3, 6–4
Win	73–21	Jun 1982	Wimbledon, London (4)	Grass	(United States) Pam Shriver	(United States) Kathy Jordan (United States) Anne Smith	7–5, 6–1
Win	74–21	Aug 1982	Player's Canadian Open, Montreal (2)	Hard	(United States) Candy Reynolds	(United States) Barbara Potter (United States) Sharon Walsh	6–4, 6–4
Win	75–21	Oct 1982	Porsche Tennis Grand Prix, Filderstadt, Germany (3)	Carpet (i)	(United States) Pam Shriver	(United States) Candy Reynolds (United States) Anne Smith	6–2, 6–0
Win	76–21	Oct 1982	Daihatsu Challenge, Brighton, United Kingdom	Carpet (i)	(United States) Pam Shriver	(United States) Barbara Potter (United States) Sharon Walsh	2–6, 7–5, 6–4
Win	77–21	Nov 1982	New South Wales Building Society Open, Sydney (3)	Grass	(United States) Pam Shriver	(West Germany) Claudia Kohde (West Germany) Eva Pfaff	6–2, 2–6, 7–6
Win	78–21	Nov 1982	Australian Open, Melbourne (2)	Grass	(United States) Pam Shriver	(West Germany) Claudia Kohde (West Germany) Eva Pfaff	6–4, 6–2
Win	79–21	Dec 1982	Toyota Series Championships, East Rutherford, New Jersey, U.S. (4)	Carpet (i)	(United States) Pam Shriver	(United States) Candy Reynolds (United States) Paula Smith	6–4, 7–5
Win	80–21	Jan 1983	Virginia Slims of Washington, Washington, D.C. (3)	Carpet (i)	(United States) Pam Shriver	(United States) Kathy Jordan (United States) Anne Smith	4–6, 7–5, 6–3
Win	81–21	Jan 1983	Virginia Slims of Houston, U.S. (4)	Carpet (i)	(United States) Pam Shriver	(United Kingdom) Jo Durie (United States) Barbara Potter	6–4, 6–3
Win	82–21	Feb 1983	Virginia Slims of Chicago, U.S. (5)	Carpet (i)	(United States) Pam Shriver	(United States) Kathy Jordan (United States) Anne Smith	6–1, 6–2
Win	83–21	Mar 1983	Virginia Slims of Dallas, U.S. (8)	Carpet (i)	(United States) Pam Shriver	(United States) Rosemary Casals (Australia) Wendy Turnbull	6–3, 6–2
Win	84–21	Mar 1983	Virginia Slims Championships, New York City (4)	Carpet (i)	(United States) Pam Shriver	(Germany) Claudia Kohde-Kilsch (Germany) Eva Pfaff	7–5, 6–2
Loss	84–22	Apr 1983	United Airlines Tournament of Champions, Orlando, Florida, U.S.	Clay	(United States) Pam Shriver	(United States) Kathy Jordan (United States) Anne Smith	6–3, 1–6, 7–6(9)
Win	85–22	Apr 1983	Family Circle Cup, Hilton Head Island, South Carolina, U.S. (4)	Clay	(United States) Candy Reynolds	(United States) Andrea Jaeger (United States) Paula Smith	6–2, 6–3
Win	86–22	Jun 1983	BMW Championships, Eastbourne, United Kingdom (3)	Grass	(United States) Pam Shriver	(United Kingdom) Jo Durie (United Kingdom) Anne Hobbs	6–1, 6–0
Win	87–22	Jun 1983	Wimbledon, London (5)	Grass	(United States) Pam Shriver	(United States) Rosemary Casals (Australia) Wendy Turnbull	6–2, 6–2
Win	88–22	Aug 1983	Virginia Slims of Los Angeles (2)	Hard	(United States) Pam Shriver	(United States) Betsy Nagelsen (Romania) Virginia Ruzici	6–1, 6–0
Win	89–22	Aug 1983	US Open, New York City (4)	Hard	(United States) Pam Shriver	(South Africa) Rosalyn Fairbank (United States) Candy Reynolds	6–7, 6–1, 6–3
Win	90–22	Oct 1983	Florida Federal Open, Tampa, Florida, U.S. (2)	Hard	(United States) Pam Shriver	(United States) Bonnie Gadusek (United States) Wendy White	6–0, 6–1
Win	91–22	Oct 1983	Porsche Tennis Grand Prix, Filderstadt, Germany (4)	Carpet (i)	(United States) Candy Reynolds	(Romania) Virginia Ruzici (France) Catherine Tanvier	6–2, 6–1
Win	92–22	Nov 1983	Australian Open, Melbourne (3)	Grass	(United States) Pam Shriver	(United Kingdom) Anne Hobbs (Australia) Wendy Turnbull	6–4, 6–7, 6–2
Win	93–22	Jan 1984	Virginia Slims of California, Oakland, U.S.	Carpet (i)	(United States) Pam Shriver	(United States) Rosemary Casals (United States) Alycia Moulton	6–2, 6–3
Win	94–22	Feb 1984	Computerland US Women's Indoor Championships, East Hanover, New Jersey, U.S. (4)	Carpet (i)	(United States) Pam Shriver	(United Kingdom) Jo Durie (United States) Ann Kiyomura	6–4, 6–3
Win	95–22	Feb 1984	Virginia Slims Championships, New York City (5)	Carpet (i)	(United States) Pam Shriver	(United Kingdom) Jo Durie (United States) Ann Kiyomura	6–3, 6–1
Win	96–22	May 1984	French Open, Paris (3)	Clay	(United States) Pam Shriver	(United States) Rosemary Casals (Australia) Wendy Turnbull	6–3, 6–4
Win	97–22	Jun 1984	Carlsberg Championships, Eastbourne, United Kingdom (4)	Grass	(United States) Pam Shriver	(United Kingdom) Jo Durie (United States) Ann Kiyomura Hayashi	6–4, 6–2
Win	98–22	Jun 1984	Wimbledon, London (6)	Grass	(United States) Pam Shriver	(United States) Kathy Jordan (United States) Anne Smith	6–4, 6–3
Win	99–22	Aug 1984	United Jersey Bank Open, Mahwah, New Jersey, U.S. (2)	Hard	(United States) Pam Shriver	(United Kingdom) Jo Durie (United States) Ann Kiyomura Hayashi	7–5, 3–6, 6–2
Win	100–22	Aug 1984	US Open, New York City (5)	Hard	(United States) Pam Shriver	(United Kingdom) Anne Hobbs (Australia) Wendy Turnbull	6–2, 6–4
Win	101–22	Sep 1984	Lynda Carter/Maybelline Tennis Classic, Fort Lauderdale, Florida, U.S.	Hard	(Australia) Elizabeth Smylie	(United States) Barbara Potter (United States) Sharon Walsh	2–6, 6–2, 6–3
Win	102–22	Sep 1984	Virginia Slims of New Orleans, U.S.	Carpet (i)	(United States) Pam Shriver	(Australia) Wendy Turnbull (United States) Sharon Walsh	6–4, 6–1
Win	103–22	Nov 1984	National Panasonic Open, Brisbane, Australia	Grass	(United States) Pam Shriver	(West Germany) Bettina Bunge (West Germany) Eva Pfaff	6–3, 6–2
Win	104–22	Nov 1984	Australian Open, Melbourne (4)	Grass	(United States) Pam Shriver	(West Germany) Claudia Kohde-Kilsch (Czechoslovakia) Helena Suková	6–3, 6–4
Win	105–22	Jan 1985	Virginia Slims of Washington, Washington, D.C. (4)	Carpet (i)	(United States) Gigi Fernández	(West Germany) Claudia Kohde-Kilsch (Czechoslovakia) Helena Suková	6–3, 3–6, 6–3
Win	106–22	Feb 1985	Lipton International Players Championships, Delray Beach, Florida, U.S.	Hard	(United States) Gigi Fernández	(United States) Kathy Jordan (Czechoslovakia) Hana Mandlíková	7–6^{(7–4)}, 6–2
Win	107–22	Mar 1985	US Indoor Championships, Princeton, New Jersey, U.S. (5)	Carpet (i)	(United States) Pam Shriver	(Netherlands) Marcella Mesker (Australia) Elizabeth Smylie	7–5, 6–2
Win	108–22	Mar 1985	Virginia Slims Championships, New York City (6)	Carpet (i)	(United States) Pam Shriver	(West Germany) Claudia Kohde-Kilsch (Czechoslovakia) Helena Suková	6–7^{(4–7)}, 6–4, 7–6^{(7–5)}
Win	109–22	Apr 1985	Chrysler Tournament of Champions, Orlando, Florida, U.S. (2)	Clay	(United States) Pam Shriver	(United States) Elise Burgin (United States) Kathleen Horvath	6–3, 6–1
Win	110–22	Apr 1985	Virginia Slims of Houston, U.S. (5)	Clay	(United States) Elise Burgin	(Bulgaria) Manuela Maleeva (Czechoslovakia) Helena Suková	6–1, 3–6, 6–3
Win	111–22	May 1985	French Open, Paris (4)	Clay	(United States) Pam Shriver	(West Germany) Claudia Kohde-Kilsch (Czechoslovakia) Helena Suková	4–6, 6–2, 6–2
Win	112–22	Jun 1985	Pilkington Glass Championships, Eastbourne, United Kingdom (5)	Grass	(United States) Pam Shriver	(United States) Kathy Jordan (Australia) Elizabeth Smylie	7–5, 6–4
Loss	112–23	Jun 1985	Wimbledon, London	Grass	(United States) Pam Shriver	(United States) Kathy Jordan (Australia) Elizabeth Smylie	5–7, 6–3, 6–4
Win	113–23	Aug 1985	Player's Canadian Open, Toronto (3)	Hard	(United States) Gigi Fernández	(Netherlands) Marcella Mesker (France) Pascale Paradis	6–4, 6–0
Loss	113–24	Aug 1985	US Open, New York City	Hard	(United States) Pam Shriver	(West Germany) Claudia Kohde-Kilsch (Czechoslovakia) Helena Suková	6–7(5), 6–2, 6–3
Win	114–24	Nov 1985	National Panasonic Open, Brisbane, Australia (2)	Grass	(United States) Pam Shriver	(West Germany) Claudia Kohde-Kilsch (Czechoslovakia) Helena Suková	6–4, 6–7^{(6–8)}, 6–1
Win	115–24	Nov 1985	Australian Open, Melbourne (5)	Grass	(United States) Pam Shriver	(West Germany) Claudia Kohde-Kilsch (Czechoslovakia) Helena Suková	6–3, 6–4
Win	116–24	Jan 1986	Virginia Slims of Washington, Washington, D.C. (5)	Carpet (i)	(United States) Pam Shriver	(West Germany) Claudia Kohde-Kilsch (Czechoslovakia) Helena Suková	7–5, 6–3
Win	117–24	Jan 1986	Virginia Slims of New England, Worcester, Massachusetts, U.S.	Carpet (i)	(United States) Pam Shriver	(West Germany) Claudia Kohde-Kilsch (Czechoslovakia) Helena Suková	6–3, 6–4
Win	118–24	Mar 1986	Chrysler-Plymouth Tournament of Champions, Marco Island, Florida, U.S. (3)	Clay	(Hungary) Andrea Temesvári	(United States) Elisa Burgin (United States) Kathy Jordan	7–5, 6–2
Loss	118–25	May 1986	German Open, Berlin	Clay	(Hungary) Andrea Temesvári	(West Germany) Steffi Graf (Czechoslovakia) Helena Suková	7–5, 6–2
Win	119–25	May 1986	French Open, Paris (5)	Clay	(Hungary) Andrea Temesvári	(West Germany) Steffi Graf (Argentina) Gabriela Sabatini	6–1, 6–2
Win	120–25	Jun 1986	Pilkington Glass Championships, Eastbourne, United Kingdom (6)	Grass	(United States) Pam Shriver	(West Germany) Claudia Kohde-Kilsch (Czechoslovakia) Helena Suková	6–2, 6–4
Win	121–25	Jun 1986	Wimbledon, London (7)	Grass	(United States) Pam Shriver	(Czechoslovakia) Hana Mandlíková (Australia) Wendy Turnbull	6–1, 6–3
Win	122–25	Aug 1986	Virginia Slims of Los Angeles (3)	Hard	(United States) Pam Shriver	(West Germany) Claudia Kohde-Kilsch (Czechoslovakia) Helena Suková	6–4, 6–3
Win	123–25	Aug 1986	US Open, New York City (6)	Hard	(United States) Pam Shriver	(Czechoslovakia) Hana Mandlíková (Australia) Wendy Turnbull	6–4, 3–6, 6–3
Win	124–25	Oct 1986	Porsche Tennis Grand Prix, Filderstadt, Germany (5)	Carpet (i)	(United States) Pam Shriver	(United States) Zina Garrison (Argentina) Gabriela Sabatini	7–6^{(7–5)}, 6–4
Win	125–25	Nov 1986	Virginia Slims of New England, Worcester, Massachusetts, U.S. (2)	Carpet (i)	(United States) Pam Shriver	(West Germany) Claudia Kohde-Kilsch (Czechoslovakia) Helena Suková	7–5, 6–3
Win	126–25	Nov 1986	Virginia Slims Championships, New York City (7)	Carpet (i)	(United States) Pam Shriver	(West Germany) Claudia Kohde-Kilsch (Czechoslovakia) Helena Suková	7–6^{(7–1)}, 6–3
Win	127–25	Jan 1987	Australian Open, Melbourne (6)	Grass	(United States) Pam Shriver	(United States) Zina Garrison (United States) Lori McNeil	6–1, 6–0
Win	128–25	Feb 1987	Lipton International Players Championships, Key Biscayne, Florida, U.S. (2)	Hard	(United States) Pam Shriver	(West Germany) Claudia Kohde-Kilsch (Czechoslovakia) Helena Suková	6–3, 7–6^{(8–6)}
Win	129–25	Apr 1987	Virginia Slims of Houston, U.S. (6)	Clay	(United States) Kathy Jordan	(United States) Zina Garrison (United States) Lori McNeil	6–2, 6–4
Win	130–25	May 1987	Italian Open, Rome (2)	Clay	(Argentina) Gabriela Sabatini	(West Germany) Claudia Kohde-Kilsch (Czechoslovakia) Helena Suková	6–4, 6–1
Win	131–25	May 1987	French Open, Paris (6)	Clay	(United States) Pam Shriver	(Germany) Steffi Graf (Argentina) Gabriela Sabatini	6–2, 6–1
Win	132–25	Aug 1987	Virginia Slims of Los Angeles (4)	Hard	(United States) Pam Shriver	(United States) Zina Garrison (United States) Lori McNeil	6–3, 6–4
Win	133–25	Sep 1987	US Open, New York City (7)	Hard	(United States) Pam Shriver	(United States) Kathy Jordan (Australia) Elizabeth Smylie	5–7, 6–4, 6–2
Win	134–25	Oct 1987	Porsche Tennis Grand Prix, Filderstadt, Germany (6)	Carpet (i)	(United States) Pam Shriver	(United States) Zina Garrison (United States) Lori McNeil	6–1, 6–2
Win	135–25	Nov 1987	Virginia Slims Championships, New York City (8)	Carpet (i)	(United States) Pam Shriver	(West Germany) Claudia Kohde-Kilsch (Czechoslovakia) Helena Suková	6–1, 6–1
Win	136–25	Jan 1988	Australian Open, Melbourne (7)	Hard	(United States) Pam Shriver	(United States) Chris Evert (Australia) Wendy Turnbull	6–0, 7–5
Win	137–25	Feb 1988	Virginia Slims of California, Oakland, U.S. (2)	Carpet (i)	(United States) Rosemary Casals	(Australia) Hana Mandlíková (Czechoslovakia) Jana Novotná	6–4, 6–4
Win	138–25	Feb 1988	Virginia Slims of Washington, Washington, D.C. (6)	Carpet (i)	(United States) Pam Shriver	(Argentina) Gabriela Sabatini (Czechoslovakia) Helena Suková	6–3, 6–4
Loss	138–26	Apr 1988	Virginia Slims of Houston, U.S.	Clay	(United States) Lori McNeil	(United States) Katrina Adams (United States) Zina Garrison	6–7, 6–2, 6–4
Win	139–26	Apr 1988	Family Circle Cup, Hilton Head Island, South Carolina, U.S. (5)	Clay	(United States) Lori McNeil	(West Germany) Claudia Kohde-Kilsch (Argentina) Gabriela Sabatini	6–2, 2–6, 6–3
Win	140–26	May 1988	French Open, Paris (7)	Clay	(United States) Pam Shriver	(West Germany) Claudia Kohde-Kilsch (Czechoslovakia) Helena Suková	6–2, 7–5
Win	141–26	Oct 1988	Porsche Tennis Grand Prix, Filderstadt, Germany (7)	Carpet (i)	(Poland) Iwona Kuczyńska	(Italy) Raffaela Reggi (South Africa) Elna Reinach	6–1, 6–1
Win	142–26	Oct 1988	Virginia Slims of New England, Worcester, Massachusetts, U.S. (3)	Carpet (i)	(United States) Pam Shriver	(Argentina) Gabriela Sabatini (Czechoslovakia) Helena Suková	6–3, 3–6, 7–5
Win	143–26	Nov 1988	Virginia Slims Championships, New York City (9)	Carpet (i)	(United States) Pam Shriver	(Soviet Union) Larisa Savchenko Neiland (Soviet Union) Natasha Zvereva	6–3, 6–4
Win	144–26	Jan 1989	New South Wales Open, Sydney (4)	Hard	(United States) Pam Shriver	(Australia) Elizabeth Smylie (Australia) Wendy Turnbull	6–3, 6–3
Win	145–26	Jan 1989	Australian Open, Melbourne (8)	Hard	(United States) Pam Shriver	(United States) Patty Fendick (Canada) Jill Hetherington	3–6, 6–3, 6–2
Win	146–26	Apr 1989	Family Circle Cup, Hilton Head Island, South Carolina, U.S. (6)	Clay	(Australia) Hana Mandlíková	(United States) Mary Lou Daniels (United States) Wendy White	6–4, 6–1
Loss	146–27	Apr 1989	Bausch and Lomb Championships, Amelia Island, Florida, U.S.	Clay	(United States) Pam Shriver	(Soviet Union) Larisa Savchenko Neiland (Soviet Union) Natasha Zvereva	7–6(5), 2–6, 6–1
Win	147–27	Aug 1989	Virginia Slims of Los Angeles (5)	Hard	(Australia) Wendy Turnbull	(United States) Mary Joe Fernández (West Germany) Claudia Kohde-Kilsch	5–2 ret.
Win	148–27	Aug 1989	US Open, New York City (8)	Hard	(Australia) Hana Mandlíková	(United States) Mary Joe Fernández (United States) Pam Shriver	5–7, 6–4, 6–4
Win	149–27	Oct 1989	Virginia Slims of New England, Worcester, Massachusetts, U.S. (4)	Carpet (i)	(United States) Pam Shriver	(United States) Elise Burgin (South Africa) Rosalyn Fairbank	6–4, 4–6, 6–4
Loss	149–28	Aug 1989	Players Ltd Challenge Canadian Open, Toronto	Hard	(Soviet Union) Larisa Savchenko Neiland	(United States) Gigi Fernández (United States) Robin White	6–1, 7–5
Win	150–28	Nov 1989	Virginia Slims Championships, New York City (10)	Carpet (i)	(United States) Pam Shriver	(Soviet Union) Larisa Savchenko Neiland (Soviet Union) Natasha Zvereva	6–3, 6–2
Win	151–28	Feb 1990	Virginia Slims of Chicago (6)	Carpet (i)	(United States) Anne Smith	(Spain) Arantxa Sánchez Vicario (France) Natalie Tauziat	6–7(9), 6–4, 6–3
Win	152–28	Feb 1990	Virginia Slims of Washington, Washington, D.C. (7)	Carpet (i)	(United States) Zina Garrison	(United States) Ann Henricksson (South Africa) Dinky Van Rensburg	6–0, 6–3
Loss	152–29	Feb 1990	Virginia Slims of Indian Wells, California, U.S.	Hard	(United States) Gigi Fernández	(Czechoslovakia) Jana Novotná (Czechoslovakia) Helena Suková	6–2, 7–6
Win	153–29	Apr 1990	Family Circle Cup, Hilton Head Island, South Carolina, U.S. (7)	Clay	(Spain) Arantxa Sánchez Vicario	(Argentina) Mercedes Paz (Soviet Union) Natasha Zvereva	6–2, 6–1
Win	154–29	Apr 1990	Citizen Cup, Hamburg, Germany	Clay	(United States) Gigi Fernández	(Soviet Union) Larisa Savchenko Neiland (Czechoslovakia) Helena Suková	6–2, 6–3
Win	155–29	Aug 1990	US Open, New York City (9)	Hard	(United States) Gigi Fernández	(Czechoslovakia) Jana Novotná (Czechoslovakia) Helena Suková	6–2, 6–4
Loss	155–30	Sep 1990	Nicherei International Ladies Championships, Tokyo	Carpet (i)	(United States) Gigi Fernández	(United States) Mary Joe Fernández (United States) Robin White	4–6, 6–3, 7–6
Loss	155–31	Feb 1991	Virginia Slims of Chicago	Carpet (i)	(United States) Pam Shriver	(United States) Gigi Fernández (Czechoslovakia) Jana Novotná	6–2, 6–4
Win	156–31	Apr 1991	International Championships of Spain, Barcelona	Clay	(Spain) Arantxa Sánchez Vicario	(France) Nathalie Tauziat (Austria) Judith Wiesner	6–1, 6–3
Win	157–31	Oct 1991	Porsche Tennis Grand Prix, Filderstadt, Germany (8)	Carpet (i)	(Czechoslovakia) Jana Novotná	(United States) Pam Shriver (Soviet Union) Natasha Zvereva	6–2, 5–7, 6–4
Loss	157–32	Nov 1991	Virginia Slims of California, Oakland, U.S.	Carpet (i)	(United States) Pam Shriver	(United States) Patty Fendick (United States) Gigi Fernández	6–4, 7–5
Win	158–32	Nov 1991	Virginia Slims Championships, New York City (11)	Carpet (i)	(United States) Pam Shriver	(United States) Gigi Fernández (Czechoslovakia) Jana Novotná	4–6, 7–5, 6–4
Loss	158–33	Jan 1992	Toray Pan Pacific Open, Tokyo	Carpet (i)	(United States) Pam Shriver	(Spain) Arantxa Sánchez Vicario (Czechoslovakia) Helena Suková	7–5, 6–1
Win	159–33	Feb 1992	Virginia Slims of Chicago, U.S. (7)	Carpet (i)	(United States) Pam Shriver	(United States) Katrina Adams (United States) Zina Garrison	6–4, 7–6^{(9–7)}
Win	160–33	Mar 1992	Acura US Women's Hardcourt Championships, San Antonio, Texas, U.S.	Hard	(United States) Pam Shriver	(United States) Patty Fendick (Czechoslovakia) Andrea Strnadová	3–6, 6–2, 7–6^{(7–4)}
Loss	160–34	Oct 1992	BMW European Women's Indoor Championships, Zürich, Switzerland	Carpet (i)	(United States) Pam Shriver	(Czechoslovakia) Helena Suková (Belarus) Natasha Zvereva	7–6, 6–4
Win	161–34	Feb 1993	Toray Pan Pacific Open, Yokohama, Japan	Carpet (i)	(Czechoslovakia) Helena Suková	(United States) Lori McNeil (Australia) Rennae Stubbs	6–4, 6–3
Win	162–34	Jun 1993	DFS Classic, Birmingham, United Kingdom	Grass	(United States) Lori McNeil	(United States) Pam Shriver (Australia) Elizabeth Smylie	6–3, 6–4
Win	163–34	Oct 1993	Barilla European Indoors, Zürich, Switzerland	Carpet (i)	(United States) Zina Garrison	(United States) Gigi Fernández (Belarus) Natasha Zvereva	6–3, 5–7, 6–3
Loss	163–35	Oct 1993	Porsche Tennis Grand Prix, Filderstadt, Germany	Carpet (i)	(United States) Patty Fendick	(United States) Gigi Fernández (Belarus) Natasha Zvereva	7–6, 6–4
Loss	163–36	Jan 1994	Toray Pan Pacific Open, Tokyo	Carpet (i)	(Netherlands) Manon Bollegraf	(United States) Pam Shriver (Australia) Elizabeth Smylie	6–3, 3–6, 7–6
Loss	163–37	Feb 1994	Virginia Slims of Chicago, U.S.	Carpet (i)	(Netherlands) Manon Bollegraf	(United States) Gigi Fernández (Belarus) Natasha Zvereva	6–3, 3–6, 6–4
Win	164–37	Mar 1994	Virginia Slims of Houston, Texas, U.S. (7)	Clay	(Netherlands) Manon Bollegraf	(United States) Katrina Adams (United States) Zina Garrison	6–4, 6–2
Loss	164–38	Oct 1994	Bank of The West Classic, Oakland, U.S.	Carpet (i)	(United States) Gigi Fernández	(United States) Lindsay Davenport (Spain) Arantxa Sánchez Vicario	7–5, 6–4
Win	165–38	Oct 1994	European Women's Indoor Championships, Zürich, Switzerland (2)	Carpet (i)	(Netherlands) Manon Bollegraf	(United States) Patty Fendick (United States) Meredith McGrath	7–6^{(7–3)}, 6–1
Loss	165–39	Apr 2001	Bausch and Lomb Championships, Amelia Island, Florida, U.S.	Clay	(Spain) Arantxa Sánchez Vicario	(Spain) Conchita Martínez (Argentina) Patricia Tarabini	6–4, 6–2
Win	166–39	May 2002	Open de Espana Villa de Madrid 2012, Madrid	Clay	(Belarus) Natasha Zvereva	(Paraguay) Rossana de los Ríos (Spain) Arantxa Sánchez Vicario	6–2, 6–3
Win	167–39	Dec 2002	Uncle Toby's Women's Hardcourts, Gold Coast, Queensland, Australia	Hard	(Russia) Svetlana Kuznetsova	(France) Nathalie Dechy (France) Émilie Loit	6–4, 6–4
Win	168–39	Feb 2003	Dubai Duty Free Women's Open, United Arab Emirates	Hard	(Russia) Svetlana Kuznetsova	(Zimbabwe) Cara Black (Russia) Elena Likhovtseva	6–3, 7–6^{(9–7)}
Win	169–39	Mar 2003	Sarasota Clay Court Classic, U.S.	Clay	(South Africa) Liezel Huber	(Japan) Shinobu Asagoe (Japan) Nana Miyagi	7–6^{(10–8)}, 6–3
Win	170–39	May 2003	Italian Open, Rome (3)	Clay	(Russia) Svetlana Kuznetsova	(Federal Republic of Yugoslavia) Jelena Dokić (Russia) Nadia Petrova	6–4, 5–7, 6–2
Loss	170–40	Jun 2003	DFS Classic, Birmingham, United Kingdom	Grass	(Australia) Alicia Molik	(Belgium) Els Callens (United States) Meilen Tu	7–5, 6–4
Win	171–40	Aug 2003	Rogers AT&T Cup, Toronto (3)	Hard	(Russia) Svetlana Kuznetsova	(Venezuela) María Vento-Kabchi (Indonesia) Angelique Widjaja	3–6, 6–1, 6–1
Loss	171–41	Aug 2003	US Open, New York City	Hard	(Russia) Svetlana Kuznetsova	(Spain) Virginia Ruano Pascual (Argentina) Paola Suarez	6–2, 6–3
Win	172–41	Sep 2003	Sparkassen Cup Internationaler Damen Tennis Grand Prix, Leipzig, Germany	Carpet (i)	(Russia) Svetlana Kuznetsova	(Russia) Elena Likhovtseva (Russia) Nadia Petrova	3–6, 6–1, 6–3
Win	173–41	Oct 2003	Advanta Championships, Philadelphia, U.S.	Hard (Indoor)	(Russia) Svetlana Kuznetsova	(Zimbabwe) Cara Black (Australia) Rennae Stubbs	6–3, 6–4
Loss	173–42	Oct 2003	Porsche Tennis Grand Prix, Filderstadt, Germany	Carpet (i)	(Zimbabwe) Cara Black	(United States) Lisa Raymond (Australia) Rennae Stubbs	6–2, 6–4
Loss	173–43	Apr 2004	Family Circle Cup, Charleston, South Carolina, U.S.	Clay	(United States) Lisa Raymond	(Spain) Virginia Ruano Pascual (Argentina) Paola Suarez	6–4, 6–1
Win	174–43	May 2004	Wien Energie Grand Prix, Vienna, Austria	Clay	(United States) Lisa Raymond	(Zimbabwe) Cara Black (Australia) Rennae Stubbs	6–2, 7–5
Loss	174–44	Aug 2004	Pilot Pen Tennis, New Haven, Connecticut, U.S.	Hard	(United States) Lisa Raymond	(Russia) Nadia Petrova (United States) Meghann Shaughnessy	6–1, 1–6, 7–6(4)
Win	175–44	Aug 2005	Rogers Cup, Toronto (4)	Hard	(Germany) Anna-Lena Grönefeld	(Spain) Conchita Martínez (Spain) Virginia Ruano Pascual	5–7, 6–3, 6–4
Loss	175–45	Mar 2006	NASDAQ-100 Open, Key Biscayne, Florida, U.S.	Hard	(South Africa) Liezel Huber	(United States) Lisa Raymond (Australia) Samantha Stosur	6–4, 7–5
Win	176–45	May 2006	Internationaux de Strasbourg, France	Clay	(South Africa) Liezel Huber	(Germany) Martina Müller (Romania) Andreea Vanc	6–2, 7–6^{(7–1)}
Loss	176–46	Jun 2006	Hastings Direct Ladies International Championships, Eastbourne, United Kingdom	Grass	(South Africa) Liezel Huber	(Russia) Svetlana Kuznetsova (France) Amélie Mauresmo	6–2, 6–4
Win	177–46	Aug 2006	Rogers Cup, Montreal (5)	Hard	(Russia) Nadia Petrova	(Zimbabwe) Cara Black (Germany) Anna-Lena Grönefeld	6–1, 6–2

=== Non-Grand Slam mixed doubles finals ===
==== 5 (4 titles, 1 runner-up) ====
Result	W–L	Week	Tournament	Surface	Partner	Opponents	Score
Loss	0–1	Aug 1974	European Amateur Championships; Wrocław, Poland	Clay	(Czechoslovakia) Jan Bedan	(Soviet Union) Olga Morozova (Soviet Union) Alex Metreveli	12–10, 6–8, 6–1
Win	1–1	Oct 1976	World Invitational Tennis Classic; Hilton Head, South Carolina, U.S.	Clay	(Romania) Ilie Năstase	(Sweden) Björn Borg (United Kingdom) Sue Barker	6–3, 6–3
Win	2–1	Nov 1982	World Mixed Doubles Championships; Houston, Texas, U.S.	Hard	(Australia) Peter McNamara	(United States) Sherwood Stewart (United States) JoAnne Russell	6–4, 6–3, 7–6
Win	3–1	Sep 1984	Belgian American Mixed Doubles Classic; Irving, Texas, U.S.	Hard	(Australia) Paul McNamee	(Switzerland) Heinz Günthardt (Hungary) Andrea Temesvári	6–3, 6–2
Win	4–1	Feb 1985	Lipton International Players Championships; Delray Beach, Florida, U.S.	Hard	(Switzerland) Heinz Günthardt	(United States) Mike Bauer (France) Catherine Tanvier	6–2, 6–2

== Grand Slam seedings ==
The tournaments won by Martina are in boldface, and advances into finals by her are in italics.

=== Singles ===
Not seeded at all, or not seeded inside the top 10 Seeded 10–4 Seeded no. 3 Seeded no. 2 Seeded no. 1

Legend (slams won / times seeded) seeded No. 1 (**11** / 22) seeded No. 2 (**5** / 23) seeded No. 3 (**1** / 6) seeded No. 4–10 (**1** / 9) Seeded outside the top 10 (0 / 0) not seeded (0 / 7)	Longest / total: 10 / 67; 6 / 67; 1 / 67; 2 / 67; 0 / 67; 3 / 67

Year	Australian Open	French Open	Wimbledon	US Open
1973	did not play	not seeded	not seeded	not seeded
1974	did not play	6th	not seeded	not seeded
1975	8th (1)	2nd (2)	2nd	3rd
1976	did not play	did not play	3rd	4th
1977	did not play	did not play	2nd	2nd
1978	did not play	did not play	**2nd (1)**	1st
1979	did not play	did not play	**1st (2)**	2nd
1980	1st	did not play	1st	2nd
1981	**3rd (3)**	2nd	4th	4th (3)
1982	1st (4)	**2nd (4)**	**1st (5)**	1st
1983	**1st (6)**	1st	**1st (7)**	**1st (8)**
1984	1st	**1st (9)**	**1st (10)**	**1st (11)**
1985	**2nd (12)**	1st (5)	**2nd (13)**	2nd (6)
1986	tournament not held	1st (7)	**1st (14)**	**1st (15)**
1987	1st (8)	1st (9)	**1st (16)**	**2nd (17)**
1988	2nd	2nd	2nd (10)	2nd
1989	2nd	did not play	2nd (11)	2nd (12)
1990	did not play	did not play	**2nd (18)**	2nd
1991	did not play	did not play	3rd	6th (13)
1992	did not play	did not play	4th	3rd
1993	did not play	did not play	2nd	3rd
1994	did not play	4th	4th (14)	did not play
1995-2003	did not play			
2004	did not play	wild card	wild card	did not play

=== Doubles ===
Not seeded at all, or not seeded inside the top 10 Seeded 10–4 Seeded no. 3 Seeded no. 2 Seeded no. 1

Legend (slams won / times seeded) seeded No. 1 (**23** / 36) seeded No. 2 (**5** / 10) seeded No. 3 (**1** / 4) seeded No. 4–10 (**2** / 20) Seeded outside the top 10 (0 / 2) not seeded (0 / 14)	Longest / total: 11 / 86; 2 / 86; 1 / 86; 3 / 86; 1 / 86; 3 / 86

Year	Australian Open	French Open	Wimbledon	US Open
1973	did not play	not seeded	not seeded	not seeded
1974	did not play	2nd	not seeded	not seeded
1975	not seeded	**2nd (1)**	3rd	1st
1976	did not play	did not play	**2nd (2)**	did not play
1977	did not play	did not play	1st (1)	**1st (3)**
1978	did not play	did not play	1st	**1st (4)**
1979	did not play	did not play	**1st (5)**	2nd (2)
1980	**4th (6)**	did not play	1st	**1st (7)**
1981	1st (3)	3rd	**2nd (8)**	1st
1982	**1st (9)**	**2nd (10)**	**1st (11)**	1st
1983	**1st (12)**	did not play	**1st (13)**	**1st (14)**
1984	**1st (15)**	**1st (16)**	**1st (17)**	**1st (18)**
1985	**1st (19)**	**1st (20)**	1st (4)	1st (5)
1986	tournament not held	**3rd (21)**	**1st (22)**	**1st (23)**
1987	**1st (24)**	**1st (25)**	1st	**1st (26)**
1988	**1st (27)**	**1st (28)**	1st	1st
1989	**1st (29)**	did not play	1st	**6th (30)**
1990	did not play	did not play	2nd	**2nd (31)**
1991	did not play	did not play	8th	2nd
1992	did not play	did not play	4th	4th
1993	did not play			
1994	did not play	4th	4th	did not play
1995	did not play	did not play	did not play	8th
1996-99	did not play			
2000	did not play	wild card	wild card	not seeded
2001	did not play	9th	16th	7th
2002	did not play	wild card	not seeded	not seeded
2003	16th	6th	8th	4th (6)
2004	2nd	5th	3rd	5th
2005	not seeded	wild card	8th	7th
2006	did not play	7th	7th	10th

== WTA Tour career earnings ==
Year	Grand Slam singles titles	WTA singles titles	Total singles titles	Earnings ($)	Money list rank
1973–74	0	1	1	152,118	n/a
1975	0	4	4	173,688	2
1976	0	2	2	128,535	5
1977	0	6	6	300,317	2
1978	1	10	11	450,757	2
1979	1	9	10	618,698	1
1980	0	11	11	749,250	1
1981	1	9	10	865,437	1
1982	2	13	15	1,475,055	1
1983	3	13	16	1,456,030	1
1984	3	10	13	2,173,556	1
1985	2	10	12	1,328,829	1
1986	2	12	14	1,905,841	1
1987	2	2	4	932,102	2
1988	0	9	9	1,333,782	2
1989	0	8	8	975,614	2
1990	1	5	6	1,330,794	3
1991	0	5	5	989,986	4
1992	0	4	4	731,933	5
1993	0	5	5	1,036,119	4
1994	0	1	1	851,082	7
Career	18	149	167	21,626,089	7

== Record against top 10 players ==
Navratilova's record against players who have been ranked in the top 10:

Player	Record	Win%	Hard	Clay	Grass	Carpet	Last Match
Number 1 ranked players							
(United States) Lindsay Davenport	1–0	100%	0–0	0–0	0–0	1–0	Won (1–6, 6–3, 7–5) at 1993 Oakland
(Brazil) Maria Bueno	1–0	100%	1–0	0–0	0–0	0–0	Won (6–2, 6–3) at 1975 Denver
(Spain) Arantxa Sánchez Vicario	12–3	80%	6–0	2–2	1–0	3–1	Lost (6–1, 6–7^{(5–7)}, 6–7^{(3–7)}) at 1994 Oakland
(Australia) Margaret Court	5–2	71%	2–0	1–0	2–1	0–1	Won (5–7, 6–4, 6–4) at 1977 Los Angeles
(United States) Billie Jean King	9–5	64%	1–2	0–0	2–1	6–2	Won (6–3, 7–5) at 1981 Los Angeles
(United States) Tracy Austin	20–13	61%	7–6	3–0	2–0	8–7	Won (5–7, 6–1, 6–0) at 1983 Hilton Head
(Australia) Evonne Goolagong	15–12	56%	5–3	0–4	3–1	7–4	Won (6–0, 3–6, 6–1) at 1982 Sydney
(United States) Chris Evert	43–37	54%	8–8	3–11	10–5	22–13	Won (6–2, 6–2) at 1988 Chicago
(Germany) Steffi Graf	9–9	50%	5–2	0–2	1–2	3–3	Lost (2–6, 4–6) at 1994 Tokyo
(United States) Jennifer Capriati	1–1	50%	0–0	1–0	0–1	0–0	Lost (4–6, 5–7) at 1991 Wimbledon
(Socialist Federal Republic of Yugoslavia) / (Federal Republic of Yugoslavia) / (United States) Monica Seles	7–10	41%	3–2	0–0	0–1	4–7	Won (6–3, 4–6, 7–6^{(7–3)}) at 1993 Paris
Number 2 ranked players							
(United Kingdom) Christine Truman	1–0	100%	0–0	0–0	1–0	0–0	Won (6–1, 6–4) at 1973 Wimbledon
(Czech Republic) Jana Novotná	6–1	86%	2–0	0–0	2–1	2–0	Won (5–7, 6–0, 6–1) at 1994 Wimbledon
(United Kingdom) Virginia Wade	18–6	75%	5–2	1–0	0–2	12–2	Won (6–3, 6–0) at 1985 French Open
(United States) Andrea Jaeger	11–4	73%	1–1	4–0	1–1	5–2	Won (6–0, 6–3) at 1983 Wimbledon
(United States) Nancy Richey	4–2	67%	3–1	1–0	0–0	0–1	Won (5–7, 6–0, 7–5) at 1976 Houston
(Spain) Conchita Martínez	1–4	20%	0–0	1–3	0–1	0–0	Lost (4–6, 6–3, 3–6) at 1994 Wimbledon
Number 3 ranked players							
(South Africa) Amanda Coetzer	4–0	100%	2–0	1–0	1–0	0–0	Won (6–1, 6–1) at 1993 Manhattan Beach
(United States) Pam Shriver	40–3	93%	12–2	3–0	6–1	19–0	Won (6–4, 6–3) at 1992 San Antonio
(France) Nathalie Tauziat	9–1	90%	4–0	1–1	1–0	3–0	Won (6–4, 6–4) at 1993 WTA Finals
(United Kingdom) Sue Barker	17–2	89%	4–1	0–0	4–0	9–1	Won (6–2, 6–0) at 1983 Wightman Cup
(France) Françoise Dürr	6–1	86%	2–1	1–0	1–0	2–0	Won (6–1, 6–1) at 1977 Washington
(Australia) Wendy Turnbull	29–5	85%	6–1	2–1	6–2	15–1	Won (6–2, 6–0) at 1988 Oakland
(Czech Republic) / (Australia) Hana Mandlíková	29–7	81%	9–3	7–0	5–2	8–2	Won (7–5, 6–4) at 1989 Los Angeles
(Soviet Union) Olga Morozova	4–1	80%	1–0	1–1	0–0	2–0	Won (6–4, 6–3) at 1977 Minneapolis
(Bulgaria) / (Switzerland) Manuela Maleeva	11–3	79%	3–1	1–0	2–0	5–2	Won (6–2, 6–3) at 1994 Tokyo
(Argentina) Gabriela Sabatini	15–6	71%	7–0	3–2	2–0	3–4	Lost (4–6, 2–6) at 1994 WTA Finals
(United States) Rosemary Casals	9–4	69%	3–1	2–0	2–0	2–3	Won (6–4, 6–1) at 1981 Surbiton
(France) Mary Pierce	1–1	50%	0–0	0–0	0–0	1–1	Lost (1–6, 6–3, 4–6) at 1993 WTA Finals
Number 4 ranked players							
(United States) Mary Joe Fernández	8–0	100%	0–0	0–0	3–0	5–0	Won (6–2, 3–6, 6–4) at 1991 Milan
(Croatia) Iva Majoli	1–0	100%	0–0	0–0	0–0	1–0	Won (3–6, 6–3, 6–2) at 1993 Oakland
(United States) Zina Garrison	33–1	97%	10–1	2–0	8–0	13–0	Won (6–2, 7–6^{(7–1)}) at 1993 Oakland
(Germany) Claudia Kohde-Kilsch	22–2	92%	1–1	8–0	6–0	7–1	Won (6–2, 6–2) at 1989 Tokyo
(Australia) Dianne Fromholtz	19–4	83%	7–3	2–0	4–0	6–1	Won (6–2, 6–1) at 1987 Wimbledon
(Czech Republic) Helena Suková	26–6	81%	8–2	2–0	5–2	11–2	Won (6–1, 6–2) at 1994 Wimbledon
(Bulgaria) Magdalena Maleeva	4–2	67%	0–1	0–0	1–0	3–1	Won (6–3, 6–4) at 1993 Zurich
(Germany) Anke Huber	1–2	33%	0–2	1–0	0–0	0–0	Lost (3–6, 6–3, 4–6) at 1994 Filderstadt
Number 5 ranked players							
(United Kingdom) Jo Durie	13–0	100%	0–0	1–0	7–0	5–0	Won (6–3, 4–6, 6–2) at 1991 Tokyo
(United States) Kathy Jordan	13–1	93%	3–0	0–0	6–0	4–1	Won (6–3, 6–4) at 1984 Wimbledon
(Germany) Sylvia Hanika	14–2	88%	5–0	2–1	0–0	7–1	Won (6–1, 6–1) at 1988 Montreal
(Netherlands) Betty Stöve	16–3	84%	5–1	0–0	2–2	9–0	Won (6–4, 6–3) at 1981 US Indoors
(Soviet Union) / (Belarus) Natasha Zvereva	8–5	62%	1–2	0–3	4–0	3–0	Won (6–3, 6–1) at 1993 Wimbledon
(United States) Julie Heldman	3–2	60%	1–0	1–1	0–1	1–0	Won (6–2, 6–2) at 1975 Amelia Island
(Slovakia) Daniela Hantuchová	0–1	0%	0–0	0–0	0–1	0–0	Lost (6–2, 2–6, 2–6) at 2002 Eastbourne
Number 6 ranked players							
(Germany) Bettina Bunge	17–0	100%	3–0	2–0	4–0	8–0	Won (6–2, 6–4) at 1986 WTA Finals
(United States) Chanda Rubin	1–0	100%	0–0	1–0	0–0	0–0	Won (6–3, 6–2) at 1994 Amelia Island
(Socialist Federal Republic of Yugoslavia) Mima Jaušovec	21–1	95%	2–0	7–0	2–1	10–0	Won (6–1, 7–5) at 1984 Amelia Island
(Bulgaria) Katerina Maleeva	7–1	88%	1–0	2–1	2–0	2–0	Won (6–0, 4–6, 6–1) at 1993 Chicago
Number 7 ranked players							
(United States) Barbara Potter	18–0	100%	4–0	0–0	3–0	11–0	Won (5–7, 6–2, 6–1) at 1988 Dallas
(South Africa) Greer Stevens	13–0	100%	3–0	0–0	3–0	7–0	Won (4–6, 6–1, 7–6^{(7–3)}) at 1980 Australian Open
(United States) Kathy Rinaldi	7–0	100%	2–0	4–0	1–0	0–0	Won (6–0, 6–1) at 1990 Manhattan Beach
(Hungary) Andrea Temesvári	5–0	100%	2–0	2–0	0–0	1–0	Won (7–5, 6–2) at 1990 Houston
(France) Julie Halard-Decugis	4–0	100%	4–0	0–0	0–0	0–0	Won (7–5, 6–3) at 1994 Paris
(Romania) Irina Spîrlea	1–0	100%	0–0	1–0	0–0	0–0	Won (6–2, 6–3) at 1994 Rome
(Australia) Kerry Reid	9–1	90%	4–0	0–1	0–0	5–0	Won (6–3, 6–0) at 1980 Colgate Championships
Number 8 ranked players							
(Romania) Virginia Ruzici	13–0	100%	3–0	2–0	1–0	7–0	Won (6–3, 6–1) at 1984 WTA Finals
(Canada) Carling Bassett-Seguso	6–0	100%	2–0	0–0	1–0	3–0	Won (6–0, 6–3) at 1986 Washington
(United States) Bonnie Gadusek	4–0	100%	1–0	1–0	0–0	2–0	Won (6–3, 6–4) at 1986 WTA Finals
(Japan) Ai Sugiyama	1–0	100%	0–0	0–0	0–0	1–0	Won (6–3, 3–6, 6–3) at 1993 Tokyo
Number 9 ranked players							
(United States) Lori McNeil	12–0	100%	1–0	1–0	2–0	8–0	Won (5–7, 7–6^{(9–7)}, 6–4) at 1994 Filderstadt
(United States) Lisa Bonder	6–0	100%	2–0	1–0	1–0	2–0	Won (6–2, 6–1) at 1987 US Open
(Netherlands) Brenda Schultz-McCarthy	4–0	100%	0–0	0–0	2–0	2–0	Won (6–1, 6–2) at 1991 Eastbourne
Number 10 ranked players							
(Sweden) Catarina Lindqvist	14–0	100%	7–0	1–0	3–0	3–0	Won (6–1, 6–3) at 1991 Wimbledon
(United States) Kristien Shaw	4–0	100%	0–0	0–0	1–0	3–0	Won (2–6, 9–8^{(7–4)}, 7–5) at 1977 Edinburgh
(United States) Stephanie Rehe	3–0	100%	2–0	0–0	0–0	1–0	Won (6–1, 6–3) at 1990 Tokyo
(Austria) Barbara Paulus	2–0	100%	1–0	1–0	0–0	0–0	Won (6–4, 6–1) at 1989 Fed Cup
(United States) Kathleen Horvath	10–1	91%	2–0	4–1	0–0	4–0	Won (6–3, 6–1) at 1988 Amelia Island
(United States) Kathy May	5–1	83%	1–0	1–0	1–0	2–1	Won (6–3, 6–0) at 1979 San Jose
Total	706–179	80%	190–50 (79%)	89–35 (72%)	128–29 (82%)	299–65 (82%)	

== See also ==
- Evert–Navratilova rivalry
- Graf–Navratilova rivalry
