= 1978 Virginia Slims of Kansas =

- Date: February 27 – March 5
- Edition: 1st
- Category: Virginia Slims circuit
- Draw: 32S / 15D
- Prize money: $100,000
- Surface: Carpet (Sporteze) / indoor
- Location: Kansas City, Missouri, U.S.
- Venue: Municipal Auditorium

Champions

Singles
- (United States) Martina Navratilova

Doubles
- (United States) Billie Jean King / (United States) Martina Navratilova
Virginia Slims of Kansas	· 1980 →

The 1978 Virginia Slims of Kansas was a women's tennis tournament played on indoor carpet courts at the Municipal Auditorium in Kansas City, Missouri in the United States that was part of the 1978 Virginia Slims World Championship Series. It was the first edition of the tournament and was held from February 27 through March 5, 1978. First-seeded Martina Navratilova won the singles title and earned $20,000 first-prize money.

== Finals ==
=== Singles ===
(United States) Martina Navratilova defeated (United States) Billie Jean King 7–5, 2–6, 6–3

- It was Navratilova's 7th singles title of the year and the 20th of her career.

=== Doubles ===
(United States) Billie Jean King / (United States) Martina Navratilova defeated (Australia) Kerry Melville / (Australia) Wendy Turnbull 6–4, 6–4

== Prize money ==
Event	W	F	SF	QF	Round of 16	Round of 32
Singles	$20,000	$10,500	$5,900	$2,800	$1,550	$850
