= 1981 Avon Championships of Kansas – Singles =

Singles
- 1981 Avon Championships of Kansas

Final
- Champion: (United States) Andrea Jaeger
- Runner-up: (United States) Martina Navratilova
- Score: 6–3, 3–6, 7–5

Details
- Draw: 32
- Seeds: 8

Events
Singles	Doubles
- Virginia Slims of Kansas

Martina Navratilova was the defending champion.

Second-seeded Andrea Jaeger won the title, defeating top-seeded Martina Navratilova in the final 6–3, 3–6, 7–5.

== Seeds ==
A champion seed is indicated in bold text while text in italics indicates the round in which that seed was eliminated.

1. (United States) Martina Navratilova (final)
2. (United States) **Andrea Jaeger (champion)**
3. (Australia) Wendy Turnbull (second round)
4. (Romania) Virginia Ruzici (quarterfinals)
5. (West Germany) Sylvia Hanika (quarterfinals)
6. (United Kingdom) Virginia Wade (second round)
7. (Socialist Federal Republic of Yugoslavia) Mima Jaušovec (quarterfinals)
8. (United States) Terry Holladay (first round)

== Draw ==
Key

- Q = Qualifier
- WC = Wild card
- LL = Lucky loser
- Alt = Alternate
- ITF = ITF entry
- PR = Protected ranking
- SR = Special ranking
- SE = Special exempt
- JE = Junior exempt
- JR = Junior Accelerator Programme entrant
- CO = College Accelerator Programme entrant
- NG = Next Gen Accelerator Program entrant
- w/o = Walkover
- r = Retired
- d = Defaulted

=== Final ===
Semifinals
1	(United States) **Martina Navratilova**	**6**	**6**
(United States) Barbara Potter	3	2
4	(Romania) Virginia Ruzici	2	3
2	(United States) **Andrea Jaeger**	**6**	**6**

Final
1	(United States) Martina Navratilova	3	**6**	5
2	(United States) **Andrea Jaeger**	**6**	3	**7**

=== Top half ===
First round
1	**(United States) Martina Navratilova**	**6**	**6**
(United States) Anne Smith	3	1
(United States) Wendy White	4	**6**	2
(United States) **Sherry Acker**	**6**	3	**6**
(United States) **Kate Latham**	**6**	4	**7**
(United States) Ann Kiyomura	4	**6**	4
(United States) **Pam Teeguarden**	**6**	1	**6**
8	(United States) Terry Holladay	4	**6**	1
3	(Australia) **Wendy Turnbull**	**6**	**6**
(South Africa) Yvonne Vermaak	3	3
(United States) **Barbara Potter**	**6**	**6**
(United States) Barbara Hallquist	4	1
(United States) **Sandy Collins**	**6**	**6**
(South Africa) Rosalyn Fairbank	4	3
(United States) Sharon Walsh	1	4
6	(United Kingdom) **Virginia Wade**	**6**	**6**

Second round
1	**(United States) M Navratilova**	**6**	**6**
(United States) S Acker	4	2
(United States) **K Latham**	**6**	**6**
(United States) P Teeguarden	4	4
3	(Australia) W Turnbull	6	0
(United States) **B Potter**	**7**	**6**
(United States) **S Collins**	**6**	**6**
6	(United Kingdom) Virginia Wade	4	0

Quarterfinals
1	**(United States) M Navratilova**	**6**	**6**
(United States) Kate Latham	3	2
(United States) **B Potter**	**6**	**6**
(United States) S Collins	3	3

Semifinals
1	**(United States) M Navratilova**	**6**	**6**
(United States) B Potter	3	2

=== Bottom half ===
First round
7	**(Socialist Federal Republic of Yugoslavia) Mima Jaušovec**	**6**	**6**
(Romania) Lucia Romanov	4	3
(United States) **Susan Mascarin**	**6**	**6**
(United States) Caroline Stoll	3	0
(United States) **Kathleen Cummings**	**6**	**6**
(United States) Laura duPont	1	3
(United States) Barbara Jordan	1	1
4	(Romania) **Virginia Ruzici**	**6**	**6**
5	**(West Germany) Sylvia Hanika**	**6**	**6**
(United States) Mary-Lou Piatek	0	3
(United States) **Peanut Louie**	**7**	**6**
(United States) Betsy Nagelsen	6	0
**(United States) JoAnne Russell**	**6**	**6**
(United States) Stacy Margolin	4	0
(United States) Candy Reynolds	3	1
2	(United States) **Andrea Jaeger**	**6**	**6**

Second round
7	(Socialist Federal Republic of Yugoslavia) **M Jaušovec**	**6**	3	**6**
(United States) S Mascarin	1	**6**	2
(United States) K Cummings	2	4
4	(Romania) **V Ruzici**	**6**	**6**
5	(West Germany) **S Hanika**	**6**	**6**
(United States) P Louie	3	0
(United States) J Russell	1	1
2	(United States) **A Jaeger**	**6**	**6**

Quarterfinals
7	(Socialist Federal Republic of Yugoslavia) M Jaušovec	3	4
4	**(Romania) V Ruzici**	**6**	**6**
5	(West Germany) S Hanika	2	5
2	(United States) **A Jaeger**	**6**	**7**

Semifinals
4	(Romania) V Ruzici	2	3
2	(United States) **A Jaeger**	**6**	**6**
