= 1980 Avon Championships of Kansas =

Tennis tournament

- Date: 14–20 January
- Edition: 2nd
- Category: Avon Championships circuit
- Draw: 32S / 16D
- Prize money: $125,000
- Surface: Carpet (Sporteze) / indoor
- Location: Kansas City, Missouri, U.S.
- Venue: Municipal Auditorium

Champions

Singles
- (United States) Martina Navratilova

Doubles
- (United States) Billie Jean King / (United States) Martina Navratilova
← 1978 ·	Virginia Slims of Kansas	· 1981 →

The 1980 Avon Championships of Kansas was a women's tennis tournament played on indoor carpet courts at the Municipal Auditorium in Kansas City, Missouri in the United States that was part of the 1980 Virginia Slims World Championship Series. It was the second edition of the tournament and was held from January 14 through January 20, 1980. First-seeded Martina Navratilova won the singles title and earned $24,000 first-prize money.

== Finals ==
=== Singles ===
(United States) Martina Navratilova defeated (South Africa) Greer Stevens 6–0, 6–2

- It was Navratilova's 2nd singles title of the year and the 36th of her career.

=== Doubles ===
(United States) Billie Jean King / (United States) Martina Navratilova defeated (United States) Laura duPont / (United States) Pam Shriver 6–3, 6–1

== Prize money ==
Event	W	F	SF	QF	Round of 16	Round of 32
Singles	$24,000	$12,000	$6,350	$3,000	$1,600	$900
