= 1981 Avon Championships of Kansas =

- Date: 12–18 January
- Edition: 3rd
- Category: Avon Championships circuit
- Draw: 33S / 16D
- Prize money: $150,000
- Surface: Carpet (Sporteze) / indoor
- Location: Kansas City, Missouri, U.S.
- Venue: Municipal Auditorium

Champions

Singles
- (United States) Andrea Jaeger

Doubles
- (United States) Barbara Potter / (United States) Sharon Walsh
← 1980 ·	Virginia Slims of Kansas	· 1982 →

The 1981 Avon Championships of Kansas was a women's tennis tournament played on indoor carpet courts at the Municipal Auditorium in Kansas City, Missouri in the United States that was part of the 1981 Virginia Slims World Championship Series. It was the third edition of the tournament and was held from January 12 through January 18, 1981. Second-seeded Andrea Jaeger won the singles title and earned $30,000 first-prize money.

== Finals ==
=== Singles ===
(United States) Andrea Jaeger defeated (United States) Martina Navratilova 3–6, 6–3, 7–5

- It was Jaeger's 1st singles title of the year and the 5th of her career.

=== Doubles ===
(United States) Barbara Potter / (United States) Sharon Walsh defeated (United States) Rosemary Casals / (Australia) Wendy Turnbull 6–2, 7–6^{(7–4)}

== Prize money ==
Event	W	F	SF	QF	Round of 16	Round of 32	Prel. round
Singles	$30,000	$15,000	$7,350	$3,600	$1,900	$1,100	$700
