= 1986 Virginia Slims Championships =

- Date: March and November
- Edition: 15th and 16th
- Location: New York City, US

Champions

Singles
- (United States) Martina Navratilova
← 1985 ·	Virginia Slims Championships	· 1987 →

The Virginia Slims Championships was held twice in 1986 because of a change of schedule from March to November.

They were the fifteenth and sixteenth season-ending WTA Tour Championships, the annual tennis tournament for the best female tennis players in singles on the 1986 WTA Tour. It was held in March 1986 and November 1986, in New York City, United States.

== Champions ==
=== March ===
- Singles: (United States) Martina Navratilova defeated (Czechoslovakia) Hana Mandlíková, 6–2, 6–0, 3–6, 6–1. Navratilova was the defending champion.
- Doubles: (Czechoslovakia) Hana Mandlíková and (Australia) Wendy Turnbull defeated (West Germany) Claudia Kohde-Kilsch and (Czechoslovakia) Helena Suková, 6–4, 6–7^{(4–7)}, 6–3.

=== November ===
- Singles: (United States) Martina Navratilova defeated (West Germany) Steffi Graf, 7–6^{(8–6)}, 6–3, 6–2. Navratilova was the defending champion.
- Doubles: (United States) Martina Navratilova and (United States) Pam Shriver defeated (West Germany) Claudia Kohde-Kilsch and (Czechoslovakia) Helena Suková, 7–6^{(7–1)}, 6–3.
