= Evert–Navratilova rivalry =

Tennis rivalry

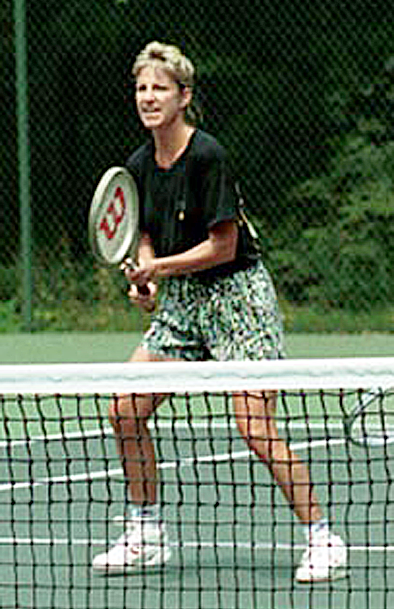
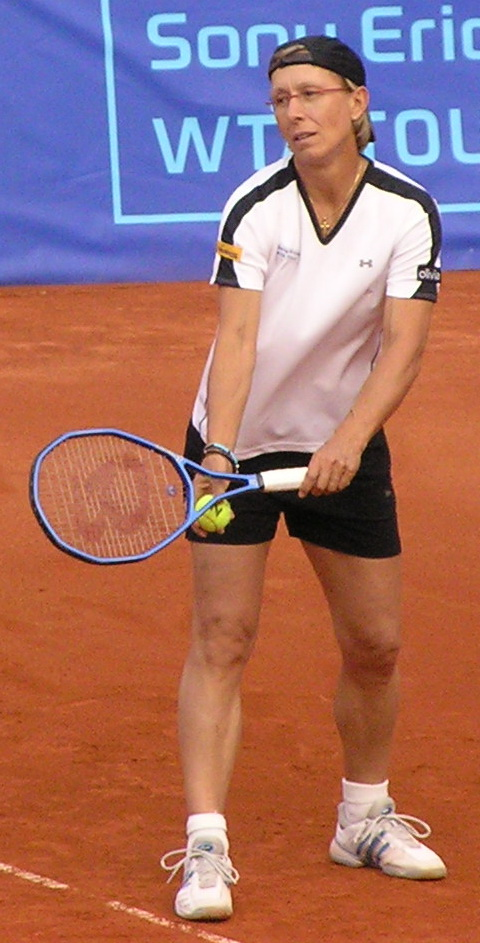
Chris Evert (left) and Martina Navratilova (right) each won 18 major singles titles.

The Evert–Navratilova rivalry was a tennis rivalry in the 1970s and 1980s between Chris Evert and Martina Navratilova, widely regarded as two of the greatest tennis players of all time. It is considered one of the greatest rivalries in tennis history and sports in general. The pair contested 80 matches between 1973 and 1988 (60 of which were finals), with Navratilova leading the overall head-to-head 43–37 and 36–24 in finals. It is the most prolific tennis rivalry of the Open Era.

In the 12 years following the introduction of the WTA rankings in November 1975 until August 1987, one of the two held the world No. 1 position in all but 23 weeks. More specifically, in the first 615 weeks of the WTA rankings they collectively held the No. 1 ranking for 592 weeks, Navratilova at 332 weeks and Evert at 260 weeks. Such was their dominance over other players, that for the period 1977–1987 when the two rivals were first ranked world No. 1 and No. 2, only three players beat them both back-to-back in the same tournament. (Evonne Goolagong Cawley at the 1978 Virginia Slims of Boston, Tracy Austin took three victories over both players at the 1979 US Open, the 1981 Canadian Open and the 1981 Toyota Series Championships; and Hana Mandlíková at the 1985 US Open). From the 1981 Australian Open to the 1985 Wimbledon Championships, the duo won a record 15 consecutive major singles titles.

Evert and Navratilova encountered each other most often on the faster court surfaces (grass and indoors), where Navratilova's offensive serve-and-volley style of play gave her the upper hand over Evert's counter-attacking baseline approach. Evert enjoyed more success in the rivalry on hard courts and especially on clay courts. Navratilova led Evert 10–5 on grass, 9–7 on outdoor hard courts, and 21–14 on indoor courts, but Evert led 11–3 on clay courts. Evert led their head-to-head in three-set match wins 15–14, but Navratilova led 29–22 in straight-set encounters. Navratilova was most dominant in encounters in majors, leading 14–8 overall and 10–4 in finals. Evert led their head-to-head for each of the first six years of their rivalry (1973–78), whereas Navratilova had the upper hand for each year in the rest of their rivalry (1979, 1981–88).

Following their retirements, they became close friends.

== Grand Slam matches ==
- Final matches indicated in **bold**.

Tournament	1975	1976	1977	1978	1979	1980	1981	1982	1983	1984	1985	1986	1987	1988
French Open	**E**									**N**	**E**	**E**	N	
Wimbledon		E		**N**	**N**	E		**N**		**N**	**N**		N	N
US Open	E						N		**N**	**N**				
Australian Open							**N**	**E**			**N**			E

== Famous matches ==
=== 1978 Wimbledon final ===
Navratilova won their 26th match in the final of the 1978 Wimbledon Championships. Evert won the first set, and was cruising in the second, until Navratilova rallied back and won the match in three sets. The third set was a classic combination of a see-saw battle and a contrast in styles between the two players. Navratilova won 12 of the last 13 points for the title, winning the third set 7–5. It is considered to be one of the best finals in Wimbledon history.

=== 1981 Australian Open final ===
In their 45th encounter, Evert and Navratilova played a three-set epic in the final of the 1981 Australian Open. In his book, tennis historian Steve Flink ranks it as one of their two most significant matches, alongside the 1985 French Open final. Navratilova won the match despite dropping the opening set, winning the final set 7–5. Evert considered the match to be one of her toughest losses. The tournament was played on grass.

=== 1982 Australian Open final ===
In a rematch of the previous year's final, Evert beat Navratilova in three sets at the 1982 Australian Open. It was a straightforward match, with Evert claiming the first set 6–3, Navratilova the second set 6–2, and Evert finally winning with a third set score of 6–3. With her win, Evert achieved the career Grand Slam. Like the previous year's final, the match was played on grass.

=== 1984 US Open final ===
In their 61st encounter, Navratilova won in three sets at the 1984 US Open final. Navratilova was on a 54-match winning streak coming into the match, one shy of Evert's then-Open Era record 55-match streak; she would eventually extend the record to 74 matches won in a row, a record that still stands. Navratilova dropped the first set, yet rallied to win the next two to win the US Open. It is considered to be one of the best matches in US Open history. Evert later said that "It was the most devastated I've ever felt over a tennis match."

=== 1985 French Open final ===
In their 65th and perhaps greatest encounter, Evert and Navratilova played a three-set epic in the final of the 1985 French Open. It was a rematch of the previous year's final at the 1984 French Open, which Navratilova won in straight sets. Evert won to reclaim the No. 1 ranking from Navratilova. Evert won the first set 6–3, before Navratilova rallied from down 2–4, 0–40 in the second set to force a third. In the deciding set, Evert let a 5–3 lead slip away, before eventually winning the third set 7–5. It is considered to be one of the greatest major finals in history. Evert considers it her favorite win over Navratilova, as she was the underdog and Navratilova had recently strung together many wins over Evert. It is one of the two matches that tennis historian Steve Flink considers the most significant in their rivalry, alongside the 1981 Australian Open final. Frank Deford described the match as the "finest match of their long rivalry".

== Head-to-head breakdown ==
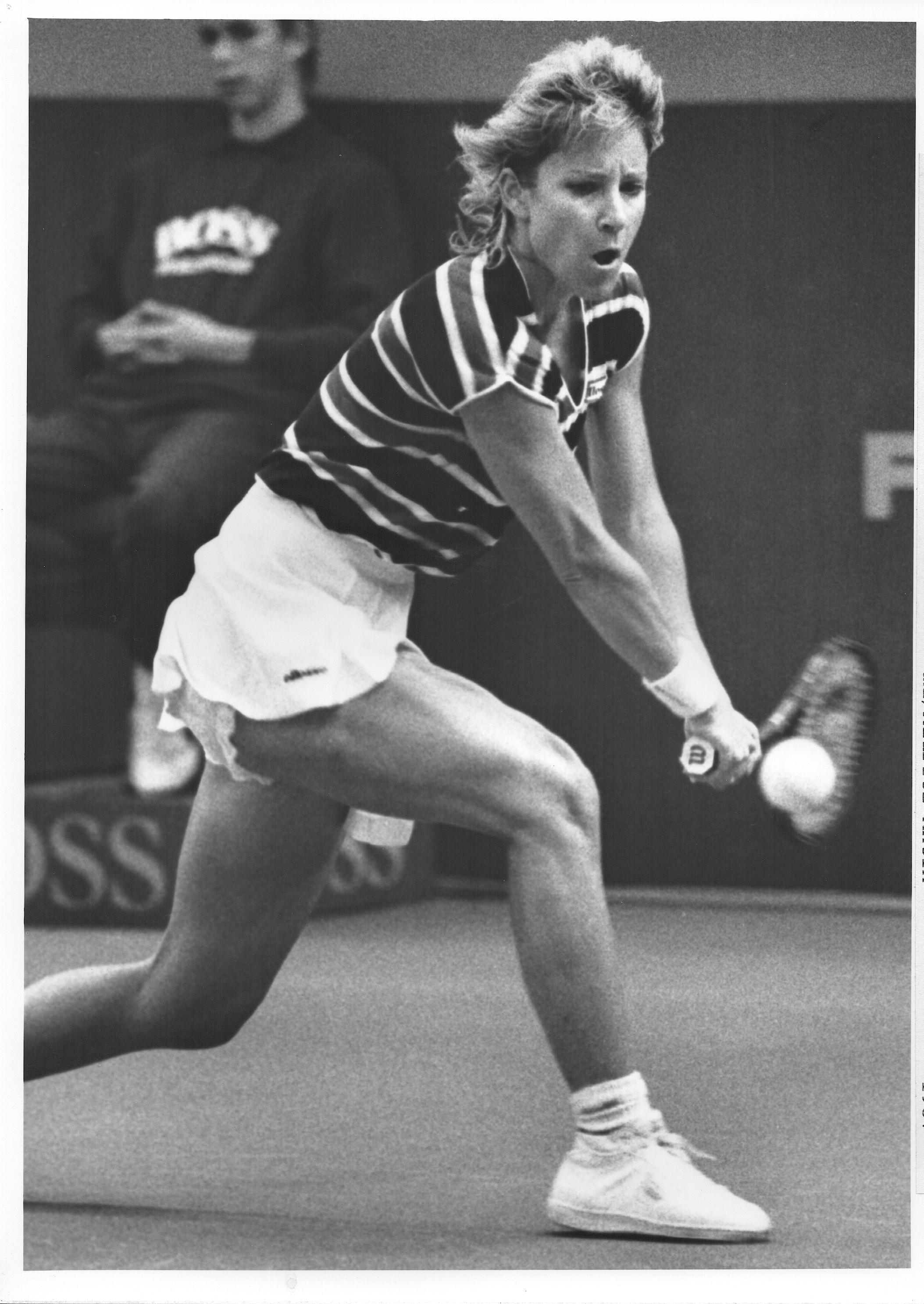
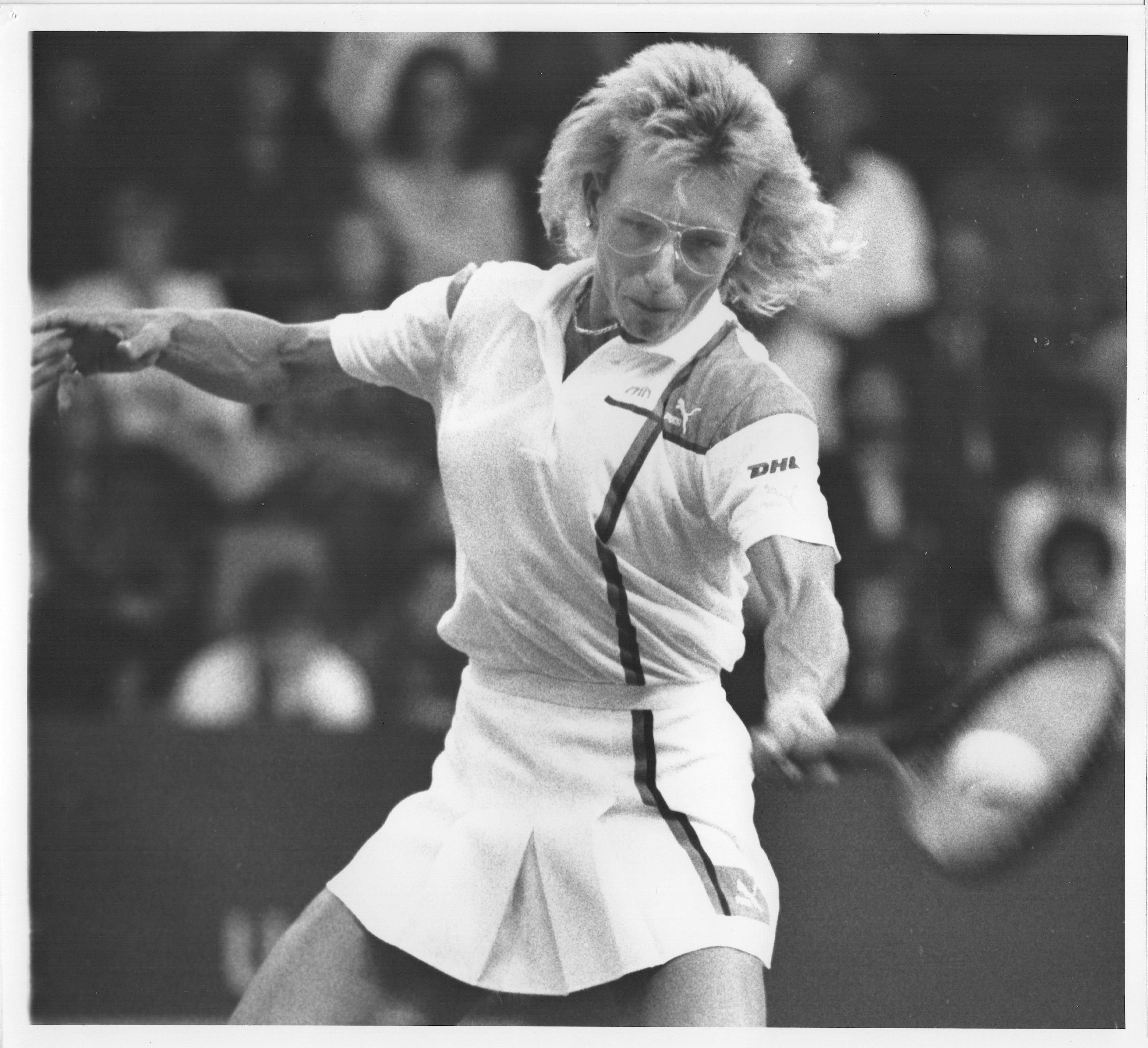
Chris Evert (left) and Martina Navratilova (right) at the 1987 Porsche Tennis Grand Prix, where they met in the final.
- All matches: (**80**) Navratilova 43–37
- All finals: (**60**) Navratilova 36–24
- Grand Slam matches: Navratilova 14–8
- Grand Slam finals: Navratilova 10–4
- Grand Slam semifinals: Tied 4–4
- WTA Tour Championships finals: Navratilova 2–1
- Other finals: Navratilova 24–19
- Three-set matches: Evert 15–14
- Straight-set matches: Navratilova 29–22

=== Results on each surface ===
- Hard courts: Tied 8–8
- Clay courts: Evert 11–3
- Grass courts: Navratilova 10–5
- Carpet courts: Navratilova 22–13

	Hard Court		Clay		Grass		Carpet		Total	
	Evert	Navratilova	Evert	Navratilova	Evert	Navratilova	Evert	Navratilova	Evert	Navratilova
Australian Open	1	0			1	2			2	2
French Open			3	2					3	2
Wimbledon					2	7			2	7
US Open	0	3	1	0					1	3
Virginia Slims Championships							1	2	1	2
Toyota Championships	2	0					0	1	2	1
Amelia Island			1	1					1	1
WTA Atlanta	1	0					1	0	2	0
Brighton International							1	2	1	2
Canadian Open	0	1							0	1
Eastbourne International					1	1			1	1
Charleston Open			1	0					1	0
Italian Open			2	0					2	0
L'Eggs World Series	2	0							2	0
Lion's Cup							1	3	1	3
Miami Open	0	1							0	1
Eckerd Open			1	0					1	0
Stuttgart Open							0	2	0	2
Sydney International					1	0			1	0
US Indoors							0	1	0	1
Virginia Slims of Akron							2	0	2	0
Virginia Slims of California							2	1	2	1
Virginia Slims of Chicago							0	3	0	3
Virginia Slims of Dallas							0	4	0	4
Virginia Slims of Florida	1	0							1	0
Virginia Slims of Houston			2	0			0	1	2	1
Virginia Slims of Los Angeles	1	2					2	0	3	2
Virginia Slims of Philadelphia							2	0	2	0
Virginia Slims of Phoenix	0	1							0	1
Virginia Slims of Seattle							1	0	1	0
Virginia Slims of Washington							0	2	0	2
Total	8	8	11	3	5	10	13	22	37	43

== List of all matches ==
WTA, Fed Cup, and Grand Slam main draw results included.

Martina Navratilova leads the head-to-head 43–37. Walkovers are not counted as official wins or losses.

Legend	Evert	Navratilova
Grand Slam	8	14
Virginia Slims Championships	1	2
Toyota Championships	2	1
Tour Events	26	26
**Total**	**37**	**43**

=== Singles: 80 ===
Evert 37 – Navratilova 43

No.	Year	Tournament	Surface	Round	Winner	Score	Evert	Navratilova
1.	1973	Virginia Slims of Akron	Carpet	Round of 16	Evert	7–6^{(5–4)}, 6–3	**1**	0
2.	1973	Eckerd Open	Clay	Semifinals	Evert	7–5, 6–3	**2**	0
3.	1974	Virginia Slims of California	Carpet	Round of 32	Evert	6–7, 6–3, 6–1	**3**	0
4.	1974	Italian Open	Clay	Final	Evert	6–3, 6–3	**4**	0
5.	1975	Virginia Slims of California	Carpet	Semifinals	Evert	6–4, 6–3	**5**	0
6.	1975	Virginia Slims of Washington	Carpet	Quarterfinals	Navratilova	3–6, 6–4, 7–6^{(5–4)}	5	**1**
7.	1975	Virginia Slims of Akron	Carpet	Quarterfinals	Evert	6–3, 6–1	**6**	1
8.	1975	Virginia Slims of Chicago	Carpet	Semifinals	Navratilova	6–4, 6–0	6	**2**
9.	1975	Virginia Slims of Philadelphia	Carpet	Semifinals	Evert	7–6, 6–4	**7**	2
10.	1975	Virginia Slims Championships	Carpet	Final	Evert	6–4, 6–2	**8**	2
11.	1975	Charleston Open	Clay	Final	Evert	7–5, 6–4	**9**	2
12.	1975	Italian Open	Clay	Final	Evert	6–1, 6–0	**10**	2
13.	1975	Roland Garros	Clay	Final	Evert	2–6, 6–2, 6–1	**11**	2
14.	1975	US Open	Clay	Semifinals	Evert	6–4, 6–4	**12**	2
15.	1975	WTA Atlanta	Hard (i)	Final	Evert	2–6, 6–2, 6–0	**13**	2
16.	1976	L'Eggs World Series	Hard	Semifinals	Evert	6–0, 6–3	**14**	2
17.	1976	Virginia Slims of Houston	Carpet	Final	Navratilova	6–3, 6–4	14	**3**
18.	1976	Wimbledon	Grass	Semifinals	Evert	6–3, 4–6, 6–4	**15**	3
19.	1977	Virginia Slims of Washington	Carpet	Final	Navratilova	6–2, 6–3	15	**4**
20.	1977	Virginia Slims of Seattle	Carpet	Final	Evert	6–2, 6–4	**16**	4
21.	1977	Virginia Slims of Los Angeles	Carpet	Final	Evert	6–2, 2–6, 6–1	**17**	4
22.	1977	Virginia Slims of Philadelphia	Carpet	Final	Evert	6–4, 4–6, 6–3	**18**	4
23.	1977	L'Eggs World Series	Hard (i)	Final	Evert	6–3, 7–6^{(5–3)}	**19**	4
24.	1977	Toyota Championships	Hard	Round of 32	Evert	6–4, 6–1	**20**	4
25.	1978	Eastbourne International	Grass	Final	Navratilova	6–4, 4–6, 9–7	20	**5**
26.	1978	Wimbledon	Grass	Final	Navratilova	2–6, 6–4, 7–5	20	**6**
27.	1978	WTA Atlanta	Carpet	Final	Evert	7–6^{(7–3)}, 0–6, 6–3	**21**	6
28.	1978	Toyota Championships	Hard	Final	Evert	6–3, 6–3	**22**	6
29.	1978	Lion's Cup	Carpet	Final	Evert	7–5, 6–2	**23**	6
30.	1979	Virginia Slims of California	Carpet	Final	Navratilova	7–5, 7–5	23	**7**
31.	1979	Virginia Slims of Los Angeles	Carpet	Final	Evert	6–3, 6–4	**24**	7
32.	1979	Virginia Slims of Dallas	Carpet	Final	Navratilova	6–4, 6–4	24	**8**
33.	1979	Eastbourne International	Grass	Final	Evert	7–5, 5–7, 13–11	**25**	8
34.	1979	Wimbledon	Grass	Final	Navratilova	6–4, 6–4	25	**9**
35.	1979	Virginia Slims of Phoenix	Hard	Final	Navratilova	6–1, 6–3	25	**10**
36.	1979	Brighton International	Carpet	Final	Navratilova	6–3, 6–3	25	**11**
37.	1980	Virginia Slims of Chicago	Carpet	Final	Navratilova	6–4, 6–4	25	**12**
38.	1980	Wimbledon	Grass	Semifinals	Evert	4–6, 6–4, 6–2	**26**	12
39.	1980	Brighton International	Carpet	Final	Evert	6–4, 5–7, 6–3	**27**	12
40.	1980	Lion's Cup	Carpet	Semifinals	Navratilova	7–6, 6–2	27	**13**
41.	1981	Amelia Island Championships	Clay	Final	Evert	6–0, 6–0	**28**	13
42.	1981	US Open	Hard	Semifinals	Navratilova	7–5, 4–6, 6–4	28	**14**
43.	1981	Lion's Cup	Carpet	Final	Navratilova	6–3, 6–2	28	**15**
44.	1981	Sydney International	Grass	Final	Evert	6–4, 2–6, 6–1	**29**	15
45.	1981	Australian Open	Grass	Final	Navratilova	6–7^{(4–7)}, 6–4, 7–5	29	**16**
46.	1982	Wimbledon	Grass	Final	Navratilova	6–1, 3–6, 6–2	29	**17**
47.	1982	Brighton International	Carpet	Final	Navratilova	6–1, 6–4	29	**18**
48.	1982	Australian Open	Grass	Final	Evert	6–3, 2–6, 6–3	**30**	18
49.	1982	Toyota Championships	Carpet	Final	Navratilova	4–6, 6–1, 6–2	30	**19**
50.	1983	Virginia Slims of Dallas	Carpet	Final	Navratilova	6–4, 6–0	30	**20**
51.	1983	Virginia Slims Championships	Carpet	Final	Navratilova	6–2, 6–0	30	**21**
52.	1983	Virginia Slims of Los Angeles	Hard	Final	Navratilova	6–1, 6–3	30	**22**
53.	1983	Canadian Open	Hard	Final	Navratilova	6–4, 4–6, 6–1	30	**23**
54.	1983	US Open	Hard	Final	Navratilova	6–1, 6–3	30	**24**
55.	1983	Lion's Cup	Carpet	Final	Navratilova	6–2, 6–2	30	**25**
56.	1984	US Indoor Championships	Carpet	Final	Navratilova	6–2, 7–6^{(7–4)}	30	**26**
57.	1984	Virginia Slims Championships	Carpet	Final	Navratilova	6–3, 7–5, 6–1	30	**27**
58.	1984	Amelia Island Championships	Clay	Final	Navratilova	6–2, 6–0	30	**28**
59.	1984	Roland Garros	Clay	Final	Navratilova	6–3, 6–1	30	**29**
60.	1984	Wimbledon	Grass	Final	Navratilova	7–6^{(7–5)}, 6–2	30	**30**
61.	1984	US Open	Hard	Final	Navratilova	4–6, 6–4, 6–4	30	**31**
62.	1985	Virginia Slims of Florida	Hard	Final	Evert	6–2, 6–4	**31**	31
63.	1985	Miami Open	Hard	Final	Navratilova	6–2, 6–4	31	**32**
64.	1985	Virginia Slims of Dallas	Carpet	Final	Navratilova	6–3, 6–4	31	**33**
65.	1985	Roland Garros	Clay	Final	Evert	6–3, 6–7^{(4–7)}, 7–5	**32**	33
66.	1985	Wimbledon	Grass	Final	Navratilova	4–6, 6–3, 6–2	32	**34**
67.	1985	Australian Open	Grass	Final	Navratilova	6–2, 4–6, 6–2	32	**35**
68.	1986	Virginia Slims of Dallas	Carpet	Final	Navratilova	6–2, 6–1	32	**36**
69.	1986	Roland Garros	Clay	Final	Evert	2–6, 6–3, 6–3	**33**	36
70.	1986	Virginia Slims of Los Angeles	Hard	Final	Navratilova	7–6^{(7–5)}, 6–3	33	**37**
71.	1987	Virginia Slims of Houston	Clay	Final	Evert	3–6, 6–1, 7–6^{(7–4)}	**34**	37
72.	1987	Roland Garros	Clay	Semifinals	Navratilova	6–2, 6–2	34	**38**
73.	1987	Wimbledon	Grass	Semifinals	Navratilova	6–2, 5–7, 6–4	34	**39**
74.	1987	Virginia Slims of Los Angeles	Hard	Semifinals	Evert	6–2, 6–1	**35**	39
75.	1987	Stuttgart Open	Carpet	Final	Navratilova	7–5, 6–1	35	**40**
76.	1988	Australian Open	Hard	Semifinals	Evert	6–2, 7–5	**36**	40
77.	1988	Virginia Slims of Houston	Clay	Final	Evert	6–0, 6–4	**37**	40
78.	1988	Wimbledon	Grass	Semifinals	Navratilova	6–1, 4–6, 7–5	37	**41**
79.	1988	Stuttgart Open	Carpet	Final	Navratilova	6–2, 6–3	37	**42**
80.	1988	Virginia Slims of Chicago	Carpet	Final	Navratilova	6–2, 6–2	37	**43**

== Grand Slam performance timeline comparison ==
For all players in their era see: Tennis performance timeline comparison (women) (1978–present)

=== 1971–1977 ===
Player	1971				1972				1973				1974				1975				1976				1977				
Player	AUS	FRA	WIM	USA	AUS	FRA	WIM	USA	AUS	FRA	WIM	USA	AUS	FRA	WIM	USA	AUS	FRA	WIM	USA	AUS	FRA	WIM	USA	AUS^{J}	FRA	WIM	USA	AUS^{D}
(Czechoslovakia) Martina Navratilova	–	–	–	–	–	–	–	–	A	QF	3R	1R	A	QF	1R	3R	F	F	QF	SF	A	A	SF	1R	A	A	QF	SF	A
(United States) Chris Evert	A	A	A	SF	A	A	SF	SF	A	F	F	SF	F	**W**	**W**	SF	A	**W**	SF	**W**	A	A	**W**	**W**	A	A	SF	**W**	A

- The Australian Open was held twice in 1977, in January (J) and December (D).

=== 1978–1984 ===
Player	1978				1979				1980				1981				1982				1983				1984			
Player	FRA	WIM	USA	AUS	FRA	WIM	USA	AUS	FRA	WIM	USA	AUS	FRA	WIM	USA	AUS	FRA	WIM	USA	AUS	FRA	WIM	USA	AUS	FRA	WIM	USA	AUS
(United States) Martina Navratilova	A	**W**	SF	A	A	**W**	SF	A	A	SF	4R	SF	QF	SF	F	**W**	**W**	**W**	QF	F	4R	**W**	**W**	**W**	**W**	**W**	**W**	SF
(United States) Chris Evert	A	F	**W**	A	**W**	F	F	A	**W**	F	**W**	A	SF	**W**	SF	F	SF	F	**W**	**W**	**W**	3R	F	A	F	F	F	**W**

=== 1985–1991 ===
Player	1985				1986			1987				1988				1989				1990				1991			
Player	FRA	WIM	USA	AUS	FRA	WIM	USA	AUS	FRA	WIM	USA	AUS	FRA	WIM	USA	AUS	FRA	WIM	USA	AUS	FRA	WIM	USA	AUS	FRA	WIM	USA
(United States) Martina Navratilova	F	**W**	F	**W**	F	**W**	**W**	F	F	**W**	**W**	SF	4R	F	QF	QF	A	F	F	A	A	**W**	4R	A	A	QF	F
(United States) Chris Evert	**W**	F	SF	F	**W**	SF	SF	A	SF	SF	QF	F	3R	SF	SF	A	A	SF	QF	Retired							

=== 1992–2006 ===
Player	1992				1993				1994				1995 to 2003				2004				2005				2006			
Player	AUS	FRA	WIM	USA	AUS	FRA	WIM	USA	AUS	FRA	WIM	USA	AUS	FRA	WIM	USA	AUS	FRA	WIM	USA	AUS	FRA	WIM	USA	AUS	FRA	WIM	USA
(United States) Martina Navratilova	A	A	SF	2R	A	A	SF	4R	A	1R	F	A	Retired				A	1R	2R	A	A	A	A	A	Retired			
(United States) Chris Evert	Retired																											

== WTA rankings ==
=== Year-end ranking timeline ===
Player	1972	1973	1974	1975	1976	1977	1978	1979	1980	1981	1982	1983	1984	1985	1986	1987	1988	1989	1990	1991	1992	1993	1994	95–03	2004
Chris Evert	**3**	**3**	**1**	**1**	**1**	**1**	**2**	**2**	**1**	**1**	**2**	**2**	**2**	**2**	**2**	**3**	**3**	10 (Note: Evert retired in September 1989 after the US Open, at which time she was ranked world No. 4.)							
Martina Navratilova			9	**3**	4	**3**	**1**	**1**	**3**	**3**	**1**	**1**	**1**	**1**	**1**	**2**	**2**	**2**	**3**	4	5	**3**	8		376

== See also ==
- List of tennis rivalries
- Grand Slam (tennis)
- Chris Evert career statistics
- Martina Navratilova career statistics
- Unmatched
