= 1988 Virginia Slims of Dallas – Singles =

Singles
- 1988 Virginia Slims of Dallas
- 1987 Champion: (United States) Chris Evert-Lloyd

Final
- Champion: (United States) Martina Navratilova
- Runner-up: (United States) Pam Shriver
- Score: 6–0, 6–3

Details
- Draw: 16
- Seeds: 8

Events
Singles	Doubles
← 1987 ·	Virginia Slims of Dallas	· 1989 →

Chris Evert was the defending champion but did not compete that year.

Martina Navratilova won in the final 6–0, 6–3 against Pam Shriver.

== Seeds ==
A champion seed is indicated in bold text while text in italics indicates the round in which that seed was eliminated.

1. (United States) **Martina Navratilova (champion)**
2. (United States) Pam Shriver (final)
3. (Bulgaria) Manuela Maleeva (semifinals)
4. (United States) Zina Garrison (semifinals)
5. (United States) Lori McNeil (first round)
6. (United States) Barbara Potter (quarterfinals)
7. (Bulgaria) Katerina Maleeva (quarterfinals)
8. (Soviet Union) Natasha Zvereva (quarterfinals)

== Draw ==
=== Key ===
- Q = Qualifier
- WC = Wild card
- LL = Lucky loser
- Alt = Alternate
- SE = Special exempt
- PR = Protected ranking
- ITF = ITF entry
- JE = Junior exempt
- w/o = Walkover
- r = Retired
- d = Defaulted
- SR = Special ranking

First round
1	(United States) **M Navratilova**	**6**	**6**
(United States) C Benjamin	0	1
(United States) E Burgin	2	2
(Soviet Union) **L Savchenko**	**6**	**6**
(Switzerland) C Jolissaint	3	4
(United States) **S Rehe**	**6**	**6**
(United States) K Keil	2	2
6	(United States) **B Potter**	**6**	**6**
4	(United States) **Z Garrison**	**6**	**6**
(United States) B Bowes	3	3
(United States) B Gerken	**7**	2	3
Q	(Sweden) **M Lindström**	5	**6**	**6**
(United States) **G Fernández**	**6**	3	**6**
(Soviet Union) L Meskhi	2	**6**	2
(Japan) A Kijimuta	2	4
7	(Bulgaria) **K Maleeva**	**6**	**6**
5	(United States) L McNeil	2	4
Q	(United States) **M L Daniels**	**6**	**6**
(United States) W White	4	**7**	3
(West Germany) **E Pfaff**	**6**	6	**6**
Q	(South Africa) Y Vermaak	4	0
(United States) **H Ludloff**	**6**	**6**
(United States) H Na	2	3
3	(Bulgaria) **M Maleeva**	**6**	**6**
8	(Soviet Union) **N Zvereva**	**6**	3	**6**
(United States) R White	1	**6**	2
Q	(United States) **P Harper**	**6**	**7**
(United States) J Santrock	3	6
(United States) **M Werdel**	**6**	**6**
(United States) K Horvath	4	1
LL	(United States) S Collins	0	0
2	(United States) **P Shriver**	**6**	**6**

Second round
1	(United States) **M Navratilova**	**6**	**6**
(Soviet Union) L Savchenko	4	2
(United States) S Rehe	2	2
6	(United States) **B Potter**	**6**	**6**
4	(United States) **Z Garrison**	**6**	**6**
Q	(Sweden) M Lindström	1	1
(United States) G Fernández	0	1
7	(Bulgaria) **K Maleeva**	**6**	**6**
Q	(United States) **M L Daniels**	**7**	**6**
(West Germany) E Pfaff	5	1
(United States) H Ludloff	1	1
3	(Bulgaria) **M Maleeva**	**6**	**6**
8	(Soviet Union) **N Zvereva**	**6**	**6**
Q	(United States) P Harper	4	3
(United States) M Werdel	1	2
2	(United States) **P Shriver**	**6**	**6**

Quarterfinals
1	(United States) **M Navratilova**	6	**6**	**6**
6	(United States) B Potter	**7**	2	1
4	(United States) **Z Garrison**	**6**	**6**
7	(Bulgaria) K Maleeva	2	2
Q	(United States) M L Daniels	2	1
3	(Bulgaria) **M Maleeva**	**6**	**6**
8	(Soviet Union) N Zvereva	5	1
2	(United States) **P Shriver**	**7**	**6**

Semifinals
1	(United States) **M Navratilova**	1	**6**	**6**
4	(United States) Z Garrison	**6**	3	2
3	(Bulgaria) M Maleeva	5	**6**	2
2	(United States) **P Shriver**	**7**	4	**6**

Final
1	(United States) **Martina Navratilova**	**6**	**6**
2	(United States) Pam Shriver	0	3
