= 1988 Virginia Slims of Dallas – Doubles =

Doubles
- 1988 Virginia Slims of Dallas
- 1987 Champions: (United States) Mary Lou Piatek (United States) Anne White

Final
- Champions: (United States) Lori McNeil (West Germany) Eva Pfaff
- Runners-up: (United States) Gigi Fernández (United States) Zina Garrison
- Score: 2–6, 6–4, 7–5

Details
- Draw: 16
- Seeds: 4

Events
Singles	Doubles
← 1987 ·	Virginia Slims of Dallas	· 1989 →

Mary Lou Piatek and Anne White were the defending champions but only Piatek – now married with the surname of Daniels – competed that year with Barbara Gerken.

Daniels and Gerken lost in the first round to Hu Na and Stephanie Rehe.

Lori McNeil and Eva Pfaff won in the final 2–6, 6–4, 7–5 against Gigi Fernández and Zina Garrison.

== Seeds ==
Champion seeds are indicated in bold text while text in italics indicates the round in which those seeds were eliminated.

1. (United States) Gigi Fernández / (United States) Zina Garrison (final)
2. (United States) Elise Burgin / (United States) Robin White (semifinals)
3. (United States) **Lori McNeil** / (West Germany) **Eva Pfaff (champions)**
4. (Soviet Union) Leila Meskhi / (Soviet Union) Svetlana Parkhomenko (semifinals)

== Draw ==
=== Key ===
- Q = Qualifier
- WC = Wild card
- LL = Lucky loser
- Alt = Alternate
- SE = Special exempt
- PR = Protected ranking
- ITF = ITF entry
- JE = Junior exempt
- w/o = Walkover
- r = Retired
- d = Defaulted
- SR = Special ranking

First round
1	(United States) **G Fernández** (United States) **Z Garrison**	4	**7**	**6**
(United States) J Kaplan (South Africa) E Reinach	**6**	6	3
(Soviet Union) **L Savchenko** (Soviet Union) **N Zvereva**	**6**	**6**
(United States) J Russell (United States) W White	2	3
4	(Soviet Union) **L Meskhi** (Soviet Union) **S Parkhomenko**	**6**	5	**6**
(West Germany) S Hanika (United States) M Werdel	0	**7**	2
(Bulgaria) K Maleeva (Bulgaria) M Maleeva	**6**	4	2
(United States) **B Bowes** (United States) **K Horvath**	2	**6**	**6**
(United States) A Henricksson (Switzerland) C Jolissaint	**7**	6	4
(United States) **S Collins** (Sweden) **M Lindström**	5	**7**	**6**
(United States) P Harper (United States) H Ludloff	4	2
3	(United States) **L McNeil** (West Germany) **E Pfaff**	**6**	**6**
(United States) M L Daniels (United States) B Gerken	5	4
(United States) **H Na** (United States) **S Rehe**	**7**	**6**
(United States) L Allen (South Africa) L Gregory	0	2
2	(United States) **E Burgin** (United States) **R White**	**6**	**6**

Quarterfinals
1	(United States) **G Fernández** (United States) **Z Garrison**	**6**	**6**
(Soviet Union) L Savchenko (Soviet Union) N Zvereva	3	4
4	(Soviet Union) **L Meskhi** (Soviet Union) **S Parkhomenko**	**6**	5	**6**
(United States) B Bowes (United States) K Horvath	0	**7**	2
(United States) S Collins (Sweden) M Lindström	**6**	6	3
3	(United States) **L McNeil** (West Germany) **E Pfaff**	3	**7**	**6**
(United States) H Na (United States) S Rehe	3	4
2	(United States) **E Burgin** (United States) **R White**	**6**	**6**

Semifinals
1	(United States) **G Fernández** (United States) **Z Garrison**	2	**7**	**7**
4	(Soviet Union) L Meskhi (Soviet Union) S Parkhomenko	**6**	6	5
3	(United States) **L McNeil** (West Germany) **E Pfaff**	**6**	6	**6**
2	(United States) E Burgin (United States) R White	3	**7**	2

Final
1	(United States) Gigi Fernández (United States) Zina Garrison	**6**	4	5
3	(United States) **Lori McNeil** (West Germany) **Eva Pfaff**	2	**6**	**7**
