= 1983 Virginia Slims of Dallas – Doubles =

Doubles
- 1983 Virginia Slims of Dallas
- 1982 Champions: (United States) Martina Navratilova (United States) Pam Shriver

Final
- Champions: (United States) Martina Navratilova (United States) Pam Shriver
- Runners-up: (United States) Rosemary Casals (Australia) Wendy Turnbull
- Score: 6–3, 6–2

Events
Singles	Doubles
← 1982 ·	Virginia Slims of Dallas	· 1984 →

Martina Navratilova and Pam Shriver were the defending champions and won in the final 6–3, 6–2 against Rosemary Casals and Wendy Turnbull.

== Seeds ==
Champion seeds are indicated in bold text while text in italics indicates the round in which those seeds were eliminated.

1. (United States) **Martina Navratilova** / (United States) **Pam Shriver (champions)**
2. (United States) Kathy Jordan / (United States) Anne Smith (semifinals)
3. (West Germany) Claudia Kohde-Kilsch / (West Germany) Eva Pfaff (quarterfinals)
4. (United States) Rosemary Casals / (Australia) Wendy Turnbull (final)

== Draw ==
=== Key ===
- Q = Qualifier
- WC = Wild card
- LL = Lucky loser
- Alt = Alternate
- SE = Special exempt
- PR = Protected ranking
- ITF = ITF entry
- JE = Junior exempt
- w/o = Walkover
- r = Retired
- d = Defaulted
- SR = Special ranking

First round
1	(United States) **M Navratilova** (United States) **P Shriver**	**6**	**6**
(United States) S Acker (United States) L Forood	2	2
(Australia) **D Fromholtz** (Netherlands) **B Stöve**	**6**	**6**
(West Germany) B Bunge (United States) A Leand	4	2
3	(West Germany) **C Kohde-Kilsch** (West Germany) **E Pfaff**	**6**	**6**
(Czechoslovakia) H Mandlíková (Romania) V Ruzici	4	4
(South Africa) R Fairbank (United States) A Moulton	**6**	4	4
(United States) **L Allen** (United States) **S Walsh**	3	**6**	**6**
(United States) **S Collins** (Socialist Federal Republic of Yugoslavia) **M Jaušovec**	**6**	**6**
(United States) K Horvath (South Africa) Y Vermaak	2	1
(United States) P Casale (Italy) S Simmonds	4	2
4	(United States) **R Casals** (Australia) **W Turnbull**	**6**	**6**
(United Kingdom) **S Barker** (United States) **W White**	**6**	5	**6**
(Hong Kong) P Hy (United States) M L Piatek	2	**7**	2
(United Kingdom) J Durie (United States) A Kiyomura	3	**6**	1
2	(United States) **K Jordan** (United States) **A Smith**	**6**	2	**6**

Quarterfinals
1	(United States) **M Navratilova** (United States) **P Shriver**	**6**	**6**
(Australia) D Fromholtz (Netherlands) B Stöve	1	1
3	(West Germany) C Kohde-Kilsch (West Germany) E Pfaff	**6**	5	4
(United States) **L Allen** (United States) **S Walsh**	2	**7**	**6**
(United States) S Collins (Socialist Federal Republic of Yugoslavia) M Jaušovec	4	1
4	(United States) **R Casals** (Australia) **W Turnbull**	**6**	**6**
(United Kingdom) S Barker (United States) W White	6	2
2	(United States) **K Jordan** (United States) **A Smith**	**7**	**6**

Semifinals
1	(United States) **M Navratilova** (United States) **P Shriver**	**6**	**6**
(United States) L Allen (United States) S Walsh	2	2
4	(United States) **R Casals** (Australia) **W Turnbull**	**6**	**6**
2	(United States) K Jordan (United States) A Smith	1	3

Final
1	(United States) **Martina Navratilova** (United States) **Pam Shriver**	**6**	**6**
4	(United States) Rosemary Casals (Australia) Wendy Turnbull	3	2
