= 1977 Virginia Slims of Dallas =

- Date: March 7–13
- Edition: 5th
- Category: Virginia Slims circuit
- Draw: 32S / 16D
- Prize money: $100,000
- Surface: Carpet (Sporteze) / indoor
- Location: Dallas, Texas, U.S.
- Venue: Moody Coliseum

Champions

Singles
- (United Kingdom) Sue Barker

Doubles
- (United States) Martina Navratilova / (Netherlands) Betty Stöve
← 1976 ·	Virginia Slims of Dallas	· 1978 →

The 1977 Virginia Slims of Dallas was a women's tennis tournament played on indoor carpet courts at the Moody Coliseum in Dallas, Texas that was part of the 1977 Virginia Slims World Championship Series. It was the fifth edition of the tournament, held from March 7 through March 13, 1977. Second-seeded Sue Barker won the singles title and earned $20,000 first-prize money.

== Finals ==
=== Singles ===
(United Kingdom) Sue Barker defeated (United States) Terry Holladay 6–1, 7–6^{(5–4)}

=== Doubles ===
(United States) Martina Navratilova / (Netherlands) Betty Stöve defeated (Australia) Kerry Reid / (South Africa) Greer Stevens 6–2, 6–4

== Prize money ==
Event	W	F	3rd	4th	QF	Round of 16	Round of 32	Prel. round
Singles	$20,000	$10,000	$5,800	$5,000	$2,500	$1,375	$775	$400
