= 1986 Virginia Slims of Dallas =

- Date: March 10–16
- Edition: 17th
- Category: Category 4
- Draw: 56S / 28D
- Prize money: $250,000
- Surface: Carpet / indoor
- Location: Dallas, Texas, U.S.
- Venue: Moody Coliseum

Champions

Singles
- (United States) Martina Navratilova

Doubles
- (West Germany) Claudia Kohde-Kilsch (Czechoslovakia) Helena Suková
← 1985 ·	Virginia Slims of Dallas	· 1987 →

The 1986 Virginia Slims of Dallas was a women's tennis tournament played on indoor carpet courts at the Moody Coliseum in Dallas, Texas in the United States and was part of the Category 4 tier of the 1985 Virginia Slims World Championship Series. It was the 17th edition of the tournament and ran from March 10 through March 16, 1986. First-seeded Martina Navratilova won the singles title.

== Finals ==
=== Singles ===
(United States) Martina Navratilova defeated (United States) Chris Evert-Lloyd 6–2, 6–1

- It was Navratilova's 4th singles title of the year and the 115th of her career.

=== Doubles ===
(West Germany) Claudia Kohde-Kilsch / (Czechoslovakia) Helena Suková defeated (Czechoslovakia) Hana Mandlíková / (Australia) Wendy Turnbull 4–6, 7–5, 6–4

== See also ==
- Evert–Navratilova rivalry
