= 1983 Lipton WTA Championships – Doubles =

Doubles
- 1983 Lipton WTA Championships

Final
- Champions: (South Africa) Rosalyn Fairbank (United States) Candy Reynolds
- Runners-up: (Czechoslovakia) Hana Mandlíková (Romania) Virginia Ruzici
- Score: 6–4, 6–2

Details
- Draw: 32
- Seeds: 8

Events
Singles	Doubles
← 1982 ·	Amelia Island Championships	· 1984 →

Leslie Allen and Mima Jaušovec were the defending champions but they competed with different partners that year, Allen with Chris Evert-Lloyd and Jaušovec with Betsy Nagelsen.

Jaušovec and Nagelsen lost in the quarterfinals to Hana Mandlíková and Virginia Ruzici.

Allen and Evert-Lloyd lost in the semifinals to Mandlíková and Ruzici.

Rosalyn Fairbank and Candy Reynolds won in the final 6–4, 6–2 against Mandlíková and Ruzici.

== Seeds ==
Champion seeds are indicated in bold text while text in italics indicates the round in which those seeds were eliminated.

1. (West Germany) Claudia Kohde-Kilsch / (West Germany) Eva Pfaff (first round)
2. (United States) Rosemary Casals / (United States) Paula Smith (semifinals)
3. (United States) Kathleen Horvath / (South Africa) Yvonne Vermaak (quarterfinals)
4. (United States) Alycia Moulton / (United States) Barbara Potter (first round)
5. (South Africa) **Rosalyn Fairbank** / (United States) **Candy Reynolds (champions)**
6. (Brazil) Patricia Medrado / (Brazil) Cláudia Monteiro (first round)
7. (United States) Leslie Allen / (United States) Chris Evert-Lloyd (semifinals)
8. (Socialist Federal Republic of Yugoslavia) Mima Jaušovec / (United States) Betsy Nagelsen (quarterfinals)

== Draw ==
=== Key ===
- Q = Qualifier
- WC = Wild card
- LL = Lucky loser
- Alt = Alternate
- SE = Special exempt
- PR = Protected ranking
- ITF = ITF entry
- JE = Junior exempt
- w/o = Walkover
- r = Retired
- d = Defaulted
- SR = Special ranking

=== Final ===
Final
	(Czechoslovakia) Hana Mandlíková (Romania) Virginia Ruzici	4	2
5	(South Africa) **Rosalyn Fairbank** (United States) **Candy Reynolds**	**6**	**6**

=== Top half ===
First round
1	(West Germany) C Kohde-Kilsch (West Germany) E Pfaff	**6**	0	2
(United States) **A-M Fernandez** (United States) **B Norton**	2	**6**	**6**
(West Germany) B Bunge (Australia) E Goolagong Cawley	1	3
(Czechoslovakia) **H Mandlíková** (Romania) **V Ruzici**	**6**	**6**
(United States) **C Benjamin** (France) **C Vanier**	**7**	**7**
(Czechoslovakia) H Suková (Czechoslovakia) R Tomanová	6	6
(Australia) C O'Neil (Australia) P Whytcross	4	6
8	(Socialist Federal Republic of Yugoslavia) **M Jaušovec** (United States) **B Nagelsen**	**6**	**7**
4	(United States) A Moulton (United States) B Potter	4	6
(Switzerland) **P Delhees** (Netherlands) **M Mesker**	**6**	**7**
(United Kingdom) S Barker (Netherlands) B Stöve	5	3
(Canada) **C Bassett** (United States) **Z Garrison**	**7**	**6**
(United States) J Goodling (United States) V Nelson	0	**6**	0
(Australia) **B Remilton** (Australia) **A Tobin**	**6**	4	**6**
(United States) S Collins (United States) N Yeargin	2	4
7	(United States) **L Allen** (United States) **C Evert-Lloyd**	**6**	**6**

Second round
(United States) A-M Fernandez (United States) B Norton	3	5
(Czechoslovakia) **H Mandlíková** (Romania) **V Ruzici**	**6**	**7**
(United States) C Benjamin (France) C Vanier	6	0
8	(Socialist Federal Republic of Yugoslavia) **M Jaušovec** (United States) **B Nagelsen**	**7**	**6**
(Switzerland) P Delhees (Netherlands) M Mesker	3	**6**	4
(Canada) **C Bassett** (United States) **Z Garrison**	**6**	3	**6**
(Australia) B Remilton (Australia) A Tobin	4	3
7	(United States) **L Allen** (United States) **C Evert-Lloyd**	**6**	**6**

Quarterfinals
(Czechoslovakia) **H Mandlíková** (Romania) **V Ruzici**	**6**	1	**7**
8	(Socialist Federal Republic of Yugoslavia) M Jaušovec (United States) B Nagelsen	2	**6**	6
(Canada) C Bassett (United States) Z Garrison	3	3
7	(United States) **L Allen** (United States) **C Evert-Lloyd**	**6**	**6**

Semifinals
(Czechoslovakia) **H Mandlíková** (Romania) **V Ruzici**	**6**	**6**
7	(United States) L Allen (United States) C Evert-Lloyd	2	2

=== Bottom half ===
First round
5	(South Africa) **R Fairbank** (United States) **C Reynolds**	4	**6**	**6**
(United States) B Hallquist (United States) A White	**6**	3	1
(United States) **L Forood** (United States) **J Klitch**	**7**	**6**
(United States) J Davis (United States) K Latham	5	1
(United States) **A Leand** (France) **C Tanvier**	**6**	**6**
(United States) F Raschiatore (United States) K Steinmetz	2	1
(Czechoslovakia) Y Brzáková (Czechoslovakia) I Budařová	**7**	1	1
3	(United States) **K Horvath** (South Africa) **Y Vermaak**	6	**6**	**6**
6	(Brazil) P Medrado (Brazil) C Monteiro	3	1
(Argentina) **I Madruga-Osses** (Italy) **S Simmonds**	**6**	**6**
(United States) **S Mascarin** (Australia) **E Sayers**	**6**	4	**6**
(United States) B Gadusek (United States) W White	2	**6**	2
(United States) J Filkoff (Australia) A Minter	4	3
(United States) **L Bonder** (South Korea) **D-H Lee**	**6**	**6**
(Czechoslovakia) M Pazderová (Spain) C Perea-Alcalá	3	0
2	(United States) **R Casals** (United States) **P Smith**	**6**	**6**

Second round
5	(South Africa) **R Fairbank** (United States) **C Reynolds**	**6**	**6**
(United States) L Forood (United States) W White	2	3
(United States) A Leand (France) C Tanvier
3	(United States) **K Horvath** (South Africa) **Y Vermaak**	**w/o**
(Argentina) **I Madruga-Osses** (Italy) **S Simmonds**	**6**	**6**
(United States) S Mascarin (Australia) E Sayers	1	2
(United States) L Bonder (South Korea) D-H Lee	**6**	3	1
2	(United States) **R Casals** (United States) **P Smith**	4	**6**	**6**

Quarterfinals
5	(South Africa) **R Fairbank** (United States) **C Reynolds**	**6**	**6**
3	(United States) K Horvath (South Africa) Y Vermaak	4	2
(Argentina) I Madruga-Osses (Italy) S Simmonds	0	1
2	(United States) **R Casals** (United States) **P Smith**	**6**	**6**

Semifinals
5	(South Africa) **R Fairbank** (United States) **C Reynolds**	2	**6**	**6**
2	(United States) R Casals (United States) P Smith	**6**	0	4
