= 1981 Murjani WTA Championships – Doubles =

Doubles
- 1981 Murjani WTA Championships

Final
- Champions: (United States) Kathy Jordan (United States) Paula Smith
- Runners-up: (United States) JoAnne Russell (Romania) Virginia Ruzici
- Score: 6–3, 5–7, 7–6

Details
- Draw: 28
- Seeds: 7

Events
Singles	Doubles
← 1980 ·	Amelia Island Championships	· 1982 →

Rosemary Casals and Ilana Kloss were the defending champions, but Kloss did not compete this year. Casals teamed up with Wendy Turnbull and lost in semifinals to Kathy Jordan and Paula Smith.

Kathy Jordan and Paula Smith won the title by defeating JoAnne Russell and Virginia Ruzici 6–3, 5–7, 7–6 in the final.

== Seeds ==
The first four seeds received a bye into the second round.

1. (United States) Rosemary Casals / (Australia) Wendy Turnbull (semifinals)
2. (United States) Martina Navratilova / (United States) Pam Shriver (quarterfinals)
3. (United States) Kathy Jordan / (United States) Paula Smith (champions)
4. (United States) Candy Reynolds / (United States) Anne Smith (quarterfinals)
5. (Czechoslovakia) Hana Mandlíková / (Netherlands) Betty Stöve (quarterfinals)
6. (United States) Andrea Jaeger / (Czechoslovakia) Regina Maršíková (semifinals)
7. (United States) JoAnne Russell / (Romania) Virginia Ruzici (final)

== Draw ==
=== Key ===
- Q = Qualifier
- WC = Wild card
- LL = Lucky loser
- Alt = Alternate
- SE = Special exempt
- PR = Protected ranking
- ITF = ITF entry
- JE = Junior exempt
- w/o = Walkover
- r = Retired
- d = Defaulted
- SR = Special ranking

=== Finals ===
Semifinals
1	(United States) Rosemary Casals (Australia) Wendy Turnbull	2	1
3	(United States) Kathy Jordan (United States) Paula Smith	6	6
6	(United States) Andrea Jaeger (Czechoslovakia) Regina Maršíková	6	2	5
7	(United States) JoAnne Russell (Romania) Virginia Ruzici	2	6	7

Final
3	(United States) Kathy Jordan (United States) Paula Smith	6	5	7
7	(United States) JoAnne Russell (Romania) Virginia Ruzici	3	7	6

=== Top half ===
First round
(United States) S Margolin (United States) M Louie	1	6	6
(United States) S Mascarin (United States) K Rinaldi	6	3	2
(Canada) M Blackwood (Australia) S Leo	4	1
(United States) W White (United States) ML Piatek	6	6
(United Kingdom) V Wade (United States) L Allen	6	4	6
(Socialist Federal Republic of Yugoslavia) M Jaušovec (United States) L Forood	4	6	4
(United States) J Davis (United States) B Hallquist	3	2
(United States) S Acker (United States) T Holladay	6	6
(West Germany) C Kohde-Kilsch (United States) A White	6	6	6
(United States) B Jordan (United States) L duPont	7	2	3
(Switzerland) P Delhees (Netherlands) N Schutte	4	2
5	(Czechoslovakia) H Mandlíková (Netherlands) B Stöve	6	6

Second round
1	(United States) R Casals (Australia) W Turnbull	7	6
(United States) S Margolin (United States) M Louie	5	2
(United States) W White (United States) ML Piatek	4	6	7
(United Kingdom) V Wade (United States) L Allen	6	3	6
3	(United States) K Jordan (United States) P Smith	7	1	6
(United States) S Acker (United States) T Holladay	5	6	4
(West Germany) C Kohde-Kilsch (United States) A White	6	6	6
5	(Czechoslovakia) H Mandlíková (Netherlands) B Stöve	7	4	7

Quarterfinals
1	(United States) R Casals (Australia) W Turnbull	6	7
(United States) W White (United States) ML Piatek	4	5
3	(United States) K Jordan (United States) P Smith	4	6	6
5	(Czechoslovakia) H Mandlíková (Netherlands) B Stöve	6	4	3

Semifinals
1	(United States) R Casals (Australia) W Turnbull	2	1
3	(United States) K Jordan (United States) P Smith	6	6

=== Bottom half ===
First round
6	(United States) A Jaeger (Czechoslovakia) R Maršíková	7	6
(United Kingdom) A Hobbs (South Africa) Y Vermaak	6	3
(Switzerland) H Strachoňová (United States) J DuVall	2	2
(Australia) D Fromholtz (West Germany) S Hanika	6	6
(United States) J Portman (United States) R Richards	6	6
(United States) S Collins (South Korea) D-h Lee	2	3
7	(United States) J Russell (Romania) V Ruzici	6	6
(United States) R Blount (Romania) L Romanov	4	4
(United States) N Yeargin (West Germany) R Tomanová	7	6
(United States) D Desfor (United States) A Buchanan	6	2
(Australia) N Gregory (Hungary) M Pinterová	6	4	3
(United States) K Jones (United States) E Norton	1	6	6

Second round
6	(United States) A Jaeger (Czechoslovakia) R Maršíková	6	6
(Australia) D Fromholtz (West Germany) S Hanika	4	0
(United States) J Portman (United States) R Richards	1	0
4	(United States) C Reynolds (United States) A Smith	6	6
7	(United States) J Russell (Romania) V Ruzici	7	3	7
(United States) N Yeargin (West Germany) R Tomanová	5	6	6
(United States) K Jones (United States) E Norton	2	2
2	(United States) M Navratilova (United States) P Shriver	6	6

Quarterfinals
6	(United States) A Jaeger (Czechoslovakia) R Maršíková	1	6	6
4	(United States) C Reynolds (United States) A Smith	6	1	4
7	(United States) J Russell (Romania) V Ruzici	6	3	6
2	(United States) M Navratilova (United States) P Shriver	4	6	2

Semifinals
6	(United States) A Jaeger (Czechoslovakia) R Maršíková	6	2	5
7	(United States) J Russell (Romania) V Ruzici	2	6	7
