= 1983 Lipton WTA Championships – Singles =

Singles
- 1983 Lipton WTA Championships

Final
- Champion: (United States) Chris Evert-Lloyd
- Runner-up: (Canada) Carling Bassett
- Score: 6–3, 2–6, 7–5

Details
- Draw: 56
- Seeds: 16

Events
Singles	Doubles
← 1982 ·	Amelia Island Championships	· 1984 →

Chris Evert-Lloyd was the defending champion and won in the final 6–3, 2–6, 7–5 against Carling Bassett.

== Seeds ==
A champion seed is indicated in bold text while text in italics indicates the round in which that seed was eliminated. The top eight seeds received a bye to the second round.

1. (United States) **Chris Evert-Lloyd (champion)**
2. n/a
3. (West Germany) Bettina Bunge (quarterfinals)
4. (Czechoslovakia) Hana Mandlíková (semifinals)
5. (West Germany) Sylvia Hanika (quarterfinals)
6. (Romania) Virginia Ruzici (second round)
7. (United States) Zina Garrison (third round)
8. (United States) Kathy Rinaldi (semifinals)
9. (United States) Bonnie Gadusek (third round)
10. n/a
11. (South Africa) Rosalyn Fairbank (first round)
12. (West Germany) Claudia Kohde-Kilsch (third round)
13. (Australia) Evonne Goolagong Cawley (third round)
14. (South Africa) Yvonne Vermaak (second round)
15. n/a
16. n/a

== Draw ==
=== Key ===
- Q = Qualifier
- WC = Wild card
- LL = Lucky loser
- Alt = Alternate
- SE = Special exempt
- PR = Protected ranking
- ITF = ITF entry
- JE = Junior exempt
- w/o = Walkover
- r = Retired
- d = Defaulted
- SR = Special ranking

=== Finals ===
Semifinals
1	(United States) **Chris Evert-Lloyd**	**6**	**6**
4	(Czechoslovakia) Hana Mandlíková	1	4
(Canada) **Carling Bassett**	**6**	**6**
8	(United States) Kathy Rinaldi	2	2

Final
1	(United States) **Chris Evert-Lloyd**	**6**	2	**7**
(Canada) Carling Bassett	3	**6**	5

=== Top half ===
==== Section 1 ====
First round
(United States) **M L Piatek**	**6**	4	**6**
Q	(United States) F Raschiatore	1	**6**	1
(Czechoslovakia) **I Budařová**	**6**	**7**
(France) C Vanier	4	6
Q	(Brazil) C Monteiro	3	3
9	(United States) **B Gadusek**	**6**	**6**
11	(South Africa) R Fairbank	2	1
(United States) **A Moulton**	**6**	**6**
(United States) A White	3	3
(United States) **P Casale**	**6**	**6**
(United States) **A Leand**	**6**	6	**6**
Q	(Czechoslovakia) R Tomanová	3	**7**	1

Second round
1	(United States) **C Evert-Lloyd**	**6**	**6**
(United States) M L Piatek	1	0
(Czechoslovakia) I Budařová	1	2
9	(United States) **B Gadusek**	**6**	**6**
(United States) A Moulton	**6**	2	3
(United States) **P Casale**	3	**6**	**6**
(United States) A Leand	2	**6**	5
5	(West Germany) **S Hanika**	**6**	4	**7**

Third round
1	(United States) **C Evert-Lloyd**	**7**	**6**
9	(United States) B Gadusek	6	3
(United States) P Casale	5	0
5	(West Germany) **S Hanika**	**7**	**6**

Quarterfinals
1	(United States) **C Evert-Lloyd**	**6**	**6**
5	(West Germany) S Hanika	3	2

==== Section 2 ====
First round
(United States) S Collins	4	6
(United States) **K Horvath**	**6**	**7**
(United States) **W White**	**6**	**6**
(Czechoslovakia) H Suková	4	4
Q	(United States) J Klitch	5	3
(United States) **C Benjamin**	**7**	**6**
14	(South Africa) **Y Vermaak**	**6**	**6**
(Italy) S Simmonds	0	1
(United States) B Hallquist	3	1
(United States) **M Torres**	**6**	**6**
(Argentina) **I Madruga-Osses**	**6**	**6**
LL	(United States) A-M Fernandez	1	1

Second round
4	(Czechoslovakia) **H Mandlíková**	**6**	**6**
(United States) K Horvath	4	4
(United States) **W White**	**6**	**6**
(United States) C Benjamin	4	2
14	(South Africa) Y Vermaak	**6**	5	1
(United States) **M Torres**	4	**7**	**6**
(Argentina) I Madruga-Osses	**6**	5	2
7	(United States) **Z Garrison**	4	**7**	**6**

Third round
4	(Czechoslovakia) **H Mandlíková**	**6**	**6**
(United States) W White	1	4
(United States) **M Torres**	**6**	**6**
7	(United States) Z Garrison	1	1

Quarterfinals
4	(Czechoslovakia) **H Mandlíková**	**7**	**6**
(United States) M Torres	1	1

=== Bottom half ===
==== Section 3 ====
First round
(United States) V Nelson	**6**	4	1
(Canada) **C Bassett**	4	**6**	**6**
(West Germany) **E Pfaff**	**6**	**6**
Q	(Switzerland) P Delhees	4	4
(United States) D Gilbert	**6**	1	2
LL	(South Korea) **D-H Lee**	4	**6**	**6**
LL	(United States) B Norton	6	6
(United Kingdom) **S Barker**	**7**	**7**
Q	(United States) **A Holton**	5	**6**	**7**
(United States) L Bonder	**7**	2	5
(Brazil) P Medrado	**6**	5	3
(United States) **L Allen**	1	**7**	**6**

Second round
6	(Romania) V Ruzici	3	6
(Canada) **C Bassett**	**6**	**7**
(West Germany) **E Pfaff**	**7**	**6**
LL	(South Korea) D-H Lee	5	2
(United Kingdom) **S Barker**	**6**	1	**6**
Q	(United States) A Holton	0	**6**	3
(United States) L Allen	1	1
3	(West Germany) **B Bunge**	**6**	**6**

Third round
(Canada) **C Bassett**	**6**	4	**7**
(West Germany) E Pfaff	1	**6**	5
(United Kingdom) S Barker	5	1
3	(West Germany) **B Bunge**	**7**	**6**

Quarterfinals
(Canada) **C Bassett**	**6**	2	**6**
3	(West Germany) B Bunge	1	**6**	4

==== Section 4 ====
First round
(France) **C Tanvier**	**6**	**6**
(United States) K Latham	4	0
(Socialist Federal Republic of Yugoslavia) **M Jaušovec**	**6**	**6**
(Peru) L Arraya	3	3
(Netherlands) M Mesker	3	4
12	(West Germany) **C Kohde-Kilsch**	**6**	**6**
13	(Australia) **E Goolagong Cawley**	3	**6**	**6**
Q	(Peru) P Vásquez	**6**	4	3
(Bulgaria) **M Maleeva**	**6**	**6**
(United States) B Nagelsen	3	2
Q	(Italy) **R Reggi**	5	**6**	**6**
(United States) S Mascarin	**7**	3	2

Second round
8	(United States) **K Rinaldi**	**7**	**6**
(France) C Tanvier	5	3
(Socialist Federal Republic of Yugoslavia) M Jaušovec	4	**7**	4
12	(West Germany) **C Kohde-Kilsch**	**6**	5	**6**
13	(Australia) **E Goolagong Cawley**	**6**	**6**
(Bulgaria) M Maleeva	3	3
Q	(Italy) **R Reggi**	**6**	**6**
LL	(United States) L Forood	3	2

Third round
8	(United States) **K Rinaldi**	**6**	1	**6**
12	(West Germany) C Kohde-Kilsch	2	**6**	1
13	(Australia) E Goolagong Cawley	3	3
Q	(Italy) **R Reggi**	**6**	**6**

Quarterfinals
8	(United States) **K Rinaldi**	**6**	**6**
Q	(Italy) R Reggi	1	2
