= 1974 Akron Tennis Open =

- Date: March 18 – 24
- Edition: 2nd
- Category: Virginia Slims circuit
- Draw: 16S / 8D
- Prize money: $50,000
- Surface: Carpet / indoor
- Location: Akron, USA
- Venue: University of Akron

Champions

Singles
- (United States) Billie Jean King

Doubles
- (United States) Rosemary Casals / (United States) Billie Jean King
← 1973 ·	Virginia Slims of Akron	· 1975 →

The Akron Tennis Open was a women's tennis tournament played on indoor carpet courts at the University of Akron Memorial Hall in Akron, Ohio in the United States and was part of the 1974 Virginia Slims circuit. It was the second edition of the tournament and was held from March 18 through March 24, 1974. Billie Jean King won the singles title and the accompanying $10,000 first-prize money.

== Finals ==
=== Singles ===
(United States) Billie Jean King defeated (United States) Nancy Gunter 6–3, 7–5

=== Doubles ===
(United States) Rosemary Casals / (United States) Billie Jean King defeated (United States) Julie Heldman / (Soviet Union) Olga Morozova 6–2, 6–4
