= 1982 Avon Championships of Dallas =

- Date: March 8–14
- Edition: 11th
- Category: Virginia Slims circuit
- Draw: 65S / 16D
- Prize money: $200,000
- Surface: Carpet (Sporteze) / indoor
- Location: Dallas, Texas, U.S.
- Venue: Moody Coliseum

Champions

Singles
- (United States) Martina Navratilova

Doubles
- (United States) Martina Navratilova / (United States) Pam Shriver
← 1981 ·	Virginia Slims of Dallas	· 1983 →

The 1982 Avon Championships of Dallas was a women's tennis tournament played on indoor carpet courts at the Moody Coliseum in Dallas, Texas that was part of the 1982 Virginia Slims World Championship Series. It was the 11th edition of the tournament and was held from March 8 through March 14, 1982. Top-seeded Martina Navratilova won the singles title and earned $35,000 first-prize money.

== Finals ==
=== Singles ===
(United States) Martina Navratilova defeated (Socialist Federal Republic of Yugoslavia) Mima Jaušovec 6–3, 6–2

- It was Navratilova's fifth singles title of the year and the 60th of her career.

=== Doubles ===
(United States) Martina Navratilova / (United States) Pam Shriver defeated (United States) Billie Jean King / (South Africa) Ilana Kloss 6–4, 6–4

== Prize money ==
Event	W	F	3rd	4th	QF	Round of 16	Round of 32	Round of 64	Prel. round
Singles	$35,000	$17,000	$9,100	$8,700	$4,250	$2,300	$1,200	$650	$500
