= 1980 Avon Championships of Dallas =

- Date: March 3–9
- Edition: 9th
- Category: Virginia Slims circuit
- Draw: 64S / 16D
- Prize money: $150,000
- Surface: Carpet (Sporteze) / indoor
- Location: Dallas, Texas, U.S.
- Venue: Moody Coliseum

Champions

Singles
- (United States) Martina Navratilova

Doubles
- (United States) Billie Jean King / (United States) Martina Navratilova
← 1979 ·	Virginia Slims of Dallas	· 1981 →

The 1980 Avon Championships of Dallas was a women's tennis tournament played on indoor carpet courts at the Moody Coliseum in Dallas, Texas that was part of the 1980 Virginia Slims World Championship Series. It was the ninth edition of the tournament, held from March 3 through March 9, 1980. First-seeded Martina Navratilova won the singles title and earned $30,000 first-prize money.

== Finals ==
=== Singles ===
(United States) Martina Navratilova defeated (Australia) Evonne Goolagong Cawley 6–3, 6–2

- It was Navratilova's sixth singles title of the year and the 40th of her career.

=== Doubles ===
(United States) Billie Jean King / (United States) Martina Navratilova defeated (United States) Rosie Casals / (Australia) Wendy Turnbull 4–6, 6–3, 6–3

== Prize money ==
Event	W	F	SF	QF	Round of 16	Round of 32	Round of 64
Singles	$30,000	$15,000	$7,350	$3,500	$1,750	$1,000	$700
