= 1974 Maureen Connolly Brinker International =

- Date: March 5–10
- Edition: 3rd
- Category: USLTA Women's Circuit
- Draw: 32S / 16D
- Prize money: $50,000
- Surface: Hard / indoor
- Location: Dallas, Texas, U.S.
- Venue: Brookhaven Country Club

Champions

Singles
- (United States) Chris Evert

Doubles
- (Colombia) Isabel Fernández de Soto (Czechoslovakia) Martina Navratilova
| ← 1973 · | Virginia Slims of Dallas | · 1975 → |

The 1974 Maureen Connolly Brinker International was a women's tennis tournament played on indoor hardcourts at the Brookhaven Country Club in Dallas, Texas. This event was a part of the 1974 USLTA Women's Circuit. It was the third edition of the tournament, held from March 5 through March 10, 1974. First-seeded Chris Evert won the singles title and earned $10,000 first-prize money.

== Finals ==
=== Singles ===
(United States) Chris Evert defeated (United Kingdom) Virginia Wade 7–5, 6–2

- It was Evert's third singles title of the year and the 26th of her career.

=== Doubles ===
(Colombia) Isabel Fernández de Soto / (Czechoslovakia) Martina Navratilova defeated (Australia) Karen Krantzcke / (United Kingdom) Virginia Wade 6–3, 3–6, 6–3

== Prize money ==
| Event | W | F | SF | QF | Round of 16 | Round of 32 |
| Singles | $10,000 | $5,600 | $2,800 | $1,400 | $700 | $350 |
