= 1975 Virginia Slims of Dallas =

- Date: March 17–23
- Edition: 4th
- Category: Virginia Slims circuit
- Draw: 32S / 16D
- Prize money: $75,000
- Surface: Carpet (Sporteze) / indoor
- Location: Dallas, Texas, U.S.
- Venue: Moody Coliseum

Champions

Singles
- (United Kingdom) Virginia Wade

Doubles
- (France) Françoise Dürr / (Netherlands) Betty Stöve
← 1974 ·	Virginia Slims of Dallas	· 1976 →

The 1975 Virginia Slims of Dallas, also known as the Maureen Connolly Memorial, was a women's tennis tournament played on indoor carpet courts at the Moody Coliseum in Dallas, Texas that was part of the 1975 Virginia Slims World Championship Series. It was the fourth edition of the tournament, held from March 17 through March 23, 1975. Fourth-seeded Virginia Wade won the singles title and earned $15,000 first-prize money.

== Finals ==
=== Singles ===
(United Kingdom) Virginia Wade defeated (Czechoslovakia) Martina Navratilova 2–6, 7–6^{(5–3)}, 4–3 ret.

=== Doubles ===
(France) Françoise Dürr / (Netherlands) Betty Stöve defeated (United States) Julie Anthony / (United States) Mona Schallau 7–6^{(5–4)}, 6–2

== Prize money ==
Event	W	F	SF	QF	Round of 16	Round of 32
Singles	$15,000	$8,500	$4,200	$2,100	$1,100	$550
