= 1983 Virginia Slims of Dallas – Singles =

Singles
- 1983 Virginia Slims of Dallas
- 1982 Champion: (United States) Martina Navratilova

Final
- Champion: (United States) Martina Navratilova
- Runner-up: (United States) Chris Evert-Lloyd
- Score: 6–4, 6–0

Events
Singles	Doubles
← 1982 ·	Virginia Slims of Dallas	· 1984 →

Martina Navratilova was the defending champion and won in the final 6–4, 6–0 against Chris Evert-Lloyd.

== Seeds ==
A champion seed is indicated in bold text while text in italics indicates the round in which that seed was eliminated.

1. (United States) **Martina Navratilova (champion)**
2. (United States) Chris Evert-Lloyd (final)
3. (United States) Pam Shriver (semifinals)
4. (Australia) Wendy Turnbull (quarterfinals)
5. (West Germany) Sylvia Hanika (quarterfinals)
6. (Czechoslovakia) Hana Mandlíková (quarterfinals)
7. (West Germany) Bettina Bunge (semifinals)
8. (United States) Kathy Rinaldi (first round)

== Draw ==
=== Key ===
- Q = Qualifier
- WC = Wild card
- LL = Lucky loser
- Alt = Alternate
- SE = Special exempt
- PR = Protected ranking
- ITF = ITF entry
- JE = Junior exempt
- w/o = Walkover
- r = Retired
- d = Defaulted
- SR = Special ranking

First round
1	(United States) **M Navratilova**	**6**	**6**
(United Kingdom) S Barker	1	2
(Italy) S Simmonds	6	3
(United States) **A Kiyomura**	**7**	**6**
(United States) **K Horvath**	**6**	**6**
(United States) A Hulbert	3	0
(Australia) D Fromholtz	4	4
6	(Czechoslovakia) **H Mandlíková**	**6**	**6**
4	(Australia) **W Turnbull**	**6**	**6**
(Sweden) C Jexell	3	2
(South Africa) **Y Vermaak**	**6**	**6**
(Czechoslovakia) M Skuherská	1	1
(United States) A Leand	**6**	3	5
(United States) **S Acker**	3	**6**	**7**
(South Africa) R Fairbank	0	2
7	(West Germany) **B Bunge**	**6**	**6**
8	(United States) K Rinaldi	1	1
(United Kingdom) **J Durie**	**6**	**6**
(West Germany) **C Kohde-Kilsch**	3	**6**	**6**
(United States) K Jordan	**6**	2	2
(United States) L Allen	4	6
(United States) **W White**	**6**	**7**
(United States) A Moulton	3	4
3	(United States) **P Shriver**	**6**	**6**
5	(West Germany) **S Hanika**	**6**	**6**
(Netherlands) M Mesker	3	2
(United States) A Smith	4	**6**	5
(Peru) **L Arraya**	**6**	3	**7**
(West Germany) **E Pfaff**	**6**	**6**
(Hong Kong) P Hy	2	4
(United States) M L Piatek	1	0
2	(United States) **C Evert-Lloyd**	**6**	**6**

Second round
1	(United States) **M Navratilova**	**6**	**6**
(United States) A Kiyomura	3	1
(United States) K Horvath	5	3
6	(Czechoslovakia) **H Mandlíková**	**7**	**6**
4	(Australia) **W Turnbull**	**6**	**6**
(South Africa) Y Vermaak	2	2
(United States) S Acker	1	2
7	(West Germany) **B Bunge**	**6**	**6**
(United Kingdom) **J Durie**	2	**6**	**6**
(West Germany) C Kohde-Kilsch	**6**	2	3
(United States) W White	2	2
3	(United States) **P Shriver**	**6**	**6**
5	(West Germany) **S Hanika**	**6**	**6**
(Peru) L Arraya	3	1
(West Germany) E Pfaff	**6**	3	3
2	(United States) **C Evert-Lloyd**	3	**6**	**6**

Quarterfinals
1	(United States) **M Navratilova**	**6**	**6**
6	(Czechoslovakia) H Mandlíková	3	1
4	(Australia) W Turnbull	3	4
7	(West Germany) **B Bunge**	**6**	**6**
(United Kingdom) J Durie	4	3
3	(United States) **P Shriver**	**6**	**6**
5	(West Germany) S Hanika	5	3
2	(United States) **C Evert-Lloyd**	**7**	**6**

Semifinals
1	(United States) **M Navratilova**	**6**	**6**
7	(West Germany) B Bunge	2	1
3	(United States) P Shriver	6	**7**	2
2	(United States) **C Evert-Lloyd**	**7**	6	**6**

Final
1	(United States) **Martina Navratilova**	**6**	**6**
2	(United States) Chris Evert-Lloyd	4	0
