= 1978 Virginia Slims of Dallas =

- Date: March 6–12
- Edition: 7th
- Category: Virginia Slims circuit
- Draw: 32S / 16D
- Prize money: $100,000
- Surface: Carpet (Sporteze) / indoor
- Location: Dallas, US
- Venue: Moody Coliseum

Champions

Singles
- (Australia) Evonne Goolagong Cawley

Doubles
- (United States) Martina Navratilova / (United States) Anne Smith
← 1976 ·	Virginia Slims of Dallas	· 1979 →

The 1978 Virginia Slims of Dallas was a women's tennis tournament played on indoor carpet courts at the Moody Coliseum in Dallas, Texas that was part of the 1978 Virginia Slims World Championship Series. It was the seventh edition of the tournament, held from March 6 through March 12, 1978. Second-seeded Evonne Goolagong Cawley won the singles title and earned $20,000 first-prize money.

== Finals ==
=== Singles ===
(Australia) Evonne Goolagong Cawley defeated (United States) Tracy Austin 4–6, 6–0, 6–2

=== Doubles ===
(United States) Martina Navratilova / (United States) Anne Smith defeated (Australia) Evonne Goolagong Cawley / (Netherlands) Betty Stöve 6–3, 7–6^{(5–2)}

== Prize money ==
Event	W	F	3rd	4th	QF	Round of 16	Round of 32
Singles	$20,000	$10,500	$6,300	$5,500	$2,800	$1,550	$850
