= 1981 Avon Championships of Dallas =

- Date: March 9–15
- Edition: 10th
- Category: Virginia Slims circuit
- Draw: 33S / 16D
- Prize money: $175,000
- Surface: Carpet (Sporteze) / indoor
- Location: Dallas, Texas, U.S.
- Venue: Moody Coliseum

Champions

Singles
- (United States) Martina Navratilova

Doubles
- (United States) Martina Navratilova / (United States) Pam Shriver
← 1980 ·	Virginia Slims of Dallas	· 1982 →

The 1981 Avon Championships of Dallas was a women's tennis tournament played on indoor carpet courts at the Moody Coliseum in Dallas, Texas that was part of the 1981 Virginia Slims World Championship Series. It was the 10th edition of the tournament, held from March 9 through March 15, 1981. Top-seeded Martina Navratilova won the singles title and earned $33,000 first-prize money.

== Finals ==
=== Singles ===
(United States) Martina Navratilova defeated (United States) Pam Shriver 6–2, 6–4

- It was Navratilova's fourth singles title of the year and the 49th of her career.

=== Doubles ===
(United States) Martina Navratilova / (United States) Pam Shriver defeated (United States) Kathy Jordan / (United States) Anne Smith 7–5, 6–4

== Prize money ==
Event	W	F	3rd	4th	QF	Round of 16	Round of 32	Prel. round
Singles	$33,000	$17,000	$8,400	$8,050	$3,900	$2,000	$1,350	$1,100
