= 1981 Murjani WTA Championships – Singles =

Singles
- 1981 Murjani WTA Championships

Final
- Champion: (United States) Chris Evert Lloyd
- Runner-up: (United States) Martina Navratilova
- Score: 6–0, 6–0

Details
- Draw: 56 (7 Q / 2 LL )
- Seeds: 14

Events
Singles	Doubles
← 1980 ·	Amelia Island Championships	· 1982 →

Chris Evert Lloyd defeated the defending champion Martina Navratilova in the final, 6–0, 6–0 to win the singles tennis title at the 1981 Murjani WTA Championships. Evert lost no sets and just twelve games en route to the title.

== Seeds ==
The first eight seeds received a bye into the second round.

1. (United States) Chris Evert Lloyd (champion)
2. (United States) Martina Navratilova (final)
3. (United States) Andrea Jaeger (quarterfinals)
4. (West Germany) Sylvia Hanika (quarterfinals)
5. (United States) Pam Shriver (quarterfinals)
6. (Czechoslovakia) Hana Mandlíková (third round)
7. (Romania) Virginia Ruzici (semifinals)
8. (Australia) Dianne Fromholtz (second round)
9. (United States) Kathy Jordan (second round)
10. (Socialist Federal Republic of Yugoslavia) Mima Jaušovec (semifinals)
11. (Czechoslovakia) Regina Maršíková (third round)
12. (United States) Anne Smith (first round)
13. (Argentina) Ivanna Madruga (quarterfinals)
14. (United States) JoAnne Russell (second round)

== Draw ==
=== Key ===
- Q = Qualifier
- WC = Wild card
- LL = Lucky loser
- Alt = Alternate
- SE = Special exempt
- PR = Protected ranking
- ITF = ITF entry
- JE = Junior exempt
- w/o = Walkover
- r = Retired
- d = Defaulted
- SR = Special ranking

=== Finals ===
Quarterfinals
1	(United States) Chris Evert-Lloyd	6	6
5	(United States) Pam Shriver	3	1
3	(United States) Andrea Jaeger	2	4
7	(Romania) Virginia Ruzici	6	6
13	(Argentina) Ivanna Madruga	1	3
10	(Socialist Federal Republic of Yugoslavia) Mima Jaušovec	6	6
4	(West Germany) Sylvia Hanika	6	1	1
2	(United States) Martina Navratilova	4	6	6

Semifinals
1	(United States) Chris Evert-Lloyd	6	6
7	(Romania) Virginia Ruzici	0	2
10	(Socialist Federal Republic of Yugoslavia) Mima Jaušovec	3	2
2	(United States) Martina Navratilova	6	6

Final
1	(United States) Chris Evert-Lloyd	6	6
2	(United States) Martina Navratilova	0	0

=== Top half ===
==== Section 1 ====
First round
(Switzerland) I Villiger	7	1	6
(United States) K Cummings	6	6	1
(United States) R Richards	4	6	6
(United States) J Duvall	6	0	7
(West Germany) C Kohde-Kilsch	2	6	4
11	(Czechoslovakia) R Maršíková	6	2	6
9	(United States) K Jordan	3	6	6
Q	(Switzerland) P Delhees	6	2	1
(Hungary) M Pinterová	6	6
(United States) L duPont	1	2
(Canada) M Blackwood	4	6	3
(Czechoslovakia) R Tomanová	6	3	6

Second round
1	(United States) C Evert Lloyd	6	6
(Switzerland) I Villiger	1	1
(United States) J Duvall	2	2
11	(Czechoslovakia) R Maršíková	6	6
9	(United States) K Jordan	6	1	5
(Hungary) M Pinterová	4	6	7
(Czechoslovakia) R Tomanová	2	1
5	(United States) P Shriver	6	6

Third round
1	(United States) C Evert Lloyd	6	6
11	(Czechoslovakia) R Maršíková	3	1
(Hungary) M Pinterová	4	6
5	(United States) P Shriver	6	7

Quarterfinals
1	(United States) C Evert Lloyd	6	6
5	(United States) P Shriver	3	1

==== Section 2 ====
First round
(United States) C Reynolds	5	4
(United States) K Horvath	7	6
(United States) M Louie	6	3	6
Q	(United States) T Lewis	2	6	4
(United States) P Smith	2	1
(United Kingdom) A Hobbs	6	6
14	(United States) J Russell	6	5	6
(United States) L Allen	0	7	1
(United States) S Mascarin	4	6	2
Q	(United States) B Gadusek	6	4	6
(South Africa) Y Vermaak	6	7
(United States) L Forood	4	5

Second round
3	(United States) A Jaeger	1	6	7
(United States) K Horvath	6	3	5
(United States) M Louie	1	2
(United Kingdom) A Hobbs	6	6
14	(United States) J Russell	3	1
Q	(United States) B Gadusek	6	6
(South Africa) Y Vermaak	5	4
7	(Romania) V Ruzici	7	6

Third round
3	(United States) A Jaeger	6	6
(United Kingdom) A Hobbs	0	1
Q	(United States) B Gadusek	6	0	3
7	(Romania) V Ruzici	4	6	6

Quarterfinals
3	(United States) A Jaeger	2	4
7	(Romania) V Ruzici	6	6

=== Bottom half ===
==== Section 3 ====
First round
Q	(United States) J Portman	6	6	3
(Switzerland) H Strachoňová	7	3	6
(United States) A White	7	6
(Australia) S Leo	5	1
(United States) S Margolin	4	0
13	(Argentina) I Madruga	6	6
10	(Socialist Federal Republic of Yugoslavia) M Jaušovec	6	6
(United States) E Norton	1	2
Q	(United States) K Jones	6	3	6
(United States) K Sands	3	6	3
(United States) ML Piatek	6	6
(United States) T Holladay	4	0

Second round
8	(Australia) D Fromholtz	4	6
(Switzerland) H Strachoňová	6	7
(United States) A White	5	3
13	(Argentina) I Madruga	7	6
10	(Socialist Federal Republic of Yugoslavia) M Jaušovec	6	6
Q	(United States) K Jones	3	0
(United States) ML Piatek	0	1
6	(Czechoslovakia) H Mandlíková	6	6

Third round
(Switzerland) H Strachoňová	5	4
13	(Argentina) I Madruga	7	6
10	(Socialist Federal Republic of Yugoslavia) M Jaušovec	6	6
6	(Czechoslovakia) H Mandlíková	4	2

Quarterfinals
13	(Argentina) I Madruga	1	3
10	(Socialist Federal Republic of Yugoslavia) M Jaušovec	6	6

==== Section 4 ====
First round
LL	(Romania) L Romanov	6	6
(United States) B Jordan	3	2
(United States) D Desfor	6	0	1
(United Kingdom) V Wade	2	6	6
(United States) S Acker	6	6
(Netherlands) B Stöve	3	2
12	(United States) A Smith	1	6	6
Q	(United States) K Rinaldi	6	3	7
(United States) W White	6	6
(United States) S Collins	2	0
Q	(West Germany) I Riedel-Kühn	2	5
LL	(South Korea) D-h Lee	6	7

Second round
4	(West Germany) S Hanika	6	6
LL	(Romania) L Romanov	2	2
(United Kingdom) V Wade	6	6
(United States) S Acker	4	1
Q	(United States) K Rinaldi	6	6
(United States) W White	2	3
LL	(South Korea) D-h Lee	0	1
2	(United States) M Navratilova	6	6

Third round
4	(West Germany) S Hanika	4	6	6
(United Kingdom) V Wade	6	2	1
Q	(United States) K Rinaldi	6	1
2	(United States) M Navratilova	7	6

Quarterfinals
4	(West Germany) S Hanika	6	1	1
2	(United States) M Navratilova	4	6	6
