= 1982 Avon Championships of Seattle =

Tennis tournament

- Date: January 18–25
- Edition: 6th
- Category: Virginia Slims circuit
- Draw: 33S / 16D
- Prize money: $150,000
- Surface: Carpet (Sporteze) / indoor
- Location: Seattle, Washington, U.S.
- Venue: Seattle Center Coliseum

Champions

Singles
- (United States) Martina Navratilova

Doubles
- (United States) Rosie Casals / (Australia) Wendy Turnbull
| ← 1981 · | WTA Seattle |

The 1982 Avon Championships of Seattle was a women's tennis tournament played on indoor carpet courts at the Seattle Center Coliseum in Seattle, Washington in the United States that was part of the 1982 Avon Championships Circuit. It was the sixth and last edition of the tournament and was held from January 18 through January 25, 1982. First-seeded Martina Navratilova won the singles title and earned $30,000 first-prize money.

== Finals ==
=== Singles ===
(United States) Martina Navratilova defeated (United States) Andrea Jaeger 6–2, 6–0

- It was Navratilova's 2nd singles title of the year and the 57th of her career.

=== Doubles ===
(United States) Rosie Casals / (Australia) Wendy Turnbull defeated (United States) Kathy Jordan / (United States) Anne Smith 7–5, 6–4

== Prize money ==
| Event | W | F | SF | QF | Round of 16 | Round of 32 | Prel. round |
| Singles | $30,000 | $15,000 | $7,350 | $3,600 | $1,900 | $1,100 | $700 |
