= 1988 Virginia Slims of Dallas =

- Date: February 8–14
- Edition: 18th
- Category: Category 4
- Draw: 32S / 16D
- Prize money: $250,000
- Surface: Hard / outdoor
- Location: Dallas, Texas, U.S.
- Venue: Moody Coliseum

Champions

Singles
- (United States) Martina Navratilova

Doubles
- (United States) Lori McNeil / (West Germany) Eva Pfaff
← 1987 ·	Virginia Slims of Dallas	· 1989 →

The 1988 Virginia Slims of Dallas was a women's tennis tournament played on indoor carpet courts at the Moody Coliseum in Dallas, Texas in the United States and was part of the Category 4 tier of the 1988 WTA Tour. It was the 18th edition of the tournament and ran from February 8 through February 14, 1988. First-seeded Martina Navratilova won the singles title.

== Finals ==
=== Singles ===
(United States) Martina Navratilova defeated (United States) Pam Shriver 6–0, 6–3

- It was Navratilova's 1st singles title of the year and the 130th of her career.

=== Doubles ===
(United States) Lori McNeil / (West Germany) Eva Pfaff defeated (United States) Gigi Fernández / (United States) Zina Garrison 2–6, 6–4, 7–5

- It was McNeil's 1st title of the year and the 12th of her career. It was Pfaff's 1st title of the year and the 5th of her career.
