= 1973 Maureen Connolly Brinker International =

- Date: March 5–11
- Edition: 2nd
- Category: USLTA Women's Circuit
- Draw: 32S / 16D
- Prize money: $37,210
- Surface: Hard / indoor
- Location: Dallas, Texas, U.S.
- Venue: Brookhaven Country Club

Champions

Singles
- (United Kingdom) Virginia Wade

Doubles
- (Australia) Evonne Goolagong (Australia) Janet Young
← 1972 ·	Virginia Slims of Dallas	· 1974 →

The 1973 Maureen Connolly Brinker International was a women's tennis tournament played on indoor hardcourts at the Brookhaven Country Club in Dallas, Texas that was part of the 1973 USLTA Women's Circuit. It was the second edition of the tournament, held from March 5 through March 11, 1973. Third-seeded Virginia Wade won the singles title and earned $12,000 first-prize money.

== Finals ==
=== Singles ===
(United Kingdom) Virginia Wade defeated (Australia) Evonne Goolagong 6–4, 6–1

=== Doubles ===
(Australia) Evonne Goolagong / (Australia) Janet Young defeated (France) Gail Sherriff / (United Kingdom) Virginia Wade 6–3, 6–2

== Prize money ==
Event	W	F	SF	QF	Round of 16	Round of 32
Singles	$12,000	$5,000	$2,000	$1,000	$400	$200
