= 1976 Virginia Slims of Akron =

- Date: February 3–8
- Edition: 4th
- Category: Virginia Slims circuit
- Draw: 34S / 8D
- Prize money: $75,000
- Surface: Carpet (i)
- Location: Akron, Ohio, US
- Venue: Richfield Coliseum

Champions

Singles
- (Australia) Evonne Goolagong

Doubles
- (South Africa) Brigitte Cuypers / (United States) Mona Guerrant
| ← 1975 · | Virginia Slims of Akron |

The 1976 Virginia Slims of Akron was a women's tennis tournament played on indoor carpet courts at the Richfield Coliseum in Akron, Ohio in the United States that was part of the 1976 Virginia Slims circuit. It was the fourth edition of the tournament and was held from February 3 through February 8, 1976. Third-seeded Evonne Goolagong won the singles title and earned $15,000 first-prize money.

== Finals ==
=== Singles ===
(Australia) Evonne Goolagong defeated (United Kingdom) Virginia Wade 6–2, 3–6, 6–2

- It was Goolagong's 2nd singles title of the year and the 64th of her career.

=== Doubles ===
(South Africa) Brigitte Cuypers / (United States) Mona Guerrant defeated (United Kingdom) Glynis Coles / (Romania) Florența Mihai 6–4, 7–6

== Prize money ==
| Event | W | F | SF | QF | Round of 16 | Round of 32 |
| Singles | $15,000 | $8,000 | $4,275 | $1,900 | $1,100 | $550 |
