= 1983 Lipton WTA Championships =

- Date: April 11–17
- Edition: 4th
- Draw: 56S / 32D
- Prize money: $250,000
- Surface: Clay / outdoor
- Location: Amelia Island, Florida, U.S.
- Venue: Amelia Island Plantation

Champions

Singles
- (United States) Chris Evert-Lloyd

Doubles
- (South Africa) Rosalyn Fairbank / (United States) Candy Reynolds
← 1982 ·	Amelia Island Championships	· 1984 →

The 1983 Lipton WTA Championships was a women's tennis tournament played on outdoor green clay courts at the Amelia Island Plantation on Amelia Island, Florida in the United States that was part of the 1983 Virginia Slims World Championship Series. It was the fourth edition of the tournament and was held from April 11 through April 17, 1983. First-seeded Chris Evert-Lloyd won the singles title and earned $32,000 first-prize money.

== Finals ==
=== Singles ===
(United States) Chris Evert-Lloyd defeated (Canada) Carling Bassett 6–3, 2–6, 7–5

- It was Evert-Lloyd's 2nd title of the year and the 126th of her career.

=== Doubles ===
(South Africa) Rosalyn Fairbank / (United States) Candy Reynolds defeated (Czechoslovakia) Hana Mandlíková / (Romania) Virginia Ruzici 6–4, 6–2

- It was Fairbank's 2nd title of the year and the 5th of her career. It was Reynolds' 4th title of the year and the 12th of her career.
