= 1981 Avon Championships of Seattle =

- Date: February 23 – March 1
- Edition: 5th
- Category: Virginia Slims circuit
- Draw: 33S / 16D
- Prize money: $125,000 (Note: The total prize money was originally $150,000 but was decreased to $125,000 because the Women's Tennis Association (WTA) was unable to meet its player commitment.)
- Surface: Carpet (Sporteze) / indoor
- Location: Seattle, Washington, U.S.
- Venue: Seattle Center Coliseum

Champions

Singles
- (West Germany) Sylvia Hanika

Doubles
- (United States) Rosie Casals / (Australia) Wendy Turnbull
← 1980 ·	WTA Seattle	· 1982 →

The 1981 Avon Championships of Seattle was a women's tennis tournament played on indoor carpet courts at the Seattle Center Coliseum in Seattle, Washington in the United States that was part of the 1981 Avon Championships Circuit. It was the fifth edition of the tournament and was held from February 23 through March 1, 1981. Sixth-seeded Sylvia Hanika won the singles title and earned $24,000 first-prize money.

== Finals ==
=== Singles ===
(West Germany) Sylvia Hanika defeated (United States) Barbara Potter 6–2, 6–4

- It was Hanika's 1st singles title of the year and the 2nd of her career.

=== Doubles ===
(United States) Rosie Casals / (Australia) Wendy Turnbull defeated (United Kingdom) Sue Barker / (United States) Ann Kiyomura 6–4, 6–1

== Prize money ==
Event	W	F	3rd	4th	QF	Round of 16	Round of 32	Prel. round
Singles	$24,000	$12,000	$6,500	$6,200	$3,000	$1,600	$900	$500
