= 1977 Virginia Slims of Seattle =

- Date: January, 31 – February 6
- Edition: 1st
- Category: Virginia Slims circuit
- Draw: 32S / 16D
- Prize money: $100,000
- Surface: Carpet (Sporteze) / indoor
- Location: Seattle, Washington, U.S.
- Venue: Seattle Center Arena
- Attendance: 28,950

Champions

Singles
- (United States) Chris Evert

Doubles
- (United States) Rosie Casals / (United States) Chris Evert
WTA Seattle	· 1978 →

The 1977 Virginia Slims of Seattle was a women's tennis tournament played on indoor carpet courts at the Seattle Center Arena in Seattle, Washington in the United States that was part of the 1977 Virginia Slims World Championship Series. It was the inaugural edition of the tournament and was held from January 31 through February 6, 1977. First-seeded Chris Evert won the singles title and earned $20,000 first-prize money.

== Finals ==
=== Singles ===
(United States) Chris Evert defeated (United States) Martina Navratilova 6–2, 6–4

- It was Evert's 2nd singles title of the year and the 69th of her career.

=== Doubles ===
(United States) Rosie Casals / (United States) Chris Evert defeated (France) Françoise Dürr / (United States) Martina Navratilova 6–4, 3–6, 6–3

== Prize money ==
Event	W	F	SF	QF	Round of 16	Round of 32	Prel. round
Singles	$20,000	$10,000	$5,400	$2,500	$1,375	$775	$400

== See also ==
- Evert–Navratilova rivalry
