= 1983 Virginia Slims of Dallas =

- Date: March 7–14
- Edition: 12th
- Draw: 33S / 16D
- Prize money: $150,000
- Surface: Carpet / indoor
- Location: Dallas, TX, United States
- Venue: Moody Coliseum

Champions

Singles
- (United States) Martina Navratilova

Doubles
- (United States) Martina Navratilova / (United States) Pam Shriver
| ← 1982 · | Virginia Slims of Dallas | · 1984 → |

The 1983 Virginia Slims of Dallas was a tennis tournament played on indoor carpet courts at the Moody Coliseum in Dallas, Texas in the United States that was part of the 1983 Virginia Slims World Championship Series. It was the 12th edition of the tournament and was held from March 7 through March 14, 1983. First-seeded Martina Navratilova won the singles title and earned $30,000 first-prize money.

== Finals ==
=== Singles ===
(United States) Martina Navratilova defeated (United States) Chris Evert-Lloyd 6–4, 6–0

- It was Navratilova's 4th singles title of the year and the 74th of her career.

=== Doubles ===
(United States) Martina Navratilova / (United States) Pam Shriver defeated (United States) Rosemary Casals / (Australia) Wendy Turnbull 6–3, 6–2

- It was Navratilova's 8th title of the year and the 155th of her career. It was Shriver's 4th title of the year and the 38th of her career.

== Prize money ==
| Event | W | F | SF | QF | Round of 16 | Round of 32 | Prel. round |
| Singles | $30,000 | $15,000 | $7,350 | $3,600 | $1,900 | $1,100 | $700 |

== See also ==
- Evert–Navratilova rivalry
- 1983 Dallas Open
