= 1981 Murjani WTA Championships =

- Date: April 20–26
- Edition: 2nd
- Draw: 56S / 28D
- Prize money: $250,000
- Surface: Clay / outdoor
- Location: Amelia Island, Florida, U.S
- Venue: Amelia Island Plantation

Champions

Singles
- (United States) Chris Evert-Lloyd

Doubles
- (United States) Kathy Jordan (United States) Anne Smith
← 1980 ·	Amelia Island Championships	· 1982 →

The 1981 Murjani WTA Championships was a women's tennis tournament played on outdoor clay courts at the Amelia Island Plantation on Amelia Island, Florida in the United States that was part of the 1981 WTA Tour. It was the second edition of the tournament and was held from April 20 through April 26, 1981. First-seeded Chris Evert-Lloyd won the singles title and earned $32,000 first-prize money.

== Finals ==
=== Singles ===
(United States) Chris Evert-Lloyd defeated (United States) Martina Navratilova 6–0, 6–0

- It was Evert-Lloyd's 4th singles title of the year and the 105th of her career.

=== Doubles ===
(United States) Kathy Jordan / (United States) Anne Smith defeated (United States) Joanne Russell / (Romania) Virginia Ruzici 6–3, 5–7, 7–6^{(7–2)}

- It was Jordan's 2nd doubles title of the year and the 10th of her career. It was Smith's 2nd doubles title of the year and the 16th of her career.

== See also ==
- Evert–Navratilova rivalry
