= 1979 Avon Championships of Seattle =

- Date: February 6–11
- Edition: 3rd
- Category: Virginia Slims circuit
- Draw: 32S / 16D
- Prize money: $125,000
- Surface: Carpet (Sporteze) / indoor
- Location: Seattle, Washington, U.S.
- Venue: Seattle Center Arena

Champions

Singles
- (United States) Chris Evert

Doubles
- (France) Françoise Dürr / (Netherlands) Betty Stöve
← 1978 ·	WTA Seattle	· 1980 →

The 1979 Avon Championships of Seattle was a women's tennis tournament played on indoor carpet courts at the Seattle Center Arena in Seattle, Washington in the United States that was part of the 1979 Avon Championships Circuit. It was the third edition of the tournament and was held from February 6 through February 11, 1979. First-seeded Chris Evert won the singles title and earned $24,000 first-prize money.

== Finals ==
=== Singles ===
(United States) Chris Evert defeated (United States) Renée Richards 6–1, 3–6, 6–1

- It was Evert's 1st singles title of the year and the 86th of her career.

=== Doubles ===
(France) Françoise Dürr / (Netherlands) Betty Stöve defeated (United Kingdom) Sue Barker / (United States) Ann Kiyomura 7–6^{(7–4)}, 4–6, 6–4

== Prize money ==
Event	W	F	SF	QF	Round of 16	Round of 32
Singles	$24,000	$12,000	$6,000	$3,000	$1,600	$900
