= 1972 Maureen Connolly Brinker International =

- Date: March 7–12
- Edition: 1st
- Category: WT Pro Tour
- Draw: 32S / 16D
- Prize money: $33,000
- Surface: Carpet (Sportface) / indoor
- Location: Dallas, Texas, U.S.
- Venue: T-BAR-M Racquet Club

Champions

Singles
- (United States) Nancy Gunter

Doubles
- (United States) Rosemary Casals / (United States) Billie Jean King
Virginia Slims of Dallas	· 1973 →

The 1972 Maureen Connolly Brinker International was a women's tennis tournament played on indoor carpet courts at the T-BAR-M Racquet Club in Dallas, Texas that was part of the 1972 WT Pro Tour. It was the inaugural edition of the tournament, held from March 7 through March 12, 1972. Unseeded Nancy Gunter won the singles title and earned $11,000 first-prize money.

== Finals ==
=== Singles ===
(United States) Nancy Gunter defeated (United States) Billie Jean King 7–6^{(5–2)}, 6–1

=== Doubles ===
(United States) Rosemary Casals / (United States) Billie Jean King defeated (Australia) Judy Tegart / (France) Françoise Dürr 6–3, 4–6, 7–5

== Prize money ==
Event	W	F	SF	QF	Round of 16	Round of 32
Singles	$11,000	$4,000	$2,000	$900	$475	$225
