= 1980 Avon Championships of Chicago =

- Date: January 21–27
- Edition: 9th
- Category: Virginia Slims circuit
- Draw: 32S / 16D
- Prize money: $200,000
- Surface: Carpet (Sporteze) / indoor
- Location: Chicago, USA
- Venue: International Amphitheatre

Champions

Singles
- (United States) Martina Navratilova

Doubles
- (United States) Billie Jean King (United States) Martina Navratilova
- Virginia Slims of Chicago

The 1980 Avon Championships of Chicago was a women's tennis tournament played on indoor carpet courts at the International Amphitheatre in Chicago, Illinois in the United States that was part of the 1980 Avon Championships Circuit. It was the ninth edition of the tournament and was held from January 21 through January 27, 1980. First-seeded Martina Navratilova won the singles title and earned $40,000 first-prize money.

== Finals ==
=== Singles ===
(United States) Martina Navratilova defeated (United States) Chris Evert-Lloyd 6–4, 6–4

- It was Navratilova's 3rd singles title of the year and the 37th of her career.

=== Doubles ===
(United States) Billie Jean King / (United States) Martina Navratilova defeated (West Germany) Sylvia Hanika / (United States) Kathy Jordan 6–3, 6–4

== Prize money ==
Event	W	F	SF	QF	Round of 16	Round of 32
Singles	$40,000	$20,000	$9,900	$4,500	$2,200	$1,200

== See also ==
- Evert–Navratilova rivalry
