= 1985 Virginia Slims of Dallas =

- Date: March 11–17
- Edition: 14th
- Draw: 32S / 16D
- Prize money: $150,000
- Surface: Carpet / indoor
- Location: Dallas, Texas, United States

Champions

Singles
- (United States) Martina Navratilova

Doubles
- (United States) Barbara Potter / (United States) Sharon Walsh
← 1984 ·	Virginia Slims of Dallas	· 1986 →

The 1985 Virginia Slims of Dallas, also known as the VS of Dallas, was a women's tennis tournament played on indoor carpet courts in Dallas, Texas in the United States. It was part of the 1984 Virginia Slims World Championship Series (Note: The 1984 Virginia Slims World Championship Series ran from March 1984 through March 1985.) and was played from March 11 through March 17, 1985. First-seeded Martina Navratilova won the singles title.

== Finals ==
=== Singles ===
(United States) Martina Navratilova defeated (United States) Chris Evert 6–3, 6–4

- It was Navratilova's 3rd singles title of the year and the 100th of her career.

=== Doubles ===
(United States) Barbara Potter / (United States) Sharon Walsh defeated (Netherlands) Marcella Mesker / (France) Pascale Paradis 5–7, 6–4, 7–6

== See also ==
- Evert–Navratilova rivalry
