= 1980 Avon Championships of Seattle =

- Date: January 28 – February 3
- Edition: 4th
- Category: Virginia Slims circuit
- Draw: 32S / 16D
- Prize money: $150,000
- Surface: Carpet (Sporteze) / indoor
- Location: Seattle, Washington, U.S.
- Venue: Seattle Center Arena

Champions

Singles
- (United States) Tracy Austin

Doubles
- (United States) Rosie Casals / (Australia) Wendy Turnbull
← 1979 ·	WTA Seattle	· 1981 →

The 1980 Avon Championships of Seattle was a women's tennis tournament played on indoor carpet courts at the Seattle Center Arena in Seattle, Washington in the United States that was part of the 1980 Avon Championships Circuit. It was the fourth edition of the tournament and was held from January 28 through February 3, 1980. Second-seeded Tracy Austin won the singles title and earned $30,000 first-prize money.

== Finals ==
=== Singles ===
(United States) Tracy Austin defeated (United Kingdom) Virginia Wade 6–2, 7–6^{(7–1)}

- It was Austin's 2nd title of the year and the 12th of her career.

=== Doubles ===
(United States) Rosie Casals / (Australia) Wendy Turnbull defeated (United Kingdom) Virginia Wade / (South Africa) Greer Stevens 6–4, 2–6, 7–5

== Prize money ==
Event	W	F	3rd	4th	QF	Round of 16	Round of 32
Singles	$30,000	$15,000	$7,500	$7,200	$3,500	$1,750	$1,000
