= 1984 NutraSweet WTA Championships – Singles =

Singles
- 1984 NutraSweet WTA Championships

Final
- Champion: (United States) Martina Navratilova
- Runner-up: (United States) Chris Evert-Lloyd
- Score: 6–2, 6–0

Details
- Draw: 56 (8Q)
- Seeds: 14

Events
Singles	Doubles
- Amelia Island Championships

Chris Evert-Lloyd was the 3-time defending champion, but lost in the final to Martina Navratilova. The score was 6–2, 6–0.

== Seeds ==
The first eight seeds received a bye to the second round.

1. (United States) Martina Navratilova (champion)
2. (United States) Chris Evert-Lloyd (final)
3. (Czechoslovakia) Hana Mandlíková (semifinals)
4. (United States) Kathy Jordan (third round)
5. (United Kingdom) Jo Durie (second round)
6. (United States) Zina Garrison (quarterfinals)
7. (United States) Kathleen Horvath (quarterfinals)
8. (West Germany) Sylvia Hanika (quarterfinals)
9. (Romania) Virginia Ruzici (first round)
10. (United States) Kathy Rinaldi (third round)
11. (Canada) Carling Bassett (third round)
12. (Bulgaria) Manuela Maleeva (semifinals)
13. (West Germany) Bettina Bunge (first round)
14. (United States) Pam Casale (second round)

== Draw ==
Key

- Q = Qualifier
- WC = Wild card
- LL = Lucky loser
- Alt = Alternate
- ITF = ITF entry
- PR = Protected ranking
- SR = Special ranking
- SE = Special exempt
- JE = Junior exempt
- JR = Junior Accelerator Programme entrant
- CO = College Accelerator Programme entrant
- NG = Next Gen Accelerator Program entrant
- w/o = Walkover
- r = Retired
- d = Defaulted

=== Finals ===
Quarterfinals
1	(United States) Martina Navratilova	7	6
(France) Catherine Tanvier	6	4
3	(Czechoslovakia) Hana Mandlíková	6	6
7	(United States) Kathleen Horvath	4	2
6	(United States) Zina Garrison	5	2
12	(Bulgaria) Manuela Maleeva	7	6
8	(West Germany) Sylvia Hanika	1	0
2	(United States) Chris Evert-Lloyd	6	6

Semifinals
1	(United States) Martina Navratilova	6	4	6
3	(Czechoslovakia) Hana Mandlíková	3	6	4
12	(Bulgaria) Manuela Maleeva	1	1
2	(United States) Chris Evert-Lloyd	6	6

Final
1	(United States) Martina Navratilova	6	6
2	(United States) Chris Evert-Lloyd	2	0

=== Top half ===
==== Section 1 ====
First round
(United States) LA Thompson	6	4	5
(United States) K Shaefer	3	6	7
(Switzerland) P Delhees	6	2	0
(Socialist Federal Republic of Yugoslavia) M Jaušovec	3	6	6
(France) C Suire	6	6
(Australia) E Sayers	2	2
9	(Romania) V Ruzici	6	6	6
(France) C Tanvier	7	1	7
(South Africa) Y Vermaak	2	6	6
(Sweden) C Lindqvist	6	2	7
(West Germany) C Kohde-Kilsch	6	7
(Netherlands) M Mesker	2	5

Second round
1	(United States) M Navratilova	6	6
(United States) K Shaefer	1	1
(Socialist Federal Republic of Yugoslavia) M Jaušovec	6	6
(France) C Suire	4	3
(France) C Tanvier	6	6
(Sweden) C Lindqvist	4	1
(West Germany) C Kohde-Kilsch	6	7
5	(United Kingdom) J Durie	4	6

Third round
1	(United States) M Navratilova	6	7
(Socialist Federal Republic of Yugoslavia) M Jaušovec	1	5
(France) C Tanvier	7	6
(West Germany) C Kohde-Kilsch	5	3

Quarterfinals
1	(United States) M Navratilova	7	6
(France) C Tanvier	6	4

==== Section 2 ====
First round
(Czechoslovakia) I Budařová	6	6
(Sweden) C Jexell	4	4
Q	(Socialist Federal Republic of Yugoslavia) S Goleš	4	6	6
(United States) S Collins	6	2	0
(France) P Paradis	1	3
11	(Canada) C Bassett	6	6
13	(West Germany) B Bunge	6	4	6
(United States) L Allen	4	6	7
(United Kingdom) A Hobbs	6	6
(South Africa) J Mundel	3	2
(Switzerland) C Jolissaint	4	4
(United States) S Solomon	6	6

Second round
3	(Czechoslovakia) H Mandlíková	6	6
(Czechoslovakia) I Budařová	1	3
Q	(Socialist Federal Republic of Yugoslavia) S Goleš	6	2	3
11	(Canada) C Bassett	3	6	6
(United States) L Allen	3	2
(United Kingdom) A Hobbs	6	6
(United States) S Solomon	4	1
7	(United States) K Horvath	6	6

Third round
3	(Czechoslovakia) H Mandlíková	6	6
11	(Canada) C Bassett	3	2
(United Kingdom) A Hobbs	2	2
7	(United States) K Horvath	6	6

Quarterfinals
3	(Czechoslovakia) H Mandlíková	6	6
7	(United States) K Horvath	4	2

=== Bottom half ===
==== Section 3 ====
First round
Q	(Brazil) P Medrado	6	6
(United States) L Bonder	4	2
(United States) M Torres	1	2
Q	(Peru) P Vásquez	6	6
(United States) W White	3	4
14	(United States) P Casale	6	6
12	(Bulgaria) M Maleeva	7	6
(France) S Amiach	5	1
Q	(United States) S Mascarin	0	6
(Peru) L Arraya	6	7
Q	(France) N Herreman	6	6
Q	(United States) A Holton	3	3

Second round
6	(United States) Z Garrison	7	6
Q	(Brazil) P Medrado	6	1
Q	(Peru) P Vásquez	6	6
14	(United States) P Casale	3	3
12	(Bulgaria) M Maleeva	6	6
(Peru) L Arraya	1	1
Q	(France) N Herreman	2	1
4	(United States) K Jordan	6	6

Third round
6	(United States) Z Garrison	6	7
Q	(Peru) P Vásquez	0	5
12	(Bulgaria) M Maleeva	7	6
4	(United States) K Jordan	6	4

Quarterfinals
6	(United States) Z Garrison	5	2
12	(Bulgaria) M Maleeva	7	6

==== Section 4 ====
First round
(United States) B Herr	6	7
(United States) C Benjamin	4	6
(United States) A Smith	0	0
(United States) T Phelps	6	6
(Argentina) I Madruga-Osses	6	6
(United States) K Sands	4	4
10	(United States) K Rinaldi	3	6	6
(South Africa) R Fairbank	6	2	4
(Italy) R Reggi	6	6
Q	(Australia) A Minter	4	4
(Japan) E Inoue	6	7
Q	(Austria) P Huber	3	5

Second round
8	(West Germany) S Hanika	6	4	6
(United States) B Herr	1	6	2
(United States) T Phelps	1	6	6
(Argentina) I Madruga-Osses	6	4	2
10	(United States) K Rinaldi	6	6
(Italy) R Reggi	1	1
(Japan) E Inoue	1	2
2	(United States) C Evert-Lloyd	6	6

Third round
8	(West Germany) S Hanika	4	6	6
(United States) T Phelps	6	4	3
10	(United States) K Rinaldi	5	1
2	(United States) C Evert-Lloyd	7	6

Quarterfinals
8	(West Germany) S Hanika	1	0
2	(United States) C Evert-Lloyd	6	6
