= 1984 NutraSweet WTA Championships – Doubles =

Doubles
- 1984 NutraSweet WTA Championships

Final
- Champions: (United States) Kathy Jordan (United States) Anne Smith
- Runners-up: (United Kingdom) Anne Hobbs (Socialist Federal Republic of Yugoslavia) Mima Jaušovec
- Score: 6–4, 3–6, 6–4

Details
- Draw: 32
- Seeds: 8

Events
Singles	Doubles
- Amelia Island Championships

Rosalyn Fairbank and Candy Reynolds were the defending champions, but chose to compete this year with different partners. Fairbank teamed up with Jo Durie, white Reynolds teamed up with Paula Smith. Both pairs faced each other in the quarterfinals, with the pair of Durie and Fairbank winning in three sets.

Durie and Fairbank, eventually, lost in the semifinals to Anne Hobbs and Mima Jaušovec.

Kathy Jordan and Anne Smith won the title by defeating Hobbs and Jaušovec 6–4, 3–6, 6–4 in the final.

== Seeds ==
1. (United States) Betsy Nagelsen / (United States) Martina Navratilova (semifinals)
2. (United States) Jo Durie / (South Africa) Rosalyn Fairbank (semifinals)
3. (United States) Kathy Jordan / (United States) Anne Smith (champions)
4. (United Kingdom) Anne Hobbs / (Socialist Federal Republic of Yugoslavia) Mima Jaušovec (final)
5. (Switzerland) Christiane Jolissaint / (Netherlands) Marcella Mesker (quarterfinals)
6. (United States) Candy Reynolds / (United States) Paula Smith (quarterfinals)
7. (United States) Barbara Jordan / (Australia) Elizabeth Sayers (first round)
8. (United States) Rosie Casals / (United States) Kathleen Horvath (quarterfinals)

== Draw ==
Key

- Q = Qualifier
- WC = Wild card
- LL = Lucky loser
- Alt = Alternate
- ITF = ITF entry
- PR = Protected ranking
- SR = Special ranking
- SE = Special exempt
- JE = Junior exempt
- JR = Junior Accelerator Programme entrant
- CO = College Accelerator Programme entrant
- NG = Next Gen Accelerator Program entrant
- w/o = Walkover
- r = Retired
- d = Defaulted

=== Finals ===
Semifinals
1	(United States) Betsy Nagelsen (United States) Martina Navratilova	1	3
3	(United States) Kathy Jordan (United States) Anne Smith	6	6
4	(United Kingdom) Anne Hobbs (Socialist Federal Republic of Yugoslavia) Mima Jaušovec	6	4	6
2	(United Kingdom) Jo Durie (South Africa) Rosalyn Fairbank	4	6	4

Final
3	(United States) Kathy Jordan (United States) Anne Smith	6	3	6
4	(United Kingdom) Anne Hobbs (Socialist Federal Republic of Yugoslavia) Mima Jaušovec	4	6	4

=== Top half ===
First round
1	(United States) B Nagelsen (United States) M Navratilova	6	7
(Australia) S Leo (United States) N Yeargin	2	6
(United States) J Klitch (United States) J Newberry	4	2
(Argentina) I Madruga (United States) K Rinaldi	6	6
(Czechoslovakia) I Budařová (Czechoslovakia) M Skuherská	6	2	6
(United States) C Benjamin (South Africa) Y Vermaak	1	6	7
(United States) C Evert-Lloyd (Czechoslovakia) H Mandlíková	6	6	6
7	(United States) B Jordan (Australia) E Sayers	1	7	1
3	(United States) K Jordan (United States) A Smith	6	6
(United States) Z Garrison (United States) L McNeil	3	4
(West Germany) B Bunge (United States) A Leand	3	2
(Romania) V Ruzici (France) C Tanvier	6	6
(United States) A Holton (United States) Kathy Holton	3	2
(United States) Le Allen (United States) W White	6	6
(Australia) A Minter (South Africa) J Mundel	2	1
5	(Switzerland) C Jolissaint (Netherlands) M Mesker	6	6

Second round
1	(United States) B Nagelsen (United States) M Navratilova	6	6
(Argentina) I Madruga (United States) K Rinaldi	1	4
(United States) C Benjamin (South Africa) Y Vermaak	6	7
(United States) C Evert-Lloyd (Czechoslovakia) H Mandlíková	4	5
3	(United States) K Jordan (United States) A Smith	6	6
(Romania) V Ruzici (France) C Tanvier	4	1
(United States) Le Allen (United States) W White	6	4	3
5	(Switzerland) C Jolissaint (Netherlands) M Mesker	2	6	6

Quarterfinals
1	(United States) B Nagelsen (United States) M Navratilova	6	4	6
(United States) C Benjamin (South Africa) Y Vermaak	1	6	2
3	(United States) K Jordan (United States) A Smith	6	3	6
5	(Switzerland) C Jolissaint (Netherlands) M Mesker	3	6	3

Semifinals
1	(United States) B Nagelsen (United States) M Navratilova	1	3
3	(United States) K Jordan (United States) A Smith	6	6

=== Bottom half ===
First round
8	(United States) R Casals (United States) K Horvath	6	6
(Australia) B Remilton (United States) K Steinmetz	2	4
(United States) S Collins (United States) B Herr	6	5	6
(Peru) L Arraya (Argentina) E Longo	2	7	3
(United States) T Phelps (United States) M Torres	6	4	7
(Bulgaria) M Maleeva (Netherlands) B Stöve	3	6	6
(Switzerland) P Delhees (United States) K Sands	2	6	1
4	(United Kingdom) A Hobbs (Socialist Federal Republic of Yugoslavia) M Jaušovec	6	4	6
6	(United States) C Reynolds (United States) P Smith	6	6
(Poland) I Kuczyńska (Brazil) P Medrado	4	3
(United States) P Casale (Italy) R Reggi	6	5	5
(Canada) C Bassett (United States) K Shaefer	3	7	7
(France) S Amiach (France) C Suire	6	6
(West Germany) C Kohde-Kilsch (France) P Paradis	4	4
(United States) S Mascarin (United States) F Raschiatore	1	1
2	(United Kingdom) J Durie (South Africa) R Fairbank	6	6

Second round
8	(United States) R Casals (United States) K Horvath	5	6	7
(United States) S Collins (United States) B Herr	7	1	6
(United States) T Phelps (United States) M Torres	3	4
4	(United Kingdom) A Hobbs (Socialist Federal Republic of Yugoslavia) M Jaušovec	6	6
6	(United States) C Reynolds (United States) P Smith	6	6
(Canada) C Bassett (United States) K Shaefer	3	4
(France) S Amiach (France) C Suire	3	1
2	(United Kingdom) J Durie (South Africa) R Fairbank	6	6

Quarterfinals
8	(United States) R Casals (United States) K Horvath	4	6
4	(United Kingdom) A Hobbs (Socialist Federal Republic of Yugoslavia) M Jaušovec	6	7
6	(United States) C Reynolds (United States) P Smith	6	0	4
2	(United Kingdom) J Durie (South Africa) R Fairbank	4	6	6

Semifinals
4	(United Kingdom) A Hobbs (Socialist Federal Republic of Yugoslavia) M Jaušovec	6	4	6
2	(United Kingdom) J Durie (South Africa) R Fairbank	4	6	4
