= Unmatched =

- Genre: Sports documentary
- Directed by: Lisa Lax, Nancy Stern
- Starring: Martina Navratilova, Chris Evert
- Original language: English

Production
- Producer: Hannah Storm
- Running time: 54 minutes

Unmatched is a documentary about tennis players Martina Navratilova and Chris Evert, their decades-long on-court rivalry and lifelong friendship, created for ESPN's 30 for 30 documentary series. Evert and Navratilova met in 80 matches, 60 finals and 14 grand slam finals with Navratilova sporting a 43–37 advantage.

== Synopsis ==
The film is a series of personal conversations, where Evert and Navratilova talk about the experiences playing each other while remaining friends off the court. Hannah Storm interviews from off-screen, her questions helped by the fact that she is also friends with Evert from working Wimbledon studio shows for NBC. Navratilova and Evert discuss practicing together before tournaments, and playing doubles to win Wimbledon in 1976. They also talk about their double dating with Dean Martin Jr. and Desi Arnaz Jr., and how Navratilova helped Evert meet her second husband, Andy Mill.

== Filming ==
The film was shot over three days in Amagansett, New York in October 2009.

== Reception ==
Unmatched was awarded the 2011 Gracie Award for "Outstanding Producer - News/Non-fiction".
