= 1978 Virginia Slims of Seattle =

- Date: February 6–12
- Edition: 2nd
- Category: Virginia Slims circuit
- Draw: 32S / 16D
- Prize money: $100,000
- Surface: Carpet (Sporteze) / indoor
- Location: Seattle, Washington, U.S.
- Venue: Seattle Center Arena

Champions

Singles
- (United States) Martina Navratilova

Doubles
- (Australia) Kerry Melville Reid / (Australia) Wendy Turnbull
← 1977 ·	WTA Seattle	· 1979 →

The 1978 Virginia Slims of Seattle was a women's tennis tournament played on indoor carpet courts at the Seattle Center Arena in Seattle, Washington in the United States that was part of the 1978 Virginia Slims World Championship Series. It was the second edition of the tournament and was held from February 6 through February 12, 1978. First-seeded Martina Navratilova won the singles title and earned $20,000 first-prize money.

== Finals ==
=== Singles ===
(United States) Martina Navratilova defeated (Netherlands) Betty Stöve 6–1, 1–6, 6–1

- It was Navratilova's 1st singles title of the year and the 14th of her career.

=== Doubles ===
(Australia) Kerry Melville Reid / (Australia) Wendy Turnbull defeated (United States) Patricia Bostrom / (United States) Marita Redondo 6–2, 6–3

== Prize money ==
Event	W	F	3rd	4th	QF	Round of 16	Round of 32
Singles	$20,000	$10,500	$6,300	$5,500	$2,800	$1,550	$850
