= 1973 Akron Tennis Open =

- Date: March 19–25
- Edition: 1st
- Category: Grand Prix (B class); USLTA Circuit
- Draw: 16S / 8D
- Prize money: $25,000
- Surface: Carpet / indoor
- Location: Akron, Ohio, US
- Venue: University of Akron

Champions

Singles
- (United States) Chris Evert

Doubles
- (United States) Patti Hogan / (United States) Sharon Walsh
- Virginia Slims of Akron

The 1973 Akron Tennis Open was a women's tennis tournament played on indoor carpet courts at the University of Akron Memorial Hall in Akron, Ohio in the United States that was part of the 1973 Women's Grand Prix Circuit (B class) as well as the USLTA Circuit. It was the inaugural edition of the tournament and was held from March 19 through March 25, 1973. Chris Evert won the singles title and the accompanying $6,000 first-prize money.

== Start of Evert – Navratilova rivalry ==
In the first round of the tournament, Evert defeated Martina Navratilova in straight sets, 7–6^{(5–1)}, 6–3, after Navartilova had failed to serve out the first set at 6–5 and 30–0. It was their first encounter on the professional tour and the start of their legendary rivalry, which would comprise 80 matches and last until 1988.

== Finals ==
=== Singles ===
(United States) Chris Evert defeated (Soviet Union) Olga Morozova 6–3, 6–4

- It was Evert's 2nd singles title of the year and the 13th of her career.

=== Doubles ===
(United States) Patti Hogan / (United States) Sharon Walsh defeated (United States) Patricia Bostrom / (Belgium) Michèle Gurdal 7–5, 6–4
