= Virginia Slims of Akron =

Defunct tennis tournament
- Event name: Akron Indoor (1973–74); Virginia Slims of Akron (1975–76)
- Tour: WTA Tour
- Founded: 1973
- Abolished: 1976
- Editions: 4
- Location: Akron, Ohio, U.S.
- Surface: Carpet

The Virginia Slims of Akron, also known during the first two editions as the Akron Tennis Open, is a defunct WTA Tour affiliated women's tennis tournament played from 1973 to 1976. It was held in Akron, Ohio in the United States and played on indoor carpet courts.

== Past finals ==
=== Singles ===
Year	Champions	Runners-up	Score
1973	(United States) Chris Evert	(Soviet Union) Olga Morozova	6–3, 6–4
1974	(United States) Billie Jean King	(United States) Nancy Gunter	6–3, 7–5
1975	(United States) Chris Evert	(Australia) Margaret Court	6–4, 3–6, 6–3
1976	(Australia) Evonne Goolagong Cawley	(United Kingdom) Virginia Wade	6–2, 3–6, 6–2

=== Doubles ===
Year	Champions	Runners-up	Score
1973	(United States) Patti Hogan (United States) Sharon Walsh	(United States) Patricia Bostrom (Belgium) Michele Gurdal	7–5, 6–4
1974	(United States) Rosemary Casals (United States) Billie Jean King	(United States) Julie Heldman (Soviet Union) Olga Morozova	6–2, 6–4
1975	(France) Françoise Dürr (Netherlands) Betty Stöve	(United States) Chris Evert (Czechoslovakia) Martina Navratilova	7–5, 7–6
1976	(South Africa) Brigitte Cuypers (United States) Mona Guerrant	(United Kingdom) Glynis Coles (Romania) Florența Mihai	6–4, 7–6
