= 1989 Virginia Slims of Dallas =

- Date: September 18–24
- Edition: 19th
- Category: Category 4
- Draw: 28S / 16D
- Prize money: $250,000
- Surface: Carpet (Supreme) / indoor
- Location: Dallas, Texas, U.S.
- Venue: Moody Coliseum

Champions

Singles
- (United States) Martina Navratilova

Doubles
- (United States) Mary Joe Fernández (United States) Betsy Nagelsen
← 1988 ·	Virginia Slims of Dallas

The 1989 Virginia Slims of Dallas was a women's tennis tournament played on indoor carpet courts at the Moody Coliseum in Dallas, Texas in the United States and was part of the Category 4 tier of the 1989 WTA Tour. It was the 19th edition of the tournament and ran from September 18 through September 24, 1989. First-seeded Martina Navratilova won the singles title and earned $50,000 first-prize money.

== Finals ==
=== Singles ===
(United States) Martina Navratilova defeated (Socialist Federal Republic of Yugoslavia) Monica Seles 7–6^{(7–2)}, 6–3

- It was Navratilova's 7th singles title of the year and the 145th of her career.

=== Doubles ===
(United States) Mary Joe Fernández / (United States) Betsy Nagelsen defeated (United States) Elise Burgin / (South Africa) Rosalyn Fairbank 7–6^{(7–5)}, 6–3
