= 1976 Virginia Slims of Dallas =

- Date: March 15–21
- Edition: 5th
- Category: Virginia Slims circuit
- Draw: 32S / 16D
- Prize money: $75,000
- Surface: Carpet (Sporteze) / indoor
- Location: Dallas, U.S.
- Venue: Moody Coliseum

Champions

Singles
- (Australia) Evonne Goolagong Cawley

Doubles
- (United States) Mona Schallau / (United States) Ann Kiyomura
← 1975 ·	Virginia Slims of Dallas	· 1977 →

The 1976 Virginia Slims of Dallas was a women's tennis tournament played on indoor carpet courts at the Moody Coliseum in Dallas, Texas that was part of the 1976 Virginia Slims World Championship Series. It was the fifth edition of the tournament, held from March 15 through March 21, 1976. First-seeded Evonne Goolagong Cawley won the singles title and earned $15,000 in first-prize money.

== Finals ==
=== Singles ===
(Australia) Evonne Goolagong Cawley defeated (United States) Martina Navratilova 6–1, 6–1

=== Doubles ===
(United States) Mona Schallau / (United States) Ann Kiyomura defeated (United States) Marita Redondo / (South Africa) Greer Stevens 6–3, 4–6, 6–4

== Prize money ==
Event	W	F	3rd	4th	QF	Round of 16	Round of 32
Singles	$15,000	$8,000	$4,650	$3,900	$1,900	$1,100	$550
