= 1984 Virginia Slims of Dallas =

- Date: March 19–25, 1984
- Edition: 13th
- Draw: 32S / 16D
- Prize money: $150,000
- Surface: Carpet / indoor
- Location: Dallas, Texas, U.S.
- Venue: Moody Coliseum

Champions

Singles
- (Czechoslovakia) Hana Mandlíková

Doubles
- (United States) Leslie Allen / (United States) Anne White
← 1983 ·	Virginia Slims of Dallas	· 1985 →

The 1984 Virginia Slims of Dallas was a women's tennis tournament played on indoor carpet courts at the Moody Coliseum in Dallas, Texas in the United States that was part of the 1984 Virginia Slims World Championship Series. It was the 13th edition of the tournament and was held from March 19 through March 25, 1984. Third-seeded Hana Mandlíková won the singles title and earned $28,000 first-prize money.

== Finals ==
=== Singles ===
(Czechoslovakia) Hana Mandlíková defeated (United States) Kathy Jordan 7–6^{(7–3)}, 3–6, 6–1

- It was Mandlíková's 4th singles title of the year and the 20th of her career.

=== Doubles ===
(United States) Leslie Allen / (United States) Anne White defeated (United States) Sandy Collins / (Australia) Elizabeth Sayers 6–4, 5–7, 6–2

- It was Allen's 1st title of the year and the 5th of her career. It was White's 3rd title of the year and of her career.
