= 1980 Murjani WTA Championships =

- Date: April 15–20
- Edition: 1st
- Category: Colgate Series (AA)
- Draw: 32S / 28D
- Prize money: $100,000
- Surface: Clay / outdoor
- Location: Amelia Island, Florida, U.S
- Venue: Amelia Island Plantation

Champions

Singles
- (United States) Martina Navratilova

Doubles
- (United States) Kathy Jordan (South Africa) Ilana Kloss
Amelia Island Championships	· 1981 →

The 1980 Murjani WTA Championships was a women's tennis tournament played on outdoor clay courts at the Amelia Island Plantation on Amelia Island, Florida in the United States that was part of the 1980 WTA Tour. It was the inaugural edition of the tournament and was held from April 15 through April 20, 1980. First-seeded Martina Navratilova won the singles title and earned $20,000 first-prize money.

== Finals ==
=== Singles ===
(United States) Martina Navratilova defeated (Czechoslovakia) Hana Mandlíková 5–7, 6–3, 6–2

- It was Navratilova's 7th singles title of the year and the 41st of her career.

=== Doubles ===
(United States) Rosemary Casals / (South Africa) Ilana Kloss defeated (United States) Kathy Jordan / (United States) Pam Shriver 7–6^{(7–5)}, 7–6^{(7–3)}

- It was Casals' 4th doubles title of the year and the 112th of her career. It was Kloss' 4th doubles title of the year and the 23rd of her career.
