= 1979 Avon Championships of Dallas =

- Date: February 26 – March 4
- Edition: 8th
- Category: Virginia Slims circuit
- Draw: 64S / 32D
- Prize money: $200,000
- Surface: Carpet (Sporteze) / indoor
- Location: Dallas, Texas, U.S.
- Venue: Moody Coliseum

Champions

Singles
- (United States) Martina Navratilova

Doubles
- (United States) Martina Navratilova / (United States) Anne Smith
- Virginia Slims of Dallas

The 1979 Avon Championships of Dallas was a women's tennis tournament played on indoor carpet courts at the Moody Coliseum in Dallas, Texas that was part of the 1979 Virginia Slims World Championship Series. It was the eighth edition of the tournament, held from February 26 through March 4, 1979. Top-seeded Martina Navratilova won the singles title and earned $35,000 first-prize money.

== Finals ==
=== Singles ===
(United States) Martina Navratilova defeated (United States) Chris Evert 6–4, 6–4

- It was Navratilova's fourth singles title of the year and the 28th of her career.

=== Doubles ===
(United States) Martina Navratilova / (United States) Anne Smith defeated (United States) Rosie Casals / (United States) Chris Evert 7–6, 6–2

== Prize money ==
Event	W	F	3rd	4th	QF	Round of 16	Round of 32	Round of 64
Singles	$35,000	$17,000	$9,100	$8,700	$4,250	$2,100	$1,000	$500

== See also ==
- Evert–Navratilova rivalry
