= 1975 Virginia Slims of Akron =

- Date: February 3–9
- Edition: 3rd
- Category: Virginia Slims circuit
- Draw: 16S / 8D
- Prize money: $75,000
- Surface: Carpet (i)
- Location: Akron, Ohio, U.S.
- Venue: Richfield Coliseum

Champions

Singles
- (United States) Chris Evert

Doubles
- (France) Françoise Dürr / (Netherlands) Betty Stöve
- Virginia Slims of Akron

The 1975 Virginia Slims of Akron was a women's tennis tournament played on indoor courts at the Richfield Coliseum in Akron, Ohio in the United States that was part of the 1975 Virginia Slims circuit. It was the third edition of the tournament and was held from February 3 through February 9, 1975. Chris Evert won the singles title and the accompanying $15,000 first-prize money.

== Finals ==
=== Singles ===
(United States) Chris Evert defeated (Australia) Margaret Court 6–4, 3–6, 6–3

- It was Evert's 2nd singles title of the year and the 41st of her career.

=== Doubles ===
(France) Françoise Dürr / (Netherlands) Betty Stöve defeated (United States) Chris Evert / (Czechoslovakia) Martina Navratilova 7–5, 7–6
