= 1984 NutraSweet WTA Championships =

- Date: April 16–22
- Edition: 5th
- Draw: 56S / 32D
- Prize money: $250,000
- Surface: Clay / outdoor
- Location: Amelia Island, U.S.
- Venue: Amelia Island Plantation

Champions

Singles
- (United States) Martina Navratilova

Doubles
- (United States) Kathy Jordan (United States) Anne Smith
- Amelia Island Championships

The 1984 Lipton WTA Championships was a women's tennis tournament played on outdoor clay courts at the Amelia Island Plantation in Amelia Island in the United States that was part of the 1984 Virginia Slims World Championship Series. It was the 5th edition of the tournament and was held from April 16 through April 22, 1984. First-seeded Martina Navratilova won the singles title and earned $32,000 first-prize money. It was Navratilova's 10th straight win against Evert-Lloyd but her first on clay after seven prior defeats on that surface. The loss broke Evert-Lloyd's 84 match win streak on Florida clay courts.

== Finals ==
=== Singles ===
(United States) Martina Navratilova defeated (United States) Chris Evert-Lloyd 6–2, 6–0

- It was Navratilova's 3rd singles title of the year and the 89th of her career.

=== Doubles ===
(United States) Kathy Jordan / (United States) Anne Smith defeated (United Kingdom) Anne Hobbs / (Socialist Federal Republic of Yugoslavia) Mima Jaušovec 6–4, 3–6, 6–4

- It was Jordan's 1st title of the year and the 22nd of her career. It was Smith's 1st title of the year and the 31st of her career.

== See also ==
- Evert–Navratilova rivalry
