= 1987 Virginia Slims of Dallas =

- Date: March 16–22
- Edition: 17th
- Category: Category 4
- Draw: 32S / 16D
- Prize money: $250,000
- Surface: Carpet / indoor
- Location: Dallas, Texas, U.S.
- Venue: Moody Coliseum

Champions

Singles
- (United States) Chris Evert-Lloyd

Doubles
- (United States) Mary-Lou Piatek / (United States) Anne White
- Virginia Slims of Dallas

The 1987 Virginia Slims of Dallas was a women's tennis tournament played on indoor carpet courts at the Moody Coliseum in Dallas, Texas in the United States and was part of the Category 4 tier of the 1987 WTA Tour. It was the 17th edition of the tournament and ran from March 16 through March 22, 1987. First-seeded Chris Evert-Lloyd won the singles title.

== Finals ==
=== Singles ===
(United States) Chris Evert-Lloyd defeated (United States) Pam Shriver 6–1, 6–3

- It was Evert-Lloyd's 1st singles title of the year and the 149th of her career.

=== Doubles ===
(United States) Mary-Lou Piatek / (United States) Anne White defeated (United States) Elise Burgin / (United States) Robin White 7–5, 6–3
