= 1982 Murjani WTA Championships =

- Date: April 19–25
- Edition: 3rd
- Draw: 56S / 28D
- Prize money: $250,000
- Surface: Clay / outdoor
- Location: Amelia Island, Florida, U.S
- Venue: Amelia Island Plantation

Champions

Singles
- (United States) Chris Evert-Lloyd

Doubles
- (United States) Leslie Allen (Socialist Federal Republic of Yugoslavia) Mima Jaušovec
| ← 1981 · | Amelia Island Championships | · 1983 → |

The 1982 Murjani WTA Championships was a women's tennis tournament played on outdoor clay courts at the Amelia Island Plantation on Amelia Island, Florida in the United States that was part of the 1982 WTA Tour. It was the third edition of the tournament and was held from April 19 through April 25, 1982. First-seeded Chris Evert-Lloyd won the singles title and earned $32,000 first-prize money.

== Finals ==
=== Singles ===
(United States) Chris Evert-Lloyd defeated (United States) Andrea Jaeger 6–3, 6–1

- It was Evert's 2nd singles title of the year and the 112th of her career.

=== Doubles ===
(United States) Leslie Allen / (Socialist Federal Republic of Yugoslavia) Mima Jaušovec defeated (United States) Barbara Potter / (United States) Sharon Walsh 6–1, 7–5

- It was Allen's 2nd doubles title of the year and the 3rd of her career. It was Jaušovec' 2nd doubles title of the year and the 9th of her career.
