= WTA Seattle =

Defunct tennis tournament
- Event name: Virginia Slims of Seattle (1977–78); Avon Championships of Seattle (1979–82)
- Tour: WTA Tour
- Founded: 1977
- Abolished: 1982
- Editions: 6
- Surface: Carpet (i)

The WTA Seattle is a defunct WTA Tour affiliated tennis tournament played from 1977 to 1982. It was held in Seattle, Washington in the United States and played on indoor carpet courts from 1977 to 1982. The tournament was known as the Virginia Slims of Seattle in 1977 and 1978 and for the remainder of its existence, 1979 through 1982, was called the Avon Championships of Seattle.

== Results ==
=== Singles ===
Year	Champion	Runner-up	Score
1977	(United States) Chris Evert	(United States) Martina Navratilova	6–2, 6–4
1978	(United States) Martina Navratilova	(Netherlands) Betty Stöve	6–1, 1–6, 6–1
1979	(United States) Chris Evert	(United States) Renée Richards	6–1, 3–6, 6–3
1980	(United States) Tracy Austin	(United Kingdom) Virginia Wade	6–2, 7–6^{(7–1)}
1981	(West Germany) Sylvia Hanika	(United States) Barbara Potter	6–2, 6–4
1982	(United States) Martina Navratilova	(United States) Andrea Jaeger	6–2, 6–0

=== Doubles ===
Year	Champion	Runner-up	Score
1977	(United States) Rosie Casals (United States) Chris Evert	(France) Françoise Dürr (United States) Martina Navratilova	6–4, 3–6, 6–3
1978	(Australia) Kerry Melville Reid (Australia) Wendy Turnbull	(United States) Patricia Bostrom (United States) Marita Redondo	6–2, 6–3
1979	(France) Françoise Dürr (Netherlands) Betty Stöve	(United Kingdom) Sue Barker (United States) Ann Kiyomura	7–6^{(7–4)}, 4–6, 6–4
1980	(United States) Rosie Casals (Australia) Wendy Turnbull	(South Africa) Greer Stevens (United Kingdom) Virginia Wade	6–4, 2–6, 7–5
1981	(United States) Rosie Casals (Australia) Wendy Turnbull	(United Kingdom) Sue Barker (United States) Ann Kiyomura	6–4, 6–1
1982	(United States) Rosie Casals (Australia) Wendy Turnbull	(United States) Kathy Jordan (United States) Anne Smith	7–5, 6–4
