= Virginia Slims of Dallas =

VS of Dallas

Defunct tennis tournament
- Event name: Maureen Connolly Memorial (1970–74); VS of Dallas (1975–78, 1983–89); Avon Championships of Dallas (1979–82)
- Tour: WTA Tour
- Founded: 1970
- Abolished: 1989
- Editions: 20
- Surface: Carpet

The Virginia Slims of Dallas inaugurated as the Maureen Connolly Memorial was a defunct WTA Tour affiliated women's tennis tournament From 1979 through 1982 the event was known as the Avon Championships of Dallas. It was played from 1970 to 1989 and was held in Dallas, Texas in the United States and played on indoor carpet courts.

Martina Navratilova was the most successful player at the tournament, winning the singles competition nine times and the doubles competitions eight times, partnering Colombian Isabel Fernández de Soto, Dutchwoman Betty Stöve and American Billie Jean King once, American Anne Smith twice, and American Pam Shriver three times for her doubles successes.

== Finals ==
=== Singles ===
Year	Champions	Runners-up	Score
Maureen Connolly Memorial
1970	(Australia) Margaret Smith Court	(United States) Billie Jean Moffitt King	1–6, 6–3, 11–9
1971	(United Kingdom) Virginia Wade	?	?
Maureen Connolly Brinker International
1972	(United States) Nancy Gunter	(United States) Billie Jean King	7–6^{(5–2)}, 6–1
1973	(United Kingdom) Virginia Wade	(Australia) Evonne Goolagong	6–4, 6–1
1974	(United States) Chris Evert	(United Kingdom) Virginia Wade	7–5, 6–2
Virginia Slims of Dallas
1975	(United Kingdom) Virginia Wade	(Czechoslovakia) Martina Navratilova	2–6, 7–6^{(5–3)}, 4–3 ret.
1976	(Australia) Evonne Goolagong Cawley	(United States) Martina Navratilova	6–1, 6–1
1977	(United Kingdom) Sue Barker	(United States) Terry Holladay	6–1, 7–6
1978	(Australia) Evonne Goolagong Cawley	(United States) Tracy Austin	4–6, 6–0, 6–2
Avon Championships of Dallas
1979	(United States) Martina Navratilova	(United States) Chris Evert-Lloyd	6–4, 6–4
1980	(United States) Martina Navratilova	(Australia) Evonne Goolagong Cawley	6–3, 6–2
1981	(United States) Martina Navratilova	(United States) Pam Shriver	6–2, 6–4
1982	(United States) Martina Navratilova	(Socialist Federal Republic of Yugoslavia) Mima Jaušovec	6–3, 6–2
Virginia Slims of Dallas
1983	(United States) Martina Navratilova	(United States) Chris Evert-Lloyd	6–4, 6–0
1984	(Czechoslovakia) Hana Mandlíková	(United States) Kathy Jordan	7–6, 3–6, 6–1
1985	(United States) Martina Navratilova	(United States) Chris Evert-Lloyd	6–3, 6–4
1986	(United States) Martina Navratilova	(United States) Chris Evert-Lloyd	6–2, 6–1
1987	(United States) Chris Evert-Lloyd	(United States) Pam Shriver	6–1, 6–3
1988	(United States) Martina Navratilova	(United States) Pam Shriver	6–0, 6–3
1989	(United States) Martina Navratilova	(Socialist Federal Republic of Yugoslavia) Monica Seles	7–6, 6–3

=== Doubles ===
Year	Champions	Runners-up	Score
Maureen Connolly Memorial
1972	(United States) Rosemary Casals (United States) Billie Jean King	(Australia) Judy Tegart (France) Françoise Dürr	6–3, 4–6, 7–5
1973	(Australia) Evonne Goolagong (Australia) Janet Young	(France) Gail Sherriff (United Kingdom) Virginia Wade	6–3, 6–2
1974	(Colombia) Isabel Fernández de Soto (Czechoslovakia) Martina Navratilova	(Australia) Karen Krantzcke (United Kingdom) Virginia Wade	6–3, 3–6, 6–3
Virginia Slims of Dallas
1975	(France) Françoise Dürr (Netherlands) Betty Stöve	(United States) Julie Anthony (United States) Mona Schallau	7–6^{(5–4)}, 6–2
1976	(United States) Mona Schallau (United States) Ann Kiyomura	(United States) Marita Redondo (South Africa) Greer Stevens	6–3, 4–6, 6–4
1977	(United States) Martina Navratilova (Netherlands) Betty Stöve	(Australia) Kerry Reid (South Africa) Greer Stevens	6–2, 6–4
1978	(United States) Martina Navratilova (United States) Anne Smith	(Australia) Evonne Goolagong Cawley (Netherlands) Betty Stöve	6–3, 7–6
Avon Championships of Dallas
1979	(United States) Martina Navratilova (United States) Anne Smith	(United States) Chris Evert-Lloyd (United States) Rosemary Casals	7–6, 6–2
1980	(United States) Billie Jean King (United States) Martina Navratilova	(United States) Rosemary Casals (Australia) Wendy Turnbull	4–6, 6–3, 6–3
1981	(United States) Martina Navratilova (United States) Pam Shriver	(United States) Kathy Jordan (United States) Anne Smith	7–5, 6–4
1982	(United States) Martina Navratilova (United States) Pam Shriver	(United States) Billie Jean King (South Africa) Ilana Kloss	6–4, 6–4
Virginia Slims of Dallas
1983	(United States) Martina Navratilova (United States) Pam Shriver	(United States) Rosemary Casals (Australia) Wendy Turnbull	6–3, 6–2
1984	(United States) Leslie Allen (United States) Anne White	(United States) Sandy Collins (Australia) Elizabeth Sayers	6–4, 5–7, 6–2
1985	(United States) Barbara Potter (United States) Sharon Walsh	(Netherlands) Marcella Mesker (France) Pascale Paradis	5–7, 6–4, 7–6
1986	(West Germany) Claudia Kohde-Kilsch (Czechoslovakia) Helena Suková	(Czechoslovakia) Hana Mandlíková (Australia) Wendy Turnbull	4–6, 7–5, 6–4
1987	(United States) Mary Lou Piatek (United States) Anne White	(United States) Elise Burgin (United States) Robin White	7–5, 6–3
1988	(United States) Lori McNeil (West Germany) Eva Pfaff	(United States) Gigi Fernández (United States) Zina Garrison	2–6, 6–4, 7–5
1989	(United States) Mary Joe Fernández (United States) Betsy Nagelsen	(United States) Elise Burgin (South Africa) Rosalyn Fairbank	7–6, 6–3
