= 1986 Virginia Slims of Houston – Doubles =

Doubles
- 1986 Virginia Slims of Houston

Final
- Champions: (United States) Chris Evert Lloyd (Australia) Wendy Turnbull
- Runners-up: (United States) Elise Burgin (United States) JoAnne Russell
- Score: 6–2, 6–4

Details
- Draw: 16
- Seeds: 4

Events
Singles	Doubles
← 1985 ·	Virginia Slims of Houston	· 1987 →

Elise Burgin and Martina Navratilova were the defending champions, but Navratilova did not compete this year.

Burgin teamed up with JoAnne Russell and lost in the final to Chris Evert Lloyd and Wendy Turnbull. The score was 6–2, 6–4.

== Seeds ==
1. (United States) Chris Evert Lloyd / (Australia) Wendy Turnbull (champions)
2. (United States) Mary Lou Piatek / (United States) Anne White (semifinals)
3. (United States) Elise Burgin / (United States) JoAnne Russell (final)
4. (United States) Zina Garrison / (United States) Kathy Rinaldi (semifinals)

== Draw ==
=== Key ===
- Q = Qualifier
- WC = Wild card
- LL = Lucky loser
- Alt = Alternate
- ITF = ITF entry
- PR = Protected ranking
- SR = Special ranking
- SE = Special exempt
- JE = Junior exempt
- JR = Junior Accelerator Programme entrant
- CO = College Accelerator Programme entrant
- NG = Next Gen Accelerator Program entrant
- w/o = Walkover
- r = Retired
- d = Defaulted

=== Draw ===
First round
1	(United States) C Evert Lloyd (Australia) W Turnbull	6	6
(United States) P Barg (United States) B Herr	1	3
(United States) K McDaniel (United States) W White	7	4	6
(Australia) S Leo (Australia) P Whytcross	6	6	4
4	(United States) Z Garrison (United States) K Rinaldi	6	6
(South Africa) J Mundel (United States) M Van Nostrand	3	3
(United States) C Benjamin (United States) K Sands	4	4
(United States) S Collins (United States) T Holladay	6	6
(Peru) L Gildemeister (South Africa) Y Vermaak	0	4
(United States) C Reynolds (United States) A Smith	6	6
(United States) P Casale (Czechoslovakia) R Maršíková	5	3
3	(United States) E Burgin (United States) J Russell	7	6
(United States) H Crowe (United States) K Steinmetz	6	3	0
(United States) L Antonoplis (United States) A Henricksson	4	6	6
(United States) L Allen (United States) G Rush	3	3
2	(United States) ML Piatek (United States) A White	6	6

Quarterfinals
1	(United States) C Evert Lloyd (Australia) W Turnbull	6	6
(United States) K McDaniel (United States) W White	1	1
4	(United States) Z Garrison (United States) K Rinaldi	6	6
(United States) S Collins (United States) T Holladay	3	1
(United States) C Reynolds (United States) A Smith	2	4
3	(United States) E Burgin (United States) J Russell	6	6
(United States) L Antonoplis (United States) A Henricksson	7	2	3
2	(United States) ML Piatek (United States) A White	5	6	6

Semifinals
1	(United States) C Evert Lloyd (Australia) W Turnbull	6	7
4	(United States) Z Garrison (United States) K Rinaldi	2	6
3	(United States) E Burgin (United States) J Russell	6^{2}	7	7^{7}
2	(United States) ML Piatek (United States) A White	7^{7}	5	6^{1}

Final
1	(United States) C Evert Lloyd (Australia) W Turnbull	6	6
3	(United States) E Burgin (United States) J Russell	2	4
