= 1986 Virginia Slims of Houston =

- Date: May 5–11
- Edition: 16th
- Draw: 32S / 16D
- Prize money: $150,000
- Surface: Clay / outdoor
- Location: Houston, TX, U.S.
- Venue: Westside Tennis Club

Champions

Singles
- (United States) Chris Evert-Lloyd

Doubles
- (United States) Chris Evert-Lloyd / (Australia) Wendy Turnbull
← 1985 ·	Virginia Slims of Houston	· 1987 →

The 1986 Virginia Slims of Houston was a women's tennis tournament played on outdoor clay courts at the Westside Tennis Club in Houston, Texas in the United States and was part of the 1986 WTA Tour. It was the 16th edition of the tournament and was held from May 5 through May 11, 1986. First-seeded Chris Evert-Lloyd won the singles title.

== Finals ==
=== Singles ===
(United States) Chris Evert Lloyd defeated (United States) Kathy Rinaldi 6–4, 2–6, 6–4

- It was Evert Lloyd's 5th singles title of the year and the 147th of her career.

=== Doubles ===
(United States) Chris Evert Lloyd / (Australia) Wendy Turnbull defeated (United States) Elise Burgin / (United States) JoAnne Russell 6–2, 6–4
