= 1988 Virginia Slims of Houston =

- Date: April 18–24
- Edition: 18th
- Category: Category 4
- Draw: 32S / 16D
- Prize money: $250,000
- Surface: Clay / outdoor
- Location: Houston, TX, U.S.
- Venue: Westside Tennis Club

Champions

Singles
- (United States) Chris Evert

Doubles
- (United States) Katrina Adams / (United States) Zina Garrison
← 1987 ·	Virginia Slims of Houston	· 1989 →

The 1988 Virginia Slims of Houston was a women's tennis tournament played on outdoor clay courts at the Westside Tennis Club in Houston, Texas in the United States and was part of the Category 4 tier of the 1988 WTA Tour. It was the 18th edition of the tournament and was held from April 18 through April 24, 1988. Second-seeded Chris Evert won the singles title.

== Finals ==
=== Singles ===
(United States) Chris Evert defeated (United States) Martina Navratilova 6–0, 6–4

- It was Evert's 2nd singles title of the year and the 155th of her career.

=== Doubles ===
(United States) Katrina Adams / (United States) Zina Garrison defeated (United States) Lori McNeil / (United States) Martina Navratilova 6–7^{(4–7)}, 6–2, 6–4

- It was Adams' 2nd title of the year and the 3rd of her career. It was Garrison's 3rd title of the year and the 13th of her career.

== See also ==
- Evert–Navratilova rivalry
