= 1991 Virginia Slims of Houston =

- Date: April 15–21
- Edition: 21st
- Category: Tier II
- Draw: 28S / 16D
- Prize money: $350,000
- Surface: Clay /outdoor
- Location: Houston, Texas, U.S.
- Venue: Westside Tennis Club

Champions

Singles
- (Socialist Federal Republic of Yugoslavia) Monica Seles

Doubles
- (Canada) Jill Hetherington / (United States) Kathy Rinaldi
← 1990 ·	Virginia Slims of Houston	· 1992 →

The 1991 Virginia Slims of Houston was a women's tennis tournament played on outdoor clay courts at the Westside Tennis Club in Houston, Texas in the United States that was part of Tier II of the 1991 WTA Tour. It was the 21st edition of the tournament and was held from April 15 through April 21, 1991. First-seeded Monica Seles won the singles title and earned $70,000 first-prize money.

== Finals ==
=== Singles ===
(Socialist Federal Republic of Yugoslavia) Monica Seles defeated (United States) Mary Joe Fernández 6–4, 6–3

- It was Seles' 3rd singles title of the year and the 13th of her career.

=== Doubles ===
(Canada) Jill Hetherington / (United States) Kathy Rinaldi defeated (United States) Patty Fendick / (United States) Mary Joe Fernández 6–1, 2–6, 6–1
