= 1990 Virginia Slims of Houston – Doubles =

Doubles
- 1990 Virginia Slims of Houston

Final
- Champions: None (tournament cancelled due to rain delays)

Details
- Draw: 8 (1Q)
- Seeds: 2

Events
Singles	Doubles
← 1989 ·	Virginia Slims of Houston	· 1991 →

Katrina Adams and Zina Garrison were the defending champions, but Adams did not compete this year. Garrison teamed up with Martina Navratilova.

The tournament was cancelled due to constant rain delays and no matches were completed or even started. Every pair received the equivalent amount of points (55) and prize money ($3,000) for reaching the first round.

== Seeds ==
1. (United States) Zina Garrison / (United States) Martina Navratilova
2. (Argentina) Mercedes Paz / (Soviet Union) Natasha Zvereva

== Draw ==
=== Key ===
- Q = Qualifier
- WC = Wild card
- LL = Lucky loser
- Alt = Alternate
- ITF = ITF entry
- PR = Protected ranking
- SR = Special ranking
- SE = Special exempt
- JE = Junior exempt
- JR = Junior Accelerator Programme entrant
- CO = College Accelerator Programme entrant
- NG = Next Gen Accelerator Program entrant
- w/o = Walkover
- r = Retired
- d = Defaulted

=== Draw ===
Quarterfinals
1	(United States) Zina Garrison (United States) Martina Navratilova
(South Africa) Lise Gregory (United States) Gretchen Magers
(Hungary) Andrea Temesvári (Australia) Wendy Turnbull
Q	qualifier qualifier
(Bulgaria) Katerina Maleeva (Soviet Union) Leila Meskhi
(Peru) Laura Gildemeister (Spain) Arantxa Sánchez Vicario
(United States) Mary Lou Daniels (United States) Wendy White
2	(Argentina) Mercedes Paz (Soviet Union) Natasha Zvereva

Semifinals

Final
