= 1990 Virginia Slims of Houston – Singles =

Singles
- 1990 Virginia Slims of Houston

Final
- Champion: (Bulgaria) Katerina Maleeva
- Runner-up: (Spain) Arantxa Sánchez Vicario
- Score: 6–1, 1–6, 6–4

Details
- Draw: 16 (2Q)
- Seeds: 4

Events
Singles	Doubles
← 1989 ·	Virginia Slims of Houston	· 1991 →

Monica Seles was the defending champion but she chose to compete at San Antonio during the same week, winning the title.

Katerina Maleeva won the title by defeating Arantxa Sánchez Vicario 6–1, 1–6, 6–4 in the final.

== Seeds ==
1. (United States) Martina Navratilova (semifinals)
2. (United States) Zina Garrison (semifinals)
3. (Spain) Arantxa Sánchez Vicario (final)
4. (Bulgaria) Katerina Maleeva (champion)

== Draw ==
=== Key ===
- Q = Qualifier
- WC = Wild card
- LL = Lucky loser
- Alt = Alternate
- ITF = ITF entry
- PR = Protected ranking
- SR = Special ranking
- SE = Special exempt
- JE = Junior exempt
- JR = Junior Accelerator Programme entrant
- CO = College Accelerator Programme entrant
- NG = Next Gen Accelerator Program entrant
- w/o = Walkover
- r = Retired
- d = Defaulted

=== Draw ===
First round
1	(United States) M Navratilova	6	6
Q	(Argentina) B Fulco	0	1
(Hungary) A Temesvári	6	6
(Italy) Nicoletta Iaccarino	2	1
4	(Bulgaria) K Maleeva	7^{11}	6
(Soviet Union) L Meskhi	6^{9}	1
(Peru) L Gildemeister	6	7
(West Germany) I Cueto	2	5
Q	(United States) ML Daniels	6	6
(West Germany) S Hanika	4	4
(United States) G Magers	3	3
3	(Spain) A Sánchez Vicario	6	6
(Italy) S Cecchini	3	6	6
(United States) S Sloane	6	2	3
(Soviet Union) N Zvereva	6	3	3
2	(United States) Z Garrison	4	6	6

Quarterfinals
1	(United States) M Navratilova	7	6
(Hungary) A Temesvári	5	2
4	(Bulgaria) K Maleeva	6	7^{7}
(Peru) L Gildemeister	2	6^{3}
Q	(United States) ML Daniels	5	2
3	(Spain) A Sánchez Vicario	7	6
(Italy) S Cecchini	1	3
2	(United States) Z Garrison	6	6

Semifinals
1	(United States) M Navratilova	4	6	1
4	(Bulgaria) K Maleeva	6	2	6
3	(Spain) A Sánchez Vicario	6^{4}	6	7^{9}
2	(United States) Z Garrison	7^{7}	3	6^{7}

Final
4	(Bulgaria) K Maleeva	6	1	6
3	(Spain) A Sánchez Vicario	1	6	4
