= 1986 Virginia Slims of Houston – Singles =

Singles
- 1986 Virginia Slims of Houston

Final
- Champion: (United States) Chris Evert Lloyd
- Runner-up: (United States) Kathy Rinaldi
- Score: 6–4, 2–6, 6–4

Details
- Draw: 32 (4Q/2LL)
- Seeds: 8

Events
| Singles | Doubles |
| ← 1985 · | Virginia Slims of Houston | · 1987 → |

Martina Navratilova was the defending champion, but did not compete this year.

Chris Evert Lloyd won the title by defeating Kathy Rinaldi 6–4, 2–6, 6–4 in the final.

== Seeds ==
1. (United States) Chris Evert Lloyd (champion)
2. (United States) Kathy Rinaldi (final)
3. (United States) Zina Garrison (quarterfinals)
4. (n/a)
5. (Australia) Wendy Turnbull (quarterfinals)
6. (United States) Anne White (first round)
7. (United States) Kate Gompert (quarterfinals)
8. (United States) Elise Burgin (second round)

== Draw ==
=== Key ===
- Q = Qualifier
- WC = Wild card
- LL = Lucky loser
- Alt = Alternate
- ITF = ITF entry
- PR = Protected ranking
- SR = Special ranking
- SE = Special exempt
- JE = Junior exempt
- JR = Junior Accelerator Programme entrant
- CO = College Accelerator Programme entrant
- NG = Next Gen Accelerator Program entrant
- w/o = Walkover
- r = Retired
- d = Defaulted

=== Finals ===
Semifinals
1 | (United States) Chris Evert Lloyd | 6 | 6 | 6
(Peru) Laura Gildemeister | 7 | 0 | 0
(United States) Pam Casale | 4 | 4
2 | (United States) Kathy Rinaldi | 6 | 6

Final
1 | (United States) Chris Evert Lloyd | 6 | 2 | 6
2 | (United States) Kathy Rinaldi | 4 | 6 | 4

=== Top half ===
First round
1 | (United States) C Evert Lloyd | 6 | 6
(United States) A Smith | 0 | 2
Q | (South Africa) Y Vermaak | 2 | 3
(United States) A Henricksson | 6 | 6
LL | (United States) L Antonoplis | 6 | 4 | 3
(France) C Suire | 3 | 6 | 6
(United States) C Kuhlman | 3 | 0
7 | (United States) K Gompert | 6 | 6
(United States) D Spence | 0 | 7 | 6
(United States) B Herr | 6 | 6 | 2
(Peru) L Gildemeister | 6 | 6
Q | (United States) L Allen | 4 | 4
(United States) G Kim | 3 | 2
LL | (United States) N Sodupe | 6 | 6
(United States) W White | 7 | 7
6 | (United States) A White | 5 | 5

Second round
1 | (United States) C Evert Lloyd | 6 | 6
(United States) A Henricksson | 2 | 1
(France) C Suire | 1 | 3
7 | (United States) K Gompert | 6 | 6
(United States) D Spence | 6 | 2
(Peru) L Gildemeister | 7 | 6
LL | (United States) N Sodupe | 5 | 1
(United States) W White | 7 | 6

Quarterfinals
1 | (United States) C Evert Lloyd | 6 | 6
7 | (United States) K Gompert | 4 | 1
(Peru) L Gildemeister | 6 | 6
(United States) W White | 2 | 4

Semifinals
1 | (United States) C Evert Lloyd | 6 | 6 | 6
(Peru) L Gildemeister | 7 | 0 | 0

=== Bottom half ===
First round
8 | (United States) E Burgin | 6 | 3 | 6
(United States) L McNeil | 2 | 6 | 2
(United States) G Fernández | 4 | 2
(United States) P Casale | 6 | 6
Q | (Czechoslovakia) R Maršíková | 1 | 0
(United States) M Torres | 6 | 6
(Australia) E Smylie | 5 | 0
3 | (United States) Z Garrison | 7 | 6
5 | (Australia) W Turnbull | 6 | 6
(United States) M Van Nostrand | 4 | 1
(United States) C Benjamin | 6 | 7
(United States) A Leand | 0 | 5
(United States) ML Piatek | 1 | 3
Q | (United States) K Sands | 6 | 6
(United States) C Reynolds | 1 | 5
2 | (United States) K Rinaldi | 6 | 7

Second round
8 | (United States) E Burgin | 2 | 6 | 4
(United States) P Casale | 6 | 4 | 6
(United States) M Torres | 4 | 3
3 | (United States) Z Garrison | 6 | 6
5 | (Australia) W Turnbull | 6 | 7
(United States) C Benjamin | 0 | 6
Q | (United States) K Sands | 1 | 2
2 | (United States) K Rinaldi | 6 | 6

Quarterfinals
(United States) P Casale | 7 | 6
3 | (United States) Z Garrison | 6 | 3
5 | (Australia) W Turnbull | 6 | 6 | 3
2 | (United States) K Rinaldi | 3 | 7 | 6

Semifinals
(United States) P Casale | 4 | 4
2 | (United States) K Rinaldi | 6 | 6
