= 1983 Virginia Slims of Houston – Doubles =

Doubles
- 1983 Virginia Slims of Houston
- 1982 Champions: (United States) Kathy Jordan (United States) Pam Shriver

Final
- Champions: (United States) Martina Navratilova (United States) Pam Shriver
- Runners-up: (United Kingdom) Jo Durie (United States) Barbara Potter
- Score: 6–4, 6–3

Events
Singles	Doubles
← 1982 ·	Virginia Slims of Houston	· 1984 →

Kathy Jordan and Pam Shriver were the defending champions but only Shriver competed that year with Martina Navratilova.

Navratilova and Shriver won in the final 6–4, 6–3 against Jo Durie and Barbara Potter.

== Seeds ==
Champion seeds are indicated in bold text while text in italics indicates the round in which those seeds were eliminated.

1. (United States) **Martina Navratilova** / (United States) **Pam Shriver (champions)**
2. n/a
3. (United Kingdom) Jo Durie / (United States) Barbara Potter (final)
4. (United States) Ann Kiyomura / (United States) Paula Smith (quarterfinals)

== Draw ==
=== Key ===
- Q = Qualifier
- WC = Wild card
- LL = Lucky loser
- Alt = Alternate
- SE = Special exempt
- PR = Protected ranking
- ITF = ITF entry
- JE = Junior exempt
- w/o = Walkover
- r = Retired
- d = Defaulted
- SR = Special ranking

First round
1	(United States) **M Navratilova** (United States) **P Shriver**	**6**	**6**
(United States) Z Garrison (United States) S Mascarin	1	0
(West Germany) **B Bunge** (West Germany) **E Pfaff**	6	**6**	**6**
(United States) A Leand (Italy) S Simmonds	**7**	3	3
4	(United States) **A Kiyomura** (United States) **P Smith**	**6**	**7**
(United States) S Collins (Czechoslovakia) H Suková	2	5
(Australia) D Fromholtz (Hungary) A Temesvári	4	4
(United States) **A Jaeger** (United States) **M-L Piatek**	**6**	**6**
(United States) **P Casale** (United States) **W White**	**6**	**7**
(United States) A-M Fernandez (United States) H Ludloff	1	5
(United States) J Russell (United States) A White	4	**6**	5
3	(United Kingdom) **J Durie** (United States) **B Potter**	**6**	3	**7**
(United States) **A Moulton** (United States) **C Reynolds**	**7**	**7**
(United States) L Forood (Brazil) C Monteiro	5	5
(South Africa) **Y Vermaak** (United States) **N Yeargin**	**7**	**6**
LL	(United States) J Harrington (United States) L-A Thompson	6	2

Quarterfinals
1	(United States) **M Navratilova** (United States) **P Shriver**	**6**	**7**
(West Germany) B Bunge (West Germany) S Hanika	3	6
4	(United States) A Kiyomura (United States) P Smith	2	5
(United States) **A Jaeger** (United States) **M-L Piatek**	**6**	**7**
(United States) P Casale (United States) W White	4	2
3	(United Kingdom) **J Durie** (United States) **B Potter**	**6**	**6**
(United States) A Moulton (United States) C Reynolds	**6**	5	1
(South Africa) **Y Vermaak** (United States) **N Yeargin**	2	**7**	**6**

Semifinals
1	(United States) **M Navratilova** (United States) **P Shriver**	**7**	**6**
(United States) A Jaeger (United States) M-L Piatek	6	2
3	(United Kingdom) **J Durie** (United States) **B Potter**	**6**	**6**
(South Africa) Y Vermaak (United States) N Yeargin	1	2

Final
1	(United States) **Martina Navratilova** (United States) **Pam Shriver**	**6**	**6**
3	(United Kingdom) Jo Durie (United States) Barbara Potter	4	3
