= 1983 Virginia Slims of Houston – Singles =

Singles
- 1983 Virginia Slims of Houston
- 1982 Champion: (West Germany) Bettina Bunge

Final
- Champion: (United States) Martina Navratilova
- Runner-up: (West Germany) Sylvia Hanika
- Score: 6–3, 7–6

Events
Singles	Doubles
← 1982 ·	Virginia Slims of Houston	· 1984 →

Bettina Bunge was the defending champion but lost in the quarterfinals to Martina Navratilova.

Navratilova won in the final 6–3, 7–6 against Sylvia Hanika.

== Seeds ==
A champion seed is indicated in bold text while text in italics indicates the round in which that seed was eliminated.

1. (United States) **Martina Navratilova (champion)**
2. (United States) Andrea Jaeger (first round)
3. (United States) Tracy Austin (semifinals)
4. (United States) Pam Shriver (quarterfinals)
5. (United States) Barbara Potter (first round)
6. (West Germany) Bettina Bunge (quarterfinals)
7. (West Germany) Sylvia Hanika (final)
8. (United States) Anne Smith (quarterfinals)

== Draw ==
=== Key ===
- Q = Qualifier
- WC = Wild card
- LL = Lucky loser
- Alt = Alternate
- SE = Special exempt
- PR = Protected ranking
- ITF = ITF entry
- JE = Junior exempt
- w/o = Walkover
- r = Retired
- d = Defaulted
- SR = Special ranking

First round
1	(United States) **M Navratilova**	**6**	**6**
(United States) L Bonder	0	2
(Australia) **D Fromholtz**	6	**6**	**6**
(United States) A Kiyomura	**7**	4	2
(Italy) S Simmonds	**7**	2	3
Q	(United States) **M Louie**	5	**6**	**6**
Q	(Czechoslovakia) M Pazderová	2	1
6	(West Germany) **B Bunge**	**6**	**6**
3	(United States) **T Austin**	**6**	**6**
Q	(Brazil) C Monteiro	2	0
(United States) L-A Thompson	5	6
(United States) **J Russell**	**7**	**7**
(United States) K Cummings	2	2
(United States) **A Moulton**	**6**	**6**
(United Kingdom) J Durie	**7**	3	5
8	(United States) **A Smith**	5	**6**	**7**
7	(West Germany) **S Hanika**	**6**	**6**
(United States) M-L Piatek	4	0
(United States) **W White**	5	**6**	**6**
(Hungary) A Temesvári	**7**	3	4
LL	(United States) **S Mascarin**	**6**	3	**6**
LL	(United States) C Benjamin	0	**6**	3
Q	(United States) A White	1	4
4	(United States) **P Shriver**	**6**	**6**
5	(United States) B Potter	**6**	5	2
(West Germany) **E Pfaff**	1	**7**	**6**
(Netherlands) **M Mesker**	4	**6**	**6**
(South Africa) Y Vermaak	**6**	4	2
(United States) P Casale	4	5
(United States) **A Leand**	**6**	**7**
(United States) **Z Garrison**	**6**	**6**
2	(United States) A Jaeger	1	3

Second round
1	(United States) **M Navratilova**	**7**	**6**
(Australia) D Fromholtz	6	0
Q	(United States) M Louie	2	5
6	(West Germany) **B Bunge**	**6**	**7**
3	(United States) **T Austin**	**7**	**6**
(United States) J Russell	5	0
(United States) A Moulton	1	**6**	4
8	(United States) **A Smith**	**6**	3	**6**
7	(West Germany) **S Hanika**	**6**	4	**6**
(United States) W White	2	**6**	4
LL	(United States) S Mascarin	4	1
4	(United States) **P Shriver**	**6**	**6**
(West Germany) **E Pfaff**	**6**	4	**7**
(Netherlands) M Mesker	2	**6**	6
(United States) A Leand	**6**	2	3
(United States) **Z Garrison**	4	**6**	**6**

Quarterfinals
1	(United States) **M Navratilova**	**6**	**7**
6	(West Germany) B Bunge	1	5
3	(United States) **T Austin**	**6**	**6**
8	(United States) A Smith	1	2
7	(West Germany) **S Hanika**	1	**6**	**6**
4	(United States) P Shriver	**6**	2	3
(West Germany) **E Pfaff**	4	**7**	**7**
(United States) Z Garrison	**6**	6	6

Semifinals
1	(United States) **M Navratilova**	**6**	**6**
3	(United States) T Austin	2	2
7	(West Germany) **S Hanika**	**7**	**6**
(West Germany) E Pfaff	5	1

Final
1	(United States) **Martina Navratilova**	**6**	**7**
7	(West Germany) Sylvia Hanika	3	6
