= 1992 Virginia Slims of Houston =

- Date: April 13–19
- Edition: 22nd
- Category: Tier II
- Draw: 28S / 16D
- Prize money: $350,000
- Surface: Clay /outdoor
- Location: Houston, Texas, U.S.
- Venue: Westside Tennis Club

Champions

Singles
- (Socialist Federal Republic of Yugoslavia) Monica Seles

Doubles
- (United States) Patty Fendick / (United States) Gigi Fernández
← 1991 ·	Virginia Slims of Houston	· 1993 →

The 1992 Virginia Slims of Houston was a women's tennis tournament played on outdoor clay courts at the Westside Tennis Club in Houston, Texas in the United States that was part of Tier II of the 1992 WTA Tour. It was the 22nd edition of the tournament and was held from April 13 through April 19, 1992. First-seeded Monica Seles won the singles title and earned $70,000 first-prize money.

== Finals ==
=== Singles ===
(Socialist Federal Republic of Yugoslavia) Monica Seles defeated (United States) Zina Garrison 6–1, 6–1

- It was Seles' 4th singles title of the year and the 24th of her career.

=== Doubles ===
(United States) Patty Fendick / (United States) Gigi Fernández defeated (Canada) Jill Hetherington / (United States) Kathy Rinaldi 7–5, 6–4
