= 1988 Virginia Slims of Houston – Singles =

Singles
- 1988 Virginia Slims of Houston

Final
- Champion: (United States) Chris Evert
- Runner-up: (United States) Martina Navratilova
- Score: 6–0, 6–4

Details
- Draw: 32
- Seeds: 8

Events
Singles	Doubles
← 1987 ·	Virginia Slims of Houston	· 1989 →

Chris Evert was the defending champion and won in the final 6–0, 6–4 against Martina Navratilova.

== Seeds ==
A champion seed is indicated in bold text while text in italics indicates the round in which that seed was eliminated.

1. (United States) Martina Navratilova (final)
2. (United States) **Chris Evert (champion)**
3. (United States) Lori McNeil (first round)
4. (United States) Zina Garrison (semifinals)
5. (Spain) Arantxa Sánchez (quarterfinals)
6. (West Germany) Isabel Cueto (quarterfinals)
7. (Argentina) Patricia Tarabini (quarterfinals)
8. (South Africa) Rosalyn Fairbank (first round)

== Draw ==
=== Key ===
- Q = Qualifier
- WC = Wild card
- LL = Lucky loser
- Alt = Alternate
- SE = Special exempt
- PR = Protected ranking
- ITF = ITF entry
- JE = Junior exempt
- w/o = Walkover
- r = Retired
- d = Defaulted
- SR = Special ranking

First round
1	(United States) **M Navratilova**	**7**	**6**
(Czechoslovakia) I Budařová	5	1
(United States) K Kessaris	3	1
(United States) **H Na**	**6**	**6**
(United States) W White	1	2
(Argentina) **M Paz**	**6**	**6**
(United States) T Phelps	3	5
5	(Spain) **A Sánchez**	**6**	**7**
3	(United States) L McNeil	**6**	2	3
(United States) **M Gurney**	4	**6**	**6**
(United States) K Adams	2	3
(United States) **E Hakami**	**6**	**6**
(United States) **C Cunningham**	**6**	**7**
Q	(United States) T Whittington	2	5
(Czechoslovakia) A Holíková	1	3
7	(Argentina) **P Tarabini**	**6**	**6**
6	(West Germany) **I Cueto**	**6**	**6**
(South Africa) K Schimper	2	4
(United States) **A Frazier**	2	**6**	**6**
(United States) M L Daniels	**6**	4	3
(South Africa) **D van Rensburg**	5	**6**	**6**
Q	(United States) D Faber	**7**	3	3
(United States) C MacGregor	2	6
4	(United States) **Z Garrison**	**6**	**7**
8	(South Africa) R Fairbank	4	2
(United States) **G Magers**	**6**	**6**
(United States) P Casale	3	3
(Argentina) **B Fulco**	**6**	**6**
Q	(United States) L Spadea	**7**	2	2
Q	(United States) **L Poruri**	5	**6**	**6**
(Sweden) M Lindström	2	2
2	(United States) **C Evert**	**6**	**6**

Second round
1	(United States) **M Navratilova**	**6**	**6**
(United States) H Na	4	2
(Argentina) M Paz	1	2
5	(Spain) **A Sánchez**	**6**	**6**
(United States) M Gurney	0	4
(United States) **E Hakami**	**6**	**6**
(United States) C Cunningham	**6**	4	3
7	(Argentina) **P Tarabini**	4	**6**	**6**
6	(West Germany) **I Cueto**	**6**	**6**
(United States) A Frazier	4	1
(South Africa) D van Rensburg	2	4
4	(United States) **Z Garrison**	**6**	**6**
(United States) **G Magers**	**7**	0	**7**
(Argentina) B Fulco	6	**6**	5
Q	(United States) L Poruri	1	4
2	(United States) **C Evert**	**6**	**6**

Quarterfinals
1	(United States) **M Navratilova**	**7**	**6**
5	(Spain) A Sánchez	6	2
(United States) **E Hakami**	**w/o**
7	(Argentina) P Tarabini
6	(West Germany) I Cueto	6	1
4	(United States) **Z Garrison**	**7**	**6**
(United States) G Magers	**6**	3	0
2	(United States) **C Evert**	2	**6**	**6**

Semifinals
1	(United States) **M Navratilova**	**6**	**6**
(United States) E Hakami	1	3
4	(United States) Z Garrison	5	2
2	(United States) **C Evert**	**7**	**6**

Final
1	(United States) Martina Navratilova	0	4
2	(United States) **Chris Evert**	**6**	**6**
