= 1993 Virginia Slims of Houston =

- Date: March 22–28
- Edition: 23rd
- Category: Tier II
- Draw: 28S / 16D
- Prize money: $385,000
- Surface: Clay /outdoor
- Location: Houston, Texas, U.S.
- Venue: Westside Tennis Club
- Attendance: 44,779

Champions

Singles
- (Spain) Conchita Martínez

Doubles
- (United States) Katrina Adams / (Netherlands) Manon Bollegraf
← 1992 ·	Virginia Slims of Houston	· 1994 →

The 1993 Virginia Slims of Houston was a women's tennis tournament played on outdoor clay courts at the Westside Tennis Club in Houston, Texas in the United States that was part of Tier II of the 1993 WTA Tour. It was the 23rd edition of the tournament and was held from March 22 through March 28, 1993. Third-seeded Conchita Martínez won the singles title and earned $75,000 first-prize money.

== Finals ==
=== Singles ===
(Spain) Conchita Martínez defeated (Germany) Sabine Hack 6–3, 6–2

- It was Martínez' 2nd singles title of the year and the 13th of her career.

=== Doubles ===
(United States) Katrina Adams / (Netherlands) Manon Bollegraf defeated (Russia) Eugenia Maniokova / (Slovakia) Radka Zrubáková 6–3, 5–7, 7–6^{(9–7)}
