= 1988 Virginia Slims of Houston – Doubles =

Doubles
- 1988 Virginia Slims of Houston
- 1987 Champions: (United States) Kathy Jordan (United States) Martina Navratilova

Final
- Champions: (United States) Katrina Adams (United States) Zina Garrison
- Runners-up: (United States) Lori McNeil (United States) Martina Navratilova
- Score: 6–7, 6–2, 6–4

Events
Singles	Doubles
← 1987 ·	Virginia Slims of Houston	· 1989 →

Kathy Jordan and Martina Navratilova were the defending champions but only Navratilova competed that year with Lori McNeil.

McNeil and Navratilova lost in the final 6–7, 6–2, 6–4 against Katrina Adams and Zina Garrison.

== Seeds ==
Champion seeds are indicated in bold text while text in italics indicates the round in which those seeds were eliminated.

1. (United States) Lori McNeil / (United States) Martina Navratilova (final)
2. (United States) **Katrina Adams** / (United States) **Zina Garrison (champions)**
3. (South Africa) Rosalyn Fairbank / (United States) Candy Reynolds (quarterfinals)
4. (United States) Penny Barg / (Argentina) Mercedes Paz (semifinals)

== Draw ==
=== Key ===
- Q = Qualifier
- WC = Wild card
- LL = Lucky loser
- Alt = Alternate
- SE = Special exempt
- PR = Protected ranking
- ITF = ITF entry
- JE = Junior exempt
- w/o = Walkover
- r = Retired
- d = Defaulted
- SR = Special ranking

First round
1	(United States) **L McNeil** (United States) **M Navratilova**	2	**6**	**6**
(South Africa) K Schimper (United States) W Wood	**6**	2	4
(United States) H Crowe (United States) K Steinmetz	3	5
(Sweden) **J Jonerup** (United States) **J Smoller**	**6**	**7**
3	(South Africa) **R Fairbank** (United States) **C Reynolds**	**6**	**6**
(United States) M Gurney (United States) P Jung	1	3
(United States) **G Magers** (United States) **W White**	**6**	**6**
(United States) M L Daniels (United States) A M Fernandez	1	4
(United States) S Collins (Brazil) T Zambrzycki	4	4
(United States) **A Frazier** (United States) **L Spadea**	**6**	**6**
(Czechoslovakia) I Budařová (United States) H Na	3	1
4	(United States) **P Barg** (Argentina) **M Paz**	**6**	**6**
(United States) Ca MacGregor (United States) Cy MacGregor	6	**7**	4
(Sweden) **M Lindström** (United States) **H Ludloff**	**7**	6	**6**
(United States) E Hakami (Argentina) G Mosca	6	1
2	(United States) **K Adams** (United States) **Z Garrison**	**7**	**6**

Quarterfinals
1	(United States) **L McNeil** (United States) **M Navratilova**	**6**	**6**
(Sweden) J Jonerup (United States) J Smoller	1	3
3	(South Africa) R Fairbank (United States) C Reynolds	2	2
(United States) **G Magers** (United States) **W White**	**6**	**6**
(United States) A Frazier (United States) L Spadea	3	4
4	(United States) **P Barg** (Argentina) **M Paz**	**6**	**6**
(Sweden) M Lindström (United States) H Ludloff	1	1
2	(United States) **K Adams** (United States) **Z Garrison**	**6**	**6**

Semifinals
1	(United States) **L McNeil** (United States) **M Navratilova**	**7**	**6**
(United States) G Magers (United States) W White	6	2
4	(United States) P Barg (Argentina) M Paz	1	4
2	(United States) **K Adams** (United States) **Z Garrison**	**6**	**6**

Final
1	(United States) Lori McNeil (United States) Martina Navratilova	**7**	2	4
2	(United States) **Katrina Adams** (United States) **Zina Garrison**	6	**6**	**6**
