= 1995 Gallery Furniture Championships – Singles =

Singles
- 1995 Gallery Furniture Championships

Final
- Champion: (Germany) Steffi Graf
- Runner-up: (Sweden) Åsa Carlsson
- Score: 6–1, 6–1

Details
- Draw: 28
- Seeds: 8

Events
Singles	Doubles
← 1994 ·	Gallery Furniture Championships	· 1996 →

Sabine Hack was the defending champion but lost in the semifinals to Steffi Graf.

Graf won in the final 6–1, 6–1 against Åsa Carlsson.

== Seeds ==
A champion seed is indicated in bold text while text in italics indicates the round in which that seed was eliminated. The top four seeds received a bye to the second round.

1. (Germany) **Steffi Graf (champion)**
2. n/a
3. (Croatia) Iva Majoli (second round)
4. (United States) Zina Garrison-Jackson (second round)
5. (Germany) Sabine Hack (semifinals)
6. (United States) Ann Grossman (second round)
7. (Italy) Sandra Cecchini (quarterfinals)
8. (United States) Chanda Rubin (second round)

== Draw ==
=== Key ===
- Q = Qualifier
- WC = Wild card
- LL = Lucky loser
- Alt = Alternate
- SE = Special exempt
- PR = Protected ranking
- ITF = ITF entry
- JE = Junior exempt
- w/o = Walkover
- r = Retired
- d = Defaulted
- SR = Special ranking

=== Final ===
Final
1	(Germany) **Steffi Graf**	**6**	**6**
	(Sweden) Åsa Carlsson	1	1

=== Section 1 ===
First round
Q	(Sweden) **M Strandlund**	**6**	**6**
(United States) K Po	1	2
(United States) **T Whitlinger-Jones**	**7**	**6**
(Poland) K Nowak	5	3
(France) A Fusai	2	6
6	(United States) **A Grossman**	**6**	**7**
Q	(Georgia (country)) **N Louarsabishvili**	**6**	**6**
Q	(Spain) V Ruano-Pascual	3	0
(Israel) A Smashnova	3	2
Q	(United States) **E deLone**	**6**	**6**
(Germany) S Frankl	0	2
5	(Germany) **S Hack**	**6**	**6**

Second round
1	(Germany) **S Graf**	**6**	**6**
Q	(Sweden) M Strandlund	2	1
(United States) **T Whitlinger-Jones**	**6**	**6**
6	(United States) A Grossman	4	0
3	(Croatia) I Majoli	**6**	4	6
Q	(Georgia (country)) **N Louarsabishvili**	3	**6**	**7**
Q	(United States) E deLone	5	4
5	(Germany) **S Hack**	**7**	**6**

Quarterfinals
1	(Germany) **S Graf**	**6**	**6**
(United States) T Whitlinger-Jones	2	1
Q	(Georgia (country)) N Louarsabishvili	1	4
5	(Germany) **S Hack**	**6**	**6**

Semifinals
1	(Germany) **S Graf**	**6**	**6**
5	(Germany) S Hack	2	2

=== Section 2 ===
First round
8	(United States) **C Rubin**	**6**	**6**
(United States) N Arendt	2	3
(Argentina) B Fulco-Villella	1	3
(Sweden) **Å Carlsson**	**6**	**6**
(South Africa) **J Kruger**	**6**	**6**
(United States) S Stafford	3	2
7	(Italy) **S Cecchini**	**6**	**6**
WC	(United States) S Halsell	3	0
(United States) D Graham	3	5
WC	(Spain) **M Sánchez Lorenzo**	**6**	**7**
(United States) S Cacic	1	3
(Germany) **M Babel**	**6**	**6**

Second round
8	(United States) C Rubin	2	**7**	2
(Sweden) **Å Carlsson**	**6**	6	**6**
(South Africa) **J Kruger**	**6**	6	**6**
4	(United States) Z Garrison-Jackson	2	**7**	2
7	(Italy) **S Cecchini**	**6**	6	**6**
WC	(Spain) M Sánchez Lorenzo	1	**7**	2
(Germany) M Babel	**7**	5	2
LL	(Germany) **W Probst**	5	**7**	**6**

Quarterfinals
(Sweden) **Å Carlsson**	**6**	**7**
(South Africa) J Kruger	3	6
7	(Italy) S Cecchini	4	3
LL	(Germany) **W Probst**	**6**	**6**

Semifinals
(Sweden) **Å Carlsson**	**6**	**6**
LL	(Germany) W Probst	4	3
