= 1995 Gallery Furniture Championships – Doubles =

Doubles
- 1995 Gallery Furniture Championships
- 1994 Champions: (Netherlands) Manon Bollegraf (United States) Martina Navratilova

Final
- Champions: (United States) Nicole Arendt (Netherlands) Manon Bollegraf
- Runners-up: (Germany) Wiltrud Probst (Canada) Rene Simpson
- Score: 6–4, 6–2

Details
- Draw: 16
- Seeds: 4

Events
Singles	Doubles
← 1994 ·	Gallery Furniture Championships	· 1996 →

Manon Bollegraf and Martina Navratilova were the defending champions but only Bollegraf competed that year with Nicole Arendt.

Arendt and Bollegraf won in the final 6–4, 6–2 against Wiltrud Probst and Rene Simpson.

== Seeds ==
Champion seeds are indicated in bold text while text in italics indicates the round in which those seeds were eliminated.

1. (United States) **Nicole Arendt** / (Netherlands) **Manon Bollegraf (champions)**
2. (United States) Katrina Adams / (United States) Zina Garrison-Jackson (quarterfinals)
3. (Italy) Sandra Cecchini / (Argentina) Patricia Tarabini (quarterfinals)
4. (Germany) Wiltrud Probst / (Canada) Rene Simpson (final)

== Draw ==
=== Key ===
- Q = Qualifier
- WC = Wild card
- LL = Lucky loser
- Alt = Alternate
- SE = Special exempt
- PR = Protected ranking
- ITF = ITF entry
- JE = Junior exempt
- w/o = Walkover
- r = Retired
- d = Defaulted
- SR = Special ranking

First round
1	(United States) **N Arendt** (Netherlands) **M Bollegraf**	**6**	**6**
WC	(United States) Ra Jensen (United States) Re Jensen	1	2
(Sweden) **M Lindström** (Sweden) **M Strandlund**	3	**6**	**6**
(Germany) M Babel (United States) T Whitlinger-Jones	**6**	3	3
3	(Italy) **S Cecchini** (Argentina) **P Tarabini**	**7**	**6**
(South Africa) J Kruger (Croatia) I Majoli	5	4
(Sweden) **Å Carlsson** (France) **A Fusai**	**6**	**6**
(United Kingdom) V Lake (United States) K Po	4	2
(United States) B Bowes-Hackney (United States) M Tu	1	6
(Argentina) **M Paz** (United States) **S Stafford**	**6**	**7**
(United States) E deLone (Australia) N Pratt	3	4
4	(Germany) **W Probst** (Canada) **R Simpson**	**6**	**6**
Q	(Argentina) B Fulco-Villella (Spain) V Ruano-Pascual	2	**6**	2
(France) **S Amiach** (United States) **V Paynter**	**6**	4	**6**
(United States) D Graham (United States) A Grossman	2	1
2	(United States) **K Adams** (United States) **Z Garrison-Jackson**	**6**	**6**

Quarterfinals
1	(United States) **N Arendt** (Netherlands) **M Bollegraf**	**6**	**6**
(Sweden) M Lindström (Sweden) M Strandlund	1	3
3	(Italy) S Cecchini (Argentina) P Tarabini	2	5
(Sweden) **Å Carlsson** (France) **A Fusai**	**6**	**7**
(Argentina) M Paz (United States) S Stafford	5	**6**	4
4	(Germany) **W Probst** (Canada) **R Simpson**	**7**	4	**6**
(France) **S Amiach** (United States) **V Paynter**	**7**	**6**
2	(United States) K Adams (United States) Z Garrison-Jackson	5	3

Semifinals
1	(United States) **N Arendt** (Netherlands) **M Bollegraf**	**6**	**6**
(Sweden) Å Carlsson (France) A Fusai	1	2
4	(Germany) **W Probst** (Canada) **R Simpson**	**7**	**7**
(France) S Amiach (United States) V Paynter	6	5

Final
1	(United States) **Nicole Arendt** (Netherlands) **Manon Bollegraf**	**6**	**6**
4	(Germany) Wiltrud Probst (Canada) Rene Simpson	4	2
