= 1995 Gallery Furniture Championships =

- Date: April 10–16
- Edition: 25th
- Category: Tier II
- Draw: 28S / 16D
- Prize money: $430,000
- Surface: Clay / outdoor
- Location: Houston, Texas, U.S.
- Venue: Westside Tennis Club

Champions

Singles
- (Germany) Steffi Graf

Doubles
- (United States) Nicole Arendt / (Netherlands) Manon Bollegraf
← 1994 ·	Virginia Slims of Houston

The 1995 Gallery Furniture Championships was a women's tennis tournament played on outdoor clay courts at the Westside Tennis Club in Houston, Texas in the United States that was part of Tier II of the 1995 WTA Tour. It was the 25th and last edition of the tournament and was held from April 10 through April 16, 1995. First-seeded Steffi Graf won the singles title and earned $79,000 first-prize money.

== Finals ==
=== Singles ===
(Germany) Steffi Graf defeated (Sweden) Åsa Carlsson 6–1, 6–1

- It was Graf's 4th singles title of the year and the 90th of her career.

=== Doubles ===
(United States) Nicole Arendt / (Netherlands) Manon Bollegraf defeated (Germany) Wiltrud Probst / (Canada) Rene Simpson 6–4, 6–2

- It was Arendt's 3rd title of the year and the 5th of her career. It was Bollegraf's 2nd title of the year and the 18th of her career.
