= 1991 Virginia Slims of Houston – Doubles =

Doubles
- 1991 Virginia Slims of Houston

Final
- Champions: (Canada) Jill Hetherington (United States) Kathy Rinaldi
- Runners-up: (United States) Patty Fendick (United States) Mary Joe Fernández
- Score: 6–1, 2–6, 6–1

Details
- Draw: 16 (1WC/1Q)
- Seeds: 4

Events
Singles	Doubles
← 1990 ·	Virginia Slims of Houston	· 1992 →

There was no doubles tournament last year due to inclement weather. Katrina Adams and Zina Garrison, winners of the 1989 edition, lost in the quarterfinals to Jill Hetherington and Kathy Rinaldi.

Hetherington and Rinaldi won the title by defeating Patty Fendick and Mary Joe Fernández 6–1, 2–6, 6–1 in the final.

== Seeds ==
1. (United States) Patty Fendick / (United States) Mary Joe Fernández (final)
2. (United States) Katrina Adams / (United States) Zina Garrison (quarterfinals, withdrew)
3. (United States) Gretchen Magers / (United States) Robin White (semifinals)
4. (United States) Mary Lou Daniels / (South Africa) Lise Gregory (first round)

== Draw ==
=== Key ===
- Q = Qualifier
- WC = Wild card
- LL = Lucky loser
- Alt = Alternate
- SE = Special exempt
- PR = Protected ranking
- ITF = ITF entry
- JE = Junior exempt
- w/o = Walkover
- r = Retired
- d = Defaulted
- SR = Special ranking

=== Draw ===
First round
1	(United States) P Fendick (United States) MJ Fernández	4	6	6
(Italy) S Cecchini (Argentina) P Tarabini	6	3	2
(United States) S Collins (United States) S Rehe	3	4
(Netherlands) G Coorengel (Netherlands) A van Buuren	6	6
4	(United States) ML Daniels (South Africa) L Gregory	5	2
(United States) E Burgin (Argentina) M Paz	7	6
(United States) A Grossman (United States) Cy MacGregor	1	4
(United States) Ca MacGregor (United States) P Mager	6	6
Q	(United States) L Harvey Wild (United States) T Whitlinger	6	6
(South Africa) R Field (Italy) L Garrone	2	3
WC	(United States) L McNeil (United States) C Rubin	5	7^{7}	1
3	(United States) G Magers (United States) R White	7	6^{2}	6
(Canada) J Hetherington (United States) K Rinaldi	3	6	7^{7}
(Czechoslovakia) P Langrová (Czechoslovakia) R Zrubáková	6	2	6^{2}
(France) S Amiach (Sweden) M Lindström	4	5
2	(United States) K Adams (United States) Z Garrison	6	7

Quarterfinals
1	(United States) P Fendick (United States) MJ Fernández	6	6
(Netherlands) G Coorengel (Netherlands) A van Buuren	2	0
(United States) E Burgin (Argentina) M Paz	4	7^{8}	6
(United States) Ca MacGregor (United States) P Mager	6	6^{6}	3
Q	(United States) L Harvey Wild (United States) T Whitlinger	2	3
3	(United States) G Magers (United States) R White	6	6
(Canada) J Hetherington (United States) K Rinaldi	w/o
2	(United States) K Adams (United States) Z Garrison

Semifinals
1	(United States) P Fendick (United States) MJ Fernández	7^{7}	6^{5}	6
(United States) E Burgin (Argentina) M Paz	6^{5}	7^{7}	3
3	(United States) G Magers (United States) R White	5	1
(Canada) J Hetherington (United States) K Rinaldi	7	6

Final
1	(United States) P Fendick (United States) MJ Fernández	1	6	1
(Canada) J Hetherington (United States) K Rinaldi	6	2	6
