= 1980 Avon Championships of Houston =

- Date: February 25 – March 2
- Edition: 10th
- Category: Virginia Slims circuit
- Draw: 64S / 16D
- Prize money: $150,000
- Surface: Carpet (Sporteze) / indoor
- Location: Houston, Texas, U.S.
- Venue: The Summit

Champions

Singles
- (United States) Billie Jean King

Doubles
- (United States) Billie Jean King / (South Africa) Ilana Kloss
← 1979 ·	Virginia Slims of Houston	· 1981 →

The 1980 Avon Championships of Houston was a women's tennis tournament played on indoor carpet courts at the Summit in Houston, Texas in the United States that was part of the 1980 Avon Championships Circuit. It was the 10th edition of the tournament and was held from February 25 through March 2, 1980. Third-seeded Billie Jean King won the singles title and earned $30,000 first-prize money.

== Finals ==
=== Singles ===
(United States) Billie Jean King defeated (United States) Martina Navratilova 6–1, 6–3

- It was King's 2nd title of the year and the 125th of her career.

=== Doubles ===
(United States) Billie Jean King / (South Africa) Ilana Kloss defeated (Netherlands) Betty Stöve / (Australia) Wendy Turnbull 3–6, 6–1, 6–4

== Prize money ==
Event	W	F	3rd	4th	QF	Round of 16	Round of 32
Singles	$30,000	$15,000	$7,500	$7,200	$3,500	$1,750	$700
