= 1989 Virginia Slims of Houston – Singles =

Singles
- 1989 Virginia Slims of Houston

Final
- Champion: (Socialist Federal Republic of Yugoslavia) Monica Seles
- Runner-up: (United States) Chris Evert
- Score: 3–6, 6–1, 6–4

Details
- Draw: 32
- Seeds: 8

Events
Singles	Doubles
← 1988 ·	Virginia Slims of Houston	· 1990 →

Chris Evert was the defending champion but lost in the final 3–6, 6–1, 6–4 against Monica Seles.

== Seeds ==
A champion seed is indicated in bold text while text in italics indicates the round in which that seed was eliminated.

1. (United States) Chris Evert (final)
2. (United States) Zina Garrison (second round)
3. (Bulgaria) Katerina Maleeva (first round)
4. (United States) Lori McNeil (quarterfinals)
5. (United States) Susan Sloane (semifinals)
6. (United States) Amy Frazier (second round)
7. (West Germany) Isabel Cueto (first round)
8. (United States) Gretchen Magers (quarterfinals)

== Draw ==
=== Key ===
- Q = Qualifier
- WC = Wild card
- LL = Lucky loser
- Alt = Alternate
- SE = Special exempt
- PR = Protected ranking
- ITF = ITF entry
- JE = Junior exempt
- w/o = Walkover
- r = Retired
- d = Defaulted
- SR = Special ranking

First round
1	(United States) **C Evert**	**6**	**6**
(South Africa) K Schimper	1	2
(United States) **K Rinaldi**	**7**	2	**6**
(United States) M Torres	5	**6**	3
(United States) D Faber	**6**	6	3
(United States) **K Adams**	3	**7**	**6**
(Czechoslovakia) I Budařová	**6**	4	3
8	(United States) **G Magers**	4	**6**	**6**
4	(United States) **L McNeil**	4	**6**	**6**
(United States) E Hakami	**6**	3	4
LL	(United States) **L Poruri**	**6**	**6**
(United States) M Gurney	3	1
(Greece) **A Kanellopoulou**	**6**	**6**
(United States) K Gompert	3	2
Q	(United States) P Casale	0	1
5	(United States) **S Sloane**	**6**	**6**
7	(West Germany) I Cueto	**6**	4	4
(United States) **E Burgin**	4	**6**	**6**
LL	(United States) **K Kessaris**	**7**	**6**
Q	(United States) A Schwartz	5	0
Q	(Canada) M Drake	2	6
(United States) **H Na**	**6**	**7**
(United States) **C Cunningham**	4	**7**	**6**
3	(Bulgaria) K Maleeva	**6**	5	2
6	(United States) **A Frazier**	**6**	**6**
(Czechoslovakia) A Holíková	2	2
(Socialist Federal Republic of Yugoslavia) **M Seles**	**6**	**6**
(United States) M L Daniels	2	3
(Hungary) **A Temesvári**	**6**	**6**
(France) M Pierce	2	3
Q	(South Africa) M de Swardt	2	5
2	(United States) **Z Garrison**	**6**	**7**

Second round
1	(United States) **C Evert**	**6**	**6**
(United States) K Rinaldi	0	3
(United States) K Adams	4	2
8	(United States) **G Magers**	**6**	**6**
4	(United States) **L McNeil**	**7**	**6**
LL	(United States) L Poruri	6	4
(Greece) A Kanellopoulou	4	**6**	5
5	(United States) **S Sloane**	**6**	3	**7**
(United States) E Burgin	6	1
LL	(United States) **K Kessaris**	**7**	**6**
(United States) H Na	**6**	2	4
(United States) **C Cunningham**	2	**6**	**6**
6	(United States) A Frazier	**7**	4	2
(Socialist Federal Republic of Yugoslavia) **M Seles**	5	**6**	**6**
(Hungary) **A Temesvári**	**6**	6	**6**
2	(United States) Z Garrison	3	**7**	2

Quarterfinals
1	(United States) **C Evert**	**7**	**6**
8	(United States) G Magers	6	3
4	(United States) L McNeil	2	4
5	(United States) **S Sloane**	**6**	**6**
LL	(United States) K Kessaris	1	3
(United States) **C Cunningham**	**6**	**6**
(Socialist Federal Republic of Yugoslavia) **M Seles**	**6**	**7**
(Hungary) A Temesvári	2	5

Semifinals
1	(United States) **C Evert**	**7**	**6**
5	(United States) S Sloane	6	2
(United States) C Cunningham	0	1
(Socialist Federal Republic of Yugoslavia) **M Seles**	**6**	**6**

Final
1	(United States) Chris Evert	**6**	1	4
(Socialist Federal Republic of Yugoslavia) **Monica Seles**	3	**6**	**6**
