= 1994 Virginia Slims of Houston – Doubles =

Doubles
- 1994 Virginia Slims of Houston
- 1993 Champions: (United States) Katrina Adams (Netherlands) Manon Bollegraf

Final
- Champions: (Netherlands) Manon Bollegraf (United States) Martina Navratilova
- Runners-up: (United States) Katrina Adams (United States) Zina Garrison-Jackson
- Score: 6–4, 6–2

Events
Singles	Doubles
← 1993 ·	Virginia Slims of Houston	· 1995 →

Katrina Adams and Manon Bollegraf were the defending champions but they competed with different partners that year, Adams with Zina Garrison-Jackson and Bollegraf with Martina Navratilova.

Adams and Garrison-Jackson lost in the final 6–4, 6–2 against Bollegraf and Navratilova.

== Seeds ==
Champion seeds are indicated in bold text while text in italics indicates the round in which those seeds were eliminated.

1. (Netherlands) **Manon Bollegraf** / (United States) **Martina Navratilova (champions)**
2. (United States) Katrina Adams / (United States) Zina Garrison-Jackson (final)
3. (Italy) Sandra Cecchini / (Argentina) Patricia Tarabini (semifinals)
4. (Bulgaria) Magdalena Maleeva / (Spain) Conchita Martínez (quarterfinals)

== Draw ==
=== Key ===
- Q = Qualifier
- WC = Wild card
- LL = Lucky loser
- Alt = Alternate
- SE = Special exempt
- PR = Protected ranking
- ITF = ITF entry
- JE = Junior exempt
- w/o = Walkover
- r = Retired
- d = Defaulted
- SR = Special ranking

First round
1	(Netherlands) **M Bollegraf** (United States) **M Navratilova**	**6**	**6**
(Russia) E Maniokova (Georgia (country)) L Meskhi	0	1
(Croatia) I Majoli (Croatia) M Murić	**6**	2	1
(Italy) **L Golarsa** (Argentina) **M Paz**	3	**6**	**6**
4	(Bulgaria) **M Maleeva** (Spain) **C Martínez**	**6**	1	**6**
(Netherlands) N Muns-Jagerman (Germany) W Probst	4	**6**	2
(France) **M Pierce** (Hungary) **A Temesvári**	**6**	**6**
(United Kingdom) J Durie (Germany) K Kschwendt	4	3
WC	(United States) **S Gilchrist** (United States) **V Paynter**	**6**	**6**
(United States) C Benjamin (United States) A Grossman	4	4
(United States) S Collins (Germany) B Rittner	4	**7**	4
3	(Italy) **S Cecchini** (Argentina) **P Tarabini**	**6**	5	**6**
Q	(Brazil) L Tella (Brazil) A Vieira	5	0
(Germany) **M Babel** (Belgium) **D Monami**	**7**	**6**
LL	(Argentina) M Díaz Oliva (Argentina) L Montalvo	2	2
2	(United States) **K Adams** (United States) **Z Garrison-Jackson**	**6**	**6**

Quarterfinals
1	(Netherlands) **M Bollegraf** (United States) **M Navratilova**	**6**	**6**
(Italy) L Golarsa (Argentina) M Paz	3	4
4	(Bulgaria) M Maleeva (Spain) C Martínez	**6**	6	2
(France) **M Pierce** (Hungary) **A Temesvári**	4	**7**	**6**
WC	(United States) S Gilchrist (United States) V Paynter	4	2
3	(Italy) **S Cecchini** (Argentina) **P Tarabini**	**6**	**6**
(Germany) M Babel (Belgium) D Monami	4	0
2	(United States) **K Adams** (United States) **Z Garrison-Jackson**	**6**	**6**

Semifinals
1	(Netherlands) **M Bollegraf** (United States) **M Navratilova**	**7**	4	**6**
(France) M Pierce (Hungary) A Temesvári	6	**6**	3
3	(Italy) S Cecchini (Argentina) P Tarabini	**6**	3	6
2	(United States) **K Adams** (United States) **Z Garrison-Jackson**	2	**6**	**7**

Final
1	(Netherlands) **Manon Bollegraf** (United States) **Martina Navratilova**	**6**	**6**
2	(United States) Katrina Adams (United States) Zina Garrison-Jackson	4	2
