= 1983 Virginia Slims of Houston =

- Date: January 10–16
- Edition: 13th
- Draw: 32S / 16D
- Prize money: $150,000
- Surface: Carpet / indoor
- Location: Houston, TX, United States
- Venue: Astro Arena

Champions

Singles
- (United States) Martina Navratilova

Doubles
- (United States) Martina Navratilova / (United States) Pam Shriver
← 1982 ·	Virginia Slims of Houston	· 1984 →

The 1983 Virginia Slims of Houston was a women's tennis tournament played on indoor carpet courts at the Astro Arena in Houston, Texas in the United States that was part of the 1983 Virginia Slims World Championship Series. The tournament was held from January 10 through January 16, 1983. First-seeded Martina Navratilova won the singles title and earned $28,000 first-prize money.

== Finals ==
=== Singles ===
(United States) Martina Navratilova defeated (West Germany) Sylvia Hanika 6–3, 7–6^{(7–5)}

- It was Navratilova's 3rd title of the year and the 150th of her career.

=== Doubles ===
(United States) Martina Navratilova / (United States) Pam Shriver defeated (United Kingdom) Jo Durie / (United States) Barbara Potter 6–4, 6–3

- It was Navrtilova's 4th title of the year and the 151st of her career. It was Shriver's 2nd title of the year and the 36th of her career.

== Prize money ==
Event	W	F	SF	QF	Round of 16	Prel. round
Singles	$28,000	$14,000	$7,000	$3,350	$1,675	$825
