= 1993 Virginia Slims of Houston – Singles =

Singles
- 1993 Virginia Slims of Houston

Final
- Champion: (Spain) Conchita Martínez
- Runner-up: (Germany) Sabine Hack
- Score: 6–3, 6–2

Details
- Draw: 28 (4Q/1LL)
- Seeds: 9

Events
Singles	Doubles
← 1992 ·	Virginia Slims of Houston	· 1994 →

Monica Seles was the defending champion, but did not compete this year.

Conchita Martínez won the title by defeating Sabine Hack 6–3, 6–2 in the final.

== Seeds ==
The top four seeds received a bye to the second round.

1. (Argentina) Gabriela Sabatini (semifinals)
2. (United States) Jennifer Capriati (second round)
3. (Spain) Conchita Martínez (champion)
4. (Czechoslovakia) Jana Novotná (semifinals)
5. (Switzerland) Manuela Maleeva-Fragnière (first round)
6. (France) ~~Mary Pierce~~ (withdrew)
7. (Bulgaria) Katerina Maleeva (second round)
8. (France) Julie Halard (second round)
9. (Slovakia) Radka Zrubáková (quarterfinals)

== Draw ==
=== Key ===
- Q = Qualifier
- WC = Wild card
- LL = Lucky loser
- Alt = Alternate
- SE = Special exempt
- PR = Protected ranking
- ITF = ITF entry
- JE = Junior exempt
- w/o = Walkover
- r = Retired
- d = Defaulted
- SR = Special ranking

=== Finals ===
Semifinals
1	(Argentina) Gabriela Sabatini	3	3
3	(Spain) Conchita Martínez	6	6
4	(Czech Republic) Jana Novotná	6	6^{6}	6^{9}
(Germany) Sabine Hack	4	7^{8}	7^{11}

Final
3	(Spain) Conchita Martínez	6	6
(Germany) Sabine Hack	3	2

=== Top half ===
First round
(Australia) A Minter	3	1
(United States) D Graham	6	6
(United States) L Harvey-Wild	3	7	3
(Italy) S Cecchini	6	5	6
(Germany) K Kschwendt	3	6	3
7	(Bulgaria) K Maleeva	6	2	6
(United Kingdom) J Durie	6	2	3
(Greece) C Papadáki	3	6	6
Q	(Australia) T Morton	5	1
Q	(Spain) V Ruano Pascual	7	6
Q	(Argentina) P Tarabini	6	6
5	(Switzerland) M Maleeva-Fragnière	3	1

Second round
1	(Argentina) G Sabatini	6	6
(United States) D Graham	0	1
(Italy) S Cecchini	7^{7}	6
7	(Bulgaria) K Maleeva	6^{3}	0
3	(Spain) C Martínez	6	6
(Greece) C Papadáki	1	0
Q	(Spain) V Ruano Pascual	4	1
Q	(Argentina) P Tarabini	6	6

Quarterfinals
1	(Argentina) G Sabatini	6	6
(Italy) S Cecchini	2	1
3	(Spain) C Martínez	6	6
Q	(Argentina) P Tarabini	3	2

Semifinals
1	(Argentina) G Sabatini	3	3
3	(Spain) C Martínez	6	6

=== Bottom half ===
First round
9	(Slovakia) R Zrubáková	3	7	7^{7}
(Hungary) A Temesvári	6	5	6^{3}
(United States) C Kuhlman	4	4
Q	(Canada) R Simpson-Alter	6	6
(Argentina) B Fulco-Villella	6	2	6
(Germany) V Martinek	0	6	3
8	(France) J Halard	7^{7}	6
(Argentina) F Labat	6^{3}	2
(Germany) S Hack	2	6	6
(Italy) L Ferrando	6	2	2
(Belarus) T Ignatieva	6	6
LL	(Italy) L Golarsa	3	2

Second round
9	(Slovakia) R Zrubáková	6	5	6
Q	(Canada) R Simpson-Alter	1	7	2
(Argentina) B Fulco-Villella	3	2
4	(Czechoslovakia) J Novotná	6	6
8	(France) J Halard	6	2	3
(Germany) S Hack	2	6	6
(Belarus) T Ignatieva	2	7^{9}	6
2	(United States) J Capriati	6	6^{7}	2

Quarterfinals
9	(Slovakia) R Zrubáková	3	5
4	(Czechoslovakia) J Novotná	6	7
(Germany) S Hack	6	6
(Belarus) T Ignatieva	0	3

Semifinals
4	(Czechoslovakia) J Novotná	6	6^{6}	6^{9}
(Germany) S Hack	4	7^{8}	7^{11}
