= 1992 Virginia Slims of Houston – Singles =

Singles
- 1992 Virginia Slims of Houston

Final
- Champion: (Socialist Federal Republic of Yugoslavia) Monica Seles
- Runner-up: (United States) Zina Garrison
- Score: 6–1, 6–1

Details
- Draw: 28 (2WC/4Q/3LL)
- Seeds: 8

Events
Singles	Doubles
← 1991 ·	Virginia Slims of Houston	· 1993 →

Monica Seles successfully defended her title by defeating Zina Garrison 6–1, 6–1 in the final.

== Seeds ==
The first four seeds received a bye into the second round.

1. (Socialist Federal Republic of Yugoslavia) Monica Seles (champion)
2. (Bulgaria) Katerina Maleeva (semifinals)
3. (United States) Zina Garrison (final)
4. (United States) Gigi Fernández (quarterfinals)
5. (United States) Lori McNeil (second round)
6. (Peru) Laura Gildemeister (semifinals)
7. (Italy) Sandra Cecchini (quarterfinals)
8. (Bulgaria) Magdalena Maleeva (second round)

== Draw ==
=== Key ===
- Q = Qualifier
- WC = Wild card
- LL = Lucky loser
- Alt = Alternate
- SE = Special exempt
- PR = Protected ranking
- ITF = ITF entry
- JE = Junior exempt
- w/o = Walkover
- r = Retired
- d = Defaulted
- SR = Special ranking

=== Finals ===
Semifinals
1	(Socialist Federal Republic of Yugoslavia) Monica Seles	6	6
6	(Peru) Laura Gildemeister	4	1
3	(United States) Zina Garrison	6	6
2	(Bulgaria) Katerina Maleeva	1	3

Final
1	(Socialist Federal Republic of Yugoslavia) Monica Seles	6	6
3	(United States) Zina Garrison	1	1

=== Top half ===
First round
(Argentina) M Paz	6	7
(United States) K Adams	1	5
(United States) A Keller	3	0
(Argentina) B Fulco-Villella	6	6
Q	(United States) Ca MacGregor	3	2
8	(Bulgaria) M Maleeva	6	6
(United States) C Rubin	6^{3}	6	6
Q	(United States) L Allen	7^{7}	3	3
(United States) H Cioffi	6	6
Q	(United States) P O'Reilly	1	2
(Italy) F Bonsignori	2	0
6	(Peru) L Gildemeister	6	6

Second round
1	(Socialist Federal Republic of Yugoslavia) M Seles	6	6
(Argentina) M Paz	0	0
(Argentina) B Fulco-Villella	6	6
8	(Bulgaria) M Maleeva	4	3
4	(United States) G Fernández	6	6
(United States) C Rubin	1	3
(United States) H Cioffi	2	1
6	(Peru) L Gildemeister	6	6

Quarterfinals
1	(Socialist Federal Republic of Yugoslavia) M Seles	6	6
(Argentina) B Fulco-Villella	1	0
4	(United States) G Fernández	4	6	1
6	(Peru) L Gildemeister	6	3	6

Semifinals
1	(Socialist Federal Republic of Yugoslavia) M Seles	6	6
6	(Peru) L Gildemeister	4	1

=== Bottom half ===
First round
5	(United States) L McNeil	7	7^{7}
WC	(United States) G Magers	5	6^{5}
WC	(Croatia) I Majoli	6	6
LL	(United States) L Davenport	3	4
LL	(United States) J Santrock	5	4
Q	(United States) E Burgin	7	6
7	(Italy) S Cecchini	3	6	6
(United States) L Harvey Wild	6	3	3
(Germany) S Hack	6	6
LL	(Mexico) A Gavaldón	3	3
(United States) P Fendick	5	5
(Canada) R Simpson	7	7

Second round
5	(United States) L McNeil	3	3
WC	(Croatia) I Majoli	6	6
Q	(United States) E Burgin	1	4
3	(United States) Z Garrison	6	6
7	(Italy) S Cecchini	7^{7}	7^{7}
(Germany) S Hack	6^{2}	6^{3}
(Canada) R Simpson	2	6^{2}
2	(Bulgaria) K Maleeva	6	7^{7}

Quarterfinals
WC	(Croatia) I Majoli	3	4
3	(United States) Z Garrison	6	6
7	(Italy) S Cecchini	2	3
2	(Bulgaria) K Maleeva	6	6

Semifinals
3	(United States) Z Garrison	6	6
2	(Bulgaria) K Maleeva	1	3
