= 1991 Virginia Slims of Houston – Singles =

Singles
- 1991 Virginia Slims of Houston

Final
- Champion: (Socialist Federal Republic of Yugoslavia) Monica Seles
- Runner-up: (United States) Mary Joe Fernández
- Score: 6–4, 6–3

Details
- Draw: 28 (2WC/4Q/1LL)
- Seeds: 8

Events
Singles	Doubles
← 1990 ·	Virginia Slims of Houston	· 1992 →

Katerina Maleeva was the defending champion, but lost in the second round to Christína Papadáki.

Monica Seles won the title by defeating Mary Joe Fernández 6–4, 6–3 in the final.

== Seeds ==
The first four seeds received a bye into the second round.

1. (Socialist Federal Republic of Yugoslavia) Monica Seles (champion)
2. (United States) Mary Joe Fernández (final)
3. (United States) Zina Garrison (second round)
4. (Bulgaria) Katerina Maleeva (quarterfinals)
5. (Soviet Union) ~~Leila Meskhi~~ (withdrew)
6. (Italy) Sandra Cecchini (semifinals)
7. (United States) Susan Sloane (first round)
8. (Argentina) Mercedes Paz (first round)
9. (United States) Gretchen Magers (first round)

== Draw ==
=== Key ===
- Q = Qualifier
- WC = Wild card
- LL = Lucky loser
- Alt = Alternate
- SE = Special exempt
- PR = Protected ranking
- ITF = ITF entry
- JE = Junior exempt
- w/o = Walkover
- r = Retired
- d = Defaulted
- SR = Special ranking

=== Finals ===
Semifinals
1	(Socialist Federal Republic of Yugoslavia) Monica Seles	6	6
6	(Italy) Sandra Cecchini	0	2
(United States) Linda Harvey Wild	0	3
2	(United States) Mary Joe Fernández	6	6

Final
1	(Socialist Federal Republic of Yugoslavia) Monica Seles	6	6
2	(United States) Mary Joe Fernández	4	3

=== Top half ===
First round
(Czechoslovakia) R Zrubáková	6	6
(Czechoslovakia) P Langrová	2	2
(Argentina) P Tarabini	7^{7}	6
(United States) S Rehe	6^{2}	2
(Italy) F Bonsignori	6	6
7	(United States) S Sloane	0	0
WC	(Greece) C Papadáki	6	6
(Canada) P Hy	4	3
Q	(United States) L Allen	2	3
LL	(United States) Ca MacGregor	6	6
WC	(United States) P Nelson	4	2
6	(Italy) S Cecchini	6	6

Second round
1	(Socialist Federal Republic of Yugoslavia) M Seles	6	6
(Czechoslovakia) R Zrubáková	0	2
(Argentina) P Tarabini	4	4
(Italy) F Bonsignori	6	6
4	(Bulgaria) K Maleeva	6	6
WC	(Greece) C Papadáki	3	2
LL	(United States) Ca MacGregor	1	3
6	(Italy) S Cecchini	6	6

Quarterfinals
1	(Socialist Federal Republic of Yugoslavia) M Seles	6	6
(Italy) F Bonsignori	1	0
4	(Bulgaria) K Maleeva	6	4	1
6	(Italy) S Cecchini	3	6	6

Semifinals
1	(Socialist Federal Republic of Yugoslavia) M Seles	6	6
6	(Italy) S Cecchini	0	2

=== Bottom half ===
First round
9	(United States) G Magers	4	6	4
(United States) T Whitlinger	6	1	6
(United States) L Harvey Wild	6	4	6
Q	(Argentina) G Mosca	1	6	1
(United States) G Fernández	4	7	6
(United States) ML Daniels	6	5	4
8	(Argentina) M Paz	3	1
Q	(United Kingdom) S Smith	6	6
(United States) A Grossman	6	3	7^{7}
Q	(Italy) S La Fratta	1	6	6^{0}
(Italy) L Garrone	6	3	1
(United States) H Cioffi	1	6	6

Second round
(United States) T Whitlinger	4	3
(United States) L Harvey Wild	6	6
(United States) G Fernández	6^{5}	6	7
3	(United States) Z Garrison	7^{7}	1	5
Q	(United Kingdom) S Smith	4	1
(United States) A Grossman	6	6
(United States) H Cioffi
2	(United States) MJ Fernández	w/o

Quarterfinals
(United States) L Harvey Wild	6	6
(United States) G Fernández	4	1
(United States) A Grossman	5	5
2	(United States) MJ Fernández	7	7

Semifinals
(United States) L Harvey Wild	0	3
2	(United States) MJ Fernández	6	6
