= 1982 Avon Championships of Houston =

- Date: February 15–21
- Edition: 12th
- Category: Virginia Slims circuit
- Draw: 17S / 10D
- Prize money: $100,000
- Surface: Carpet (Sporteze) / indoor
- Location: Houston, Texas, U.S.
- Venue: The Summit

Champions

Singles
- (West Germany) Bettina Bunge

Doubles
- (United States) Kathy Jordan / (United States) Ann Kiyomura
← 1981 ·	Virginia Slims of Houston	· 1983 →

The 1982 Avon Championships of Houston was a women's tennis tournament played on indoor carpet courts at the Summit in Houston, Texas in the United States that was part of the 1982 Avon Championships Circuit. It was the 12th edition of the tournament and was held from February 15 through to February 21, 1982. Third-seeded Bettina Bunge won the singles title and earned $22,000 first-prize money.

== Finals ==
=== Singles ===
(West Germany) Bettina Bunge defeated (United States) Pam Shriver 6–2, 3–6, 6–2

- It was Bunge's 1st singles title of her career.

=== Doubles ===
(United States) Kathy Jordan / (United States) Pam Shriver defeated (United Kingdom) Sue Barker / (United States) Sharon Walsh 7–6^{(8–6)}, 6–2

== Prize money ==
Event	W	F	SF	QF	Round of 16	Prel. round
Singles	$22,000	$11,000	$6,050	$3,000	$1,650	$900
