= 1994 Virginia Slims of Houston – Singles =

Singles
- 1994 Virginia Slims of Houston

Final
- Champion: (Germany) Sabine Hack
- Runner-up: (France) Mary Pierce
- Score: 7–5, 6–4

Details
- Draw: 28
- Seeds: 8

Events
Singles	Doubles
← 1993 ·	Virginia Slims of Houston	· 1995 →

Conchita Martínez was the defending champion but lost in the semifinals to Sabine Hack.

Hack won in the final 7–5, 6–4 against Mary Pierce.

== Seeds ==
A champion seed is indicated in bold text while text in italics indicates the round in which that seed was eliminated. The top four seeds received a bye to the second round.

1. (Spain) Conchita Martínez (semifinals)
2. (United States) Martina Navratilova (second round)
3. (Bulgaria) Magdalena Maleeva (second round)
4. (France) Mary Pierce (final)
5. (United States) Lindsay Davenport (second round)
6. (United States) Zina Garrison-Jackson (first round)
7. (Germany) **Sabine Hack (champion)**
8. (Germany) Barbara Rittner (first round)

== Draw ==
=== Key ===
- Q = Qualifier
- WC = Wild card
- LL = Lucky loser
- Alt = Alternate
- SE = Special exempt
- PR = Protected ranking
- ITF = ITF entry
- JE = Junior exempt
- w/o = Walkover
- r = Retired
- d = Defaulted
- SR = Special ranking

=== Final ===
Final
7	(Germany) **Sabine Hack**	**7**	**6**
4	(France) Mary Pierce	5	4

=== Section 1 ===
First round
(Argentina) P Tarabini	1	4
(Canada) **H Kelesi**	**6**	**6**
LL	(United States) A Keller	0	1
Q	(Spain) **Á Montolio**	**6**	**6**
(Croatia) I Majoli	2	1
5	(United States) **L Davenport**	**6**	**6**
Q	(Germany) **V Martinek**	**6**	**6**
(Belgium) D Monami	2	3
(Italy) **S Cecchini**	3	**6**	**6**
WC	(Colombia) F Zuluaga	**6**	4	3
(United States) A Grossman	4	**6**	3
7	(Germany) **S Hack**	**6**	4	**6**

Second round
1	(Spain) **C Martínez**	**6**	**6**
(Canada) H Kelesi	3	2
Q	(Spain) **Á Montolio**	**6**	**6**
5	(United States) L Davenport	3	4
3	(Bulgaria) M Maleeva	**6**	6	6
Q	(Germany) **V Martinek**	4	**7**	**7**
(Italy) S Cecchini	1	0
7	(Germany) **S Hack**	**6**	**6**

Quarterfinals
1	(Spain) **C Martínez**	**6**	**6**
Q	(Spain) Á Montolio	3	1
Q	(Germany) V Martinek	2	1
7	(Germany) **S Hack**	**6**	**6**

Semifinals
1	(Spain) C Martínez	**6**	4	4
7	(Germany) **S Hack**	2	**6**	**6**

=== Section 2 ===
First round
6	(United States) Z Garrison-Jackson	2	4
(Germany) **M Babel**	**6**	**6**
Q	(Spain) V Ruano-Pascual	5	0
(United States) **S Cacic**	**7**	**6**
(Romania) I Spîrlea	3	3
(Netherlands) **N Muns-Jagerman**	**6**	**6**
8	(Germany) B Rittner	2	4
WC	(Sweden) **Å Carlsson**	**6**	**6**
(Germany) **W Probst**	**6**	**6**
(United States) C Kuhlman	3	4
(Italy) L Golarsa	**6**	3	4
Q	(Argentina) **B Fulco-Villella**	3	**6**	**6**

Second round
(Germany) M Babel	5	**6**	2
(United States) **S Cacic**	**7**	4	**6**
(Netherlands) N Muns-Jagerman	1	4
4	(France) **M Pierce**	**6**	**6**
WC	(Sweden) **Å Carlsson**	**6**	**6**
(Germany) W Probst	4	3
Q	(Argentina) **B Fulco-Villella**	1	**6**	**6**
2	(United States) M Navratilova	**6**	4	3

Quarterfinals
(United States) S Cacic	0	1
4	(France) **M Pierce**	**6**	**6**
WC	(Sweden) **Å Carlsson**	**6**	**6**
Q	(Argentina) B Fulco-Villella	2	4

Semifinals
4	(France) **M Pierce**	**6**	**6**
WC	(Sweden) Å Carlsson	2	2
