= 1989 Virginia Slims of Houston =

- Date: April 24–30
- Edition: 19th
- Category: Category 4
- Draw: 32S / 16D
- Prize money: $250,000
- Surface: Clay / outdoor
- Location: Houston, Texas, U.S.
- Venue: Westside Tennis Club

Champions

Singles
- (Socialist Federal Republic of Yugoslavia) Monica Seles

Doubles
- (United States) Katrina Adams / (United States) Zina Garrison
- Virginia Slims of Houston

The 1989 Virginia Slims of Houston was a women's tennis tournament played on outdoor clay courts at the Westside Tennis Club in Houston, Texas in the United States that was part of the Category 4 tier of the 1989 WTA Tour. The tournament was held from April 24 through April 30, 1989. Unseeded 15-year old Monica Seles won the first career singles title, defeating Chris Evert during Evert's last season.

== Finals ==
=== Singles ===
(Socialist Federal Republic of Yugoslavia) Monica Seles defeated (United States) Chris Evert 3–6, 6–1, 6–4

- It was Seles' only title of the year and the 1st of her career.

=== Doubles ===
(United States) Katrina Adams / (United States) Zina Garrison defeated (United States) Gigi Fernández / (United States) Lori McNeil 6–3, 6–4

- It was Adams' 3rd title of the year and the 7th of her career. It was Garrison's 2nd title of the year and the 19th of her career.
