= 1971 Virginia Slims International =

- Date: August 2–8
- Edition: 2nd
- Category: WT Pro Tour
- Draw: 16S / ?D
- Prize money: $40,000
- Surface: Carpet (Sporteze) / indoor
- Location: Houston, Texas, U.S.
- Venue: Hofheinz Pavilion

Champions

Singles
- (United States) Billie Jean King

Doubles
- (United States) Rosemary Casals / (United States) Billie Jean King
← 1970 ·	Virginia Slims of Houston	· 1973 →

The 1971 Virginia Slims International was a women's tennis tournament played on indoor carpet courts at the Hofheinz Pavilion in Houston, Texas in the United States that was part of the 1971 Women's Pro Tour. It was the second edition of the tournament and was held from August 2 through August 8, 1971. First-seeded Billie Jean King won the singles title and earned $10,000 first-prize money.

== Finals ==
=== Singles ===
(United States) Billie Jean King defeated (Australia) Kerry Melville 6–4, 4–6, 6–1

=== Doubles ===
(United States) Rosemary Casals / (United States) Billie Jean King defeated (Australia) Judy Dalton / (France) Françoise Dürr 6–3, 1–6, 6–4

== Prize money ==
Event	W	F	3rd	4th	QF	Round of 16
Singles	$10,000	$5,500	$3,300	$2,800	$1,400	$700
