= 1992 Virginia Slims of Houston – Doubles =

Doubles
- 1992 Virginia Slims of Houston

Final
- Champions: (United States) Patty Fendick (United States) Gigi Fernández
- Runners-up: (Canada) Jill Hetherington (United States) Kathy Rinaldi
- Score: 7–5, 6–4

Details
- Draw: 16 (1WC/1Q)
- Seeds: 4

Events
Singles	Doubles
← 1991 ·	Virginia Slims of Houston	· 1993 →

Jill Hetherington and Kathy Rinaldi were the defending champions, but lost in the final to Patty Fendick and Gigi Fernández. The score was 7–5, 6–4.

== Seeds ==
1. (United States) Patty Fendick / (United States) Gigi Fernández (champions)
2. (United States) Katrina Adams / (United States) Zina Garrison (semifinals)
3. (United States) Sandy Collins / (United States) Lori McNeil (semifinals)
4. (Canada) Jill Hetherington / (United States) Kathy Rinaldi (final)

== Draw ==
=== Key ===
- Q = Qualifier
- WC = Wild card
- LL = Lucky loser
- Alt = Alternate
- SE = Special exempt
- PR = Protected ranking
- ITF = ITF entry
- JE = Junior exempt
- w/o = Walkover
- r = Retired
- d = Defaulted
- SR = Special ranking

=== Draw ===
First round
1	(United States) P Fendick (United States) G Fernández	6	7^{9}
(Poland) R Baranski (United States) L Glitz	1	6^{7}
WC	(United States) L Davenport (United States) C Rubin	3	2
(South Africa) L Gregory (United States) C Kuhlman	6	6
3	(United States) S Collins (United States) L McNeil	7^{7}	4	6
(United States) L Spadea (United States) T Whittington	6^{1}	6	3
(Argentina) B Fulco-Villella (Canada) R Simpson-Alter	6	2	6
(United States) A Keller (United States) J Smoller	1	6	3
(United States) Ca MacGregor (United States) P Mager	4	2
(United States) G Magers (United States) W Prausa	6	6
(United States) E Burgin (United States) ML Daniels	1	1
4	(Canada) J Hetherington (United States) K Rinaldi	6	6
(United States) L Harvey Wild (United States) S Stafford	5	3
(Italy) S Cecchini (Peru) L Gildemeister	7	6
Q	(United States) J Santrock (United States) Terri O'Reilly	3	1
2	(United States) K Adams (United States) Z Garrison	6	6

Quarterfinals
1	(United States) P Fendick (United States) G Fernández	6	6
(South Africa) L Gregory (United States) C Kuhlman	3	4
3	(United States) S Collins (United States) L McNeil	2	2
(Argentina) B Fulco-Villella (Canada) R Simpson-Alter	6	6
(United States) G Magers (United States) W Prausa	1	1
4	(Canada) J Hetherington (United States) K Rinaldi	6	6
(Italy) S Cecchini (Peru) L Gildemeister	4	3
2	(United States) K Adams (United States) Z Garrison	6	6

Semifinals
1	(United States) P Fendick (United States) G Fernández	7^{7}	2	6
(Argentina) B Fulco-Villella (Canada) R Simpson-Alter	6^{4}	6	3
4	(Canada) J Hetherington (United States) K Rinaldi	6	6^{2}	6
2	(United States) K Adams (United States) Z Garrison	4	7^{7}	0

Final
1	(United States) P Fendick (United States) G Fernández	7	6
4	(Canada) J Hetherington (United States) K Rinaldi	5	4
