= 1993 Virginia Slims of Houston – Doubles =

Doubles
- 1993 Virginia Slims of Houston

Final
- Champions: (United States) Katrina Adams; (Netherlands) Manon Bollegraf
- Runners-up: (Russia) Eugenia Maniokova; (Slovakia) Radka Zrubáková
- Score: 6–3, 5–7, 7–6^{(9–7)}

Details
- Draw: 16 (1Q/1LL)
- Seeds: 4

Events
Singles	Doubles
← 1992 ·	Virginia Slims of Houston	· 1994 →

Patty Fendick and Mary Joe Fernández were the defending champions, but none competed this year.

Katrina Adams and Manon Bollegraf won the title by defeating Eugenia Maniokova and Radka Zrubáková 6–3, 5–7, 7–6^{(9–7)} in the final.

== Seeds ==
1. (United States) Katrina Adams / (Netherlands) Manon Bollegraf (champions)
2. (Italy) Sandra Cecchini / (Argentina) Patricia Tarabini (semifinals)
3. (Germany) Karin Kschwendt / (Argentina) Florencia Labat (quarterfinals)
4. (United Kingdom) Jo Durie / (New Zealand) Julie Richardson (quarterfinals)

== Draw ==
=== Key ===
- Q = Qualifier
- WC = Wild card
- LL = Lucky loser
- Alt = Alternate
- SE = Special exempt
- PR = Protected ranking
- ITF = ITF entry
- JE = Junior exempt
- w/o = Walkover
- r = Retired
- d = Defaulted
- SR = Special ranking

=== Draw ===
First round

Quarterfinals

Semifinals

Final

1
(United States) K Adams
(Netherlands) M Bollegraf
6
7^{7}

Q
- (United States) C Benjamin
- (United States) C Kuhlman
2
6^{0}

1
(United States) K Adams
(Netherlands) M Bollegraf
6
6

(Austria) P Ritter
(Netherlands) C Vis
6
7^{7}

- (Austria) P Ritter
- (Netherlands) C Vis
1
3

- (Argentina) B Fulco Villella
- (Spain) V Ruano Pascual
1
6^{1}

1
(United States) K Adams
(Netherlands) M Bollegraf
6
6

4
(United Kingdom) J Durie
(New Zealand) J Richardson
6^{1}
6
6

- (Bulgaria) K Maleeva
- (Switzerland) M Maleeva-Fragnière
2
2

- (Sweden) M Lindström
- (Australia) L Pleming
7^{7}
3
2

4
- (United Kingdom) J Durie
- (New Zealand) J Richardson
3
0

- (United States) D Graham
- (United States) L Harvey Wild
2
6^{6}

(Bulgaria) K Maleeva
(Switzerland) M Maleeva-Fragnière
6
6

(Bulgaria) K Maleeva
(Switzerland) M Maleeva-Fragnière
6
7^{8}

1
(United States) K Adams
(Netherlands) M Bollegraf
6
5
7^{9}

(Russia) E Maniokova
(Slovakia) R Zrubáková
6
6

- (Russia) E Maniokova
- (Slovakia) R Zrubáková
3
7
6^{7}

WC
(United States) Kellie Dorman-Tyrone
(Republic of Ireland) Philippa Palmer
1
1

(Russia) E Maniokova
(Slovakia) R Zrubáková
6
2
7^{9}

- (United States) C MacGregor
- (Canada) R Simpson-Alter
3
2

3
- (Germany) K Kschwendt
- (Argentina) F Labat
4
6
6^{7}

3
(Germany) K Kschwendt
(Argentina) F Labat
6
6

(Russia) E Maniokova
(Slovakia) R Zrubáková
6
6

(Netherlands) I Driehuis
(Mexico) L Novelo
6
3
6

2
- (Italy) S Cecchini
- (Argentina) P Tarabini
4
4

- (Italy) L Ferrando
- (Italy) L Golarsa
4
6
2

- (Netherlands) I Driehuis
- (Mexico) L Novelo
3
6^{3}

- (Australia) T Morton
- (Hungary) A Temesvári
6^{5}
3

2
(Italy) S Cecchini
(Argentina) P Tarabini
6
7^{7}

2
(Italy) S Cecchini
(Argentina) P Tarabini
7^{7}
6
