= 1971 Charlotte Tennis Classic =

- Date: April 12–18
- Edition: 1st
- Category: Grand Prix (men); Non-tour (women)
- Draw: 32S / 16D
- Prize money: $25,000 (men)
- Surface: Clay / outdoor
- Location: Charlotte, North Carolina, U.S.
- Venue: Olde Providence Racquet Club

Champions

Men's singles
- (United States) Arthur Ashe

Women's singles
- (United States) Chris Evert

Men's doubles
- (United States) Marty Riessen / (Australia) Tony Roche

Women's doubles
- (United States) Chris Evert / (United States) Sue Stap
Carolinas International Tennis Tournament	· 1972 →

The 1971 Charlotte Tennis Classic, also known by its sponsored name North Carolina National Bank Open, was a combined men's and women's tennis tournament played on outdoor clay courts at the Olde Providence Racquet Club in Charlotte, North Carolina in the United States.. The men's competition was part of group C the 1971 Grand Prix circuit while the women's competition was a non-tour amateur event without prize money. It was the inaugural edition of the tournament and was held from April 12 through April 18, 1971 Arthur Ashe won the men's singles title, earning $5,000 first-prize money, and Chris Evert won the women's title.

== Finals ==
=== Men's singles ===
(United States) Arthur Ashe defeated (United States) Stan Smith 6–3, 6–3

=== Women's singles ===
(United States) Chris Evert defeated (United States) Laura duPont 6–2, 6–0

=== Men's doubles ===
(United States) Marty Riessen / (Australia) Tony Roche defeated (United States) Arthur Ashe / (United States) Dennis Ralston 6–2, 6–2

=== Women's doubles ===
(United States) Chris Evert / (United States) Sue Stap defeated (United States) Janet Newberry / (United States) Eliza Pande 6–3, 1–6, 6–3
