= 1978 Virginia Slims of Houston =

- Date: January 16–22
- Edition: 8th
- Category: Virginia Slims circuit
- Draw: 32S / 16D
- Prize money: $100,000
- Surface: Carpet (Sporteze) / indoor
- Location: Houston, Texas, US
- Venue: Astro Arena

Champions

Singles
- (United States) Martina Navratilova

Doubles
- (United States) Billie Jean King / (United States) Martina Navratilova
← 1977 ·	Virginia Slims of Houston	· 1979 →

The 1978 Virginia Slims of Houston was a women's tennis tournament played on indoor carpet courts at the Astro Arena in Houston, Texas in the United States that was part of the 1978 Virginia Slims World Championship Series. It was the eighth edition of the tournament and was held from January 16 through January 22, 1978. First-seeded Martina Navratilova won the singles title and earned $20,000 first-prize money. The doubles event was sponsored as the Bridgestone Doubles of Houston.

== Finals ==
=== Singles ===
(United States) Martina Navratilova defeated (United States) Billie Jean King 1–6, 6–2, 6–2

=== Doubles ===
(United States) Billie Jean King / (United States) Martina Navratilova defeated (United States) Mona Guerrant / (South Africa) Greer Stevens 7–6^{(5–4)}, 4–6, 7–6^{(5–4)}

== Prize money ==
Event	W	F	3rd	4th	QF	Round of 16	Round of 32
Singles	$20,000	$10,500	$6,300	$5,500	$2,800	$1,550	$850
