= 1979 Avon Championships of Houston =

- Date: January 15–22
- Edition: 9th
- Category: Virginia Slims circuit
- Draw: 32S / 16D
- Prize money: $125,000
- Surface: Carpet (Sporteze) / indoor
- Location: Houston, Texas, US
- Venue: Astro Arena

Champions

Singles
- (United States) Martina Navratilova

Doubles
- (United States) Martina Navratilova / (United States) Janet Newberry
← 1978 ·	Virginia Slims of Houston	· 1980 →

The 1979 Avon Championships of Houston was a women's tennis tournament played on indoor carpet courts at the Astro Arena in Houston, Texas in the United States that was part of the 1979 Avon Championships Circuit. It was the ninth edition of the tournament and was held from January 15 through January 22, 1979. First-seeded Martina Navratilova won the singles title and earned $24,000 first-prize money.

== Finals ==
=== Singles ===
(United States) Martina Navratilova defeated (United Kingdom) Virginia Wade 6–3, 6–2

- It was Navratilova's 2nd title of the year and the 26th of her career.

=== Doubles ===
(United States) Martina Navratilova / (United States) Janet Newberry defeated (United States) Pam Shriver / (Netherlands) Betty Stöve 4–6, 6–4, 6–2

== Prize money ==
Event	W	F	SF	QF	Round of 16	Round of 32
Singles	$24,000	$12,000	$6,000	$3,000	$1,600	$900
