= 1977 Virginia Slims of Houston =

- Date: January 17–23
- Edition: 7th
- Category: Virginia Slims circuit
- Draw: 34S / 16D
- Prize money: $100,000
- Surface: Carpet (Sporteze) / indoor
- Location: Houston, Texas, U.S.
- Venue: Astro Arena

Champions

Singles
- (United States) Martina Navratilova

Doubles
- (United States) Martina Navratilova / (Netherlands) Betty Stöve
← 1976 ·	Virginia Slims of Houston	· 1978 →

The 1977 Virginia Slims of Houston was a women's tennis tournament played on indoor carpet courts at the Astro Arena in Houston, Texas in the United States that was part of the 1977 Virginia Slims World Championship Series. It was the seventh edition of the tournament and was held from January 17 through January 23, 1977. First-seeded Martina Navratilova won the singles title and earned $20,000 first-prize money.

== Finals ==
=== Singles ===
(United States) Martina Navratilova defeated (United Kingdom) Sue Barker 7–6^{(5–3)}, 7–5

- It was Navratilova's 2nd singles title of the year and the 9th of her career.

=== Doubles ===
(United States) Martina Navratilova / (Netherlands) Betty Stöve defeated (United Kingdom) Sue Barker / (United States) Ann Kiyomura 4–6, 6–2, 6–1

== Prize money ==
Event	W	F	3rd	4th	QF	Round of 16	Round of 32	Prelim. round
Singles	$20,000	$10,000	$5,800	$5,000	$2,500	$1,375	$775	$400
