= 1989 Virginia Slims of Houston – Doubles =

Doubles
- 1989 Virginia Slims of Houston
- 1988 Champions: (United States) Katrina Adams (United States) Zina Garrison

Final
- Champions: (United States) Katrina Adams (United States) Zina Garrison
- Runners-up: (United States) Gigi Fernández (United States) Lori McNeil
- Score: 6–3, 6–4

Events
Singles	Doubles
← 1988 ·	Virginia Slims of Houston	· 1990 →

Katrina Adams and Zina Garrison were the defending champions and won in the final 6–3, 6–4 against Gigi Fernández and Lori McNeil.

== Seeds ==
Champion seeds are indicated in bold text while text in italics indicates the round in which those seeds were eliminated.

1. (United States) Gigi Fernández / (United States) Lori McNeil (final)
2. (United States) **Katrina Adams** / (United States) **Zina Garrison (champions)**
3. (United States) Penny Barg / (United States) Elise Burgin (quarterfinals)
4. (South Africa) Lise Gregory / (United States) Gretchen Magers (first round)

== Draw ==
=== Key ===
- Q = Qualifier
- WC = Wild card
- LL = Lucky loser
- Alt = Alternate
- SE = Special exempt
- PR = Protected ranking
- ITF = ITF entry
- JE = Junior exempt
- w/o = Walkover
- r = Retired
- d = Defaulted
- SR = Special ranking

First round
1	(United States) **G Fernández** (United States) **L McNeil**	**6**	**6**
(United States) E Hakami (United States) C Reynolds	2	2
(United States) P Casale (United States) S Sloane	3	3
(United States) **D Faber** (United States) **K Gompert**	**6**	**6**
4	(South Africa) L Gregory (United States) G Magers	**7**	3	3
(United States) **S Collins** (Hungary) **A Temesvári**	6	**6**	**6**
(Republic of Ireland) **L O'Halloran** (United States) **M Redfearn**	**6**	4	**6**
(United States) L Bartlett (United States) T Whittington	2	**6**	3
(Argentina) G Castro (Greece) A Kanellopoulou	**6**	3	1
(United States) **M L Daniels** (United States) **H Na**	3	**6**	**6**
(United States) L Hudson (United States) L Poruri	1	2
3	(United States) **P Barg** (United States) **E Burgin**	**6**	**6**
(United States) J Joseph (United States) P Jung	1	4
(United States) **K Foxworth** (United States) **L Spadea**	**6**	**6**
(South Africa) L Barnard (South Africa) K Schimper	**7**	1	2
2	(United States) **K Adams** (United States) **Z Garrison**	6	**6**	**6**

Quarterfinals
1	(United States) **G Fernández** (United States) **L McNeil**	**6**	2	**6**
(United States) D Faber (United States) K Gompert	3	**6**	1
(United States) **S Collins** (Hungary) **A Temesvári**	**6**	**7**
(Republic of Ireland) L O'Halloran (United States) M Redfearn	1	5
(United States) **M L Daniels** (United States) **H Na**	**6**	**6**
3	(United States) P Barg (United States) E Burgin	4	1
(United States) K Foxworth (United States) L Spadea	1	2
2	(United States) **K Adams** (United States) **Z Garrison**	**6**	**6**

Semifinals
1	(United States) **G Fernández** (United States) **L McNeil**	**6**	**7**
(United States) S Collins (Hungary) A Temesvári	3	6
(United States) M L Daniels (United States) H Na	**6**	2	6
2	(United States) **K Adams** (United States) **Z Garrison**	0	**6**	**7**

Final
1	(United States) Gigi Fernández (United States) Lori McNeil	3	4
2	(United States) **Katrina Adams** (United States) **Zina Garrison**	**6**	**6**
