= 1994 Virginia Slims of Houston =

- Date: March 21–27
- Edition: 24th
- Category: Tier II
- Draw: 28S / 16D
- Prize money: $400,000
- Surface: Clay /outdoor
- Location: Houston, Texas, U.S.
- Venue: Westside Tennis Club
- Attendance: 43,443

Champions

Singles
- (Germany) Sabine Hack

Doubles
- (Netherlands) Manon Bollegraf (United States) Martina Navratilova
← 1993 ·	Virginia Slims of Houston	· 1995 →

The 1994 Virginia Slims of Houston was a women's tennis tournament played on outdoor clay courts at the Westside Tennis Club in Houston, Texas in the United States that was part of Tier II of the 1994 WTA Tour. It was the 24th edition of the tournament and was held from March 21 through March 27, 1994. It was also the last tournament to use the name Virginia Slims in Houston. Seventh-seeded Sabine Hack won the singles title and earned $80,000 first-prize money.

== Finals ==
=== Singles ===
(Germany) Sabine Hack defeated (France) Mary Pierce 7–5, 6–4

- It was Hack's only title of the year and the 4th of her career.

=== Doubles ===
(Netherlands) Manon Bollegraf / (United States) Martina Navratilova defeated (United States) Katrina Adams / (United States) Zina Garrison-Jackson 6–4, 6–2

- It was Bollegraf's 1st title of the year and the 14th of her career. It was Navratilova's 2nd title of the year and the 337th of her career.
