= 1976 Virginia Slims of Houston =

- Date: January 12–18
- Edition: 6th
- Category: Virginia Slims circuit
- Draw: 34S / 16D
- Prize money: $75,000
- Surface: Carpet (Sporteze) / indoor
- Location: Houston, Texas, U.S.
- Venue: Astro Arena

Champions

Singles
- (United States) Martina Navratilova

Doubles
- (France) Françoise Dürr / (United States) Rosie Casals
← 1975 ·	Virginia Slims of Houston	· 1977 →

The 1976 Virginia Slims of Houston was a women's tennis tournament played on indoor carpet courts at the Astro Arena in Houston, Texas in the United States that was part of the 1976 Virginia Slims World Championship Series. It was the sixth edition of the tournament and was held from January 12 through January 18, 1976. Second-seeded Martina Navratilova won the singles title and earned $15,000 first-prize money.

== Finals ==
=== Singles ===
(United States) Martina Navratilova defeated (United States) Chris Evert 6–3, 6–4

- It was Navratilova's 1st singles title of the year and the 6th of her career.

=== Doubles ===
(France) Françoise Dürr / (United States) Rosie Casals defeated (United States) Chris Evert / (United States) Martina Navratilova 6–0, 7–5

== Prize money ==
Event	W	F	3rd	4th	QF	Round of 16	Round of 32	Prelim. round
Singles	$15,000	$8,000	$4,650	$3,900	$1,900	$1,100	$550	$375

== See also ==
- Evert–Navratilova rivalry
