= 1984 Virginia Slims of Houston =

- Date: January 30 – February 5
- Edition: 14th
- Draw: 33S / 16D
- Prize money: $150,000
- Surface: Carpet / indoor
- Location: Houston, Texas, U.S.
- Venue: Astro Arena

Champions

Singles
- (Czechoslovakia) Hana Mandlíková

Doubles
- (Socialist Federal Republic of Yugoslavia) Mima Jaušovec / (United States) Anne White
| ← 1983 · | Virginia Slims of Houston | · 1985 → |

The 1984 Virginia Slims of Houston was a women's tennis tournament played on indoor carpet courts at the Astro Arena in Houston, Texas in the United States that was part of the 1983 Virginia Slims World Championship Series (Note: The 1983 Virginia Slims World Championship Series ran from January 1983 through February 1984.). It was the 14th edition of the tournament and was held from January 30 through February 5, 1984. Third-seeded Hana Mandlíková won the singles title.

== Finals ==
=== Singles ===
(Czechoslovakia) Hana Mandlíková defeated (Bulgaria) Manuela Maleeva 6–4, 6–2

- It was Mandlíková's 3rd title of the year and the 23rd of her career.

=== Doubles ===
(Socialist Federal Republic of Yugoslavia) Mima Jaušovec / (United States) Anne White defeated (United States) Barbara Potter / (United States) Sharon Walsh 6–4, 3–6, 7–6

- It was Jaušovec's 1st title of the year and the 15th of her career. It was White's 1st career title.

== Prize money ==
| Event | W | F | SF | QF | Round of 16 | Round of 32 | Prel. round |
| Singles | $30,000 | $15,000 | $7,350 | $3,600 | $1,900 | $1,000 | $700 |
