= 1975 Virginia Slims of Houston =

- Date: March 10–15
- Edition: 5th
- Category: Virginia Slims circuit
- Draw: 32S / 12D
- Prize money: $75,000
- Surface: Carpet (Sporteze) / indoor
- Location: Houston, Texas, U.S.
- Venue: Sam Houston Coliseum

Champions

Singles
- (United States) Chris Evert

Doubles
- (France) Françoise Dürr / (Netherlands) Betty Stöve
← 1974 ·	Virginia Slims of Houston	· 1976 →

The 1975 Virginia Slims of Houston was a women's tennis tournament played on indoor carpet courts at the Sam Houston Coliseum in Houston, Texas in the United States that was part of the 1975 Virginia Slims World Championship Series. It was the fifth edition of the tournament and was held from March 10 through March 15, 1975. Second-seeded Chris Evert won the singles title and earned $15,000 first-prize money.

== Finals ==
=== Singles ===
(United States) Chris Evert defeated (Australia) Margaret Court 6–3, 6–2

- It was Evert's 3rd singles title of the year and the 42nd of her career.

=== Doubles ===
(France) Françoise Dürr / (Netherlands) Betty Stöve defeated (Australia) Evonne Goolagong / (United Kingdom) Virginia Wade 2–6, 6–3, 7–6^{(5–2)}

== Prize money ==
Event	W	F	SF	QF	Round of 16	Round of 32
Singles	$15,000	$8,500	$4,200	$2,100	$1,100	$550
