= 1973 Virginia Slims of Houston =

- Date: September 17–24
- Edition: 3rd
- Category: Virginia Slims circuit
- Draw: 32S / ?D
- Prize money: $30,000
- Surface: Carpet (Sporteze) / indoor
- Location: Houston, Texas, U.S.
- Venue: Net-Set (West Side) Racquet Club

Champions

Singles
- (France) Françoise Dürr

Doubles
- (United States) Mona Schallau / (United States) Pam Teeguarden
| ← 1971 · | Virginia Slims of Houston | · 1974 → |

The 1973 Virginia Slims of Houston was a women's tennis tournament played on indoor carpet courts at the Net-Set (West Side) Racquet Club in Houston, Texas in the United States that was part of the 1973 Virginia Slims World Championship Series. It was the third edition of the tournament and was held from September 17 through September 24, 1973. Unseeded Françoise Dürr won the singles title and earned $7,000 first-prize money. The final was delayed by one day due to rain.

Just before the start of the tournament three of the four top-seeded players (Margaret Court, Evonne Goolagong and Chris Evert) pulled out and Billie Jean King became the new top-seeded player. King also played the "Battle of the Sexes" match against Bobby Riggs during the week of the tournament.

== Finals ==
=== Singles ===
(France) Françoise Dürr defeated (United States) Rosemary Casals 6–4, 1–6, 6–4

=== Doubles ===
(United States) Mona Schallau / (United States) Pam Teeguarden defeated (France) Françoise Dürr / (Netherlands) Betty Stöve 6–3, 5–7, 6–4

== Prize money ==
| Event | W | F | 3rd (Note: The match for third place between Nancy Gunter and Billie Jean King was not finished due to rain. The prize money was shared equally.) | 4th | QF | Round of 16 | Round of 32 |
| Singles | $7,000 | $3,500 | $1,800 | $1,800 | $900 | $450 | $225 |
