= 1974 Virginia Slims of Houston =

- Date: September 30 – October 6
- Edition: 4th
- Category: Virginia Slims circuit
- Draw: 32S / 12D
- Prize money: $50,000
- Surface: Carpet (Sporteze) / indoor
- Location: Houston, Texas, U.S.
- Venue: Net-Set (West Side) Racquet Club

Champions

Singles
- (United States) Chris Evert

Doubles
- (United States) Janet Newberry / (United States) Wendy Overton
← 1973 ·	Virginia Slims of Houston	· 1975 →

The 1974 Virginia Slims of Houston was a women's tennis tournament played on indoor carpet courts at the Net-Set (West Side) Racquet Club in Houston, Texas in the United States that was part of the 1974 Virginia Slims World Championship Series. It was the fourth edition of the tournament and was held from September 30 through October 6, 1974. First-seeded Chris Evert won the singles title and earned $10,000 first-prize money.

== Finals ==
=== Singles ===
(United States) Chris Evert defeated (United Kingdom) Virginia Wade 6–3, 5–7, 6–1

- It was Evert's 14th singles title of the year and the 37th of her career.

=== Doubles ===
(United States) Janet Newberry / (United States) Wendy Overton defeated (United States) Sue Stap / (United Kingdom) Virginia Wade 4–6, 7–5, 6–2

== Prize money ==
Event	W	F	SF	QF	Round of 16	Round of 32
Singles	$10,000	$5,600	$2,800	$1,400	$700	$350
