= Sue Stap =

American tennis player

- Full name: Susan Stap Kust
- Country (sports): United States
- Born: June 3, 1954 (age 71) Phoenixville, Pennsylvania, United States

Singles
- Highest ranking: No. 34

Grand Slam singles results
- Wimbledon: 3R (1972)
- US Open: 2R (1970, 1972)

Doubles

Grand Slam doubles results
- French Open: 1R (1973)
- Wimbledon: 1R (1972, 1973)
- US Open: 2R (1975, 1977)

Grand Slam mixed doubles results
- US Open: QF (1974, 1975)

Susan Stap Kust (born June 3, 1954) is an American former professional tennis player.

A native of Deerfield, Illinois, Stap was ranked as high as 34 in the world while competing on the professional tour during the 1970s. She and her sister Sandy were coached by their father, Jake Stap, who in his youth was a good enough baseball pitcher to be signed by the Chicago White Sox and is credited with inventing the tennis ball hopper.

Stap made the singles third round at the 1972 Wimbledon Championships and was a two-time US Open quarter-finalist in mixed doubles. She won the 1971 Charlotte Tennis Classic doubles title with Chris Evert and was doubles runner-up with Virginia Wade at the 1974 Virginia Slims of Houston. Her career also included a win over Martina Navratilova and an appearance in the end of season Virginia Slims Championships in 1975.

== WTA Tour finals ==
=== Doubles (0–1) ===
Result	W–L	Date	Tournament	Surface	Partner	Opponents	Score
Loss	0–1	Oct 1974	Houston, U.S.	Carpet	(United Kingdom) Virginia Wade	(United States) Janet Newberry (United States) Wendy Overton	6–4, 5–7, 2–6
