= 1970 Houston Women's Invitation =

1970 women's only tennis tournament

- Date: September 23–26
- Edition: 1st
- Draw: 8S
- Prize money: $7,500
- Surface: Clay (Green) / outdoor
- Location: Houston, Texas, U.S.
- Venue: Houston Racquet Club

Champions
- (United States) Rosie Casals
- Houston Women's Invitation

The 1970 Houston Women's Invitation (also known as the Virginia Slims Invitation for sponsorship reasons) was a women's only tennis tournament. The tournament was the first women only tournament and was created by Gladys Heldman and held at the Houston Racquet Club.

The tournament was held in protest to the unfair distribution of prize money at tennis events. The women objected to the Pacific Southwest Championships offering a 8:1 ratio split in prize money. Nine women, known as "the original 9", including Billie Jean King, went with Heldman to play in this one-off tournament.

The Houston Women's invitation received sponsorship from Virginia Slims (Philip Morris), making the total prize purse $7,500 and took place at the same time as the Pacific Southwest Championships. The tournament was won by Rosie Casals when she beat Judy Dalton of Australia in the final.

== Background ==
"Outspoken on behalf of women's rights, in and out of sports–tennis in particular—she was possibly the most influential figure in popularizing professional tennis in the United States."

— Collins on King

Until the Houston event, all women's tournaments were held alongside men's tennis events. These events were part of the Grand Prix series for women, but unlike the men's series, without a season-ending championship. The Open era began with the British Hard Court Championships in Bournemouth in 1968. At the first Open Wimbledon, the prize-fund difference was 2.5:1 in favour of men. Billie Jean King won £750 for taking the title, while Rod Laver took £2,000. The total purses of the competitions were £14,800 for men and £5,680 for women. By the 1970s, the pay which had been 2.5:1 ratio between men and women increased. In 1969, ratios of 5:1 in terms of pay were common at smaller tournaments; by 1970, these figures increased to 8:1 and even 12:1. At the 1970 Italian Open, men's champion Ilie Nastase received $3,500 and women's champion Billie Jean King received $600.

"Gladys and her magazine became the allies of disgruntled female players."

— Collins on Heldman and World Tennis magazine.

Gladys Heldman, who was a former player in the amateur era, had been making her mark in American tennis throughout the 1950s and 60s. When the United States Lawn Tennis Association (USLTA) voted not to hold the National Indoor Championships because they always lost money, Heldman stepped in to underwrite the losses, and turned in an $8,000 profit. In 1962, she raised $18,000 to charter a plane to take 85 foreign tennis players to New York to play in the US Open and underwrote their expenses as well. Heldman's involvement in tennis went back ten years, to 1953, when she set up World Tennis magazine. It made a loss at first, but by the mid-1960s it sold 43,000 copies, making the highest-selling tennis magazine in the world. Heldman used her magazine to increase awareness of gender inequality in sports. In winter 1969, Heldman staged three women's only tournaments: a $5,000 tournament in Philadelphia; another $5,000 tournament at the Vanderbilt Club in New York; and a tournament without prize money in Dallas.

"If they don't like it. I won't give them any prize money."

— Jack Kramer in response to Heldman

The turning point in the struggle for acceptance of the women's game came before the US Open in 1970. The Pacific Southwest Championships, run by Jack Kramer, offered a total prize purse of $12,500 to the men players and only $1,500 to the women players, for a ratio worse than 8:1, a pay difference tennis journalist Bud Collins termed a "feudalistic ratio." Because the tournament would not take place until after the Open, players contacted Heldman and stated that they wanted to boycott the event. Heldman advised against the idea and she approached Kramer twice without success. Heldman decided that if women were not going to be paid fairly, then she would set up a tournament to rival Kramer's. Houston was chosen as the venue as Heldman was about to move there. She contacted the Houston Racquet Club and the Texas Lawn Tennis Association about her idea and within days had created a $5,000 tournament for eight women.

In the locker rooms at Forest Hills, the women tennis professionals argued about whether to boycott the Pacific Southwest Championship. The idealists in the group wanted to make a point before 12:1 ratios were the norm. Others wanted no part in a rebellion. When it looked as if the group would get nowhere, Heldman walked into the locker room and announced her plan for the Houston Women's Invitation.

== Opposition ==
When Heldman first told Kramer of her tournament, he stated that he would not oppose the tournament. Once Kramer spoke with his friends at the USLTA, he changed his mind and decided that he would object to the tournament taking place; the women needed the governing body's backing to be allowed to proceed. The USLTA, according to King, tried to pin the blame on Perry T. Jones, the president of Southern California Tennis Association, who at the time was in a coma. The USLTA sent a telegram to Heldman allegedly signed by him. Jones died the next day.

== Sanctions ==
The Original 9 each hold up a dollar bill to signify the $1 contracts they signed with Gladys Heldman to become contract pros, separating them from the USLTA and the ITLA tennis-governing organizations.

Two days before the tournament, Alaster Martin, president of the USLTA, sent an ultimatum to the players planning to take part in the tournament. His message stated that the USLTA would suspend any player involved, meaning they could not play in Wightman or Federation Cup competition. Their future at the Grand Slams also would be in doubt.

"At that point I didn't care if I never played Wimbledon again.""

— Nancy Richey looking back on the incident.

Before the tournament started, Stan Malless, chairman of the USLTA's scheduling committee, called the group planning to play in the tournament. Malless stated that they could have a sanctioned amateur tournament with no prize money. If they chose this option, they could play for $7,500 in "money under the table." If they played for the money honestly, they would be suspended. The women chose the latter. They signed one-week contracts with Heldman to protect the racquet club from sanctions. With the start of the tournament an hour away and the contracts not signed, King phoned Martin to give him one last chance. Martin offered no money deal and could only offer two tournaments for women: the US Indoor Championships and the US Open. King put the phone down walked away, and with the other eight women signed Heldman's contract on September 23, 1970. The players marked the moment by taking a photo of each of them holding up a dollar bill symbolic of the $1 contracts they had signed. The photo was widely circulated in the press and has long since represented the birth of modern women's professional tennis as a whole and more specifically the first women's professional tour. The USLTA suspended the players on September 25, two days later.

== Players ==
"BJ and Rosie were the ringleaders on court, close friends, doubles partners frequent final–round foes, super saleswomen for the emerging tour. They were perfect role players, feisty but good humored kids off the public courts who believed women had a destiny in professional sport."

— Bud Collins
- Peaches Bartkowicz: Winner of the Girls under-18 national title three times in a row, equalling Sarah Palfrey's record. Bartkowicz had won Junior Wimbledon and had won medals at the 1968 Olympic Games exhibitions.
- Rosie Casals: The reigning Wimbledon Doubles and Mixed Doubles Champions in 1970. She had finished as the runner up in the Australian and French Opens in the doubles, and in the mixed doubles at the US Open. Also, Casals won the US Open doubles title, and in 1970 reached the final of the singles competition. Casals states "I got $3,750 when I lost the 1970 US Open final to Court, the last victim in her Grand Slam." When Casals was 18, Harry Hopman labeled her the best junior prospect in the world. She stated 40 years later, "Jeopardizing the chance to play Grand Slams was probably the riskiest part of going against the old establishment. What else were we risking? We were really second class citizens when we played at the sanctioned tournaments alongside the men, and that meant all tournaments. In that sense we didn't have a lot to lose. On the other hand, the Grand Slams were everything to us at that time."
- Judy Dalton: Had just completed a career Grand Slam in Women's doubles as she had won the US Open, the only title missing from her collection at that point. Dalton was part of Australia's winning Federation Cup team in 1970. "Before there was a Tour, I actually worked as an accountant when I wasn't playing tennis. In those days, the Lawn Tennis Association of Australia wouldn't let any of us—men or women—play more than six months of the year. These days that would be called restraint of trade!" On the money Dalton said, "I know exactly what I did with my prize money from Houston. My husband, David, and I had just bought a house in Melbourne, and I sent most of it home to help pay it off." With regard to the personal sanctions against her, she said, "I couldn't play with my Slazenger racquet, we couldn't play in tournaments. In fairness, Wilson was fantastic—they gave us all the stuff that we wanted and did what they could to help. From memory, I used Wilson racquets for two years."
- Julie Heldman: The daughter of the leader Gladys. Heldman was a three-time Canadian Junior Champion and a US junior champion. Heldman was a runner-up at one of the Olympic exhibitions to Bartkowicz. Heldman had won the prestigious Canadian and Italian Opens in the 1960s. Heldman in 1970 had her best run at a Grand Slam to date as she reached the semifinals of the French Open. Heldman, however, was injured and therefore did not participate in the competition. "That's my abiding memory of that time: the sense of solidarity and a step forward. I couldn't play because I had an elbow injury. My parents had just moved from New York to Houston, and I was in the new house manning the phones the night before the tournament was due to start. The women were calling and saying the USTA was threatening to suspend everybody. The morning the tournament was due to start, I didn't go to the site because I wasn't playing. But when I heard everyone had stood in solidarity I decided I would do the same, even if it meant being suspended too."

"We knew we were making history and we had such a strong sense of purpose. I just kept thinking about the vision we had for the future of our sport. We wanted to ensure that any girl in the world that was good enough would have a place to go and make a living playing tennis."

— Billie Jean King speaking in 2010.
- Billie Jean King: Former Australian and US Open champion and three time Wimbledon champion. King was also the reigning Wimbledon doubles champion and the reigning French Open mixed doubles champion. At this stage in her career, King already had a career Grand Slam in mixed doubles and only needed the French Open to repeat the feat in singles play. King was considered the ring leader amongst the players.
- Kerry Melville: At just 23, had just broken into the world's top ten when she joined King and Heldman. In 1970, she also managed to reach the final of her home Slam, her first final, but lost to Margaret Court. Forty years later she stated, "Houston felt like the start of something, and I remember being excited. I was just a little ol' Aussie... I wanted a better deal, of course, but I wouldn't put myself in the feminist category. I went a lot by what Judy (Dalton) did; it was good having her around. I think my parents were a little concerned, but I felt that with Billie Jean we had a strong leader."
- Kristy Pigeon: Winner of Junior US Open and Junior Wimbledon titles in her career. Pigeon reached the fourth round at Wimbledon in 1968 and 1969. She was 20 years old when she took a stand against the establishment. She later stated, "I think a lot of those original true feminists were missing the point by burning bras. In a way, they didn't make nearly as many waves as we tennis players did. We demonstrated that as sportspeople we were as interesting as the men. Our competition was stimulating to watch and we could pull the people in. For me, that's a more powerful way of establishing equality."
- Nancy Richey: Two time singles Grand Slam champion and multiple doubles champ; she was 28 in 1970. Richey said 40 years later of the events, "I still feel the same way as I did then about the inequities. It was so unfair, we were so discriminated against. Some of the men players were upset that we were getting any of the prize money at the tournaments that were being held jointly. If the purse was $10,000, they were getting $8,500. It was that kind of ratio. And they were pretty vocal about it. They'd say, 'Well go out and get your own circuit and stop taking the money from us."
- Valerie Ziegenfuss: Reached the fourth round of the US Open in 1969 and the third round at Wimbledon in 1970. She won $300 for her loss to Casels.

Two other players withdrew from the event: Patti Hogan withdrew because she did not want to take the risk and stand against the establishment. Margaret Court, who, after completing her Grand Slam, had just lost in Charlotte to Chris Evert, who was 15 at the time, withdrew due to a left ankle injury which sidelined her for three months. She was replaced by Pigeon.

== Tournament ==
"He came to the financial and spiritual rescue of the women, up to then second–class citizens of tournament tennis."

— Bud Collins on Cullman

Joseph Cullman added an additional $2,500 making the purse stand at $7,500. Cullman was the chairman of Philip Morris and a family friend of Gladys Heldman. Philip Morris had already sponsored the 1968 U.S. Open. Cullman agreed to sponsor the Houston tournament using the Virginia Slims brand the company had introduced two years earlier. The tournament was therefore called the Virginia Slims Invitational.

Quarterfinals
1	(United States) Rosie Casals	6	7
(United States) Valerie Ziegenfuss	1	5
(Australia) Kerry Melville	6	6
(United States) Kristy Pigeon	3	4
(United States) Billie Jean King	3	3
(Australia) Judy Dalton	6	6
(United States) Peaches Bartkowicz	3	3
2	(United States) Nancy Richey	6	6

Semifinals
1	(United States) Rosie Casals	4	7	6
(Australia) Kerry Melville	6	5	3
(Australia) Judy Dalton	4	7	6
2	(United States) Nancy Richey	6	5	2

Final
1	(United States) Rosie Casals	5	6	7
(Australia) Judy Dalton	7	1	5
Third Place Playoff
(Australia) Kerry Melville	6	6
2	(United States) Nancy Richey	1	2

== Aftermath ==
During the tournament, Barry MacKay, chairman of the Pacific Coast Championships, called Heldman with an offer. Following all the publicity surrounding her event MacKay had decided to increase the women's prize fund for a draw of 32 players from $2,000 to $4,400. Heldman declined and stated that her players would play for a purse of $11,000. MacKay called the next day and agreed to the demands.

After the event at a dinner at Heldman's house, Larry King and Dennis Van der Meer proposed that their company, TennisAmerica should be brought in to run the women's tour. The players voted between King and Heldman and chose Heldman to run a new women's only tour. This became the Virginia Slims Circuit, with Phillip Morris continuing their link and sponsoring 8 of the 16 tournaments on the schedule.

In 2015, a tennis.com article stated, "The tour would be criticized over the years for promoting cigarettes, but Cullman was the right sponsor for the moment."

On February 13, 1971, as the women's professional tour continued, the USLTA grudgingly relented and, for the first time, issued rankings that included contract professionals as well as amateurs, with King, Casals and Richey ranked first, second and third among women, and Mary-Ann Eisel Curtis, No. 1 ranked since October after the expulsion of the contract pros, dropping to fourth place. The ILTA initially suspended the players as well, but soon relented when they realised that they needed them for their events to bring in spectators.
