= 1987 Virginia Slims of Houston =

- Date: April 20–26
- Edition: 17th
- Category: Category 3
- Draw: 32S / 16D
- Prize money: $150,000
- Surface: Clay / outdoor
- Location: Houston, TX, U.S.
- Venue: Westside Tennis Club

Champions

Singles
- (United States) Chris Evert

Doubles
- (United States) Kathy Jordan / (United States) Martina Navratilova
← 1986 ·	Virginia Slims of Houston	· 1988 →

The 1987 Virginia Slims of Houston was a women's tennis tournament played on outdoor clay courts at the Westside Tennis Club in Houston, Texas in the United States and was part of the Category 3 tier of the 1987 WTA Tour. It was the 17th edition of the tournament and was held from April 20 through April 26, 1987. Third-seeded Chris Evert won the singles title and earned $30,000 first-prize money.

== Finals ==
=== Singles ===
(United States) Chris Evert defeated (United States) Martina Navratilova 3–6, 6–1, 7–6^{(7–4)}

- It was Evert's 2nd singles title of the year and the 150th of her career.

=== Doubles ===
(United States) Kathy Jordan / (United States) Martina Navratilova defeated (United States) Zina Garrison / (United States) Lori McNeil 6–2, 6–4

== See also ==
- Evert–Navratilova rivalry
