= 1990 Virginia Slims of Houston =

- Date: March 27 – April 1
- Edition: 20th
- Category: Tier III
- Draw: 16S / 8D
- Prize money: $225,000
- Surface: Clay / outdoor
- Location: Houston, Texas, U.S.
- Venue: Westside Tennis Club

Champions

Singles
- (Bulgaria) Katerina Maleeva

Doubles
- cancelled due to rain delays
- Virginia Slims of Houston

The 1990 Virginia Slims of Houston was a women's tennis tournament played on outdoor clay courts at the Westside Tennis Club in Houston, Texas in the United States that was part of the Tier III category of the 1990 WTA Tour. It was the 20th edition of the tournament and was held from March 27 through April 1, 1990. Fourth-seeded Katerina Maleeva won the singles title and earned won $45,000 first-prize money.

== Finals ==
=== Singles ===
(Bulgaria) Katerina Maleeva defeated (Spain) Arantxa Sánchez Vicario 6–1, 1–6, 6–4

- It was Maleeva' first singles title of the year and the 9th of her career.

=== Doubles ===
The doubles event was cancelled due to rain delays.
