= 1985 Virginia Slims of Houston =

- Date: April 28 – May 5
- Edition: 15th
- Category: 3
- Draw: 28S / 16D
- Prize money: $150,000
- Surface: Clay / outndoor
- Location: Houston, Texas, U.S.

Champions

Singles
- (United States) Martina Navratilova

Doubles
- (United States) Elise Burgin / (United States) Anne White
- Virginia Slims of Houston

The 1985 Virginia Slims of Houston was a women's tennis tournament played on outdoor clay courts in Sugar Land, Houston, Texas in the United States that was part of the Category 3 tier of the 1985 Virginia Slims World Championship Series. It was the 15th edition of the tournament and was held from April 28 through May 5, 1985. First-seeded Martina Navratilova won the singles title.

== Finals ==
=== Singles ===
(United States) Martina Navratilova defeated (United States) Elise Burgin 6–4, 6–1

- It was Navratilova's 6th singles title of the year and the 105th of her career.

=== Doubles ===
(United States) Elise Burgin / (United States) Martina Navratilova defeated (Bulgaria) Manuela Maleeva / (Czechoslovakia) Helena Suková 6–1, 3–6, 6–3
