= Club Westside =

Private tennis club in Houston, Texas

Coordinates: 29.750122°N 95.574832°W

- Interactive map of Club Westside
- Location: Houston, Texas, United States
- Owner: City of Houston
- Capacity: 5,240 (tennis)
- Surface: Hard

Tenants
- U.S. Men's Championships (tennis) (2001-2007); ATP World Tour Finals (tennis) (2003, 2004)

Club Westside is a private tennis club in Houston, Texas. It was the former home (2001–2007) to the ATP Tour U.S. Men's Clay Court Championships. Its 5,240-seat Gallery Furniture Stadium was the home of the Houston Wranglers of World TeamTennis. The stadium also hosted the Tennis Masters Cup in 2003 and 2004.

The club long offered courts of all the Grand Slam surfaces: Rebound Ace (Australian Open), red clay (French Open), grass (Wimbledon), and DecoTurf (US Open). The clay courts were the only courts in the United States that were identical to those at Roland Garros. The grass courts were designed and installed under the supervision of David Kimpton of the Queen's Club. There were 46 courts in total, including 10 indoors.

In December 2006, the club management decided to become an all-around sports and family club. It converted its red clay into swimming pools and more hard courts and added a waterpark. The current facilities include 22 outdoor hard courts and four indoor hard courts.

== See also ==
- Houston Wranglers
- U.S. Men's Clay Court Championships
- List of tennis stadiums by capacity

Preceded by SNIEC; Shanghai	ATP Year-end Championships; Venue; 2003, 2004	Succeeded by Qizhong Forest Sports City Arena; Shanghai
