= Virginia Slims of Houston =

Defunct tennis tournament
- Event name: Houston Women's Invitation (1970); Virginia Slims International (1971); Virginia Slims of Houston (1973–78, 1983–94); Avon Championships of Houston (1979–82); Gallery Furniture Championships (1995)
- Tour: WTA Tour (1970–95)
- Founded: 1970
- Abolished: 1995
- Surface: Carpet (1970–84); Clay (1985–95)

The Virginia Slims of Houston is a defunct WTA Tour affiliated tennis tournament played from 1970 to 1995. It was held in Houston, Texas in the United States and played on indoor carpet courts from 1970 to 1984 and on outdoor clay courts from 1985 to 1995.

The event has the distinction of being the first-ever tournament on the professional women's circuit, which would eventually become the WTA Tour. In 1971, the event served as the series Championships of the inaugural Virginia Slims Tour.

Martina Navratilova was the most successful player at the tournament, winning the singles and doubles competitions six times each, partnering Dutchwomen Betty Stöve and Manon Bollegraf and Americans Janet Newberry, Pam Shriver, Elise Burgin and Kathy Jordan once each for her doubles successes.

== Finals ==
=== Singles ===
Year	Champions	Runners-up	Score
1970	(United States) Rosemary Casals	(Australia) Judy Dalton	5–7, 6–1, 7–5
1971	(United States) Billie Jean King	(Australia) Kerry Melville	6–4, 4–6, 6–1
1972	Not Held		
1973	(France) Françoise Dürr	(United States) Rosemary Casals	6–4, 1–6, 6–4
1974	(United States) Chris Evert	(United Kingdom) Virginia Wade	6–3, 5–7, 6–1
1975	(United States) Chris Evert	(Australia) Margaret Court	6–3, 6–2
1976	(United States) Martina Navratilova	(United States) Chris Evert	6–3, 6–4
1977	(United States) Martina Navratilova	(United Kingdom) Sue Barker	7–6^{(5–3)}, 7–5
1978	(United States) Martina Navratilova	(United States) Billie Jean King	1–6, 6–2, 6–2
1979	(United States) Martina Navratilova	(United Kingdom) Virginia Wade	6–3, 6–2
1980	(United States) Billie Jean King	(United States) Martina Navratilova	6–1, 6–3
1981	(Czechoslovakia) Hana Mandlíková	(West Germany) Bettina Bunge	6–4, 6–4
1982	(West Germany) Bettina Bunge	(United States) Pam Shriver	6–2, 3–6, 6–2
1983	(United States) Martina Navratilova	(West Germany) Sylvia Hanika	6–3, 7–6
1984	(Czechoslovakia) Hana Mandlíková	(Bulgaria) Manuela Maleeva	6–4, 6–2
1985	(United States) Martina Navratilova	(United States) Elise Burgin	6–4, 6–1
1986	(United States) Chris Evert-Lloyd	(United States) Kathy Rinaldi	6–4, 2–6, 6–4
1987	(United States) Chris Evert	(United States) Martina Navratilova	3–6, 6–1, 7–6
1988	(United States) Chris Evert	(United States) Martina Navratilova	6–0, 6–4
1989	(Socialist Federal Republic of Yugoslavia) Monica Seles	(United States) Chris Evert	3–6, 6–1, 6–4
1990	(Bulgaria) Katerina Maleeva	(Spain) Arantxa Sánchez Vicario	6–1, 1–6, 6–4
1991	(Socialist Federal Republic of Yugoslavia) Monica Seles	(United States) Mary Joe Fernández	6–4, 6–3
1992	(Socialist Federal Republic of Yugoslavia) Monica Seles	(United States) Zina Garrison	6–1, 6–1
1993	(Spain) Conchita Martínez	(Germany) Sabine Hack	6–3, 6–2
1994	(Germany) Sabine Hack	(France) Mary Pierce	7–5, 6–4
1995	(Germany) Steffi Graf	(Sweden) Åsa Carlsson	6–1, 6–1

=== Doubles ===
Year	Champions	Runners-up	Score
1970	Not Held		
1971	(United States) Rosemary Casals (United States) Billie Jean King	(Australia) Judy Dalton (France) Françoise Dürr	6–3, 1–6, 6–4
1972	Not Held		
1973	(United States) Mona Schallau (United States) Pam Teeguarden	(France) Françoise Dürr (Netherlands) Betty Stöve	6–3, 5–7, 6–4
1974	(United States) Janet Newberry (United States) Wendy Overton	(United States) Sue Stap (United Kingdom) Virginia Wade	4–6, 7–5, 6–2
1975	(France) Françoise Dürr (Netherlands) Betty Stöve	(Australia) Evonne Goolagong (United Kingdom) Virginia Wade	2–6, 6–3, 7–6
1976	(France) Françoise Dürr (United States) Rosemary Casals	(United States) Chris Evert (United States) Martina Navratilova	6–0, 7–5
1977	(United States) Martina Navratilova (Netherlands) Betty Stöve	(United Kingdom) Sue Barker (United States) Ann Kiyomura	4–6, 6–2, 6–1
1978	(United States) Billie Jean King (United States) Martina Navratilova	(South Africa) Greer Stevens (United States) Mona Guerrant	7–6^{(5–4)}, 4–6, 7–6^{(5–4)}
1979	(United States) Martina Navratilova (United States) Janet Newberry	(United States) Pam Shriver (Netherlands) Betty Stöve	4–6, 6–4, 6–2
1980	(United States) Billie Jean King (South Africa) Ilana Kloss	(Netherlands) Betty Stöve (Australia) Wendy Turnbull	3–6, 6–1, 6–4
1981	(United Kingdom) Sue Barker (United States) Ann Kiyomura	(Czechoslovakia) Regina Maršíková (United States) Mary Lou Piatek	5–7, 6–4, 6–3
1982	(United States) Kathy Jordan (United States) Pam Shriver	(United Kingdom) Sue Barker (United States) Sharon Walsh	7–6, 6–2
1983	(United States) Martina Navratilova (United States) Pam Shriver	(United Kingdom) Jo Durie (United States) Barbara Potter	6–4, 6–3
1984	(Socialist Federal Republic of Yugoslavia) Mima Jaušovec (United States) Anne White	(United States) Barbara Potter (United States) Sharon Walsh	6–4, 3–6, 7–6
1985	(United States) Elise Burgin (United States) Martina Navratilova	(Bulgaria) Manuela Maleeva (Czechoslovakia) Helena Suková	6–1, 3–6, 6–3
1986	(United States) Chris Evert-Lloyd (Australia) Wendy Turnbull	(United States) Elise Burgin (United States) JoAnne Russell	6–2, 6–4
1987	(United States) Kathy Jordan (United States) Martina Navratilova	(United States) Zina Garrison (United States) Lori McNeil	6–2, 6–4
1988	(United States) Katrina Adams (United States) Zina Garrison	(United States) Lori McNeil (United States) Martina Navratilova	6–7, 6–2, 6–4
1989	(United States) Katrina Adams (United States) Zina Garrison	(United States) Gigi Fernández (United States) Lori McNeil	6–3, 6–4
1990	Not Completed		
1991	(Canada) Jill Hetherington (United States) Kathy Rinaldi	(United States) Patty Fendick (United States) Mary Joe Fernández	6–1, 2–6, 6–1
1992	(United States) Patty Fendick (United States) Gigi Fernández	(Canada) Jill Hetherington (United States) Kathy Rinaldi	7–5, 6–4
1993	(United States) Katrina Adams (Netherlands) Manon Bollegraf	(Russia) Eugenia Maniokova (Slovakia) Radka Zrubáková	6–3, 5–7, 7–6^{(9–7)}
1994	(Netherlands) Manon Bollegraf (United States) Martina Navratilova	(United States) Katrina Adams (United States) Zina Garrison	6–4, 6–2
1995	(United States) Nicole Arendt (Netherlands) Manon Bollegraf	(Germany) Wiltrud Probst (Canada) Rene Simpson	6–4, 6–2
