= Austin Stowell =

American actor (born 1984)

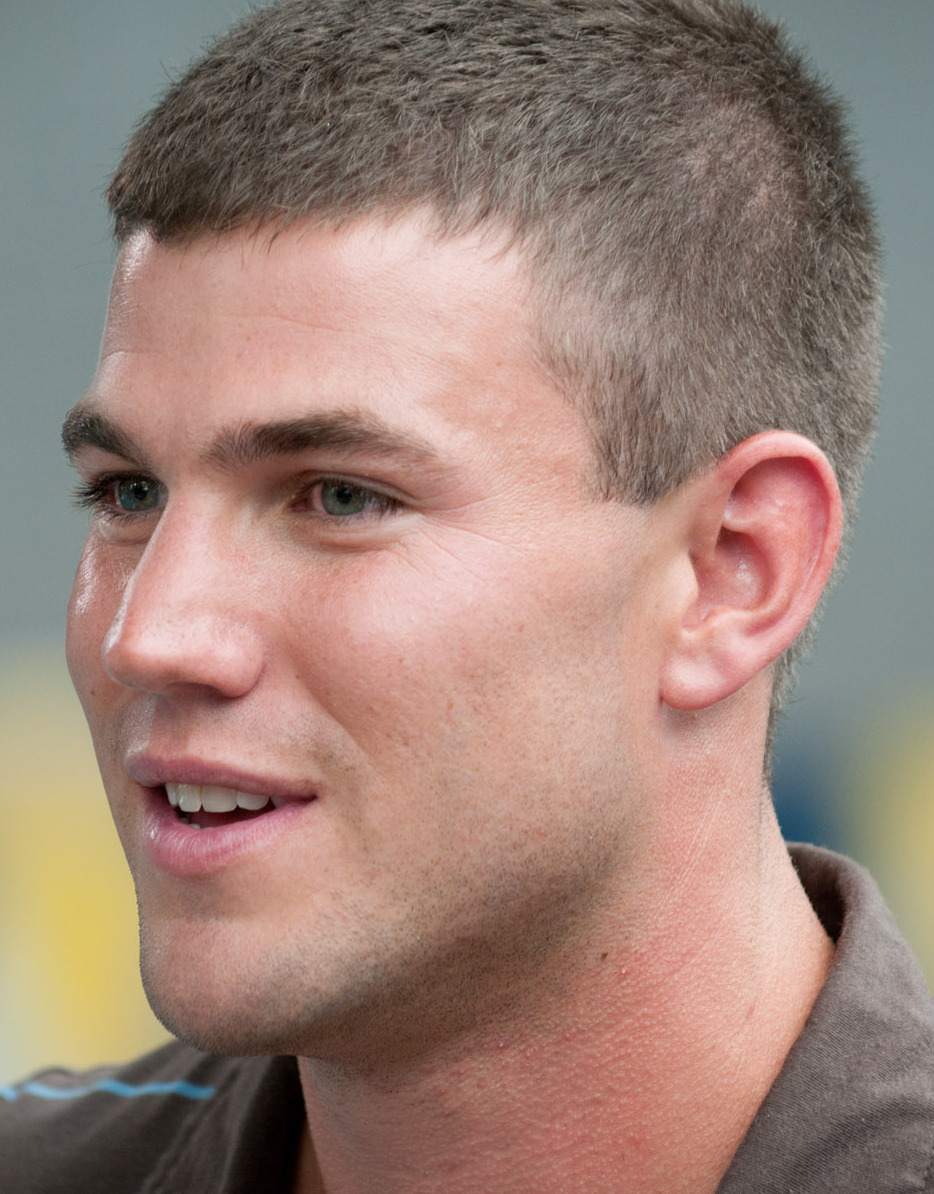
- Stowell in 2010
- Born: December 24, 1984 (age 41); Kensington, Connecticut, U.S.
- Alma mater: University of Connecticut
- Occupations: Actor, producer
- Years active: 2008–present

Austin Miles Stowell (born December 24, 1984) is an American actor. He is known for his roles in Dolphin Tale (2011), its sequel Dolphin Tale 2 (2014), Love and Honor (2013), as Ryan Connolly in Whiplash (2014), as Francis Gary Powers in Steven Spielberg's Bridge of Spies (2015), as Nately in Catch-22 (2019), The Hating Game (2021), and as young Special Agent Leroy Jethro Gibbs in the prequel series NCIS: Origins (2024–present).

== Early life ==
Stowell was born as the youngest of three sons, in Kensington, Connecticut. There, he was raised by his father, Robert, a retired steelworker, and his mother, Elizabeth, a schoolteacher.

He graduated from Berlin High School in 2003, to pursue a professional career in acting. Upon acceptance at the University of Connecticut in Storrs, he studied with the Department of Dramatic Arts, a division of the School of Fine Arts. He performed in several productions with the Connecticut Repertory Theatre, including Julius Caesar, It Can't Happen Here, and As You Like It and won the prestigious Nafe Katter Award for best performer his senior year. He graduated with a Bachelor of Fine Arts in 2007 Upon graduating, he relocated to Los Angeles to pursue acting professionally.

== Career ==
Stowell made his television debut in 2009 playing Jesse on ABC Family's The Secret Life of the American Teenager, which ended up turning into a recurring guest role. Later, he appeared as Chad in an episode of the Comedy Central sitcom Secret Girlfriend.

The next year, Stowell appeared in episodes of 90210 and NCIS: Los Angeles, before making his feature film debut in 2011 as an ER medic in the drama Puncture starring Chris Evans. Also that year, he starred alongside Harry Connick Jr. and Nathan Gamble in Dolphin Tale, a story centered on the friendship between a boy and a dolphin whose tail was lost in a crab trap, as Kyle Connellan.

In 2013, Stowell starred as Dalton Joiner alongside Liam Hemsworth in the historical romantic drama Love and Honor, which also starred Teresa Palmer and Aimeé Teegarden. He also made an appearance as a backstage flirt in the biographical drama Behind the Candelabra starring Michael Douglas and Matt Damon. He was also in the Hallmark movie A Way Back Home.

In 2014, he began with being a part of the ensemble cast for the critically acclaimed drama Whiplash, where he portrayed the role of Ryan. The film follows a promising young drummer enrolling at a cut-throat music conservatory where his dreams of greatness are mentored by an instructor who will stop at nothing to realize a student's potential. Later in the year, he appeared in Warren as Ted Gordon and Behaving Badly as Kevin Carpenter, before returning to his character Kyle Connellan in Dolphin Tale 2.

In 2015, Stowell starred alongside Edward Burns in the series Public Morals playing the role of Sean O'Bannon. The series follows the New York City Public Morals Division in the 1960s, where cops walk the line between morality and criminality as the temptations that come from dealing with all kinds of vice can get the better of them. In November, Stowell portrayed Francis Gary Powers in the Steven Spielberg historical drama Bridge of Spies, which starred Tom Hanks. In 2016, he played Eddie in In Dubious Battle alongside James Franco and Vincent D'Onofrio, followed by Joel in Colossal with Anne Hathaway and Jason Sudeikis.

In 2017, Stowell starred alongside Dominic Cooper as Hank in Stratton, a film following a British Special Boat Service commando who tracks down an international terrorist cell. Later, he portrayed Larry King in Battle of the Sexes, which followed the true story of the 1973 tennis match between World number one Billie Jean King and ex-champ and serial hustler Bobby Riggs. The film starred Emma Stone and Steve Carell. Stowell was also featured in the Fox television pilot Controversy as Matt Kellerman opposite Anthony Edwards and Erin Moriarty.

In 2018, Stowell appeared in the historical action drama 12 Strong where he portrayed Fred Falls. The film tells the story of the first Special Forces team deployed to Afghanistan after 9/11; under the leadership of a new captain, the team must work with an Afghan warlord to take down the Taliban. 12 Strong starred Chris Hemsworth, Michael Shannon, and Michael Peña. Stowell followed up with the sci-fi film Higher Power as Michael. In 2019, he portrayed the role of Nately in the Hulu mini-series Catch-22, based on the classic Joseph Heller novel, before starring opposite Haley Bennet in Swallow, playing the role of Richie Conrad.

In 2020, Stowell played one of the main characters in Blumhouse's Fantasy Island as Patrick Sullivan, which follows a collection of guests who live out their most elaborate fantasies in relative seclusion on a luxurious island. The film also starred Michael Peña, Maggie Q, Lucy Hale, and Ryan Hansen. He would also portray Lieutenant Theodore Cole in an episode of the Apple TV+ series Amazing Stories, the episode follows a WWII pilot crashing in modern-day Ohio, where a young widow and her stepson are swept up in his search for home.

Stowell appeared in an episode of The White Lotus as a hotel guest in 2021. During the holiday season, he would reunite with his Fantasy Island co-star Lucy Hale for the adaptation of Sally Thorne's romance novel The Hating Game where Stowell portrayed Joshua Templeman. In the summer of 2022, he appeared in the Netflix miniseries Keep Breathing, where he portrayed the role of Sam. The series follows Liv, the lone survivor of a plane crash in the Canadian wilderness.

In 2023, he starred in Peacock's A Friend of the Family limited series, portraying Pete Welch. The series follows the harrowing true story of the Broberg family, whose daughter Jan was kidnapped multiple times over a period of years in the 1970s by a charismatic, obsessed family "friend". Also in 2023, he appeared in four episodes of the Showtime miniseries Three Women, starring Shailene Woodley and Betty Gilpin.

In March 2024, he was announced to play a young Special Agent Leroy Jethro Gibbs in the new NCIS series NCIS: Origins, following his character as he begins his journey in the Naval Investigative Service (NIS). The series premiered on October 14.

He also starred in The Inheritance which was released in June 2024, where he portrayed Drew Abernathy alongside Peyton List and Rachel Nichols.

Stowell's upcoming projects include The Long Home, a film directed and starring James Franco, and This Tempting Madness, a thriller written and directed by Jennifer E. Montgomery.

== Filmography ==
=== Film ===
Year	Title	Role	Notes	Ref.
2011	Puncture	E.R. Medic		
2011	Dolphin Tale	Kyle Connellan		
2013	Love and Honor	Dalton Joiner		
2014	Whiplash	Ryan Connolly		
2014	Warren	Ted Gordon		
2014	Behaving Badly	Kevin Carpenter		
2014	Dolphin Tale 2	Kyle Connellan		
2015	Bridge of Spies	Francis Gary Powers		
2016	In Dubious Battle	Eddie		
2016	Colossal	Joel		
2017	Stratton	Hank		
2017	Battle of the Sexes	Larry King		
2018	12 Strong	Staff Sgt. Fred Falls		
2018	Higher Power	Michael		
2019	Swallow	Richie		
2020	Fantasy Island	Patrick Sullivan		
2021	The Hating Game	Joshua Templeman	Also executive producer	
2024	The Inheritance	Drew		
2025	This Tempting Madness	Jake		
TBA	The Long Home	TBA	Completed	

=== Television ===
Year	Title	Role	Notes	Ref.
2009	Secret Girlfriend	Chad	Episode: "You Get an Aquarium Girl"	
2009–2011	The Secret Life of the American Teenager	Jesse	17 episodes	
2010	90210		Episode: "Senior Year, Baby"	
2010	NCIS: Los Angeles	Marine Corporal Andrew Peterson	Episode: "Special Delivery"	
2013	Behind the Candelabra	Backstage Flirt	Television film	
2013	Shuffleton's Barbershop	Trey Cole	Television film	
2015	Public Morals	Sean O'Bannon	10 episodes	
2017	Controversy	Matt Kellerman	Television film	
2019	Catch-22	Nately	Series regular	
2020	Amazing Stories	Lieutenant Theodore Cole	Episode: "The Rift"	
2021	The White Lotus	Hotel Guest	Episode: "Departures"	
2022	Keep Breathing	Sam	4 episodes	
2022	A Friend of the Family	FBI Agent Pete Walsh	Miniseries	
2024	Three Women	Aidan	Recurring role; 4 episodes	
2024–present	NCIS: Origins	Leroy Jethro Gibbs	Main role	
