= Ted Tinling =

British tennis official and fashion designer

Ted Tingling
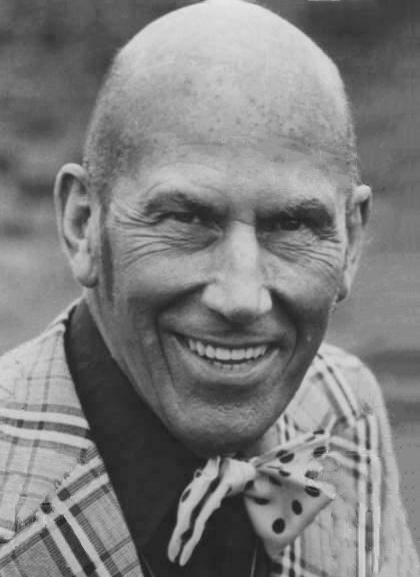
- Ted Tinling in 1975
- Born: 23 June 1910; Eastbourne, England
- Died: 23 May 1990 (aged 79); Cambridge, England
- Known for: Designing tennis uniforms
- Relatives: James Collingwood Tinling (brother)

Cuthbert Collingwood "Ted" Tinling (23 June 1910 – 23 May 1990), sometimes known as Teddy Tinling, was an English fashion designer, spy, author, and tennis official. He was a firm fixture on the professional tennis tour for over 60 years and is considered the foremost designer of tennis dresses of the 20th century.

== Early life ==
Tinling was born in Eastbourne, on the south coast of England, the son of James Alexander Tinling, a chartered accountant. In 1923, suffering from bronchial asthma, his parents sent him to the French Riviera on doctor's orders. It was there he began playing tennis, particularly at the Nice Tennis Club where Suzanne Lenglen practised.

Despite Tinling's youth, Lenglen's father asked him if he would umpire one of Lenglen's upcoming matches. He became her personal umpire for two years in between a short career as a player himself. This friendship with Lenglen led him to his first Wimbledon Championships in 1927, where he became player liaison until 1949. During the Second World War, he was a Lieutenant-Colonel in the Intelligence Corps in Algiers and Germany.

== Career as designer ==
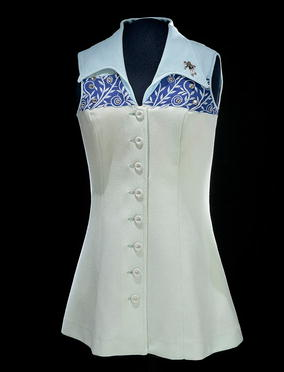
A Tinling dress for Billie Jean King (1973)

Tinling designed a wedding dress for the British two-time Wimbledon singles champion, Dorothy Round on the occasion of her marriage in 1937. He also designed dresses for almost all of the great female players throughout the 1950s, 1960s and 1970s. His dresses were worn by the Wimbledon ladies' champion throughout the 1960s and 1970s. The last Wimbledon champion to wear a Tinling creation was Martina Navratilova in 1979 when she wore his designs to triumph in both the singles and doubles events. In 1983, Billie Jean King wore a Tinling dress in a final for the last time, when she reached the Wimbledon Mixed Doubles final. The last Tinling dress worn at Wimbledon was by Rosemary Casals in 1984, when she lost in the first round. Although he only ever designed dresses for Chris Evert's Federation & Wightman Cup appearances, he designed her wedding dress when she married John Lloyd in 1979.

A close friend of Billie Jean King – designing her dress for the famous "Battle of the Sexes" tennis match in 1973 – he became player liaison on the Virginia Slims Women's Tennis Association tour that King helped to create. He continued to design daring and unusual dresses for stars such as Martina Navratilova, Chris Evert, Evonne Goolagong and Virginia Wade throughout this time but his role in the infrastructure of tennis became more important and he became an official media spokesperson for the game.

== 1949 Wimbledon controversy ==
It was a design in 1949 that led to him being asked to take leave from his position at Wimbledon. That year he designed not only the dress for Gussie Moran, but also a pair of white underwear that were adorned with lace, creating a sensation, with photographers fighting for positions where they could get low-angle shots of Moran. Wimbledon chairman Sir Louis Greig became furious with Tinling for "having drawn attention to the sexual area". He was banned from the tournament for 33 years, only being invited back on the grounds of the All England Lawn Tennis Club in 1982, when he retook his position as player liaison.

The incident created a media frenzy, drawing public attention to both Tinling and Moran. While the Wimbledon officials accused Moran of "putting sin and vulgarity into tennis", the media dubbed her "Gorgeous Gussie". According to Tinling himself, "the situation snowballed out of all proportion. Gussie was inundated with requests for personal appearances – hospitals, garden fetes and beauty contests. The Marx Brothers, in London at the time, invited her to join their act. A racehorse, an aircraft and a restaurant's special sauce were named after her. She was voted the best dressed sports woman by the US Fashion Academy. The whole thing was staggering."

== Later life ==
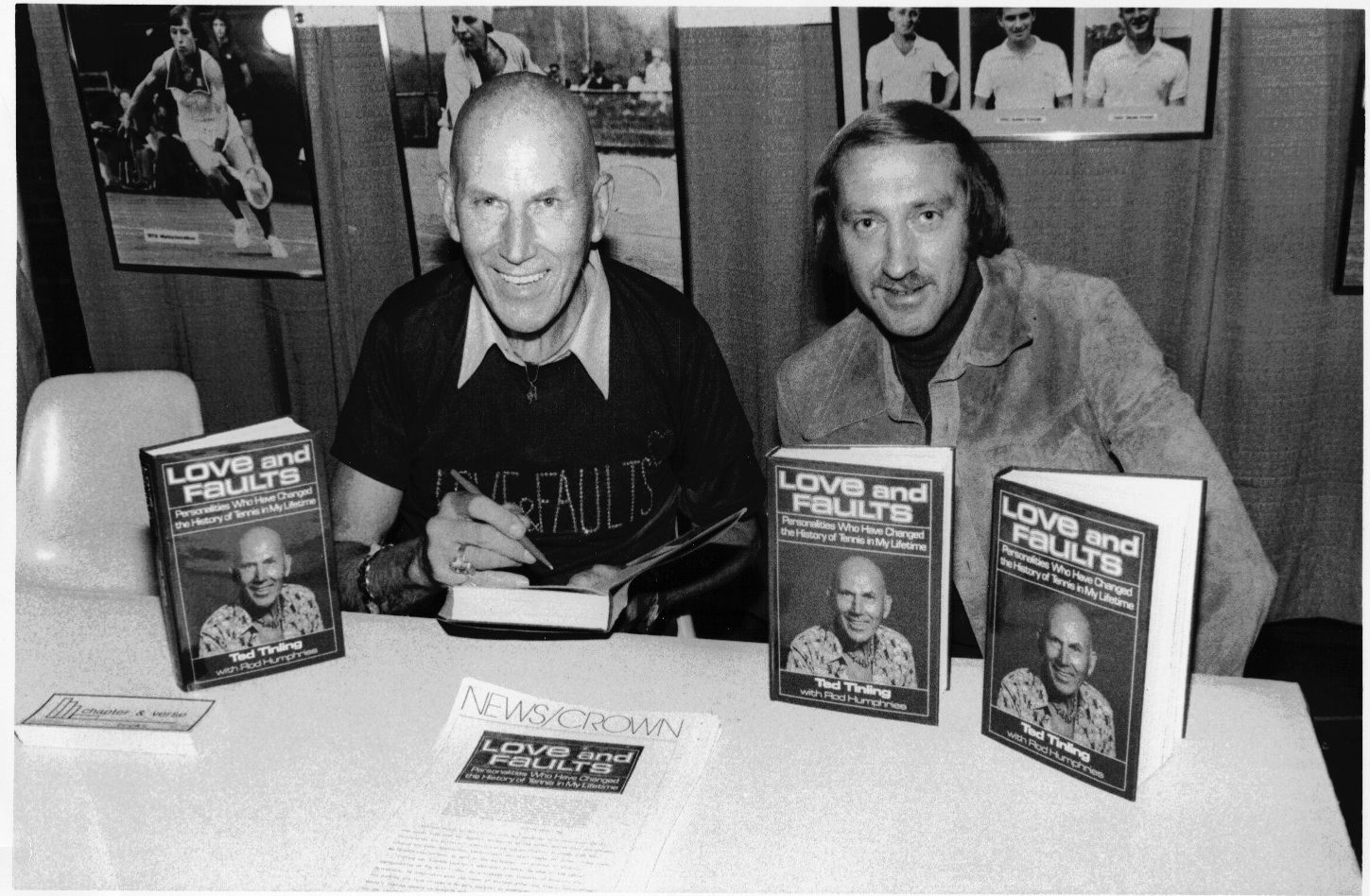
Ted Tinling and Rod Humphries in 1979

In 1975, Tinling moved to Philadelphia. He remained a consultant to the women's tour even after he gave up design in his old age. He was inducted into the International Tennis Hall of Fame in 1986.

He wrote several books on tennis in the 1980s, but respiratory problems continued to affect him and he died in 1990. After his death it was revealed he had been a British Intelligence spy during the Second World War.

== Personal life ==
Tinling was openly gay. His brother, RAF officer James Collingwood Tinling, was a member of the team that built the first jet engine.

== Portrayals ==
Tinling has been portrayed in two movies concerning the Battle of the Sexes tennis match played in 1973 between Bobby Riggs & Billie Jean King. In the 2001 TV Movie When Billie Beat Bobby, he was portrayed by American actor Gerry Becker and in the 2017 cinema release Battle of the Sexes, Tinling was played by British star Alan Cumming. Cumming played the role with a full head of hair, whereas Becker had played the part bald; accurately reflecting Tinling's appearance.

== Works ==
- Tinling, Ted (1979). Love and Faults: Personalities Who Have Changed the History of Tennis. Crown. ASIN B000RQF87C.
- Tinling, Ted (1983), Tinling: Sixty Years in Tennis. ISBN 978-0283989636
- Tinling, Ted (1984). Tinling. Sidgwick & Jackson. ISBN 978-0-283-98963-6.
