= Battle of the Sexes (2017 film) =

Film by Valerie Faris and Jonathan Dayton

- Theatrical release poster
- Directed by: Valerie Faris; Jonathan Dayton
- Written by: Simon Beaufoy
- Produced by: Christian Colson; Danny Boyle; Robert Graf
- Starring: Emma Stone; Steve Carell; Andrea Riseborough; Sarah Silverman; Bill Pullman; Alan Cumming; Eric Christian Olsen; Elisabeth Shue
- Cinematography: Linus Sandgren
- Edited by: Pamela Martin
- Music by: Nicholas Britell
- Production companies: Decibel Films; Cloud Eight Films
- Distributed by: Fox Searchlight Pictures
- Release dates: September 2, 2017 (Telluride); September 22, 2017 (United States); November 24, 2017 (United Kingdom)
- Running time: 121 minutes
- Countries: United Kingdom; United States
- Language: English
- Budget: $25 million
- Box office: $18.6 million

Battle of the Sexes is a 2017 biographical sports comedy-drama film directed by Valerie Faris and Jonathan Dayton and written by Simon Beaufoy. The plot is loosely based on the 1973 tennis match between Billie Jean King and Bobby Riggs. The film stars Emma Stone and Steve Carell as King and Riggs, leading an ensemble cast including Andrea Riseborough, Sarah Silverman, Austin Stowell, Bill Pullman, Alan Cumming, Eric Christian Olsen, and Elisabeth Shue in supporting roles.

The film had its premiere at the 44th Telluride Film Festival on September 2, 2017, and was theatrically released in the United States by Fox Searchlight Pictures on September 22, 2017. It received positive reviews from critics and grossed $18.6 million.

At the 75th Golden Globe Awards, Stone and Carell received nominations for Best Actress – Motion Picture Musical or Comedy and Best Actor – Motion Picture Musical or Comedy respectively. Both received Critics Choice Awards nominations in the categories Best Actress in a Comedy and Best Actor in a Comedy. At the 24th Screen Actors Guild Awards, Carell received a nomination for Outstanding Performance by a Male Actor in a Supporting Role.

== Plot ==
In 1970, pro-tennis player Billie Jean King and her manager, Gladys Heldman, confront promoter Jack Kramer, who has organized a tennis tournament for which the top prize for women is one-eighth of the men's prize despite equal ticket sales. King and Heldman threaten to start their own tour but Kramer won't alter the terms, citing the inferiority of women's tennis. When King, and fellow tennis players Julie Heldman, Valerie Ziegenfuss, Judy Dalton, Kristy Pigeon, Peaches Bartkowicz, Kerry Melville Reid, Nancy Richey, and Rosie Casals sign on as the “Original 9” players of what becomes the WTA Tour, Kramer bans them from tournaments organized by the U.S. Lawn Tennis Association.

Weary from relentless touring and promotion efforts, Billie Jean King begins an affair with Marilyn Barnett, her hairdresser, threatening her marriage to Larry King. Retired men's pro-tennis player Bobby Riggs's marriage to the wealthy Priscilla Whelan is increasingly strained by his addiction to gambling. Thrown out of his house when he can't conceal a Rolls-Royce he won in a tennis bet, he hits upon the idea of a challenge match against the top female player, boasting that even at age 55 he can beat any woman.

The women's tour has slowly gained a stronger foothold, with the Women's Tennis Association formed in 1973. Disgusted by Riggs, King declines to face him. Riggs then persuades Margaret Court, who recently overtook King to gain the World No. 1 ranking, to play a match in May 1973. Riggs easily defeats Court and King agrees to a second match, but demands a final say as to the arrangements. King trains intensely in contrast to Riggs' indifferent attitude. King objects to Kramer's selection as a color commentator, threatening to not play unless he withdraws, which he does. After a slow start, King defeats Riggs, changing the future of women's tennis.

A textual epilogue states that King divorced her husband in the 1980s, retired from tennis in 1990, and later became involved in a long-term same-sex relationship while Riggs reunited with his wife but never quit his gambling habit.

== Cast ==
- Emma Stone as Billie Jean King
- Steve Carell as Bobby Riggs
- Andrea Riseborough as Marilyn Barnett
- Sarah Silverman as Gladys Heldman
- Bill Pullman as Jack Kramer
- Alan Cumming as Cuthbert "Ted" Tinling
- Elisabeth Shue as Priscilla Riggs
- Austin Stowell as Larry King
- Natalie Morales as Rosie Casals (“Original 9”)
- Jessica McNamee as Margaret Court
- Fred Armisen as Rheo Blair
- Lewis Pullman as Larry Riggs
- Martha MacIsaac as Jane “Peaches” Bartkowicz (“Original 9”)
- Mickey Sumner as Valerie Ziegenfuss (“Original 9”)
- Bridey Elliott as Julie Heldman (“Original 9”)
- Eric Christian Olsen as Lornie Kuhle
- Wallace Langham as Henry
- Matt Malloy as Rigg's Therapist
- Dan Bakkedahl as Gamblers Anon Leader
- Chris Parnell as DJ
- Bob Stephenson as PR Sugar Daddy
- John C. McGinley as Bobby’s friend
- James Mackay as Barry Court
- Lauren Kline as Nancy Richey (“Original 9”)
- Ashley Weinhold as Kristy Pigeon (“Original 9”)
- Fidan Manashirova as Judy Tegart Dalton (“Original 9”)
- Kaitlyn Christian as Kerry Melville Reid (“Original 9”)
- Mike Vogel as Nightclub Dancer
- Tom Kenny as Bob Sanders

== Production ==
The project and its two leads were announced in April 2015. Brie Larson was, for a brief period, set to replace Stone due to scheduling conflicts, but these were cleared up. On March 3, 2016, Andrea Riseborough was cast to play Marilyn Barnett, King's hairdresser and lover. Later that month, three more were cast in the film, Elisabeth Shue as Riggs's wife; Austin Stowell as Larry King, Billie Jean's husband; and Sarah Silverman as Gladys Heldman, the founder of World Tennis magazine. Four actors joined the cast in April: Eric Christian Olsen as Lornie Kuhle, Jessica McNamee as tennis player Margaret Court, Alan Cumming as designer Ted Tinling, and Natalie Morales as player Rosie Casals.

Principal photography on the film began in Los Angeles on April 13, 2016, with a budget of more than $25 million.

For the tennis match scenes, tennis players Kaitlyn Christian (who portrays “Original 9” member Kerry Melville Reid) and Vince Spadea were the body doubles of Stone and Carell, respectively.

=== Music ===
The score was composed by Nicholas Britell. He also co-wrote the original song "If I Dare" with Sara Bareilles who also performed it.

== Release ==
Battle of the Sexes had its world premiere at the Telluride Film Festival on September 2, 2017. It also screened at the Toronto International Film Festival on September 10, 2017, and at the BFI London Film Festival on October 7, 2017. The film began a limited release in the United States on September 22, 2017, before going wide the following week.

== Reception ==
=== Box office ===
Battle of the Sexes grossed $12.6 million in the United States and Canada, and $5.8 million in other territories, for a worldwide total of $18.4 million.

In its opening weekend, the film grossed $515,450 from 21 theaters, an average of $24,545 per theater. The film expanded the following Friday, where it was released alongside the openings of Flatliners, 'Til Death Do Us Part and American Made, and was projected to gross around $6 million from 1,213 theaters over the weekend. It ended up making $3.4 million over the weekend, finishing 6th at the box office. Deadline Hollywood noted the film's weekend gross was disappointing given its cast and positive reviews. The following week the film was added to another 609 theaters and made $2.4 million, dropping just 30%.

=== Critical response ===
On the review aggregation website Rotten Tomatoes, the film has an approval rating of 84% based on 313 reviews, with an average rating of 7.2/10. The site's critical consensus reads, "Battle of the Sexes turns real-life events into a crowd-pleasing, well-acted dramedy that ably entertains while smartly serving up a volley of present-day parallels." Metacritic assigned the film a weighted average score of 73 out of 100 based on 46 critics, indicating "generally favorable" reviews. Audiences polled by CinemaScore gave the film an average grade of "A" on an A+ to F scale, while PostTrak reported filmgoers gave the film an overall positive score of 74%.

=== Accolades ===
Year	Award	Category	Nominee(s)	Result	Ref.
2018	AARP's Movies for Grownups Awards	Best Actor	Steve Carell	Nominated	
2018	AARP's Movies for Grownups Awards	Best Time Capsule	Battle of the Sexes	Nominated	
2018	Casting Society of America	Studio or Independent – Comedy	Justine Arteta and Kim Davis-Wagner	Nominated	
2018	Critics' Choice Movie Awards	Best Actor in a Comedy	Steve Carell	Nominated	
2018	Critics' Choice Movie Awards	Best Actress in a Comedy	Emma Stone	Nominated	
2018	Dorian Awards	LGBTQ Film of the Year	Battle of the Sexes	Nominated	
2018	GLAAD Media Awards	Outstanding Film – Wide Release	Battle of the Sexes	Nominated	
2018	Golden Globe Awards	Best Actor – Motion Picture Musical or Comedy	Steve Carell	Nominated	
2018	Golden Globe Awards	Best Actress – Motion Picture Comedy or Musical	Emma Stone	Nominated	
2018	Satellite Awards	Best Actress – Motion Picture	Emma Stone	Nominated	
2018	Screen Actors Guild Awards	Outstanding Actor in a Supporting Role	Steve Carell	Nominated	

== See also ==
- When Billie Beat Bobby
