= Stratton (film) =

- Directed by: Simon West
- Written by: Duncan Falconer; Warren Davis II
- Based on: Stratton series by Duncan Falconer
- Produced by: Matthew Jenkins
- Starring: Dominic Cooper; Gemma Chan; Austin Stowell; Tyler Hoechlin; Tom Felton; Olegar Fedoro
- Cinematography: Felix Wiedemann
- Edited by: Andrew MacRitchie
- Music by: Nathaniel Méchaly
- Production company: GFM Films
- Distributed by: Vertigo Films
- Release date: 1 September 2017 (United Kingdom)
- Running time: 95 minutes
- Country: United Kingdom
- Language: English
- Budget: £12.9 million

Stratton is a 2017 British action thriller film directed by Simon West, based on the novel series of the same name by Duncan Falconer. The series' lead character John Stratton is played by Dominic Cooper, while the rest of the cast includes Gemma Chan, Austin Stowell, Tyler Hoechlin, and Tom Felton. Principal photography on the film began on 15 July 2015 in Brindisi, Italy. The film was released in the UK on 1 September 2017.

== Plot ==
After a failed mission to destroy an Iranian bioweapon, British Special Boat Service operator Sergeant John Stratton (Dominic Cooper), working for the Intelligence Detachment in Northern Ireland, tracks down the terrorist cell who used the mission as cover to steal the weapon for their own purposes. Due to the failed mission, Stratton suspects a mole. His boss Sumner recognizes the terrorist leader as Grigory Barovsky, a Russian spy, presumed dead for nearly twenty years. They learn a bomb maker has developed a drone system to disperse the bioweapon, which is more lethal at high altitudes, and track the terrorists to Rome.

There is a speedboat chase with heavy gunfire, before the final action sequence, which takes place in London with the poison device loaded onto a double-decker bus whose destination is shown as Clapham Common (so as to blend in). The device is configured to automatically deploy (via a drone) through an opening cut into the bus's roof once it arrives at a location preprogrammed into the device's firmware.

Stratton and his American counterpart Hank chase after the bus in a Range Rover to stop Barovsky from deploying the device. During the chase sequence, Stratton jumps from the Range Rover to board the bus where he is involved in a struggle with one of Barovsky's accomplices. Whilst being choked by Barovsky's accomplice he shouts across to Hank, who is still driving alongside the bus, to use a grenade to stop the bus. Hank throws the grenade under the bus which explodes and causes the bus to flip on its side, slide and crash. Barovsky tries to launch the drone manually but is shot and killed. An anti-terrorist unit blows up the drone.

== Cast ==
- Dominic Cooper as John Stratton
- Gemma Chan as Aggy
- Austin Stowell as Hank
- Tyler Hoechlin as Marty
- Tom Felton as Cummings
- Thomas Kretschmann as Grigory Barovsky
- Olegar Fedoro as Sergei Orlov
- Derek Jacobi as Ross
- Connie Nielsen as Sumner
- Yuri Kolokolnikov as Borodin
- Igal Naor as Tariq Alawi

== Production ==
On 3 November 2014 it was announced that Henry Cavill would next star in the action thriller film Stratton, to be produced by his own banner Promethean Productions, Amber Entertainment, and GFM Films. It would be based on Duncan Falconer's eight-novel series of the same name, featuring the lead character John Stratton, an SBS soldier working for the Intelligence Detachment in Northern Ireland. The film, produced by Ileen Maisel and Lawrence Elman, who also bought the film rights to the novel, would be set in Southern Italy, Rome and London.

On 25 February 2015 Simon West was hired to direct the film, which was fully financed by GFM Films. Five days before the filming was set to begin, Cavill exited the film due to creative differences with the script. Later it was announced that Dominic Cooper would take over the title role.

Other cast members include Gemma Chan, Austin Stowell, Tyler Hoechlin, and Tom Felton. More cast was announced by Screen Daily, which included Thomas Kretschmann, Derek Jacobi, Connie Nielsen and Jake Fairbrother.

According to Hardman & Co. the budget for Stratton was £12.9m and Ober Private Clients assisted GFM in the financing of this film through an EIS fund raise. The 30 June 2017 confirmation statement for Stratton Film Productions Limited filed at the UK's Companies House suggests EIS investors contributed £3,358,000 towards financing the film. Accounts filed at UK's Companies House disclose the production of the film was partly financed with a £7.5m loan from GFM films. According to Hardman & Co. HMRC contributed £2m to producing the film with tax credit subsidies.

=== Filming ===
Principal photography on the film began on 15 July 2015 in Brindisi, Lecce, Squinzano and Casalabate, Italy, and then the shooting would move to Rome and then to London. Filming was previously set to begin on 2 June, but was rescheduled after Cavill left the film.

== Critical response ==
On Rotten Tomatoes, Stratton has an approval rating of 0% based on 35 reviews, with an average rating of 3.2/10. The website's critical consensus reads, "Stratton's action-thriller ambitions are roundly thwarted by a derivative story, misguided casting, and a low-budget feel underscored by unimpressive set pieces." On Metacritic it has a weighted average score of 26 out of 100, based on reviews from 10 critics.

Kim Newman of Empire gives the film 2 out of 5. "Dialogue is all-cliché, a decent cast get not much to go on [...], and even the action scenes have a rushed, unfinished feel." Newman praises Chan as "the standout player". Director Simon West doesn't match "the high-water mark of his lunatic debut Con Air." Peter Bradshaw of The Guardian gave the film 2 out 5 stars, calling it a "medium-budget, moderately silly action-thriller" that "is partly redeemed by its cheerfully outrageous finale involving a chase-slash-shootout with a car and a double-decker London bus somewhere in the countryside. That's good value." Bradshaw is critical of Derek Jacobi's minor role and of Connie Nielsen's "bizarre British accent". Also writing in The Guardian, Wendy Ide described the film as "[l]ess an action movie, more a direct breach of the Geneva conventions" and was also critical of Nielsen, "Connie Nielsen is staggeringly bad as Stratton’s boss. She sounds like a drunk person trying to do a posh accent to get out of being breathalysed. A career low." Tim Robey of The Telegraph sums up the film: "Wholly useless, entirely harmless, Stratton would be good clean fun, if it was good or fun."

Stephen Dalton of The Hollywood Reporter was critical of the "creaky script and dim-witted plot" saying the film "offers little but dusty old thriller cliches borrowed from better films." Dennis Harvey of Variety wrote: "Solidly professional in overall packaging yet clichéd, pedestrian and indistinct in specific contributions, this thriller never finds (let alone raises) its own pulse."

== See also ==
- List of films with a 0% rating on Rotten Tomatoes
