= Rod Humphries =

Australian journalist and author (born 1943)

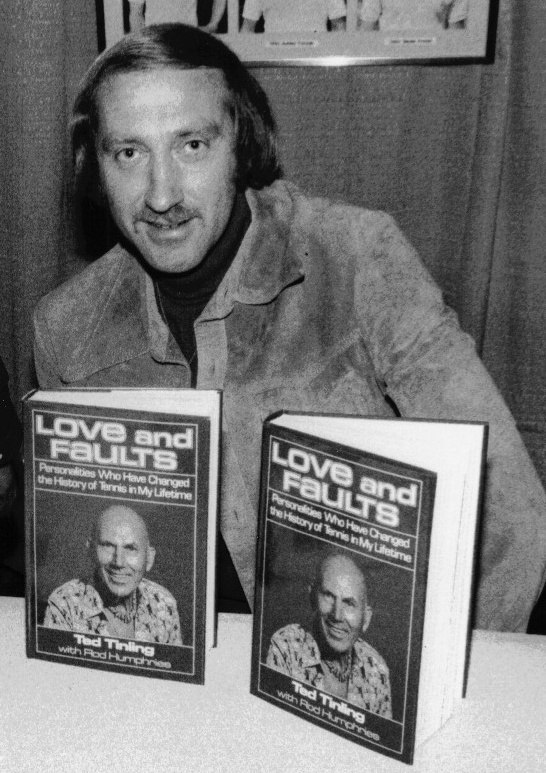
- Humphries in 1979
- Born: 18 September 1943 (age 83); Sydney, Australia
- Citizenship: Australia & United States

Rodney Dennis Humphries (born 18 September 1943) is an Australian-born author, newspaper/magazine journalist and television writer. Humphries began his writing career at the age of 17 as a general reporter for an Australian wire service. He became a sports journalist covering international events for major Australian dailies and wrote his first book, Lionel Rose: Australian at age 25. Humphries was also head writer and assistant producer of the Australian television show This is Your Life. Humphries moved permanently to the United States in 1977 when a tennis book he was commissioned to write in New York was followed by an offer from oilman and sports entrepreneur Lamar Hunt to join the staff of Dallas-based World Championship Tennis (WCT). He has had three books published in the United States, the most recent in 2013, Little League to the Major Leagues.

== Family origins and early life ==
Rod Humphries is a direct descendant of a 26-year-old convict transported from Ireland to the British penal colony at Sydney Cove, New South Wales, Australia, in 1793, and of a 23-year-old Scottish "bounty immigrant" who arrived "free" in the colony in 1837. Patrick Humphrys, (the spelling would later be changed by government recorders) was sentenced to seven years penal servitude in Australia for stealing 200 weight of sheet lead in Dublin, Ireland. He spent 173 days on the convict ship The Boddingtons, which arrived on 7 August 1793, only five years after the First Fleet of convicts to Australia established the country as a British colony. After completing his sentence, Patrick was granted permission in 1801 to join the British Army in Australia, and served for 22 years and 195 days. On 28 February 1802, Patrick married Irish immigrant, Catherine McMahon (née Mooney), the widow of one of Patrick's fellow soldiers, Terrence McMahon, a convict ship guard who drowned in Sydney Harbour on 7 September 1801. Humphries' maternal great-great-grandfather, Scottish carpenter and cabinet maker John David Farquhar, received a bounty of 10 pounds from the government to migrate to Australia which desperately needed tradesmen for the colony. Farquhar arrived on The City of Edinburgh on 31 August 1837, leaving behind legal problems associated with a paternity suit.

Humphries was born to Jack and Mavis Humphries (née Farquhar) in Paddington, Sydney, Australia, at a time the Australian government officially commemorates as the Battle for Australia (1942–43) of World War II. His sister Gae Denise Butler was born in 1947. Humphries’ maternal grandfather, Norman Farquhar, 52, who enlisted as a deputy senior air raid warden in Sydney, was buried alive on 12 October 1942 when a military trench he was digging in preparation for a possible Japanese invasion caved in during heavy rain. A shell from a Japanese submarine hit outside the crowded Humphries' tenement in east Sydney on 8 June 1942, knocking Humphries’ mother Mavis semi-conscious, breaking windows, the front door, and weakening upstairs floor boards. Humphries’ uncle, Bob Humphries, who joined the military at 17, was captured by the Japanese Army as it swept through Malaya and Singapore and spent the rest of the war in the Changi Japanese prisoner-of-war camp. His father Jack Humphries fought in the jungles of New Guinea, just 100 miles north of Australia, contracting malaria that recurred for years after the war. Jack Humphries, who also trained American soldiers in jungle warfare as part of the Pacific campaign, led the march and took the official salute for the Australian Forces at the last Anzac Day in Wewak, New Guinea, in 1973 prior to New Guinea's independence from Australia.

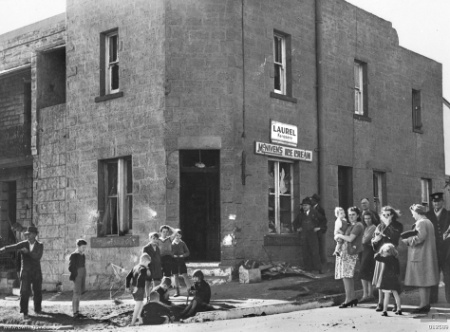
Shelling damage in Sydney, Australia. The Humphries family occupied the narrow strip on the left side of the building, adjacent to the corner store.

While military fortifications were installed at Sydney Harbour and coastal beaches in an effort to thwart any attempt at a land invasion, and many fled the coastal cities for the safety of nearby mountains, the Humphries family stayed in Sydney and pooled resources. Three generations of the extended Humphries/Farquhar family hunkered down in an overcrowded, narrow, two-story, two-bedroom tenement with neither indoor toilet facilities nor refrigeration attached to a general store on the corner of Small and Fletcher Streets, Woollahra, East Sydney. While his father was at war, Humphries' father figure at the war-time home was his uncle George Smith, a former professional fighter in the Great Depression who had injuries from his boxing days which precluded him from serving in the military.

During the difficult wartime and post-war conditions, the Humphries family struggled to make ends meet and after the war supplemented its income by operating an illegal bookmaking business, providing horse race gambling for local communities in east Sydney. Police made several raids on the Humphries' home and in a Doberman Quarterly magazine interview in 1997 Humphries recalled police arresting his father: "I can still vividly recall all those Gambling Squad guys looking like Elliot Ness hitting our doors, windows, and coming over the back fence in a raid. My grandmother would shove betting slips down her bra and I would stuff them in my pants and run." Beginning in his mid-teens, Humphries worked part-time brush painting hand tools at a neighbourhood ironworks factory, and later worked assembling eyeglasses at another company. The sport of tennis boomed as a low-cost recreation in Australia after the War, and Humphries's mother, a league player, introduced him to the sport. Beginning at 12, Humphries made a few shillings attending to clay courts at several facilities and helping the professional coaches by working on basic instruction with very young beginners. The money also went toward his tennis lessons. Over time, tennis dramatically changed the course of his life and led to his permanent move to the United States in 1977.

== Career in Australia ==
Humphries was first published at 13 years of age in 1956 in the Randwick Boys' High School yearbook after a poem he wrote about the Olympic Games in Melbourne that year won a school-wide competition. Four years later he landed a job as a copyboy at a small national wire service, Australian United Press (AUP). He quickly became a fully-fledged journalist at AUP, covering national and local politics, law courts, police rounds, the stock exchange, the trade union movement, features and sports for newspapers and radio stations. After four years as a general reporter, Humphries specialised in sports, and from 1964 through 1977 he was a full-time sports journalist/columnist, covering events at home and overseas, including in America, Asia and Europe, for Australia's oldest newspaper, The Sydney Morning Herald and its sister Sunday paper, The Sun-Herald. He wrote columns entitled "Inside Sport," "Days of Glory," "Rod Humphries Looks at League", and a whimsical column in the tabloid Sunday paper, "Rod Humphries Writes…"

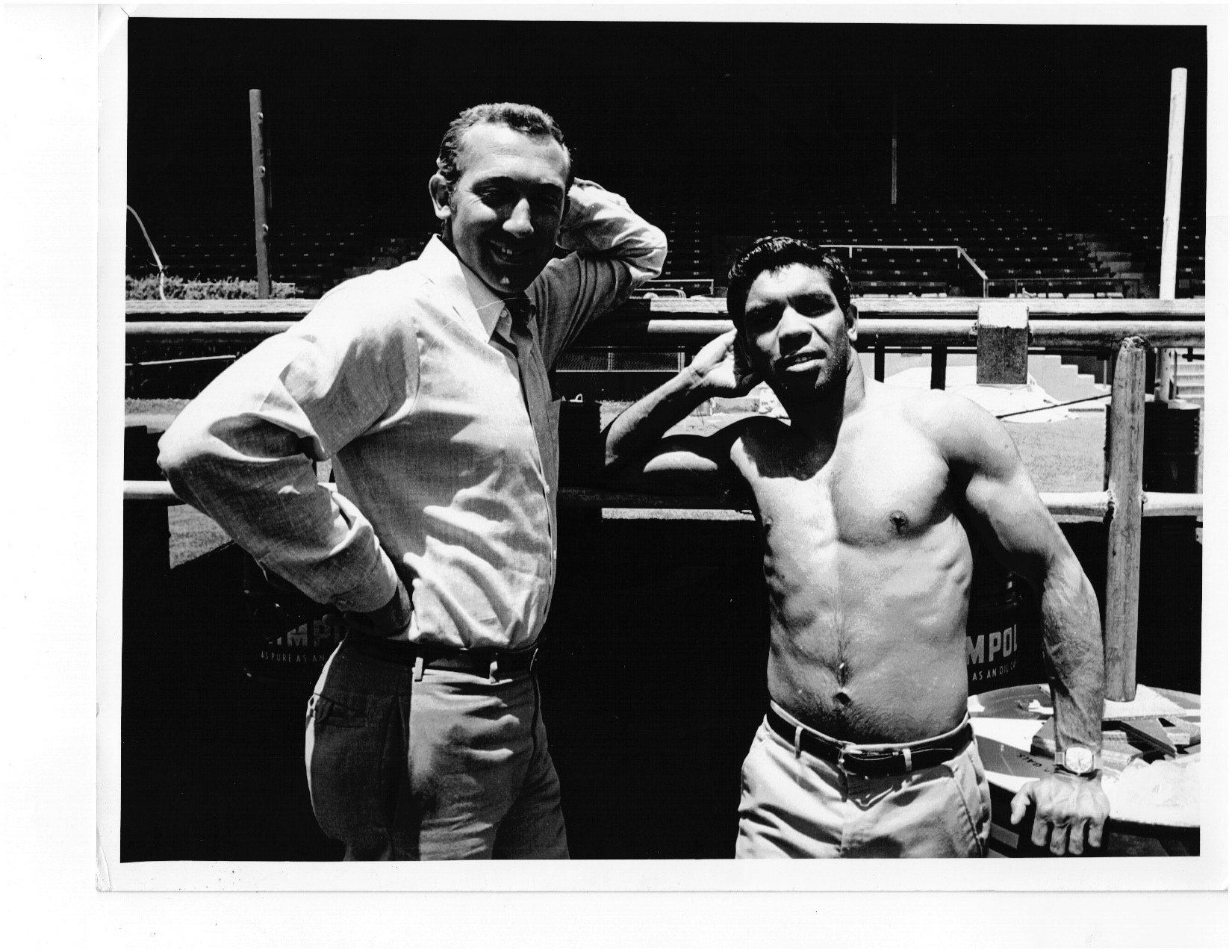
Rod Humphries with Lionel Rose

At age 25, Humphries teamed with Lionel Rose, an Australian Aborigine then 19 years of age, to write Rose's life story in the book Lionel Rose: Australian, which told how Rose, who came from tough beginnings in the Australian outback, won the world bantamweight boxing title from the seemingly unbeatable hometown champion, Masahiko "Fighting" Harada, in Tokyo, Japan, on 27 February 1968. Humphries was also head writer and assistant producer of the Australian national television show This Is Your Life, (a franchise of Ralph Edwards' iconic American show ), for the first 100 shows from its beginning in 1975 through 1977, when he moved to the United States. He was offered a writing job on the show after he helped the producers to prepare for the first show to air, the life of Lionel Rose, on 14 September 1975. Humphries was introduced on the show.

In March 1976, the Australian Broadcasting Corporation chose Humphries to represent Australia's print sports journalists in a national television documentary on its popular Sportsnight series, titled Action Replay, which chronicled the planning, interviewing, writing and editorial production of a story in his day as a sports journalist. Humphries was also involved in the planning of another Sportsnight documentary, King of the Channel, which won the Best Sporting Documentary at the 1977 Australian Logie Awards. Hall of Fame long-distance swimmer, Des Renford, asked Humphries to script, in advance, probable interaction and conversations between Renford and his attendant boat crew for the filming of his 10th English Channel crossing. In his autobiography, Nothing Great Is Easy Renford praised Humphries as "an outstanding sportswriter and a bloke who helped me a lot…"

Humphries was an accomplished representative junior tournament tennis player in Australia and later a part-time professional tennis coach in Australia and the United States. His knowledge of the sport helped him become a high-profile tennis writer who was nominated as International Tennis Writer of the year in 1975 by the worldwide players’ union, the Association of Tennis Professionals. He covered the beginning of Open tennis in 1968 and all the machinations leading to the Grand Slam tournaments and other strictly amateur events being thrown open to professionals in a historic moment in the sport. World Championship Tennis (WCT) was a catalyst to forcing Open tennis and Humphries covered the first ever WCT event, a made-for-television tournament on a hastily erected court in the parking lot of ATN Channel 7 television studios in Epping, Sydney, Australia, in January 1968. In 1978, Humphries detailed the success of Australians, including two-time full Grand Slam winner Rod Laver, in the first 10 years of Open Tennis, in a contributing chapter of a book titled The Best of the Last Ten Years in Australian Sport. Based on his nomination as International Tennis Writer of the Year, in 1975 WCT invited Humphries to witness its championship events in Mexico City and Dallas, which led to his permanent move to the United States.

== Career in the United States ==
The English tennis enthusiast, fashion designer, and spy Cuthbert Collingwood "Ted" Tinling commissioned Humphries to write his memoir, Love and Faults, during a visit to Sydney in 1976. A year later Humphries travelled to Tinling's then home city of Philadelphia to finish the book, and at that time WCT of Dallas, owned by oilman and sports entrepreneur Lamar Hunt approached Humphries to join the company. Humphries accepted the offer, turning down a new contract with This Is Your Life in Australia, and permanently moved to the United States.

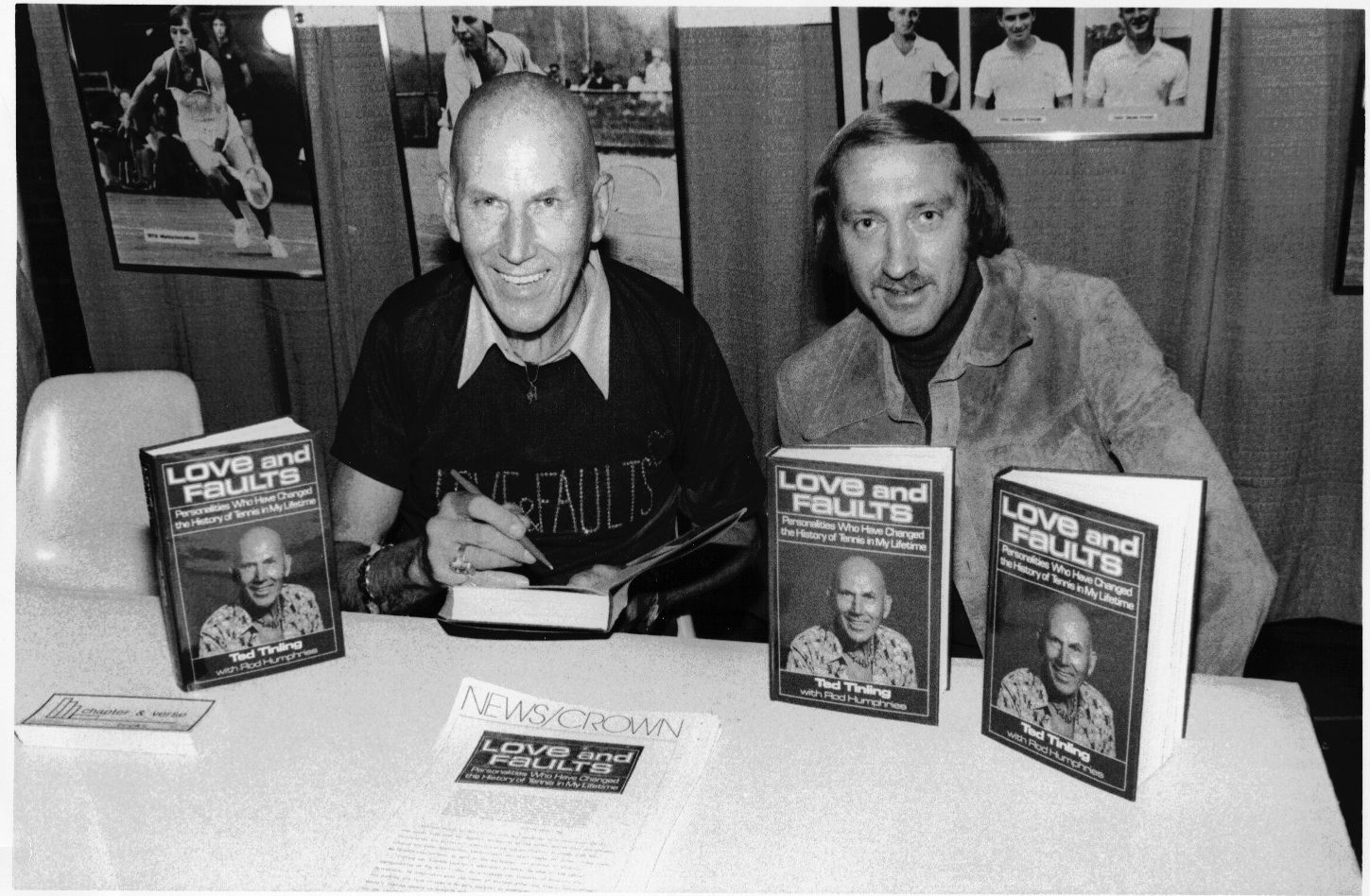
Rod Humphries with Ted Tinling

For five years from 1979 through 1983, he held the positions of director of public relations, Director of Tournaments, chief operating officer and deputy executive director, and was tournament director of the WCT Finals in Dallas in 1981—labeled at the time as the "Fifth Grand Slam"—which was won by John McEnroe. During Humphries' tenure, the WCT tour had 22 events a year in 12 countries, featuring all the world's leading players including McEnroe, Jimmy Connors, Björn Borg and Ivan Lendl. Humphries also conceived and organised an annual WCT Reunion Stars event for Hall-of-Famers, the first being in 1980 for Rod Laver, Ken Rosewall, John Newcombe and Roy Emerson. Humphries organised worldwide tournaments, recruited players, wrote and published 250-plus page WCT Media Guides, played a role in the New York-based WCT Television Network and the company's player management arm WCT Pro Management, and was a key player in developing an alternative world ranking system to that of the Association of Tennis Professionals, the Nixdorf Computer Rankings. WCT, which conducted the first "Million Dollar Tour," was the first to introduce coloured clothing and the tiebreaker, and was the first entity anywhere in the world of professional or amateur sports to produce in-house television coverage of its events. Started in 1977, WCT-TV had, by Humphries' first year with the company in 1979, sold 38 weeks of its packaged events to more than 70 per cent of the United States and many overseas countries. WCT events were also televised live by ABC in America and the BBC in Britain and in 1980 WCT had the first professional sports events ever televised live by a newly formed cable network, Entertainment and Sports Programing Network (later simply ESPN). Humphries wrote the scripts for commentator Jim Simpson for documentary specials in 1980 and 1981 about the WCT tour titled "The Road to Dallas," the first ever in-house ESPN documentaries. Humphries left WCT in 1983 when the tour was cut to a mere five events for 1984 following an anti-trust lawsuit filed against the Men's International Professional Tennis Council that administered the establishment Grand Prix and its powerful Grand Slam events. WCT quietly dissolved in 1990. Humphries became media director for the Lipton International Players Championship (now the Miami Open (tennis)) in Delray Beach and Key Biscayne, Florida, from 1986 to 1988.

In America, Humphries continued to cover major events such as a Muhammad Ali world title fight, Wimbledon, and the US Open tennis championships. For 20 years after moving to the United States, Humphries wrote articles for publication in America and regular freelance sports articles and columns for Australian and New Zealand newspapers. His newspaper columns included "Rod Humphries Writes," "Inside Sport," "This Is America" and a news page column titled "The Dallas File with Rod Humphries" in The Sun-Herald and The Sydney Morning Herald, and "Stateside" in the national newspaper, The Australian, and The Dominion, in Wellington, New Zealand. Humphries also did live weekly radio interviews on American sport with 4BC in Brisbane and occasionally for 2SM in Sydney and 3UZ in Melbourne. In the days before international television coverage and the internet, his columns and radio reports played a part in popularising American football for Australian sports fans, and when the Super Bowl was first televised live in Australia in the late 1970s, he was asked to write comprehensive newspaper articles with rules and charts on how the game was played.

Humphries has had three books published in America: the Tinling story, Love and Faults; The Doberman Pinscher, and Little League to the Major Leagues, an insider guide to baseball's assembly line from youth leagues to the pros. The baseball book was written after Humphries—who was an All Star Little League coach—helped guide his son, Justin, from Little League to the pros where he was drafted out of high school by the Houston Astros in 2001.

== Canine authority ==
Humphries is also an authority and prolific writer on canines. He authored The Doberman Pinscher, has lectured at a national seminar on the practical use of canine genetics, and was nominated for an award at the Dog Writers Association of America for an article in the 2007 September/October issue of The Doberman Ring titled, "Inbreeding: Challenging the Myths in Animals and (Gasp)…Humans." Beginning in 1966, Humphries has bred many champion Doberman Pinschers under the "Bikila" prefix (named after the great Ethiopian marathon runner, Abebe Bikila) in Australia and the United States. He began writing regular articles in a column titled "Dogs on Parade" for The Sun-Herald in Australia in the early 1970s, and for 40 years has written articles in American magazines including the Doberman Quarterly, the Doberman World, the Doberman Ring, and the Doberman Pinscher Magazine, on the genesis and history of the Doberman breed; genetics, science and diseases; breeding in general; and humorous observations of the dog show world.

== Personal life ==
On 24 April 1976, Humphries married Lynne Blumentritt, an American sports and television writer he met on his WCT invitation tour to Dallas in 1975. His wife was also a writer/researcher on the Australian version of This Is Your Life. She later became an attorney and is a founding partner of the Houston law firm, Allen Boone Humphries Robinson LLP. Lynne Humphries was recognised as International Little League Volunteer of the Year in 1995, which earned her recognition in the Little League Hall of Fame in Williamsport, Pennsylvania. They are both long-time cancer survivors and live in Richmond, a historical small town on the outskirts of Houston, Texas, and at Stone Canyon in the Tortolita Mountains outside of Tucson, Arizona. They have three sons: Scott, a Harvard Law School honours graduate who is one of America's high-profile securities attorneys; Mark, who has his PhD in French literature from the University of Connecticut and has been a college professor at Wesleyan University in Connecticut; and Justin, who graduated magna cum laude from Columbia University in New York and gained his MBA at George Washington University, both achieved after he completed a nine-year professional baseball career.

Humphries was granted American citizenship on 18 May 2021. On 26 May, the Texas Legislature passed Resolution 1346, "Congratulating Australian-born sports journalist and author Rod Humphries on becoming a U.S. Citizen". A Texas state flag was flown in his honour over the Capitol in Austin on 24 June.

== Published works ==
=== Books ===
- Little League to the Major Leagues – A Complete Guide to Baseball’s Assembly Line. With Contributions from Scipio Spinks, Sid Holland and Justin Humphries. iUniverse, a subsidiary of Penguin, Bloomington, Indiana, 2013). ISBN 978-1-4759- 8469-9 (hard cover), ISBN 978-1-4759-8470-5 (soft), ISBN 978-1-4759-8468-2 (e-book).
- The Doberman Pinscher – Brains and Beauty. With Joanna Walker. Howell Book House, Wiley Publishing, Hoboken, New Jersey 1999). ISBN 0-87605-216-2 (hard cover), ISBN 0470252847 (e-book).
- Love and Faults: Personalities Who Have Changed the History of Tennis in My Lifetime. Ted Tinling with Rod Humphries, Crown, New York, 1979) ISBN 0-517-53305-7
- Lionel Rose: Australian- The Life Story of a Champion. Lionel Rose as told to Rod Humphries, Angus and Robertson, Sydney, Australia, 1969. National Library of Australia, registry No. 69-321. SBN 207 95146 2

=== Selected articles ===
- "Hitler was Just Not in the Race". Interview with iconic 1936 Berlin Olympic sprint champion, Jesse Owens. (Rod Humphries, Days of Glory column, The Sun-Herald, Sydney, 15 February 1976, page 64).
- "How to Race Horses and Win. Interview with Jesse Owens." (Rod Humphries, Inside Sport column, The Sydney Morning Herald, Australia, 11 February 1976, page 25).
- "Crusty Cosell Makes Exit With All Guns Blazing." Humphries profiles controversial television commentator Howard Cosell whom he worked alongside at a number of sports events. (Rod Humphries, Stateside column, The Australian, Sydney, 16 December 1985).
- "Dandy Don Meredith". Interview with the former Dallas Cowboy quarterback and Monday Night Football television partner of Howard Cosell. (Rod Humphries, Inside Sport column, The Sydney Morning Herald, 4 August 1976, page 27).
- "Rocky Marciano Pays a Visit: Still Shaping Well". Interview with former undefeated world heavyweight champion Rocky Marciano. (Rod Humphries, Sydney Morning Herald, 30 July 1966, page 21).
- "Ingemar’s Tennis Credentials Looked Clearly on the Nose." Former World Heavyweight boxing champion Ingemar Johansson seeks media credentials at Florida tennis tournament (Rod Humphries. Stateside column, The Australian, Sydney, 24 February 1986, page 17)
- "Coloured Satellite Launched. Mr. T…I Hope He’s Not Reading This!" Humphries writes on Mr. T (Laurence Tureaud) when he was a bodyguard for Leon Spinks, four years before he played James "Clubber" Lang alongside Sylvester Stallone in Rocky III (Rod Humphries Writes from New Orleans, The Sun-Herald, Sydney, 17 September 1978, page 90).
- "Smokin’ Joe Says a Word or Two...or Three, or Four". Interview with former world heavyweight champion Joe Frazier, The Sydney Morning Herald, 18 February 1975, page 14).
- "Down in Dixie, You’re a Football Fan or a Heretic. The South Has Risen Again through its College Football Teams". (Rod Humphries, Stateside Column, The Weekend Australian, Sydney, 6–7 January 1990, page 34).
- "President’s Men Try to Put Humpty together Again. The big business that is college football…and Australian Soccer. Captain Johnny Warren sees his first college football game". (Rod Humphries, Stateside Column, The Australian, Sydney, 15 July 1985, page 17).
- "Transylvanian Mesmerizes Gymnastics". A profile/interview with international gymnastics guru, Bela Karolyi, in Houston. (Rod Humphries, Stateside column, The Australian, Sydney, 15 August 1988).
- "We’re All Loyal to the Heroes of Our Youth". (Rod Humphries, Stateside Column, The Australian, Sydney, 13 July 1987, page 29).
- " ‘Hick from French Lick’; White Star in Black Man's Game". Larry Byrd profile. (Rod Humphries, Stateside Column, The Australian, Sydney, 16 June 1986, page 21).
- "When Jordan Takes Flight, The Air is His Special Playground". Michael Jordan profile. (Rod Humphries, Stateside Column, The Australian, Sydney, 27 April 1987, page 23)
- "Magic and the Birdman Bounce NBA into Prime Time". The positive impact of Magic Johnson and Larry Byrd on the NBA. (Rod Humphries, The Australian, Sydney, 11 November 1990, page 25).
- "Bo Jackson is a 10 in Any Sport He Wants to Play". Bo Jackson NFL/MLB star profile. (Rod Humphries, Stateside column, The Australian, Sydney, 10 February 1986, page 19).
- "Gone Are the Cowboys. JR for President!" Humphries looks at the famous TV Series, "Dallas." (Rod Humphries, Dallas File column, Sydney Morning Herald, 4 August 1980, page 6).
- "On the Ins and Outs of Cricket. A whimsical look at the basics of cricket". (Rod Humphries Writes column, The Sun-Herald, Australia, 3 August 1975, page 68).
- "Why Didn’t They Let It Rest in Peace?" A light-hearted look at "The Ashes," the symbol of England versus Australia in cricket. (Rod Humphries Writes column, 'The Sun-Herald', Sydney, 2 January 1977, page 37).
- "The Thorny Issue of a Wilted Rose". The demise of baseball great Pete Rose who admitted to betting on baseball games while managing. (Rod Humphries, Stateside column, The Australian, Sydney, 3 July 1989).
- "No Elation in Business." Interview with famous American jockey Bill Hartack, the winner of a record five Kentucky Derbies (Rod Humphries, the Sydney Morning Herald, Australia, 2 July 1976, page 15).
- "Little Miss Cool Keeps Her Cool". Interview with Chris Evert (Rod Humphries, The Sydney Morning Herald, Australia, 15 December 1973 page 63).
- "The Czech That Bounces". Interview with Martina Navratilova (Rod Humphries, Inside Sport column, The Sydney Morning Herald, Australia, 1 December 1976, page 21).
- "Tennis’ Pure Rivalry Has Born Respect and Friendship". Humphries writes of Round 71 in Houston of the rivalry between Chris Evert and Martina Navratilova. (Rod Humphries in Houston, Stateside Column, The Australian, Sydney, 4 May 1987, page 25).
- "Maria Still Has That Charisma". Interview with three-time Wimbledon champion, Maria Bueno of Brazil. (Rod Humphries, The Sydney Morning Herald, Australia, 23 November 1976, page 13).
- "Kip is a Household Name". Interview with Olympic gold medal runner, Kenya's Kipchoge Keino. (Rod Humphries, Inside Sport column, The Sydney Morning Herald, Sydney, 20 October 1976, page 17).
- "Man, I Just Do the Fighting, Gil There Does the Worrying". Interview in Harlem, New York, with legendary dual world boxing champion Emile Griffith. (Rod Humphries in New York, Sydney Morning Herald, Australia, 17 October 1973, page 21).
- "U.S. Fighter Gravely Ill After Knockout". Humphries was front-row ringside when 22-year-old Cleveland fighter Chuck Wilburn suffered a brain haemorrhage and died after a fight in Sydney (Rod Humphries, Sydney Morning Herald, Australia, 2 April 1976, front page).
- "Rod Humphries on Arthur Ashe". Humphries profiles his friend Arthur Ashe after he beat Jimmy Connors in the 1975 Wimbledon final. (Rod Humphries, Inside Sport column, The Sydney Morning Herald, Australia, 9 July 1975, page 15).
- "Harada-San…Eternal Hero". Interview with Japanese world flyweight and bantamweight boxing champion, Masahiko "Fighting" Harada. (Rod Humphries, Inside Sport column, Sydney Morning Herald, Australia, 17 September 1975, page 27).
- "Beauty and Fashion in the Fast Lane". A profile of Delorez Florence Griffith- Joyner, Olympic sprint champion. (Rod Humphries, Stateside column, The Australian, Sydney, 25 July 1988).
- "Jackie Traces Footsteps of Great Babe". Humphries makes a prediction before Jackie Joyner-Kersee's Olympic success in 1988. (Rod Humphries, Stateside column, The Australian, Sydney, 5 October 1987, page 21).
- "A Stranger in Paradise". Humphries writes from Puerto Rico on the country and its famous athletes. (Rod Humphries, The Sun-Herald, Sydney, 25 February 1979, page 79).
- "Little Saint with a Big Punch". The story of Trevor King, a Salvation Army minister and former world ranked fighter who gave the eulogy at the funeral of his father, Jack Humphries (Rod Humphries, Days of Glory column, the Sun-Herald, Sydney, 21 November 1976, page 71).
- "Sport in the German Democratic Republic". A four-part series of interviews with communist East German officials about the Olympic success. (Rod Humphries, The Sydney Morning Herald, Australia, August 12,17,18,20, 1976; 12 August page 23; 17 August, page 13; 18 August, page 25; and 20 August, page 12).
- "Warming Up for Another ‘Mind Bender’ ". Interview with Hall of Fame long distance swimmer Des Renford. (Rod Humphries, The Sydney Morning Herald, Australia, 11 May 1974, page 79).
- "Renford Challenge". In Dallas, Hall of Fame long-distance swimmer Des Renford challenges Dianna Nyad to race him from Cuba to Florida (Rod Humphries Writes column, The Sun-Herald, Sydney, 3 June 1979, page 86).
- "Whatever Happened to Gorgeous George? A light hearted look at professional wrestling". (Rod Humphries, The Sun-Herald, Sydney, 22 June 1975, page 54).
- "Rose Says He ‘Did Not Feel Right’ To Fight". Lionel Rose loses world boxing title to Ruben Olivares in Los Angeles. (Rod Humphries in Los Angeles, The Sun-Herald, Sydney, 24 August 1969, page 76).
- "What’s Happened to Lionel Rose?" Three-part series. (Rod Humphries, Sydney Morning Herald, Australia, 2, 3, 4 March 1971, 2 March page 21; 3 March, page 19; 4 March, page 33).
- "Title Bid Fails, but Rose to Fight On." Humphries on Lionel Rose's failed world title bid in Japan. (Rod Humphries from Hiroshima, Sydney Morning Herald, Australia, 31 May 1971).
- "Evonne Wants to Fly – So Did Lionel Rose". Humphries looks at the lives and careers of Australia's two Aboriginal world sports champions, boxer Lionel Rose and tennis queen, Evonne Goolagong. (Rod Humphries Writes column, The Sun-Herald, Sydney, 6 July 1975, page 59).
- "Football Knocks Can Dull the Brain". An early look at brain damage in football. (Rod Humphries, The Sydney Morning Herald, Sydney, 25 April 1974, page 11).
- "Good News and Bad News for Lovers of American Football. Introduction of instant television replays." (Rod Humphries, Stateside Column, The Australian, 24 March 1986, page 19).
- "Wrong ‘Speed’ Brings Down Bullet Bob". The "world’s fastest human", Bob Hayes, Olympic sprint champion and Dallas Cowboy football player, celebrated at Texas Stadium in Dallas while under guard after being imprisoned for drug possession. (Rod Humphries from Dallas, The Sun-Herald, Sydney, 4 November 1979, page 95).
- "The ‘Bomber’ at 65 – an Idol in a Wheelchair". A birthday party with a twinge of sadness for former heavyweight champion, the "Brown Bomber," Joe Louis. (Rod Humphries in Dallas, The Sun-Herald, 20 May 1979, page 124).
- "The Best Cricket Team in the Past 30 Years. How the Public Voted". (Rod Humphries, Inside Sport column, The Sydney Morning Herald, Australia, 1 January 1976, page18).
- "The Second Coming of John McEnroe". John McEnroe Senior talks to Rod Humphries about his son's comeback. (Rod Humphries, Stateside Column, The Australian, Sydney, 25 April 1988, page 23).
- "Nasty –Yes, But My Friend Ilie was Real Tennis Genius". A profile of Ilie Nastase. (Rod Humphries, Stateside column, The Australian, Sydney, 16 September 1985).
- "For Swimming – the Dawn of a New Era". Interview with Dawn Fraser, 100 meters world record holder and one of only three swimmers to win gold medals in the same event in three straight Olympics. (Rod Humphries, Days of Glory column, The Sun-Herald, Sydney, 11 January 1976, page 54).
- "Golden Girl Who Came Back". Interview with Betty Cuthbert, Olympic 100 metres sprint champion in 1956 who won the 400 metres Olympic gold in Tokyo eight years later. (Rod Humphries, Days of Glory column, The Sun-Herald, Sydney, 7 December 1975, page 94).
- " ‘Not to Worry Bill, it’s a Beautiful Night.’ " Interview with Jimmy Carruthers, Australia’s first world boxing champion. (Rod Humphries, Days of Glory column, The Sun-Herald, Sydney, 25 January 1976, page 55).
- "Hope for Gold Not Tarnished". Interview with Olympic swimming gold medal winner Kevin Berry who was also a photographer at the Sydney Morning Herald and Sun-Herald. (Rod Humphries, Days of Glory column, The Sun-Herald, Sydney, 7 November 1976, page 67).
- "A Whole New World of Life After Death: The Process of Freeze-Drying of Pets…and Beyond". (Rod Humphries Writes, The Doberman Pinscher Magazine, Volume 2, Issue 1, 2008, pages 52–57)
- "U.S. Showring Handling is Big Business". (Rod Humphries, Dogs on Parade column, Sun-Herald newspaper, Sydney, 30 December 1973, page 54).
- "Here’s Why Greyhounds Run So Fast". (Rod Humphries, Dogs on Parade column, The Sun-Herald, Sydney, 26 August 1973, page 90).
- "The Last Great Dog Show: Send in the Clones". Humorous look at cloning of animals which could lead to demise of dog shows. (Rod Humphries Writes, The Doberman Quarterly, Volume 24, Issue 2, Summer 1991, pages 100–102).
- "Nice Dog, Pretty Bitch". A light hearted look at the vernacular of the dog show world. (Rod Humphries Writes, Doberman Quarterly, Volume 25, No 1, Spring 1992, pages 110–111)
