= James Collingwood Tinling =

James Collingwood Burdett Tinling (24 March 1900 – 1983) was an ex-RAF officer who joined with Rolf Dudley-Williams and Frank Whittle in 1936 to set up Power Jets Ltd, which manufactured the world's first working jet engine.

Tinling was born in Eastbourne, the son of James Alexander Tinling, a chartered accountant. He was educated at St Cyprian's School and Radley College. Tinling joined the Royal Air Force, but was invalided out following a flying accident in the early 1930s. He joined Dudley-Williams and Whittle in 1936 to develop Whittle's expired patent for a jet engine. Tinling, Whittle and Dudley-Williams shared 49% of the new company, with 51% held by the investment bankers OT Falk and Partners, which also provided loan finance. The company, Power Jets, was based at a factory in Rugby, Warwickshire belonging to British Thomson-Houston, a steam turbine company. The prototype jet engine was first run on 12 April 1937.

Tinling married Eileen Nancy Edols on 22 December 1939, at St George's, Hanover Square. He became chairman of Power Jets in 1941, replacing Lance Whyte, and its prototype Gloster E28/39 first flew on 15 May 1941. Power Jets Ltd. was later bought by the British government, and Tinling remained on the board.

Tinling died in late 1983 in Kent, survived by his wife. They are both buried in Benenden. He was the brother of Ted Tinling, the sports fashion designer.
