= When Billie Beat Bobby =

2001 television film directed by Jane Anderson

- Written by: Jane Anderson
- Directed by: Jane Anderson
- Starring: Holly Hunter; Ron Silver; Matt Letscher; Bob Gunton; Jacqueline McKenzie; Elizabeth Berridge; Fred Willard
- Music by: Brian Kirk
- Country of origin: United States
- Original language: English

Production
- Executive producers: Peter Sussman; Ed Gernon; Goldie Hawn; Teri Schwartz
- Producer: Diana Kerew
- Cinematography: Paul Elliott
- Editor: Nancy Richardson
- Running time: 90 minutes
- Production companies: Alliance Atlantis; Cherry Alley Productions

Original release
- Network: ABC
- Release: April 16, 2001

When Billie Beat Bobby is a 2001 American sports comedy drama television film written and directed by Jane Anderson that details the historic 1973 "Battle of the Sexes" tennis match between Billie Jean King and Bobby Riggs and what led up to it. It stars Holly Hunter as King and Ron Silver as Riggs, and aired on ABC on April 16, 2001. The match was filmed at the Great Western Forum in Inglewood, California.

At the 53rd Primetime Emmy Awards, Hunter was nominated for Outstanding Lead Actress in a Miniseries or Movie but lost out to Judy Davis who won for Life with Judy Garland: Me and My Shadows.

== Cast ==
- Holly Hunter as Billie Jean King
- Ron Silver as Bobby Riggs
- Matt Letscher as Lawrence King
- Bob Gunton as Jerry Perenchio
- Jacqueline McKenzie as Margaret Court
- Elizabeth Berridge as Rosie Casals
- Fred Willard as Howard Cosell
- Caitlin Martin as Chris Evert
- Vincent Van Patten as Lornie Kuhle
- Patrick Kerr as Rheo
- Sal Viscuso as Sports Writer Mike
- Stockard Channing as Narrator (uncredited)
- Rainn Wilson as Dennis Van De Meer

== Production ==
Principal photography began from 6 November 2000 to 6 December 2000.

== See also ==
- Battle of the Sexes (2017 film)
- List of television films produced for American Broadcasting Company
