= Duncan Falconer =

British author and Special Boat Service commando (born 1956)

- Born: London, England
- Military career
- Allegiance: United Kingdom
- Branch: Royal Navy
- Service years: 12 years
- Unit: Special Boat Service
- Conflicts: The Troubles
- Other work: Author, Novelist

Duncan Falconer is the pseudonym of an author and former Special Boat Service commando. As a child, he was raised in an orphanage in North London before being adopted by a family from Battersea.

== Military career ==
Falconer joined the British Royal Marines at the age of 18. At 19 years of age, he attended SBS selection in Poole Dorset and was one of nine Marines to successfully complete the course out of 147 men. Most candidates are required to serve some time in a commando unit before applying, however Duncan was given an exception. This was due to many SBS operatives leaving to instead work as deep sea divers in the North Sea for the lucrative salaries. The SBS briefly allowed recruits from CTCRM to apply for selection before serving the usual minimum time in a commando unit. Later he was posted to 42 Commando as a career broadening opportunity.

Falconer served the majority of his military service with the SBS. During his time in the military, he also served with the SAS, and 14 Intelligence Detachment, deployed to Northern Ireland with each for one year and two and a half years respectively. After he left the Detachment he took a sabbatical for a year before returning to the SBS where he was posted to MAT ("Maritime Anti-Terrorism") operations in which he was involved in a number of exercises retaking oil rigs and tankers.

== After the SBS ==
After leaving the SBS Falconer spent two years working for a private security company.

Falconer had planned to move to Central America, to specialise in kidnap and ransom negotiation work, but, whilst in Los Angeles he wrote his first screenplay which he sold weeks later. As a result, Falconer chose to remain in LA for more than a decade whilst pursuing two careers – one as a screenplay writer, the other as a private security risk consultant. He also spent several years working as a bartender while writing screenplays and TV. Whilst living in LA, Falconer also wrote his autobiography.

After September 11 attacks Falconer returned to the UK and joined a private security company based in Hereford. There he worked as a hostile environment instructor and security consultant for journalists, operating in many countries including Africa, the Middle East, Asia and South America.

His autobiography, and first literary publication, First into Action included accounts of the actions carried out by the SBS and 14 Intelligence Detachment. The tone of this work was in contrast to a number of biographies of other ex-special forces personnel at the time – the tales not just about the heroic actions of those he served alongside, but also showed the more humorous, realistic side of the troops. The book also highlighted the rivalry and antagonism between the Special Boat Service and Special Air Service and the history behind their conflict.

Such was the success of the book, that Time Warner publishing contracted Falconer to write two military-based novels. The protagonist in these initial novels was John Stratton, created in the author's image and sharing a similar career path within the military, as an SBS operative and operating with an Intelligence Detachment in Northern Ireland. The vast majority of his work to date has retained Stratton as the central character. In The Protector Falconer introduced a new central character, Bernie Mallory. Mallory again has been crafted in the image of his creator, this time as a former Royal Marine turned private security contractor.

Falconer moved to South Africa, then Dubai where he consulted on 'fuel and food' convoy moves across Afghanistan. Falconer moved back to Europe and also South Africa where he is a maritime and crisis management consultant for a UK-based security company.

Falconer continues to write books and screenplays. In 2017 the film Stratton, based on the main character of his books, was released. It stars Dominic Cooper as Stratton as well as Connie Nielsen, Derek Jacobi and Thomas Kretschmann.

== Bibliography ==
=== Non-fiction ===
- First into Action: Dramatic Personal Account of Life Inside the SBS (2001)

=== Fiction ===
- Stratton series:
  1. The Hostage (2003)
  2. The Hijack (2004)
  3. The Operative (2006)
  4. Undersea Prison (2008)
  5. Mercenary (2009)
  6. Traitor (2010)
  7. Pirate (2012)
  8. Assassin (2013)
- The Protector (2007)
- The Becket Approval (2019)
