= The Hating Game =

2021 American film directed by Peter Hutchings

- Theatrical release poster
- Directed by: Peter Hutchings
- Screenplay by: Christina Mengert
- Based on: The Hating Game by Sally Thorne
- Produced by: Claude Dal Farra; Brian Keady; Brice Dal Farra; Santosh Govindaraju; Dan Reardon
- Starring: Lucy Hale; Austin Stowell; Damon Daunno; Sakina Jaffrey; Corbin Bernsen
- Cinematography: Noah Greenberg
- Edited by: Jason Nicholson
- Music by: Spencer Hutchings
- Production companies: Convergent Media; BCDF Pictures; Mister Smith Entertainment; Federal Films; Big Indie Pictures
- Distributed by: Vertical Entertainment
- Release date: December 10, 2021
- Running time: 102 minutes
- Country: United States
- Language: English
- Box office: $294,625

The Hating Game is a 2021 American romantic comedy film directed by Peter Hutchings. It is based on the novel of the same name by Sally Thorne, and stars Lucy Hale and Austin Stowell in the lead roles.

Complete opposites Lucy and Josh must work closely when their companies merge, and they are soon competing for the same promotion, but a growing mutual attraction complicates matters and may jeopardize Lucy's success.

The film was released in theaters and video on demand on December 10, 2021, by Vertical Entertainment. It received generally positive reviews from critics.

== Plot ==
Lucy and Josh share an office, both working as assistant managers for joint-CEOs after their respective publishing companies merged. Complete opposites in every way, they seemingly despise each other. Resorting to petty psychological games, Lucy moves objects aligned on neat-freak Josh's desk, and Josh mocks Lucy for being a "people pleaser" who allows subordinates to miss deadlines. Lucy has an MA in Literature, but Josh, a Harvard MBA, has ruthlessly reduced the workforce by 35%. Rivalry deepens when they compete for the same promotion. Realizing neither wants to work under the other, they make a bet: whoever does not get the job will quit.

Their head games increasingly reveal that they watch each other constantly. After Lucy has a disturbing sex dream featuring Josh, she dresses in a provocatively short "little black dress" to get a reaction, possibly throwing him off his game. Observing her lack of social life outside of work, Josh mocks her for being dressed for a "hot date". Mortified at having her bluff challenged, she responds that she has a date at a local bar with a fellow office worker. When a skeptical Josh comments that he will be there that night and will likely see them, Lucy quickly lines up a date with co-worker Danny. As Lucy and Josh leave the office, verbal sparring and sexual tension culminate in a passionate kiss in the elevator. Josh offers to drive her home, but Lucy reminds him that she has a date and sarcastically congratulates him on his head games making her doubt herself. Affable Danny asks Lucy about the vibes he notices between her and Josh, but she denies any attraction. Josh sends Lucy flowers with an ambiguous note as an apology for the inappropriate elevator kiss and argument, but Lucy mistakes the flowers as being from Danny.

At a company team-building paintball event a few days later, Lucy collapses due to a fever. Josh takes her home, notes her high fever, and brings his physician brother, Pat, to treat her. Lucy overhears Pat encouraging the reluctant Josh to bring a plus-one for his upcoming wedding; she later offers to accompany Josh to pay him back. Josh asks her to resolve any attraction to Danny first, as he does not want to complicate their already contentious relationship with a fleeting sexual fling.

After confirming a lack of chemistry with Danny, Lucy shows up at Josh's apartment, and they kiss and begin to exchange confidences. He reveals that his parents are both doctors; his strained relationship with his father after dropping out of medical school; and his brother always being favored. Lucy leads him to bed, expressing the need to work out their sexual tension so they can focus on their jobs. Josh pulls away; confused, she accuses him of still playing games. He responds that she's playing games.

Josh shows up at Lucy's apartment to take her to the wedding, reminding her that she owes him; she begrudgingly goes along. The reservation at an overbooked inn has been botched, so Josh and Lucy share a room. They finally succumb to attraction and have sex.

At the wedding reception, Pat's bride, Mindy, comments to Lucy that things worked out for the best, since Mindy and Josh were never a good match. When Lucy asks Josh why she is there, he replies that she has made the day easier for him. He was devastated when Mindy left him after a year for his brother. After Josh's father belittles him for choosing unimportant work, Lucy responds with how important Josh is to a publishing firm, contributing to culture. Back at home, Josh confesses that he loves her and explains that he wants more than a brief fling. He offers to start a real relationship with her and forget about their bet.

The next day, Lucy overhears and misinterprets a conversation between Josh and his boss, concluding that he has used their romance to distract her from the promotion. Enraged, she vows to beat Josh for the job. On the day of the promotion competition, Lucy gets the job; Josh has already quit for a higher-level job at another publishing firm. They kiss and become a couple.

== Cast ==
- Lucy Hale as Lucy Hutton
- Austin Stowell as Joshua "Josh" Templeman
- Damon Daunno as Danny
- Yasha Jackson as Julie
- Sakina Jaffrey as Helene
- Corbin Bernsen as Richard Bexley
- Nicholas Baroudi as Patrick "Pat" Templeman
- Tania Asnes as Annabelle
- Brock Yurich as Mack
- Sean Cullen as Anthony
- Kathryn Boswell as Mindy

== Production ==
The film was announced in May 2019, with Lucy Hale and Robbie Amell cast as the lead roles. On November 10, 2020, Austin Stowell was cast, as Amell dropped out due to a scheduling conflict. Filming began on November 21 in Saugerties, NY during the COVID-19 pandemic, with a couple of days of filming in New York City, and concluded on December 23.

== Release ==
In July 2021, Vertical Entertainment acquired distribution rights to the film.

== Reception ==
The Hating Game had a limited theatrical release on December 10, 2021. It was also available to stream on various VOD platforms. On the review aggregator website Rotten Tomatoes, 68% of 28 critics' reviews are positive. The website's consensus reads: "The Hating Game's dismayingly retrograde approach to the battle of the sexes is often offset by the sparkling chemistry between its well-matched leads." Multiple articles praised the chemistry of the two leads.
