= Larry King (tennis) =

American sports executive (1945–2026)

- Born: Lawrence William King; January 30, 1945; Dayton, Ohio, U.S.
- Died: May 29, 2026 (aged 81); Grass Valley, California, U.S.
- Occupation: Attorney from University of California/Sports Promoter
- Known for: Founder of World Team Tennis
- Spouses: Billie Jean King (m. 1965; div. 1987) Nancy Bolger (m. 1990)
- Children: 2

Lawrence William King (January 30, 1945 – May 29, 2026) was an American sports promoter.

== Early life and education ==
King was born in Dayton, Ohio, and raised in Eagle Rock, California. He met Billie Jean Moffitt at California State University, Los Angeles, in 1963, when he played on one of the school's best men's tennis teams, coached by Scotty Deeds. He married Billie Jean on September 17, 1965, in her hometown of Long Beach, California.

== Career ==
In 1973, along with Dennis Murphy, Jordan Kaiser, and Fred Barman, King developed the concept of World Team Tennis, and started the league the following year. In 1974, King and Billie Jean co-founded and began publishing WomenSports magazine.

In 1976, King invented a smokeless ashtray, called The Clean Air King. In 1984, Billie Jean became the major owner of World Team Tennis.

King and Dennis Murphy also founded Roller Hockey International, a professional hockey league that operated from 1993 to 1999. Previously, Murphy had also been instrumental in the founding of the American Basketball Association and the World Hockey Association.

King, a director and master duplicate bridge player, founded the Money Bridge tour. He also founded Bridge University to promote bridge throughout the country.

== Marriage, personal life and death ==
King had a significant effect on his first wife's rise to fame. Billie Jean King was not always a feminist icon; in the 1960s he encouraged her to start thinking about the lack of sports scholarships for women. He never tried to tear down Billie Jean's aspiration to become a tennis superstar, and promoted her success continuously.

In 1971, Billie Jean King had an abortion that was made public in a Ms. magazine article. Larry had revealed Billie Jean's abortion without consulting her.

In 1973, Billie Jean defeated Bobby Riggs in a well-publicized match. In 2017, the film Battle of the Sexes was released. In the film, King was shown as becoming aware, that year, of Billie Jean's infidelity with another woman, and decided to ignore it; King said that was false.

Billie Jean King had an affair with her former secretary, Marilyn Barnett, during Larry and Billie Jean's marriage. In 1981, Billie Jean admitted publicly that the relationship had taken place, in response to a lawsuit by Barnett that asked for palimony. King and Billie Jean divorced in 1987.

King lived in Grass Valley, California, with his wife. According to the film Battle of the Sexes, Billie Jean King and her partner Ilana Kloss are godparents to the Kings' children.

King died from prostate cancer on May 29, 2026, at the age of 81.
