= World number 1 ranked female tennis players =

World number 1 ranked female tennis players is a year-by-year listing of the female tennis players who were ranked as world No. 1 by various contemporary and modern sources.

Notes:

- The Women's Tennis Association introduced a computerized ranking system in November 1975, which is incorporated into this list.
- The International Tennis Federation's year-end number 1 classification that was introduced in 1978 is no longer named as such, and has evolved into the ITF World Champion designation and award.
- The Women's Tennis Association has awarded a WTA Player of the Year award each year since 1977.

== List of No. 1 ranked players ==
=== Pre-1920: National rankings; few sources available ===
Year	Sources and notes
1883	Maud Watson: The Pastime classification of British players.
1884	Maud Watson: The Pastime classification of British players.
1885	Maud Watson: The Pastime classification of British players.
1886	Maud Watson: The Pastime classification of British players.
1887	Lottie Dod: The Pastime classification of British players.
1888	Lottie Dod: The Pastime classification of British players.
1889	Lottie Dod: The Pastime classification of British players.
1890	Louisa Martin: The Pastime classification of British players.
1891	Lottie Dod: The Pastime classification of British players.
1892	Lottie Dod: The Pastime classification of British players.
1893	Lottie Dod: The Pastime classification of British players.
1894	Blanche Bingley: The Pastime classification of British players.
1895	Louisa Martin: The Pastime classification of British players.
1896	Blanche Bingley Hillyard, Louisa Martin: The Lawn Tennis classification of British players.
1897	Charlotte Cooper, Blanche Bingley Hillyard: The Lawn Tennis classification of British players.
1898	Charlotte Cooper: Lambert Chambers.; The Lawn Tennis classification of British players.
1899	Blanche Bingley Hillyard: Lambert Chambers.; Louisa Martin: Lambert Chambers.; The Lawn Tennis classification of British players.
1900	Blanche Bingley Hillyard: Lambert Chambers.; The Lawn Tennis classification of British players.
1901	Charlotte Cooper Sterry: Lambert Chambers.; The Lawn Tennis classification of British players.
1902	Muriel Robb: Lambert Chambers.; The Lawn Tennis and Croquet classification of British players.; Charlotte Cooper Sterry: Lambert Chambers.
1903	Dorothea Douglass: Lambert Chambers.; Louisa Martin: Lambert Chambers.; The Lawn Tennis and Croquet classification of British players.; German international rankings.
1904	Dorothea Douglass: Lambert Chambers.; The Lawn Tennis classification of British players.; The Lawn Tennis and Badminton classification of British players.
1905	May Sutton: The Lawn Tennis and Badminton classification of British players and the American and Australian visitor.
1906	Dorothea Douglass: The Lawn Tennis and Badminton classification of British players and the American and Australian visitors.; German international rankings.
1909	May Sutton: The Lawn Tennis and Badminton classification of British players and the American and Australian visitor.

=== 1921–1967: The Amateur Era ===
Year	No. 1 player	Sources and notes
1921	Suzanne Lenglen (FRA)	Lenglen: A. Wallis Myers, The Daily Telegraph (London).; B. H. Liddell Hart.
1922	Suzanne Lenglen (FRA)	Lenglen: A. Wallis Myers, The Daily Telegraph (London).
1923	Suzanne Lenglen (FRA)	Lenglen: A. Wallis Myers, The Daily Telegraph (London).; B. H. Liddell Hart.
1924	Suzanne Lenglen (FRA)	Lenglen: A. Wallis Myers, The Daily Telegraph (London).
1925	Suzanne Lenglen (FRA)	Lenglen: A. Wallis Myers, Daily Mail (London).; Bill Tilden.
1926	Suzanne Lenglen (FRA)	Lenglen: A. Wallis Myers, Daily Mail (London).
1927	Helen Wills (USA)	Wills: A. Wallis Myers, Daily Mail (London).; Bill Tilden.; American Lawn Tennis.
1928	Helen Wills (USA)	Wills: A. Wallis Myers, Daily Mail (London).
1929	Helen Wills (USA)	Wills: A. Wallis Myers, Daily Mail (London).; F. Gordon Lowe.
1930	Helen Wills Moody (USA)	Wills Moody: A. Wallis Myers, Daily Mail (London).; Pierre Gillou, president of the French Tennis Federation.; Jean Samazeuilh.; Bill Tilden.
1931	Helen Wills Moody (USA)	Wills Moody: A. Wallis Myers, Daily Mail (London).; Pierre Gillou.; Didler Pioline, L'Auto.; Bill Tilden.
1932	Helen Wills Moody (USA)	Wills Moody: A. Wallis Myers, Daily Mail (London).; Pierre Gillou.; Bill Tilden.
1933	Helen Wills Moody (USA)	Wills Moody: A. Wallis Myers, Daily Mail (London).; Pierre Gillou.; Jacobs: Herald-Tribune.
1934	Helen Jacobs (USA) Dorothy Round (UK)	Jacobs: Ned Potter, American Lawn Tennis.; Round: A. Wallis Myers, Daily Mail (London).; Pierre Gillou.
1935	Helen Wills Moody (USA)	Moody: A. Wallis Myers, Daily Mail (London).; S. Wallis Merrihew.; Ned Potter, American Lawn Tennis.; Pierre Gillou.; The Times
1936	Helen Jacobs (USA) Hilde Krahwinkel Sperling (DEN)	Jacobs: A. Wallis Myers, Daily Mail (London).; Pierre Gillou.; Fred Perry.; Harry Hopman.; Mervyn Weston.; The Times.; Krahwinkel Sperling: Ned Potter, American Lawn Tennis.
1937	Anita Lizana (CHI); Dorothy Round (UK)	Lizana: A. Wallis Myers, Daily Mail (London).; Ned Potter, American Lawn Tennis.; Round: Pierre Gillou.; Mervyn Weston.; The Times.; Harry Hopman.; Alfred Chave, The Telegraph (Brisbane).
1938	Helen Wills Moody (USA)	Wills Moody: A. Wallis Myers, Daily Mail (London).; Ned Potter, American Lawn Tennis.; Pierre Goldschmidt, L'Auto.; Pierre Gillou.; Mervyn Weston, The Argus (Melbourne).; "International", The Referee.; F. Gordon Lowe.; The Times.; G. H. McElhone.; Alfred Chave, The Telegraph (Brisbane).
1939	Alice Marble (USA)	Marble: Ned Potter, American Lawn Tennis.; American Lawn Tennis.; Gordon Lowe.; Pierre Gillou.; G. H. McElhone.; The Times.; Alfred Chave, The Telegraph (Brisbane)
1940– 1945	none (World War II)	The United States Lawn Tennis Association continued to rank U.S. players during the war years: Alice Marble (1940).; Sarah Palfrey Cooke (1941 and 1945).; Pauline Betz (1942, 1943, and 1944).
1946	Pauline Betz (USA)	Betz: Ned Potter, American Lawn Tennis.; Pierre Gillou.; Harry Hopman.
1947	Louise Brough (USA) Margaret Osborne duPont (USA)	Brough: Ned Potter, American Lawn Tennis.; Osborne duPont: John Olliff, Lawn Tennis Almanack.; Pierre Gillou.
1948	Louise Brough (USA) Margaret Osborne duPont (USA)	Brough: Pierre Gillou.; Osborne duPont: Ned Potter, American Lawn Tennis.; John Olliff, Lawn Tennis Almanack.
1949	Margaret Osborne duPont (USA)	Osborne duPont: Ned Potter, American Lawn Tennis.; Pierre Gillou.; John Olliff.; Harry Hopman.
1950	Margaret Osborne duPont (USA)	Osborne duPont: Ned Potter, American Lawn Tennis.; John Olliff, Lawn Tennis Almanack.
1951	Doris Hart (USA)	Hart: Ned Potter, American Lawn Tennis.; Pierre Gillou, Lawn Tennis Almanack.
1952	Maureen Connolly (USA)	Connolly: Ned Potter, American Lawn Tennis.; Lance Tingay, Daily Mail (London).
1953	Maureen Connolly (USA)	Connolly: Ned Potter, World Tennis.; Lance Tingay
1954	Maureen Connolly (USA)	Connolly: Ned Potter, World Tennis.; Lance Tingay, The Guardian (London).; Panel of 8 experts, The New York Times.
1955	Louise Brough (USA) Doris Hart (USA)	Brough: Lance Tingay; Hart: L'Équipe.; Ned Potter, World Tennis.
1956	Shirley Fry (USA)	Fry: Ned Potter, World Tennis.; Lance Tingay
1957	Althea Gibson (USA)	Gibson: Lance Tingay, The Daily Telegraph (London).; Ned Potter, World Tennis.; British Lawn Tennis reader's poll.
1958	Althea Gibson (USA)	Gibson: Lance Tingay; Ned Potter, World Tennis.; British Lawn Tennis reader's poll.
1959	Maria Bueno (BRA)	Bueno: Lance Tingay; Ned Potter, World Tennis.; British Lawn Tennis reader's poll.
1960	Maria Bueno (BRA)	Bueno: Lance Tingay, The Daily Telegraph (London).; Ned Potter, World Tennis.
1961	Darlene Hard (USA); Angela Mortimer (UK)	Hard: The Miami Herald.; Mortimer: Lance Tingay; Ned Potter, World Tennis.; British Lawn Tennis reader's poll.; Denis Lalanne, L'Équipe.
1962	Margaret Smith (AUS)	Smith: Lance Tingay, The Daily Telegraph (London).; Ned Potter, World Tennis.; British Lawn Tennis reader's poll.; Ulrich Kaiser, from a panel of 13 experts (unanimous).
1963	Margaret Smith (AUS)	Smith: Lance Tingay, The Daily Telegraph (London).; Ned Potter, World Tennis.; British Lawn Tennis reader's poll.; Ulrich Kaiser, from a panel of 13 experts (unanimous).
1964	Maria Bueno (BRA) Margaret Smith (AUS)	Bueno: Ned Potter, World Tennis.; British Lawn Tennis reader's poll.; Ulrich Kaiser, from a panel of 14 experts.; Smith: Lance Tingay, The Daily Telegraph (London).
1965	Margaret Court (AUS)	Court: Lance Tingay, The Daily Telegraph (London).; Ned Potter, World Tennis.; British Lawn Tennis reader's poll.; Sport za Rubezhom (Russia).; Ulrich Kaiser, from a panel of 16 experts (unanimous).
1966	Maria Bueno (BRA) Billie Jean King (USA)	Bueno: Bruce Walkley, Herald Sun (Melbourne, Australia).; British Lawn Tennis reader's poll.; King: Lance Tingay, The Daily Telegraph (London).; Joseph McCcauley, World Tennis.; Pierre de Thier, Belgium.; Sport In The USSR.
1967	Billie Jean King (USA)	King: Lance Tingay, The Daily Telegraph (London).; Joseph McCauley, World Tennis.; British Lawn Tennis reader's poll.; Ulrich Kaiser, from a panel of 13 experts (unanimous).

=== 1968–present: The Open Era ===
Year	No. 1 player	Sources and notes
1968	Billie Jean King (USA)	King: Bud Collins.; Lance Tingay, The Daily Telegraph (London).; Rino Tommasi.; Ulrich Kaiser, from a panel of 18 experts (unanimous).; Seagram's (panel of experts). (Note: including Alan Tengrove, Australian Sun News Pictorial; Joseph McCauley, World Tennis; Steve Snider, United Press International; Gerald Williams, London Daily Mail; Judith Elian, L'Équipe; George McCann, Australian Consolidated Press; Fred Tupper, New York Times); Joseph McCauley, World Tennis.; The Times
1969	Margaret Court (AUS)	Court: Bud Collins.; Joseph McCauley, World Tennis.; Lance Tingay, The Daily Telegraph (London).; Rino Tommasi.; Frank Rostron, Daily Express.
1970	Margaret Court (AUS)	Court: Bud Collins.; Joseph McCauley, World Tennis.; Judith Elian, L'Équipe.; Lance Tingay, The Daily Telegraph (London).; Mike Gibson (Wimbledon referee).; Rino Tommasi.; Rex Bellamy, The Times (London).; Tennis magazine (Germany).
1971	Evonne Goolagong (AUS) Billie Jean King (USA)	Goolagong: Joseph McCauley, World Tennis.; Lance Tingay, The Daily Telegraph (London).; Björn Hellberg, Tennis Tidning (Sweden).; Judith Elian, L'Équipe.; Rex Bellamy, The Times (London).; Rino Tommasi.; Frank Rostron.; King: Bud Collins, The Boston Globe.; Frank Rostron.
1972	Billie Jean King (USA)	King: Tennis magazine (U.S.).; Bud Collins.; John Barrett.; Lance Tingay, The Daily Telegraph (London).; Rino Tommasi.; Frank Rostron.; Neil Amdur, World Tennis.; Rex Bellamy, The Times (London).
1973	Margaret Court (AUS)	Court: Bud Collins.; John Barrett.; Lance Tingay, The Daily Telegraph (London).; Rino Tommasi.; Tennis magazine (U.S.).; International poll of 17 tennis writers (unanimous).; Rex Bellamy, The Times (London) and World Tennis.
1974	Chris Evert (USA) Billie Jean King (USA)	Evert: World Tennis.; Lance Tingay, The Daily Telegraph (London).; John Barrett.; Judith Elian, L'Équipe.; Rino Tommasi.; Tennis magazine (U.S.).; Rex Bellamy, The Times (London).; USTA.; King: Bud Collins.
1975	Chris Evert (USA)	Evert: WTA year-end No. 1.; Bud Collins.; John Barrett.; World Tennis.; Lance Tingay.; The Daily Telegraph (London).; Tennis magazine (U.S.).; Rino Tommasi.; Rex Bellamy, The Times (London).; (Chris Evert, for World Tennis.)
1976	Chris Evert (USA)	Evert: WTA year-end No. 1.; Bud Collins.; World Tennis.; Lance Tingay, The Daily Telegraph (London).; Tennis magazine (U.S.).; John Barrett.; Rino Tommasi.
1977	Chris Evert (USA) Virginia Wade (UK)	Evert: WTA year-end No. 1.; Bud Collins.; France Presse.; John Barrett, Financial Times (London); Judith Elian, L'Équipe.; Lance Tingay, World of Tennis.; Tennis magazine (U.S.).; Peter Bodo, Tennis magazine (U.S.).; Barry Lorge.; Rino Tommasi, Tennis Club (Rome).; Wataru Tsukagoshi, Tennis Japan.; World Tennis.; Wade: WTA Player of the Year.
1978	Chris Evert (USA) Martina Navratilova (USA)	Evert: ITF World Champion.; Tennis Magazine (Australia).; World Tennis.; John Barrett.; Joseph McCauley, Tennis Australia.; Tennis magazine (U.S.).; Rino Tommasi.; Navratilova: WTA year-end No. 1.; WTA Player of the Year.; Bud Collins.; Lance Tingay, World of Tennis.
1979	Chris Evert (USA) Martina Navratilova (USA)	Evert: Judith Elian, L'Équipe.; Navratilova: WTA year-end No. 1.; ITF World Champion.; WTA Player of the Year.; Jeffrey Bairstow and Peter Bodo, Tennis magazine (U.S.).; World Tennis.; Tennis magazine (U.S.).; Alan Trengrove, Tennis Magazine (Australia).; Bud Collins.; John Barrett, Financial Times (London).; Rino Tommasi, Tennis Club (Rome).; Joseph McCauley, Tennis Australia.; Wataru Tsukagoshi, Tennis Japan.; Lance Tingay, World of Tennis.
1980	Tracy Austin (USA) Chris Evert (USA)	Austin: WTA Player of the Year.; Evert: WTA year-end No. 1.; ITF World Champion.; John Barrett.; World Tennis.; Lance Tingay, World of Tennis.; Tennis magazine (U.S.).; Rino Tommasi.; Bud Collins.
1981	Tracy Austin (USA) Chris Evert (USA)	Austin: John Barrett, Financial Times (London).; Lance Tingay, World of Tennis.; Bud Collins.; Evert: WTA year-end No. 1.; ITF World Champion.; WTA Player of the Year.; Alexander McNab and Peter Bodo, Tennis magazine (U.S.).; World Tennis.; Alan Trengrove, Tennis Magazine (Australia).; Judith Elian, L'Équipe.; John Barrett, Financial Times (London).; Waturu Tsukagoshi, Tennis Japan.; Rino Tommasi, Tennis Club (Rome).
1982	Martina Navratilova (USA)	Navratilova: WTA year-end No. 1.; ITF World Champion.; WTA Player of the Year.; John Barrett, Financial Times (London).; Lance Tingay, World of Tennis.; World Tennis.; Tennis magazine (U.S.).; Rino Tommasi.; Bud Collins.
1983	Martina Navratilova (USA)	Navratilova: WTA year-end No. 1.; ITF World Champion.; WTA Player of the Year.; John Barrett, Financial Times (London).; World Tennis.; Tennis magazine (U.S.).; Lance Tingay, World of Tennis.; The Daily Telegraph (London).; Rino Tommasi.; Bud Collins.
1984	Martina Navratilova (USA)	Navratilova: WTA year-end No. 1.; ITF World Champion.; WTA Player of the Year.; John Barrett, Financial Times (London).; Lance Tingay, World of Tennis.; World Tennis.; Tennis magazine (U.S.).; Rino Tommasi.; Bud Collins.
1985	Martina Navratilova (USA)	Navratilova: WTA year-end No. 1.; ITF World Champion.; WTA Player of the Year.; John Barrett, Financial Times (London).; Lance Tingay, World of Tennis.; World Tennis.; Rino Tommasi.; Bud Collins.
1986	Martina Navratilova (USA)	Navratilova: WTA year-end No. 1.; ITF World Champion.; WTA Player of the Year.; John Barrett, Financial Times (London).; Lance Tingay, World of Tennis.; World Tennis.; Rino Tommasi.; Bud Collins.
1987	Steffi Graf (FRG) Martina Navratilova (USA)	Graf: WTA year-end No. 1.; ITF World Champion.; WTA Player of the Year.; John Barrett, Financial Times (London).; Lance Tingay, World of Tennis.; World Tennis.; Rino Tommasi.; Bud Collins.; Navratilova: Lance Tingay, World of Tennis.
1988	Steffi Graf (FRG)	Graf: WTA year-end No. 1.; ITF World Champion.; WTA Player of the Year.; John Barrett, Financial Times (London).; Lance Tingay, World of Tennis.; World Tennis.; Rino Tommasi.; Bud Collins.
1989	Steffi Graf (FRG)	Graf: WTA year-end No. 1.; ITF World Champion.; WTA Player of the Year.; John Barrett, Financial Times (London).; Lance Tingay, World of Tennis.; World Tennis.; Bud Collins.
1990	Steffi Graf (GER); Monica Seles (YUG)	Graf: WTA year-end No. 1.; ITF World Champion.; WTA Player of the Year.; John Barrett, Financial Times (London).; Seles: Bud Collins.; World Tennis.
1991	Monica Seles (YUG)	Seles: WTA year-end No. 1.; ITF World Champion.; WTA Player of the Year.; John Barrett, Financial Times (London).; Bud Collins.
1992	Monica Seles (YUG)	Seles: WTA year-end No. 1.; ITF World Champion.; WTA Player of the Year.; John Barrett, Financial Times (London).; Bud Collins.
1993	Steffi Graf (GER)	Graf: WTA year-end No. 1.; ITF World Champion.; WTA Player of the Year.; John Barrett, Financial Times (London).; Bud Collins.
1994	Steffi Graf (GER) Arantxa Sánchez Vicario (ESP)	Graf: WTA year-end No. 1.; WTA Player of the Year.; Sánchez Vicario: ITF World Champion.; John Barrett, Financial Times (London).; Bud Collins.
1995	Steffi Graf (GER) Monica Seles (USA)	Graf: WTA year-end No. 1.; ITF World Champion.; WTA Player of the Year.; John Barrett, Financial Times (London).; Bud Collins.; Seles: WTA year-end No. 1.
1996	Steffi Graf (GER)	Graf: WTA year-end No. 1.; ITF World Champion.; WTA Player of the Year.; John Barrett.; Bud Collins.
1997	Martina Hingis (SUI)	Hingis: WTA year-end No. 1.; ITF World Champion.; WTA Player of the Year.; John Barrett.
1998	Lindsay Davenport (USA)	Davenport: WTA year-end No. 1.; ITF World Champion.; WTA Player of the Year.; John Barrett.
1999	Lindsay Davenport (USA) Martina Hingis (SUI)	Davenport: WTA Player of the Year.; Hingis: WTA year-end No. 1.; ITF World Champion.; John Barrett.
2000	Martina Hingis (SUI) Venus Williams (USA)	Hingis: WTA year-end No. 1.; ITF World Champion.; V. Williams: WTA Player of the Year.
2001	Jennifer Capriati (USA) Lindsay Davenport (USA)	Capriati: ITF World Champion.; WTA Player of the Year.; Davenport: WTA year-end No. 1.
2002	Serena Williams (USA)	S. Williams: WTA year-end No. 1.; ITF World Champion.; WTA Player of the Year.
2003	Justine Henin (BEL)	Henin: WTA year-end No. 1.; ITF World Champion.; WTA Player of the Year.
2004	Lindsay Davenport (USA) Anastasia Myskina (RUS) Maria Sharapova (RUS)	Davenport: WTA year-end No. 1.; Myskina: ITF World Champion.; Sharapova: WTA Player of the Year.
2005	Kim Clijsters (BEL) Lindsay Davenport (USA)	Clijsters: ITF World Champion.; WTA Player of the Year.; Davenport: WTA year-end No. 1.
2006	Justine Henin (BEL) Amélie Mauresmo (FRA)	Henin: WTA year-end No. 1.; ITF World Champion.; Mauresmo: WTA Player of the Year.
2007	Justine Henin (BEL)	Henin: WTA year-end No. 1.; ITF World Champion.; WTA Player of the Year.
2008	Jelena Janković (SRB) Serena Williams (USA)	Janković: WTA year-end No. 1.; ITF World Champion.; S. Williams: WTA Player of the Year.
2009	Serena Williams (USA)	S. Williams: WTA year-end No. 1.; ITF World Champion.; WTA Player of the Year.
2010	Kim Clijsters (BEL) Caroline Wozniacki (DEN)	Clijsters: WTA Player of the Year.; Wozniacki: WTA year-end No. 1.; ITF World Champion.
2011	Petra Kvitová (CZE) Caroline Wozniacki (DEN)	Kvitová: ITF World Champion.; WTA Player of the Year.; Wozniacki: WTA year-end No. 1.
2012	Victoria Azarenka (BLR) Serena Williams (USA)	Azarenka: WTA year-end No. 1.; S. Williams: ITF World Champion.; WTA Player of the Year.
2013	Serena Williams (USA)	S. Williams: WTA year-end No. 1.; ITF World Champion.; WTA Player of the Year.
2014	Serena Williams (USA)	S. Williams: WTA year-end No. 1.; ITF World Champion.; WTA Player of the Year.
2015	Serena Williams (USA)	S. Williams: WTA year-end No. 1.; ITF World Champion.; WTA Player of the Year.
2016	Angelique Kerber (GER)	Kerber: WTA year-end No. 1.; ITF World Champion.; WTA Player of the Year.
2017	Simona Halep (ROM) Garbiñe Muguruza (ESP)	Halep: WTA year-end No. 1.; Muguruza: ITF World Champion.; WTA Player of the Year.
2018	Simona Halep (ROM)	Halep: WTA year-end No. 1.; WTA Player of the Year.; ITF World Champion.
2019	Ashleigh Barty (AUS)	Barty: WTA year-end No. 1.; WTA Player of the Year.; ITF World Champion.
2020	Ashleigh Barty (AUS) Sofia Kenin (USA)	Barty: WTA year-end No. 1.; Kenin: WTA Player of the Year.
2021	Ashleigh Barty (AUS)	Barty: WTA year-end No. 1.; WTA Player of the Year; ITF World Champion.
2022	Iga Świątek (POL)	Świątek: WTA year-end No. 1; WTA Player of the Year; ITF World Champion
2023	Aryna Sabalenka Iga Świątek (POL)	Sabalenka: ITF World Champion; Świątek: WTA year-end No. 1; WTA Player of the Year
2024	Aryna Sabalenka Iga Świątek (POL)	Sabalenka: WTA year-end No. 1; WTA Player of the Year; Świątek: ITF World Champion
2025	Aryna Sabalenka	Sabalenka: WTA year-end No. 1; WTA Player of the Year; ITF World Champion

== See also ==
- List of WTA number 1 ranked singles tennis players
- ITF World Champions
- Top ten ranked female tennis players
- Top ten ranked female tennis players (1921–1974)
- World number 1 ranked male tennis players
