= Battle of the Sexes (tennis) =

Intergender tennis matches

Battle of the Sexes I
- (Australia) Margaret Court vs. (United States) Bobby Riggs
Set	1	2
(Australia) Margaret Court	2	1
(United States) Bobby Riggs	6	6
- Date: May 13, 1973
- Location: Ramona, California

Battle of the Sexes II
- (United States) Billie Jean King vs. (United States) Bobby Riggs
Set	1	2	3
(United States) Billie Jean King	6	6	6
(United States) Bobby Riggs	4	3	3
- Date: September 20, 1973
- Location: Astrodome; Houston, Texas

Battle of the Sexes III
- (United States) Martina Navratilova vs. (United States) Jimmy Connors
Set	1	2
(United States) Martina Navratilova	5	2
(United States) Jimmy Connors	7	6
- Date: September 25, 1992
- Location: Caesars Palace; Las Vegas, Nevada

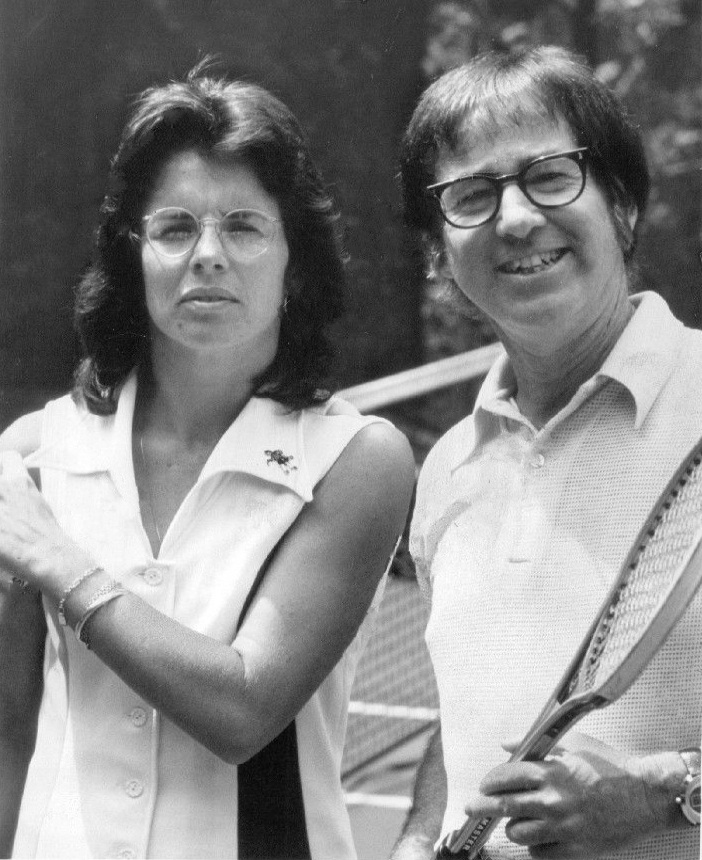
Billie Jean King & Bobby Riggs in 1973

In tennis, "Battle of the Sexes" describes various exhibition matches played between a man and a woman, or a doubles match between two men and two women in one case. The term is most famously used for an internationally televised match in 1973 held at the Houston Astrodome between 55-year-old Bobby Riggs and 29-year-old Billie Jean King, which King won in three sets. The match was viewed by an estimated fifty million people in the United States and ninety million worldwide. King's win is considered a milestone in public acceptance of women's tennis.

Two other matches commonly referred to as a "battle of the sexes" include one held four months earlier in 1973 between Riggs and Margaret Court over the best of three sets, and one in 1992 between Jimmy Connors and Martina Navratilova over the best of three sets, with hybrid rules favoring the female player dubbed "The Battle of Champions". These matches were won by Riggs and Connors, respectively.

At least eight other exhibition matches have been played between notable male and female tennis players starting in 1888, though only some of them were referred to at the time as a "battle of the sexes".

== 1973: Riggs vs. Court ==
Riggs had been one of the world's top male tennis players in the 1940s; he was ranked year-end number one three times and had won six major titles during his career, including three Wimbledon titles. After he retired from professional tennis in 1951, Riggs remained a master promoter of himself and of tennis. In 1973, he opined that the female game was inferior and that even at his current age of 55 he could still beat any of the top female players.

Riggs first challenged Billie Jean King, but when she declined, Margaret Court stepped in, accepting the guarantee of $20,000 for the match (equivalent to about $150,000 in 2025), more than she had earned for winning both the 1973 Australian and French Open women's singles titles. At the time, Court was 30 years old and had recently returned to tennis after giving birth to her first child in March 1972. She was in the midst of earning her seventh year-end ranking as number one female player in the world. On the day of their match on May 13, 5,000 fans came to the Mother's Day match in Ramona, California. Televised by CBS Sports, Riggs descended the stadium steps and presented Court with Mother's Day flowers, which she accepted while curtsying. Riggs used his drop shots and lobs to keep Court off balance. His quick victory (6–2, 6–1) landed Riggs on the cover of both Sports Illustrated and Time. This match would thus be dubbed the "Mother's Day Massacre" due to the drubbing.

== 1973: Riggs vs. King ==
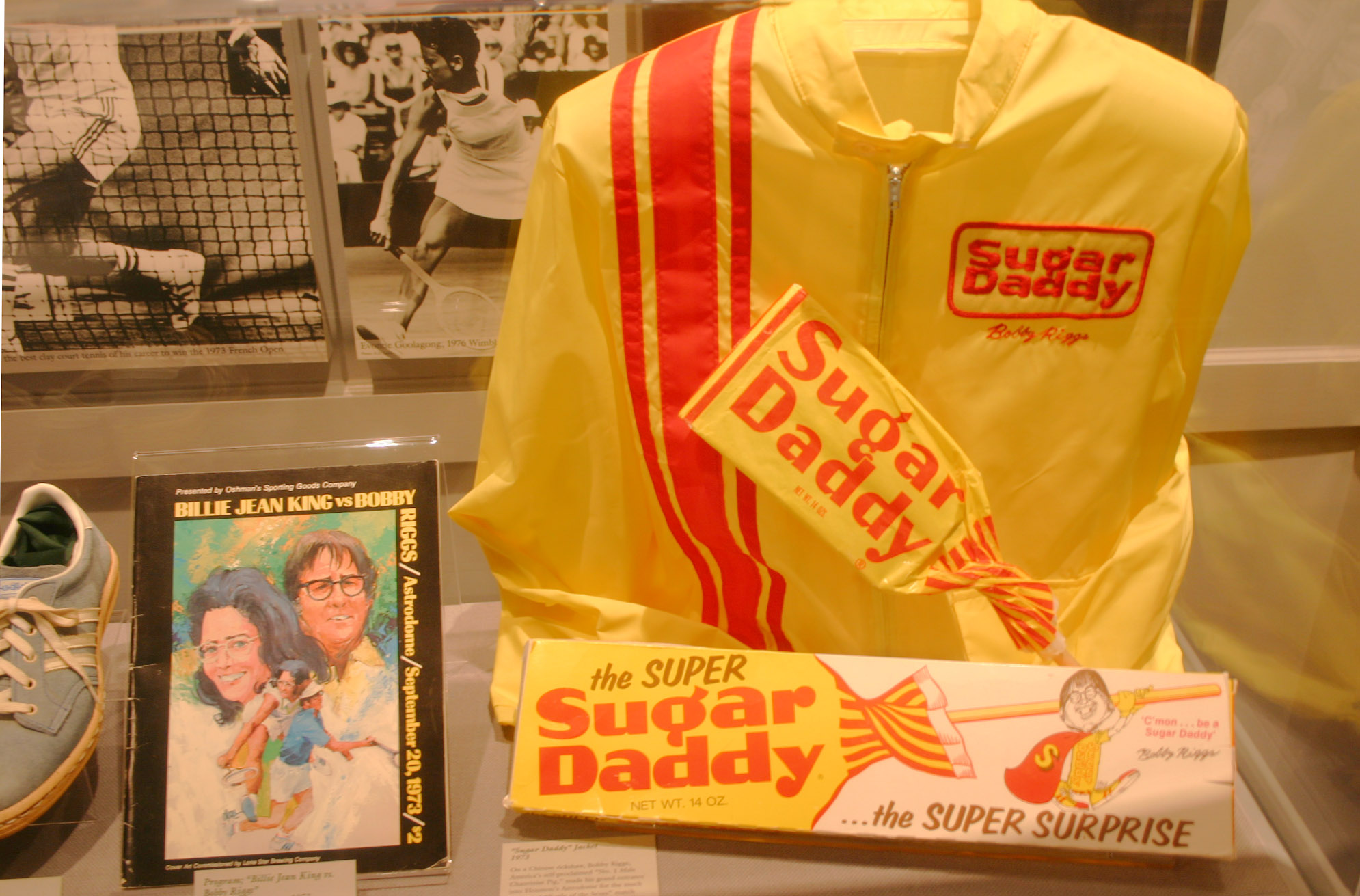
Paraphernalia from the Billie Jean King vs. Bobby Riggs match

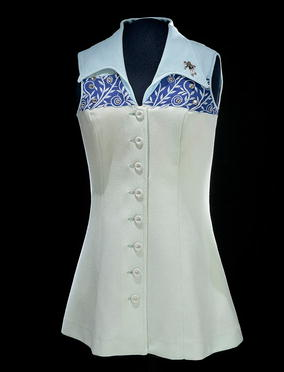
The dress worn by King during the match

Suddenly in the national limelight following his win over Court, Riggs taunted all female tennis players, prompting King to accept a lucrative financial offer to play Riggs in a nationally televised match in prime time on ABC that the promoters dubbed the "Battle of the Sexes". The match, which had a winner-takes-all prize of $100,000 (equivalent to about $730,000 in 2025), was held in Texas at the Houston Astrodome on Thursday, September 20, 1973.

Then 29-year-old King had earned her fifth year-end ranking as World No. 1 female player the previous year, and would finish second to Court in 1973.

King entered the court in the style of Cleopatra, on a feather-adorned litter carried by four bare-chested muscle men dressed in the style of ancient slaves. Riggs followed in a rickshaw drawn by a bevy of models. Riggs presented King with a giant Sugar Daddy lollipop, and she responded by giving him a squealing piglet, symbolic of male chauvinism. Riggs was given $50,000 (equivalent to about $360,000 in 2025) to wear a yellow Sugar Daddy jacket during the match, which he took off after three games. Riggs also placed many bets on and invested money in the match.

King, who also competed in the Virginia Slims of Houston tournament during the same week, won in straight sets, 6–4, 6–3, 6–3. In the first set, she fell behind 3–2 when Riggs broke her serve. In a 2015 interview, she said that most people do not remember that she was initially behind in the first set, and it looked bad for her in the early going. At this point, King realized that she "had to win" given the importance of the match, and broke right back and again in the tenth game to close out the set. She had learned from Court's loss and was ready for Riggs's game. Rather than playing her own usual aggressive game, King mostly stayed at the baseline, at least at first, easily handling Riggs's lobs and soft shots, making him cover the entire court as she ran him from side to side and beat him at his own defensive style of play. After quickly failing from the baseline, where he had intended to play, Riggs dropped his comedic affect and showed a more serious demeanor, as he was forced to change to a serve-and-volley game, but he was no match for King.

Some male critics were less impressed by King's victory, pointing to the fact that she was 26 years younger. Jack Kramer, who was against equal pay for women and offered a tournament in which the female winner got $1,500 while the male winner got $12,000, was one example. According to him, "I don't think Billie Jean played all that well. She hit a lot of short balls which Bobby could have taken advantage of had he been in shape. I would never take anything away from Billie Jean—because she was smart enough to prepare herself properly—but it might have been different if Riggs hadn't kept running around. It was more than one woman who took care of Bobby Riggs in Houston."

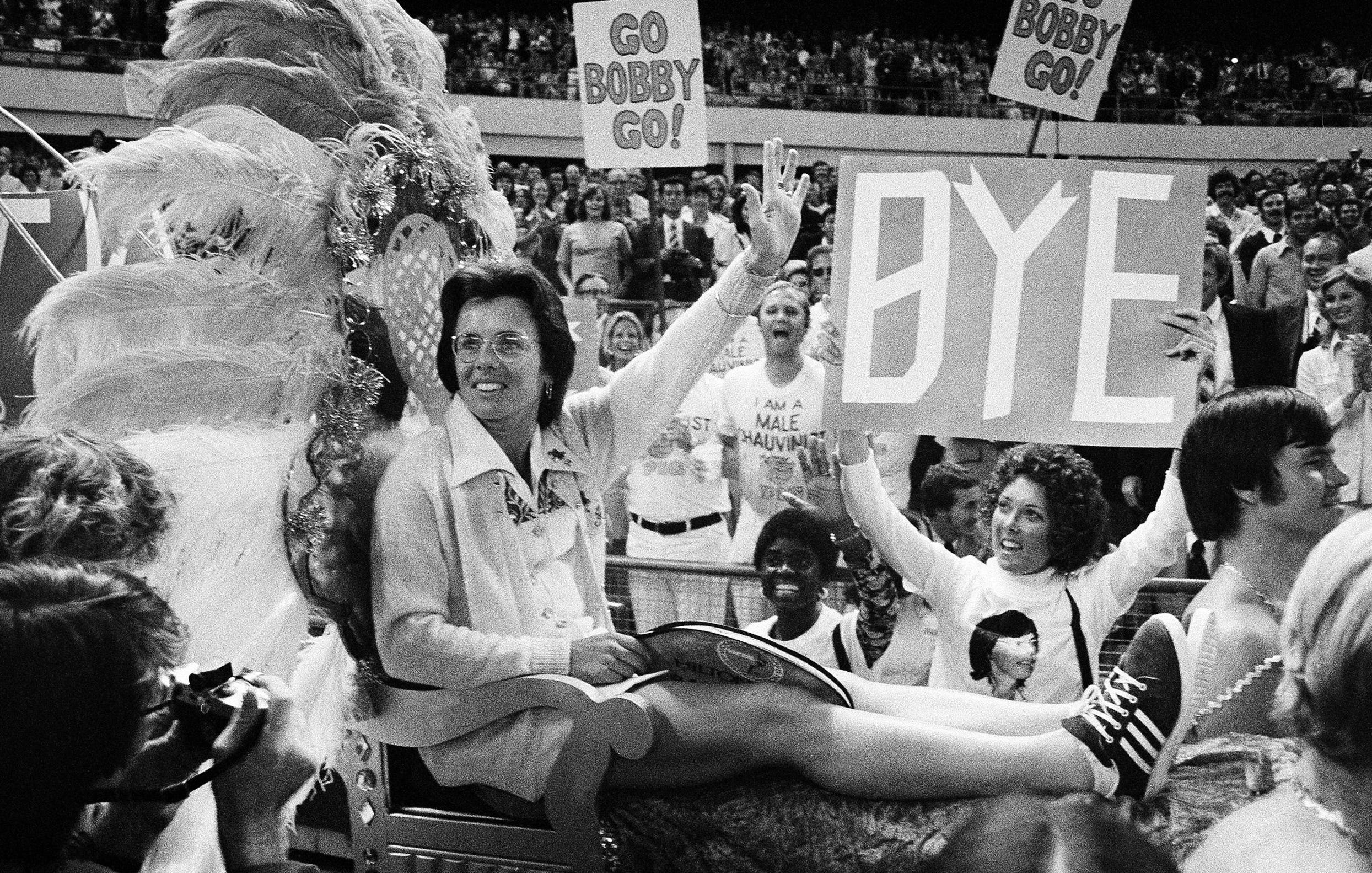
Billie Jean King being carried onto the court on a litter before the match

Another observer was impressed by King's brilliant play and smart tactics: "She both first-served aggressively and attacked Riggs' own softball deliveries with authority. She rushed to the net and commanded the territory by whipping stunning volleys off her backhand and by taking Riggs' infamous moon-shot lobs out of the Dome lights and rifling overheads right back past him. She varied pace on ground strokes, kept Riggs moving from corner to corner and played consistently to his weak backhand. She concentrated on hitting behind her opponent, wrong-footing him time and time again, then surprising him with some of his own beloved spin garbage. Everything worked...it was a brilliant rising to an occasion; a clutch performance under the most trying of circumstances. Seldom has there been a more classic example of a skilled athlete performing at peak efficiency in the most important moment of her life." Feminist media critic Susan Douglas later wrote "women like me screamed with delight in our living rooms, she not only vindicated female athletes and feminism but also inspired many of us to get in shape—not because it would make us beautiful but because it would make us strong and healthy".

The match had an audience of an estimated 50 million in the U.S. and 90 million worldwide. The attendance in the Houston Astrodome was 30,472; as of 2012, it remains the largest audience to see a tennis match in the United States.

=== ABC telecast ===
The broadcasters on the ABC telecast were Howard Cosell, Rosemary Casals and Gene Scott who replaced Kramer the night prior to the event. King had issued an ultimatum that she was going to withdraw from the match unless ABC dropped Kramer as a commentator. Her intention was to deny Kramer a platform to further disparage women's tennis. She said, "He doesn't believe in women's tennis. Why should he be part of this match? He doesn't believe in half of the match. I'm not playing. Either he goes— or I go."

Casals explained why she got the ABC assignment, "I was asked to do the color because I had been so negatively outspoken about Bobby Riggs and they wanted someone to go up against Jack Kramer, who was against women's tennis. They wanted a battle on and off the court." She added, "The producer encouraged me to 'go negative' on Bobby during the match." The network's attempt at a confrontation in the broadcast never materialized because of Scott's impartiality.

=== Allegations of match-throwing ===
There was some speculation that Riggs had deliberately lost the match. In 2013, National Public Radio aired an interview with Don Van Natta Jr., a senior writer with ESPN. According to Natta, one Hal Shaw was in the pro shop at the Palma Ceia Golf Club in Tampa when two known mobsters entered and proceeded to discuss a proposal from Riggs to win against Margaret Court, but deliberately lose to King, in settlement of a $100,000 gambling debt. The mobsters ultimately decided to accept that proposal. Shaw did not come forward about the matter at the time for fear of retribution by the mob. Per Riggs' son, Riggs did know quite a few mob leaders, and men related to the mob met with Riggs several times in the weeks leading up to the match with King. However, when these allegations were put to King, she was adamant that she knew what tanking a match looked and felt like, and Riggs did not tank the match.

Others speculated that Riggs deliberately lost based on his poor play and large number of unforced errors, in order to win large sums of money that he had bet against himself as a way to pay off his gambling debts. However, Riggs had a potential $1 million match against Chris Evert in the works if he won; furthermore, it was a winner-take-all match for the $100,000 prize. A headline at the time was "Women Ecstatic, Men Make Excuses." Riggs said afterwards that he underestimated Billie Jean King, who hit outright winners on 68% of her shots.

=== The effects of age ===
Martina Navratilova in 2023 stated that the reason the 55-year-old Riggs lost to the 29-year-old King was simply because of age. Navratilova said Riggs lost "because Bobby was too old," and added, "A 35 year old Bobby would have beaten all of us."

=== Effects on women's tennis ===
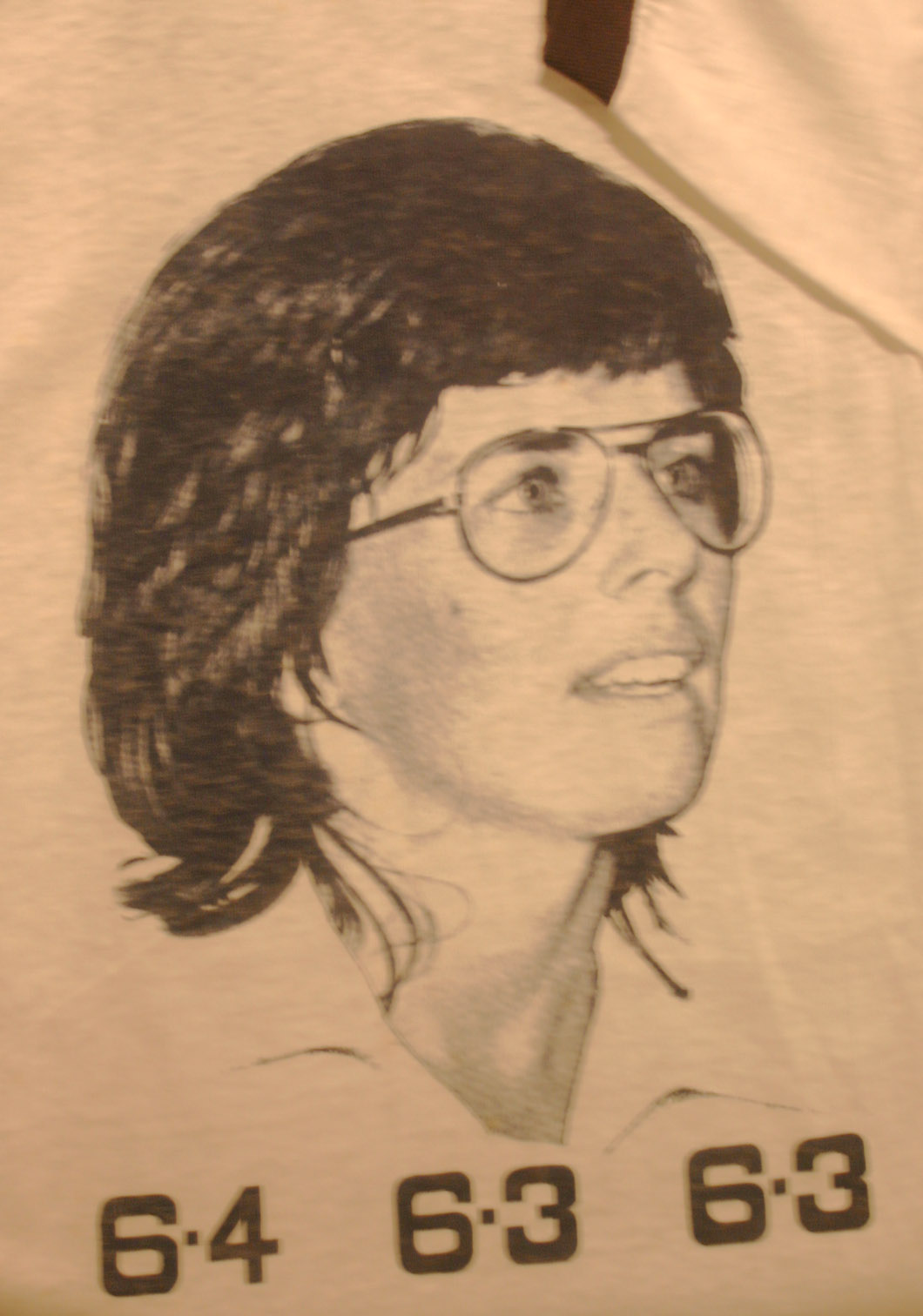
Portrait of Billie Jean King and the final match score over Bobby Riggs

King viewed the match as more than a publicity stunt, feeling that beating Riggs was important both for women's tennis and for the women's liberation movement as a whole. She said later, "I thought it would set us back 50 years if I didn't win that match. It would ruin the women's tour and affect all women's self-esteem." She believed that she had a destiny to work for sexual equality in sports.

King was part of the Original 9 players who formed the Virginia Slims Series, created because the women wanted to end inequality of pay between male and female victors. These nine women created their own tournaments and played wherever they could. Eventually this turned into the Women's Tennis Association (WTA).

=== In popular culture ===
A few months after their match, King and Riggs were guest stars in "The Pig Who Came to Dinner" episode of The Odd Couple, which originally aired on November 16, 1973.

In 2001, ABC aired a television film about the match between King and Riggs titled When Billie Beat Bobby, starring Holly Hunter and Ron Silver as King and Riggs, respectively.

In 2013, New Black Films released the documentary movie Battle of the Sexes in cinemas, with television broadcast following soon after. It was directed by James Erskine and Zara Hayes. The film was released on DVD in 2014.

The 2017 film Battle of the Sexes, directed by Jonathan Dayton and Valerie Faris, is about the King/Riggs match, and stars Emma Stone and Steve Carell as King and Riggs, respectively.

== 1992: Navratilova vs. Connors ==
Nineteen years later, a third "Battle of the Sexes" match, entitled Battle of Champions, was played in 1992. Outdoors at Caesars Palace in Paradise, Nevada, it matched 40-year-old Jimmy Connors and Martina Navratilova, age 35. Navratilova had previously turned down invitations to take on John McEnroe and Ilie Năstase, as she considered them undignified. The promoters initially tried to match Connors with the then top-ranked female player, Monica Seles. Connors called the match 'war'. Navratilova called it a battle of egos.

A pay-per-view telecast, the match was played on Friday night, September 25, under hybrid rules to make it more competitive; Connors was allowed only one serve per point, and Navratilova was allowed to hit into half of the doubles alleys. Each player received a $650,000 guarantee (about $1,490,000 currently), with a further $500,000 for the winner (about $1,150,000 currently). Connors won 7–5, 6–2, as Navratilova made eight double faults and 36 unforced errors. Connors, too, was nervous, and there was a rumor that he had placed a bet on himself to win at 4:1. According to Connors' book The Outsider, he placed a million-dollar bet that he would lose no more than eight games.

== Other matches of men against women ==
=== 1888: Ernest Renshaw vs. Lottie Dod ===
In 1888, the Wimbledon's men's champion, Ernest Renshaw, played a handicap match against the ladies' champion, Lottie Dod, where Dod was starting each game with a 30–0 advantage. The match was played in Exmouth, England, and ended with Renshaw's victory, 2–6, 7–5, 7–5. Under the same rules Dod also played Scottish champion Harry Grove, winning 1–6, 6–0, 6–4, and William Renshaw (Ernest's twin brother), whom she defeated in two sets, 6–2, 6–4.

=== 1922: Bill Tilden vs. Suzanne Lenglen ===
On May 27, 1921, Bill Tilden and Suzanne Lenglen played a match at Saint Cloud, France. It was only a single set, but Tilden prevailed 6–0. When later asked about the match, Lenglen said, "Someone won 6–0, but I don't recall who it was."

=== 1928–1933: Helen Wills vs. Bill Johnston, Edward Chandler, Phil Neer, and Elmer Griffin ===
In early 1928, Helen Wills played a series of matches against men. In losing, she took one set each from Bill Johnston and Edward Chandler, but was victorious over Elmer Griffin and Phil Neer. Bill Johnston was a prior Wimbledon and U.S. Champion and had lost in the finals at the U.S. Championships three years prior to their meeting. Edward Chandler had won the NCAA men's singles title in 1925 and 1926, played Davis Cup, and was ranked as high as No. 5 in the United States. Phil Neer won the NCAA men's singles title in 1921 and in 1932–1933 won the doubles event at the Pacific Coast Championships.

Phil Neer also played a two-set match against Helen Wills on January 28, 1933, in San Francisco. Neer had been ranked nationally as high as Number 8 and had occasionally played mixed doubles with Wills. Wills had won at Wimbledon the year prior. Though Neer was only 32, Wills won the match 6–3, 6–4.

=== 1936: Dorothy Round vs. H.W. "Bunny" Austin ===
The 1934 Wimbledon singles champion Dorothy Round played H.W. "Bunny" Austin (Wimbledon singles finalist in 1932) on July 31, 1936, at Jesmond Towers, Newcastle, England. The hard-fought match, played under a handicapping system (Round receiving 15 and Austin owing 30) was abandoned as a one-set-all draw, Round winning the first set 7–5 and Austin the second, 8–6.

Round v. Austin / Newcastle 1936
(United Kingdom) Dorothy Round	7	6
(United Kingdom) Bunny Austin	5	8

=== 1939: Alice Marble vs. Cyril Kemp ===
Alice Marble (USA), one of the best players of her day, came to Dublin in 1939 to compete in the Irish Championships at Fitzwilliam Lawn Tennis Club and during her stay played an exhibition match against leading Irish tennis player Cyril Kemp. Marble won the hard-fought match 9–7, 8–6. A full account of the match can be found in the Irish Times edition of 14 July 1939.

Marble won 18 major championships in her career: five in singles (including 4 US Championships), six in women's doubles, and seven in mixed doubles. In the week before her appearance in Dublin, she had become the first woman of the century to win the Triple Crown at Wimbledon: the Mixed Doubles (with Bobby Riggs, US), the Ladies' Doubles (with Sarah Palfrey, US), and the Ladies' Singles titles. She was ranked world No. 1 in 1939.

Kemp was a tennis player of significant accomplishment, including making 9 Davis Cup appearances for Ireland from 1946 to 1952, and winning the Men's Singles Open Irish championships in 1950.

=== 1975: ATP Tour ===
In 1975, Ion Tiriac defeated Abigail Maynard 6–0, 6–0 in their round one match at the then coed men's pro circuit (later renamed ATP Tour) of USTA's Fairfield County International Tennis Championship.

Maynard v. Țiriac / Connecticut 1975
(United States) Abigail Maynard	0	0
(Romania) Ion Țiriac	6	6

=== 1975: Challenge of the Sexes ===
On October 26, 1975, a Challenge of the Sexes event was held in Mission Viejo, California, televised on CBS. It involved male and female athletes from various sports, such as Laura Baugh and Jane Blalock vs. Hale Irwin and Doug Sanders in golf, and Jerry West vs. Karen Logan in basketball. The tennis event pitted future Wimbledon champion Virginia Wade vs. Björn Borg, and Ilie Nastase vs. Evonne Goolagong. The games had handicapped rules favoring the women where the men were limited to one serve and the women had the added area of the alleys for shot placement. Borg, Wade, and Goolagong entered the court in standard attire and demeanor, while Nastase entered wearing a dress. With Martina Navratilova also in the packed audience, Borg defeated Wade 6–3, but Goolagong defeated Nastase 7–5.

Wade v. Borg / California 1975
(United Kingdom) Virginia Wade	3
(Sweden) Björn Borg	6

Goolagong Cawley v. Nastase / California 1975
(Australia) Evonne Goolagong Cawley	7
(Romania) Ilie Năstase	5

=== 1985: Battle of the Sexes: The Challenge! (doubles) ===
On August 23, 1985, at age 67, Riggs returned to the tennis spotlight when he partnered with Vitas Gerulaitis, at the time a top-20 player, to launch another challenge to female players. He challenged Martina Navratilova and Pam Shriver to a doubles match. Navratilova said that she accepted because she believed she and Pam had no weaknesses when playing doubles, and that they were going to 'do a Billie' and win, especially given Riggs's age. The match took place at The Atlantic City Convention Hall in Atlantic City, New Jersey. Riggs's health had deteriorated somewhat from his last outing as he was now deaf in addition to his poor eyesight. Moreover, because Riggs was a finesse player and not a power player, the women expected that he would be easier to defeat than a retired power player. Riggs's return was short lived when the women won 6–3, 6–2, 6–4.

Mike Penner (of the Los Angeles Times) wrote: "The great misconception about 'The Challenge!' was that it might actually serve as a legitimate proving ground for the sexes." The sports writer went on to point out that there were things keeping this match from being seriously viewed as a legitimate challenge. "First, it was a doubles match, not a one-on-one competition. The strategy is different in doubles, weaknesses can be more easily masked and stamina is not nearly so critical a factor." Further, "Riggs amounted to a 67-year-old ball-and-chain shackled to the ankle of Gerulaitis. Riggs couldn't serve, couldn't return serves, couldn't hit overheads with any amount of force. Older than the combined ages of Navratilova and Shriver, Riggs was painfully out of place in this match. Even John McEnroe, on his finest day, would be an underdog against Navratilova and Shriver if Riggs were his partner."

Navratilova/Shriver v. Gerulaitis/Riggs / New Jersey 1985
(United States) Vitas Gerulaitis (United States) Bobby Riggs	3	2	4
(United States) Martina Navratilova (United States) Pam Shriver	6	6	6

=== 1998: Karsten Braasch vs. the Williams sisters ===
Another event dubbed a "Battle of the Sexes" took place during the 1998 Australian Open between Karsten Braasch and the Williams sisters. Venus and Serena Williams were aged 17 and 16 at the time and neither had yet won a Grand Slam tournament, but they claimed that they could beat any male player ranked outside the world's top 200. So Braasch, then ranked 203rd, challenged them both. He was 30 years old and was described by one journalist as "a man whose training regime centered around a pack of cigarettes and more than a couple of bottles of ice cold lager". The matches took place on court number 12 in Melbourne Park, after Braasch had finished a round of golf and two shandies, while Venus had just played (and lost) a regular Australian Open match against Lindsey Davenport.

Braasch first took on Serena and after leading 5–0, beat her 6–1. Venus was still giving her post-match press conference while her sister played, and only walked on court shortly before it was her turn to play him. Again Braasch was victorious, this time winning 6–2. Braasch said afterwards, "500 and above, no chance." He claimed that he had played like someone ranked 600th in order to keep the game "fun" and that the big difference was that men can chase down shots much more easily and put spin on the ball that female players could not handle. According to Braasch, the Williams sisters subsequently adjusted their claim to beating men outside the top 350.

S. Williams v. Braasch / Melbourne 1998
	(United States) Serena Williams	1
203	(Germany) Karsten Braasch	6

V. Williams v. Braasch / Melbourne 1998
	(United States) Venus Williams	2
203	(Germany) Karsten Braasch	6

=== 2003: Yannick Noah vs. Justine Henin ===
In December 2003, 43-year-old Yannick Noah and 21-year-old Justine Henin played a friendly match at the Forest National in Brussels. Noah donned a dress for much of the match. He played predominantly trick shots and slices and won 4–6, 6–4, 7–6.

Noah v. Henin / Brussels 2003
1	(Belgium) Justine Henin-Hardenne	6	4	6
	(France) Yannick Noah	4	6	7

=== 2013: Novak Djokovic vs. Li Na ===
In October 2013, Novak Djokovic and Li Na played a five game exhibition mini-set in Beijing, China, to commemorate the tenth anniversary of the China Open. During the match, Djokovic briefly swapped places with a ball boy. Li was given a 30–0 advantage at the start of each game and went on to win the mini set 3–2.

Li v. Djokovic / Beijing 2013
5	(China) Li Na	3
1	(Serbia) Novak Djokovic	2

=== 2017: Johanna Konta vs. Pat Cash ===
In November 2017, an exhibition match was held between 26-year-old female player Johanna Konta and 52-year-old retired male player Pat Cash, organized by the snack brand Nature Valley to celebrate the release of the film Battle of the Sexes the following week. It was held at the Westfield London shopping centre in London, England, on indoor carpet. One set was played, and Konta won 6–3.

Konta v. Cash / London 2017
9	(United Kingdom) Johanna Konta	6
	(Australia) Pat Cash	3

=== 2021: Hubert Hurkacz vs. Iga Świątek ===
In July 2021, a single tiebreak game was played between Polish number ones Hubert Hurkacz and Iga Świątek. This was as part of the opening celebrations for the 2021 WTA Poland Open, held in Gdynia. Świątek won the tiebreak 7–4.

Hurkacz v. Świątek / Gdynia 2021
(Poland) Hubert Hurkacz	0^{4}
(Poland) Iga Świątek	1^{7}

=== 2023: Mirra Andreeva vs. Yanis Ghazouani Durand ===
On 15–17 December 2023, an exhibition tournament was held in Bourg-de-Péage in France. The final of the women's draw was initially planned to be between Donna Vekić and the winner of Mirra Andreeva and Varvara Gracheva, but Vekic pulled out due to an injury. Ukrainian player Marta Kostyuk initially agreed to replace her, but she later changed her mind because of backlash in her home country against her playing Andreeva, who is Russian. In an unusual turn of events, the tournament directors asked ATP world no. 1145 Yanis Ghazouani Durand to play against 16-year-old WTA world no. 57 Andreeva. Ghazouani had lost to Arthur Rinderknech in a men's match two days before and was initially scheduled to be Andreeva's practice hitting partner before the women's final he ended up playing in. He won the match in straight sets, but Andreeva received the winner's trophy.

Andreeva v. Durand / Bourg-de-Péage 2023
Mirra Andreeva	5	2
(France) Yanis Ghazouani Durand	7	6

=== 2025: Aryna Sabalenka vs. Nick Kyrgios ===
An exhibition match between Belarusian Aryna Sabalenka (women's singles world No. 1) and Australian Nick Kyrgios (men's singles world No. 671), promoted as the "Battle of the Sexes", took place in Dubai at the indoor hardcourt of the Coca-Cola Arena on 28 December 2025.

The match was initially scheduled to be held in Hong Kong, but later was changed to Dubai.

It was played in the two traditional sets and, in case of a tie in sets, a match tiebreak finished in 10 points would be contested. The match featured a custom tennis court, with Sabalenka's side measuring 9% smaller than the standard dimensions of a professional court. According to the organisers Evolve, this was chosen due to match data showing that female players move 9% slower on average than men.

The organization of this event was widely criticized by fans, media and former tennis players such as Billie Jean King, stating it would deviate from the original purpose and could leave a bad impression for women's tennis and women's sports in general.

Despite this, Sabalenka denied those claims, saying she believed it would not damage women's sport.

"I am not putting myself at any risk. We're there to have fun and bring great tennis. Whoever wins, wins."

— Aryna Sabalenka

Kyrgios also denied those claims and stated he believed it would be great for the growth of the sport and saw it as something positive.

"I think [the match] shows unity."

"When men and women are now doing more of these things together, I think it's a sign that the sport is actually moving in a positive way,"

"I actually see it as a positive rather than how people are commenting on it."

— Nick Kyrgios

The match ended with Kyrgios winning in straight sets, 6–3 6–3. The match was criticised due to broadcast technical issues and a "flat atmosphere".

Sabalenka v. Kyrgios / Dubai 2025
Aryna Sabalenka	3	3
(Australia) Nick Kyrgios	6	6

== Unrealized proposals ==
In 2013, Andy Murray responded to a Twitter user who asked whether he would consider challenging Serena Williams, saying, "I'd be up for it. Why not?" Williams also reacted positively to the suggestion, remarking, "That would be fun. I doubt I'd win a point, but that would be fun."

In August 2015, John McEnroe was interviewed on Jimmy Kimmel Live!. At that time, McEnroe was 56 years old but still active on the seniors tennis circuit; Serena Williams was 34 years old and in the chase for a calendar-year Grand Slam. McEnroe mentioned to Kimmel that, about 15 years prior, Donald Trump had suggested that he would like to put together a battle-of-the-sexes match between McEnroe and Williams. McEnroe said he would face Williams but that Trump was not offering a big-enough payout. McEnroe said that he believed he could defeat Williams in a tennis match.
