= Tennis tour =

Type of tennis tournament

A tennis tour (or tennis circuit) is tennis played in tournament format at a series of venues – a tour – over during a set period of weeks or months. Professional tour tennis is played globally with one season consisting of one calendar year. Several tournaments are held each week as players win prize money and earn ranking points. A player's ranking determines her or his ability to enter a particular tournament, as tournaments vary in the amount money and points obtainable. Winning a tournament typically requires winning four to six matches in succession, generally a match a day, as play is single-loss elimination.

== Current professional tour tennis ==
Currently, professional male tennis players compete in one of three tours, while there are two tours for female pro players. The highest level of tour tennis is the ATP World Tour and the WTA Tour, for men and women respectively. The ATP World Tour is integrated with the second tier ATP Challenger Tour and the third tier Men's World Tennis Tour, as a single, unified global ranking system is kept, the ATP rankings. For women, a player's results on both the WTA Tour and Women's World Tennis Tour determine her WTA ranking.

Female players are free to play in events in either tour, although top-ranked players almost always play just in WTA Tour events. In fact, they are obliged to appear in certain of the most prestigious tournaments and in a certain number of these during the year or face being penalized by the tour. The same is true of male players. For singles tennis, both men and women ranked outside of the world top 40 or so and inside the top 180 or so will compete in both the top and second tier tour events. For male players, those ranked outside of the top 180 will then compete on both the ATP Challenger Tour and Men's World Tennis Tour, while most players ranked outside the top 400 or so must compete on the Men's World Tennis Tour. (A few players, despite their ranking, have a certain personal stature that allows them to be granted wild cards into tournaments. It may be that they were once ranked higher or have a certain level of fame, either globally or where the tournament is being held.)

A ranking cut-off is maintained that varies for each tournament - players ranked above the cut-off gain direct entry in that event's main draw while players ranked below it yet above a second cut-off gain entry into a qualifying tournament for the main draw. In singles tennis, such a player typically needs to win two or three qualifying matches to qualify for entry into the main draw. Matches are nearly always contested best two-of-three sets. Tiebreaks are the norm in deciding sets level at six games apiece. A typical tournament in any tier main draw for singles consists of 32 entrants, while the ATP 1000 events feature 58. For doubles, generally 16 teams compete and matches tied at one set each are settled by match tiebreaks. A few tournaments, notably the season-ending championship, feature round-robin play where players play initially in a mini-league instead of in the typical single-loss elimination. Generally in such events however, the final few rounds are still played in the typical knock-out format.

The ATP and WTA tours generally hold more than one tournament each week, while the ITF circuits, which oversees several events weekly, hold a few events during the month of December, the top tier tours' off-season.

== Former world tennis circuits ==
=== Men's ===
From 1914 to 1923 the new ILTF administered a tournament circuit for its then member national associations, at this point USNLTA administered its own circuit as did other national LTA's not members of the ILTF.

In 1924 the International Lawn Tennis Federation was given worldwide responsibility for controlling tennis after the United States LTA joined the organization, the main amateur tour was known as the ILTF World Circuit.

From 1926 Professional players competed on the Pro Tennis Tour. The Pro Tour offered endorsements, prize money, and expenses in opposition to the amateur ILTF World Circuit which did not offer prize money, but national associations did pay for travel and accommodation costs for their best players to enable them to compete in worldwide tournaments. Both of these circuits ran annually until 1967.

In late 1967 the International Lawn Tennis Association voted to allow professional players to compete on its circuit, that decision commenced in April 1968 this became known as the beginning of the Open Era.

From 1968 to 1969 there were three main circuits: the largest of which was the ILTF World Open Circuit, the National Tennis League tour administered by the National Tennis League, and WCT Circuit overseen by World Championship Tennis these were both professional circuits offering substantially more prize money.

In 1970 in response, the ILTF launched a new elite-level tour, the Grand Prix Circuit. The same year, the NTL Tour went into administration, leaving just the WCT Circuit as a competitor.

By 1973, computer rankings were established for singles tennis, with expansion to doubles tennis coming in the early 1980s.

By the mid 1980s, the ITF Grand Prix Circuit was the main men's tennis tour, while WCT Circuit events were in certain years even part of the Grand Prix. In 1990 both the Grand Prix circuit and the WCT circuit were replaced by a single worldwide ATP Tour, that was formed by absorbing the top tier events from the former circuits.

The Association of Tennis Professionals then took control of professional tour tennis from the Men's Tennis Council.

The second level tour administered by the ILTF was known as the Satellite Circuit starting in 1971. In 1976 the ATP began to introduce its own Challenger tournaments, initially were separate events that did not comprise a unified tour. By the mid 1980s, an ATP Challenger Circuit emerged.

In 1990 that circuit was renamed as the ATP Challenger Series and in 2008 its name was changed to the ATP Challenger Tour.

A third tier level of events, Futures tennis tournaments, was started by the ITF in the late 1990s. Over time these one-week events replaced satellite tournaments, a mini-circuit typically held over a four-week period at one location. By 2007, satellite events were entirely phased out on the ITF Men's Circuit.

=== Women's ===
The ILTF World Circuit was founded as a combined amateur men's and women's world wide tennis tour in 1913 following the creation of the International Lawn Tennis Federation, however the U.S. National Lawn Tennis Association administered its own USNLTA Circuit until it joined the ILTF in 1923, after the ILTF was granted rights to fully administer the main global tennis circuit ran annually until 1967. In April 1968 the International Lawn Tennis Federation allowed professional tennis players who had been competing on a separate Pro Tennis Tour (1927-1968) to compete on the same ILTF World Open Circuit with amateur players this event became known as the Open Era.

In 1971 a full women's only 19 tournament circuit began as Virginia Slims Circuit. In 1979 its name was changed to the Avon Championships Circuit until 1982. In 1983 it was unified with the Toyota circuit to form the Virginia Slims World Championship Series until 1989.

Also in 1971 as the ILTF Women's Grand Prix was administered by International Lawn Tennis Federation (ILTF). It consisted of top premier events of the ILTF World Circuit, and was a rival tour to the later Virginia Slims Circuit. By 1976 its final season it was known as ILTF Women's International Grand Prix.

In 1977 the last remaining ten events of the women's grand prix were absorbed into a new women's tour called the Colgate International Series (eventually becoming the Toyota International Series until 1982. In 1983 it was unified with the Toyota circuit to form a single unified tour the Virginia Slims World Championship Series until 1989.

1990 the former tennis circuit was rebranded and called the WTA World Tour.

== See also ==
- List of tennis tournaments
- Tennis pro tours
