= 1979 WTA Tour =

Women's tennis circuit

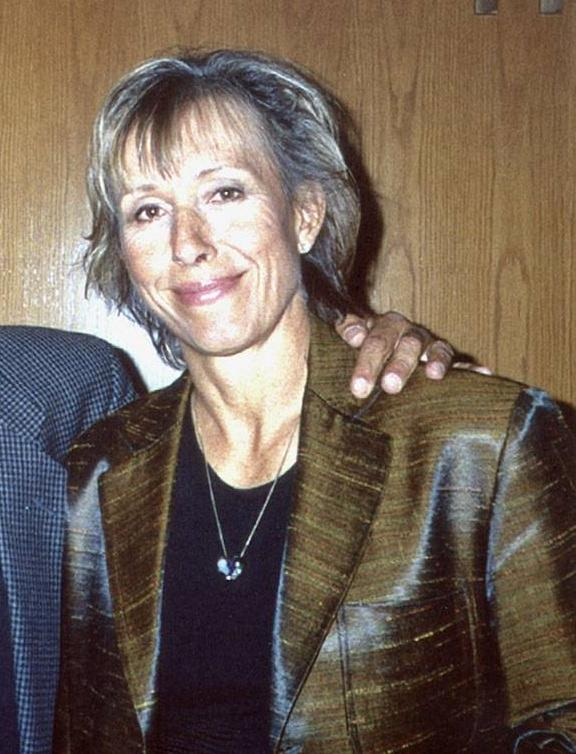
- Martina Navratilova finished the year as world No. 1 for the second time in her career. She won ten singles tournaments during the season, including a major at the Wimbledon Championships, as well as the Avon Championships.

Details
- Duration: 20 November 1978 – 8 January 1980
- Edition: 7th
- Tournaments: 57
- Categories: Grand Slam (4); WTA Championships (3); Avon Championships Circuit (11); Colgate Series (32); Non-tour events (5)

Achievements (singles)
- Most titles: (United States) Martina Navratilova (10)
- Most finals: (United States) Martina Navratilova (17)
- Prize money leader: (United States) Martina Navratilova ($618,698)
- Points leader: (United States) Martina Navratilova (15.748)

Awards
- Player of the year: (United States) Martina Navratilova
- Doubles team of the year: (United States) Billie Jean King (United States) Martina Navratilova
- Most improved player of the year: (West Germany) Sylvia Hanika
- Newcomer of the year: (United States) Kathy Jordan

The 1979 WTA Tour consisted of a number of tennis tournaments for female tennis players. It was composed of the newly streamlined version of the Avon Championships Circuit (which was now an 11-week tour of the US) and the remaining world wide Colgate Series Circuit. The year 1979 also saw the creation of the first official ranking system and these rankings were used to determine acceptance into the tournaments.

== Schedule ==
This is a calendar of all events which were part of either the Avon Championships circuit or the Colgate Series in the year 1979, with player progression documented from the quarterfinals stage. Also included are the Grand Slam tournaments, the 1979 Avon Championships, the 1979 Federation Cup and a number of events not affiliated with either tour.

Key

Grand Slam tournaments
Avon/Colgate Series championships
Avon Championships Circuit
Colgate Series
Non-tour events
Team events

=== November (1978) ===
Week	Tournament	Champions	Runners-up	Semifinalists	Quarterfinalists
20 Nov	Colgate International; Christchurch, New Zealand; Colgate Series (A); Grass – $35,000 – 48S/28D	(Czechoslovakia) Regina Maršíková; 6–2, 6–1	(West Germany) Sylvia Hanika	(United States) Lea Antonoplis (Sweden) Mimmi Wikstedt	(United Kingdom) Anne Hobbs (Japan) Naoko Sato (United States) Jane Stratton (Australia) Lesley Hunt
20 Nov	Colgate International; Christchurch, New Zealand; Colgate Series (A); Grass – $35,000 – 48S/28D	(Australia) Lesley Hunt (United States) Sharon Walsh; 6–1, 7–5	(West Germany) Katja Ebbinghaus (West Germany) Sylvia Hanika	(United States) Lea Antonoplis (Sweden) Mimmi Wikstedt	(United Kingdom) Anne Hobbs (Japan) Naoko Sato (United States) Jane Stratton (Australia) Lesley Hunt

=== December (1978) ===
Week	Tournament	Champions	Runners-up	Semifinalists	Quarterfinalists
4 Dec	Toyota Women's Classic; Sydney, Australia; Colgate Series (AA); Grass – $75,000 – 64S/32D	(Australia) Dianne Fromholtz; 6–1, 1–6, 6–4	(Australia) Kerry Reid	(United Kingdom) Virginia Wade (Australia) Wendy Turnbull	(Czechoslovakia) Regina Maršíková (Australia) Lesley Hunt (Czechoslovakia) Hana Mandlíková (Australia) Lesley Hunt
4 Dec	Toyota Women's Classic; Sydney, Australia; Colgate Series (AA); Grass – $75,000 – 64S/32D	(Australia) Kerry Reid (Australia) Wendy Turnbull; 6–2, 4–6, 6–2	(New Zealand) Judy Chaloner (United Kingdom) Anne Hobbs	(United Kingdom) Virginia Wade (Australia) Wendy Turnbull	(Czechoslovakia) Regina Maršíková (Australia) Lesley Hunt (Czechoslovakia) Hana Mandlíková (Australia) Lesley Hunt
11 Dec	Adelaide International; Adelaide, Australia; Colgate Series (AA); Grass – $50,000 – 64S/32D	(Australia) Kerry Reid; 7–5, 6–7, 6–1	(United States) Beth Norton	(Czechoslovakia) Hana Mandlíková (South Africa) Ilana Kloss	(Australia) Lesley Hunt (United Kingdom) Anne Hobbs (Australia) Chris O'Neil (Denmark) Birgitte Hermansen
11 Dec	Adelaide International; Adelaide, Australia; Colgate Series (AA); Grass – $50,000 – 64S/32D	(Australia) Lesley Hunt (United States) Sharon Walsh; 6–2, 6–2	(South Africa) Ilana Kloss (South Africa) Marise Kruger	(Czechoslovakia) Hana Mandlíková (South Africa) Ilana Kloss	(Australia) Lesley Hunt (United Kingdom) Anne Hobbs (Australia) Chris O'Neil (Denmark) Birgitte Hermansen
18 Dec	New South Wales Open; Sydney, Australia; Colgate Series (AA); Grass – $75,000 – 32S	(Australia) Dianne Fromholtz; 6–2, 7–5	(Australia) Wendy Turnbull	(Czechoslovakia) Renáta Tomanová (United States) Lea Antonoplis	(Australia) Lesley Hunt (South Africa) Ilana Kloss (United States) Sharon Walsh (Sweden) Elisabeth Ekblom
18 Dec	New South Wales Open; Sydney, Australia; Colgate Series (AA); Grass – $75,000 – 32S	(Australia) Lesley Hunt (United States) Sharon Walsh; 6–2, 6–1	(South Africa) Ilana Kloss (South Africa) Marise Kruger	(Czechoslovakia) Renáta Tomanová (United States) Lea Antonoplis	(Australia) Lesley Hunt (South Africa) Ilana Kloss (United States) Sharon Walsh (Sweden) Elisabeth Ekblom
25 Dec; 1 Jan	Australian Open; Melbourne, Australia; Grand Slam (A); Grass – 64S/32D; Singles – Doubles	(Australia) Chris O'Neil; 6–3, 7–6^{(7–3)}	(United States) Betsy Nagelsen	(Australia) Dianne Evers (Australia) Christine Matison	(United Kingdom) Sue Barker (Denmark) Dorte Ekner (Australia) Mary Sawyer (Czechoslovakia) Renáta Tomanová
25 Dec; 1 Jan	Australian Open; Melbourne, Australia; Grand Slam (A); Grass – 64S/32D; Singles – Doubles	(United States) Betsy Nagelsen (Czechoslovakia) Renáta Tomanová; 7–5, 6–2	(Japan) Naoko Sato (Australia) Pam Whytcross	(Australia) Dianne Evers (Australia) Christine Matison	(United Kingdom) Sue Barker (Denmark) Dorte Ekner (Australia) Mary Sawyer (Czechoslovakia) Renáta Tomanová

=== January ===
Week	Tournament	Champions	Runners-up	Semifinalists	Quarterfinalists
1 Jan	Avon Championships of Washington; Washington, United States; Avon Championships Circuit; Carpet (i) – $125,000 – 32S/16D	(United States) Tracy Austin; 6–3, 6–2	(United States) Martina Navratilova	(Australia) Dianne Fromholtz (South Africa) Ilana Kloss	(United States) Ann Kiyomura (United States) Pam Teeguarden (United States) Anne Smith (United States) Pam Shriver
1 Jan	Avon Championships of Washington; Washington, United States; Avon Championships Circuit; Carpet (i) – $125,000 – 32S/16D	(Socialist Federal Republic of Yugoslavia) Mima Jaušovec (Romania) Virginia Ruzici; 4–6, 6–2, 6–4	(United States) Renée Richards (United States) Sharon Walsh	(Australia) Dianne Fromholtz (South Africa) Ilana Kloss	(United States) Ann Kiyomura (United States) Pam Teeguarden (United States) Anne Smith (United States) Pam Shriver
8 Jan	Avon Championships of California; Oakland, United States; Avon Championships Circuit; Carpet (i) – $125,000 – 32S/16D	(United States) Martina Navratilova; 7–5, 7–5	(United States) Chris Evert	(United States) Ann Kiyomura (Australia) Dianne Fromholtz	(United States) Kathy May (Socialist Federal Republic of Yugoslavia) Mima Jaušovec (Romania) Virginia Ruzici (United States) Marita Redondo
8 Jan	Avon Championships of California; Oakland, United States; Avon Championships Circuit; Carpet (i) – $125,000 – 32S/16D	(United States) Chris Evert (United States) Rosie Casals; 3–6, 6–4, 6–3	(United States) Tracy Austin (Netherlands) Betty Stöve	(United States) Ann Kiyomura (Australia) Dianne Fromholtz	(United States) Kathy May (Socialist Federal Republic of Yugoslavia) Mima Jaušovec (Romania) Virginia Ruzici (United States) Marita Redondo
15 Jan	Avon Championships of Houston; Houston, United States; Avon Championships Circuit; Carpet (i) – $125,000 – 32S/16D	(United States) Martina Navratilova; 6–3, 6–2	(United Kingdom) Virginia Wade	(Australia) Dianne Fromholtz (Australia) Wendy Turnbull	(Romania) Virginia Ruzici (United States) Stacy Margolin (United States) Rosie Casals (United States) Kathy Jordan
15 Jan	Avon Championships of Houston; Houston, United States; Avon Championships Circuit; Carpet (i) – $125,000 – 32S/16D	(United States) Martina Navratilova (United States) Janet Newberry; 4–6, 6–4, 6–2	(United States) Pam Shriver (Netherlands) Betty Stöve	(Australia) Dianne Fromholtz (Australia) Wendy Turnbull	(Romania) Virginia Ruzici (United States) Stacy Margolin (United States) Rosie Casals (United States) Kathy Jordan
22 Jan	Avon Championships of Florida; Hollywood, United States; Avon Championships Circuit; Hard – $150,000 – 32S/16D	(South Africa) Greer Stevens; 6–4, 2–6, 6–4	(Australia) Dianne Fromholtz	(South Africa) Marise Kruger (United Kingdom) Virginia Wade	(United States) Carrie Meyer (United States) Terry Holladay (United Kingdom) Sue Barker (Romania) Virginia Ruzici
22 Jan	Avon Championships of Florida; Hollywood, United States; Avon Championships Circuit; Hard – $150,000 – 32S/16D	(United States) Tracy Austin (Netherlands) Betty Stöve; 6–2, 2–6, 6–2	(United States) Rosie Casals (Australia) Wendy Turnbull	(South Africa) Marise Kruger (United Kingdom) Virginia Wade	(United States) Carrie Meyer (United States) Terry Holladay (United Kingdom) Sue Barker (Romania) Virginia Ruzici
29 Jan	Avon Championships of Chicago; Chicago, United States; Avon Championships Circuit; Carpet (i) – $200,000 – 32S/16D	(United States) Martina Navratilova; 6–3, 6–4	(United States) Tracy Austin	(Australia) Kerry Reid (South Africa) Greer Stevens	(United States) Anne Smith (South Africa) Marise Kruger (Socialist Federal Republic of Yugoslavia) Mima Jaušovec (United Kingdom) Sue Barker
29 Jan	Avon Championships of Chicago; Chicago, United States; Avon Championships Circuit; Carpet (i) – $200,000 – 32S/16D	(United States) Rosie Casals (United States) Betty-Ann Stuart; 3–6, 7–5, 7–5	(South Africa) Ilana Kloss (South Africa) Greer Stevens	(Australia) Kerry Reid (South Africa) Greer Stevens	(United States) Anne Smith (South Africa) Marise Kruger (Socialist Federal Republic of Yugoslavia) Mima Jaušovec (United Kingdom) Sue Barker

=== February ===
Week	Tournament	Champions	Runners-up	Semifinalists	Quarterfinalists
5 Feb	Avon Championships of Seattle; Seattle, United States; Avon Championships Circuit; Carpet (i) – $125,000 – 32S/15D	(United States) Chris Evert; 6–1, 3–6, 6–1	(United States) Renée Richards	(Australia) Kerry Reid (United States) Jeanne DuVall	(United States) Kathy Jordan (Australia) Wendy Turnbull (Romania) Virginia Ruzici (Netherlands) Betty Stöve
5 Feb	Avon Championships of Seattle; Seattle, United States; Avon Championships Circuit; Carpet (i) – $125,000 – 32S/15D	(France) Françoise Dürr (Netherlands) Betty Stöve; 7–6^{(7–4)}, 4–6, 6–4	(United Kingdom) Sue Barker (United States) Ann Kiyomura	(Australia) Kerry Reid (United States) Jeanne DuVall	(United States) Kathy Jordan (Australia) Wendy Turnbull (Romania) Virginia Ruzici (Netherlands) Betty Stöve
12 Feb	Avon Championships of Los Angeles; Los Angeles, United States; Avon Championships Circuit; Carpet (i) – $150,000 – 32S/16D	(United States) Chris Evert; 6–3, 6–4	(United States) Martina Navratilova	(United States) Tracy Austin (South Africa) Greer Stevens	(United States) Barbara Potter (United States) Ann Kiyomura (Australia) Wendy Turnbull (Romania) Virginia Ruzici
12 Feb	Avon Championships of Los Angeles; Los Angeles, United States; Avon Championships Circuit; Carpet (i) – $150,000 – 32S/16D	(United States) Rosie Casals (United States) Chris Evert; 6–4, 1–6, 6–3	(United States) Martina Navratilova (United States) Anne Smith	(United States) Tracy Austin (South Africa) Greer Stevens	(United States) Barbara Potter (United States) Ann Kiyomura (Australia) Wendy Turnbull (Romania) Virginia Ruzici
19 Feb	Avon Championships of Detroit; Detroit, United States; Avon Championships Circuit; Carpet (i) – $150,000 – 32S/16D	(Australia) Wendy Turnbull; 7–5, 1–6, 7–6^{(7–4)}	(Romania) Virginia Ruzici	(United States) Martina Navratilova (United States) Rosie Casals	(United States) Anne Smith (Socialist Federal Republic of Yugoslavia) Mima Jaušovec (United States) Ann Kiyomura (Australia) Dianne Fromholtz
19 Feb	Avon Championships of Detroit; Detroit, United States; Avon Championships Circuit; Carpet (i) – $150,000 – 32S/16D	(Australia) Wendy Turnbull (Netherlands) Betty Stöve; 6–4, 7–6^{(7–5)}	(United Kingdom) Sue Barker (United States) Ann Kiyomura	(United States) Martina Navratilova (United States) Rosie Casals	(United States) Anne Smith (Socialist Federal Republic of Yugoslavia) Mima Jaušovec (United States) Ann Kiyomura (Australia) Dianne Fromholtz
26 Feb	Avon Championships of Dallas; Dallas, United States; Avon Championships Circuit; Carpet (i) – $200,000 – 32S/14D	(United States) Martina Navratilova; 6–4, 6–4	(United States) Chris Evert	(United States) Tracy Austin (United Kingdom) Virginia Wade	(United States) Stacy Margolin (Czechoslovakia) Renáta Tomanová (Australia) Dianne Fromholtz (United Kingdom) Sue Barker
26 Feb	Avon Championships of Dallas; Dallas, United States; Avon Championships Circuit; Carpet (i) – $200,000 – 32S/14D	(United States) Martina Navratilova (United States) Anne Smith; 7–6, 6–2	(United States) Rosie Casals (United States) Chris Evert	(United States) Tracy Austin (United Kingdom) Virginia Wade	(United States) Stacy Margolin (Czechoslovakia) Renáta Tomanová (Australia) Dianne Fromholtz (United Kingdom) Sue Barker

=== March ===
Week	Tournament	Champions	Runners-up	Semifinalists	Quarterfinalists
5 Mar	Avon Championships of Philadelphia; Philadelphia, United States; Avon Championships Circuit; Carpet (i) – $125,000 – 32S/16D	(Australia) Wendy Turnbull; 5–7, 6–3, 6–2	(United Kingdom) Virginia Wade	(United States) Rosie Casals (United Kingdom) Sue Barker	(United States) Terry Holladay (United States) Pam Shriver (South Africa) Greer Stevens (United States) Kathy Teacher
5 Mar	Avon Championships of Philadelphia; Philadelphia, United States; Avon Championships Circuit; Carpet (i) – $125,000 – 32S/16D	(France) Françoise Dürr (Netherlands) Betty Stöve; 6–4, 6–2	(United States) Renée Richards (United Kingdom) Virginia Wade	(United States) Rosie Casals (United Kingdom) Sue Barker	(United States) Terry Holladay (United States) Pam Shriver (South Africa) Greer Stevens (United States) Kathy Teacher
12 Mar	Avon Championships of Boston; Boston, United States; Avon Championships Circuit; Carpet (i) – $150,000 – 34S/16D	(Australia) Dianne Fromholtz; 6–2, 7–6^{(7–4)}	(United Kingdom) Sue Barker	(United Kingdom) Virginia Wade (Australia) Wendy Turnbull	(United States) Chris Evert (South Africa) Greer Stevens (Australia) Kerry Reid (United States) Marita Redondo
12 Mar	Avon Championships of Boston; Boston, United States; Avon Championships Circuit; Carpet (i) – $150,000 – 34S/16D	(Australia) Kerry Reid (Australia) Wendy Turnbull; 6–4, 6–2	(United Kingdom) Sue Barker (United States) Ann Kiyomura	(United Kingdom) Virginia Wade (Australia) Wendy Turnbull	(United States) Chris Evert (South Africa) Greer Stevens (Australia) Kerry Reid (United States) Marita Redondo
19 Mar	Avon Championships; New York City, United States; Season-end championships Carpet (i) – $275,000 – 8S/4D	(United States) Martina Navratilova; 6–3, 3–6, 6–2	(United States) Tracy Austin	(United Kingdom) Sue Barker (Australia) Dianne Fromholtz	Round robin (South Africa) Greer Stevens (United Kingdom) Virginia Wade (Australia) Wendy Turnbull (United States) Chris Evert
19 Mar	Avon Championships; New York City, United States; Season-end championships Carpet (i) – $275,000 – 8S/4D	(France) Françoise Dürr (Netherlands) Betty Stöve; 7–6^{(7–1)}, 7–6^{(7–3)}	(United Kingdom) Sue Barker (United States) Ann Kiyomura	(United Kingdom) Sue Barker (Australia) Dianne Fromholtz	Round robin (South Africa) Greer Stevens (United Kingdom) Virginia Wade (Australia) Wendy Turnbull (United States) Chris Evert

=== April ===
Week	Tournament	Champions	Runners-up	Semifinalists	Quarterfinalists
2 Apr	Bridgestone Doubles Championships; Tokyo, Japan; Carpet (i) – $150,000 – 8D	(France) Françoise Dürr (Netherlands) Betty Stöve; 7–5, 7–6^{(9–7)}	(United Kingdom) Sue Barker (United States) Ann Kiyomura	(Australia) Melville / (Australia) Turnbull (Australia) Hunt / (United States) Walsh	(United States) Acker / (United States) Carillo (United Kingdom) Wade / (United States) Newberry (United States) Casals / (United States) Smith (United States) Meyer / (United States) Teeguarden
9 Apr	Family Circle Cup; Amelia Island, United States; Colgate Series (AAAA); Clay – $150,000 – 30S/16D	(United States) Tracy Austin; 7–6^{(7–3)}, 7–6^{(9–7)}	(Australia) Kerry Reid	(United States) Martina Navratilova (Australia) Evonne Goolagong Cawley	(Socialist Federal Republic of Yugoslavia) Mima Jaušovec (United States) Lele Forood (Netherlands) Betty Stöve (United States) Laura duPont
9 Apr	Family Circle Cup; Amelia Island, United States; Colgate Series (AAAA); Clay – $150,000 – 30S/16D	(United States) Rosie Casals (United States) Martina Navratilova; 6–4, 7–5	(France) Françoise Dürr (Netherlands) Betty Stöve	(United States) Martina Navratilova (Australia) Evonne Goolagong Cawley	(Socialist Federal Republic of Yugoslavia) Mima Jaušovec (United States) Lele Forood (Netherlands) Betty Stöve (United States) Laura duPont
30 Apr	Federation Cup; Madrid, Spain; Clay – 32 teams knockout	United States; 3–0	Australia	Czechoslovakia; Soviet Union	France; Switzerland; Great Britain; Netherlands

=== May ===
Week	Tournament	Champions	Runners-up	Semifinalists	Quarterfinalists
7 May	Italian Open; Rome, Italy; Colgate Series (AAA); Clay – $100,000	(United States) Tracy Austin; 6–4, 1–6, 6–3	(West Germany) Sylvia Hanika	(United States) Chris Evert (Australia) Evonne Goolagong Cawley	(Argentina) Ivanna Madruga (Romania) Virginia Ruzici (Australia) Dianne Fromholtz (West Germany) Iris Riedel-Kuhn
7 May	Italian Open; Rome, Italy; Colgate Series (AAA); Clay – $100,000	(Australia) Wendy Turnbull (Netherlands) Betty Stöve; 6–3, 6–4	(Australia) Evonne Goolagong Cawley (Australia) Kerry Reid	(United States) Chris Evert (Australia) Evonne Goolagong Cawley	(Argentina) Ivanna Madruga (Romania) Virginia Ruzici (Australia) Dianne Fromholtz (West Germany) Iris Riedel-Kuhn
14 May	Bancroft Trophy; Vienna, Austria; Colgate Series (AA); Carpet (i) – $75,000	(United States) Chris Evert; 6–1, 6–1	(United States) Caroline Stoll	(Czechoslovakia) Regina Maršíková (Romania) Virginia Ruzici	(South Africa) Yvonne Vermaak (Australia) Kerry Reid (Australia) Wendy Turnbull (Australia) Dianne Fromholtz
14 May	Bancroft Trophy; Vienna, Austria; Colgate Series (AA); Carpet (i) – $75,000	(South Africa) Marise Kruger (Australia) Dianne Fromholtz; 3–6, 6–4, 6–1	(South Africa) Ilana Kloss (United States) Betty-Ann Stuart	(Czechoslovakia) Regina Maršíková (Romania) Virginia Ruzici	(South Africa) Yvonne Vermaak (Australia) Kerry Reid (Australia) Wendy Turnbull (Australia) Dianne Fromholtz
21 May	German Open; West Berlin, West Germany; Colgate Series (AAA); Clay – $100,000 – 32S/16D	(United States) Caroline Stoll; 7–6^{(7–4)}, 6–0	(Czechoslovakia) Regina Maršíková	(Romania) Virginia Ruzici (Australia) Evonne Goolagong Cawley	(Socialist Federal Republic of Yugoslavia) Mima Jaušovec (West Germany) Sylvia Hanika (Czechoslovakia) Renáta Tomanová (Australia) Kerry Reid
21 May	German Open; West Berlin, West Germany; Colgate Series (AAA); Clay – $100,000 – 32S/16D	(United States) Rosie Casals (Australia) Wendy Turnbull; 6–2, 7–5	(Australia) Evonne Goolagong Cawley (Australia) Kerry Reid	(Romania) Virginia Ruzici (Australia) Evonne Goolagong Cawley	(Socialist Federal Republic of Yugoslavia) Mima Jaušovec (West Germany) Sylvia Hanika (Czechoslovakia) Renáta Tomanová (Australia) Kerry Reid
28 May; 4 Jun	French Open; Paris, France; Grand Slam; Clay – $375,000 – 64S/64Q/32D/28X; Singles – Doubles – Mixed doubles	(United States) Chris Evert; 6–2, 6–0	(Australia) Wendy Turnbull	(Australia) Dianne Fromholtz (Czechoslovakia) Regina Maršíková	(United States) Ruta Gerulaitis (Romania) Virginia Ruzici (Czechoslovakia) Hana Mandlíková (Czechoslovakia) Renáta Tomanová
28 May; 4 Jun	French Open; Paris, France; Grand Slam; Clay – $375,000 – 64S/64Q/32D/28X; Singles – Doubles – Mixed doubles	(Netherlands) Betty Stöve (Australia) Wendy Turnbull; 3–6, 7–5, 6–4	(France) Françoise Dürr (United Kingdom) Virginia Wade	(Australia) Dianne Fromholtz (Czechoslovakia) Regina Maršíková	(United States) Ruta Gerulaitis (Romania) Virginia Ruzici (Czechoslovakia) Hana Mandlíková (Czechoslovakia) Renáta Tomanová
28 May; 4 Jun	French Open; Paris, France; Grand Slam; Clay – $375,000 – 64S/64Q/32D/28X; Singles – Doubles – Mixed doubles	(Australia) Wendy Turnbull (South Africa) Bob Hewitt; 6–3, 2–6, 6–3	(Romania) Virginia Ruzici (Romania) Ion Țiriac	(Australia) Dianne Fromholtz (Czechoslovakia) Regina Maršíková	(United States) Ruta Gerulaitis (Romania) Virginia Ruzici (Czechoslovakia) Hana Mandlíková (Czechoslovakia) Renáta Tomanová

=== June ===
Week	Tournament	Champions	Runners-up	Semifinalists	Quarterfinalists
11 Jun	Crossley Carpets Trophy; Chichester, Great Britain; Colgate Series (AA); Grass – $35,000 – 32S/16D	(Australia) Evonne Goolagong Cawley; 6–1, 6–4	(United Kingdom) Sue Barker	(United States) Billie Jean King (South Africa) Tanya Harford	(United States) Martina Navratilova (United States) Pam Teeguarden (United States) Kate Latham (United States) Pam Shriver
11 Jun	Crossley Carpets Trophy; Chichester, Great Britain; Colgate Series (AA); Grass – $35,000 – 32S/16D	(South Africa) Greer Stevens (Australia) Wendy Turnbull; 6–3, 1–6, 7–5	(United States) Billie Jean King (United States) Martina Navratilova	(United States) Billie Jean King (South Africa) Tanya Harford	(United States) Martina Navratilova (United States) Pam Teeguarden (United States) Kate Latham (United States) Pam Shriver
18 Jun	Colgate International; Eastbourne, Great Britain; Colgate Series (AAA); Grass – $100,000 – 64S/32D	(United States) Chris Evert; 7–5, 5–7, 13–11	(United States) Martina Navratilova	(United States) Tracy Austin (United Kingdom) Virginia Wade	(Australia) Wendy Turnbull (South Africa) Ilana Kloss (West Germany) Bettina Bunge (Australia) Kerry Reid
18 Jun	Colgate International; Eastbourne, Great Britain; Colgate Series (AAA); Grass – $100,000 – 64S/32D	(Netherlands) Betty Stöve (Australia) Wendy Turnbull; 6–2, 6–2	(South Africa) Ilana Kloss (United States) Betty-Ann Stuart	(United States) Tracy Austin (United Kingdom) Virginia Wade	(Australia) Wendy Turnbull (South Africa) Ilana Kloss (West Germany) Bettina Bunge (Australia) Kerry Reid
25 Jun; 2 July	Wimbledon Championships; London, Great Britain; Grand Slam; Grass – 96S/48D/48X; Draws: Singles – Doubles – Mixed doubles	(United States) Martina Navratilova; 6–4, 6–4	(United States) Chris Evert	(United States) Tracy Austin (Australia) Evonne Goolagong Cawley	(Australia) Dianne Fromholtz (United States) Billie Jean King (United Kingdom) Virginia Wade (Australia) Wendy Turnbull
25 Jun; 2 July	Wimbledon Championships; London, Great Britain; Grand Slam; Grass – 96S/48D/48X; Draws: Singles – Doubles – Mixed doubles	(United States) Billie Jean King (United States) Martina Navratilova; 5–7, 6–3, 6–2	(Netherlands) Betty Stöve (Australia) Wendy Turnbull	(United States) Tracy Austin (Australia) Evonne Goolagong Cawley	(Australia) Dianne Fromholtz (United States) Billie Jean King (United Kingdom) Virginia Wade (Australia) Wendy Turnbull
25 Jun; 2 July	Wimbledon Championships; London, Great Britain; Grand Slam; Grass – 96S/48D/48X; Draws: Singles – Doubles – Mixed doubles	(South Africa) Greer Stevens (South Africa) Bob Hewitt; 7–5, 7–6^{(9–7)}	(Netherlands) Betty Stöve (South Africa) Frew McMillan	(United States) Tracy Austin (Australia) Evonne Goolagong Cawley	(Australia) Dianne Fromholtz (United States) Billie Jean King (United Kingdom) Virginia Wade (Australia) Wendy Turnbull

=== July ===
Week	Tournament	Champions	Runners-up	Semifinalists	Quarterfinalists
16 Jul	Austrian Open; Kitzbühel, Austria; Colgate Series; Clay – $35,000 – 32S/16D	(Czechoslovakia) Hana Mandlíková; 2–6, 7–5, 6–3	(West Germany) Sylvia Hanika		
16 Jul	Austrian Open; Kitzbühel, Austria; Colgate Series; Clay – $35,000 – 32S/16D	(Sweden) Helena Anliot (Australia) Dianne Evers; 6–0, 6–4	(Romania) Virginia Ruzici (Netherlands) Elly Vessies		
30 Jul	Wells Fargo Open; San Diego, United States; Colgate Series (AA); Hard – $75,000 – 32S/16D	(United States) Tracy Austin; 6–4, 6–2	(United States) Martina Navratilova	(United Kingdom) Virginia Wade (United States) Kathy Jordan	(United States) Anne Smith (Australia) Kerry Reid (United States) Marita Redondo (United States) Ann Kiyomura
30 Jul	Wells Fargo Open; San Diego, United States; Colgate Series (AA); Hard – $75,000 – 32S/16D	(United States) Rosie Casals (United States) Martina Navratilova; 3–6, 6–4, 6–2	(United States) Ann Kiyomura (United States) Betty-Ann Stuart	(United Kingdom) Virginia Wade (United States) Kathy Jordan	(United States) Anne Smith (Australia) Kerry Reid (United States) Marita Redondo (United States) Ann Kiyomura

=== August ===
Week	Tournament	Champions	Runners-up	Semifinalists	Quarterfinalists
6 Aug	U.S. Clay Court Championships; Indianapolis, United States; Colgate Series (AAA); Clay – $100,000 – 48S/24D; Singles – Doubles	(United States) Chris Evert; 6–4, 6–3	(Australia) Evonne Goolagong Cawley	(United States) Renée Richards (Czechoslovakia) Regina Maršíková	(Socialist Federal Republic of Yugoslavia) Mima Jaušovec (Romania) Virginia Ruzici (United States) Anne Smith (United States) Jeanne DuVall
6 Aug	U.S. Clay Court Championships; Indianapolis, United States; Colgate Series (AAA); Clay – $100,000 – 48S/24D; Singles – Doubles	(United States) Kathy Jordan (United States) Anne Smith; 6–1, 6–0	(United States) Penny Johnson (United States) Paula Smith	(United States) Renée Richards (Czechoslovakia) Regina Maršíková	(Socialist Federal Republic of Yugoslavia) Mima Jaušovec (Romania) Virginia Ruzici (United States) Anne Smith (United States) Jeanne DuVall
13 Aug	Rothmans Canadian Open; Toronto, Canada; Colgate Series (A); Hard – $35,000	(United States) Laura duPont; 6–4, 6–7^{(3–7)}, 6–1	(South Africa) Brigitte Cuypers	(United States) Diane Desfor (United States) Pam Teeguarden	(Australia) Chris O'Neil (United States) Lea Antonoplis (United States) Kay McDaniel (United States) Mary Carillo
13 Aug	Rothmans Canadian Open; Toronto, Canada; Colgate Series (A); Hard – $35,000	(United States) Lea Antonoplis (Australia) Dianne Evers; 2–6, 6–1, 6–3	(Australia) Chris O'Neil (Sweden) Mimmi Wikstedt	(United States) Diane Desfor (United States) Pam Teeguarden	(Australia) Chris O'Neil (United States) Lea Antonoplis (United States) Kay McDaniel (United States) Mary Carillo
13 Aug	Central Fidelity Banks International; Richmond, United States; Colgate Series (AAA); Carpet (i) – $100,000 – 32S/16D	(United States) Martina Navratilova; 6–1, 6–3	(United States) Kathy Jordan	(Australia) Wendy Turnbull (United Kingdom) Virginia Wade	(United States) Anne Smith (Australia) Kerry Reid (United States) Kate Latham (South Africa) Greer Stevens
13 Aug	Central Fidelity Banks International; Richmond, United States; Colgate Series (AAA); Carpet (i) – $100,000 – 32S/16D	(Netherlands) Betty Stöve (Australia) Wendy Turnbull; 6–1, 6–4	(United States) Billie Jean King (United States) Martina Navratilova	(Australia) Wendy Turnbull (United Kingdom) Virginia Wade	(United States) Anne Smith (Australia) Kerry Reid (United States) Kate Latham (South Africa) Greer Stevens
20 Aug	Volvo Tennis Cup; Mahwah, United States; Colgate Series (AAA); Clay – $75,000 – 32S/16D	(United States) Chris Evert; 6–7^{(2–7)}, 6–4, 6–1	(United States) Tracy Austin	(Netherlands) Betty Stöve (Romania) Virginia Ruzici	(United Kingdom) Sue Barker (Argentina) Ivanna Madruga (United States) Terry Holladay (Czechoslovakia) Regina Maršíková
20 Aug	Volvo Tennis Cup; Mahwah, United States; Colgate Series (AAA); Clay – $75,000 – 32S/16D	(United States) Tracy Austin (Netherlands) Betty Stöve; 7–6^{(7–4)}, 2–6, 6–4	(Socialist Federal Republic of Yugoslavia) Mima Jaušovec (Czechoslovakia) Regina Maršíková	(Netherlands) Betty Stöve (Romania) Virginia Ruzici	(United Kingdom) Sue Barker (Argentina) Ivanna Madruga (United States) Terry Holladay (Czechoslovakia) Regina Maršíková
27 Aug; 3 Sep	US Open; New York City, United States; Grand Slam (AAAA); Hard – $300,000 – 96S/32D/32X; Draw: Singles – Doubles – Mixed doubles	(United States) Tracy Austin; 6–3, 6–4	(United States) Chris Evert	(United States) Billie Jean King (United States) Martina Navratilova	(Australia) Evonne Goolagong Cawley (United Kingdom) Virginia Wade (West Germany) Sylvia Hanika (Australia) Kerry Reid
27 Aug; 3 Sep	US Open; New York City, United States; Grand Slam (AAAA); Hard – $300,000 – 96S/32D/32X; Draw: Singles – Doubles – Mixed doubles	(Netherlands) Betty Stöve (Australia) Wendy Turnbull; 7–5, 6–3	(United States) Billie Jean King (United States) Martina Navratilova	(United States) Billie Jean King (United States) Martina Navratilova	(Australia) Evonne Goolagong Cawley (United Kingdom) Virginia Wade (West Germany) Sylvia Hanika (Australia) Kerry Reid
27 Aug; 3 Sep	US Open; New York City, United States; Grand Slam (AAAA); Hard – $300,000 – 96S/32D/32X; Draw: Singles – Doubles – Mixed doubles	(South Africa) Greer Stevens (South Africa) Bob Hewitt; 6–3, 7–5	(Netherlands) Betty Stöve (South Africa) Frew McMillan	(United States) Billie Jean King (United States) Martina Navratilova	(Australia) Evonne Goolagong Cawley (United Kingdom) Virginia Wade (West Germany) Sylvia Hanika (Australia) Kerry Reid

=== September ===
Week	Tournament	Champions	Runners-up	Semifinalists	Quarterfinalists
10 Sep	Toray Sillook Open; Tokyo, Japan; Colgate Series (AAAA); Hard – $150,000 – 32S	(United States) Billie Jean King; 6–4, 7–5	(Australia) Evonne Goolagong Cawley	(Australia) Dianne Fromholtz (3rd) (United States) Ann Kiyomura (4th)	(United States) Terry Holladay (Australia) Kerry Reid (Australia) Wendy Turnbull (Netherlands) Betty Stöve
10 Sep	Greater Pittsburgh Open; Pittsburgh, United States; Colgate Series (A); Hard – $35,000 – 32S/16D	(United Kingdom) Sue Barker; 6–3, 6–1	(United States) Renée Richards		
10 Sep	Greater Pittsburgh Open; Pittsburgh, United States; Colgate Series (A); Hard – $35,000 – 32S/16D	(United Kingdom) Sue Barker (United States) Candy Reynolds; 6–3, 6–2	(United States) Bunny Bruning (United States) Jane Stratton		
24 Sep	Davison's Tennis Classic; Atlanta, United States; Colgate Series (AAA); Carpet (i) – $100,000 – 32S/16D	(United States) Martina Navratilova; 7–6^{(8–6)}, 6–4	(Australia) Wendy Turnbull	(Australia) Evonne Goolagong Cawley (United States) Tracy Austin	(United Kingdom) Virginia Wade (South Africa) Marise Kruger (Australia) Dianne Fromholtz (United States) Chris Evert
24 Sep	Davison's Tennis Classic; Atlanta, United States; Colgate Series (AAA); Carpet (i) – $100,000 – 32S/16D	(Netherlands) Betty Stöve (Australia) Wendy Turnbull; 6–2, 6–4	(United States) Ann Kiyomura (United States) Anne Smith	(Australia) Evonne Goolagong Cawley (United States) Tracy Austin	(United Kingdom) Virginia Wade (South Africa) Marise Kruger (Australia) Dianne Fromholtz (United States) Chris Evert

=== October ===
Week	Tournament	Champions	Runners-up	Semifinalists	Quarterfinalists
1 Oct	US Indoors Championships; Minneapolis, United States; Colgate Series (AAAA); Carpet (i) – $100,000 – 32S/16D	(Australia) Evonne Goolagong Cawley; 6–3, 6–4	(Australia) Dianne Fromholtz	(United States) Martina Navratilova (United States) Tracy Austin	(United States) Ann Kiyomura (United States) Billie Jean King (United Kingdom) Virginia Wade (Australia) Kerry Reid
1 Oct	US Indoors Championships; Minneapolis, United States; Colgate Series (AAAA); Carpet (i) – $100,000 – 32S/16D	(United States) Billie Jean King (United States) Martina Navratilova; 6–4, 7–6^{(9–7)}	(Netherlands) Betty Stöve (Australia) Wendy Turnbull	(United States) Martina Navratilova (United States) Tracy Austin	(United States) Ann Kiyomura (United States) Billie Jean King (United Kingdom) Virginia Wade (Australia) Kerry Reid
8 Oct	Thunderbird Classic; Phoenix, United States; Colgate Series (AAA); Hard – $100,000 – 32S/16S	(United States) Martina Navratilova; 6–1, 6–3	(United States) Chris Evert	(United States) Kate Latham (Australia) Wendy Turnbull	(United States) Laura duPont (Australia) Kerry Reid (United States) Caroline Stoll (United States) Ann Kiyomura
8 Oct	Thunderbird Classic; Phoenix, United States; Colgate Series (AAA); Hard – $100,000 – 32S/16S	(Netherlands) Betty Stöve (Australia) Wendy Turnbull; 6–4, 7–6^{(7–4)}	(United States) Rosie Casals (United States) Chris Evert	(United States) Kate Latham (Australia) Wendy Turnbull	(United States) Laura duPont (Australia) Kerry Reid (United States) Caroline Stoll (United States) Ann Kiyomura
15 Oct	Borden Classic; Kyoto, Japan; Colgate Series (A); Carpet (i) – $35,000 – 32S/16S	(United States) Betsy Nagelsen; 6–3, 6–4	(Japan) Naoko Sato		
15 Oct	Borden Classic; Kyoto, Japan; Colgate Series (A); Carpet (i) – $35,000 – 32S/16S	(China) Chen Chuan (China) Yu Liqiao; 7–6, 3–6, 7–5	(Australia) Sue Saliba (Australia) Mary Sawyer		
22 Oct	Florida Federal Open; Tampa, United States; Colgate Series (AAA); Hard – $100,000 – 32S/16D	(Australia) Evonne Goolagong Cawley; 6–0, 6–3	(United Kingdom) Virginia Wade	(United States) Chris Evert (United States) Tracy Austin	(Romania) Virginia Ruzici (Czechoslovakia) Regina Maršíková (Australia) Wendy Turnbull (Australia) Kerry Reid
22 Oct	Florida Federal Open; Tampa, United States; Colgate Series (AAA); Hard – $100,000 – 32S/16D	(United States) Anne Smith (Romania) Virginia Ruzici; 7–5, 4–6, 7–5	(South Africa) Ilana Kloss (United States) Betty-Ann Stuart	(United States) Chris Evert (United States) Tracy Austin	(Romania) Virginia Ruzici (Czechoslovakia) Regina Maršíková (Australia) Wendy Turnbull (Australia) Kerry Reid
22 Oct	Hit Union Japan Open; Tokyo, Japan; Colgate Series (A); Carpet (i) – $35,000 – 32S/16D	(United States) Betsy Nagelsen; 6–1, 3–6, 6–3	(Japan) Naoko Sato	(Australia) Sue Saliba (Japan) Sonoe Yonezawa	(United States) Jean Nachand (Japan) Fumiko Furuhashi (Indonesia) Yolanda Soemarno (Australia) Cynthia Doerner
22 Oct	Hit Union Japan Open; Tokyo, Japan; Colgate Series (A); Carpet (i) – $35,000 – 32S/16D	(United States) Betsy Nagelsen (United States) Penny Johnson; 3–6, 6–4, 7–6	(China) Chen Chuan (China) Yu Liqiao	(Australia) Sue Saliba (Japan) Sonoe Yonezawa	(United States) Jean Nachand (Japan) Fumiko Furuhashi (Indonesia) Yolanda Soemarno (Australia) Cynthia Doerner
29 Oct	Stockholm Open; Stockholm, Sweden; Colgate Series (A); Carpet (i) – $35,000 – 32S/16S	(United States) Billie Jean King; 6–3, 6–7, 7–5	(Netherlands) Betty Stöve	(Romania) Virginia Ruzici (Sweden) Lena Sandin	(Czechoslovakia) Hana Mandlíková (South Africa) Brigitte Cuypers (United States) Anne Smith (Socialist Federal Republic of Yugoslavia) Mima Jaušovec
29 Oct	Stockholm Open; Stockholm, Sweden; Colgate Series (A); Carpet (i) – $35,000 – 32S/16S	(Netherlands) Betty Stöve (Australia) Wendy Turnbull; 7–5, 7–6	(United States) Billie Jean King (South Africa) Ilana Kloss	(Romania) Virginia Ruzici (Sweden) Lena Sandin	(Czechoslovakia) Hana Mandlíková (South Africa) Brigitte Cuypers (United States) Anne Smith (Socialist Federal Republic of Yugoslavia) Mima Jaušovec
29 Oct	Wightman Cup; West Palm Beach, United States; Hard (i); Team event	United States; 7–0	Great Britain		

=== November ===
Week	Tournament	Champions	Runners-up	Semifinalists	Quarterfinalists
5 Nov	Porsche Tennis Grand Prix; Filderstadt, West Germany; Colgate Series (AAA); Carpet (i) – $100,000 – 32S/16D	(United States) Tracy Austin; 6–2, 6–0	(United States) Martina Navratilova	(Socialist Federal Republic of Yugoslavia) Mima Jaušovec (United States) Chris Evert	(Australia) Kerry Reid (Sweden) Nina Bohm (Czechoslovakia) Regina Maršíková (Australia) Wendy Turnbull
5 Nov	Porsche Tennis Grand Prix; Filderstadt, West Germany; Colgate Series (AAA); Carpet (i) – $100,000 – 32S/16D	(United States) Billie Jean King (United States) Martina Navratilova; 6–3, 6–3	(Australia) Wendy Turnbull (Netherlands) Betty Stöve	(Socialist Federal Republic of Yugoslavia) Mima Jaušovec (United States) Chris Evert	(Australia) Kerry Reid (Sweden) Nina Bohm (Czechoslovakia) Regina Maršíková (Australia) Wendy Turnbull
19 Nov	Daihatsu Challenge; Brighton, Great Britain; Colgate Series (AAA); Carpet (i) – $75,000 – 32S/16D	(United States) Martina Navratilova; 6–3, 6–3	(United States) Chris Evert	(United States) Billie Jean King (West Germany) Sylvia Hanika	(South Africa) Ilana Kloss (United Kingdom) Glynis Coles (United Kingdom) Virginia Wade (Romania) Virginia Ruzici
19 Nov	Daihatsu Challenge; Brighton, Great Britain; Colgate Series (AAA); Carpet (i) – $75,000 – 32S/16D	(United States) Ann Kiyomura (United States) Anne Smith; 6–2, 6–1	(South Africa) Ilana Kloss (United States) Laura duPont	(United States) Billie Jean King (West Germany) Sylvia Hanika	(South Africa) Ilana Kloss (United Kingdom) Glynis Coles (United Kingdom) Virginia Wade (Romania) Virginia Ruzici
26 Nov	Toyota Classic; Melbourne, Australia; Colgate Series (AAA); Grass – $100,000 – 32S/16D	(Czechoslovakia) Hana Mandlíková; 6–3, 6–2	(Australia) Wendy Turnbull	(United States) Renee Blount (Romania) Virginia Ruzici	(Sweden) Mimmi Wikstedt (Australia) Dianne Fromholtz (United Kingdom) Sue Barker (United States) Billie Jean King
26 Nov	Toyota Classic; Melbourne, Australia; Colgate Series (AAA); Grass – $100,000 – 32S/16D	(Australia) Wendy Turnbull (United States) Billie Jean King; 6–3, 6–3	(Australia) Dianne Fromholtz (United States) Anne Smith	(United States) Renee Blount (Romania) Virginia Ruzici	(Sweden) Mimmi Wikstedt (Australia) Dianne Fromholtz (United Kingdom) Sue Barker (United States) Billie Jean King

=== December ===
Week	Tournament	Champions	Runners-up	Semifinalists	Quarterfinalists
3 Dec	NSW Building Society Women's Classic; Sydney, Australia; Colgate Series (AAA); Grass – $100,000 – 32S/16D	(United Kingdom) Sue Barker; 6–0, 7–5	(South Africa) Rosalyn Fairbank	(United States) Diane Desfor (Czechoslovakia) Regina Maršíková	(Romania) Virginia Ruzici (Czechoslovakia) Hana Mandlíková (Australia) Wendy Turnbull (United States) Betty-Ann Stuart
3 Dec	NSW Building Society Women's Classic; Sydney, Australia; Colgate Series (AAA); Grass – $100,000 – 32S/16D	(Australia) Wendy Turnbull (United States) Billie Jean King; 7–5, 6–4	(United States) Pam Shriver (United Kingdom) Sue Barker	(United States) Diane Desfor (Czechoslovakia) Regina Maršíková	(Romania) Virginia Ruzici (Czechoslovakia) Hana Mandlíková (Australia) Wendy Turnbull (United States) Betty-Ann Stuart
10 Dec	Berri Fruit Juices; Adelaide, Australia; Colgate Series; Grass – $100,000 – 32S/16D	(Czechoslovakia) Hana Mandlíková; 7–5, 2–2 ret.	(Romania) Virginia Ruzici	(United Kingdom) Sue Barker (United States) Betty-Ann Stuart	(United States) Pam Shriver (United States) Susan Leo (United States) Roberta McCallum (United States) Diane Desfor
10 Dec	Berri Fruit Juices; Adelaide, Australia; Colgate Series; Grass – $100,000 – 32S/16D	(Czechoslovakia) Hana Mandlíková (Romania) Virginia Ruzici; 2–6, 6–4, 6–4	(United States) Pam Shriver (United Kingdom) Sue Barker	(United Kingdom) Sue Barker (United States) Betty-Ann Stuart	(United States) Pam Shriver (United States) Susan Leo (United States) Roberta McCallum (United States) Diane Desfor
17 Dec	Nabisco NSW; Sydney, Australia; Colgate Series; Grass – $50,000 – 32S/16D	(Czechoslovakia) Hana Mandlíková; 6–3, 3–6, 6–3	(West Germany) Bettina Bunge	(United Kingdom) Sue Barker (Czechoslovakia) Renáta Tomanová	(South Africa) Rosalyn Fairbank (United States) Diane Morrison (United States) Janet Newberry (Australia) Leanne Harrison
17 Dec	Nabisco NSW; Sydney, Australia; Colgate Series; Grass – $50,000 – 32S/16D	(United States) Diane Desfor (United States) Barbara Hallquist; 4–6, 6–2, 6–2	(United States) Barbara Jordan (Australia) Kym Ruddell	(United Kingdom) Sue Barker (Czechoslovakia) Renáta Tomanová	(South Africa) Rosalyn Fairbank (United States) Diane Morrison (United States) Janet Newberry (Australia) Leanne Harrison
24 Dec; 31 Dec	Australian Open; Melbourne, Australia; Grand Slam; Grass – $350,000 – 64S/32D; Singles – Doubles	(United States) Barbara Jordan; 6–3, 6–3	(United States) Sharon Walsh	(Australia) Mary Sawyer (Czechoslovakia) Renáta Tomanová	(United States) Janet Newberry (Belgium) Michele Gurdal (Australia) Cynthia Doerner (Czechoslovakia) Hana Mandlíková
24 Dec; 31 Dec	Australian Open; Melbourne, Australia; Grand Slam; Grass – $350,000 – 64S/32D; Singles – Doubles	(Australia) Judy Connor Chaloner (Australia) Dianne Evers; 6–1, 3–6, 6–0	(Australia) Leanne Harrison (Netherlands) Marcella Mesker	(Australia) Mary Sawyer (Czechoslovakia) Renáta Tomanová	(United States) Janet Newberry (Belgium) Michele Gurdal (Australia) Cynthia Doerner (Czechoslovakia) Hana Mandlíková

=== January (1980) ===
Week	Tournament	Champions	Runners-up	Semifinalists	Quarterfinalists
2 Jan	Colgate Series Championships; Landover, United States; Colgate Series championships Carpet (i) – $250,000 – 8S/4D	(United States) Martina Navratilova; 6–2, 6–1	(United States) Tracy Austin	(United States) Chris Evert (Australia) Wendy Turnbull	Round robin (Australia) Dianne Fromholtz (Australia) Evonne Goolagong Cawley (Czechoslovakia) Regina Maršíková (Australia) Kerry Reid
2 Jan	Colgate Series Championships; Landover, United States; Colgate Series championships Carpet (i) – $250,000 – 8S/4D	(United States) Billie Jean King (United States) Martina Navratilova; 6–4, 6–3	(United States) Rosie Casals (United States) Chris Evert	(United States) Chris Evert (Australia) Wendy Turnbull	Round robin (Australia) Dianne Fromholtz (Australia) Evonne Goolagong Cawley (Czechoslovakia) Regina Maršíková (Australia) Kerry Reid

== Rankings ==
Below are the 1979 WTA year-end rankings (December 31, 1979) in both singles and doubles competition:

Singles Year-end Ranking
No	Player Name	Points	1978	Change
1	Martina Navratilova (USA)	15.748	1	Steady
2	Chris Evert (USA)	14.111	2	Steady
3	Tracy Austin (USA)	14.004	6	▲3
4	Evonne Goolagong Cawley (AUS)	11.814	3	▼1
5	Billie Jean King (USA)	8.857	5	Steady
6	Dianne Fromholtz (AUS)	8.375	10	▲4
7	Wendy Turnbull (AUS)	8.214	7	Steady
8	Virginia Wade (GBR)	7.959	4	▼4
9	Kerry Reid (AUS)	6.645	9	Steady
10	Sue Barker (GBR)	6.618	24	▲14
11	Kathy Jordan (USA)	6.555	NR	NR
12	Greer Stevens (RSA)	6.336	17	▲5
13	Virginia Ruzici (ROU)	6.149	12	▼1
14	Regina Maršíková (TCH)	6.013	14	Steady
15	Ann Kiyomura (USA)	5.457	39	▲24
16	Sylvia Hanika (FRG)	5.010	35	▲19
17	Hana Mandlíková (TCH)	4.952	45	▲28
18	Caroline Stoll (USA)	4.951	26	▲8
19	Kathy May (USA)	4.768	15	▼4
20	Mima Jaušovec (YUG)	4.270	19	▼1

== Colgate Series ==
=== Points system ===
The tournaments of the Colgate Series were divided into four categories – AAAA, AAA, AA and A – based on prize money. Points were allocated based on these groups and the finishing position of a player in a tournament. The points allocation – with doubles points listed in brackets – was:

Group AAAA
Prize money at least $150,000
- Champion: 160 (32)
- Runner-up: 120 (24)
- Semifinalist: 80 (16)
- Quarterfinalist: 40 (8)
- Round of 16: 20 (4)
- Round of 32: 15 (3)
- Round of 64: 10

Group AAA
Prize money at least $100,000
- Champion: 120 (24)
- Runner-up: 90 (18)
- Semifinalist: 60 (12)
- Quarterfinalist: 30 (6)
- Round of 16: 15 (3)
- Round of 32: 10 (2)

Group AA
Prize money at least $75,000
- Champion: 80 (16)
- Runner-up: 60 (12)
- Semifinalist: 40 (8)
- Quarterfinalist: 20 (4)
- Round of 16: 10 (2)
- Round of 32: 5

Group A
Prize money at least $35,000
- Champion: 40 (8)
- Runner-up: 30 (6)
- Semifinalist: 20 (4)
- Quarterfinalist: 10 (2)
- Round of 16: 5

== Avon Championships Circuit ==
=== Points standing ===
Singles
No	Player name	Tournaments	Points
1	Martina Navratilova (USA)	7	2,500
2	Dianne Fromholtz (AUS)	8	1,660
3	Wendy Turnbull (AUS)	8	1,640
4	Chris Evert (USA)	6	1,586
5	Virginia Wade (GBR)	7	1,296
6	Tracy Austin (USA)	6	1,236
7	Greer Stevens (RSA)	7	1,156
8	Sue Barker (GBR)	9	1,062

Doubles
No	Team	Points
1	Rosemary Casals (USA); Chris Evert (USA)	1,140
2	Françoise Dürr (FRA); Betty Stöve (NED)	1,040
3	Sue Barker (GBR); Ann Kiyomura (USA)	900
4	Tracy Austin (USA); Betty Stöve (NED)	850
5	Mima Jaušovec (YUG); Virginia Ruzici (ROU)	820
6	Kerry Reid (AUS); Wendy Turnbull (AUS)	750

=== Prize money ===
Combined prize money for singles and doubles events.

No	Player name	Prize money
1	Martina Navratilova (USA)	$271,500
2	Tracy Austin (USA)	$123,250
3	Chris Evert (USA)	$115,875
4	Wendy Turnbull (AUS)	$103,425
5	Dianne Fromholtz (AUS)	$93,250
6	Sue Barker (GBR)	$84,775
7	Greer Stevens (RSA)	$73,050
8	Virginia Wade (GBR)	$70,500
9	Rosemary Casals (USA)	$55,425
10	Betty Stöve (NED)	$45,100

== See also ==
- 1979 Men's Grand Prix circuit
