= 1979 NSW Building Society Women's Classic =

- Date: 4–9 December
- Edition: 4th
- Category: Colgate Series (AAA)
- Draw: 32S / 16D
- Prize money: $100,000
- Surface: Grass
- Location: Sydney, Australia
- Venue: White City Stadium

Champions

Singles
- (United Kingdom) Sue Barker

Doubles
- (United States) Billie Jean King (Australia) Wendy Turnbull
- WTA Sydney

The 1979 NSW Building Society Women's Classic, was a women's tennis tournament played on outdoor grass courts at White City Stadium in Sydney in Australia. The event was part of the AAA (Note: Tournaments with prize money for the women of at least $100,000.) category of the Colgate Series which was incorporated into the 1979 WTA Tour. It was the fourth and last edition of the tournament and was held from 3 December through 3 December 1979. Fifth-seeded Sue Barker won the singles title and earned $20,000.

== Finals ==
=== Singles ===
(United Kingdom) Sue Barker defeated (South Africa) Rosalyn Fairbank 6–0, 7–5

- It was Barker's only singles title of the year and the 14th of her career.

=== Doubles ===
(United States) Billie Jean King / (Australia) Wendy Turnbull defeated (United States) Pam Shriver / (United Kingdom) Sue Barker 7–5, 6–4

== Prize money ==
Event	W	F	SF	QF	Round of 16	Round of 32	Round of 64
Singles	$20,000	$10,000	$5,300	$2,100	$1,000	$1,100	$550
