= Christchurch International (tennis) =

Tennis tournament in New Zealand

Defunct tennis tournament
- Event name: Colgate International
- Tour: ILTF World Circuit (1970–71), WTA Tour (1978)
- Founded: 1970
- Abolished: 1978
- Location: Christchurch, New Zealand
- Surface: Grass

The Christchurch International (also known by its corporate title of the Colgate International) is a defunct WTA Tour affiliated tennis tournament founded in 1970 as the Christchurch International Championships the first tournament ran until 1971. In 1978 it was revived and was held in Christchurch, New Zealand, and was played on outdoor grass courts.

The 1970 and 1971 editions were events on the ILTF World Circuit. It was not held again until 1978, when it became a professional tournament on the WTA Tour and offered a total of US$35,000 in prize money. The event has been cancelled since.

== Finals ==
=== Singles ===
Year	Champion	Runner-up	Score
↓ ILTF World Circuit event ↓
1970	(Australia) Evonne Goolagong	(Netherlands) Betty Stöve	6–1, 6–2
1971	(France) Françoise Dürr	(United States) Billie Jean King	6–3, 6–0
1972–1977	Not Held		
↓ Colgate Series event ↓
1978	(Czechoslovakia) Regina Maršíková	(West Germany) Sylvia Hanika	6–2, 6–1

=== Doubles ===
Year	Champions	Runners-up	Score
↓ ILTF World Circuit event ↓
1970	unknown		
1971	(United States) Rosemary Casals (United States) Billie Jean King	(France) Françoise Dürr (Australia) Judy Tegart	6–3, 9–7
1972–1977	Not Held		
↓ Colgate Series event ↓
1978	(Australia) Lesley Hunt (United States) Sharon Walsh	(West Germany) Katja Ebbinghaus (West Germany) Sylvia Hanika	6–1, 7–5
