= Grand Prix tennis circuit =

Tennis tour

Grand Prix Circuit
Details
- Duration: 1970–1989
- Edition: 1–19
- Categories: Group 1 Group 2 Group A Group AA; One Star; Two Star; Three Star; Four Star; Five Star; Six Star; Regular Series; Super Series; Open Week Series; Masters; Triple Crown

Achievements (singles)

The ITF Grand Prix Circuit was a professional tennis tour for male players founded in 1970 as the Grand Prix Tennis Circuit it was administered by the International Tennis Federation (ITF) and ran annually until 1989 when it and the rival WCT Circuit were replaced by a single worldwide ATP Tour.

The women's tour the ILTF Women's International Grand Prix Circuit ran from 1971 to 1976. Its events were absorbed to form the Colgate International Series.

== Background ==
Before the Open Era, popular professional tennis players, such as Suzanne Lenglen and Vincent Richards, were contracted to professional promoters. Amateur players were under the jurisdiction of their national (and international) federations. Later professional promoters, such as Bill Tilden and Jack Kramer, often convinced leading amateurs like Pancho Gonzales and Rod Laver to join their tours with promises of good prize money. But these successes led to financial difficulties when players were paid too much and falling attendances resulted in reduced takings.

In the early 1960s, the professional tour began to fall apart. It survived only because the U.S. Pro Tennis Championships, having been unable to give prize money to its 1963 winner, received prize money from the First National Bank of Boston for its 1964 tournament. At the same time, the concept of "shamateurism" – amateur promoters paying players under the table to ensure they remained amateurs – had become apparent to Herman David, the chairman of All England Club, which hosted the Wimbledon Championships.

In 1967, David announced that a professional tournament would be held at the All England Club after the 1967 Wimbledon Championships. This tournament was televised by the BBC and built public support for professional tennis. In late 1967, the best of the amateur players turned professional, paving the way for the first open tournament. Some professionals were independent at this time, such as Lew Hoad, Luis Ayala, and Owen Davidson, but most of the best players came under contract to one of two professional tours:

- The National Tennis League (NTL), run by George McCall and Fred Podesta.
  - Rod Laver, Roy Emerson, Ken Rosewall, Andrés Gimeno, Pancho Gonzales, and Fred Stolle
- World Championship Tennis (WCT), run by David F. Dixon, Albert G. Hill Jr., and Lamar Hunt.
  - Handsome Eight: John Newcombe, Tony Roche, Niki Pilić, Roger Taylor, Pierre Barthès, Butch Buchholz, Cliff Drysdale, and Dennis Ralston.

When the Open Era began in 1968, tournaments often found themselves deprived of NTL or WCT players. The first open tournament, the British Hard Court Championships at Bournemouth, was played without WCT players, as was that year's French Open. In 1970, NTL players did not play in the Australian Open because their organization did not receive a guarantee.

== Formation of the Grand Prix ==
The manipulation of Grand Slam tournaments by professional promoters at the start of the Open Era led promoter Jack Kramer, the top male tennis player in the world in the 1940s and 1950s, to conceive of the Grand Prix in 1969. He described it as "a series of tournaments with a money bonus pool that would be split up on the basis of a cumulative point system." This would encourage the best players to compete regularly in the series, so that they could share in the bonus at the end and qualify for the special championship tournament climaxing the year.

When only a few contract players showed up for the 1970 French Open, the International Lawn Tennis Federation (ILTF) approved Kramer's Grand Prix proposal. In April 1970, its president Ben Barnett announced the creation of the Grand Prix circuit, on an experimental basis during its first year.

The first World Championship Tennis tournament was held 20 January 1968 in Sydney, Australia. The first NTL tournament was held 18–21 March 1968 in São Paulo, Brazil. In July 1970, the WCT absorbed the NTL. In 1971, WCT ran a twenty-tournament circuit with the year-ending WCT Finals held in November. At the end of 1970, a panel of journalists had ranked the best players in the world. The best thirty-two men based on this ranking were invited to play the 1971 WCT circuit, which included Ilie Năstase, Stan Smith, Jan Kodeš, Željko Franulović, and Clark Graebner.

The Australian Open was part of the WCT circuit while the French Open, Wimbledon and the US Open were Grand Prix events. The conflict between the ILTF (running the Grand Prix) and WCT was so strong that Rosewall, Gimeno, Laver, Emerson, and other WCT players boycotted the 1971 US Open. The third professional circuit that year was the U. S. Indoor Circuit run by Bill Riordan, the future manager of Jimmy Connors.

In July 1971, the ILTF voted to ban all WCT contract professionals from competing in ILTF tournaments and from using ILTF facilities from the beginning of 1972 onwards. The 1972 editions of the French Open and the Wimbledon Championships excluded all contract professional players. Then in April 1972, the ILTF and WCT agreed to dovetail the 1973 tour calendar into a WCT circuit that ran from January through May and a Grand Prix circuit that ran for the rest of the year the agreement was initially for an eight year period. The conflict between the ILTF and WCT led all tennis players to attend the 1972 US Open where they agreed to form their own syndicate, the Association of Tennis Professionals (ATP), through the efforts of Jack Kramer, Donald Dell, and Cliff Drysdale.

In 1973, there were four rival professional circuits: the WCT circuit battled with the U. S. Indoor Circuit from January to April and the Grand Prix until July; both tours competed with the "ATP European Spring Circuit" until June.

In that same year, the ATP created controversy by calling for a boycott of the 1973 Wimbledon Championships after one of its members, Niki Pilić, was suspended by the Yugoslav Tennis Federation for failing to play in a Davis Cup tie against New Zealand. The ATP boycott went ahead after negotiations failed, with only three members of the organisation – Roger Taylor, Ilie Năstase, and Ray Keldie – breaking the picket. They were later fined for this. The men's draws for that year were subsequently made up of second-string players, lucky losers, and older players such as Neale Fraser, who reached the final of the men's doubles with fellow Australian John Cooper. The draw also showcased future talents such as Björn Borg, Vijay Amritraj, Sandy Mayer, and John Lloyd amid record crowds.

=== Governance ===
The governance of the Grand Prix was led by the Men's International Professional Tennis Council (MIPTC) from 1974 through 1989. (Its name was shortened to the Men's Tennis Council (MTC) in 1988.) The MIPTC's duties included imposing fines for violations of its Code of Conduct, drug testing, and administrating the Grand Prix circuit. It also moved the Australian Open from its December date – which had been adopted in 1977 so that it could be included in the Grand Prix points system – to January for the 1987 edition so that the Grand Prix Masters could be held in December from 1986 onwards. It failed, however, to prevent the number of tournaments on the Grand Prix circuit from growing, with 48 being held in 1974 compared to 75 in 1989.

== Integration and the end ==
The WCT and Grand Prix circuits were separate until 1978, when the Grand Prix circuit integrated the WCT circuit. In 1982, the WCT circuit split from the Grand Prix again and created a more complex WCT ranking, similar to the ATP ranking. The split was short-lived, however, and in 1985 the Grand Prix absorbed the four remaining WCT tournaments.

During the 1988 US Open the ATP, led by then-World No. 1 Mats Wilander, staged an impromptu meeting known as the "Parking Lot Press Conference" during failed negotiations with the MTC over the organisation of the Grand Prix and key issues such as player fatigue. During this press conference, the ATP declared that it would be starting its own tour in 1990, meaning that the 1989 Grand Prix would effectively be its last. The final event of the Grand Prix was the Nabisco Masters Doubles held at the Royal Albert Hall 6–10 December 1989. Its last champions were Jim Grabb and Patrick McEnroe, who beat John Fitzgerald and Anders Järryd in the final.

=== Formation of the ATP Tour ===
In 1990, the Association of Tennis Professionals, led by Hamilton Jordan, replaced the MTC as the sole governing body of men's professional tennis and the ATP Tour was born. The nine most prestigious Grand Prix tournaments became known as the "Championship Series Single Week" from 1990 through 1995. In 1996, Mercedes began sponsoring these series of events, renamed as the "Super 9" until 1999. In 2000, they became known as the "Tennis Masters Series" until 2004, then the "ATP Masters Series" until 2009. They are now called the ATP Masters 1000 tournaments. Grand Prix tournaments below this level were originally called the Grand Prix Super Series. They were retained by the ATP and renamed as the "Championship Series". All remaining Grand Prix Tour events became part of the "World Series".

== Seasons and sponsors ==
Based on USLTA Tennis Yearbooks and Guides and World of Tennis yearbooks the history of sponsors is as follows:

- 1970 Pepsi-Cola Grand Prix
- 1971 Pepsi-Cola Grand Prix
- 1972 Commercial Union Assurance Grand Prix
- 1973 Commercial Union Assurance Grand Prix
- 1974 Commercial Union Assurance Grand Prix
- 1975 Commercial Union Assurance Grand Prix
- 1976 Commercial Union Assurance Grand Prix
- 1977 Colgate-Palmolive Grand Prix
- 1978 Colgate-Palmolive Grand Prix
- 1979 Colgate-Palmolive Grand Prix
- 1980 Volvo Grand Prix
- 1981 Volvo Grand Prix
- 1982 Volvo Grand Prix
- 1983 Volvo Grand Prix
- 1984 Volvo Grand Prix
- 1985 Nabisco Grand Prix
- 1986 Nabisco Grand Prix
- 1987 Nabisco Grand Prix
- 1988 Nabisco Grand Prix
- 1989 Nabisco Grand Prix

== Season-end rankings ==
NB: All rankings were calculated using the Grand Prix points system and do not necessarily reflect the ATP rankings at the same time.

1970
1. (United States) C. Richey
2. (United States) A. Ashe
3. (Australia) K. Rosewall
4. (Australia) R. Laver
5. (United States) S. Smith
6. (Socialist Federal Republic of Yugoslavia) Ž. Franulović
7. (Australia) J. Newcombe
8. (Czechoslovakia) J. Kodeš
9. (Australia) T. Roche
10. (Australia) B. Carmichael
1971
1. (United States) S. Smith
2. (Romania) I. Năstase
3. (Socialist Federal Republic of Yugoslavia) Ž. Franulović
4. (Czechoslovakia) J. Kodeš
5. (United States) C. Richey
6. (Australia) J. Newcombe
7. (France) P. Barthès
8. (Australia) K. Rosewall
9. (United States) C. Graebner
10. (United States) To. Gorman
1972
1. (Romania) I. Năstase
2. (United States) S. Smith
3. (Spain) M. Orantes
4. (Czechoslovakia) J. Kodeš
5. (Spain) A. Gimeno
6. (South Africa) B. Hewitt
7. (United States) J. Connors
8. (United States) To. Gorman
9. (Rhodesia) A. Pattison
10. (France) P. Proisy
1973
1. (Romania) I. Năstase
2. (Australia) J. Newcombe
3. (Netherlands) T. Okker
4. (United States) J. Connors
5. (Spain) M. Orantes
6. (Czechoslovakia) J. Kodeš
7. (United States) S. Smith
8. (United States) To. Gorman
9. (Sweden) B. Borg
10. (United States) A. Ashe
1974
1. (Argentina) G. Vilas
2. (United States) J. Connors
3. (Spain) M. Orantes
4. (Sweden) B. Borg
5. (Mexico) R. Ramírez
6. (Romania) I. Năstase
7. (Australia) O. Parun
8. (United States) H. Solomon
9. (United States) A. Ashe
10. (United States) S. Smith

1975
1. (Argentina) G. Vilas
2. (Spain) M. Orantes
3. (Sweden) B. Borg
4. (United States) A. Ashe
5. (Romania) I. Năstase
6. (United States) J. Connors
7. (Mexico) R. Ramírez
8. (Italy) A. Panatta
9. (United States) H. Solomon
10. (United States) E. Dibbs
1976
1. (Mexico) R. Ramírez
2. (Spain) M. Orantes
3. (United States) J. Connors
4. (United States) E. Dibbs
5. (United States) H. Solomon
6. (Argentina) G. Vilas
7. (United States) R. Tanner
8. (Poland) W. Fibak
9. (United States) B. Gottfried
10. (Sweden) B. Borg
1977
1. (Argentina) G. Vilas
2. (United States) B. Gottfried
3. (Sweden) B. Borg
4. (Spain) M. Orantes
5. (United States) E. Dibbs
6. (United States) R. Tanner
7. (Mexico) R. Ramírez
8. (United States) J. Connors
9. (United States) V. Gerulaitis
10. (United States) H. Solomon
1978
1. (United States) J. Connors
2. (Sweden) B. Borg
3. (United States) E. Dibbs
4. (Mexico) R. Ramírez
5. (United States) H. Solomon
6. (United States) J. McEnroe
7. (Argentina) G. Vilas
8. (United States) B. Gottfried
9. (Italy) C. Barazzutti
10. (United States) A. Ashe
1979
1. (United States) J. McEnroe
2. (Sweden) B. Borg
3. (United States) J. Connors
4. (Argentina) G. Vilas
5. (United States) V. Gerulaitis
6. (United States) R. Tanner
7. (Spain) J. Higueras
8. (United States) H. Solomon
9. (United States) E. Dibbs
10. (Paraguay) V. Pecci

1980
1. (United States) J. McEnroe
2. (Czechoslovakia) I. Lendl
3. (United States) J. Connors
4. (Sweden) B. Borg
5. (United States) G. Mayer
6. (United States) H. Solomon
7. (Argentina) G. Vilas
8. (Argentina) J. L. Clerc
9. (United States) E. Teltscher
10. (United States) B. Teacher
1981
1. (Czechoslovakia) I. Lendl
2. (United States) J. McEnroe
3. (United States) J. Connors
4. (Argentina) J. L. Clerc
5. (Argentina) G. Vilas
6. (Sweden) B. Borg
7. (United States) R. Tanner
8. (United States) E. Teltscher
9. (United States) V. Gerulaitis
10. (France) Y. Noah
1982
1. (United States) J. Connors
2. (Argentina) G. Vilas
3. (Czechoslovakia) I. Lendl
4. (United States) J. McEnroe
5. (Sweden) M. Wilander
6. (United States) V. Gerulaitis
7. (Spain) J. Higueras
8. (South Africa) J. Kriek
9. (Ecuador) A. Gómez
10. (United States) S. Denton
1983
1. (Sweden) M. Wilander
2. (Czechoslovakia) I. Lendl
3. (United States) J. McEnroe
4. (United States) J. Connors
5. (France) Y. Noah
6. (United States) J. Arias
7. (Spain) J. Higueras
8. (Ecuador) A. Gómez
9. (Argentina) J. L. Clerc
10. (United States) E. Teltscher
1984
1. (United States) J. McEnroe
2. (United States) J. Connors
3. (Czechoslovakia) I. Lendl
4. (Sweden) M. Wilander
5. (Ecuador) A. Gómez
6. (Sweden) J. Nyström
7. (Sweden) H. Sundström
8. (United States) E. Teltscher
9. (Sweden) A. Järryd
10. (Czechoslovakia) T. Šmíd

1985
1. (Czechoslovakia) I. Lendl
2. (United States) J. McEnroe
3. (Sweden) M. Wilander
4. (Sweden) S. Edberg
5. (West Germany) B. Becker
6. (United States) J. Connors
7. (France) Y. Noah
8. (Sweden) A. Järryd
9. (South Africa) J. Kriek
10. (Sweden) J. Nyström
1986
1. (Czechoslovakia) I. Lendl
2. (West Germany) B. Becker
3. (Sweden) S. Edberg
4. (Sweden) J. Nyström
5. (France) Y. Noah
6. (Sweden) M. Wilander
7. (France) H. Leconte
8. (Ecuador) A. Gómez
9. (United States) J. Connors
10. (Slovakia) M. Mečíř
1987
1. (Czechoslovakia) I. Lendl
2. (Sweden) S. Edberg
3. (Sweden) M. Wilander
4. (Slovakia) M. Mečíř
5. (West Germany) B. Becker
6. (United States) J. Connors
7. (Australia) P. Cash
8. (United States) B. Gilbert
9. (United States) T. Mayotte
10. (Ecuador) A. Gómez
1988
1. (Sweden) M. Wilander
2. (West Germany) B. Becker
3. (Sweden) S. Edberg
4. (United States) A. Agassi
5. (Czechoslovakia) I. Lendl
6. (France) H. Leconte
7. (United States) J. Connors
8. (United States) T. Mayotte
9. (Switzerland) J. Hlasek
10. (Sweden) K. Carlsson
1989
1. (Czechoslovakia) I. Lendl
2. (West Germany) B. Becker
3. (Sweden) S. Edberg
4. (United States) B. Gilbert
5. (United States) J. McEnroe
6. (United States) M. Chang
7. (United States) A. Agassi
8. (United States) A. Krickstein
9. (Argentina) A. Mancini
10. (United States) J. Berger

=== Grand Prix circuit winners ===
Titles	Player	Years
5	(Czechoslovakia) Ivan Lendl	1981, 1985, 1986, 1987, 1989
3	(United States) John McEnroe	1979, 1980, 1984
3	(Argentina) Guillermo Vilas	1974, 1975, 1977
2	(United States) Jimmy Connors	1978, 1982
2	(Romania) Ilie Nastase	1972, 1973
2	(Sweden) Mats Wilander	1983, 1988
1	(Mexico) Raúl Ramírez	1976
1	(United States) Cliff Richey	1970
1	(United States) Stan Smith	1971

== See also ==
- ATP Tour
- History of tennis
- International Tennis Federation
- ILTF Women's International Grand Prix Circuit
- Tennis Pro Tours
- World Championship Tennis
- WCT Circuit
