= List of nicknames used in tennis =

This is a list of verified common nicknames that notable professional tennis players were personally addressed by. Some are group names collectively referring to more than one player.

== A ==
- Ace Queen = Karolína Plíšková
- The Arm, The Aussie Amazon, Mighty Maggie = Margaret Court
- A-Rod, Rocket Man = Andy Roddick

== B ==
- Baby Fed = Grigor Dimitrov
- Big Three, The Three Tenors, GOATs= Roger Federer, Rafael Nadal, Novak Djokovic
- Boom Boom Boris, The Lion of Leimen, Baron von Slam = Boris Becker
- The Barcelona Bumblebee = Arantxa Sánchez Vicario
- "Le basque bondissant" (French for "The Leaping Basque") = Jean Borotra
- Bee = Barbora Strycova
- Big, Bad Betty = Betty Stöve
- The Big Cat = Miloslav Mečíř
- Big Bill = William Tilden Jr.
- Big Foe = Frances Tiafoe
- Big Pancho = Pancho Gonzales
- Broadway Vitas = Vitas Gerulaitis
- The Bulldozer = David Ferrer
- Butch = Earl Buchholz

== C ==
- California Comet = Maurice McLoughlin
- Can't-miss-Swiss/swiss miss = Martina Hingis
- El Chino (Spanish for "The Chinese") = Marcelo Ríos
- Chucky = Martina Hingis
- Clown Prince of Tennis = Frank Kovacs
- The Crocodile = René Lacoste
- Carlitos = Carlos Alcaraz

== D ==
- Danimal = Danielle Collins
- DelPo = Juan Martín del Potro
- The Demon = Alex de Minaur
- (The) Djoker, Nole, Serbinator, Robocup = Novak Djokovic
- Dominator, The Prince of Clay = Dominic Thiem
- Dreddy = Dustin Brown
- La divine (French for "The Goddess"), The Maid Marvel = Suzanne Lenglen

== E ==
- Emmo = Roy Emerson
- El Peque = Diego Schwartzman
- El Pelon= Rafael Osuna
- Evonne Sing-A-Long, Sunshine Super Girl = Evonne Goolagong Cawley

== F ==
- Fat Dave, El Rey David = David Nalbandian
- FedEx(press), The King, The Maestro, God of tennis, The G.O.A.T = Roger Federer
- Fiery or Fiery Fred = Fred Stolle
- The Flying Dutchman = Tom Okker
- Fox, Carrot, Jannik The Merciless = Jannik Sinner
- The Four Musketeers =
  - Jean Borotra
  - Jacques Brugnon
  - Henri Cochet
  - René Lacoste
- Fräulein Forehand = Steffi Graf

== G ==
- Gentleman Jack = Jack Crawford
- Gorgeous Gussie = Gertrude Moran
- The Great Dane = Caroline Wozniacki
- Guga, Clay Surfer = Gustavo Kuerten
- The Generator = Jennifer Capriati
- Gonzo = Fernando González

== H ==
- Handsome Eight =
  - Pierre Barthès
  - Butch Buchholz
  - Cliff Drysdale
  - John Newcombe
  - Nikola Pilić
  - Dennis Ralston
  - Tony Roche
  - Roger Taylor

== I ==
- Ivan the Terrible, The Terminator = Ivan Lendl
- Indian Express =
  - Mahesh Bhupathi
  - Leander Paes
- Ice Borg or Ice Man = Björn Borg
- Ice Maiden, Ice Princess = Chris Evert

== J ==
- Jimbo = Jimmy Connors
- Juju = Justine Henin

== K ==
- The King of Clay, Phenomenadal, El Matador (Spanish for "The Killer"), Raging Bull, el Toro de Manacor = Rafael Nadal

== L ==
- The Las Vegas Kid, The Punisher = Andre Agassi
- The Leaning Tower of Pasadena = Stan Smith
- The Lithuanian Lion = Vitas Gerulaitis
- Little Bill = William Johnston
- Little Miss Poker Face = Helen Wills Moody
- Little Mo = Maureen Connolly
- Little Pancho = Pancho Segura

== M ==
- Madison Avenue = Madison Keys
- Masha, the (Siberian) Siren = Maria Sharapova
- The Magician = Fabrice Santoro
- Marvelous Molla = Molla Bjurstedt Mallory
- Mosquito = Juan Carlos Ferrero
- Le Mozart Noir (French for "The Black Mozart") = Yannick Noah
- Muscles = Ken Rosewall
- Musterminator = Thomas Muster
- Muhammad Ali, Smokin' Jo Willy, Tsunami = Jo-Wilfried Tsonga
- Muzza = Andy Murray

== N ==
- Naochi = Naomi Osaka
- Nasty = Ilie Năstase
- Newk = John Newcombe
- Navrat the Brat = Martina Navratilova
- Ninja = Agnieszka Radwańska

== O ==
- Original 9 =
  - Billie Jean King
  - Rosemary Casals
  - Nancy Richey
  - Peaches Bartkowicz
  - Kristy Pigeon
  - Valerie Ziegenfuss
  - Julie Heldman
  - Kerry Reid
  - Judy Tegart

== P ==
- The Paignton Peach = Sue Barker
- Peanut = Mareen Louie-Harper
- Peachy = Fern Kellmeyer
- Pico = Juan Mónaco
- Pistol Pete = Pete Sampras
- The Pocket Rocket = Dominika Cibulková
- Prime Time = Grigor Dimitrov
- Psychedelic Strokeswoman = Françoise Dürr
- Pushniacki = Caroline Wozniacki

== Q ==
- Q = Wang Qiang
- Queen Vee = Venus Williams

== R ==
- The Rocket = Rod Laver
- Rusty = Lleyton Hewitt
- Rabbit = Wendy Turnbull

== S ==
- The São Paulo Swallow, the Tennis Ballerina = Maria Bueno
- Senorita Topspin = Conchita Martínez
- Scud = Mark Philippoussis
- Sliderman = Gaël Monfils
- Special Kei = Kei Nishikori
- Spice Girls =
  - Anna Kournikova
  - Martina Hingis
- Stanimal, Stan the Man = Stanislas Wawrinka
- Superbrat = John McEnroe
- Super Simo = Simona Halep
- Swiss Miss = Martina Hingis
- SW19, Meka = Serena Williams
- Somi = Aisam-ul-Haq Qureshi

== T ==
- Tabasco = Fernando Verdasco
- Tappy = Art Larsen
- The Tennis Baron = Gottfried von Cramm
- The Tiger = Aryna Sabalenka
- Tiger Tim, Timbo, Tin Man = Tim Henman
- Ted = Cuthbert Tinling
- Tomic the Tank Engine = Bernard Tomic
- The Tower of Tandil = Juan Martín del Potro

== W ==
- Wild Thing = Nick Kyrgios
- Willie = Guillermo Vilas
- The Wizard = Norman Brookes
- The Woodies =
  - Todd Woodbridge
  - Mark Woodforde

== X ==
- X-Man = Xavier Malisse

== See also ==
- Lists of nicknames
