= 1978 Toyota Women's Classic =

- Date: 4–10 December
- Edition: 3rd
- Category: Colgate Series (AA)
- Draw: 64S / 16D
- Prize money: $75,000
- Surface: Grass
- Location: Sydney, Australia
- Venue: White City Stadium

Champions

Singles
- (Australia) Dianne Fromholtz

Doubles
- (Australia) Kerry Reid (Australia) Wendy Turnbull
- WTA Sydney

The 1978 Toyota Women's Classic, was a women's tennis tournament played on outdoor grass courts at White City Stadium in Sydney in Australia. The event was part of the AA (Note: Tournaments with prize money for the women of at least $75,000.) category of the 1979 Colgate Series. It was the 3rd edition of the tournament and was held from 4 December through 10 December 1978. Fifth-seeded Dianne Fromholtz won the singles title and earned $15,000.

== Finals ==
=== Singles ===
(Australia) Dianne Fromholtz defeated (Australia) Kerry Reid 6–1, 1–6, 6–4

- It was Fromholtz' 1st singles title of the year and the 6th of her career.

=== Doubles ===
(Australia) Kerry Reid / (Australia) Wendy Turnbull defeated (New Zealand) Judy Chaloner / (United Kingdom) Anne Hobbs 6–2, 4–6, 6–2

== Prize money ==
Event	W	F	SF	QF	Round of 16	Round of 32	Round of 64
Singles	$15,000	$7,400	$3,600	$1,800	$1,000	$550	$225
