= Sylvia Hanika =

German tennis player

- Country (sports): West Germany (1959–1990); Germany (1990–present)
- Residence: La Manga, Spain
- Born: 30 November 1959 (age 66) Munich, West Germany
- Height: 1.73 m (5 ft 8 in)
- Turned pro: 1977
- Retired: 1990
- Plays: Left-handed (one handed-backhand)
- Prize money: US$ $1,296,560

Singles
- Career record: 378–223
- Career titles: 6
- Highest ranking: No. 5 (12 September 1983)

Grand Slam singles results
- Australian Open: QF (1983)
- French Open: F (1981)
- Wimbledon: 4R (1982, 1987)
- US Open: QF (1979, 1981, 1983, 1984)

Other tournaments
- Tour Finals: W (1982)

Doubles
- Career record: 47–48
- Career titles: 1
- Highest ranking: No. 92 (14 August 1989)

Sylvia Hanika (born 30 November 1959) is a former professional tennis player from Germany. She is remembered for finishing as the runner-up at the French Open in 1981 and for winning the Year End Championships in 1982. She was ranked as high as No. 5 in the world.

== Career ==
Hanika turned professional in 1977. In 1981, Hanika reached the women's singles final at the French Open, where she was defeated in two sets by Hana Mandlíková.

In 1982, Hanika posted the biggest win of her career when she defeated world No. 2 Martina Navratilova in three sets in the final of the Avon Series Championships at Madison Square Garden in New York City. The Garden was also the site of Hanika's last big singles win: a straight sets victory against No. 3 Chris Evert in the first round of the Virginia Slims Championships in 1987.

Hanika won her final top-level singles title in Athens, Greece in 1986. She retired from the tour in 1990, having won six professional singles titles and one doubles title.

Between serves, she was known to bounce the ball more than anyone tennis commentator and historian Bud Collins remembers: "as many as into the 30s. If she faulted on the first, it was awful, another 30 or so bounces."

== Major finals ==
=== Grand Slam final ===
==== Singles: (1 runner–up) ====
Result	Year	Tournament	Surface	Opponent	Score
Loss	1981	French Open	Clay	(Czechoslovakia) Hana Mandlíková	2–6, 4–6

=== Year-End Championships final ===
==== Singles: (1 title) ====
Result	Year	Tournament	Surface	Opponent	Score
Win	1982	New York City	Carpet (I)	(United States) Martina Navratilova	1–6, 6–3, 6–4

== WTA career finals ==
=== Singles: 24 (6–18) ===
Legend Grand Slam tournaments (0–1) WTA Tour Championships (1–0) Tier I (0–0) Tier II (0–0) Tier III (0–0) Tier IV (0–0) Tier V (0–2) Virginia Slims, Avon, Other (6–15)	Titles by surface Hard (0–2) Grass (0–1) Clay (2–7) Carpet (4–8)

Result	W/L	Date	Tournament	Surface	Opponent	Score
Loss	1.	Jul 1978	Båstad	Clay	(Netherlands) Elly Appel-Vessies	2–6, 4–6
Loss	2.	Jul 1978	Kitzbühel	Clay	(Romania) Virginia Ruzici	4–6, 3–6
Loss	3.	Nov 1978	Christchurch	Grass	(Czechoslovakia) Regina Maršíková	2–6, 1–6
Win	1.	Jan 1979	Boise	Carpet (i)	(United States) Sherry Acker	6–3, 6–2
Loss	4.	May 1979	Rome	Clay	(United States) Tracy Austin	4–6, 6–1, 3–6
Loss	5.	Jul 1979	Kitzbühel	Clay	(Czechoslovakia) Hana Mandlíková	6–2, 5–7, 3–6
Loss	6.	Jan 1981	Cincinnati	Carpet (i)	(Czechoslovakia) Martina Navratilova	2–6, 4–6
Win	2.	Feb 1981	Seattle	Carpet (I)	(United States) Barbara Potter	6–2, 6–4
Loss	7.	May 1981	French Open	Clay	(Czechoslovakia) Hana Mandlíková	2–6, 4–6
Loss	8.	Jul 1981	Kitzbühel	Clay	(West Germany) Claudia Kohde-Kilsch	5–7, 6–7
Win	3.	Jul 1981	Monte Carlo	Clay	(Czechoslovakia) Hana Mandlíková	2–6, 6–3, 5–6 ab.
Loss	9.	Mar 1982	Los Angeles	Carpet (i)	(Socialist Federal Republic of Yugoslavia) Mima Jaušovec	2–6, 6–7^{(4–7)}
Win	4.	Mar 1982	Avon Championships	Carpet (i)	(United States) Martina Navratilova	1–6, 6–3, 6–4
Loss	10.	Jan 1983	Washington	Carpet (i)	(United States) Martina Navratilova	1–6, 1–6
Loss	11.	Jan 1983	Houston	Carpet (i)	(United States) Martina Navratilova	3–6, 6–7^{(5–7)}
Loss	12.	Feb 1983	Oakland	Carpet (i)	(West Germany) Bettina Bunge	3–6, 3–6
Loss	13.	Mar 1983	Boston	Carpet (I)	(Australia) Wendy Turnbull	4–6, 6–3, 4–6
Loss	14.	Sep 1983	Hartford	Carpet (i)	(United States) Kim Shaefer	4–6, 3–6
Win	5.	Oct 1984	Brighton	Carpet (I)	(United States) JoAnne Russell	6–3, 1–6, 6–2
Win	6.	Sep 1986	Athens	Clay	(Greece) Angelikí Kanellopoúlou	7–5, 6–1
Loss	15.	Feb 1987	San Francisco	Carpet (i)	(United States) Zina Garrison	5–7, 6–4, 3–6
Loss	16.	Aug 1987	Mahwah	Hard	(Bulgaria) Manuela Maleeva	6–1, 4–6, 1–6
Loss	17.	Feb 1988	Wichita	Hard (i)	(Bulgaria) Manuela Maleeva	6–7^{(5–7)}, 5–7
Loss	18.	Jul 1988	Aix-en-Provence	Clay	(Austria) Judith Wiesner	1–6, 2–6

=== Doubles: 3 (1–2) ===
Legend Grand Slam tournaments (0–0) WTA Tour Championships (0–0) Tier I (0–0) Tier II (0–0) Tier III (0–0) Tier IV (0–0) Tier V (1–0) Virginia Slims, Avon, Other (0–2)	Titles by surface Hard (1–0) Grass (0–1) Clay (0–0) Carpet (0–1)

Result	W/L	Date	Tournament	Surface	Partner	Opponents	Score
Loss	0–1	Nov 1978	Christchurch	Grass	(West Germany) Katja Ebbinghaus	(Australia) Lesley Hunt (United States) Sharon Walsh	1–6, 5–7
Loss	0–2	Jan 1980	Chicago	Carpet (i)	(United States) Kathy Jordan	(United States) Billie Jean King (Czechoslovakia) Martina Navratilova	3–6, 4–6
Win	1–2	Nov 1988	Adelaide	Hard	(West Germany) Claudia Kohde-Kilsch	(United States) Lori McNeil (Czechoslovakia) Jana Novotná	7–5, 6–7^{(4–7)}, 6–4

== Grand Slam singles performance timeline ==
Key
W	F	SF	QF	#R	RR	Q#	DNQ	A	NH

(W) winner; (F) finalist; (SF) semifinalist; (QF) quarterfinalist; (#R) rounds 4, 3, 2, 1; (RR) round-robin stage; (Q#) qualification round; (DNQ) did not qualify; (A) absent; (NH) not held; (SR) strike rate (events won / competed); (W–L) win–loss record.

Tournament	1977		1978	1979	1980	1981	1982	1983	1984	1985	1986	1987	1988	1989	1990	Career SR
Australian Open	A	A	A	A	3R	A	A	QF	2R	A	NH	4R	4R	1R	A	0 / 6
French Open	A		1R	1R	3R	F	2R	3R	3R	4R	1R	4R	4R	4R	2R	0 / 13
Wimbledon	A		2R	3R	2R	1R	4R	3R	1R	2R	1R	4R	3R	1R	A	0 / 12
US Open	A		1R	QF	3R	QF	A	QF	QF	3R	2R	4R	3R	3R	2R	0 / 12
SR	0 / 0		0 / 3	0 / 3	0 / 4	0 / 3	0 / 2	0 / 4	0 / 4	0 / 3	0 / 3	0 / 4	0 / 4	0 / 4	0 / 2	0 / 43
Year-end Ranking	118		35	16	14	6	10	6	17	21	50	14	17	41	125	

Note: The Australian Open was held twice in 1977, in January and December.

== See also ==
- Performance timelines for all female tennis players since 1978 who reached at least one Grand Slam final
