= 1978 Christchurch International =

- Date: November 20—26
- Prize money: US$35,000
- Surface: Grass
- Location: Christchurch, New Zealand

Champions

Singles
- (Czechoslovakia) Regina Maršíková

Doubles
- (Australia) Lesley Hunt / (United States) Sharon Walsh
| ← 1971 · | Christchurch International |

The 1978 Christchurch International (sponsored as the Colgate International) was a tennis tournament organised for female professional tennis players. It was the 3rd edition of the WTA Christchurch tournament, and the 1st since 1972, as it was cancelled during 1972–77, and this was the first time the event was a professional tournament and offered prize money and ranking points, upgraded from the non-tour event in the first two editions.

Although held from 20–26 November 1978, it was part of the 1979 women's tennis season.

Regina Maršíková of Czechoslovakia won the singles, and Australian–American duo Lesley Hunt and Sharon Walsh won the doubles.

== Results ==
=== Singles ===
==== Finals ====
Semifinals
(Czechoslovakia) Regina Maršíková | 4 | 6 | 6
(United States) Lea Antonoplis | 6 | 4 | 4
(Germany) Sylvia Hanika | 6 | 6
(Sweden) Mimmi Wikstedt | 1 | 2

Final
(Czechoslovakia) Regina Maršíková | 6 | 6
(Germany) Sylvia Hanika | 2 | 1

==== Section 1 ====
First round
(Canada) W Barlow | 6 | 6
(Switzerland) C Jolissaint | 3 | 2
(United States) P Bostrom | 6 | 6
(Japan) S Yonezawa | 2 | 0
(Sweden) N Bohm | 6 | 6
(West Germany) K Ebbinghaus | 4 | 3
(Mexico) A Vallejo | 6 | 1
(France) B Simon | 7 | 6

Second round
(Czechoslovakia) R Maršíková | 6 | 7
(Canada) W Barlow | 3 | 5
(United States) P Bostrom | 1 | 2
(West Germany) I Riedel-Kühn | 6 | 6
(United Kingdom) A Hobbs | 6 | 6
(Sweden) N Bohm | 3 | 1
(Denmark) H Sparre-Viragh | 7 | 6 | 6
(France) B Simon | 5 | 7 | 3

Third round
(Czechoslovakia) R Maršíková | 6 | 6
(West Germany) I Riedel-Kühn | 1 | 1
(United Kingdom) A Hobbs | 6 | 6
(Denmark) H Sparre-Viragh | 3 | 0

Quarterfinals
(Czechoslovakia) R Maršíková | 6 | 6
(United Kingdom) A Hobbs | 3 | 3

==== Section 2 ====
First round
Q | (Denmark) D Ekner | 0 | 6 | 5
(France) G Lovera | 6 | 3 | 7
(Switzerland) A-M Rüegg | 2 | 2
(Japan) K Nomura | 6 | 6
(Switzerland) M Simmen | 4 | 0
(Japan) N Sato | 6 | 6
(Czechoslovakia) H Mandlíková | 7 | 6
Q | (Denmark) A-M Sorensen | 5 | 2

Second round
(United Kingdom) M Tyler | 2 | 0 | r
(France) G Lovera | 6 | 2
(United States) L Antonoplis | 6 | 6
(Japan) K Nomura | 3 | 2
(Japan) N Sato | 7 | 2 | 6
(Italy) S Simmonds | 5 | 6 | 4
(Czechoslovakia) H Mandlíková | 3 | 2
(United States) S Walsh | 6 | 6

Third round
(France) G Lovera | 4 | 4
(United States) L Antonoplis | 6 | 6
(Japan) N Sato | 6 | 6
(United States) S Walsh | 3 | 2

Quarterfinals
(United States) L Antonoplis | 6 | 6
(Japan) N Sato | 2 | 3

==== Section 3 ====
First round
(Germany) R Tomanová | 6 | 6
(Denmark) B Hermansen | 1 | 3
(Germany) S Hanika | 6 | 6
(Argentina) C Casabianca | 1 | 2
(New Zealand) C Newton | 5 | 3
(United States) J Stratton | 7 | 6
(Italy) D Porzio | 4 | 0
(Argentina) V González | 1 | 0r

Second round
(Germany) R Tomanová | 6 | 6
(Sweden) E Ekblom | 1 | 2
(Germany) S Hanika | 6 | 6
(Australia) P Whytcross | 3 | 3
(Australia) A Tobin | 4 | 6 | 6
(United States) J Stratton | 6 | 1 | 7
(Argentina) I Madruga | 6 | 6
(Italy) D Porzio | 4 | 1

Third round
(Germany) R Tomanová | 5 | 2
(Germany) S Hanika | 7 | 6
(United States) J Stratton | 3 | 6 | 6
(Argentina) I Madruga | 6 | 1 | 2

Quarterfinals
(Germany) S Hanika | 6 | 6
(United States) J Stratton | 2 | 1

==== Section 4 ====
First round
(France) F Thibault | 4 | 7 | 3
(Argentina) R Giscafré | 6 | 5 | 6
(New Zealand) B Perry | 2 | 4
(Sweden) M Wikstedt | 6 | 6
(Australia) S Saliba | 2 | 7 | 3
(New Zealand) J Chaloner | 6 | 5 | 6
(Germany) H Eisterlehner | 6 | 7
(Switzerland) P Delhees | 3 | 6

Second round
(Czechoslovakia) H Strachoňová | 1 | 6 | 6
(Argentina) R Giscafré | 6 | 2 | 2
(Sweden) M Wikstedt | 6 | 6
(Belgium) M Gurdal | 2 | 4
(New Zealand) J Chaloner | 6 | 6
(Canada) M Blackwood | 1 | 3
(Germany) H Eisterlehner | 0 | 6 | 3
(Australia) L Hunt | 6 | 2 | 6

Third round
(Czechoslovakia) H Strachoňová | 0 | 6 | 4
(Sweden) M Wikstedt | 6 | 2 | 6
(New Zealand) J Chaloner | 3 | 5
(Australia) L Hunt | 6 | 7

Quarterfinals
(Sweden) M Wikstedt | 4 | 6 | 6
(Australia) L Hunt | 6 | 4 | 4
