= 1977 Colgate International of Australia =

- Date: 14–20 November
- Edition: 2nd
- Category: Colgate Series (AAA)
- Draw: 32S / 16D
- Prize money: $100,000
- Surface: Grass
- Location: Sydney, Australia
- Venue: White City Stadium

Champions

Singles
- (Australia) Evonne Goolagong Cawley

Doubles
- (Australia) Evonne Goolagong Cawley (Netherlands) Betty Stöve (Australia) Kerry Reid (South Africa) Greer Stevens
- WTA Sydney

The 1977 Colgate International of Australia, was a women's tennis tournament played on outdoor grass courts at White City Stadium in Sydney in Australia. The event was part of the AAA (Note: Tournaments with prize money for the women of at least $100,000.) category of the 1978 Colgate Series. It was the second edition of the tournament and was held from 14 November through 20 November 1977. Eighth-seeded Evonne Goolagong Cawley, participating in her first tournament after a year absence due to the birth of her first child, won the singles title and earned $22,000 first-prize money and 160 ranking points.

== Finals ==
=== Singles ===
(Australia) Evonne Goolagong Cawley defeated (Australia) Kerry Reid 6–1, 6–3

- It was Goolagong Cawley's 1st title of the year and the 67th of her career.

=== Doubles ===
(Australia) Evonne Goolagong Cawley / (Netherlands) Betty Stöve vs. (Australia) Kerry Reid / (South Africa) Greer Stevens divided (Note: Goolagong Cawley and Stöve were leading in the final 6–2, 1–3 when the match was cancelled due to rain. Both teams received $4,500 prize money.)

== Prize money ==
Event	W	F	SF	QF	Round of 16	Round of 32
Singles	$22,000	$11,000	$5,500	$2,650	$1,300	$700
