= Original 9 =

Founding members of tennis tour Virginia Slims Circuit

The Original 9 were a group of nine women's professional tennis players who broke away from the governing bodies of tennis in 1970 to launch their own professional tour, the Virginia Slims Circuit, which later evolved into the modern WTA Tour.

The Original 9 were inducted as a group into the International Tennis Hall of Fame as part of the Class of 2021.

== Players ==
"BJ and Rosie were the ringleaders on court, close friends, doubles partners frequent final–round foes, super saleswomen for the emerging tour. They were perfect role players, feisty but good humored kids off the public courts who believed women had a destiny in professional sport."

— Bud Collins
- Peaches Bartkowicz: Winner of the USA Girls under-18 national title three times in a row, equalling Sarah Palfrey's record. Bartkowicz had won Junior Wimbledon and had won medals at the 1968 Olympic Games exhibitions.
- Rosie Casals: The reigning Wimbledon Doubles and Mixed Doubles Champions in 1970. She had finished as the runner up in the Australian and French Opens in the doubles, and in the mixed doubles at the US Open. Also, Casals won the US Open doubles title, and in 1970 reached the final of the singles competition. Casals states "I got $3,750 when I lost the 1970 US Open final to Court, the last victim in her Grand Slam." When Casals was 18, Harry Hopman labeled her the best junior prospect in the world. She stated 40 years later, "Jeopardizing the chance to play Grand Slams was probably the riskiest part of going against the old establishment. What else were we risking? We were really second class citizens when we played at the sanctioned tournaments alongside the men, and that meant all tournaments. In that sense we didn't have a lot to lose. On the other hand, the Grand Slams were everything to us at that time."
- Judy Dalton: Had just completed a career Grand Slam in Women's doubles as she had won the US Open, the only title missing from her collection at that point. Dalton was part of Australia's winning Federation Cup team in 1970. "Before there was a Tour, I actually worked as an accountant when I wasn't playing tennis. In those days, the Lawn Tennis Association of Australia wouldn't let any of us—men or women—play more than six months of the year. These days that would be called restraint of trade!" On the money Dalton said, "I know exactly what I did with my prize money from Houston. My husband, David, and I had just bought a house in Melbourne, and I sent most of it home to help pay it off." With regard to the personal sanctions against her, she said, "I couldn't play with my Slazenger racquet, we couldn't play in tournaments. In fairness, Wilson was fantastic—they gave us all the stuff that we wanted and did what they could to help. From memory, I used Wilson racquets for two years."
- Julie Heldman: The daughter of the leader Gladys. Heldman was a three-time Canadian Junior Champion and a US junior champion. Heldman was a runner-up at one of the Olympic exhibitions to Bartkowicz. Heldman had won the prestigious Canadian and Italian Opens in the 1960s. Heldman in 1970 had her best run at a Grand Slam to date as she reached the semifinals of the French Open. Heldman, however, was injured and therefore did not participate in the competition. "That's my abiding memory of that time: the sense of solidarity and a step forward. I couldn't play because I had an elbow injury. My parents had just moved from New York to Houston, and I was in the new house manning the phones the night before the tournament was due to start. The women were calling and saying the USTA was threatening to suspend everybody. The morning the tournament was due to start, I didn't go to the site because I wasn't playing. But when I heard everyone had stood in solidarity I decided I would do the same, even if it meant being suspended too."

"We knew we were making history and we had such a strong sense of purpose. I just kept thinking about the vision we had for the future of our sport. We wanted to ensure that any girl in the world that was good enough would have a place to go and make a living playing tennis."

— Billie Jean King speaking in 2010.
- Billie Jean King: Former Australian and US Open champion and three time Wimbledon champion. King was also the reigning Wimbledon doubles champion and the reigning French Open mixed doubles champion. At this stage in her career, King already had a career Grand Slam in mixed doubles and only needed the French Open to repeat the feat in singles play. King was considered the ring leader amongst the players.
- Kerry Melville: At just 23, had just broken into the world's top ten when she joined King and Heldman. In 1970, she also managed to reach the final of her home Slam, her first final, but lost to Margaret Court. Forty years later she stated, "Houston felt like the start of something, and I remember being excited. I was just a little ol' Aussie... I wanted a better deal, of course, but I wouldn't put myself in the feminist category. I went a lot by what Judy (Dalton) did; it was good having her around. I think my parents were a little concerned, but I felt that with Billie Jean we had a strong leader."
- Kristy Pigeon: Winner of Junior US Open and Junior Wimbledon titles in her career. Pigeon reached the fourth round at Wimbledon in 1968 and 1969. She was 20 years old when she took a stand against the establishment. She later stated, "I think a lot of those original true feminists were missing the point by burning bras. In a way, they didn't make nearly as many waves as we tennis players did. We demonstrated that as sportspeople we were as interesting as the men. Our competition was stimulating to watch and we could pull the people in. For me, that's a more powerful way of establishing equality."
- Nancy Richey: Two time singles Grand Slam champion and multiple doubles champ; she was 28 in 1970. Richey said 40 years later of the events, "I still feel the same way as I did then about the inequities. It was so unfair, we were so discriminated against. Some of the men players were upset that we were getting any of the prize money at the tournaments that were being held jointly. If the purse was $10,000, they were getting $8,500. It was that kind of ratio. And they were pretty vocal about it. They'd say, 'Well go out and get your own circuit and stop taking the money from us."
- Valerie Ziegenfuss: Reached the fourth round of the US Open in 1969 and the third round at Wimbledon in 1970. She won $300 for her loss to Casals.

Two other players withdrew from the event: Patti Hogan withdrew because she did not want to take the risk and stand against the establishment. Margaret Court, who, after completing her Grand Slam, had just lost in Charlotte to Chris Evert, who was 15 at the time, withdrew due to a left ankle injury which sidelined her for three months. She was replaced by Pigeon.

== See also ==
- 1970 Houston Women's Invitation
- Virginia Slims Circuit
