= Association of Tennis Professionals =

Men's professional tennis governing body

- Sport: Professional tennis
- Jurisdiction: International
- Abbreviation: ATP
- Founded: September 1972; 54 years ago
- Headquarters: Atlantic Beach, Florida
- Location: United Kingdom (HQ); Monaco; United States; Australia
- Chairman: Andrea Gaudenzi
- CEO: Eno Polo
- Secretary: Brett Byron
- Replaced: Men's International Professional Tennis Council (MTC)
- (founded): 1974

Official website
- www.atptour.com
- Current season: 2026 ATP Tour; 2026 ATP Challenger Tour

The Association of Tennis Professionals (ATP) is the governing body of the men's professional tennis circuits – the ATP Tour and the ATP Challenger Tour. It was formed in September 1972 by Donald Dell, Jack Kramer, and Cliff Drysdale to protect the interests of professional tennis players, and Drysdale became the first president. Since 1990, the association has organized the ATP Tour, the worldwide tennis tour for men, and linked the title of the tour with the organization's name. It is the governing body of men's professional tennis. In 1990 the organization was called the ATP Tour, which was renamed in 2001 as just ATP and the tour being called ATP Tour. In 2009 the name of the tour was changed again and was known as the ATP World Tour, but changed again to the ATP Tour by 2019. It is an evolution of the tour competitions previously known as Grand Prix tennis tournaments and World Championship Tennis (WCT). The ATP's global headquarters are in London. ATP Americas is based in Ponte Vedra Beach, Florida; ATP Europe is headquartered in Monaco; and ATP International, which covers Africa, Asia and Australasia, is based in Sydney, Australia.

== Early history ==
Launched in 1972 by Jack Kramer, Donald Dell, and Cliff Drysdale, it was first managed by Jack Kramer, as executive director, and Cliff Drysdale, as president. Jim McManus was a founding member. Kramer created the professional players' rankings system, which started the following year and is still in use. From 1974 to 1989, the men's circuit was administered by a sub-committee called the Men's International Professional Tennis Council (MIPTC). It was made up of representatives of World Tennis (then known as the International Tennis Federation), the ATP, and tournament directors from around the world. The ATP successfully requested that the MIPTC introduce a drug testing rule, making tennis the first professional sport to institute a drug-testing program.

=== 1973 Wimbledon boycott ===
In May 1973 Nikola Pilić, Yugoslavia's number one tennis player, was suspended by his national lawn tennis association, who claimed he had refused to play in a Davis Cup tie for his country earlier that month. The initial suspension of nine months, supported by the International Lawn Tennis Federation (ILTF), was later reduced by the ILTF to one month which meant that Pilić would not be allowed to play at Wimbledon.

In response, the ATP threatened a boycott, stating that if Pilić was not allowed to compete, none should. After last-ditch attempts at a compromise failed, the ATP voted in favor of a boycott and as a result, 81 of the top players, including reigning champion Stan Smith and 13 of the 16 men's seeds, did not compete at the 1973 Wimbledon Championships. Three ATP players, Ilie Năstase, Roger Taylor and Ray Keldie, defied the boycott and were fined by the ATP's disciplinary committee.

=== 1988 breakaway ===
The tour was still run by the tournament directors and the ITF. The limited player representation and influence within the Men's International Professional Tennis Council (MIPTC) as well as dissatisfaction with the way the sport was managed and marketed culminated in a player mutiny in 1988 led by active tennis pros, including then world number one ranked Mats Wilander which changed the entire structure of the tour.

CEO Hamilton Jordan is credited with the "Parking Lot Press Conference" on 26 August 1988 during which the ATP announced their withdrawal from the MIPTC (then called the MTC) and the creation of their ATP Tour from 1990 onwards. This re-organisation also ended a lawsuit with Volvo and Donald Dell. On 19 January 1989 the ATP published the calendar for the inaugural 1990 season.

By 1991, the men had their first television package to broadcast 19 tournaments. Coming online with their first website in 1995, this was followed by a multi-year agreement with Mercedes-Benz. Lawsuits in 2008, around virtually the same issues, resulted in a restructured tour.

=== 2022 reaction to Russian invasion ===
In reaction to the 2022 Russian invasion of Ukraine, the Association of Tennis Professionals (ATP) moved the 2022 St. Petersburg Open from Saint Petersburg to Kazakhstan. In May 2022, the ATP stripped the Wimbledon tournament of its world ranking points over the tournament's decision to decline entries from Russian and Belarusian players. The UK Culture Secretary, Nadine Dorries, commented that the ATP's decision would send the "completely wrong message to both Putin and the people of Ukraine".

== Tournaments ==
The ATP Tour comprises ATP Masters 1000, ATP 500, and ATP 250. The ATP also oversees the ATP Challenger Tour, a level below the ATP Tour, and the ATP Champions Tour for seniors. Grand Slam tournaments, a small portion of the Olympic tennis tournament, the Davis Cup, the Hopman Cup and the introductory level Futures tournaments do not fall under the auspices of the ATP, but are overseen by World Tennis instead and the International Olympic Committee (IOC) for the Olympics. In these events, however, ATP ranking points are still awarded, with the exception of the Olympics and Hopman Cup. The four-week ITF Satellite tournaments were discontinued in 2007.

Players and doubles teams with the most ranking points (collected during the calendar year) play in the season-ending ATP Finals, which, from 2000 to 2008, was run jointly with World Tennis. The details of the professional tennis tour are:

Event	Number	Total prize money (USD)	Winner's ranking points	Governing body
Grand Slam	4	See individual articles	2,000	World Tennis
ATP Finals	1	4,450,000	1,100–1,500	ATP (2009–present)
ATP Tour Masters 1000	9	2,450,000 to 3,645,000	1000	ATP
ATP Tour 500	13	755,000 to 2,100,000	500	ATP
ATP Tour 250	40	416,000 to 1,024,000	250	ATP
ATP Challenger Tour	178	35,000 to 168,000	80 to 125	ATP
Men's World Tennis Tour	534	15,000 and 25,000	10 to 20	World Tennis
Olympics	1	See individual articles	0	IOC

=== 2009 changes ===
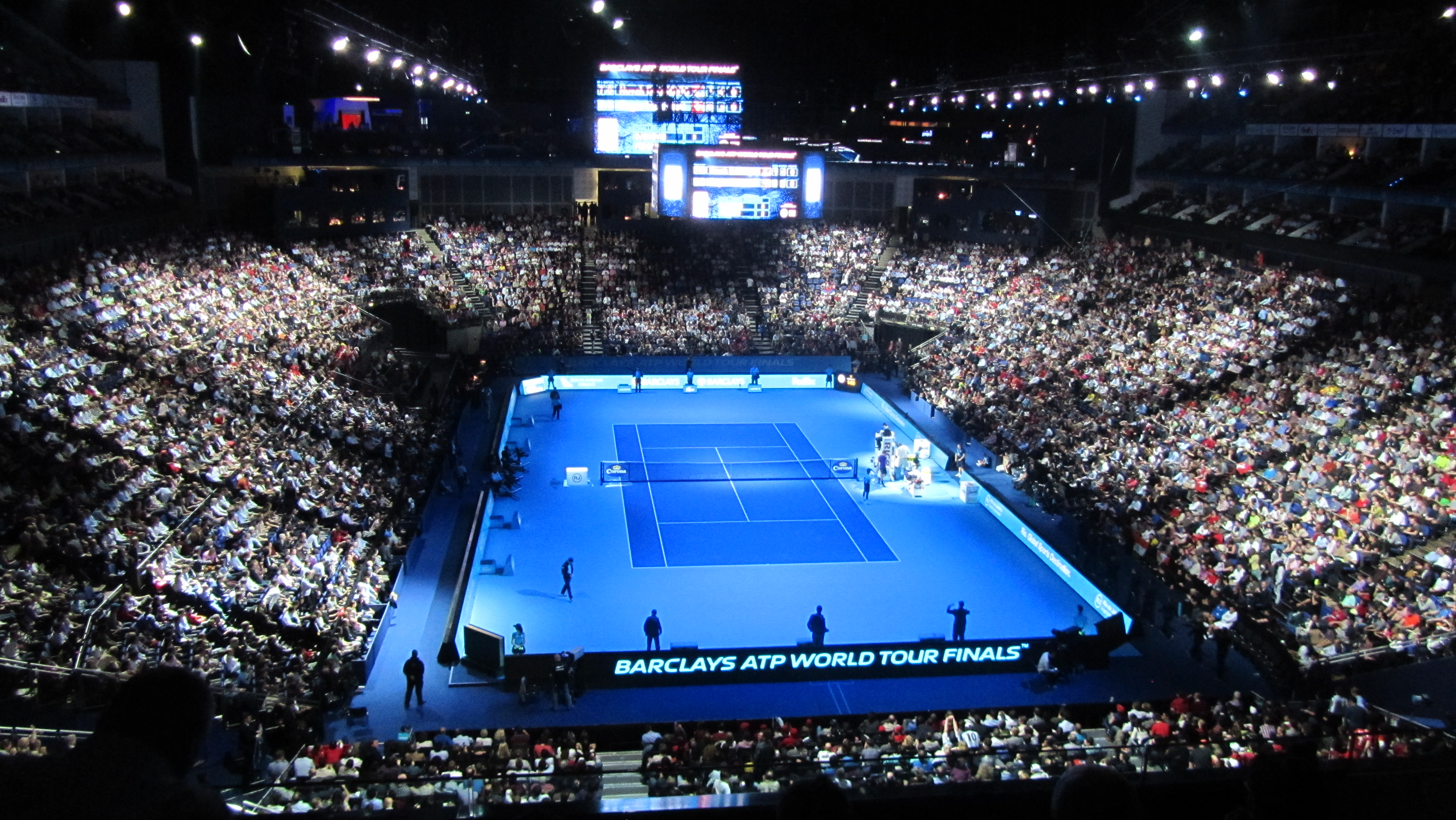
ATP World Tour Finals, 2012.

In 2009, ATP introduced a new tour structure called ATP World Tour consisting of ATP World Tour Masters 1000, ATP World Tour 500, and ATP World Tour 250 tier tournaments. Broadly speaking, the Tennis Masters Series tournaments became the new Masters 1000 level and ATP International Series Gold and ATP International Series events became ATP 500 level and 250 level events respectively.

The Masters 1000 tournaments are Indian Wells, Miami, Monte Carlo, Madrid, Rome, Toronto/Montreal, Cincinnati, Shanghai and Paris. The end-of-year event, the ATP Finals, moved from Shanghai to London. Hamburg has been displaced by the new clay court event at Madrid, which is a new combined men's and women's tournament. In 2011, Rome and Cincinnati also became combined tournaments. Severe sanctions are placed on top players skipping the Masters 1000 series events, unless medical proof is presented.

Plans to eliminate Monte Carlo and Hamburg as Masters Series events led to controversy and protests from players as well as organisers. Hamburg and Monte Carlo filed lawsuits against the ATP, and as a concession it was decided that Monte Carlo would remain a Masters 1000 level event, with more prize money and 1000 ranking points, but it would no longer be a compulsory tournament for top-ranked players. Monte Carlo later dropped its suit. Hamburg was "reserved" to become a 500 level event in the summer. Hamburg did not accept this concession, but later lost its suit.

The 500 level tournaments are Rotterdam, Dubai, Rio, Acapulco, Barcelona, Aegon Championships (Queens Club, London), Halle (Gerry Weber Open), Hamburg, Washington, Beijing, Tokyo, Basel and Vienna.

The ATP and ITF had declared that Davis Cup World Group and World Group Playoffs award a total of up to 500 points. Players accumulate points over the four rounds and the playoffs and these are counted as one of a player's four best results from the 500 level events. An additional 125 points are given to a player who wins all 8 live rubbers and wins the Davis Cup.

== ATP rankings ==
ATP publishes weekly rankings of professional players: ATP rankings (commonly known as the 'world rankings'), a 52-week rolling ranking, and the ATP Race to Turin, a year to date ranking. All ATP players also have a Universal Tennis Rating, based on head-to-head results.

The ATP rankings is used for determining qualification for entry and seeding in all tournaments for both singles and doubles. Within the ATP rankings period which is the past year, points are accumulated with the exception of those for the ATP Finals, whose points are dropped following the last ATP event of the year. The player with the most points by the season's end is the world No. 1 of the year.

The ATP rankings Race to Turin is a calendar-year indicator of what the PIF ATP Rankings will be on the Monday after the end of the regular season. Players finishing in the top eight of the Emirates ATP Rankings following the Paris Masters will qualify for the ATP Finals.

At the beginning of the 2009 season, all accumulated ranking points were doubled to bring them in line with the new tournament ranking system.

=== Current rankings ===
[ · ]

ATP rankings (singles) as of 2 November 2026
No.	Player	Points	Move
1	Alexander Zverev (GER)	9,550	▲1
2	Jannik Sinner (ITA)	9,450	▼1
3	Carlos Alcaraz (ESP)	6,100	Steady
4	Ben Shelton (USA)	4,530	Steady
5	Daniil Medvedev	3,860	Steady
6	Flavio Cobolli (ITA)	3,690	Steady
7	Arthur Fils (FRA)	3,525	▲1
8	Frances Tiafoe (USA)	3,430	▲1
9	Alex de Minaur (AUS)	3,410	▲1
10	Rafael Jódar (ESP)	3,209	▲1
11	Novak Djokovic (SRB)	3,140	▲1
12	Taylor Fritz (USA)	3,095	▲1
13	Félix Auger-Aliassime (CAN)	2,875	▼6
14	Tommy Paul (USA)	2,775	Steady
15	Jiří Lehečka (CZE)	2,580	▲6
16	Jakub Menšík (CZE)	2,545	Steady
17	Alejandro Davidovich Fokina (ESP)	2,510	▼2
18	Brandon Nakashima (USA)	2,375	▼1
19	Learner Tien (USA)	2,345	▼1
20	Francisco Cerúndolo (ARG)	2,260	▼1

[ · ]

ATP rankings (doubles) as of 2 November 2026
No.	Player	Points	Move
1	Harri Heliövaara (FIN)	9,270	Steady
=	Henry Patten (GBR)	9,270	Steady
3	Neal Skupski (GBR)	6,980	Steady
4	Christian Harrison (USA)	6,070	Steady
5	Horacio Zeballos (ARG)	5,530	Steady
6	Marcel Granollers (ESP)	5,530	Steady
7	Andrea Vavassori (ITA)	5,450	Steady
8	Marcelo Arévalo (ESA)	5,245	Steady
9	Mate Pavić (CRO)	5,245	Steady
10	Simone Bolelli (ITA)	5,150	Steady
11	Kevin Krawietz (GER)	4,850	Steady
12	Tim Pütz (GER)	4,580	Steady
13	Albano Olivetti (FRA)	3,950	▲7
14	Théo Arribagé (FRA)	3,950	▲7
15	Manuel Guinard (FRA)	3,880	▲2
16	Guido Andreozzi (ARG)	3,880	▲2
17	Rafael Matos (BRA)	3,735	▼2
18	Orlando Luz (BRA)	3,735	▼2
19	Neil Oberleitner (AUT)	3,690	▲3
20	Lucas Miedler (AUT)	3,640	▼1

== Organizational structure ==
As of 1 January 2020, Andrea Gaudenzi is the chairman of ATP and Eno Polo was appointed as the chief executive officer in September 2025.

The ATP Board of Directors includes the chairman, along with four tournament representatives and four player representatives. The player representatives are elected by the ATP Player Council. The current board members are:

- Chairman: Andrea Gaudenzi
- Player representatives
  - Pablo Andújar
  - Luben Pampoulov
  - Mark Knowles
  - Warren Green
- Tournament representatives
  - Gavin Forbes
  - Christer Hult
  - Chris Kermode
  - Herwig Straka

The twelve-member ATP Player Advisory Council delivers advisory decisions to the Board of Directors, which has the power to accept or reject the council's suggestions. As of 2026, the Council consists of four players who are ranked within the top 50 in singles (Andrey Rublev, Nuno Borges, Pedro Martinez, and Zizou Bergs), two players who are ranked between 51 and 100 in singles (Camilo Ugo Carabelli and Mackenzie McDonald), two top 50 players in doubles (Andrea Vavassori and Marcelo Arevalo), two at-large members (Jaume Munar and Zhang Zhizhen), one alumni member (Nicolás Pereira), and one coach (Federico Ricci).

The ATP Tournament Advisory Council consists of a total of nine members, of which there are three representatives each from the Europe, Americas and the International Group of tournaments.

== See also ==
- World Tennis
- ATP Challenger Tour
- ATP rankings
- List of ATP number 1 ranked singles tennis players
- List of ATP number 1 ranked doubles tennis players
- ATP Awards
- ATP Tour records
- Grand Prix Tennis Circuit
- World Championship Tennis
- ATP Champions Tour
- Grand Slam (tennis)
- Women's Tennis Association
- Tennis Integrity Unit
- International Tennis Integrity Agency
