= Men's International Professional Tennis Council =

Tennis organization

The Men's International Professional Tennis Council (MIPTC), renamed to Men's Tennis Council (MTC) in 1988, was a governing body that administered the men's professional Grand Prix tennis circuit.

It was founded in 1974 and was made up of three representatives of the International Tennis Federation (ITF) and three players representing the Association of Tennis Professionals (ATP). From 1976 onwards, three tournament directors were added representing North America, Europe and the Rest of the World respectively. Among its main responsibilities were the sanctioning and scheduling of the tournaments that comprise the Grand Prix circuit. Additionally it was responsible for creating a code of conduct for tennis players and its subsequent enforcement via the administration of fines and suspensions.

On 30 August 1988, during the first day of the US Open, the ATP, dissatisfied with their lack of influence on how the sport was managed and marketed, announced its departure from the MIPTC (then renamed to MTC) and the creation of a separate ATP Tour from 1990 onward. As a result, the MIPTC was disbanded in 1989.
