= Virginia Slims World Championship Series =

Tennis tour

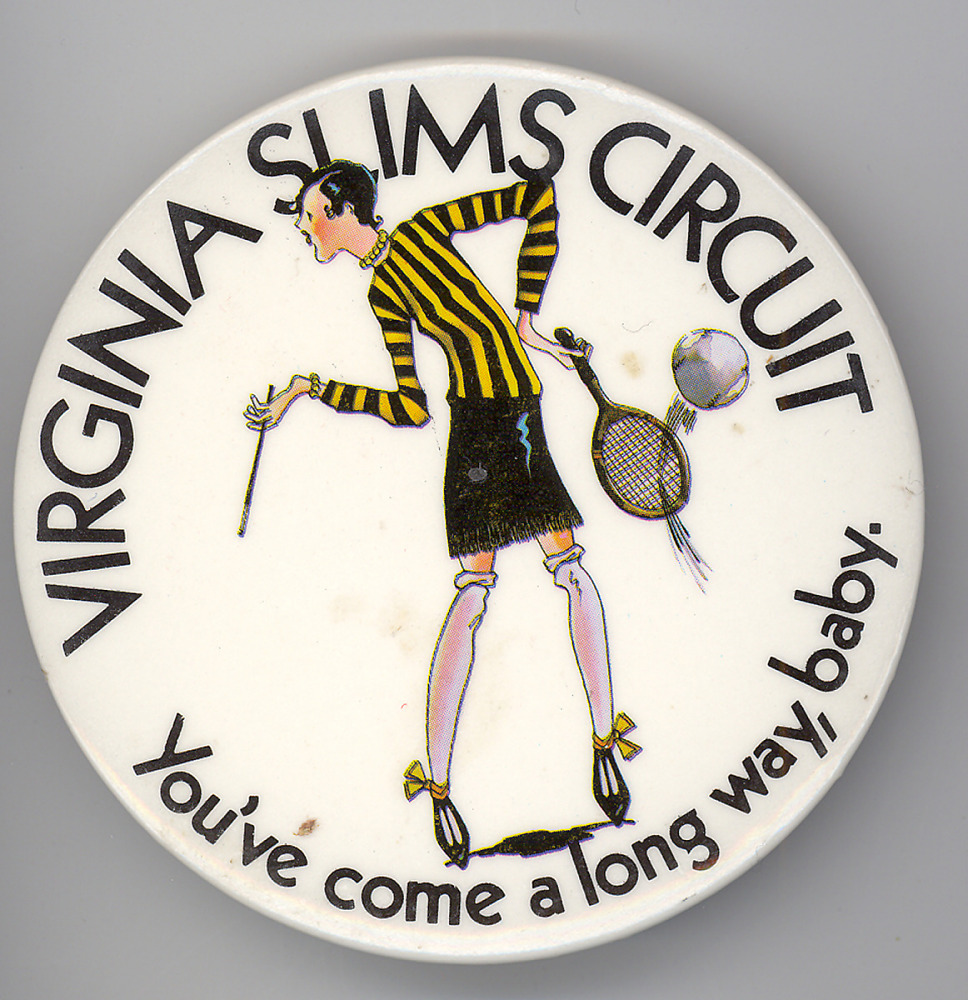

Details
- Duration: 1970–1989
- Edition: 19 (seasons)

Achievements (singles)

The Virginia Slims World Championship Series (its sponsored name) or WTA World Championship Series (its tour name) was the women's top tier tennis tour administered by the Women's Tennis Association that was first founded in 1970 as the Virginia Slims Series of events that were then part of ILTF World Circuit. It eventually became the basis for the later WTA Tour. The players, dubbed the Original 9, rebelled against the United States Lawn Tennis Association (USLTA) because of the wide inequality between the amount of prize money paid to male tennis players and to female tennis players. In 1971 it was rebranded as the Virginia Slims Circuit until 1978 and was a rival tour to the ILTF Women's International Grand Prix until 1976. In 1979 it was branded as the Avon Championship Circuit until 1981. In 1982 it was merged with the Toyota International Series as a single women's tennis tour and rebranded under its last title name until 1989. In 1990 it was succeeded by the WTA World Tour.

== Background ==
The Open era began with the British Hard Court Championships in Bournemouth in 1968. At the first Open Wimbledon, the prize-fund difference was 2.5:1 in favour of men. Billie Jean King won £750 for taking the title, while Rod Laver took £2,000. The total purses of the competitions were £14,800 for men and £5,680 for women. By the 1970s, the pay difference which had been a 2.5:1 ratio between men and women had increased. In 1969, ratios of 5:1 in terms of pay were common at smaller tournaments; by 1970, these figures increased to 8:1 and even 12:1.

The situation came to a head in 1970, when most tournaments offered four times as much prize money to men than they did to women. At the 1970 Italian Open, men's singles champion Ilie Năstase was paid US$3,500 while women's singles champion King received just US$600. On top of this, the USLTA failed to organise any tournaments for women in 1970.

== The campaign ==
King and eight other female tennis players – Americans Rosemary Casals, Nancy Richey, Peaches Bartkowicz, Kristy Pigeon, Valerie Ziegenfuss, and Julie Heldman; and Australians Kerry Melville Reid and Judy Tegart Dalton – decided to enlist World Tennis magazine publisher Gladys Heldman to help negotiate for greater equality in prize money and provide valuable public relations assistance. All the players were putting their tennis careers at risk because the influential USLTA did not back them.

Gladys Heldman and the "Original 9" decided to target the Pacific Southwest Championships held in Los Angeles on the grounds that it paid eight times more money to men than it did to women. Heldman attempted to get the tournament chairman, former professional tennis player Jack Kramer, to reduce the inequality between the prize money purses for men and women. Kramer refused, leading the "Original 9" to declare at a press conference held at Forest Hills, New York that they would boycott the Pacific Southwest Championships and play at what would become the first Virginia Slims Circuit event, a US$7,500 tournament held in Houston, Texas in September 1970. Despite the USLTA's declaration that it would not sanction this event, the "Original 9" went ahead, with Casals defeating Dalton in the final 5–7, 6–1, 7–5.

== The formation ==
Heldman, with the assistance of Joe Cullman of Philip Morris, then offered US$5,000 out of her own pocket to allow the "Original 9" to sign token $1 contracts and set up their own tour of eight professional tournaments in 1970. The tour was sponsored by Virginia Slims. This independent women's professional tennis circuit provided more equal prize money than had been provided previously by the USLTA and other organisations. Despite the USLTA's suspension of the "Original 9" from its tournaments, by the end of the year the Virginia Slims Circuit was able to boost its numbers from nine to forty members, which helped pave the way for the first full year season of the Circuit in 1971. Subsequently, in the aftermath of the creation of the Women's Tennis Association in 1973, the Virginia Slims Circuit would eventually absorb the ILTF's Women's Grand Prix circuit and become the WTA Tour.

== Circuit names ==
- Virginia Slims Series (1970) part of the ILTF World Circuit
- Virginia Slims Circuit (1971–1972) part of the ILTF World Circuit
- Virginia Slims Circuit (1973–1978) part of the WTA Tour
- Avon Championship Circuit (1979–1981) ditto
- Virginia Slims World Championship Series (1982–1989) rebranded succeeded by a single WTA Tour

== See also ==
- Colgate International Series
- Colgate Series
- History of tennis
- ILTF Women's International Grand Prix
- Toyota International Series
