= ILTF Women's International Grand Prix Circuit =

Tennis tour

Details
- Duration: 1971–1976
- Edition: 1-6

Achievements (singles)

The ILTF Women's International Grand Prix Circuit was one of the worldwide top-tier tennis tours for women founded in 1971 as the ILTF Women's Grand Prix. It was administered by International Lawn Tennis Federation (ILTF). It was formed by taking the top premier events from the earlier ILTF World Circuit, and was a rival tour to the Virginia Slims Circuit. In 1976 its last remaining ten events were absorbed into a new women's tour called the Colgate International Series circuit (eventually becoming the Toyota International Series circuit).

== Seasons ==
- 1971 ILTF Women's Grand Prix
- 1972 ILTF Women's Grand Prix
- 1973 ILTF Women's International Grand Prix
- 1974 ILTF Women's International Grand Prix
- 1975 ILTF Women's International Grand Prix
- 1976 ILTF Women's International Grand Prix Circuit

== Official names ==
- ILTF Women's Grand Prix Circuit (1971–1972)
- ILTF Women's International Grand Prix Circuit (1973–1976)

== Sponsorship names ==
- ILTF Women's Pepsi Grand Prix (1971–1972)
- ILTF Women's Commercial Union Grand Prix (1973–1976)

== Sponsors ==
- PepsiCo (1971–72)
- Commercial Union (1973–76)

== See also ==
- Virginia Slims Circuit
