= Toyota International Series =

Tennis tour

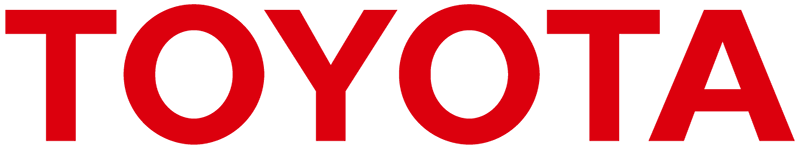

Details
- Duration: 1977–1982
- Edition: 6 (seasons)

Achievements (singles)

The Toyota International Series was a professional women's tennis circuit administered by the Women's Tennis Association that was founded in 1977 as the Colgate International Series it consisted of tournaments absorbed from the ILTF Women's International Grand Prix and included all those worldwide events that were not part of the Virginia Slims Circuit whose tournaments were mainly in the United States. In 1979 it was renamed as the Colgate Series. In 1981 Toyota took over sponsorship of the circuit from Colgate-Palmolive where it resumed under its last title name until 1982.

The circuits seasonal finales were known as the Colgate Series Championships then later the Toyota Championships.

In 1983 it was merged into a single women's top tier global tour called Virginia Slims World Championship Series.

It was administered by the Women's Tennis Association. In 1990 the VS World Championships Series became known as the WTA World Tour, today known as the WTA Tour.

== Season ending finals ==
These events were the fall season finales of the Colgate Series, then later Toyota International Series circuits. They operated in much the same way as the men's WCT Circuit which also had seasonal WCT Finals held in the fall or winter.

- Colgate International Series Championships (1977–78)
- Colgate Series Championships (1979–80)
- Toyota Championships (1981–82)

== Circuit tournaments ==
Note: Official named events are listed some by their sponsored names.

=== 1976-77 ===
- Atlanta Women's Tennis Classic
- Borniquen Tennis Classic
- Canadian Open
- Charlotte Tennis Classic
- Colgate Inaugural
- Colgate International Championships
- Dewar Cup Finals
- Family Circle Cup
- Florida Federal Open
- German Open
- Italian Open
- New South Wales Open
- South African Open
- Thunderbird Classic
- Toray Sillook Open
- Toyota Women's Classic
- U.S. Women's Clay Court Championships
- WTA Brazil Open

=== 1977-78 ===
- Atlanta Women's Tennis Classic
- Australian Open
- Bergen County Classic
- Bremar Cup
- Brighton International
- Canadian Open
- Chichester International
- Colgate International of Australia
- Eastbourne International
- Family Circle Cup
- Florida Federal Open
- French Open
- German Open
- Italian Open
- New South Wales Open
- River Plate Championships
- South African Open
- Stuttgart Open
- Thunderbird Classic
- US Open
- U.S. Women's Clay Court Championships
- U.S. Women's Indoor Championships
- Victorian Open
- Wimbledon Championships
- Women in Tennis International
- World Tennis Classic

=== 1978-79 ===
- Australian Open
- Austrian Open
- Atlanta Women's Tennis Classic
- Bancroft Trophy
- Borden Classic
- Brighton International
- Canadian Open
- Chichester International
- Christchurch International
- Eastbourne International
- Family Circle Cup
- French Open
- Florida Federal Open
- Greater Pittsburgh Open
- German Open
- Italian Open
- Japan Open
- New South Wales Open (played twice)
- Melbourne Classic
- Richmond International
- Southern California Open
- Stockholm Open
- Stuttgart Open
- Thunderbird Classic
- Toray Sillook Open
- Toyota Women's Classic
- US Open
- U.S. Clay Court Championships
- U.S. Women's Indoor Championships
- Wimbledon Championships
- WTA Sydney Open
- Victorian Open
- Volvo Tennis Cup

== Circuit names ==
- Colgate International Series (1977–1978)
- Colgate Series (1979–1980)
- Toyota International Series (1981–1982)

== Sponsors ==
The main sponsors of this circuit included;

- Colgate-Palmolive (1977–80)
- Toyota (1981–82)
