= WTA Sydney Open =

Defunct tennis tournament
- Event name: Varied
- Tour: WTA Tour
- Founded: 1976
- Abolished: 1979
- Editions: 4
- Location: Sydney, Australia
- Venue: White City Stadium
- Surface: Grass

The WTA Sydney Open, was a professional women's tennis tournament held in Sydney, Australia. The event, the first tournament in Australia exclusively for women, was played under various sponsored names as part of the WTA Tour and took place in November or the first half of December from 1976 through 1979. It was played on outdoor grass courts at the White City Stadium.

== Finals ==
=== Singles ===
Year	Sponsored Name	Winners	Runners-up	Score
1976	Colgate International Women's Championships	(United States) Martina Navratilova	(Netherlands) Betty Stöve	7–5, 6–2
1977	Colgate International of Australia	(Australia) Evonne Goolagong Cawley	(Australia) Kerry Reid	6–1, 6–3
1978	Toyota Women's Classic	(Australia) Dianne Fromholtz	(Australia) Kerry Reid	6–1, 1–6, 6–4
1979	NSW Building Society Women's Classic	(United Kingdom) Sue Barker	(South Africa) Rosalyn Fairbank	6–0, 7–5

=== Doubles ===
Year	Champions	Runners-up	Score
1976	(United States) Martina Navratilova (Netherlands) Betty Stöve	(France) Françoise Dürr (United States) Ann Kiyomura	6–3, 7–5
1977	(Australia) Evonne Goolagong Cawley / (Netherlands) Betty Stöve vs. (South Africa) Greer Stevens / (Australia) Kerry Reid		divided
1978	(Australia) Kerry Reid (Australia) Wendy Turnbull	(New Zealand) Judy Chaloner (United Kingdom) Anne Hobbs	6–2, 4–6, 6–2
1979	(United States) Billie Jean King (Australia) Wendy Turnbull	(United Kingdom) Sue Barker (United States) Pam Shriver	7–5, 6–4

== See also ==
- New South Wales Open
