= 1983 Virginia Slims of Boston – Singles =

Singles
- 1983 Virginia Slims of Boston

Final
- Champion: (Australia) Wendy Turnbull
- Runner-up: (West Germany) Sylvia Hanika
- Score: 6–4, 3–6, 6–4

Details
- Draw: 32
- Seeds: 8

Events
| Singles | Doubles |
| ← 1982 · | Virginia Slims of Boston | · 1984 → |

Kathy Jordan was the defending champion but lost in the second round to Billie Jean King.

Wendy Turnbull won in the final 6–4, 3–6, 6–4 against Sylvia Hanika.

== Seeds ==
A champion seed is indicated in bold text while text in italics indicates the round in which that seed was eliminated.

1. n/a
2. (United States) Tracy Austin (semifinals)
3. (Australia) **Wendy Turnbull (champion)**
4. (West Germany) Sylvia Hanika (final)
5. (United States) Billie Jean King (semifinals)
6. (United States) Barbara Potter (quarterfinals)
7. n/a
8. (South Africa) Rosalyn Fairbank (first round)

== Draw ==
=== Key ===
- Q = Qualifier
- WC = Wild card
- LL = Lucky loser
- Alt = Alternate
- SE = Special exempt
- PR = Protected ranking
- ITF = ITF entry
- JE = Junior exempt
- w/o = Walkover
- r = Retired
- d = Defaulted
- SR = Special ranking

First round
LL | (United States) J Klitch | 2 | 3
(United States) **K Horvath** | **6** | **6**
(United States) A Holton | 2 | 2
(Czechoslovakia) **M Skuherská** | **6** | **6**
(United States) **K Jordan** | **6** | **6**
(United Kingdom) V Wade | 3 | 4
(United States) A White | 2 | 2
5 | (United States) **B J King** | **6** | **6**
4 | (West Germany) **S Hanika** | **6** | **6**
(United States) S Mascarin | 3 | 3
(West Germany) **C Kohde-Kilsch** | **6** | 6 | **6**
(Italy) S Simmonds | 2 | **7** | 1
(United States) **W White** | **6** | 6 | **6**
(Australia) D Fromholtz | 2 | **7** | 2
(South Africa) **Y Vermaak** | **6** | 3 | **6**
LL | (United States) A-M Fernandez | 2 | **6** | 3
6 | (United States) **B Potter** | **6** | **6**
(United States) B Hallquist | 1 | 2
(United States) **B Gadusek** | 1 | **6** | **6**
(United States) M-L Piatek | **6** | 4 | 3
(United States) **G Purdy** | **6** | **7**
(France) C Vanier | 3 | 5
(United States) A Kiyomura | 1 | 1
3 | (Australia) **W Turnbull** | **6** | **6**
8 | (South Africa) R Fairbank | 3 | 2
(West Germany) **E Pfaff** | **6** | **6**
(United States) A Smith | **6** | 4 | 4
(United States) **B Nagelsen** | 1 | **6** | **6**
(United States) **L Allen** | **6** | **6**
(Brazil) C Monteiro | 3 | 4
(United Kingdom) J Durie | 5 | 3
2 | (United States) **T Austin** | **7** | **6**

Second round
(United States) **K Horvath** | **6** | **7**
(Czechoslovakia) M Skuherská | 2 | 6
(United States) K Jordan | 4 | 3
5 | (United States) **B J King** | **6** | **6**
4 | (West Germany) **S Hanika** | **6** | **6**
(West Germany) C Kohde-Kilsch | 2 | 4
(United States) **W White** | 4 | **6** | **6**
(South Africa) Y Vermaak | **6** | 4 | 4
6 | (United States) **B Potter** | **6** | **6**
(United States) B Gadusek | 3 | 4
(United States) G Purdy | 2 | 2
3 | (Australia) **W Turnbull** | **6** | **6**
(West Germany) E Pfaff | **6** | 2 | 4
(United States) **B Nagelsen** | 4 | **6** | **6**
(United States) L Allen | 4 | 2
2 | (United States) **T Austin** | **6** | **6**

Quarterfinals
(United States) K Horvath | 4 | 3
5 | (United States) **B J King** | **6** | **6**
4 | (West Germany) **S Hanika** | **6** | **7**
(United States) W White | 3 | 6
6 | (United States) B Potter | 3 | **6** | 4
3 | (Australia) **W Turnbull** | **6** | 2 | **6**
(United States) B Nagelsen | 3 | 3
2 | (United States) **T Austin** | **6** | **6**

Semifinals
5 | (United States) B J King | 5 | 2
4 | (West Germany) **S Hanika** | **7** | **6**
3 | (Australia) **W Turnbull** | **6** | 3 | **7**
2 | (United States) T Austin | 3 | **6** | 6

Final
4 | (West Germany) Sylvia Hanika | 4 | **6** | 4
3 | (Australia) **Wendy Turnbull** | **6** | 3 | **6**
