= 1978 Virginia Slims of Boston =

Tennis tournament Boston, Massachusetts, U.S.

- Date: March 13–19
- Edition: 5th
- Category: Virginia Slims circuit
- Draw: 32S / 12D
- Prize money: $100,000
- Surface: Carpet (Sporteze) / indoor
- Location: Boston, Massachusetts, U.S.
- Venue: Walter Brown Arena
- Attendance: 31,096

Champions

Singles
- (Australia) Evonne Goolagong Cawley

Doubles
- (United States) Billie Jean King (Czechoslovakia) Martina Navratilova
| ← 1976 · | Virginia Slims of Boston | · 1979 → |

The 1978 Virginia Slims of Boston was a women's tennis tournament played on indoor carpet courts at the Boston University Walter Brown Arena in Boston, Massachusetts in the United States that was part of the 1978 Virginia Slims World Championship Series. It was the fifth edition of the tournament and was held from March 13 through March 19, 1978. Third-seeded Evonne Goolagong Cawley won the singles title and earned $20,000 first-prize money. It was the only tournament of the year apart from Wimbledon to feature the top four players Evert, Goolagong, King and Navratilova.

== Finals ==
=== Singles ===
(Australia) Evonne Goolagong Cawley defeated (United States) Chris Evert 4–6, 6–1, 6–4

=== Doubles ===
(United States) Billie Jean King / (Czechoslovakia) Martina Navratilova defeated (Australia) Evonne Goolagong Cawley / (Netherlands) Betty Stöve 6–3, 6–2

== Prize money ==
| Event | W | F | 3rd | 4th | QF | Round of 16 | Round of 32 |
| Singles | $20,000 | $10,500 | $6,300 | $5,500 | $2,800 | $1,550 | $850 |
