= 1975 Virginia Slims of Boston =

- Date: March 3–8
- Edition: 3rd (Note: 67th edition of the U.S. Indoor Championships.)
- Category: Virginia Slims circuit
- Draw: 33S / 12D
- Prize money: $75,000
- Surface: Carpet (Sporteze) / indoor
- Location: Boston, Massachusetts, U.S.
- Venue: Walter Brown Arena

Champions

Singles
- (Czechoslovakia) Martina Navratilova

Doubles
- (United States) Rosie Casals / (United States) Billie Jean King
← 1973 ·	Virginia Slims of Boston	· 1976 →

The 1975 Virginia Slims of Boston, also known that year as the US Indoor Championships, was a women's tennis tournament played on indoor carpet courts at the Boston University Walter Brown Arena in Boston, Massachusetts in the United States that was part of the 1975 Virginia Slims World Championship Series. The tournament was held from March 3 through March 8, 1975. Martina Navratilova won the singles title and earned $15,000 first-prize money.

== Finals ==
=== Singles ===
(Czechoslovakia) Martina Navratilova defeated (Australia) Evonne Goolagong 6–2, 4–6, 6–3

=== Doubles ===
(United States) Rosie Casals / (United States) Billie Jean King defeated (United States) Chris Evert / (Czechoslovakia) Martina Navratilova 6–3, 6–4

== Prize money ==
Event	W	F	3rd	4th	QF	Round of 16	Round of 32
Singles	$15,000	$8,500	$4,600	$3,800	$2,100	$1,100	$550
