= 1983 Virginia Slims of Boston =

- Date: March 14 – 20
- Edition: 10th
- Category: Virginia Slims circuit
- Draw: 32S / 16D
- Prize money: $150,000
- Surface: Carpet (Sporteze) / indoor
- Location: Boston, Massachusetts, U.S.
- Venue: Walter Brown Arena

Champions

Singles
- (Australia) Wendy Turnbull

Doubles
- (United Kingdom) Jo Durie / (United States) Ann Kiyomura
← 1982 ·	Virginia Slims of Boston	· 1984 →

The 1983 Virginia Slims of Boston was a women's tennis tournament played onindoor carpet courts at the Walter Brown Arena in Boston, Massachusetts in the United States that was part of the 1983 Virginia Slims World Championship Series. The tournament was held from March 14 through March 20, 1983. Wendy Turnbull won the singles title and earned $30,000 first-prize money as well as 200 Virginia Slims Series points.

== Finals ==
=== Singles ===
(Australia) Wendy Turnbull defeated (West Germany) Sylvia Hanika 6–4, 3–6, 6–4

- It was Turnbull's 1st singles title of the year and the 10th of her career.

=== Doubles ===
(United Kingdom) Jo Durie / (United States) Ann Kiyomura defeated (United States) Kathy Jordan / (United States) Anne Smith 6–3, 6–1

- It was Durie's 1st title of the year and the 2nd of her career. It was Kiyomura's 2nd title of the year and the 15th of her career.
