= 1983 Virginia Slims of Boston – Doubles =

Doubles
- 1983 Virginia Slims of Boston
- 1982 Champions: (United States) Kathy Jordan (United States) Anne Smith

Final
- Champions: (United Kingdom) Jo Durie (United States) Ann Kiyomura
- Runners-up: (United States) Kathy Jordan (United States) Anne Smith
- Score: 6–3, 6–1

Events
Singles	Doubles
- Virginia Slims of Boston

Kathy Jordan and Anne Smith were the defending champions but lost in the final 6–3, 6–1 against Jo Durie and Ann Kiyomura.

== Seeds ==
Champion seeds are indicated in bold text, while text in italics indicates the round in which those seeds were eliminated.

1. (United States) Kathy Jordan / (United States) Anne Smith (final)
2. (West Germany) Claudia Kohde-Kilsch / (West Germany) Eva Pfaff (semifinals)
3. (United States) Rosemary Casals / (Romania) Virginia Ruzici (semifinals)
4. (United States) Kathleen Horvath / (South Africa) Yvonne Vermaak (first round)

== Draw ==
Key

- Q = Qualifier
- WC = Wild card
- LL = Lucky loser
- Alt = Alternate
- ITF = ITF entry
- PR = Protected ranking
- SR = Special ranking
- SE = Special exempt
- JE = Junior exempt
- JR = Junior Accelerator Programme entrant
- CO = College Accelerator Programme entrant
- NG = Next Gen Accelerator Program entrant
- w/o = Walkover
- r = Retired
- d = Defaulted

First round
1	(United States) **K Jordan** (United States) **A Smith**	**6**	**6**
(South Africa) I Kloss (Australia) P Whytcross	1	0
(United States) B Nagelsen (United Kingdom) V Wade	3	2
(South Africa) **R Fairbank** (Australia) **D Fromholtz**	**6**	**6**
3	(United States) **R Casals** (Romania) **V Ruzici**	**7**	**6**
(United States) S Mascarin (Australia) E Sayers	5	4
(United States) L Antonoplis (United States) K Jones-Shaefer	**7**	1	r
(Brazil) **P Medrado** (Brazil) **C Monteiro**	6	**3**
(United Kingdom) **J Durie** (United States) **A Kiyomura**	**6**	**6**
(Socialist Federal Republic of Yugoslavia) M Jaušovec (United States) M-L Piatek	2	2
(United Kingdom) **A Hobbs** (Australia) **S Leo**	4	**6**	**6**
4	(United States) K Horvath (South Africa) Y Vermaak	**6**	2	1
(United States) A-M Fernandez (United States) B Hallquist	3	1
(United States) **B Gadusek** (United States) **W White**	**6**	**6**
(United States) L Allen (United States) S Walsh	6	2
2	(West Germany) **C Kohde-Kilsch** (West Germany) **E Pfaff**	**7**	**6**

Quarterfinals
1	(United States) **K Jordan** (United States) **A Smith**	**7**	**7**
(South Africa) R Fairbank (Australia) D Fromholtz	5	5
3	(United States) **R Casals** (Romania) **V Ruzici**	**6**	**6**
(Brazil) P Medrado (Brazil) C Monteiro	2	2
(United Kingdom) **J Durie** (United States) **A Kiyomura**	**6**	6	**6**
(United Kingdom) A Hobbs (Australia) S Leo	3	**7**	3
(United States) B Gadusek (United States) W White	4	2
2	(West Germany) **C Kohde-Kilsch** (West Germany) **E Pfaff**	**6**	**6**

Semifinals
1	(United States) **K Jordan** (United States) **A Smith**	5	**6**	**6**
3	(United States) R Casals (Romania) V Ruzici	**7**	3	2
(United Kingdom) **J Durie** (United States) **A Kiyomura**	**6**	**7**
2	(West Germany) C Kohde-Kilsch (West Germany) E Pfaff	1	6

Final
1	(United States) Kathy Jordan (United States) Anne Smith	3	1
(United Kingdom) **Jo Durie** (United States) **Ann Kiyomura**	**6**	**6**
