= 1980 Avon Championships of Boston =

- Date: March 10–16
- Edition: 7th
- Category: Virginia Slims circuit
- Draw: 32S / 16D
- Prize money: $125,000
- Surface: Carpet (Sporteze) / indoor
- Location: Boston, Massachusetts, U.S.
- Venue: Walter Brown Arena; Boston Garden

Champions

Singles
- (United States) Tracy Austin

Doubles
- (United States) Rosie Casals / (Australia) Wendy Turnbull
← 1979 ·	Virginia Slims of Boston	· 1981 →

The 1980 Avon Championships of Boston was a women's tennis tournament played on indoor carpet courts at the Boston University Walter Brown Arena (Note: The finals on Sunday were played at the Boston Garden.) in Boston, Massachusetts in the United States that was part of the 1980 Avon Championships circuit. It was the seventh edition of the tournament and was held from Monday, March 10 through Sunday March 16, 1980. First-seeded Tracy Austin won the singles title and earned $24,000 first-prize money.

== Finals ==
=== Singles ===
(United States) Tracy Austin defeated (United Kingdom) Virginia Wade 6–2, 6–1

- It was Austin's 3rd title of the year and the 13th of her career.

=== Doubles ===
(United States) Rosie Casals / (Australia) Wendy Turnbull defeated (United States) Billie Jean King / (South Africa) Ilana Kloss 6–4, 7–6^{(7–4)}

== Prize money ==
Event	W	F	SF	QF	Round of 16	Round of 32	Prel. round
Singles	$24,000	$14,000	$6,350	$3,000	$1,600	$900	$600
