= 1973 Virginia Slims of Boston =

- Date: April 11–15
- Edition: 2nd
- Category: Virginia Slims circuit
- Draw: 32S / ?D
- Prize money: $25,000
- Surface: Carpet (Sporteze) / indoor
- Location: Boston, Massachusetts, U.S.
- Venue: Boston Harbor Marina

Champions

Singles
- (Australia) Margaret Court

Doubles
- (United States) Rosie Casals / (United States) Billie Jean King
← 1971 ·	Virginia Slims of Boston	· 1975 →

The 1973 Virginia Slims of Boston, also known as the Virginia Slims Indoors, was a women's tennis tournament played on indoor carpet courts in Boston, Massachusetts in the United States that was part of the 1973 Virginia Slims World Championship Series. The tournament was held from April 11 through April 15, 1973. Margaret Court won the singles title after a 59-minute final against Billie Jean King and earned $6,000 first-prize money.

== Finals ==
=== Singles ===
(Australia) Margaret Court defeated (United States) Billie Jean King 6–2, 6–4

=== Doubles ===
(United States) Rosie Casals / (United States) Billie Jean King defeated (France) Françoise Dürr / (Netherlands) Betty Stöve 6–4, 6–2
