= Lynn Gilbert =

Photographer and author

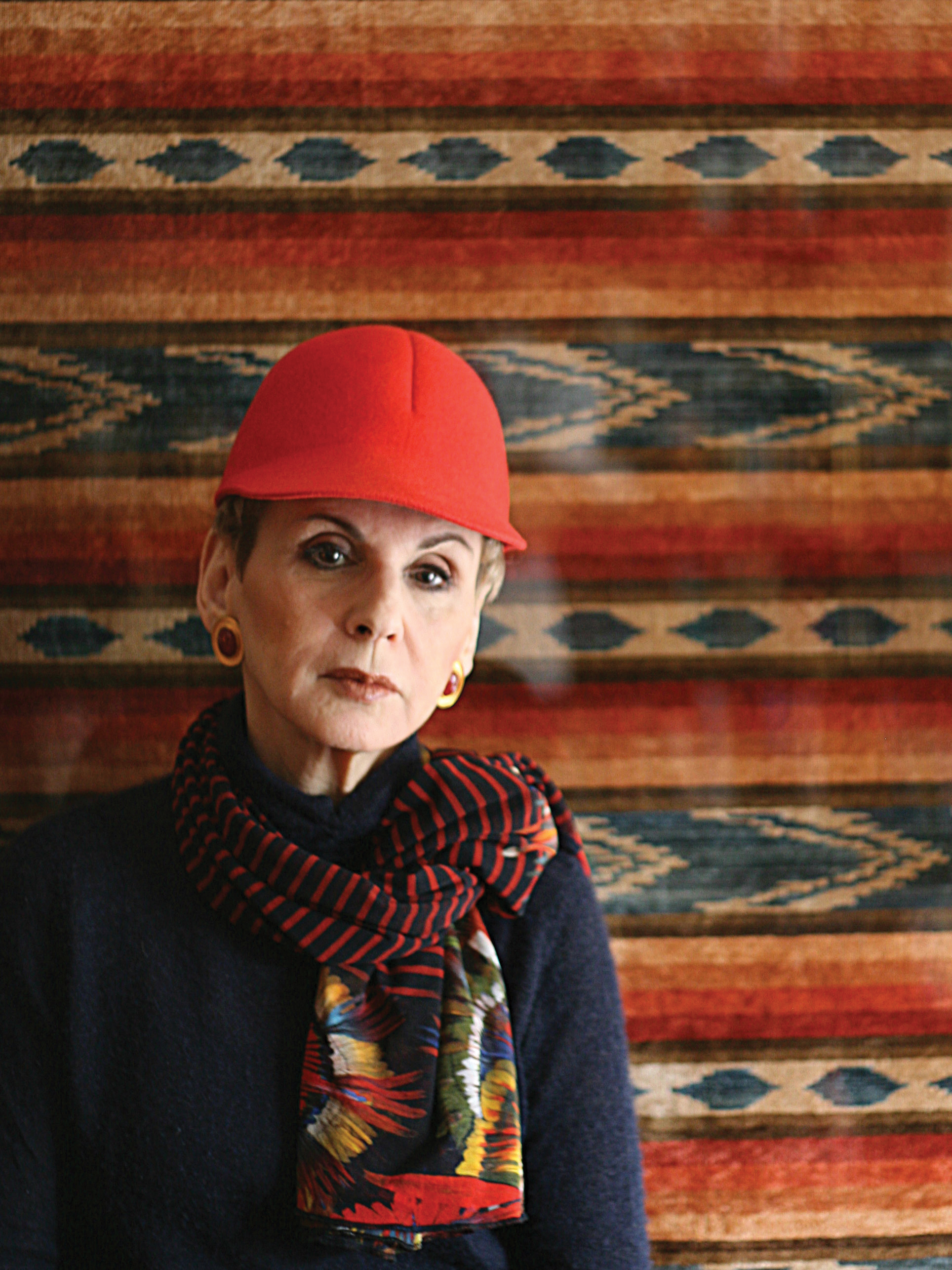
Self-portrait, 2010

Lynn Gilbert (born January 7, 1938) is an American photographer and author known for her portraits of well-known women from the 1920s to the 1980s and her documentation of Turkish homes and interiors.

== Life and career ==
Gilbert grew up in New York and earned a Bachelor of Arts in Art History from Sarah Lawrence College in Bronxville, New York in 1959. She later received a Bachelor of Science in Fashion Design from the Fashion Institute of Technology in New York City in 1962.

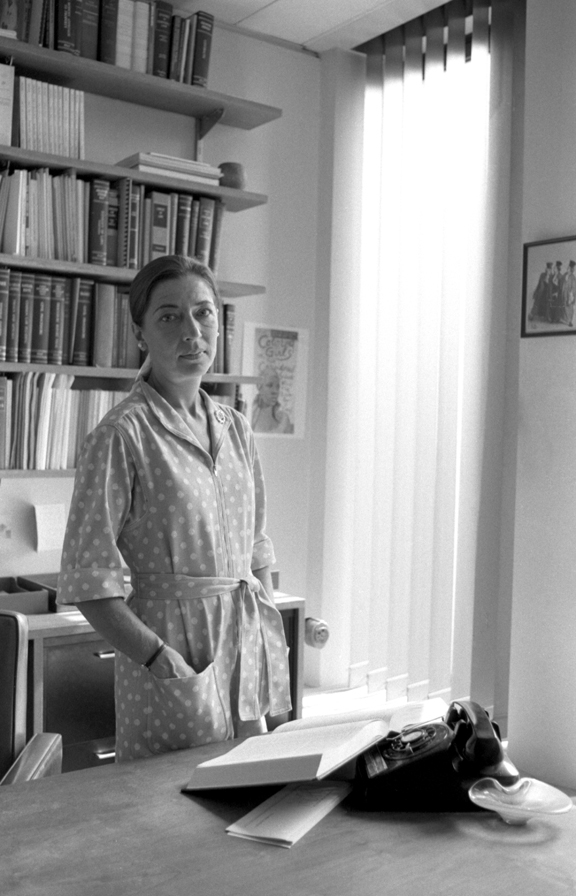
Ruth Bader Ginsburg, a gender discrimination lawyer when Gilbert shot her in 1977, would later become a Supreme Court Justice.

Gilbert began her career as a photographer documenting the lives of her children in the 1960s, and used portraits of others’ children to comment on socio-economic diversity. In 1976 the Pace Gallery commissioned Gilbert to photograph the sculptor Louise Nevelson who became the inspiration for her photographic series "Illustrious Women". Gilbert documented the stories they shared during the photo sessions to become her first book Particular Passions: Talks with Women Who Shaped Our Times, published in 1981. The book recounts the oral histories of forty-six pioneering women of the twentieth century from the arts and sciences, athletics and law, mathematics, and politics, including Betty Friedan, Gloria Steinem, Ruth Bader Ginsburg, Julia Child, Billie Jean King, Grace Murray Hopper, Joan Ganz Cooney, and Diana Vreeland. Karly Domb Sedof writing on the book and its attendant portraits in the Washington Post relates [that] "When “Particular Passions” was published in 1981, it was revolutionary" and then as Gilbert herself states to Sedof '"In the late 70s, the Internet did not exist. Information on groups of women was nonexistent. Ladies’ Home Journal/ published the first comprehensive list of 75 distinguished women in 1972, which included women like [President Richard] Nixon’s secretary, Rosemary Woods, and Rose Kennedy, whose positions were predicated on their relationship with men.”

Extensive travel to Turkey and Uzbekistan produced a photographic record of the historic home of the area, exhibited widely in Turkey, and recorded in the book, The Silk Road: Then and Now (2) published 2015. The book records traditional homes of Turkey located along the ancient Silk Road, homes both humble and affluent, with a mix of furniture, art, linens, household serving items and vibrantly colored, centuries-old handwoven rugs. Her images are governed by design, color, balance and light. Then as Jack Morgan wrote for Texas Public Radio when the photographs were displayed in the Lone Star State ... "The pictures displayed at the Roosevelt Library almost look like paintings. Light, fabric, furniture—a very different kind of beauty. And something’s missing: no electric devices".

In 2018 her work was the subject of a special exhibition "Women: A Time Capsule of the American Feminist Movement” at Thockmorton Fine Art at "The Photography Show" in New York City. In February 2024 Gilbert's photographs were the subject of a solo exhibition titled Time Capsule at the Ilon Art Gallery in Harlem.

Gilbert's work is held in the permanent collection of the National Portrait Gallery a constituent institution of the Smithsonian Institution in Washington DC, the New York Historical Society in New York City, the Smart Museum of Art at the University of Chicago, and the Richard and Ellen Sandor family collection, among numerous other institutions and private collections.

In 2022 Gilbert's portrait of Louise Nevelson received prominence anew when it appeared on posters all around the city of Venice during the Venice Biennale and as Sarah Douglas wrote in ARTnews ..."Gilbert’s image of Nevelson has become something of a symbol for this year’s Biennale".

== Exhibitions ==
- Children in Repose is Gilbert's photographic series of children from more than 100 families of varying socio-economic backgrounds in New York City in the mid 1970s.
- Lynn Gilbert's photographs of Turkey have been widely exhibited in Turkey and at the Godwin-Ternbach Museum in Queens. Her portraits are part of the permanent collection of The National Portrait Gallery, Washington DC.
- Gilbert is a contributing writer to the Turkish magazine, Cornucopia.
