= 1979 Avon Championships of Boston =

Women's tennis

- Date: March 12–18
- Edition: 6th
- Category: Virginia Slims circuit
- Draw: 32S / 16D
- Prize money: $150,000
- Surface: Carpet (Sporteze) / indoor
- Location: Boston, Massachusetts, U.S.
- Venue: Walter Brown Arena
- Attendance: 27,866

Champions

Singles
- (Australia) Dianne Fromholtz

Doubles
- (Australia) Kerry Reid / (Australia) Wendy Turnbull
| ← 1978 · | Virginia Slims of Boston | · 1980 → |

The 1979 Avon Championships of Boston was a women's tennis tournament played on indoor carpet courts at the Boston University Walter Brown Arena in Boston, Massachusetts in the United States that was part of the 1979 Avon Championships circuit. It was the sixth edition of the tournament and was held from March 12 through March 18, 1979. Second-seeded Dianne Fromholtz won the singles title and earned $30,000 first-prize money.

== Finals ==
=== Singles ===
(Australia) Dianne Fromholtz defeated (United Kingdom) Sue Barker 6–2, 7–6^{(7–4)}

=== Doubles ===
(Australia) Kerry Reid / (Australia) Wendy Turnbull defeated (United Kingdom) Sue Barker / (United States) Ann Kiyomura 6–4, 6–2

== Prize money ==
| Event | W | F | 3rd | 4th | QF | Round of 16 | Round of 32 |
| Singles | $30,000 | $15,000 | $7,500 | $7,200 | $3,500 | $1,750 | $1,000 |
