= 1981 Avon Championships of Boston =

- Date: March 16–22
- Edition: 8th
- Category: Virginia Slims circuit
- Draw: 33S / 16D
- Prize money: $150,000
- Surface: Carpet (Sporteze) / indoor
- Location: Boston, Massachusetts, U.S.
- Venue: Walter Brown Arena; Boston Garden

Champions

Singles
- (United States) Chris Evert-Lloyd

Doubles
- (United States) Barbara Potter / (United States) Sharon Walsh
← 1980 ·	Virginia Slims of Boston	· 1982 →

The 1981 Avon Championships of Boston was a women's tennis tournament played on indoor carpet courts at the Boston University Walter Brown Arena (Note: The finals on Sunday were played at the Boston Garden.) in Boston, Massachusetts in the United States that was part of the 1981 Avon Championships circuit. It was the eighth edition of the tournament and was held from March 16 through March 22, 1981. First-seeded Chris Evert-Lloyd won the singles title and earned $30,000 first-prize money.

== Finals ==
=== Singles ===
(United States) Chris Evert-Lloyd defeated (Socialist Federal Republic of Yugoslavia) Mima Jaušovec 6–4, 6–4

- It was Evert-Lloyd's 1st singles title of the year and the 102nd of her career.

=== Doubles ===
(United States) Barbara Potter / (United States) Sharon Walsh defeated (United States) JoAnne Russell / (Romania) Virginia Ruzici 5–7, 6–4, 6–3

== Prize money ==
Event	W	F	SF	QF	Round of 16	Round of 32	Prel. round
Singles	$30,000	$15,000	$7,350	$3,600	$1,900	$1,100	$700
