= 1976 Virginia Slims of Boston =

- Date: March 22–28
- Edition: 4th
- Category: Virginia Slims circuit
- Draw: 32S / 12D
- Prize money: $75,000
- Surface: Carpet (Sporteze) / indoor
- Location: Boston, Massachusetts, U.S.
- Venue: Walter Brown Arena

Champions

Singles
- (Australia) Evonne Goolagong Cawley

Doubles
- (United States) Mona Schallau / (United States) Ann Kiyomura
← 1975 ·	Virginia Slims of Boston	· 1978 →

The 1976 Virginia Slims of Boston was a women's tennis tournament played on indoor carpet courts at the Boston University Walter Brown Arena in Boston, Massachusetts in the United States that was part of the 1976 Virginia Slims World Championship Series. It was the fourth edition of the tournament and was held from March 22 through March 28, 1976. Evonne Goolagong Cawley won the singles title and earned $15,000 first-prize money.

== Finals ==
=== Singles ===
(Australia) Evonne Goolagong Cawley defeated (United Kingdom) Virginia Wade 6–2, 6–0

=== Doubles ===
(United States) Mona Schallau / (United States) Ann Kiyomura defeated (United States) Rosemary Casals / (France) Françoise Dürr 3–6, 6–1, 7–5
