= Billie Jean King Leadership Initiative =

- Founded: 19 November 2014; 11 years ago
- Founder: Billie Jean King
- Website: bjkli.org

The Billie Jean King Leadership Initiative (BJKLI) is a leadership and diversity nonprofit organization, founded by Billie Jean King in 2014. The BJKLI was created to promote diversity and inclusion in the workplace.
