= 1982 Avon Championships of Boston =

- Date: March 15–21
- Edition: 9th
- Category: Virginia Slims circuit
- Draw: 33S / 16D
- Prize money: $150,000
- Surface: Carpet (Sporteze) / indoor
- Location: Boston, Massachusetts, U.S.
- Venue: Walter Brown Arena

Champions

Singles
- (United States) Kathy Jordan

Doubles
- (United States) Kathy Jordan / (United States) Anne Smith
← 1981 ·	Virginia Slims of Boston	· 1983 →

The 1982 Avon Championships of Boston was a women's tennis tournament played on indoor carpet courts at the Boston University Walter Brown Arena in Boston, Massachusetts in the United States that was part of the 1982 Avon Championships circuit. It was the ninth edition of the tournament and was held from March 15 through March 21, 1982. Unseeded Kathy Jordan won the singles title and earned $30,000 first-prize money.

== Finals ==
=== Singles ===
(United States) Kathy Jordan defeated (Australia) Wendy Turnbull 7–5, 1–6, 6–4

- It was Jordan's 1st singles title of the year and the 3rd of her career.

=== Doubles ===
(United States) Kathy Jordan / (United States) Anne Smith defeated (United States) Rosemary Casals / (Australia) Wendy Turnbull 7–6^{(9–7)}, 2–6, 6–4

== Prize money ==
Event	W	F	SF	QF	Round of 16	Round of 32
Singles	$30,000	$15,000	$7,350	$3,600	$1,900	$1,100
