= Virginia Slims of Boston =

Defunct tennis tournament
- Event name: Virginia Slims National Indoors (1971); Virginia Slims of Boston (1972–78, 1983–84); Avon Championships of Boston (1979–82)
- Tour: WTA Tour (1973–90)
- Founded: 1971
- Abolished: 1984
- Editions: 11
- Location: Boston, Massachusetts, U.S.
- Surface: Hard (1971–80); Carpet (1981–84)

The Virginia Slims of Boston was a WTA Tour affiliated women's tennis tournament played from 1971 to 1984. It was held in Boston, Massachusetts in the United States and played on indoor hard courts from 1971 to 1980 and on indoor carpet courts from 1981 to 1984.

== Results ==
=== Singles ===
Year	Champions	Runners-up	Score
1971	(United States) Billie Jean King	(United States) Rosemary Casals	4–6, 6–2, 6–3
1972	Not held		
1973	(Australia) Margaret Court	(United States) Billie Jean King	6–2, 6–4
1974	Not held		
1975	(Czechoslovakia) Martina Navratilova	(Australia) Evonne Goolagong	6–2, 4–6, 6–3
1976	(Australia) Evonne Goolagong Cawley	(United Kingdom) Virginia Wade	6–2, 6–0
1977	Not held		
1978	(Australia) Evonne Goolagong Cawley	(United States) Chris Evert	4–6, 6–1, 6–4
1979	(Australia) Dianne Fromholtz	(United Kingdom) Sue Barker	6–2, 7–6
1980	(United States) Tracy Austin	(United Kingdom) Virginia Wade	6–2, 6–1
1981	(United States) Chris Evert-Lloyd	(Socialist Federal Republic of Yugoslavia) Mima Jaušovec	6–4, 6–4
1982	(United States) Kathy Jordan	(Australia) Wendy Turnbull	7–5, 1–6, 6–4
1983	(Australia) Wendy Turnbull	(West Germany) Sylvia Hanika	6–4, 3–6, 6–4
1984	(Czechoslovakia) Hana Mandlíková	(Czechoslovakia) Helena Suková	7–5, 6–0

=== Doubles ===
Year	Champions	Runners-up	Score
1971	(United States) Rosemary Casals (United States) Billie Jean King	(France) Françoise Dürr (United Kingdom) Ann Haydon-Jones	6–4, 7–5
1972	Not held		
1973	(United States) Rosemary Casals (United States) Billie Jean King	(France) Françoise Dürr (Netherlands) Betty Stöve	6–4, 6–2
1974	Not held		
1975	(United States) Rosemary Casals (United States) Billie Jean King	(United States) Chris Evert (Czechoslovakia) Martina Navratilova	6–3, 6–4
1976	(United States) Mona Schallau (United States) Ann Kiyomura	(United States) Rosemary Casals (France) Françoise Dürr	3–6, 6–1, 7–5
1977	Not held		
1978	(United States) Billie Jean King (Czechoslovakia) Martina Navratilova	(Australia) Evonne Goolagong Cawley (Netherlands) Betty Stöve	6–3, 6–2
1979	(Australia) Kerry Reid (Australia) Wendy Turnbull	(United Kingdom) Sue Barker (United States) Ann Kiyomura	6–4, 6–2
1980	(United States) Rosemary Casals (Australia) Wendy Turnbull	(United States) Billie Jean King (South Africa) Ilana Kloss	6–4, 7–6
1981	(United States) Barbara Potter (United States) Sharon Walsh	(United States) JoAnne Russell (Romania) Virginia Ruzici	5–7, 6–4, 6–3
1982	(United States) Kathy Jordan (United States) Anne Smith	(United States) Rosemary Casals (Australia) Wendy Turnbull	7–6, 2–6, 6–4
1983	(United Kingdom) Jo Durie (United States) Ann Kiyomura	(United States) Kathy Jordan (United States) Anne Smith	6–3, 6–1
1984	(United States) Barbara Potter (United States) Sharon Walsh	(United States) Andrea Leand (United States) Mary Lou Piatek	7–6, 6–0
