= 1984 Virginia Slims of Boston =

- Date: March 26 – April 1
- Edition: 11th
- Draw: 32S / 16D
- Prize money: $150,000
- Surface: Carpet / indoor
- Location: Boston, Massachusetts, U.S.
- Venue: Walter Brown Arena

Champions

Singles
- (Czechoslovakia) Hana Mandlíková

Doubles
- (United States) Barbara Potter / (United States) Sharon Walsh
- Virginia Slims of Boston

The 1984 Virginia Slims of Boston was a women's tennis tournament played on indoor carpet courts at the Walter Brown Arena in Boston, Massachusetts in the United States that was part of the 1984 Virginia Slims World Championship Series. The tournament was held from March 26 through April 1, 1984. Fourth-seeded Hana Mandlíková won the singles title.

== Finals ==
=== Singles ===
(Czechoslovakia) Hana Mandlíková defeated (Czechoslovakia) Helena Suková 7–5, 6–0

- It was Mandlíková's 5th singles title of the year and the 21st of her career.

=== Doubles ===
(United States) Barbara Potter / (United States) Sharon Walsh defeated (United States) Andrea Leand / (United States) Mary-Lou Daniels 7–6, 6–0

- It was Potter's 2nd title of the year and the 17th of her career. It was Walsh's 3rd title of the year and the 27th of her career.
