= List of British films of 2017 =

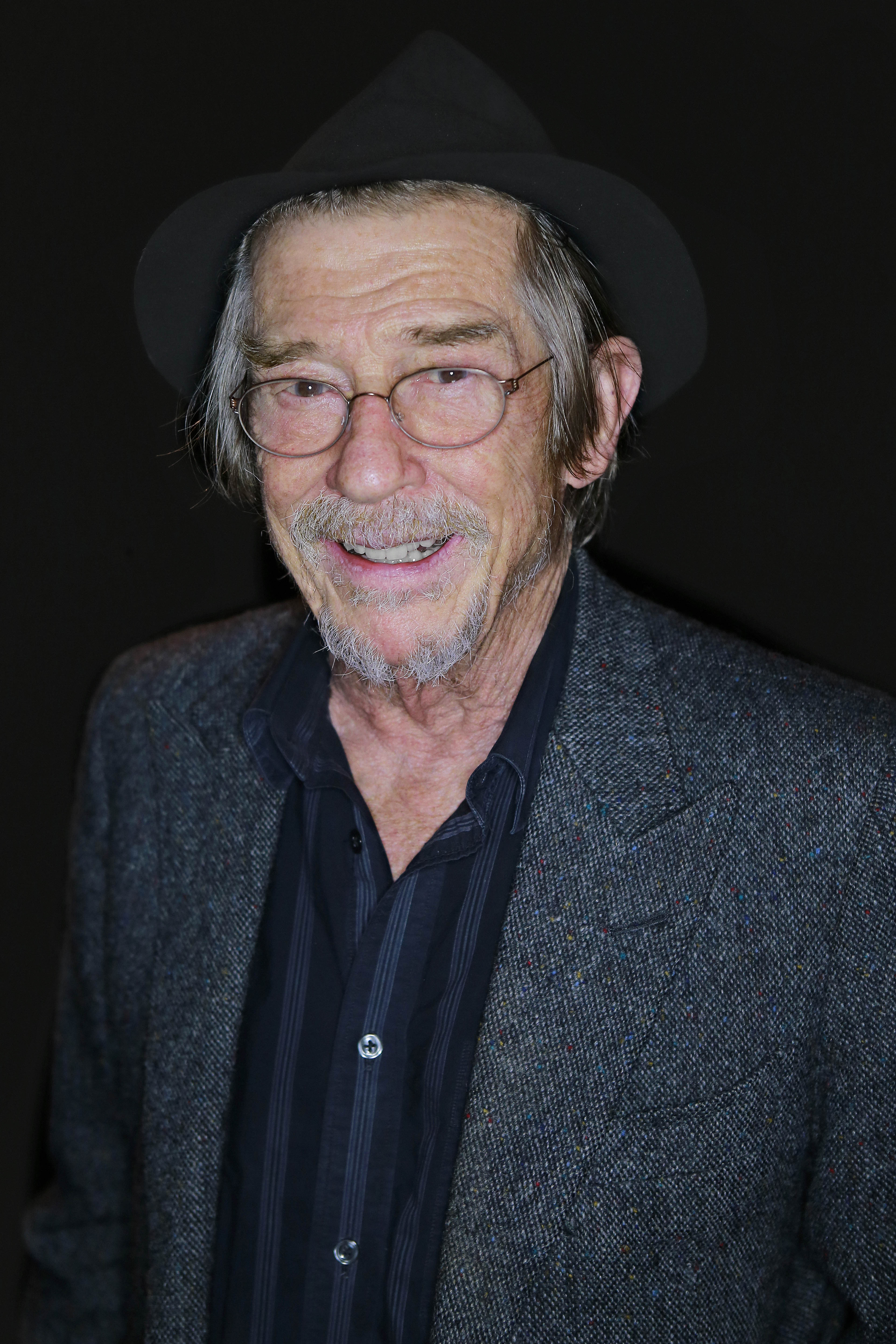
Sir John Hurt died in 2017.

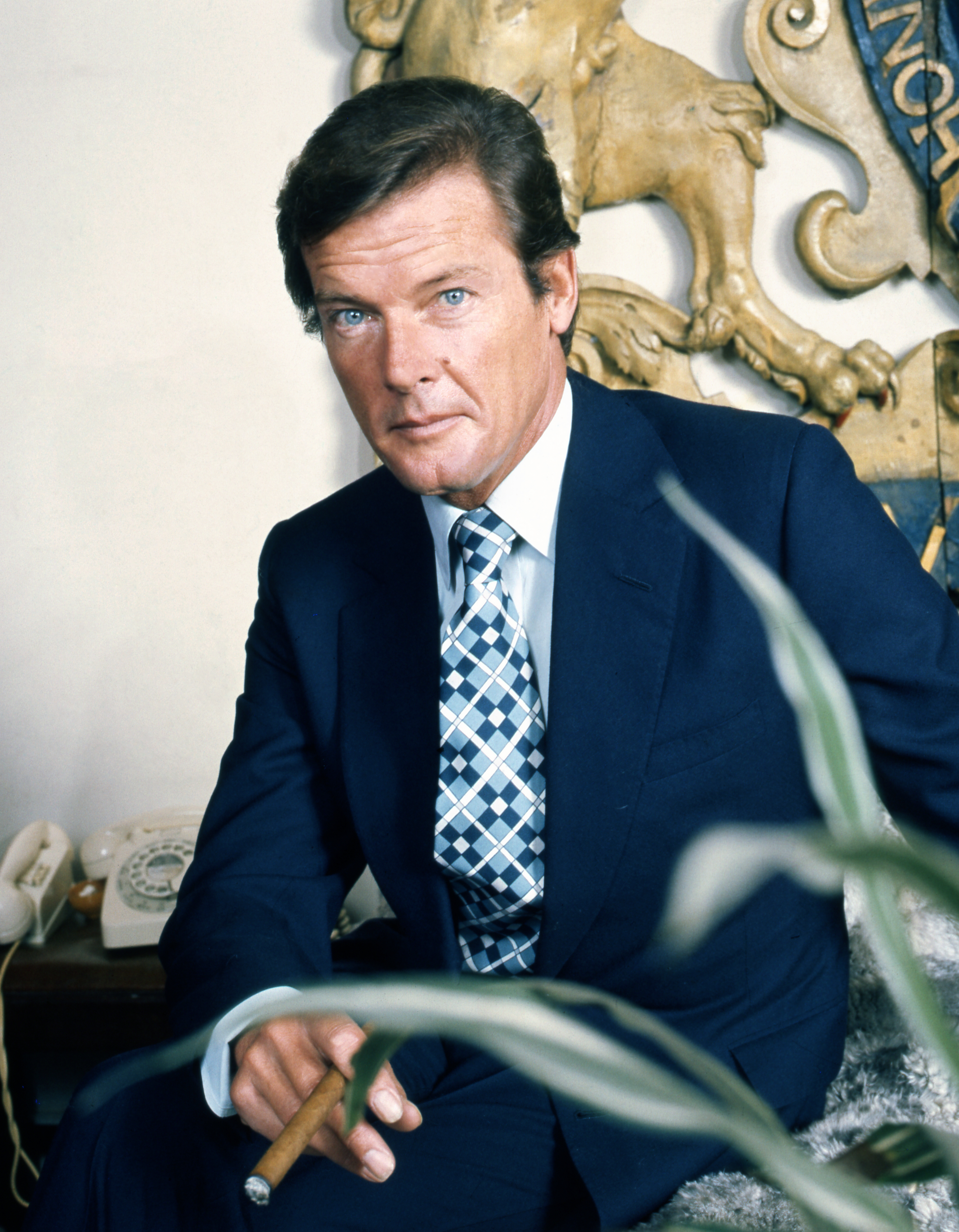
Sir Roger Moore also died in 2017.

This article lists feature-length British films and full-length documentaries that have their premieres in 2017 and were at least partly made by Great Britain or the United Kingdom. It does not feature short films, medium-length films, made-for-TV films, pornographic films, filmed theater, VR films and interactive films. It does not include films screened in previous years that had official release dates in 2017.

Also included is an overview of the major events in British film, including awards ceremonies, as well as a list of notable British film artists who died in 2017.

== Film premieres ==
=== January – March ===
Opening		Title	Cast and crew	Details	Genre(s)	Ref.
J A N U A R Y	1	Sleep Has Her House	Director: Scott Barley	Tao Films	Experimental	
J A N U A R Y	2	The Sense of an Ending	Director: Ritesh Batra; Cast: Jim Broadbent, Charlotte Rampling, Billy Howle, Freya Mavor, Harriet Walter, Emily Mortimer, Michelle Dockery	StudioCanal; Based on The Sense of an Ending by Julian Barnes (co-produced by United States)	Mystery drama	
J A N U A R Y	14	The Hippopotamus	Director: John Jencks; Cast: Roger Allam, Rod Glenn, Andrew Alexander, Russell Tovey, Paul Bown, Emily Berrington	Lightyear Entertainment; Based on The Hippopotamus by Stephen Fry	Comedy	
J A N U A R Y	20	The Discovery	Director: Charlie McDowell; Cast: Jason Segel, Rooney Mara, Jesse Plemons, Riley Keough, Robert Redford	Netflix (co-produced by United States)	Science-fiction romance	
J A N U A R Y	21	Wind River	Director: Taylor Sheridan; Cast: Jeremy Renner, Elizabeth Olsen, Graham Greene, Kelsey Asbille, Gil Birmingham	STX International; Sony Pictures Home Entertainment (co-produced by France and United States)	Neo-Western murder mystery	
J A N U A R Y	22	T2 Trainspotting	Director: Danny Boyle; Cast: Ewan McGregor, Ewen Bremner, Jonny Lee Miller, Robert Carlyle	TriStar Pictures; Loosely based on Porno by Irvine Welsh; Sequel to Trainspotting	Crime comedy drama	
J A N U A R Y	23	God's Own Country	Director: Francis Lee; Cast: Josh O'Connor, Alec Secareanu, Ian Hart, Gemma Jones	Picturehouse Entertainment	Drama	
J A N U A R Y	27	iBoy	Director: Adam Randall; Cast: Bill Milner, Maisie Williams, Miranda Richardson, Rory Kinnear	Netflix; Based on iBoy by Kevin Brooks	Science-fiction teen thriller	
J A N U A R Y	29	Daphne	Director: Peter Mackie Burns; Cast: Emily Beecham, Geraldine James, Nathaniel Martello-White, Osy Ikhile, Sinead Matthews, Stuart McQuarrie	Altitude Film Entertainment	Drama	
J A N U A R Y	29	Mansfield 66/67	Director: P. David Ebersole, Todd Hughes	Peccadillo Pictures (co-produced by United States)	Documentary	
F E B R U A R Y	4	Night Kaleidoscope	Director: Grant McPhee; Cast: Patrick O'Brien, Mariel McAllan, Kitty Colquhoun, Jason Harvey, Craig-James Moncur, Robert Williamson, Gareth Morrison, Ashley Sutherland	Tartan Features	Psychedelic vampire horror	
F E B R U A R Y	11	Butterfly Kisses	Director: Rafael Kapelinski; Cast: Theo Stevenson, Thomas Turgoose, Elliot Cowan, Rosie Day, Charlotte Beaumont, Honor Kneafsey	Flix Premiere (co-produced by Poland)	Drama	
F E B R U A R Y	11	Erase and Forget	Director: Andrea Luka Zimmerman	LUX	Documentary	
F E B R U A R Y	11	Final Portrait	Director: Stanley Tucci; Cast: Geoffrey Rush, Armie Hammer, Clémence Poésy, Tony Shalhoub, James Faulkner, Sylvie Testud	Vertigo Releasing (co-produced by United States)	Drama	
F E B R U A R Y	12	Viceroy's House	Director: Gurinder Chadha; Cast: Hugh Bonneville, Gillian Anderson, Manish Dayal, Huma Qureshi, David Hayman, Michael Gambon	20th Century Fox; Based on the life of Lord Louis Mountbatten, and the Partition of India (co-produced by India)	Historical drama	
F E B R U A R Y	13	The Party	Director: Sally Potter; Cast: Patricia Clarkson, Bruno Ganz, Emily Mortimer, Cillian Murphy, Kristin Scott Thomas, Timothy Spall	Picturehouse Entertainment	Black comedy	
F E B R U A R Y	23	Bitter Harvest	Director: George Mendeluk; Cast: Max Irons, Samantha Barks, Barry Pepper, Tamer Hassan, Terence Stamp	Arrow Films; Based on the event of Holodomor (co-produced by Canada)	Drama war film romance	
F E B R U A R Y	24	Division 19	Director: S. A. Halewood; Cast: Linus Roache, Lotte Verbeek, Clarke Peters, Jamie Draven, Alison Doody	Picturehouse Entertainment (co-produced by United States)	Political thriller	
F E B R U A R Y	24	Waiting for You	Director: Charles Garrad; Cast: Colin Morgan, Fanny Ardant, Audrey Basten, Abdelkrim Bahloul	Sky Cinema (TV) (co-produced by France)	Drama	
F E B R U A R Y	26	Mad to Be Normal	Director: Robert Mullan; Cast: David Tennant, Elisabeth Moss, Gabriel Byrne, Michael Gambon, David Bamber, Olivia Poulet, Trevor White	GSP Studios International; Based on the life of R. D. Laing	Biographical drama	
M A R C H	1	Don't Take Me Home	Director: Jonny Owen; Cast: Gareth Bale, Chris Coleman, Aaron Ramsey, Gary Speed (archive footage), Ashley Williams	Spirit Entertainment; National Amusements UK Ltd	Documentary	
M A R C H	3	The Black Prince	Director: Kavi Raz; Cast: Satinder Sartaj, Amanda Root, Jason Flemyng, Atul Sharma, Rup Magon	Eagle Films; Based on the life of Duleep Singh (co-produced by India and United States)	Historical drama	
M A R C H	8	The Zookeeper's Wife	Director: Niki Caro; Cast: Jessica Chastain, Johan Heldenbergh, Daniel Brühl	Focus Features; Based on the lives of Jan and Antonina Żabiński, and The Zookeeper's Wife by Diane Ackerman (co-produced by United States)	War drama	
M A R C H	10	The Time of Their Lives	Director: Roger Goldby; Cast: Joan Collins, Pauline Collins, Franco Nero, Ronald Pickup	Vertigo Films	Road comedy	
M A R C H	11	Baby Driver	Director: Edgar Wright; Cast: Ansel Elgort, Kevin Spacey, Lily James, Eiza González, Jon Hamm, Jamie Foxx, Jon Bernthal	Sony Pictures Releasing (co-produced by United States)	Musical action crime	
M A R C H	16	Another Mother's Son	Director: Christopher Menaul; Cast: Jenny Seagrove, Julian Kostov, Ronan Keating, John Hannah, Amanda Abbington	Vertigo Films; Based on the life of Louisa Gould	War drama	
M A R C H	31	Finding Fatimah	Director: Oz Arshad; Cast: Danny Ashok, Asmara Gabrielle, Nina Wadia, Wahab Sheikh, Mandeep Dhillon	Icon Film Distribution; Penny Appeal	Romantic comedy	

=== April – June ===
Opening		Title	Cast and crew	Details	Genre(s)	Ref.
A P R I L	22	The Trip to Spain	Director: Michael Winterbottom; Cast: Steve Coogan, Rob Brydon, Claire Keelan, Marta Barrio, Kyle Soller	IFC Films; Based on The Trip and sequel to The Trip to Italy	Comedy	
A P R I L	25	Churchill	Director: Jonathan Teplitzky; Cast: Brian Cox, Miranda Richardson, John Slattery, Julian Wadham, Richard Durden, Ella Purnell	Cohen Media Group; Based on the life of Sir Winston Churchill	Historical war drama	
M A Y	5	Unlocked	Directors: Michael Apted; Cast: Noomi Rapace, Orlando Bloom, Toni Collette, John Malkovich, Michael Douglas	Lionsgate (co-produced by United States)	Thriller	
M A Y	8	King Arthur: Legend of the Sword	Directors: Guy Ritchie; Cast: Charlie Hunnam, Àstrid Bergès-Frisbey, Djimon Hounsou, Aidan Gillen, Jude Law, Eric Bana	Warner Bros. Pictures; Inspired by Arthurian legends (co-produced by Australia and United States)	Epic fantasy	
M A Y	11	Interlude in Prague	Directors: John Stephenson; Cast: Aneurin Barnard, James Purefoy, Samantha Barks, Morfydd Clark	Carnaby Film Sales & Distribution; Based on the life of Wolfgang Amadeus Mozart (co-produced by Czech Republic)	Biographical-drama	
M A Y	11	The Killing of a Sacred Deer	Directors: Yorgos Lanthimos; Cast: Colin Farrell, Nicole Kidman, Barry Keoghan, Raffey Cassidy, Sunny Suljic	Curzon Artificial Eye; Based on Iphigenia at Aulis by Euripides (co-produced by Ireland)	Psychological horror	
M A Y	12	Jawbone	Directors: Thomas Q. Napper; Cast: Johnny Harris, Ray Winstone, Ian McShane, Michael Smiley	Vertigo Films	Drama	
M A Y	19	A Prayer Before Dawn	Directors: Jean-Stéphane Sauvaire; Cast: Joe Cole, Vithaya Pansringar, Panya Yimmumphai	Altitude Film Distribution; Based on A Prayer Before Dawn by Billy Moore, and on the life of Billy Moore (co-produced by China, France and United States)	Biographical action	
M A Y	21	How to Talk to Girls at Parties	Directors: John Cameron Mitchell; Cast: Elle Fanning, Alex Sharp, Nicole Kidman, Ruth Wilson, Matt Lucas	StudioCanal UK; Based on How to Talk to Girls at Parties by Neil Gaiman (co-produced by United States)	Science-fiction romantic comedy	
M A Y	25	I Am Not a Witch	Directors: Rungano Nyoni; Cast: Maggie Mulubwa, Nellie Munamonga, Dyna Mufuni, Nancy Murilo	Curzon Artificial Eye (co-produced by France, Germany and Zambia)	Drama	
M A Y	27	You Were Never Really Here	Directors: Lynne Ramsay; Cast: Joaquin Phoenix, Ekaterina Samsonov, Alex Manette, John Doman, Judith Roberts	StudioCanal; Based on You Were Never Really Here by Jonathan Ames (co-produced by France and United States)	Thriller	
J U N E	9	My Cousin Rachel	Director: Roger Michell; Cast: Rachel Weisz, Sam Claflin, Iain Glen, Holliday Grainger	Fox Searchlight Pictures; Based on My Cousin Rachel by Daphne du Maurier (co-produced by United States)	Romantic drama	
J U N E	9	My Name Is Lenny	Director: Ron Scalpello; Cast: Josh Helman, Chanel Cresswell, Michael Bisping, John Hurt	Lionsgate; Based on the life of Lenny McLean	Sports drama	
J U N E	11	Even When I Fall	Directors: Kate McLarnon, Sky Neal	Hakawati (co-produced by Nepal)	Documentary	
J U N E	12	47 Meters Down	Director: Johannes Roberts; Cast: Claire Holt, Mandy Moore, Chris J. Johnson, Yani Gellman, Santiago Segura	eOne Films (co-produced by United States)	Survival horror	
J U N E	12	Loving Vincent	Directors: Dorota Kobiela, Hugh Welchman; Cast: Robert Gulaczyk, Douglas Booth, Jerome Flynn, Saoirse Ronan, Helen McCrory, Chris O'Dowd	Altitude Film Distribution; Based on the life of Vincent van Gogh (co-produced by Poland and United States)	Animated biographical drama	
J U N E	19	The Rizen	Director: Matt Mitchell; Cast: Laura Swift, Sally Phillips, Tom Goodman-Hill, Julian Rhind-Tutt, Adrian Edmondson, Bruce Payne	Uncork'd Entertainment	Horror	
J U N E	22	The Last Photograph	Director: Danny Huston; Cast: Danny Houston, Sarita Choudhury, Stacy Martin	Based on The Last Photograph by Simon Astaire	Drama	
J U N E	22	Modern Life Is Rubbish	Director: Daniel Jerome Gill; Cast: Josh Whitehouse, Freya Mavor, Tom Riley, Daisy Bevan, Ian Hart	Based on short film Modern Life Is Rubbish by Daniel Jerome Gill	Romantic comedy	
J U N E	22	That Good Night	Director: Eric Styles; Cast: John Hurt, Charles Dance, Sofia Helin, Max Brown, Erin Richards, Noah Jupe	Trafalgar Releasing; Based on That Good Night by N. J. Crisp	Drama	
J U N E	23	Hampstead	Director: Joel Hopkins; Cast: Diane Keaton, Brendan Gleeson, Lesley Manville, Jason Watkins, James Norton, Phil Davis	Entertainment One Films	Drama	
J U N E	23	Edith Walks	Director: Andrew Kötting; Cast: Andrew Kotting, David Aylward, Claurdia Barton	HOME Artist Film	Experimental documentary	
J U N E	24	My Pure Land	Director: Sarmad Masud; Cast: Suhaee Abro, Salman Ahmed Khan, Tanveer Hussain Syed, Razia Malik, Tayyab Ifzal, Eman Fatima	Bill Kenwright Films	Drama	
J U N E	25	The Marker	Director: Justin Edgar; Cast: Frederick Schmidt, Ana Ularu, John Hannah	Kaleidoscope	Crime thriller	
J U N E	26	Edie	Director: Simon Hunter; Cast: Sheila Hancock, Kevin Guthrie, Paul Brannigan, Amy Manson, Wendy Morgan	Arrow Films	Drama	
J U N E	26	Halal Daddy	Director: Conor McDermottroe; Cast: Sarah Bolger, Colm Meaney, David Kross, Art Malik	Element Pictures Distribution (co-produced by Ireland and Germany)	Comedy	

=== July – September ===
Opening		Title	Cast and crew	Details	Genre(s)	Ref.
J U L Y	1	The Crucifixion	Director: Xavier Gens; Cast: Sophie Cookson, Brittany Ashworth, Corneliu Ulici	Lionsgate; Based on the Tanacu exorcism (co-produced by Romania and United States)	Horror	
J U L Y	2	England Is Mine	Director: Mark Gill; Cast: Jack Lowden, Jessica Brown Findlay, Laurie Kynaston, Adam Lawrence	GEM Entertainment; Based on the life of Morrissey	Biographical drama	
J U L Y	10	Anti Matter	Director: Keir Burrows Cast: Yaiza Figueroa, Philippa Carson, Tom-Barber Duffy, Noah Maxwell Clarke, James Farrar	The Cast Iron Picture Co. (distributed by Uncork'd Entertainment)	Sci-fi thriller	
J U L Y	13	Dunkirk	Director: Christopher Nolan; Cast: Fionn Whitehead, Harry Styles, Aneurin Barnard, James D'Arcy, Barry Keoghan, Kenneth Branagh, Cillian Murphy, Mark Rylance, Tom Hardy	Warner Bros. Pictures; Based on the Dunkirk evacuation (co-produced by France, Netherlands and United States)	War action thriller	
J U L Y	15	Maze	Director: Stephen Burke; Cast: Tom Vaughan-Lawlor, Barry Ward	Lionsgate Films (co-produced by Germany, Ireland and Sweden)	Crime drama	
A U G U S T	4	6 Days	Director: Toa Fraser; Cast: Jamie Bell, Abbie Cornish, Mark Strong, Tim Pigott-Smith	Icon Film Distribution; Based on the 1980 Iranian Embassy siege in London (co-produced by New Zealand)	Biographical action	
A U G U S T	4	Williams	Director: Morgan Matthews; Cast: Frank Williams	Curzon Artificial Eye	Documentary	
A U G U S T	7	Monster Family	Director: Holger Tappe; Cast: Emily Watson, Nick Frost, Jessica Brown Findlay, Celia Imrie, Catherine Tate, Jason Isaacs	Altitude Film Distribution; Based on Happy Family by David Safier (co-produced by Germany)	Horror comedy	
A U G U S T	13	Tulip Fever	Director: Justin Chadwick; Cast: Alicia Vikander, Dane DeHaan, Zach Galifianakis, Jack O'Connell, Holliday Grainger, Judi Dench, Christoph Waltz, Cara Delevingne	Worldview Entertainment; Based on Tulip Fever by Deborah Moggach (co-produced by United States)	Historical drama	
A U G U S T	31	Pin Cushion	Director: Deborah Haywood; Cast: Lily Newmark, Joanna Scanlan, Isy Suttie	Munro Film Services	Drama	
S E P T E M B E R	1	Darkest Hour	Director: Joe Wright; Cast: Gary Oldman, Kristin Scott Thomas, Lily James, Stephen Dillane, Ronald Pickup, Ben Mendelsohn	Focus Features; Based on the life of Winston Churchill (co-produced by United States)	Drama	
S E P T E M B E R	1	Eat Locals	Director: Jason Flemyng; Cast: Eve Myles, Charlie Cox, Mackenzie Crook, Dexter Fletcher, Tony Curran, Freema Agyeman	Evolution Pictures	Horror comedy	
S E P T E M B E R	1	Film Stars Don't Die in Liverpool	Director: Paul McGuigan; Cast: Annette Bening, Jamie Bell, Vanessa Redgrave, Julie Walters, Kenneth Cranham	Lionsgate; Based on Film Stars Don't Die in Liverpool by Peter Turner (co-produced by United States)	Biographical romantic drama	
S E P T E M B E R	1	Lean on Pete	Director: Andrew Haigh; Cast: Charlie Plummer, Chloë Sevigny, Travis Fimmel, Steve Buscemi	Curzon Artificial Eye; Based on Lean on Pete by Willy Vlautin	Drama	
S E P T E M B E R	1	Stratton	Director: Simon West; Cast: Dominic Cooper, Gemma Chan, Austin Stowell, Tyler Hoechlin, Tom Felton	Vertigo Releasing; Based on the Stratton series by Duncan Falconer	Action thriller	
S E P T E M B E R	2	Battle of the Sexes	Directors: Jonathan Dayton, Valerie Faris; Cast: Emma Stone, Steve Carell, Andrea Riseborough, Sarah Silverman, Bill Pullman, Alan Cumming, Elisabeth Shue, Austin Stowell, Eric Christian Olsen	Universal Pictures; Loosely based on the 1973 tennis match between Billie Jean King and Bobby Riggs (co-produced by United States)	Biographical comedy drama	
S E P T E M B E R	3	Victoria & Abdul	Director: Stephen Frears; Cast: Judi Dench, Ali Fazal, Eddie Izzard, Adeel Akhtar, Paul Higgins, Michael Gambon, Olivia Williams	Universal Pictures; Based on the lives of Queen Victoria and Abdul Karim, and Victoria & Abdul by Shrabani Basu	Biographical comedy-drama	
S E P T E M B E R	4	Three Billboards Outside Ebbing, Missouri	Director: Martin McDonagh; Cast: Frances McDormand, Woody Harrelson, Sam Rockwell, Caleb Landry Jones, John Hawkes, Peter Dinklage	Fox Searchlight Pictures (co-produced by United States)	Drama	
S E P T E M B E R	5	My Generation	Director: David Batty; Cast: Michael Caine, David Bailey, Roger Daltrey, Marianne Faithfull, Paul McCartney, Mary Quant, Twiggy	Lionsgate	Documentary	
S E P T E M B E R	7	Dark River	Director: Clio Barnard; Cast: Ruth Wilson, Mark Stanley, Sean Bean	Arrow Films	Drama	
S E P T E M B E R	7	The Hungry	Director: Bornila Chatterjee; Cast: Naseeruddin Shah, Tisca Chopra, Antonio Aakeel, Neeraj Kabi, Sayani Gupta, Arjun Gupta, Suraj Sharma, Jayant Kripalani	Based on Titus Andronicus by William Shakespeare (co-produced by India)	Drama	
S E P T E M B E R	7	On Chesil Beach	Director: Dominic Cooke; Cast: Saoirse Ronan, Billy Howle, Emily Watson, Anne-Marie Duff, Samuel West, Adrian Scarborough	Lionsgate; Based on On Chesil Beach by Ian McEwan	Drama	
S E P T E M B E R	8	Apostasy	Director: Daniel Kokotajlo (director); Cast: Siobhan Finneran, Robert Emms, Sacha Parkinson, Steve Evets, Jessica Baglow		Drama	
S E P T E M B E R	8	The Death of Stalin	Director: Armando Iannucci; Cast: Steve Buscemi, Simon Russell Beale, Jason Isaacs, Michael Palin, Andrea Riseborough, Jeffrey Tambor, Rupert Friend	eOne Films; Based on La mort de Staline by Fabien Nury and Thierry Robin (co-produced by Belgium and France)	Political satire	
S E P T E M B E R	8	The Escape	Director: Dominic Savage; Cast: Gemma Arterton, Dominic Cooper, Frances Barber, Marthe Keller, Jalil Lespert	IFC Films	Drama	
S E P T E M B E R	8	Gun Shy	Director: Simon West; Cast: Antonio Banderas, Olga Kurylenko	Saban Films	Action comedy	
S E P T E M B E R	8	Journey's End	Director: Saul Dibb; Cast: Sam Claflin, Asa Butterfield, Paul Bettany, Tom Sturridge, Toby Jones	Lionsgate; Based on Journey's End by R. C. Sherriff	War	
S E P T E M B E R	8	My Days of Mercy	Director: Tali Shalom Ezer; Cast: Kate Mara, Elliot Page, (Note: Credited as Ellen Page; the film was released before Page came out as transgender.) Amy Seimetz, Brian Geraghty, Elias Koteas	Signature Entertainment	Romantic drama	
S E P T E M B E R	8	The Ritual	Director: David Bruckner; Cast: Rafe Spall, Arsher Ali, Robert James-Collier, Sam Troughton	eOne Films; Based on The Ritual by Adam Nevill	Horror	
S E P T E M B E R	9	Beast	Director: Michael Pearce; Cast: Jessie Buckley, Johnny Flynn, Geraldine James	Altitude Film Entertainment	Psychological thriller	
S E P T E M B E R	9	The Children Act	Director: Richard Eyre; Cast: Emma Thompson, Stanley Tucci, Fionn Whitehead, Ben Chaplin, Eileen Walsh	FilmNation; Based on The Children Act by Ian McEwan	Drama	
S E P T E M B E R	9	I Kill Giants	Director: Anders Walter; Cast: Madison Wolfe, Imogen Poots, Sydney Wade, Rory Jackson, Zoe Saldaña	RLJE Films; Based on I Kill Giants by Kelly and Ken Niimura (co-produced by Belgium, China and United States)	Fantasy thriller	
S E P T E M B E R	9	Mary Shelley	Director: Haifaa al-Mansour; Cast: Elle Fanning, Douglas Booth, Bel Powley, Ben Hardy, Tom Sturridge, Maisie Williams, Stephen Dillane, Joanne Froggatt	IFC Films; Based on the life of Mary Shelley (co-produced by Australia, Ireland, Luxembourg and United States)	Romantic	
S E P T E M B E R	10	Disobedience	Director: Sebastián Lelio; Cast: Rachel Weisz, Rachel McAdams, Alessandro Nivola, Anton Lesser	Curzon Artificial Eye; Based on Disobedience by Naomi Alderman (co-produced by Ireland and United States)	Drama	
S E P T E M B E R	10	Woman Walks Ahead	Director: Susanna White; Cast: Jessica Chastain, Michael Greyeyes, Sam Rockwell, Ciarán Hinds, Chaske Spencer, Bill Camp	Based on the life of Caroline Weldon (co-produced by United States)	Biographical drama	
S E P T E M B E R	11	Breathe	Director: Andy Serkis; Cast: Andrew Garfield, Claire Foy, Tom Hollander, Hugh Bonneville	STXinternational; Based on the life of Robin Cavendish	Biographical drama	
S E P T E M B E R	12	The Wife	Director: Björn Runge; Cast: Glenn Close, Jonathan Pryce, Christian Slater, Annie Starke, Max Irons, Elizabeth McGovern, Harry Lloyd	GEM Entertainment; Based on The Wife by Meg Wolitzer (co-produced by Sweden and United States)	Drama	
S E P T E M B E R	15	Crowhurst	Director: Simon Rumley; Cast: Justin Salinger, Amy Loughton, Edwin Flay, Glyn Dilley, Christopher Hale	StudioCanal; Based on the life of Donald Crowhurst	Drama	
S E P T E M B E R	18	Kingsman: The Golden Circle	Director: Matthew Vaughn; Cast: Colin Firth, Julianne Moore, Taron Egerton, Mark Strong, Halle Berry, Elton John, Channing Tatum, Jeff Bridges	20th Century Fox; Based on characters by Jane Goldman and Matthew Vaughn, Kingsman by Mark Millar and Dave Gibbons; Sequel to Kingsman: The Secret Service (co-produced by United States)	Spy comedy	
S E P T E M B E R	20	Goodbye Christopher Robin	Director: Simon Curtis; Cast: Domhnall Gleeson, Margot Robbie, Kelly Macdonald, Will Tilston, Alex Lawther	20th Century Fox; Based on the life of A. A. Milne	Biographical drama	
S E P T E M B E R	22	Anna and the Apocalypse	Director: John McPhail; Cast: Ella Hunt, Malcolm Cumming, Sarah Swire, Christopher Leveaux, Ben Wiggins, Marli Siu, Mark Benton	Vertigo Releasing	Christmas horror-musical	
S E P T E M B E R	23	Bees Make Honey	Director: Jack Eve; Cast: Alice Eve, Hermione Corfield, Joshua McGuire, Joséphine de La Baume, Anatole Taubman, Trevor Eve	Content Media Corporation Intl Ltd.	Dark comedy Mystery; Drama	
S E P T E M B E R	24	The Foreigner	Director: Martin Campbell; Cast: Jackie Chan, Pierce Brosnan, Michael McElhatton, Charlie Murphy, Orla Brady, Katie Leung, Ray Fearon, Dermot Crowley, Rory Fleck-Byrne	20th Century Fox; Based on The Chinaman by Stephen Leather (co-produced by China)	Action thriller	

=== October – December ===
Opening		Title	Cast and crew	Details	Genre(s)	Ref.
O C T O B E R	5	Ghost Stories	Directors: Andy Nyman, Jeremy Dyson; Cast: Andy Nyman, Martin Freeman, Alex Lawther, Nicholas Burns, Jill Halfpenny	Lionsgate Films; Based on Ghost Stories by Andy Nyman and Jeremy Dyson	Horror	
O C T O B E R	6	A Moment in the Reeds	Director: Mikko Mäkelä; Cast: Janne Puustinen, Boodi Kabbani, Mika Melender, Virpi Rautsiala	Peccadillo Pictures (co-produced by Finland)	Romantic drama	
O C T O B E R	7	Kingdom of Us	Director: Lucy Cohen	Netflix	Documentary	
O C T O B E R	7	The Snowman	Director: Tomas Alfredson; Cast: Michael Fassbender, Rebecca Ferguson, Charlotte Gainsbourg, Val Kilmer, J. K. Simmons	Universal Pictures; Based on The Snowman by Jo Nesbø	Crime thriller	
O C T O B E R	9	Funny Cow	Director: Adrian Shergold; Cast: Maxine Peake, Stephen Graham, Paddy Considine, Tony Pitts, Alun Armstrong, Lindsey Coulson	Entertainment One	Comedy drama	
O C T O B E R	12	Journeyman	Director: Paddy Considine; Cast: Paddy Considine, Jodie Whittaker, Anthony Welsh	StudioCanal UK	Drama	
O C T O B E R	13	The Forgiven	Director: Roland Joffé; Cast: Forest Whitaker, Eric Bana, Jeff Gum	GEM Entertainment; Based on The Archbishop and the Antichrist by Michael Ashton (co-produced by South Africa)	Drama	
O C T O B E R	14	Zoo	Director: Colin McIvor; Cast: Art Parkinson, Penelope Wilton, Toby Jones, Ian O’Reilly, Ian McElhinney, Amy Huberman	Entertainment One; Loosely based on Denise Weston Austin (co-produced by Ireland)	Historical drama war	
O C T O B E R	21	The Bookshop	Director: Isabel Coixet; Cast: Emily Mortimer, Patricia Clarkson, Bill Nighy, Honor Kneafsey, James Lance	Celsius Entertainment; Based on The Bookshop by Penelope Fitzgerald (co-produced by Germany and Spain)	Drama	
O C T O B E R	31	Crooked House	Director: Gilles Paquet-Brenner; Cast: Glenn Close, Terence Stamp, Max Irons, Stefanie Martini, Julian Sands, Honor Kneafsey, Christian McKay, Amanda Abbington, Gillian Anderson, Christina Hendricks	Sony Pictures; Based on Crooked House by Agatha Christie	Mystery	
N O V E M B E R	2	Murder on the Orient Express	Directors: Kenneth Branagh; Cast: Kenneth Branagh, Daisy Ridley, Josh Gad, Derek Jacobi, Leslie Odom Jr., Tom Bateman, Penélope Cruz, Willem Dafoe, Judi Dench, Michelle Pfeiffer, Olivia Colman, Lucy Boynton, Johnny Depp	20th Century Fox; Based on Murder on the Orient Express by Agatha Christie (co-produced by Malt and United States)	Mystery drama	
N O V E M B E R	5	Paddington 2	Directors: Paul King; Cast: Ben Whishaw, Hugh Bonneville, Sally Hawkins, Brendan Gleeson, Julie Walters, Jim Broadbent, Peter Capaldi, Hugh Grant	StudioCanal; Based on the character Paddington Bear, and sequel to Paddington	Live-action animated comedy	
N O V E M B E R	19	Time Trial	Directors: Finlay Pretsell; Cast: David Millar	Based on David Millar's professional cycling career	Documentary	
N O V E M B E R	24	Finding Your Feet	Directors: Richard Loncraine; Cast: Imelda Staunton, Timothy Spall, Celia Imrie, Joanna Lumley, David Hayman, John Sessions, Josie Lawrence	Entertainment One (co-produced by Australia, Canada and United States)	Romantic comedy drama	
N O V E M B E R	28	The Mercy	Director: James Marsh; Cast: Colin Firth, Rachel Weisz, David Thewlis, Ken Stott	StudioCanal; Based on the life of Donald Crowhurst	Drama	
D E C E M B E R	15	You, Me and Him	Director: Daisy Aitkens; Cast: David Tennant, Lucy Punch, Faye Marsay, David Warner, Sarah Parish, Christian Brassington, Gemma Jones, Nina Sosanya, Simon Bird, Sally Phillips, Peter Davison		Comedy	
D E C E M B E R	18	All the Money in the World	Director: Ridley Scott; Cast: Michelle Williams, Christopher Plummer, Mark Wahlberg, Romain Duris, Charlie Plummer	TriStar Pictures; Based on Painfully Rich: The Outrageous Fortunes and Misfortunes of the Heirs of J. Paul Getty by John Pearson (co-produced by United States)	Crime thriller	

=== Other premieres ===
Title	Director	Release date	Ref.
Access All Areas	Bryn Higgins	30 June 2017 (Edinburgh International Film Festival)	
Alan Hinkes: The First Briton To Climb The World's Highest Mountains	Terry Abraham	14 October 2017	
Almost Heaven	Carol Salter	15 February 2017 (Berlin International Film Festival)	
Amazon Adventure	Mike Slee	18 April 2017	
Another News Story	Orban Wallace	4 July 2017 (Karlovy Vary International Film Festival)	
Arcadia	Paul Wright	8 October 2017	
Bad Day for the Cut	Chris Baugh	22 January 2017 (Sundance Film Festival)	
The Book of Birdie	Elizabeth E. Schuch	30 January 2017 (Göteborg Film Festival)	
Borstal	Steven M. Smith	6 March 2017	
Canaries	Peter Stray	26 August 2017 (Horror Channel FrightFest)	
Caught	Jamie Patterson	February 2017 (Fantasporto International Film Festival)	
A Change in the Weather	Jon Sanders	7 July 2017	
Damascene	Freddy Syborn	15 October 2017 (New Orleans Film Festival)	
Dangerous Game	Richard Colton	26 June 2017	
Dark Beacon	Coz Greenop (as Corrie Greenop)	13 October 2017	
Double Date	Benjamin Barfoot	30 June 2017 (Edinburgh International Film Festival)	
Eat Locals	Jason Flemyng	6 April 2017	
Eating Animals	Christopher Dillon Quinn	2 September 2017 (Telluride Film Festival)	
Eric Clapton: Life in 12 Bars	Lili Fini Zanuck	8 September 2017 (Toronto International Film Festival)	
Fanged Up	Christian James	25 August 2017	
Ferrari: Race To Immortality	Daryl Goodrich	29 October 2017 (Rome Film Festival)	
Freehold (a.k.a. Two Pigeons)	Dominic Bridges	10 March 2017 (South by Southwest Film Festival)	
Gatwick Gangsters	Sid Clack, David Manning	6 November 2017	
Gholam	Mitra Tabrizian	25 May 2017 (Seattle International Film Festival)	
Gloves Off	Steven Nesbit	8 October 2017 (Sitges International Festival of Fantastic and Horror Cinema)	
Going for Golden Eye	Jim Miskell	25 August 2017 (Hebden Bridge)	
Grace Jones: Bloodlight and Bami	Sophie Fiennes	7 September 2017 (Toronto International Film Festival)	
Granny of the Dead	Tudley James	14 July 2017	
Habit	Simeon Halligan	5 October 2017 (Grimmfest)	
The Hatching	Michael Anderson	2 September 2017 (DVD premiere)	
Here to Be Heard: The Story of the Slits	William E. Badgley	14 October 2017 (London Film Festival)	
Hex	George Popov, Jonathan Russell	17 November 2017	
Hi-Lo Joe	James Kermack	24 November 2017	
The Howling	Steven M. Smith	9 October 2017	
The Iconoclast	King Adz	16 November 2017 (DOC NYC)	
In Extremis	Steve Stone	12 October 2017 (American Horror Film Festival)	
Island	Steven Eastwood	7 October 2017 (London Film Festival)	
Kenny	Stewart Sugg	20 November 2017	
King Arthur: Excalibur Rising	Antony Smith	1 March 2017	
Leaning in the Wind: Andy Goldsworthy	Thomas Riedelsheimer	8 April 2017 (San Francisco International Film Festival)	
Lek and the Dogs	Andrew Kötting	14 October 2017 (London Film Festival)	
Lies We Tell	Mitu Misra	21 September 2017 (Raindance Film Festival)	
The Little Vampire 3D	Richard Claus, Karsten Kiilerich	1 October 2017	
London Heist (a.k.a. Gunned Down)	Mark McQueen	17 July 2017	
A Love That Never Dies	Jimmy Edmonds, Jane Harris	16 March 2017	
Michelangelo: Love and Death	David Bickerstaff	13 June 2017	
Penny Slinger: Out of the Shadows	Richard Kovitch	4 March 2017	
Pickups	Jamie Thraves	18 February 2017 (Dublin Film Festival)	
Pili	Leanne Welham	1 October 2017 (Dinard Festival of British Cinema)	
Pride	Ashley Joiner	25 March 2017 (BFI Flare London LGBTQ+ Film Festival)	
Psycho Vertical	Jen Randall	3 November 2017 (Banff Mountain Film Festival)	
Retreat	Tom Nicoll	26 August 2017 (Screenplay Festival)	
Rise of the Footsoldier 3	Zackary Adler	3 November 2017	
The Royal Exchange	Marc Dugain	27 December 2017	
Seat 25	Nicholas Agnew	14 April 2017 (London Independent Film Festival)	
The Small Woman in Grey	Christopher Downie	1 October 2017	
SOLO!	Nic Cornwall	2017	
Steven Berkoff's Tell Tale Heart	Stephen Cookson	April 2017 (Independent Horror Movie Awards)	
The Stolen	Niall Johnson	23 November 2017	
Tawai: A Voice from the Forest	Bruce Parry, Mark Ellam	10 January 2017 (Calcutta International Cult Film Festival)	
Tides	Tupaq Felber	14 October 2017 (London Film Festival)	
Transhuman	Nicholas Winter	15 April 2017 (London Independent Film Festival)	
uk18	Andrew Tiernan	1 February 2017 (internet)	
Undocument	Amin Bakhshian, Kyla Simone Bruce	13 October 2017 (Heartland Film Festival)	
Us and Them	Joe Martin	10 March 2017 (South by Southwest Film Festival)	
Viking Siege	Jack Burton	26 December 2017	
We Are Tourists	O'ar Pali, Remy Bazerque	1 January 2017	
We Still Steal the Old Way	Sacha Bennett	9 January 2017	
Where the Skin Lies	Michael Boucherie	26 August 2017 (Horror Channel FrightFest)	
The White Room	James Erskine	23 June 2017	

=== Culturally British films ===
The following list comprises films not produced by Great Britain or the United Kingdom but which are strongly associated with British culture. The films in this list should fulfill at least three of the following criteria:

- The film is adapted from a British source material.
- The story is set, at least partially, in the United Kingdom.
- The film was shot, at least partially, in the United Kingdom.
- Many of the film's cast and crew members are British.

Title	Country of origin	Adaptation	Story setting	Film locations	British/UK cast and crew
Atomic Blonde	United States; Germany	The Coldest City by Antony Johnston	London, England	London, United Kingdom	James McAvoy, Eddie Marsan, Toby Jones, James Faulkner
Lost in London	United States		London, England	London, United Kingdom	Eleanor Matsuura, Daniel Radcliffe, Martin McCann, David Avery, Nigel Willoughby (cinematographer)
The Man Who Invented Christmas	Canada; Ireland	A Christmas Carol by Charles Dickens	London, England	London, United Kingdom	Bharat Nalluri (director), Dan Stevens, Jonathan Pryce, Simon Callow, Donald Sumpter, Miriam Margolyes, Morfydd Clark, Miles Jupp, Jamie Pearson (editor)
The Mummy	United States; China; Japan		London, England	London, Oxfordshire and Surrey, United Kingdom	Annabelle Wallis, Kaiser Chiefs (soundtrack), Neil Maskell, Penny Rose (costume designer), Andrew Ackland-Snow (art director), Lucinda Syson (casting director)
Phantom Thread	United States		London and Surrey, England	Cotswolds, Fitzroy Square, and North York Moors National Park in London, and Lythe, United Kingdom	Daniel Day-Lewis, Lesley Manville, Camilla Rutherford, Gina McKee, Julia Davis, Jonny Greenwood (composer)
Transformers: The Last Knight	United States; China		London, Oxford, and Medieval England	Berkshire, Buckinghamshire, Hampshire, Northumberland, North Yorkshire, Oxfordshire, Surrey, Wiltshire, Northern Ireland and Scotland, United Kingdom	Anthony Hopkins, Laura Haddock, Liam Garrigan, Peter Cullen, Gemma Chan, Mark Sanger (editor), Terry Glass (special effects supervisor)
Wonder Woman	United States; China		London, England	Buckinghamshire, Essex, Hertfordshire, Kent, London, Oxfordshire and Surrey, United Kingdom	David Thewlis, Lucy Davis, Ewen Bremner, Rupert Gregson-Williams (composer), Martin Walsh (editor), Lindy Hemming (costume designer), Chris Munro (sound designer)

== British award winners ==
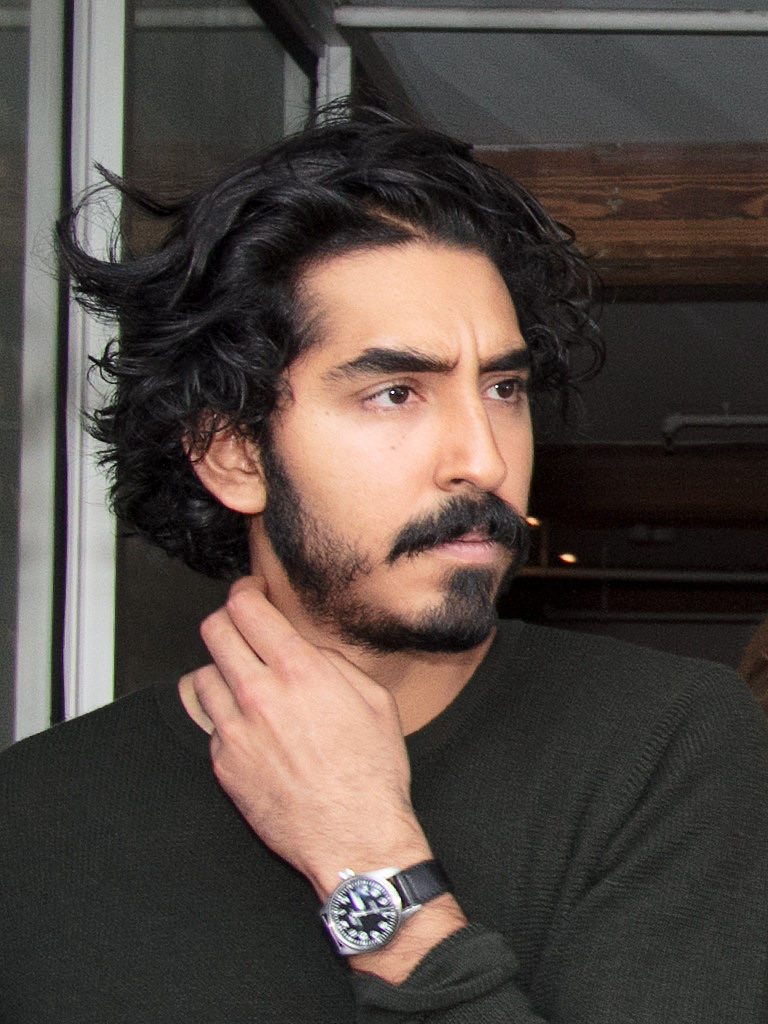
Dev Patel received the BAFTA award and multiple best supporting actor nominations for his performance in Lion.

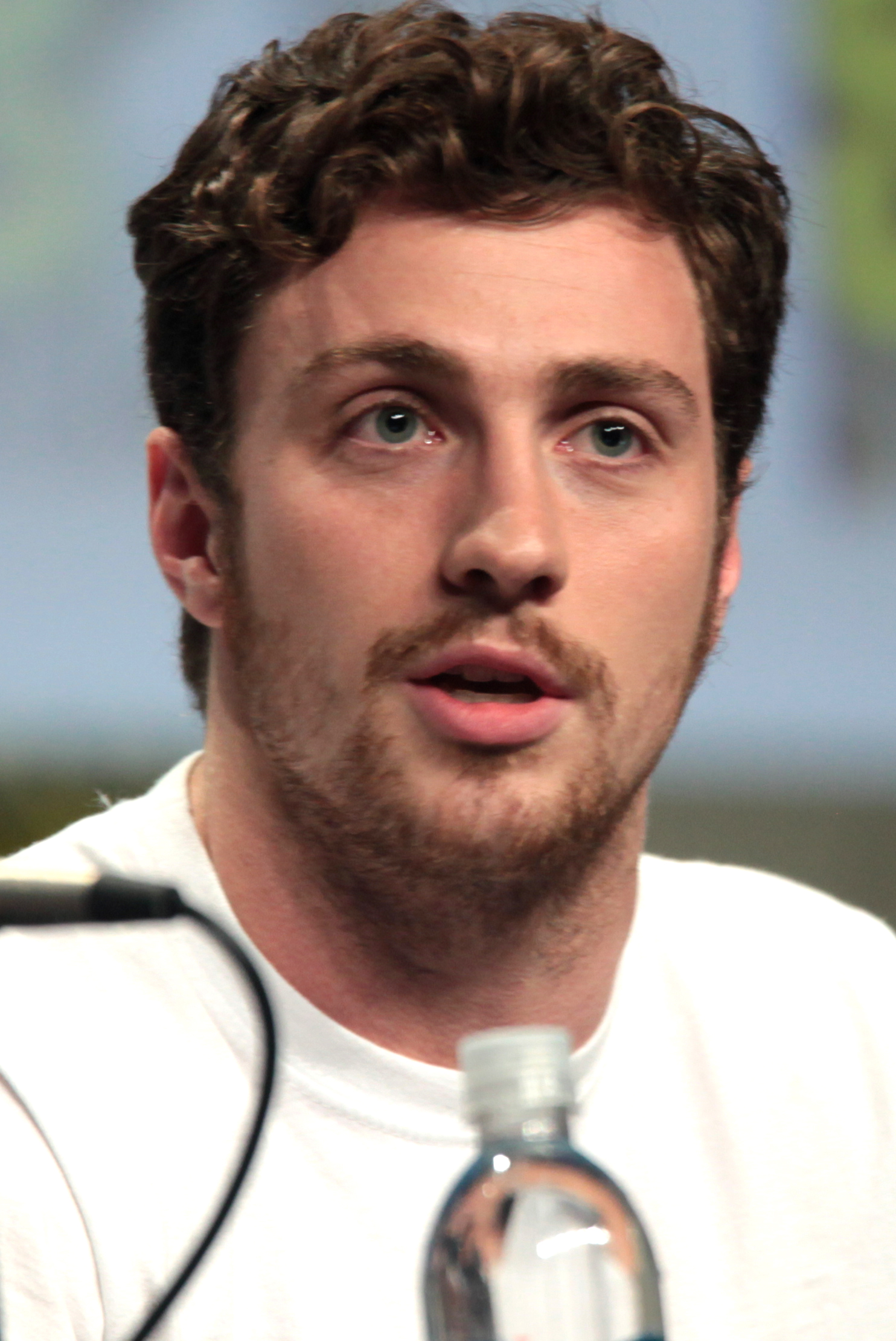
Aaron Taylor-Johnson received the Golden Globe award for best supporting actor in Nocturnal Animals.

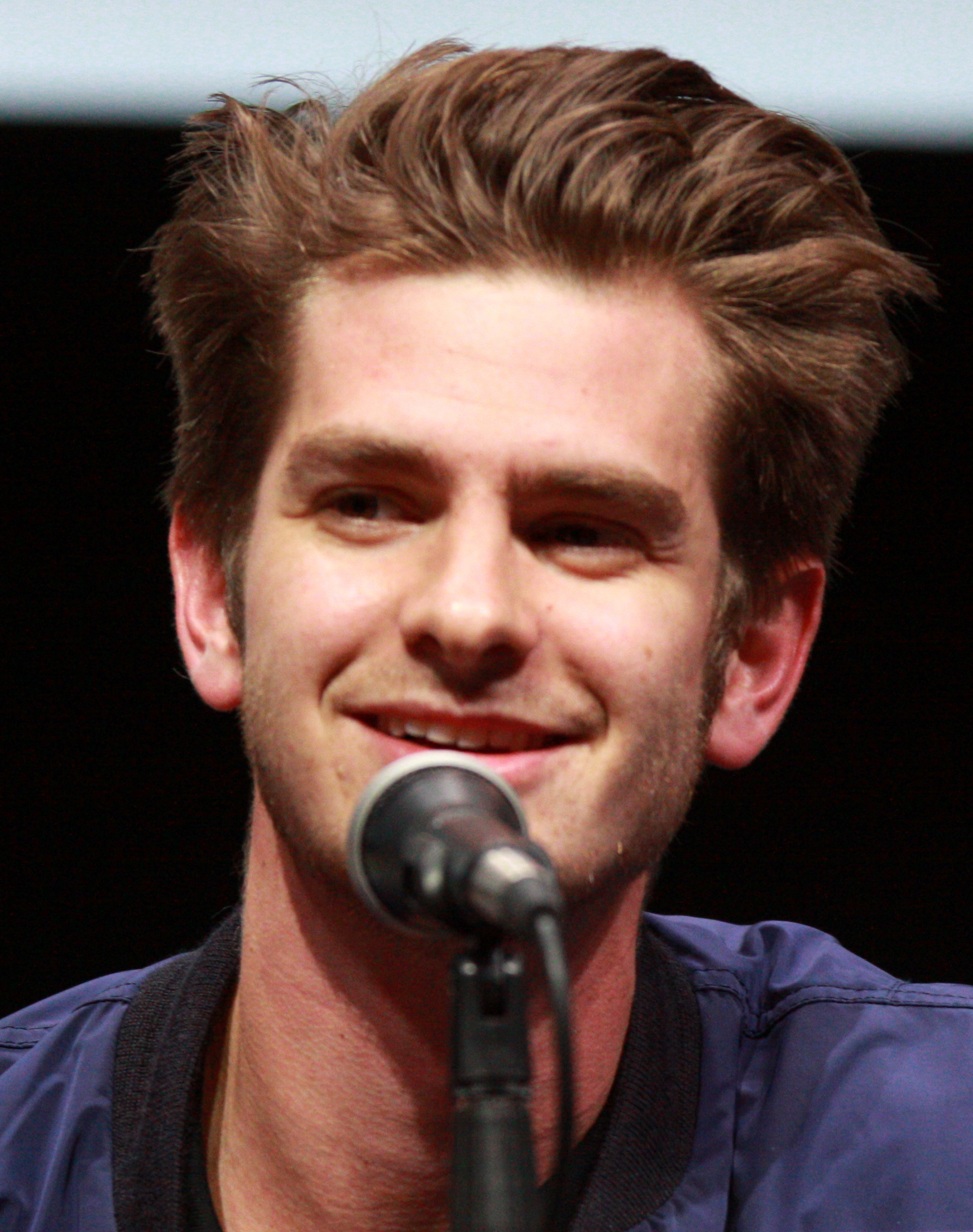
Andrew Garfield received multiple Best Actor nominations for his performance in Hacksaw Ridge.

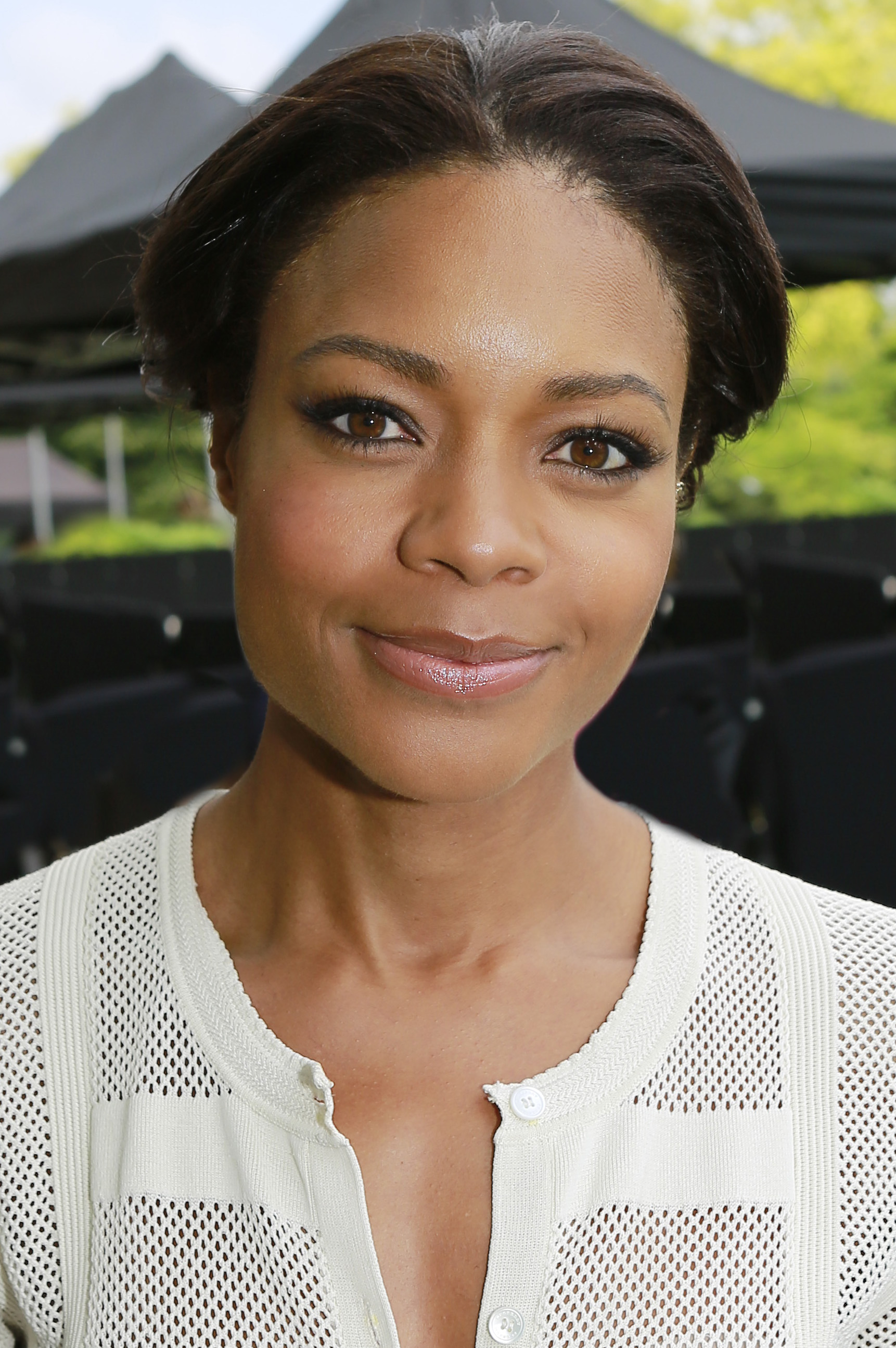
Naomie Harris received multiple Best Supporting Actress nominations for her performance in Moonlight.

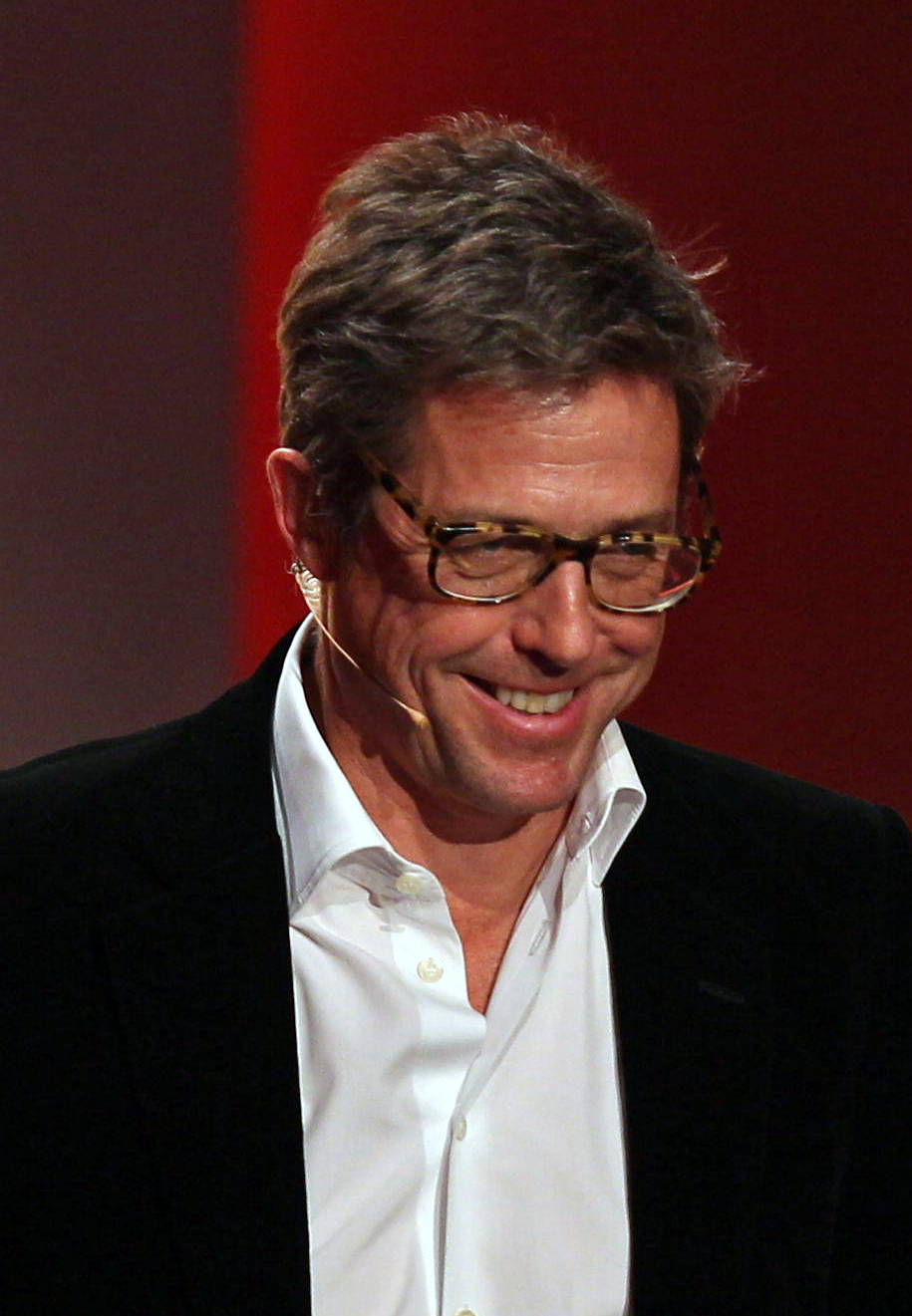
Hugh Grant received multiple Best Supporting Actor nominations for his performance in Florence Foster Jenkins.

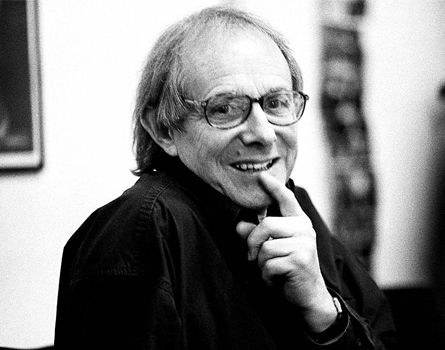
Ken Loach received multiple nominations for his film I, Daniel Blake.

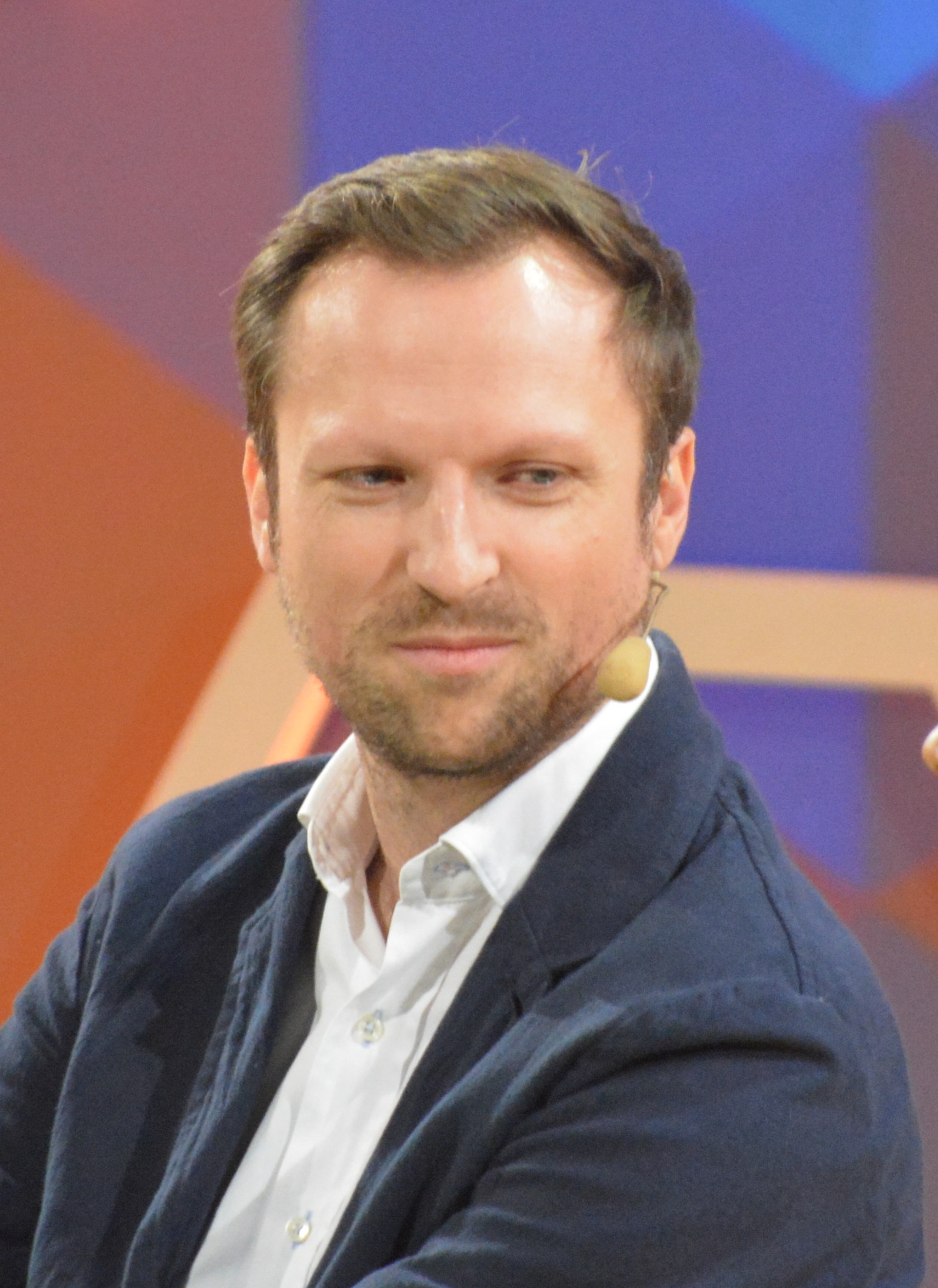
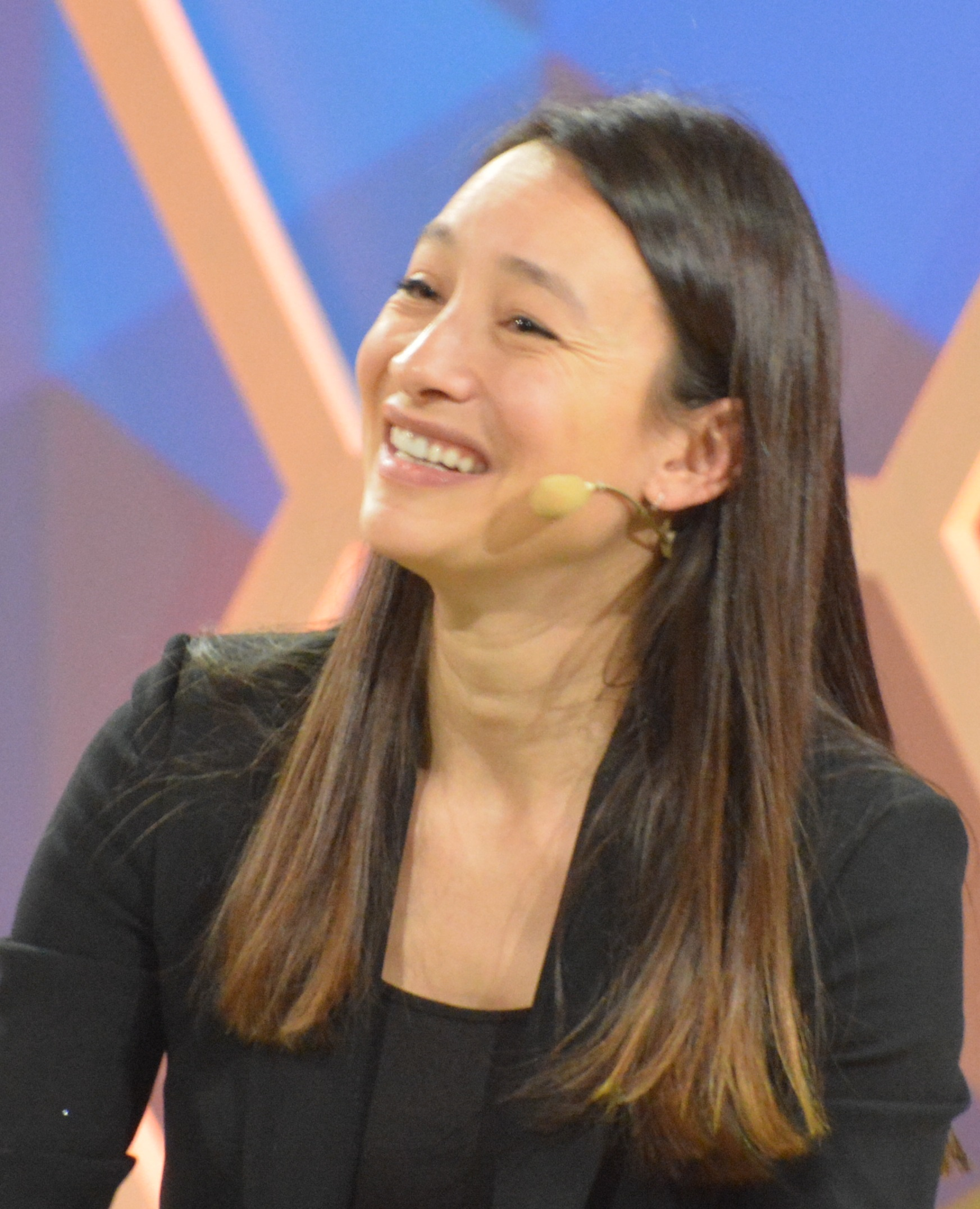
Orlando von Einsiedel and Joanna Natasegara received the BAFTA award for their documentary short The White Helmets.

Mica Levi received multiple Best Original Score nominations for her work in Jackie.

Listed here are the British winners and nominees at the three most prestigious film award ceremonies in the English-speaking world: the Academy Awards, British Academy Film Awards and Golden Globe Awards, that were held during 2017, celebrating the best films of 2016. The British nominations were led by Lion, with Fantastic Beasts and Where to Find Them and Florence Foster Jenkins going on to win a number of technical awards. British films did, however, notably lose out to Moonlight and La La Land from the United States.

=== Academy Awards ===
The 89th Academy Awards honoring the best films of 2016 were held on February 26, 2017.

British winners:

- Fantastic Beasts and Where to Find Them (Best Costume Design)
- The White Helmets (Best Documentary – Short Subject)
- Anne V. Coates (Academy Honorary Award)
- Joanna Natasegara (Best Documentary – Short Subject) – The White Helmets
- Orlando von Einsiedel (Best Documentary – Short Subject) – The White Helmets

British nominees:

- Allied (Best Costume Design)
- Fantastic Beasts and Where to Find Them (Best Production Design)
- Florence Foster Jenkins (Best Actress, Best Costume Design)
- Hail, Caesar! (Best Production Design)
- Lion (Best Picture, Best Supporting Actor, Best Supporting Actress, Best Adapted Screenplay, Best Original Score, Best Cinematography)
- The Lobster (Best Original Screenplay)
- Loving (Best Actress)
- Pear Cider and Cigarettes (Best Animated Short Film)
- Silence (Best Cinematography)
- Watani: My Homeland (Best Documentary – Short Subject)
- Andrew Garfield (Best Actor) – Hacksaw Ridge
- Anna Pinnock (Best Production Design) – Fantastic Beasts and Where to Find Them
- Cara Speller (Best Animated Short Film) – Pear Cider and Cigarettes
- Dev Patel (Best Supporting Actor) – Lion
- Guy Hendrix Dyas (Best Production Design) – Passengers
- Iain Canning (Best Picture) – Lion
- Jake Roberts (Best Film Editing) – Hell or High Water
- Joanna Johnston (Best Costume Design) – Allied
- Joe Walker (Best Film Editing) – Arrival
- Mica Levi (Best Original Score) – Jackie
- Naomie Harris (Best Supporting Actress) – Moonlight
- Oliver Jones (Best Special Effects) – Kubo and the Two Strings
- Neil Corbould (Best Visual Effects) – Rogue One: A Star Wars Story
- Paul Corbould (Best Visual Effects) – Doctor Strange
- Richard Bluff (Best Visual Effects) – Doctor Strange
- Stephen Ellis (Best Documentary – Short Subject) – Watani: My Homeland
- Sting (Best Original Song) – "The Empty Chair" for Jim: The James Foley Story
- Stuart Craig (Best Production Design) – Fantastic Beasts and Where to Find Them
- Stuart Wilson (Best Sound Mixing) – Rogue One: A Star Wars Story

=== British Academy Film Awards ===
The 70th British Academy Film Awards honoring the best films of 2016 were held on February 12, 2017.

British winners:

- Fantastic Beasts and Where to Find Them (Best Production Design)
- Florence Foster Jenkins (Best Makeup and Hair)
- Home (Best Short Film)
- I, Daniel Blake (Outstanding British Film)
- Lion (Best Actor in a Supporting Role, Best Adapted Screenplay)
- Under the Shadow (Outstanding Debut by a British Writer, Director or Producer)
- Curzon Cinemas (Outstanding British Contribution to Cinema)
- Anna Pinnock (Best Production Design) – Fantastic Beasts and Where to Find Them
- Dev Patel (Best Actor in a Supporting Role) – Lion
- Hugh Grant (Best Actor in a Supporting Role) – Florence Foster Jenkins
- Ken Loach (Outstanding British Film) – I, Daniel Blake
- Paul Laverty (Outstanding British Film) – I, Daniel Blake
- Stuart Craig (Best Production Design) – Fantastic Beasts and Where to Find Them
- Tom Holland (EE Rising Star Award)

British nominees:

- Allied (Best Costume Design)
- American Honey (Outstanding British Film)
- The Beatles: Eight Days a Week (Best Documentary)
- Denial (Outstanding British Film)
- Hail, Caesar! (Best Production Design)
- I, Daniel Blake (Best Film, Best Director, Best Actress in a Supporting Role, Best Original Screenplay)
- Fantastic Beasts and Where to Find Them (Outstanding British Film, Best Sound, Best Special Visual Effects, Best Costume Design)
- Florence Foster Jenkins (Best Actress in a Leading Role, Best Actor in a Supporting Role, Best Costume Design)
- Lion (Best Actor in a Supporting Role, Best Actress in a Supporting Role, Best Original Music)
- Notes on Blindness (Outstanding Debut by a British Writer, Director or Producer, Outstanding British Film, Best Documentary)
- Amanda Knight (Best Makeup and Hair) – Rogue One: A Star Wars Story
- Andrea Arnold (Outstanding British Film) – American Honey
- Anya Taylor-Joy (EE Rising Star Award)
- David Hare (Outstanding British Film) – Denial
- David Heyman (Outstanding British Film) – Fantastic Beasts and Where to Find Them
- David Yates (Outstanding British Film) – Fantastic Beasts and Where to Find Them
- Glenn Freemantle (Best Sound) – Fantastic Beasts and Where to Find Them
- Ian Tapp (Best Sound) – Fantastic Beasts and Where to Find Them
- J. K. Rowling (Outstanding British Film) – Fantastic Beasts and Where to Find Them
- Joanna Johnston (Best Costume Design) – Allied
- Joe Walker (Best Editing) – Arrival
- Lionel Wigram (Outstanding British Film) – Fantastic Beasts and Where to Find Them
- Lisa Tomblin (Best Makeup and Hair) – Rogue One: A Star Wars Story
- Mica Levi (Best Original Music) – Jackie
- Mike Prestwood Smith (Best Sound) – Deepwater Horizon
- Neil Corbould (Best Special Visual Effects) – Rogue One: A Star Wars Story
- Paul Corbould (Best Special Visual Effects) – Doctor Strange
- Richard Bluff (Best Special Visual Effects) – Doctor Strange
- Samir Mehanović (Best Short Film) – Mouth of Hell
- Simon Hayes (Best Sound) – Fantastic Beasts and Where to Find Them
- Tim Burke (Best Special Visual Effects) – Fantastic Beasts and Where to Find Them

=== Golden Globe Awards ===
The 74th Golden Globe Awards honoring the best films of 2016 were held on January 8, 2017.

British winner:

- Aaron Taylor-Johnson (Best Supporting Actor in a Motion Picture) – Nocturnal Animals

British nominees:

- Florence Foster Jenkins (Best Motion Picture – Musical or Comedy, Best Actor in a Motion Picture – Musical or Comedy, Best Actress in a Motion Picture – Musical or Comedy, Best Supporting Actor in a Motion Picture)
- Lion (Best Motion Picture – Drama, Best Supporting Actor in a Motion Picture, Best Supporting Actress in a Motion Picture, Best Original Score)
- The Lobster (Best Actor in a Motion Picture – Musical or Comedy)
- Loving (Best Actor in a Motion Picture – Drama, Best Actress in a Motion Picture – Drama)
- Sing Street (Best Motion Picture – Musical or Comedy)
- Andrew Garfield (Best Actor in a Motion Picture – Drama) – Hacksaw Ridge
- Benjamin Wallfisch (Best Original Score) – Hidden Figures
- Daniel Pemberton (Best Original Song) – "Gold" for Gold
- Hugh Grant (Best Actor in a Motion Picture – Musical or Comedy) – Florence Foster Jenkins
- Lily Collins (Best Actress in a Motion Picture – Musical or Comedy) – Rules Don't Apply
- Naomie Harris (Best Supporting Actress in a Motion Picture) – Moonlight

== Notable deaths ==
Month	Date	Name	Age	Nationality	Profession	Notable films
January	9	Teresa Ann Savoy	61	British-born Italian	Actress	I'll Take Her Like a Father; Private Vices, Public Pleasures; Caligula
January	17	Philip Bond	82	English	Actor	I Want What I Want; Fever Pitch; Count Five and Die
January	20	John Watkiss	55	English	Animator	Tarzan; The Emperor's New Groove; Atlantis: The Lost Empire; Treasure Planet
January	23	Gorden Kaye	75	English	Actor	The Party's Over; Jabberwocky; Porridge; Brazil
January	25	Sir John Hurt	77	English	Actor	The Elephant Man; Nineteen Eighty-Four; Harry Potter film series; The Proposition; V for Vendetta; Indiana Jones and the Kingdom of the Crystal Skull
February	1	Desmond Carrington	90	English	Actor	Calamity the Cow
February	6	Roy Forge Smith	87	English	Set designer	Monty Python and the Holy Grail; Far From The Madding Crowd; Jabberwocky; Mrs. Soffel; Teenage Mutant Ninja Turtles
February	17	Michael Tuchner	82	English	Director	Villain; Mr. Quilp; The Likely Lads; Trenchcoat
February	25	Neil Fingleton	36	English	Actor	X-Men: First Class; 47 Ronin; Jupiter Ascending; Avengers: Age of Ultron
February	26	David Rose	92	English	Executive producer	The House of the Seven Hawks; Letter to Brezhnev; My Beautiful Laundrette; Mona Lisa
February	28	James Walker	76	English	Actor	Nineteen Eighty-Four; Empire of the Sun; Twelfth Night (1996)
March	9	Ann Beach	78	English	Actress	Under Milk Wood; Never Mind the Quality Feel the Width; King Ralph; Notting Hill
March	9	Jane Freeman	81	English-born Welsh	Actress	Scrubbers
March	10	Tony Haygarth	72	English	Actor	Unman, Wittering and Zigo; Britannia Hospital; A Private Function; The Dressmaker; The Trial; Chicken Run
March	10	John Forgeham	75	English	Actor	The Italian Job; The Young Americans; Kiss of the Dragon; Mean Machine
March	17	Robert Day	94	English	Director	Two Way Stretch; Tarzan the Magnificent; Operation Snatch; The Quick and the Dead
March	23	Nigel Hutchinson	75	English-born New Zealand	Producer	Goodbye Pork Pie; Home by Christmas
March	27	Richard Beale	96	English	Actor	The Battle of the River Plate; A Handful of Dust; Hedd Wyn
March	27	David Storey	83	English	Screenwriter and novelist	This Sporting Life
March	28	Ronald Hines	87	English	Actor	Dunkirk; Sink the Bismarck!; The Angry Silence; Whistle Down the Wind; The Informers
May	2	Moray Watson	76	Scottish-born American	Actress	Find the Lady; Every Home Should Have One; The Sea Wolves
May	5	Quinn O'Hara	88	English	Actor	A Swingin' Summer; The Ghost in the Invisible Bikini; Cry of the Banshee; Rubia's Jungle
May	10	Geoffrey Bayldon	93	English	Actor	Dracula; A Night to Remember; 55 Days at Peking; Casino Royale (1967); To Sir, with Love
May	21	Andrew Dallmeyer	73	Scottish	Actor	Morticia; Me and Kaminski; Whisky Galore!
May	23	Roger Moore	89	English	Actor	Live and let Die; The Man with the Golden Gun; Shout at the Devil; The Spy Who Loved Me; The Wild Geese; North Sea Hijack
May	30	Molly Peters	75	English	Actor	Thunderball; Target for Killing; The Naked World of Harrison Marks; Don't Raise the Bridge, Lower the River
June	2	Peter Sallis	96	English	Actor	The Curse of the Werewolf; My Lover, My Son; The Night Digger; The Incredible Sarah; Who Is Killing the Great Chefs of Europe?
June	4	Bill Butler	84	English	Editor	Buona Sera, Mrs. Campbell; A Clockwork Orange; A Touch of Class; How to Beat the High Co$t of Living; What Matters Most (2001)
June	12	Sam Beazley	101	British	Actor	Madame Sousatzka; Johnny English; Bridget Jones: The Edge of Reason; Harry Potter and the Order of the Phoenix
June	19	Brian Cant	83	English	Editor	The Pleasure Girls; The Sandwich Man; A Feast at Midnight
July	1	Heathcote Williams	75	English	Actor	Wish You Were Here; Orlando; Blue Juice; The Legend of 1900
July	3	Joe Robinson	90	English	Actor and stuntman	A Kid for Two Farthings; Sea Fury; Erik the Conqueror; The Loneliness of the Long Distance Runner; Diamonds Are Forever
July	9	Clare Douglas	73	English	Editor	The Misadventures of Margaret; Bloody Sunday; A Way of Life; United 93
July	15	William Hoyland	73	English	Actor	The Ragman's Daughter; For Your Eyes Only; Gandhi; Return of the Jedi; Hellboy; A Mighty Heart
July	16	Trevor Baxter	84	English	Actor	Nutcracker; Parting Shots; Sky Captain and the World of Tomorrow; Van Wilder: The Rise of Taj
July	21	Deborah Watling	69	English	Actress	That'll Be the Day, Take Me High, Where Time Began (English dubbed version)
July	25	Hywel Bennett	96	Welsh	Actor	The Virgin Soldiers; Percy; Alice's Adventures in Wonderland
August	3	Robert Hardy	91	English	Actor	The Spy Who Came in from the Cold; 10 Rillington Place; The Children; Harry Potter and the Chamber of Secrets; Mary Shelley's Frankenstein
August	16	Jennifer Daniel	81	Welsh	Actress	Edgar Wallace Mysteries; Kiss of the Vampire; The Reptile; Emily Brontë's Wuthering Heights
August	26	Alan Root	80	British	Director	The Year of the Wildebeest, Safari by Balloon, Mysterious Castles of Clay, Two in the Bush
August	30	Alan MacDonald	61	Welsh	Production designer	Kinky Boots, The Queen, The Edge of Love, The Best Exotic Marigold Hotel, Philomena
September	2	Larrington Walker	70	Jamaican-born British	Actor	Second Coming; Burning an Illusion; Lamb; Human Traffic
September	11	Peter Hall	86	English	Actress	Work Is a Four-Letter Word; The Homecoming; Akenfield
September	21	Suzan Farmer	75	English	Actress	633 Squadron; Hammer films
September	25	Tony Booth	85	English	Actor	The L-Shaped Room; The Girl with the Pistol; Confessions of a Window Cleaner; Adolf Hitler: My Part in His Downfall; Priest
September	28	Benjamin Whitrow	80	English	Actor	Quadrophenia; Restoration; Personal Services; Chicken Run; Darkest Hour
October	21	Rosemary Leach	81	English	Actress	That'll Be the Day; A Room with a View; The Children
November	21	Rodney Bewes	79	English	Actor	Billy Liar; Alice's Adventures in Wonderland; The Likely Lads; Jabberwocky
November	30	Terence Beesley	60	English	Actor	The Phantom of the Opera (1989); Human Traffic; Decadence; London Has Fallen
December	11	Keith Chegwin	60	English	Actor	Whatever Happened to Harold Smith?; Kill Keith

== See also ==
- Lists of British films
- 2017 in film
- 2017 in British music
- 2017 in British radio
- 2017 in British television
- 2017 in the United Kingdom
- List of 2017 box office number-one films in the United Kingdom
- List of British films of 2016
- List of British films of 2018
