= Pauper's funeral =

In the UK, funeral for a poor person paid for under the Poor law

In the United Kingdom, a pauper's funeral was a funeral for a pauper paid for under the Poor Law. This policy addressed the condition of the poor people of Britain, such as those living in the workhouses, where a growing population of the British ended their days from the 1850s to the 1860s. This period saw between 32 and 48 percent increase in the proportion of the elderly and the sick paupers in these institutions. An account described how poor people could not avail themselves of the funeral relief until they entered the workhouse.

The common law right of the dead to a dignified burial was first recognized in England in the 1840 case Rex v. Stewart, 12 AD. & E. 773.

== History ==
According to Lacquer, pauper's funerals were seen at the time as a sign of failure, being a source of worry for the poor and degrading to their survivors. He states that while the poor had been buried at the expense of the local parish since at least the 1500s, pauper's funerals first became stigmatized between about 1750 and 1850, as social standing began to depend on acquired attributes like wealth, membership in organizations, and philanthropic or entrepreneurial prominence. In the 1600s and early 1700s, there had been almost no relationship between the wealth of an ordinary person and the costs of their funerals, which were more focused on feasts than parades. The College of Arms had a monopoly on all funerals involving heraldry, with set arrangements for each place in the social order, until the late 1600s, after which more expensive funerals became more widely available. The costs of a funeral later began to closely match the social class and wealth of the deceased. In 1811 the essayist Charles Lamb wrote that "Nothing tended to keep up in the imaginations of the poorer sort of people, a generous horror of the workhouse more than the manner in which pauper funerals were conducted."

== Modern usage of the term ==
The phrase is still sometimes used, both in the UK and some Commonwealth countries, to describe a public health funeral (or equivalent service outside the UK): a basic burial paid for by the local authority when funeral arrangements cannot (or will not) be made by the family of the deceased. For instance, due to the inability of some families to pay for funeral costs the local authorities pay for the expenses of around 4,000 burials in the country every year.

== See also ==
- Potter's field
