= Battle of Ashar Creek =

1775 Naval battle

Battle of 'Ashar Creek
- Part of Ottoman–Persian War (1776–1779)
- The Route to Basra
Date	31 March 1775 – 15 April 1775
Location	al-Ashar, near Basra, present-day Iraq
Result	Zand victory

Belligerents
Ottoman Empire; East India Company	Zand Iran; Banu Ka'b; Bushehr

Commanders and leaders
Soleyman Aqa; Henry Moore	Shaykh Naser

Units involved
2 gallivants, Eagle and Success ships, 200 janissaries, various Ottoman vessels	14 gulf gallivants, 16 ships including 10 gallivants, Tyger ship, 50 smaller ships

The Battle of Ashar Creek was a prolonged naval engagement in Spring of 1775 between the Zand Dynasty of Iran, aided by the Banu Ka'b and Shaykh of Bushehr, against the Ottoman Mamluk-held Iraq and their British aides. A chain boom had been constructed over the Shatt al-Arab to inhibit a naval blockade of Basra. The Persians made many attempts both to probe and break through, and were held up for half a month until the British chain was broken and the Persians were subsequently able to extend their blockade over the entire city.

== Prelude ==
On 10 January 1775, Sadeq Khan Zand, the brother of Iranian dynast Karim Khan Zand, upon prior orders marched in the direction of Khuzestan and began a siege to seize the vital commercial port city of Basra. The Ottoman garrison under Soleyman Aqa was aided primarily by the al-Muntafiq and the British, whose lead agent, Henry Moore, was strictly anti-Iranian and already engaged in a conflict with the pro-Zand Banu Ka'b, and wished to prevent their reduction of the city. They began to collaborate with the Ottoman defenders in inhibiting Persian naval dominance over the Shatt al-Arab. The Banu Ka'b also provided support to the Zands with their own naval vessels. The Ottomans additionally possessed a large number of vessels, but they were lower in quality, and required English assistance.

== Battle ==
On 12 March, Sadeq was marching westward toward Basra and was mirrored by various boats for transporting supplies. Simultaneously, the British under Henry Moore chained various boats together near the Ashar Creek to prevent Iranian naval dominance, and attacked Iranian supply boats. They held 2 gallivats as well as the Eagle and Success ships. 200 janissaries from the garrison later arrived, which boosted the defenders' morale. The Muntafiq chiefs also promised to provide help.

On 31 March, a fighting fleet was provided to supplement Sadeq's army with the help of Shaykh Naser of Bushehr. This force consisted of 14 gulf gallivants and 50 smaller ships, and in the subsequent skirmishing, a couple of Naser's ships were burned. On 8 April, further fighting was seen between the Iranian fleet, which now included 16 ships total with 10 gallivants and the captured Tyger ship. However, the attempt to dislodge the British defenders ended in a failure and was driven back.

Shaykh Naser skirmished with the British on 11 April, returned to Bushehr, and then attacked them again on 15 April, where he finally scattered the British after a final cannonade and destroyed the chain boom. The British survived by slipping past the Zand fleet and retiring for Bushehr, then Bombay.

== Aftermath ==
Sadeq established picket lines surrounding Basra and began starving it at unprecedented rates. The same day, the Persians camped 3 miles upstream of the Ashar Creek. The Zands later formed their own chain boom as the siege intensified within Basra, but it was destroyed by a strong northern wind, which resulted in the abortive Omani intervention. Basra later fell on 20 April 1776. The fall, directly linked to the victory at Ashar permanently reduced Basra to a weakened state.

== See also ==
- Siege of Basra
- Sadeq Khan Zand
- Ottoman-Persian War
