= The Whalebone Box =

2019 film by Andrew Kötting

- Directed by: Andrew Kötting
- Written by: Andrew Kötting
- Produced by: Andrew Kötting
- Cinematography: Nick Gordon Smith
- Edited by: Andrew Kötting
- Release date: 2019 (FIDMarseille)
- Running time: 89 mins

The Whalebone Box is a 2019 documentary film directed by Andrew Kötting.

== Synopsis ==
According to Owen Richards at The Arts Desk, "Essentially, the plot follows Kötting, writer Iain Sinclair, and photographer Anonymous Bosch as they travel from London to Tarbert, off the west of Scotland, in possession of a box. It was crafted from the bones of a beached whale, and gifted to Sinclair by its sculptor Steve Dilworth. Their intention is to return it to the sands from which it came."

According to Mark Kermode in The Guardian, "part of The Whalebone Box is a typically fragmented account of that journey, venturing in a chronological fashion from the psychic aerial of Sway Tower in the New Forest to the standing stones of Lewis (via diversions through the Pyrenees), all recorded in a variety of DIY formats, both physical and digital, and interspersed with archive footage, still photography and animation. The other part is a journey into the dreams of Eden Kötting, the remarkable artist who has long been the muse and inspiration of her father, Andrew."

== Cast ==
- MacGillivray (Kirsten Norrie)
- Philip Hoare
- Eden Kotting
- Iain Sinclair

== Release ==
The Whalebone Box had its world premiere at FIDMarseille in Marseille, France in 2019.

== Reception ==
As of 7 March 2025, the film had a 100% rating on Rotten Tomatoes.
