= Edith Walks =

2017 documentary film

Edith Walks is a 2017 documentary film directed by Andrew Kötting which imagines a journey by Edith the Fair, wife of English king Harold Godwinson, from Waltham Abbey where he is buried to near the site of the Battle of Hastings and the invasion of England by William the Conqueror in 1066. It includes contributions from the writers Alan Moore and Iain Sinclair, the torch singer Claudia Barton, and the musician Jem Finer.

== Plot ==
The film covers the journey of Edith from Waltham Abbey directly as the crow flies to Battle, East Sussex, the approximate site of the Battle of Hastings, and to the statue of Edith and Harold at Grosvenor Gardens in St Leonards-on-Sea. This is not an actual journey by Edith but it is approximately the reverse of the journey of Harold's body from his death to its burial at the Abbey in Essex. The journey is re-enacted by a group of six people, who include Claudia Barton dressed as Edith, Kötting, Moore, Sinclair, and two musicians.

It also includes a discussion of the marital status of Edith, who was Harold's handfasted wife but is sometimes termed his mistress. Alan Moore theorises that Harold was in some sense reincarnated as Hereward the Wake who led the resistance to William in East Anglia.

== Production and release ==
The film is the third collaboration of Kötting and Iain Sinclair, following Swandown and By Our Selves, all three of which enact different journeys. It was shown in cinemas in 2017 alongside "Forgotten the Queen", a short about Edith directed by Eden Kötting, Andrew Kötting's daughter.

== Critical reaction ==
On review aggregator Rotten Tomatoes, the film has an approval rating of 100% based on 7 reviews, with an average rating of 7.30/10. The Observer gave it 4/5 praising its "eccentricity" and Kötting's "anarchic lawlessness". Peter Bradshaw in The Guardian rated it 3/5, noting its very low budget and lack of "conventional production values". He also mocks some of Alan Moore's wilder claims, such as when Moore says he can recognise an authentic battlefield by its feel. The Skinny called the journey "at once piss-takingly absurd and profoundly resonant". Sight and Sound chose it as their film of the week and remarked on the timeliness of its discussion of English identity at the time of Brexit and new debates over England's role in the world. The National noted its refusal to fit into any single genre and praised Barton's performance.
