= I, Daniel Blake =

2016 film by Ken Loach

- British release poster
- Directed by: Ken Loach
- Written by: Paul Laverty
- Produced by: Rebecca O'Brien
- Starring: Dave Johns; Hayley Squires
- Cinematography: Robbie Ryan
- Edited by: Jonathan Morris
- Music by: George Fenton
- Production companies: BBC Films; Wild Bunch; Sixteen Films; Why Not Productions
- Distributed by: British Film Institute; Entertainment One (United Kingdom); Le Pacte (France)
- Release dates: 13 May 2016 (Cannes); 21 October 2016 (United Kingdom)
- Running time: 100 minutes
- Country: United Kingdom
- Language: English
- Box office: $15.8 million

I, Daniel Blake is a 2016 British drama film written by Paul Laverty and directed by Ken Loach. The film stars Dave Johns as Daniel Blake, a middle-aged man who is denied Employment and Support Allowance despite being declared unfit to work by his doctor. Hayley Squires co-stars as Katie, a struggling single mother whom Daniel befriends.

I, Daniel Blake won the Palme d'Or at the 2016 Cannes Film Festival, the Prix du public at the 2016 Locarno International Film Festival, and the 2017 BAFTA Award for Outstanding British Film.

== Plot ==
Daniel Blake, a widowed 59-year-old joiner from Newcastle, has had a heart attack. Though his doctor has not allowed him to return to work, he is deemed fit to do so after a Work Capability Assessment and is denied Employment and Support Allowance. Daniel is frustrated to learn that his doctor was not contacted about this decision and thus applies for an appeal, a process Daniel finds difficult because he must complete forms online and is not computer literate.

Daniel befriends Katie Morgan, a single mother, after she is sanctioned for arriving late to her Jobcentre appointment. Katie and her children have just moved to Newcastle from a homeless shelter in London, as there is no affordable accommodation. Daniel helps the family by repairing objects, teaching them how to heat rooms without electricity, and crafting wooden toys for the children.

During a food bank visit, Katie breaks down crying, having become overwhelmed by hunger due to feeding her children instead of herself. After she is caught shoplifting at a supermarket, a security guard secretly offers Katie work as a prostitute. Daniel surprises her at the brothel where she goes to work and begs her to give up the job, but Katie tearfully insists she has no other way to feed her children.

As a condition for receiving Jobseeker's Allowance, Daniel must keep looking for work. He refuses a job at a garden centre because his doctor will not allow him to work yet. When his work coach tells him he must work harder to find a job or be sanctioned, Daniel spray paints "I, Daniel Blake, demand my appeal date before I starve" on the side of the building. Daniel earns the support of bystanders, including other people claiming benefits, but is arrested and cautioned by the police.

Daniel sells most of his belongings and becomes a recluse but is pulled out of his depression by Katie's daughter, Daisy, who brings him a homemade meal to repay Daniel for his kindness. On the day of Daniel's appeal, Katie accompanies him to the tribunal, where a welfare adviser tells Daniel that his case looks promising. Upon seeing the judge and doctor who will decide his fate, Daniel becomes anxious and excuses himself to use the toilet, where he suffers another heart attack and dies.

Later, Katie reads a eulogy at his public health funeral, including a speech he had intended to read at his appeal. The speech describes his feelings about how the welfare system failed him, and states, "I am not a blip on a computer screen or a national insurance number, I am a man."

== Cast ==
- Dave Johns as Daniel Blake
- Hayley Squires as Katie Morgan
- Briana Shann as Daisy Morgan
- Dylan McKiernan as Dylan Morgan
- Kate Rutter as Ann
- Sharon Percy as Sheila
- Kema Sikazwe as China
- Steven Richens as Piper
- Gavin Webster as Joe
- Mick Laffey as Welfare Benefits Advisor
- Laura Jane Barnes-Martin-Foster as Welfare Rights Officer

== Production ==
Principal photography began in October 2015 in Newcastle upon Tyne and the surrounding area. The film was produced by Rebecca O'Brien for Sixteen Films, Why Not Productions and Wild Bunch with the support of the British Film Institute and BBC Films.

O'Brien initially approached Channel 4's film division for funding. After a delay, O'Brien said she was told by Channel 4 that funding was not available as "we're already covering the area because we're doing Benefits Street", a programme that many saw as demonising people on state welfare.

== Marketing ==
I, Daniel Blake used a variety of marketing strategies to make sure Ken Loach's points got across to his targeted audience and that the film reached a wider audience, including disruptive marketing, street displays and newspaper inclusions. Ken Loach worked with the Trinity Mirror through the use of the editorial column of The Mirror and each newspaper had the "I" changed to reflect the main font of the film.

The Trinity Mirror also provided 10,000 free tickets to see the movie as announced in one of their newspapers and used Daniel Blake as the masthead for its papers. The House of Commons and other major buildings in London had projections of Daniel Blake's end speech placed onto the outside walls as part of its "Guerrilla Marketing Campaign".

Ken Loach retweeted various tweets promoting the film and even started a hashtag #WeAreAllDanielBlake which can mostly be found on the official I, Daniel Blake Twitter page.

== Reception ==
I, Daniel Blake is Loach's biggest success at the UK box office. On the review aggregator website Rotten Tomatoes, the film has an approval rating of 92%, based on 184 reviews, with an average rating of 8.01/10. The site's consensus reads: "I, Daniel Blake marks yet another well-told chapter in director Ken Loach's powerfully populist filmography." On Metacritic, the film has a score of 78 out of 100, based on 31 critics, indicating "generally favourable reviews".

Writing in the Observer, Mark Kermode gave the film five stars.

=== Legacy ===
In 2017, Dave Johns took a solo show to the Edinburgh Fringe: I, Filum Star chronicled how Johns's life had changed since the success of the film, and received critical acclaim, playing to sold out rooms throughout the run. In 2019, he toured a new show, From Byker to the BAFTAs, with 24 dates from August until November that year.

A stand-up comedy show titled I, Tom Mayhew was performed at the Edinburgh Fringe in August 2019. The stand-up comedian Tom Mayhew had previously been on benefits for over three years in "austerity Britain" and was inspired to write the show after watching the film. The show was critically acclaimed, with it transferring to a sold-out run at the Soho Theatre in January 2020.

Dave Johns wrote a stage version updated to the 2021/2022 cost of living crisis, which was set to be premiered at the Northern Stage, Newcastle upon Tyne in May 2023. Following this sold-out run, it is touring throughout the rest of the year.

=== Political response ===
The Conservative Party's then-Secretary of State for Work and Pensions, Iain Duncan Smith, said the film was unfair and criticised its portrayal of Jobcentre staff: "This idea that everybody is out to crunch you, I think it has really hurt Jobcentre staff who don't see themselves as that." The producer, Rebecca O'Brien, responded that Duncan Smith "is living in cloud cuckoo land".

On the 27 October 2016 episode of the BBC topical debate programme Question Time, which had Loach as a panellist, the Conservative Party's then-Business Secretary Greg Clark described the film as "fictional" and said, "It's a difficult job administering a benefits system. Department for Work and Pensions staff have to make incredibly difficult decisions and I think they should have our support in making those decisions."

Loach responded by criticising the pressure that DWP staff are placed under: "We talked to hundreds of people who work at the DWP under your guidance and instructions, and they are told to sanction people. If they don't sanction them, they're in trouble." He later said, "When you're sanctioned your life is forced into chaos, and people are going to food banks. How can we live in a society where hunger is used as a weapon?"

The Labour Party's then-Leader, Jeremy Corbyn, appeared at the film's London premiere and praised the film on his Facebook page. During Prime Minister's Questions on 2 November 2016, Corbyn criticised the unfairness of the welfare system and advised then-Prime Minister Theresa May to watch the film.

=== Accolades ===
List of awards and nominations
Award	Date of ceremony	Category	Recipient(s)	Result	Ref(s)
Australian Film Critics Association	7 March 2017	Best International Film (English Language)	I, Daniel Blake	Nominated	
British Academy Film Awards	12 February 2017	Best Film	Rebecca O'Brien	Nominated	
British Academy Film Awards	12 February 2017	Best Actress in a Supporting Role	Hayley Squires	Nominated	
British Academy Film Awards	12 February 2017	Best Direction	Ken Loach	Nominated	
British Academy Film Awards	12 February 2017	Best Original Screenplay	Paul Laverty	Nominated	
British Academy Film Awards	12 February 2017	Best British Film	Paul Laverty, Ken Loach and Rebecca O'Brien	Won	
British Independent Film Awards	4 December 2016	Best British Independent Film	I, Daniel Blake	Nominated	
British Independent Film Awards	4 December 2016	Best Director	Ken Loach	Nominated	
British Independent Film Awards	4 December 2016	Best Actor	Dave Johns	Won	
British Independent Film Awards	4 December 2016	Best Actress	Hayley Squires	Nominated	
British Independent Film Awards	4 December 2016	Most Promising Newcomer	Dave Johns	Nominated	
British Independent Film Awards	4 December 2016	Most Promising Newcomer	Hayley Squires	Won	
British Independent Film Awards	4 December 2016	Best Screenplay	Paul Laverty	Nominated	
Cannes Film Festival	22 May 2016	Palme d'Or	Ken Loach	Won	
Cannes Film Festival	22 May 2016	Palm DogManitarian Award	Ken Loach (showcasing a three-legged dog named Shea)	Won	
César Awards	24 February 2017	Best Foreign Film	Ken Loach	Won	
Denver Film Festival	14 November 2016	Special Jury Prize: Best Actress	Hayley Squires	Won	
Empire Awards	19 March 2017	Best British Film	I, Daniel Blake	Won	
Empire Awards	19 March 2017	Best Director	Ken Loach	Nominated	
Empire Awards	19 March 2017	Best Male Newcomer	Dave Johns	Won	
Empire Awards	19 March 2017	Best Female Newcomer	Hayley Squires	Nominated	
European Film Awards	10 December 2016	Best Film	I, Daniel Blake	Nominated	
European Film Awards	10 December 2016	Best Director	Ken Loach	Nominated	
European Film Awards	10 December 2016	Best Actor	Dave Johns	Nominated	
European Film Awards	10 December 2016	Best Screenwriter	Paul Laverty	Nominated	
Evening Standard British Film Awards	8 December 2016	Best Film	I, Daniel Blake	Won	
Evening Standard British Film Awards	8 December 2016	Best Actor	Dave Johns	Nominated	
Evening Standard British Film Awards	8 December 2016	Best Supporting Actress	Hayley Squires	Won	
Evening Standard British Film Awards	8 December 2016	Best Screenplay	Paul Laverty	Nominated	
Evening Standard British Film Awards	8 December 2016	Most Powerful Scene Award	I, Daniel Blake	Won	
Golden Tomato Awards	12 January 2017	Best British Movie 2016	I, Daniel Blake	3rd Place	
Locarno International Film Festival	13 August 2016	Prix du public	Ken Loach	Won	
London Film Critics' Circle	22 January 2017	Film of the Year	I, Daniel Blake	Nominated	
London Film Critics' Circle	22 January 2017	British/Irish Film of the Year	I, Daniel Blake	Won	
London Film Critics' Circle	22 January 2017	British/Irish Actor of the Year	Dave Johns	Nominated	
London Film Critics' Circle	22 January 2017	British/Irish Actress of the Year	Hayley Squires	Nominated	
Magritte Awards	3 February 2018	Best Foreign Film in Coproduction	I, Daniel Blake	Nominated	
New York Film Critics Online	11 December 2016	Top 12 Films	I, Daniel Blake	Won	
San Sebastián International Film Festival	24 September 2016	Audience Award: Best Film	Ken Loach	Won	
Stockholm International Film Festival	20 November 2016	Audience Award: Best Film	Ken Loach	Won	
Vancouver International Film Festival	14 October 2016	Most Popular International Feature	Ken Loach	Won	
