= Swandown =

- Directed by: Andrew Kötting
- Written by: Andrew Kötting; Iain Sinclair
- Produced by: Lisa Marie Russo
- Starring: Andrew Kötting; Iain Sinclair
- Release date: 20 July 2012
- Country: United Kingdom
- Language: English

Swandown is a 2012 film directed by Andrew Kötting.

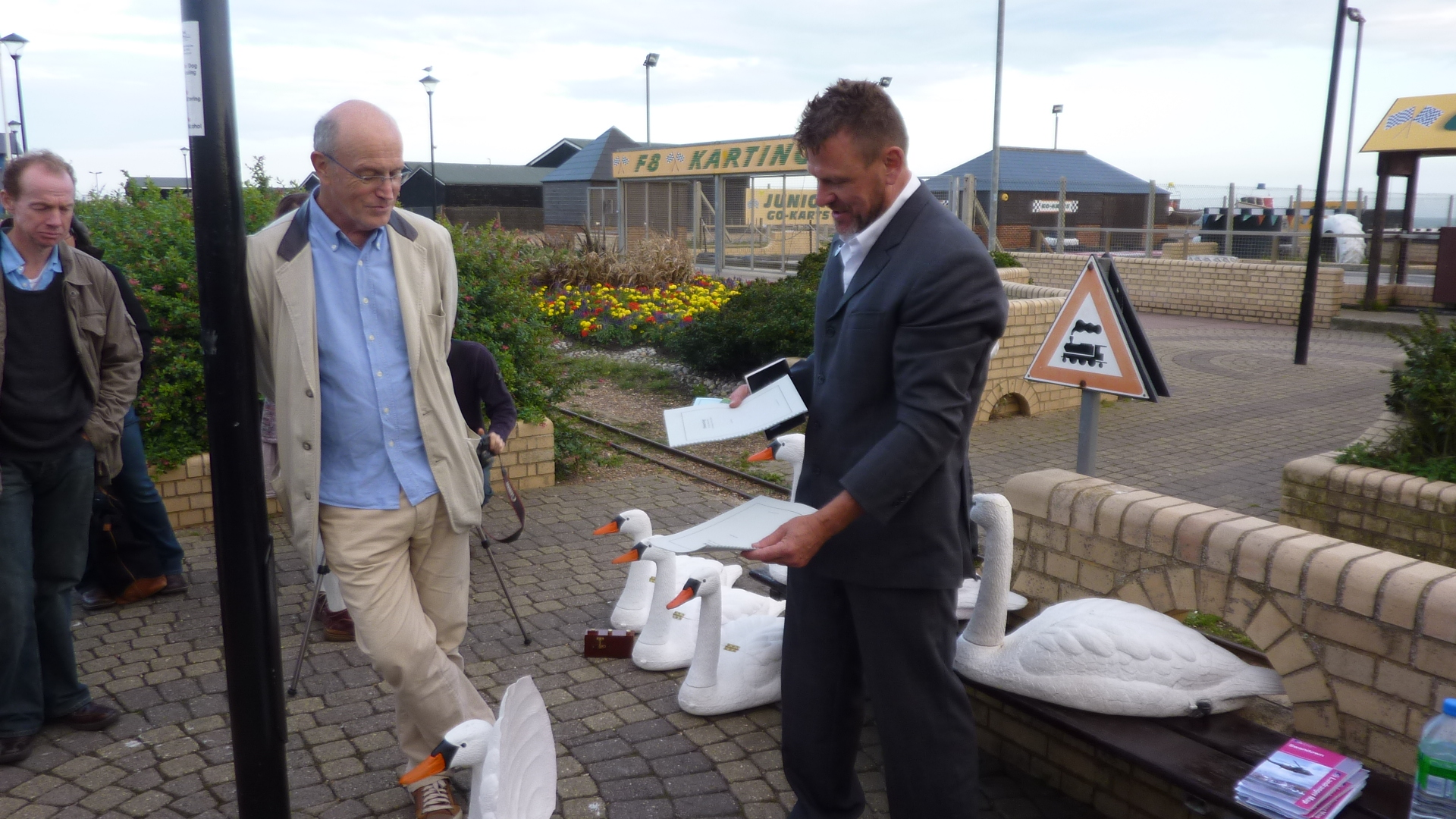
Sinclair and Kötting giving a talk about the project, in 2010

To make the film, Andrew Kötting and Iain Sinclair pedaled a swan pedalo from the seaside in Hastings to Hackney in East London, occasionally joined by guests including Alan Moore, Stewart Lee, Dudley Sutton, Dr Mark Lythgoe and Marcia Farquhar.
