= Samir Mehanović =

Bosnian film director

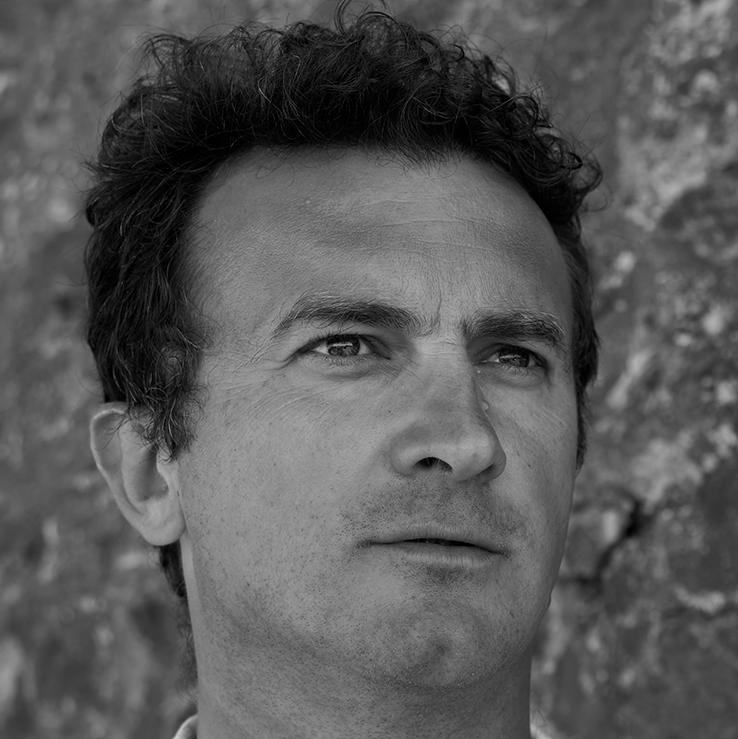
- Mehanović on location in Jharia, India
- Born: Tuzla, Bosnia
- Occupation: Film director
- Years active: 1992–present
- Website: paradisofilmsproductions.com

Samir Mehanović is a Bosnian and British film director, producer, and screenwriter, known for his documentaries and narrative films exploring themes of war, identity, migration, and human rights. He is a BAFTA and IDFA award winner whose work often focuses on social justice and the experience of refugees. Originally from Bosnia and Herzegovina, Mehanović came to the United Kingdom as an immigrant from the Bosnian War and has lived in the United Kingdom since 1995. In September 2025 Mehanović was awarded the British Muslim Heritage Centre Award for Excellence in Art in recognition of his contribution to British cinema and the arts.

== Early life ==
Mehanović was the youngest of five sons in a family of coal miners. His father survived a mine explosion but was unable to continue mine work. He found employment as an usher and janitor at Moša Pijade, the Bosnian Cultural Centre in Tuzla, moving his family there. Young Mehanović often visited Moša Pijade and was inspired by the work of theatre companies from Eastern Europe and Russia.

During the Bosnian War, the siege of Tuzla by Serb forces put an end to Mehanović's studies. He established JLS Avantgarde Theatre company, developing as a director, learning together with his actors and creating plays. On 25 May 1995, Mehanović had just arrived at the theatre for rehearsals when the Tuzla massacre occurred. He was saved, but 71 young people were killed. Two months later, in July, Mehanović witnessed the arrival of refugees, mostly women and children, from the Srebrenica genocide.

Mehanović left Tuzla with his theatre company to perform at the Edinburgh Festival Fringe, invited by Richard Demarco, co-founder of the Traverse Theatre. Mehanović remained in Edinburgh and applied for asylum, briefly living on the streets before finding a council flat in Niddrie, a suburb of Edinburgh, at the time one of the most deprived areas in Scotland.

== Career ==
Mehanović continued directing theatre in Edinburgh and in 2001 directed his first short film, Pigs Flying Pink. In 2004 he completed an MA in film and TV at the Edinburgh College of Art, winning the Ingles Allen Award (2004) for Best MA Film with Game Over. The following year, he wrote and directed a short film, The Way We Played, about two boys from different religious backgrounds at the beginning of the Bosnian war. He won the Best First Time Director BAFTA Scotland award (2005) for this, and the Houston Film Festival Silver Award (2006).

Mehanović directed Class Enemy: A Message from Sarajevo, a 30-minute documentary, for BBC Artworks in 2008. The same year he directed Richard and I, about his relationship with art impresario Richard Demarco.

In 2014, he directed the short film Mouth of Hell (2015), filmed on location in Jharia, India. In 2016 Mouth of Hell was awarded Grand Prix Award at Drama ISFF, Greece. Mouth of Hell was nominated for BAFTA in 2017

In 2015, commissioned by the BBC, Mehanović made a film about the Srebrenica genocide The Fog of Srebrenica. This won the IDFA Special Jury Award as well as the Amnesty International Award at Ljubljana Doc Fest and also Best Cinematography Award at SEE Fest in LA.

During 2014-2018 Mehanovic filmed, directed and produced Through Our eyes, a film about Syrian refugees, which premiered in April 2018 at the Bertha Dochouse at Curzon Bloomsbury London.

In 2018/19 he produced and directed the documentary Spank the Banker.

In 2025 Mehanović's film Hijabi, which had a preview screening at Westminster, was broadcast on Al Jazeera English as My Hijab, My Choice. In September 2025 Mehanović was awarded the British Muslim Heritage Centre Award for Excellence in Art in recognition of his contribution to British cinema and the arts.

== Stage ==
Year	Title	Role
1992	The Prophet	Director
1993/94	Fly out of the cage	Director
1994	Dream of the Little Prince	Director
1995	Pictor and Pictoria	Director
1995	Lora's Bosnian Diary	Director
1997	Vivus Figurae	Director
1998	Carmina Burana	Director
2000	Performance on the Music by J.S. Bach	Director
2000	The Double	Director
2001	Perpetual Motion I	Director
2002	Perpetual Motion II	Director

== Film ==
Year	Title	Role	Type
2001	Pigs Flying Pink	Director	Short film
2004	Game Over	Director	Short film
2005	The Way We Played	Director, writer	Short film
2008	Richard and I	Director, producer, camera	Documentary
2009	Class Enemy: A Message from Sarajevo	Director	BBC Documentary
2014	Mouth of Hell	Director, writer	Short film
2015	The Fog of Srebrenica	Director, producer, camera	BBC World documentary
2018	Through Our Eyes	Director, producer, camera	documentary
2019	Spank the Banker	Director, producer, camera	documentary
2021	Banksters	Director, producer, camera	TV special RT
2024	Hijabi	Director, producer, camera	documentary
2025	My Hijab, My Choice	Director, producer, camera	Al Jazeera documentary
