= Gallivant =

- Directed by: Andrew Kötting
- Release date: 1996
- Country: United Kingdom

Gallivant is the first feature-length movie by Andrew Kötting. Released in 1996, it was a "highly idiosyncratic" documentary. It recorded a journey the director took clockwise around the coast of Britain accompanied by his 85-year-old grandmother, Gladys, and his seven-year-old daughter Eden. Eden was born at Guy's Hospital, London, in 1988 with a rare genetic disorder, Joubert syndrome, causing cerebral vermis hypoplasia and several other neurological complications. The growing closeness between these two and the sense of impending mortality give the film its emotional underpinning.

== Reception ==
Gallivant premiered at the Edinburgh Film Festival, where it won the Channel 4 Best New Director prize. It was ranked number 49 in Time Out's list of the 100 best British films. Stewart Lee, reacting against the one-star review Peter Bradshaw gave it in The Guardian, considers it ‘one of the 10 greatest films ever made’.
