= Andrew Kötting =

British artist, writer, and filmmaker (born 1959)

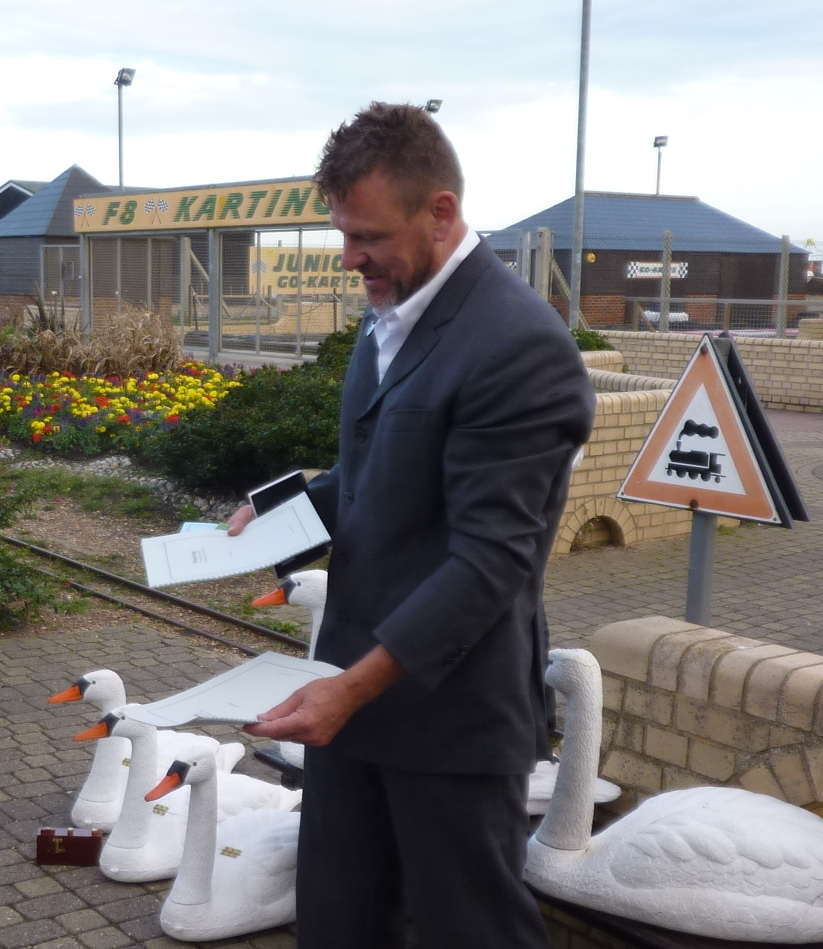
Kötting at an event for his Swandown film, in 2011

Andrew Kötting (born 16 December 1959) is a British artist, writer, and filmmaker.

He made numerous experimental short films, which were awarded prizes at international film festivals. Gallivant was his first feature film, a road/home film about his four-month journey around the coast of the UK, with his grandmother Gladys and his daughter Eden. Gallivant won the Channel 4 Prize at the Edinburgh Film Festival for Best Director and the Golden Ribbon Award in Rimini (Italy). In 2011 the film was voted number 49 in Best British Film of all time by Time Out.

Kötting has frequently collaborated with Iain Sinclair, Jem Finer and his daughter Eden Kötting. He is currently a Professor of Time Based Media at the University for the Creative Arts Canterbury.

== Early life ==
Kötting was born in Kent on 16 December 1959. He studied BA Fine Art at the Ravensbourne College of Art and Design in 1984 and MA in Mixed Media at the Slade School of Art in 1988.

== Life and career ==
Kötting released Gallivant, his first feature-length film, in 1996. It premièred at the Edinburgh Film Festival, where it won the Channel 4 Best New Director prize. Kötting released his second feature, This Filthy Earth, in 2001. It was loosely adapted from Émile Zola's novel La Terre.

In July 2010, Kötting was an artist-in-residence at the La Rochelle International Film Festival in south-west France, creating work and collaborating with the photographer Sebastian Edge. In 2011 he directed This Our Still Life, which premièred at the Venice Film Festival and was acquired by the BFI for distribution in the UK and Ireland.

Gareth Evans, Curator, Whitechapel Gallery, called Kötting one of Britain's most intriguing artists, currently practising who:

could be said to have taken to heart the spirit of visionary curiosity and hybrid creativity exemplified by the late Derek Jarman. His forty year oeuvre to date has moved from early live-art inflected, often absurdist pieces, through darkly comic shorts teasing out the melancholy surrealism at the heart of contemporary Englishness to nine resolutely independent feature films that take landscape and journeys as the springboards for visually striking and structurally inventive enquiries into identity, belonging, history and notions of community. It is his openness and outlaw intelligence and compelling wit that marks out his work as both vital and important."

== Filmography ==
- Klipperty Klopp (1984)
- Gallivant (1996)
- This Filthy Earth (2001)
- Mapping Perception (2002)
- In the Wake of Deadad (2006)
- Ivul (2009)
- Louyre: This Our Still Life (2011)
- Swandown (2012)
- By Our Selves (2015)
- Lek and the Dogs (2017)
- Edith Walks (2017)
- Their rancid Words Stagnate Our Ponds (2018)https://mubi.com/en/cast/andrew-kotting/films/director
- The Whalebone Box (2019)
- Diseased and Disorderly (2021) – short film with Eden Kotting, Glenn Whiting and Isabelle Skinner
- Nowness Experiments: Diseased and Disorderly
- The Buzz of the Past - short film (2022)
- The Tell Tale Rooms - VR Experience (2023)
- Hope Holds Up Her Head and Hopes (2025) - short film
- The Memory Blocks (2025)
- The Everyworld (2026)

== Performances ==
- 2013 Swandown, with Iain Sinclair, Jem Finer, Kirsten Norrie at Shoreline Literature Festival Aldeburgh, Dilston Grove London
- 2015 By Our Selves, with Sinclair, Norrie, Finer and David Aylward at Dilston Grove, Battersea Arts Centre, Whitechapel Gallery, Colchester Arts Centre, Whitechapel Gallery and Oxford Brookes University.
- 2016 Edith, with Claudia Barton at Electric Spring Huddersfield University.
- 2016 Edith, with Sinclair, Finer, Aylward, and Barton at Root 1066 Arts Festival, Hastings.
- 2017 Edith, with Barton at Alchemy Festival Hawick, Scottish Borders.
- 2017 Edith, with Sinclair, Finer, Aylward, Barton, Towner Gallery, Eastbourne.
- 2025 Hastings father-daughter duo host groundbreaking VR experience

== Publications ==
=== Publications by Kötting ===
- Swandown. With Iain Sinclair. Badbloodandsibyl, 2013. ISBN 978-0-9568733-30.
- By Our Selves. With Iain Sinclair, Dr Simon Kovesi, Toby Jones and Alan Moore. Badbloodandsibyl, 2015. ISBN 978-0-9568733-61.
- Edith (The Cronicles). With Iain Sinclair and Alan Moore. Badbloodandsibyl, 2016. ISBN 978-0-9568733-4-7
- Earthworks. Badbloodandsibyl, 2018. ISBN 978-0-9568733-7-8.
- The Tell Tale Rooms. Badbloodandsibyl, 2024. ISBN 978-1-7384684-0-9.
- Blabbermind. Badbloodandibyl, 2025. ISBN 978-1-7384684-1-6.
- Quantum Shenanigans & Gravitational To-Dos Downyönder in a Place of Energy & Wonder just before the precarious thereafter. Badbloodandsibyl, 2021. ISBN 978-0-9568733-8-5.

=== Publications with contributions by Kötting ===
- The Unwanted Sound of Everything we Think we Want. Kötting contributes a chapter in Documentary Film and the Listening Experience. University of Huddersfield Press, 2018. ISBN 978-1-86218-156-4.
