= Public health funeral =

In the UK, a funeral arranged by local authority

Public health funerals are funerals in the United Kingdom paid for by the local authority, where the relatives are either unwilling or unable to pay, or where no relatives can be found.

== England and Wales ==
Public health funerals in England and Wales are governed by the Public Health (Control of Disease) Act 1984. Local authorities are obliged to arrange a funeral where no arrangements are being made or have been made. Local authorities are permitted to recover the costs of such funerals from the estate of the deceased under the Act.

The Guardian reported that the average cost of a public health funeral in 2011 was £950. In some circumstances where a person dies in hospital the relevant NHS trust may arrange a funeral for the deceased; however, ultimately the duty to arrange the funeral rests with the local authority.

== Northern Ireland ==
Similar provisions to those in England and Wales exist in Northern Ireland under the Welfare Services Act (Northern Ireland) 1971. District councils are obligated to bury or cremate those who die in their area where no suitable provisions for disposal of the body have been made or are being made.

== Scotland ==
In Scotland, a duty is imposed on local authorities under the National Assistance Act 1948 (11 & 12 Geo. 6. c. 29) where the body of a person who has died or been found dead in their area and no suitable arrangements are being made for disposal of the body. A local authority may also arrange a burial or cremation for any person who was in the care of or receiving assistance (as well as children in local authority care) from the authority immediately prior to their death. In both cases, a local authority may seek to recover costs from the estate of the deceased.

549 funerals were undertaken in 2015 under the provisions above, costing local authorities approximately £500,000. These funerals are usually conducted by an undertaker contracted by the local authority to prepare the body and provide a basic funeral.
